= List of townships in South Dakota =

South Dakota townships
- Map of the 914 townships in South Dakota
- Category: Lower-level administrative division
- Location: South Dakota
- Created: 1873
- Number: 914
- Populations: 0 (Prospect Township) – 4,683 (Big Sioux Township)
- Areas: 0.4 square miles (1.0 km^{2}) (Vale Township) – 64.8 square miles (168 km^{2}) (Englewood Township)
- Government: Township government

This is a list of civil townships in South Dakota and their counties, based on U.S. Geological Survey and U.S. Census data.

== List ==
Township	County
Aberdeen	Brown
Ada	Perkins
Adams	Grant
Adams	Miner
Adrian	Edmunds
Afton	Brookings
Afton	Sanborn
Agency	Roberts
Alban	Grant
Alcester	Union
Alden	Hand
Allen	Beadle
Alliance	Moody
Allison	Brown
Alpena	Jerauld
Alpha	Hand
Altamont	Deuel
Alto	Roberts
Alton	Brookings
Altoona	Beadle
America	Brule
Anderson	Perkins
Andover	Day
Anina	Jerauld
Antelope	Perkins
Antelope	Spink
Antelope Valley	Deuel
Arcade	Faulk
Argentine	Fall River
Argo	Brookings
Ash	Clark
Ash	Pennington
Athol	Spink
Aurora	Aurora
Aurora	Brookings
Bad Nation	Mellette
Badger	Davison
Badger	Kingsbury
Badus	Lake
Bailey	Lyman
Baker	Davison
Baker	Kingsbury
Bangor	Brookings
Banner	Beadle
Banner	Tripp
Barrett	Beadle
Barrett	Perkins
Bates	Brown
Bates	Hand
Bath	Brown
Beaver Creek	Tripp
Beaver	Miner
Becker	Roberts
Beck-Highland	Perkins
Belford	Aurora
Belle Plaine	Spink
Belle Prairie	Beadle
Belle	Edmunds
Belleview	Miner
Belmont	Douglas
Belmont	Spink
Benedict	Sanborn
Benton	McCook
Benton	Minnehaha
Benton	Spink
Beotia	Spink
Bethel	Clay
Beulah	Davison
Beulah	Hanson
Big Sioux	Union
Big Springs	Union
Big Stone	Grant
Bison	Perkins
Black	Tripp
Blackpipe	Mellette
Blaine	Clark
Blaine	Jerauld
Blendon	Davison
Blinsmon	Moody
Blom	Deuel
Blooming Valley	Grant
Bonilla	Beadle
Bossko	Roberts
Bowdle	Edmunds
Brainard	Brown
Brandon	Minnehaha
Brandt	Deuel
Brantford	Hamlin
Bridgewater	McCook
Bristol	Aurora
Bristol	Day
Broadland	Beadle
Brookfield	McCook
Brookings	Brookings
Brooklyn	Lincoln
Brothersfield	Turner
Brule	Brule
Brule	Union
Brunson	Tripp
Bryan	Charles Mix
Bryant	Edmunds
Bryant	Faulk
Bryant	Roberts
Buffalo	Jones
Buffalo	Marshall
Buffalo	Minnehaha
Buffalo	Spink
Bull Creek	Tripp
Burdette	Hand
Burdick	Perkins
Burk	Minnehaha
Burke	Gregory
Burr Oak	Beadle
Butler	Day
Butler	Sanborn
Butte	Mellette
Cambria	Brown
Campbell	Hand
Canistota	McCook
Canova	Miner
Canton	Lincoln
Capital	Hutchinson
Capitola	Spink
Carl	McPherson
Carlisle	Brown
Carlton	Hand
Carlyle	Beadle
Carroll	Charles Mix
Carter	Tripp
Carthage	Miner
Cash	Perkins
Castalia	Charles Mix
Castle Butte	Pennington
Castle Butte	Perkins
Castlewood	Hamlin
Cavour	Beadle
Cedar Butte	Pennington
Cedar	Hand
Center	Aurora
Centerville	Faulk
Centerville	Turner
Central Point	Day
Chamberlain	Brule
Chance	Perkins
Chaudoin	Perkins
Chery	Jerauld
Chester	Douglas
Chester	Lake
Childstown	Turner
Choteau Creek	Charles Mix
Civil Bend	Union
Clare	Moody
Claremont	Brown
Clark	Douglas
Clark	Faulk
Clark	Perkins
Clarno	Lake
Clayton	Hutchinson
Clear Lake	Deuel
Clear Lake	Edmunds
Clear Lake	Minnehaha
Clearwater	Miner
Cleveland	Brule
Cleveland	Edmunds
Cleveland	Hamlin
Clifton	Beadle
Clifton	Spink
Clinton	Miner
Cloyd Valley	Edmunds
Clyde	Beadle
Cody	Mellette
Collins	Clark
Colman	Moody
Colome	Tripp
Columbia	Brown
Como	Hand
Conata	Pennington
Concord	Lake
Conde	Spink
Condon	Tripp
Cooper	Aurora
Cornwall	Spink
Cortlandt	Edmunds
Cottonwood Lake	Edmunds
Cottonwood	Clark
Crandon	Spink
Crooked Creek	Pennington
Cross Plains	Hutchinson
Crow Lake	Jerauld
Crow	Jerauld
Crystal Lake	Aurora
Curlew	Tripp
Custer	Beadle
Custer	Corson
Dakota	Meade
Daneville	Turner
Darlington	Charles Mix
Darlington	Clark
Day	Clark
Dayton	Lincoln
Dayton	Marshall
De Smet	Kingsbury
De Witt	Perkins
Dearborn	Beadle
Delapre	Lincoln
Delaware	Lincoln
Dell Rapids	Minnehaha
Dempster	Hamlin
Denver	Kingsbury
Devoe	Faulk
Dexter	Codington
Diana	Sanborn
Dickens	Gregory
Dixon	Gregory
Dixon	Hamlin
Dog Ear	Tripp
Dolton	Turner
Draper	Jones
Dry Wood Lake	Roberts
Dudley	Aurora
Duell	Perkins
Dumarce	Marshall
Dunkel	Jones
Eagle	Brule
Eagle	Meade
East Choteau	Douglas
East Hanson	Brown
East Rondell	Brown
Easter	Roberts
Eden	Clark
Eden	Codington
Eden	Lincoln
Eden	Marshall
Edens	Gregory
Edgerton	Hanson
Edison	Minnehaha
Egan	Moody
Egeland	Day
Elk Point	Union
Elkton	Brookings
Elliott	Sanborn
Elliston	Tripp
Ellisville	Faulk
Elm Springs	Meade
Elmira	Codington
Elrod	Clark
Elvira	Buffalo
Emerson	Faulk
Emery	McCook
Emmet	Union
Englewood	Perkins
Enterprise	Faulk
Enterprise	Moody
Enterprise	Roberts
Esmond	Kingsbury
Estelline	Hamlin
Eureka	Aurora
Eureka	Brookings
Exline	Spink
Fair	Hutchinson
Fairfax	Gregory
Fairview	Clay
Fairview	Faulk
Fairview	Hanson
Fairview	Lincoln
Fairview	Mellette
Fairview	Pennington
Farmington	Day
Farmington	Grant
Farmington	Lake
Firesteel	Aurora
Flandreau	Moody
Flat Butte	Pennington
Flat Creek	Perkins
Florence	Hamlin
Florence	Hand
Floyd	Sanborn
Forbes	Charles Mix
Fordham	Clark
Fort	Marshall
Foster	Beadle
Foster	Hutchinson
Foster	Perkins
Fountain	Edmunds
Foxton	Clark
Frankfort	Spink
Franklin	Jerauld
Franklin	Lake
Franklyn	Brown
Frederick	Brown
Fredlund	Perkins
Freedom	Faulk
Fremont	Moody
Fuller	Codington
Gales	Aurora
Garden Prairie	Brown
Garfield	Clark
Garfield	Clay
Garfield	Douglas
Garfield	Hamlin
Garfield	Roberts
Garfield	Spink
Garland	Brown
Gayville	Yankton
Gem	Brown
Geneseo	Roberts
Georgia	Grant
German	Hutchinson
Germantown	Codington
Germantown	Turner
Gilbert	Hand
Glen	Edmunds
Glendale	Hand
Glendo	Perkins
Glenwood	Clay
Glenwood	Deuel
Glover	Edmunds
Goodwill	Roberts
Goodwin	Deuel
Goose Lake	Charles Mix
Graceland	Codington
Grafton	Miner
Grand Meadow	Minnehaha
Grand River	Perkins
Grand	Hand
Grandview II	Jackson
Grandview	Douglas
Grandview	Hutchinson
Grange	Deuel
Grant Center	Grant
Grant	Beadle
Grant	Lincoln
Grant	McCook
Grant	Roberts
Great Bend	Spink
Green Valley	Miner
Greenfield	Brown
Greenland	McCook
Greenleaf	Hand
Greenwood	Tripp
Grenville	Day
Groton	Brown
Groveland	Spink
Grovena	Moody
Hague	Clark
Hall	Perkins
Hamilton	Charles Mix
Hamilton	Marshall
Hamlin	Hamlin
Hanson	Hanson
Harmon	Roberts
Harmony	Edmunds
Harmony	Jerauld
Harmony	Spink
Harrison	Spink
Hart	Roberts
Hartford	Minnehaha
Hartland	Beadle
Hartland	Kingsbury
Havana	Deuel
Hayti	Hamlin
Hecla	Brown
Henden	Miner
Henry	Brown
Henry	Codington
Herman	Lake
Herrick	Deuel
Hickman	Marshall
Hidewood	Deuel
Highland	Brown
Highland	Brule
Highland	Charles Mix
Highland	Day
Highland	Lincoln
Highland	Minnehaha
Hiland	Hand
Hillsdale	Faulk
Hillside	Edmunds
Hoffman	McPherson
Holden	Hand
Holland	Douglas
Holsclaw	Tripp
Home	Turner
Homer	Day
Hopper	Aurora
Horse Creek	Perkins
Hosmer	Edmunds
Howard	Charles Mix
Howard	Meade
Howard	Miner
Hudson	Edmunds
Huggins	Tripp
Hulbert	Hand
Humboldt	Minnehaha
Huntley	Edmunds
Hurley	Turner
Huron	Pennington
Ideal	Tripp
Imlay	Pennington
Independence	Day
Independence	Douglas
Interior	Jackson
Iona	Lyman
Iowa	Beadle
Iowa	Douglas
Ipswich	Edmunds
Iroquois	Kingsbury
Irving	Faulk
Irwin	Tripp
Jackson	Charles Mix
Jackson	Sanborn
Jamesville	Yankton
Jasper	Hanson
Jefferson	McCook
Jefferson	Moody
Jefferson	Spink
Jefferson	Union
Jewett	Jackson
Jones	Gregory
Jordan	Tripp
Joubert	Douglas
Kampeska	Codington
Kassel	Hutchinson
Kaylor	Hutchinson
Kellogg	Beadle
Kennedy	Charles Mix
Kent	Edmunds
Keyapaha	Tripp
Kidder	Day
Kilborn	Grant
Kimball	Brule
King	Tripp
Kolls	Jones
Kosciusko	Day
Kranzburg	Codington
Kulm	Hutchinson
La Belle	Marshall
La Prairie	Spink
La Roche	Charles Mix
La Valley	Lincoln
Lafoon	Faulk
Lake Byron	Beadle
Lake Creek	Pennington
Lake Flat	Pennington
Lake George	Charles Mix
Lake Hendricks	Brookings
Lake Hill	Pennington
Lake Sinai	Brookings
Lake	Aurora
Lake	Clark
Lake	Codington
Lake	Marshall
Lake	Roberts
Lake	Spink
Lake	Tripp
Lake View	Lake
Lakeside	Meade
Laketon	Brookings
Lamro	Tripp
Landing Creek	Gregory
Lansing	Brown
Lawrence	Charles Mix
Lawrence	Roberts
Le Roy	Lake
Le Sueur	Kingsbury
Lee	Roberts
Leola	Codington
Letcher	Sanborn
Liberty	Beadle
Liberty	Brown
Liberty	Day
Liberty	Edmunds
Liberty	Hutchinson
Liberty	Perkins
Lien	Roberts
Lincoln	Brown
Lincoln	Clark
Lincoln	Douglas
Lincoln	Lincoln
Lincoln	Perkins
Lincoln	Spink
Lincoln	Tripp
Linn	Hand
Lisbon	Davison
Lockwood	Roberts
Lodgepole	Perkins
Lodi	Spink
Logan	Beadle
Logan	Clark
Logan	Hand
Logan	Jerauld
Logan	Minnehaha
Logan	Sanborn
Lone Rock	Moody
Lone Star	Tripp
Lone Tree	Charles Mix
Lone Tree	Perkins
Lone Tree	Tripp
Long Hollow	Roberts
Lowe	Deuel
Lowell	Marshall
Lura	Grant
Lynn	Day
Lynn	Lincoln
Lynn	Moody
Lyon	Brule
Lyons	Minnehaha
Madison	Edmunds
Madison	Grant
Maltby	Perkins
Manchester	Kingsbury
Mapleton	Minnehaha
Marindahl	Yankton
Marion	Turner
Marlar	Jerauld
Marshfield	Perkins
Martin	Perkins
Mathews	Kingsbury
Maydell	Clark
Mayfield	Yankton
Mazeppa	Grant
McKinley	Marshall
McNeely	Tripp
Meadow	Perkins
Meckling	Clay
Medary	Brookings
Mellette	Spink
Melrose	Grant
Mercier	Brown
Merton	Clark
Middleton	Turner
Midland	Hand
Milford	Beadle
Millboro	Tripp
Miller	Hand
Miller	Marshall
Milltown	Hutchinson
Miner	Miner
Minnesota	Roberts
Mission Hill	Yankton
Modena	Edmunds
Molan	Hutchinson
Mondamin	Hand
Monroe	Turner
Montpelier	Edmunds
Montrose	McCook
Moore	Charles Mix
Moreau	Perkins
Morgan	Jones
Morton	Day
Mosher	Mellette
Mount Pleasant	Clark
Mount Vernon	Davison
Mullen	Jones
Mussman	Jones
Myron	Faulk
Nance	Beadle
New Hope	Brown
New Surprise Valley	Mellette
Newark	Marshall
Newport	Marshall
Norden	Deuel
Norden	Hamlin
Nordland	Marshall
Norris	Mellette
North Bryant	Edmunds
North Detroit	Brown
Northville	Spink
Norway	Clay
Norway	Lincoln
Norway	Roberts
Norway	Turner
Nunda	Lake
Nutley	Day
Oacoma	Lyman
Oak Gulch	Day
Oak Hollow	Hutchinson
Oak Lake	Brookings
Oakwood	Brookings
Odessa	Edmunds
Ohio	Hand
Okaton	Jones
Ola	Brule
Olean	Spink
One Road	Roberts
Oneida	Sanborn
O'Neil	Faulk
Oneota	Brown
Ontario	Hand
Opdahl	Hamlin
Ordway	Brown
Orient	Faulk
Orland	Lake
Ortley	Roberts
Osceola	Brown
Osceola	Grant
Oslo	Brookings
Owanka	Pennington
Oxford	Hamlin
Palatine	Aurora
Palisade	Minnehaha
Palmyra	Brown
Park	Hand
Parker	Turner
Parnell	Brookings
Patten	Aurora
Pearl Creek	Beadle
Pearl	Hand
Pearl	McCook
Pelican	Codington
Pembrook	Edmunds
Peno	Pennington
Perry	Davison
Perry	Lincoln
Phipps	Codington
Pioneer	Faulk
Plain Center	Charles Mix
Plainfield	Brule
Plainview	Tripp
Plankinton	Aurora
Plano	Hanson
Plateau	Perkins
Plato	Hand
Platte	Charles Mix
Pleasant Grove	Brule
Pleasant Lake	Aurora
Pleasant Ridge	Corson
Pleasant	Clark
Pleasant	Hanson
Pleasant	Hutchinson
Pleasant	Jerauld
Pleasant	Lincoln
Pleasant	Lyman
Pleasant Valley	Aurora
Pleasant Valley	Clay
Pleasant Valley	Gregory
Pleasant Valley	Hand
Pleasant Valley	Marshall
Pleasant Valley	Tripp
Pleasant View	Beadle
Pleasant View	Tripp
Plummer	Brule
Portage	Brown
Portland	Deuel
Powell	Edmunds
Prairie Center	Clay
Prairie Center	Spink
Prairie	Union
Prairie View	Corson
Prairiewood	Brown
Pratt	Lyman
Preston	Brookings
Prospect	Mellette
Prosper	Davison
Provo	Fall River
Pukwana	Brule
Putney	Brown
Quinn	Pennington
Raber	Hughes
Racine	Day
Rainbow	Perkins
Rainy Creek/Cheyenne	Pennington
Rames	Tripp
Ramsey	McCook
Raritan	Day
Rauville	Codington
Ravenna	Sanborn
Ravinia	Brown
Raymond	Clark
Red Fish	Mellette
Red Iron Lake	Marshall
Red Lake	Brule
Red Rock	Minnehaha
Redfield	Spink
Redstone	Miner
Ree	Charles Mix
Rex	Lyman
Rhoda	Charles Mix
Richfield	Spink
Richland	Beadle
Richland	Brookings
Richland	Brown
Richland	Brule
Richland	Clark
Richland	Codington
Richland	Edmunds
Richland	McCook
Ridgeland	Corson
Ring Thunder	Mellette
Riverside	Brown
Riverside	Clay
Riverside	Hand
Riverside	Mellette
Riverview	Moody
Robins	Fall River
Rock Creek	Miner
Rockdale	Hand
Rockford	Perkins
Rocky Ford	Mellette
Rolling Green	Corson
Rome	Davison
Rome	Deuel
Rose Hill	Hand
Rose	Lyman
Rosebud	Mellette
Rosedale	Clark
Rosedale	Hanson
Rosedale	Tripp
Rosefield	Turner
Roseland	Tripp
Rosette	Edmunds
Roswell	Miner
Rouse	Charles Mix
Running Bird	Mellette
Rusk	Day
Rutland	Lake
Saint Lawrence	Hand
Saint Onge	Lawrence
Salem	McCook
Salem	Turner
Sand Creek	Beadle
Sangamon	Edmunds
Saratoga	Faulk
Savo	Brown
Scandinavia	Deuel
Scenic	Pennington
Schriever	Gregory
Scotch Cap	Perkins
Scotland	Day
Scovil	Jones
Sharon	Hutchinson
Shelby	Brown
Sheridan	Codington
Sherman	Brookings
Sherman	Corson
Sherman	Faulk
Shyne	Pennington
Sidney	Perkins
Signal	Charles Mix
Silver Creek	Sanborn
Silver Lake	Hutchinson
Sioux Valley	Union
Sisseton	Marshall
Sisseton	Roberts
Smith	Brule
Smithville	Meade
South Creek	Jones
South Detroit	Brown
Spink	Union
Spirit Lake	Kingsbury
Spirit Mound	Clay
Split Rock	Minnehaha
Spring Creek	Moody
Spring Grove	Roberts
Spring Hill	Hand
Spring Lake	Hand
Spring Lake	Hanson
Spring Lake	Kingsbury
Spring	Spink
Spring Valley	Clark
Spring Valley	McCook
Spring Valley	Turner
Springdale	Lincoln
Springdale	Roberts
Star Prairie	Tripp
Star	Clay
Star Valley	Gregory
Star Valley	Tripp
Starr	Hutchinson
Stena	Marshall
Sterling	Brookings
Stewart	Tripp
Stockholm	Grant
Strool	Perkins
Sully	Tripp
Summit	Lake
Summit	Roberts
Sumner	Spink
Sun Prairie	McCook
Sunnyside	Pennington
Surprise Valley	Mellette
Susquehanna	Hutchinson
Sverdrup	Minnehaha
Swan Lake	Turner
Sweet	Hutchinson
Tamworth	Faulk
Taopi	Minnehaha
Taylor	Hanson
Taylor	Tripp
Tetonka	Spink
Theresa	Beadle
Thorp	Clark
Three Rivers	Spink
Tobin	Davison
Torrey Lake	Brule
Trail	Perkins
Trenton	Brookings
Troy	Day
Troy	Grant
Truro	Aurora
Tulare	Spink
Turkey Valley	Yankton
Turner	Turner
Turton	Spink
Twin Brooks	Grant
Twin Lake	Sanborn
Union	Brule
Union	Butte
Union	Davison
Union	Day
Union	Edmunds
Union	Faulk
Union	McCook
Union	Meade
Union	Moody
Union	Sanborn
Union	Spink
Upper Red Owl	Meade
Utica	Yankton
Vail	Perkins
Vale	Butte
Valley Springs	Minnehaha
Valley	Beadle
Valley	Day
Valley	Douglas
Valley	Hutchinson
Valley	Hyde
Valley	Tripp
Veblen	Marshall
Vermillion	Clay
Vermillion	Miner
Vermont	Edmunds
Vernon	Beadle
Vernon	Grant
Vickers	Perkins
Victor	Marshall
Victor	Roberts
Viking	Perkins
Viola	Jerauld
Virgil	Jones
Virginia	Union
Vivian	Lyman
Volga	Brookings
Volin	Yankton
Vrooman	Perkins
Wachter	McPherson
Wacker	McPherson
Wahehe	Charles Mix
Wakpala	Corson
Waldro	Brule
Wall Lake	Minnehaha
Wall	Jackson
Walnut Grove	Douglas
Walshtown	Yankton
Ward	Moody
Warner	Brown
Warren	Clark
Warren	Sanborn
Washington	Aurora
Washington	Clark
Washington	Douglas
Wasta	Pennington
Watauga	Corson
Waubay	Day
Waverly	Codington
Waverly	Marshall
Wayne	Hanson
Wayne	Lake
Wayne	Minnehaha
Weaver	Tripp
Weber	McPherson
Webster	Day
Wellington	Minnehaha
Wells	Perkins
Wentworth	Lake
Wesley	Faulk
Wessington Springs	Jerauld
Wessington	Beadle
West Hanson	Brown
West Point	Brule
West Rondell	Brown
Weston	Marshall
Westport	Brown
Weta	Jackson
Wheatland	Day
Wheaton	Hand
White Butte	Perkins
White Lake	Aurora
White Rock	Roberts
White Swan	Charles Mix
White	Marshall
Whiteside	Beadle
Whitewood	Kingsbury
Wilbur	Brule
William Hamilton	Hyde
Williams Creek	Jones
Willow Creek	Tripp
Willow Lake	Brule
Wilson	Perkins
Wilson	Tripp
Winfred	Lake
Winsor	Brookings
Wismer	Marshall
Witten	Tripp
Wittenberg	Hutchinson
Wolf Creek	Hutchinson
Wolsey	Beadle
Woodland	Clark
Woonsocket	Sanborn
Worthen	Hanson
Wortman	Tripp
Wright	Tripp
York	Day
York	Hand
Zell	Faulk
Zickrick	Jones

== See also ==
- List of counties in South Dakota
- List of cities in South Dakota
- List of towns in South Dakota
