= Lone Tree Township =

Lone Tree Township may refer to:

- Lone Tree Township, Clay County, Iowa
- Lone Tree Township, McPherson County, Kansas
- Lone Tree Township, Chippewa County, Minnesota
- Lone Tree Township, Clay County, Nebraska
- Lone Tree Township, Merrick County, Nebraska
- Lone Tree Township, Golden Valley County, North Dakota, in Golden Valley County, North Dakota
- Lone Tree Township, Charles Mix County, South Dakota, in Charles Mix County, South Dakota
- Lone Tree Township, Perkins County, South Dakota, in Perkins County, South Dakota
- Lone Tree Township, Tripp County, South Dakota, in Tripp County, South Dakota
