= Lone Tree Township, Nebraska =

Lone Tree Township, Nebraska may refer to one of the following places:

- Lone Tree Township, Clay County, Nebraska
- Lone Tree Township, Merrick County, Nebraska

== See also ==
- Lone Tree Township (disambiguation)
