= Lake Creek Township =

Lake Creek Township may refer to:

- Lake Creek Township, Calhoun County, Iowa
- Lake Creek Township, Pettis County, Missouri
- Lake Creek Township, Bladen County, North Carolina, in Bladen County, North Carolina
- Lake Creek Township, Pennington County, South Dakota
