= Englewood Township, Perkins County, South Dakota =

Englewood Township, South Dakota
- Township
- Location within South Dakota
- Coordinates: 45°15′22″N 102°7′0″W
- Country: United States
- State: South Dakota
- County: Perkins

Area
  - Total: 64.8 sq mi (168 km^{2})

Population (2020)
  - Total: 16
  - Density: 0.2/sq mi (0.077/km^{2})

Englewood Township is a township in Perkins County, in the U.S. state of South Dakota. As of the 2020 census, it contains 16 people and 9 households.

== Major highways ==
South Dakota Highway 73

== Communities ==
Usta
