= Prairie City, South Dakota =

Prairie City
- Unincorporated community
- Location within the state of South Dakota Prairie City (the United States)
- Coordinates: 45°31′52″N 102°48′59″W
- Country: United States
- State: South Dakota
- County: Perkins
- Township: Strool

Area
  - Total: 1.42 sq mi (3.68 km^{2})
  - Land: 1.41 sq mi (3.65 km^{2})
  - Water: 0.050 sq mi (0.13 km^{2})
- Elevation: 2,861 ft (872 m)

Population (2020)
  - Total: 25
  - Density: 18/sq mi (6.8/km^{2})
- Time zone: UTC-6 (Central (CST))
  - Summer (DST): UTC-5 (CDT)
- ZIP codes: 57649
- Area code: 605
- GNIS feature ID: 2584566

Prairie City is an unincorporated community and census-designated place in Perkins County, South Dakota, United States. One of many rural settlements in Perkins County, the town was founded in 1946 by former residents of Strool. The population of the CDP was 25 at the 2020 census.

== History ==
Prairie City was founded in 1946 by Dutch Stalder, and built up by former residents of Strool. The town of Strool was entirely owned by its founder, homesteader Ben Strool, who rented out land to residents and businesses, but did not sell any of it. Since this meant Strool's residents and business-owners did not own their property, they were reluctant to construct buildings with permanent features like basements, for fear they could lose the buildings they had invested in. Moreover, both a railroad and a highway—which had initially been slated to pass through Strool—were later built several miles away, bypassing the area and making it inconvenient to reach.

By 1946, some residents of Strool had decided to relocate two miles north and form the settlement of Prairie City. Comparatively, Prairie City would be closer to the highway and allow settlers to purchase land. The move to Prairie City was hastened by multiple factors, including the arrival of electrical infrastructure in 1952 (as settlers did not want to install electricity in rented property), Ben Strool's death in 1949, and a subsequent feud over the ownership of the settlement. The relocation was largely complete by 1955, and with so many settlers moving to Prairie City in such a short span of time, Prairie City briefly earned the title of "the fastest-growing town" in South Dakota.

Prairie City's post office was established in 1955. In 2009, Prairie City's post office was shut down, though the CDP kept its 57649 ZIP code. Its postal services are now handled by the town of Bison.

Prairie City was first recorded as a census-designated place in the 2010 census.

== Demographics ==
Historical population
Census	Pop.	Note	%±
2010	23		—
2020	25		8.7%
U.S. Decennial Census

=== 2020 census ===
Prairie City racial composition
Race	Num.	Perc.
White	20	80.0%
Black or African American	0	0.0%
Native American	2	8.0%
Asian	1	4.0%
Pacific Islander	0	0.0%
Other/Mixed	2	8.0%
Hispanic or Latino	2	8.0%

At the 2020 United States census, there were 25 people living in Prairie City. The population density was 17.7 people per square mile (6.8/km^{2}), with 18 housing units at an average density of 12.8 per square mile (4.9/km^{2}).

=== 2010 census ===
At the 2010 United States census, there were 23 people, 9 households, and 4 families living in Prairie City. The population density was 16.2 people per square mile (6.3/km^{2}), with 14 housing units at an average density of 9.9 per square mile (3.8/km^{2}). The racial makeup was 100% white.

There were 9 households, of which 1 (2.3%) had children under the age of 18 living with them, 3 (33.3%) were married couples living together, 1 (2.3%) had a female householder with no husband present, and 5 (55.5%) were non-families. All 5 households were made up of individuals, and 2 (22.2%) had someone living alone who was 65 years of age or older. The average household size was 2.56, and the average family size was 4.50.

The population was spread out, with 9 people (39.1%) under the age of 18, 1 person (4.3%) aged 18 to 24, 2 people (8.7%) aged 25 to 44, 9 people (39.1%) aged 45 to 64, and 2 people (8.7%) who were 65 years of age or older. The median age was 43.5 years. For every 100 females, there were 76.9 males.

== Notable people ==
- J. Sam Marty (b. 1947), politician
- Betty Olson (b. 1946), politician
