= Porter Sculpture Park =

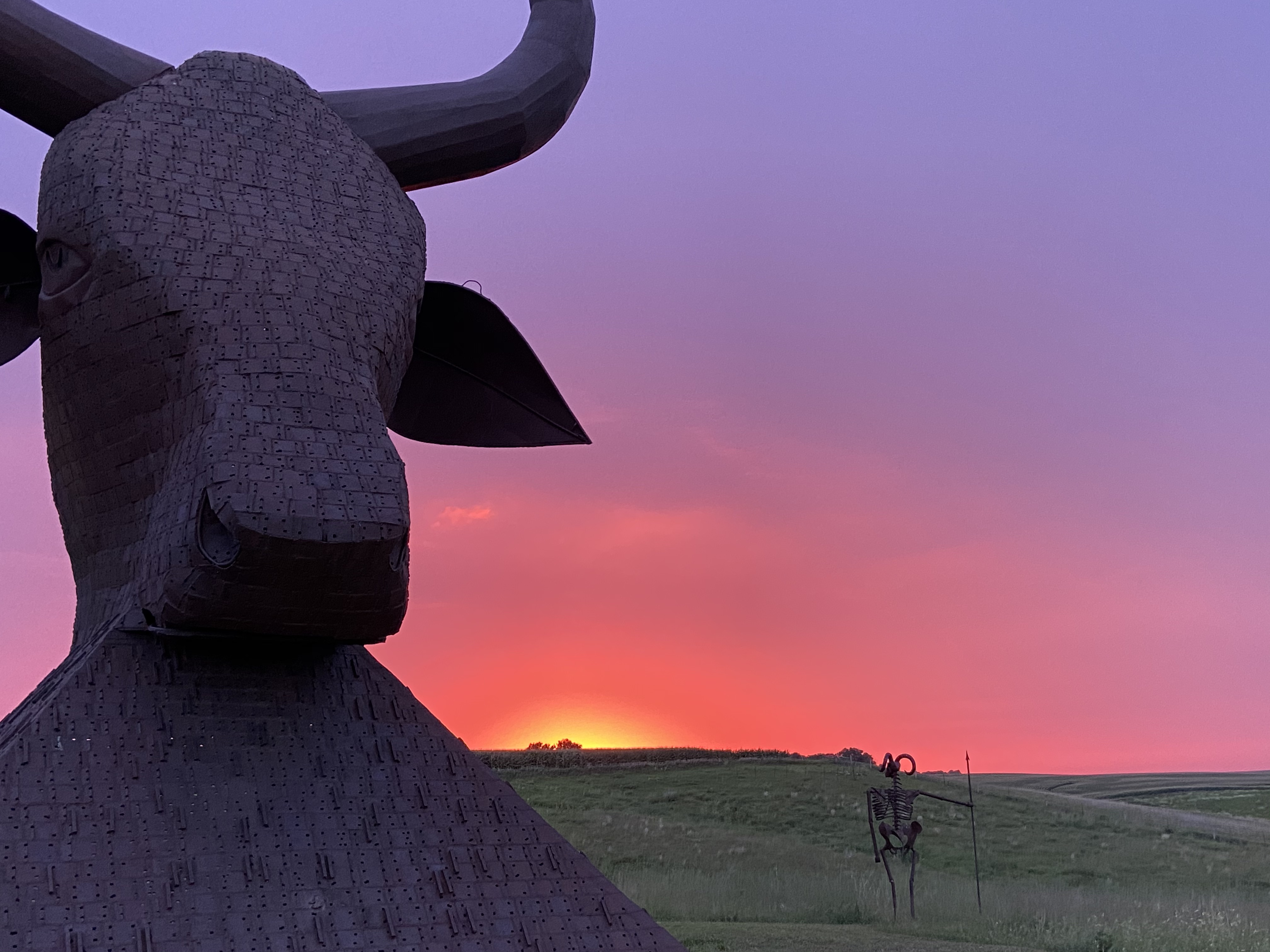
- The Bull's Head, the largest sculpture in the park
- Established: 2000
- Location: Montrose, South Dakota, United States
- Coordinates: 43°39′51″N 97°10′50″W
- Type: Sculpture park
- Collection size: More than 60 sculptures
- Website: portersculpturepark.com

Porter Sculpture Park is an outdoor sculpture park near Montrose, South Dakota. The sculpture park is located just adjacent to Interstate 90 and is about 25 miles west of Sioux Falls, on the eastern edge of McCook County). It is on the South Dakota Drift Prairie, only 1/4 of a mile off of the interstate. There are over 60 sculptures in the park, which is situated on 10 acres of tallgrass prairie.

Many of the sculptures, in the style of industrial art, were made with scrap metal, old farm equipment, or railroad tie plates. The largest sculpture in the park is a 60-foot-tall (18 m) bull head. This sculpture took three years to build, weighs 25 tons, and is equal in size to the heads of Mount Rushmore. Every sculpture in the park was made by Wayne Porter.

The park is open May 15 – October 15 annually. Admission is $10 per adult, $5 for ages 13–17, and free for ages 12 and under.

== History of the artist and Porter Sculpture Park ==
=== Artist ===
Wayne Porter is a sculptor who grew up in rural South Dakota and learned to weld as a child in his father's blacksmith shop. He has never taken an art class. He made his first small sculpture at the age of 10.

After graduating from South Dakota State University in Brookings with degrees in political science and history, he was a sheep rancher for a few years and worked on sculptures in his free time.

=== Art ===
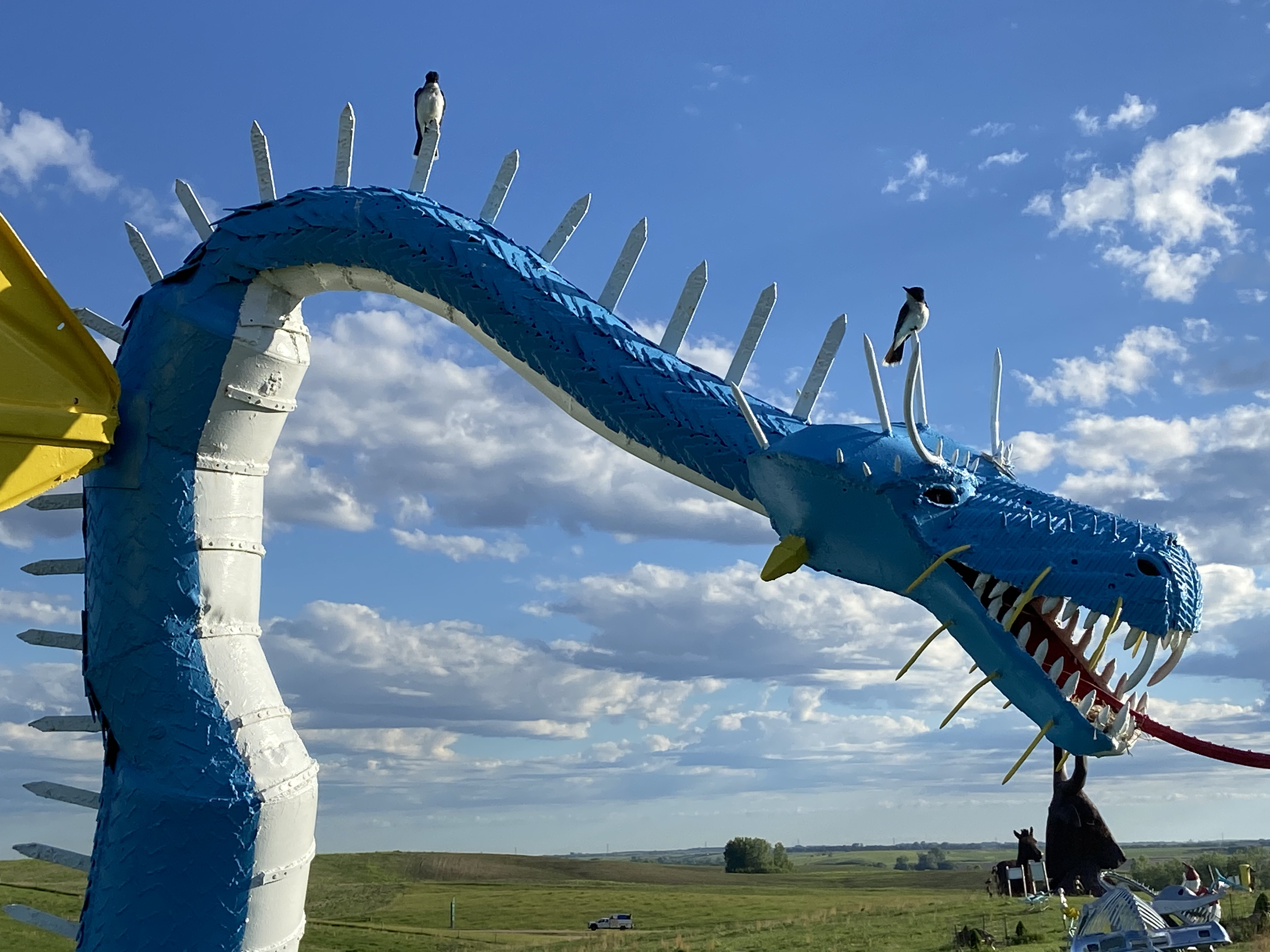
The Blue Dragon

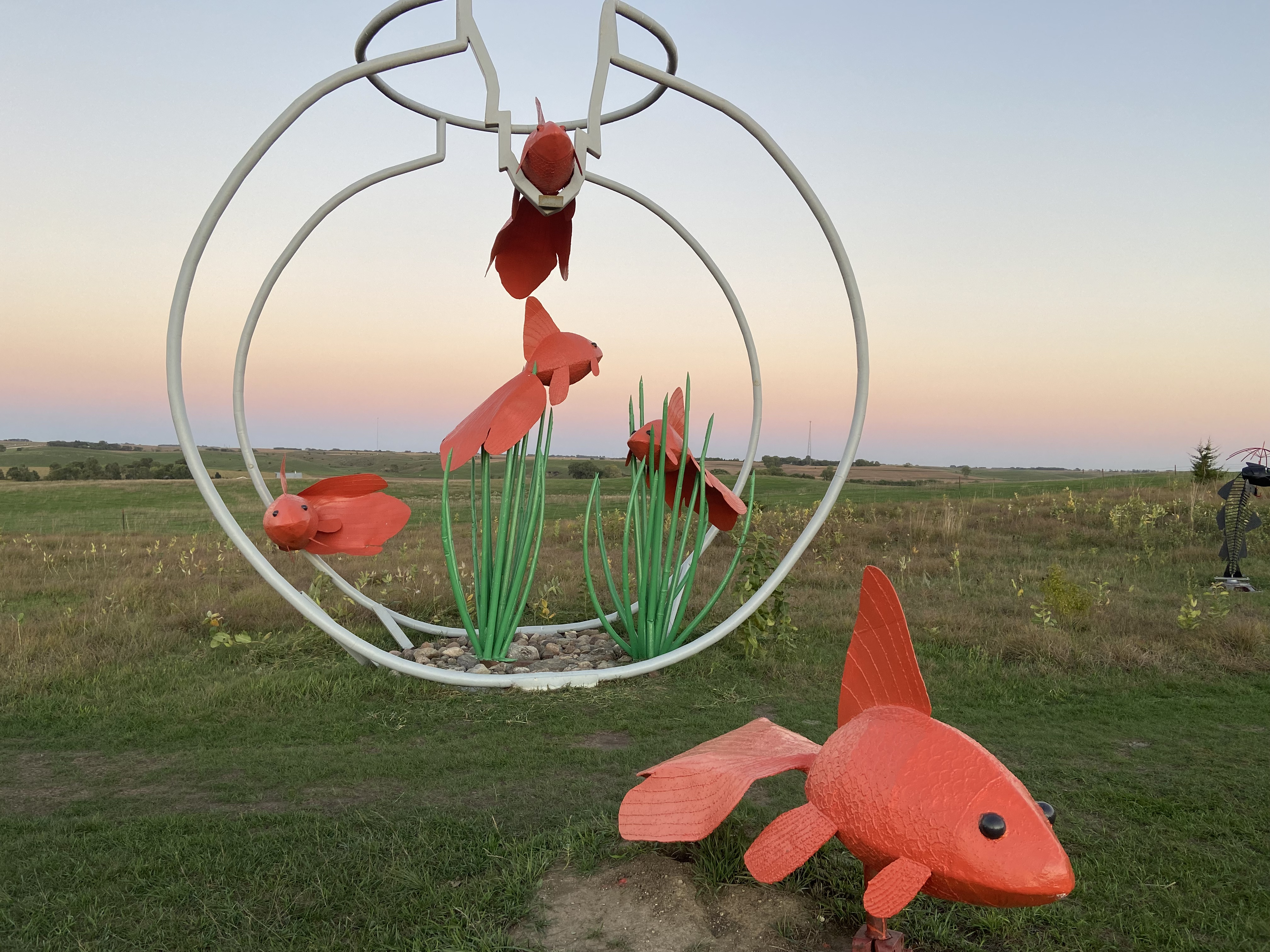
The GoldFish Bowl

Many of his sculptures are large, and most of the early pieces are made from junk/found metal, including the bumper of an old family car, an antique water heater from the local dump, and pieces of old farm machinery.

Poetry written by Porter accompanies many of the sculptures. The sculptures are majestic, whimsical, thought-provoking, and readily display the influences of the South Dakota prairies Porter grew up on. They reflect his quick wit, humor, and diverse influences.

=== Sculpture park ===
Wayne Porter opened the park in the fall of 2000. He had been ranching and creating sculptures for several years, and the art piled up outside of his Dad's blacksmith shop.

Over time, cars and buses would come off the highway that runs through the small town of St. Lawrence, South Dakota (pop. 200) to see his sculptures and want to pay him. Porter opted to discontinue sheep ranching in favor of working on the sculpture gallery.

Porter sought land near Interstate 90 to make his sculptures more accessible to tourists and was able to move his sculptures to the current location and open Porter Sculpture Park. The artist continues to make new art in the blacksmith shop where he learned to weld during the offseason and moves the sculptures to the park when they are finished.

=== Prairie ===
Porter has been working to restore the prairie to a native South Dakota tallgrass prairie. His farmer friend's cows are in the park in the spring before the park opens to give birth to their calves and eat the grass. Healthy prairies require this or an annual burn.

It took a few years to see native flowers and grasses returning, and the restoration continues to be a work in progress.

== Book ==
A book about Wayne Porter's life, art, processes, inspiration and business planning was published in 2025: The Power of the Bull: Inside the Head of Sculptor Wayne Porter by Sue Speck.
