= Foster Township =

Foster Township may refer to:

- Foster Township, Randolph County, Arkansas, in Randolph County, Arkansas
- Foster Township, Madison County, Illinois
- Foster Township, Marion County, Illinois
- Foster Township, Michigan
- Foster Township, Big Stone County, Minnesota
- Foster Township, Faribault County, Minnesota
- Foster Township, Luzerne County, Pennsylvania
- Foster Township, McKean County, Pennsylvania
- Foster Township, Schuylkill County, Pennsylvania
- Foster Township, Beadle County, South Dakota, in Beadle County, South Dakota
- Foster Township, Hutchinson County, South Dakota, in Hutchinson County, South Dakota
- Foster Township, Perkins County, South Dakota, in Perkins County, South Dakota
