= Hall Township, Perkins County, South Dakota =

Hall Township, South Dakota
- Township
- Location within South Dakota
- Coordinates: 45°20′35″N 102°31′47″W
- Country: United States
- State: South Dakota
- County: Perkins

Population (2019 est.)
  - Total: 17

Hall Township is a township in Perkins County, in the U.S. state of South Dakota. Its estimated population in 2019 was 17.
