= Grassland Colony, South Dakota =

- Census-designated place
- Location within South Dakota Location within the United States
- Coordinates: 45°40′06″N 98°47′47″W
- Country: United States
- State: South Dakota
- County: McPherson

Area
  - Total: 0.42 sq mi (1.10 km^{2})
  - Land: 0.42 sq mi (1.10 km^{2})
  - Water: 0 sq mi (0.00 km^{2})
- Elevation: 1,486 ft (453 m)

Population (2020)
  - Total: 127
  - Density: 297.9/sq mi (115.01/km^{2})
- Time zone: UTC-6 (Central (CST))
  - Summer (DST): UTC-5 (CDT)
- ZIP Code: 57481 (Wetonka)
- Area code: 605
- FIPS code: 46-25741
- GNIS feature ID: 2813047

Grassland Colony is a census-designated place (CDP) and Hutterite colony in McPherson County, South Dakota, United States. It was first listed as a CDP prior to the 2020 census. The population of the CDP was 127 at the 2020 census.

It is in the southeast part of the county, 4 miles (6 km) by road north-northwest of Wetonka and 11 miles (18 km) southeast of Leola, the county seat.

== Demographics ==
Historical population
| Census | Pop. | Note | %± |
|---|---|---|---|
| 2020 | 127 | | — |
U.S. Decennial Census
