= Maltby Township, Perkins County, South Dakota =

Maltby Township, South Dakota
- Township
- Location within South Dakota
- Coordinates: 45°25′52″N 102°45′34″W
- Country: United States
- State: South Dakota
- County: Perkins

Population (2020)
  - Total: 11

Maltby Township (ZIP code 57649) is a township in Perkins County, in the U.S. state of South Dakota. As of the 2020 census, it contains 11 people.
