= Chaudoin =

Chaudoin may refer to:

- Chaudoin Township, Perkins County, South Dakota, township in the United States
- Mount Chaudoin, mountain in Victoria Land, Antarctica
