= Flat Creek Township, Perkins County, South Dakota =

Flat Creek Township, South Dakota
- Township
- Location within South Dakota
- Coordinates: 45°51′41″N 102°15′39″W
- Country: United States
- State: South Dakota
- County: Perkins

Area
  - Total: 35.9 sq mi (93 km^{2})

Population (2020)
  - Total: 19
  - Density: 0.5/sq mi (0.19/km^{2})

Flat Creek Township is a township in Perkins County, in the U.S. state of South Dakota. As of the 2020 census, it contains 19 people and 9 households.
