= Greenland Township, McCook County, South Dakota =

Greenland Township
- Township
- Location within South Dakota
- Coordinates: 43°37′49″N 97°11′20″W
- Country: United States
- State: South Dakota
- County: McCook

Area
  - Total: 34.7 sq mi (90 km^{2})
  - Water: 1 sq mi (2.6 km^{2})

Population
  - Total: 323

Greenland Township is a township in McCook County, South Dakota, United States. The population was 323 at the 2020 census.

== Geography ==
Greenland Township has a land area of 34.7 square miles. Lake Vermillion is located within the township. ~1 square miles is water.
