= Orland Colony, South Dakota =

- Census-designated place
- Location within South Dakota Location within the United States
- Coordinates: 43°49′18″N 97°11′56″W
- Country: United States
- State: South Dakota
- County: McCook

Area
  - Total: 0.51 sq mi (1.31 km^{2})
  - Land: 0.51 sq mi (1.31 km^{2})
  - Water: 0 sq mi (0.00 km^{2})
- Elevation: 1,739 ft (530 m)

Population (2020)
  - Total: 2
  - Density: 3.9/sq mi (1.52/km^{2})
- Time zone: UTC-6 (Central (CST))
  - Summer (DST): UTC-5 (CDT)
- ZIP Code: 57048 (Montrose)
- Area code: 605
- FIPS code: 46-47588
- GNIS feature ID: 2813044

Orland Colony is a census-designated place (CDP) and Hutterite colony in McCook County, South Dakota, United States. The population was 2 at the 2020 census. It was first listed as a CDP prior to the 2020 census.

It is in the northeast part of the county, 10 miles (16 km) by road north of Montrose and 16 miles (26 km) northeast of Salem, the county seat.

== Demographics ==
Historical population
Census	Pop.	Note	%±
2020	2		—
U.S. Decennial Census
