= Fredlund Township, Perkins County, South Dakota =

Fredlund Township, South Dakota
- Township
- Location within South Dakota
- Coordinates: 45°41′30″N 102°38′30″W
- Country: United States
- State: South Dakota
- County: Perkins

Population (2020)
  - Total: 0

Fredlund Township is a township in Perkins County, in the U.S. state of South Dakota. As of the 2020 census, its population is 0.

== Major highways ==
South Dakota Highway 75
