= Ada Township =

Ada Township may refer to:

- Ada Township, Michigan
- Ada Township, Dickey County, North Dakota
- Ada Township, Perkins County, South Dakota
