= Glendo Township, Perkins County, South Dakota =

Glendo Township, South Dakota
- Township
- Location within South Dakota
- Coordinates: 45°41′3″N 102°52′21″W
- Country: United States
- State: South Dakota
- County: Perkins

Population (2019 est.)
  - Total: 13

Glendo Township is a township in Perkins County, in the U.S. state of South Dakota. Its estimated population in 2019 was 13. The US census marked the township's population as 64 in 1920 and 76 in 1930.
