= Horse Creek Township, Perkins County, South Dakota =

Horse Creek Township, South Dakota
- Township
- Location within South Dakota
- Coordinates: 45°52′58″N 102°52′46″W
- Country: United States
- State: South Dakota
- County: Perkins

Area
  - Total: 52 sq mi (130 km^{2})

Population (2020)
  - Total: 0

Horse Creek Township is a township in Perkins County, in the U.S. state of South Dakota. As of the 2020 census, its population is 0.
