= Lodgepole Township, Perkins County, South Dakota =

Lodgepole Township, South Dakota
- Township
- Location within South Dakota
- Coordinates: 45°46′42″N 102°37′57″W
- Country: United States
- State: South Dakota
- County: Perkins

Area
  - Total: 36 sq mi (93 km^{2})

Population (2020)
  - Total: 25
  - Density: 0.7/sq mi (0.27/km^{2})

Lodgepole Township (ZIP code 57640) is a township in Perkins County, in the U.S. state of South Dakota. As of the 2020 census, it contains 25 people and 11 households.

== Major highways ==
South Dakota Highway 75

== Communities ==
Lodgepole
