= Foster Township, Minnesota =

Foster Township is the name of some places in the U.S. state of Minnesota:

- Foster Township, Big Stone County, Minnesota
- Foster Township, Faribault County, Minnesota

See also: Foster Township (disambiguation)
