= Long Lake Colony, South Dakota =

- Census-designated place
- Location within South Dakota Location within the United States
- Coordinates: 45°36′15″N 98°49′31″W
- Country: United States
- State: South Dakota
- County: McPherson

Area
  - Total: 0.68 sq mi (1.76 km^{2})
  - Land: 0.67 sq mi (1.73 km^{2})
  - Water: 0.012 sq mi (0.03 km^{2})
- Elevation: 1,470 ft (450 m)

Population (2020)
  - Total: 8
  - Density: 12.0/sq mi (4.63/km^{2})
- Time zone: UTC-6 (Central (CST))
  - Summer (DST): UTC-5 (CDT)
- ZIP Codes: 57481 (Wetonka); 57456 (Leola)
- Area code: 605
- FIPS code: 46-38900
- GNIS feature ID: 2807112

Long Lake Colony is a census-designated place (CDP) and Hutterite colony in McPherson County, South Dakota, United States. It was first listed as a CDP prior to the 2020 census. The population of the CDP was 8 at the 2020 census.

It is in the southeast part of the county, 4 miles (6 km) by road southwest of Wetonka and 14 miles (23 km) southeast of Leola, the county seat.

== Demographics ==
Historical population
Census	Pop.	Note	%±
2020	8		—
U.S. Decennial Census
