= Lake Vermillion Recreation Area =

State recreation area in South Dakota, United States

- Location within South Dakota Location within the United States
- Location: McCook County, South Dakota, United States
- Coordinates: 43°35′41″N 97°11′07″W
- Area: 267 acres (108 ha)
- Established: 1967
- Administrator: South Dakota Department of Game, Fish and Parks
- Website: Official website

Lake Vermillion Recreation Area is a South Dakota state recreation area in McCook County, South Dakota in the United States. The park is open for year-round recreation including camping, swimming, fishing, hiking and boating on Lake Vermillion.

== See also ==
- List of South Dakota state parks
