= Date, South Dakota =

Unincorporated community in South Dakota, U.S.

Coordinates: 45°22′02″N 102°40′47″W

Date is a ghost town in Perkins County, in the U.S. state of South Dakota.

== History ==
A post office called Date was established in 1900, and remained in operation until 1955. The community has the name of Date Peterson, an early settler.
