= Lone Tree Township, Perkins County, South Dakota =

Lone Tree Township, South Dakota
- Township
- Location within South Dakota
- Coordinates: 45°25′45″N 102°23′44″W
- Country: United States
- State: South Dakota
- County: Perkins

Area
  - Total: 35.6 sq mi (92 km^{2})

Population (2020)
  - Total: 30
  - Density: 0.8/sq mi (0.31/km^{2})

Lone Tree Township is a township in Perkins County, in the U.S. state of South Dakota. As of the 2020 census, it contains 30 people and 12 households.

== Geography ==
=== Lakes ===
Owen Lake
