= Golden View Colony, South Dakota =

- Census-designated place
- Location within South Dakota Location within the United States
- Coordinates: 43°41′44″N 97°26′55″W
- Country: United States
- State: South Dakota
- County: McCook

Area
  - Total: 1.00 sq mi (2.58 km^{2})
  - Land: 0.97 sq mi (2.50 km^{2})
  - Water: 0.031 sq mi (0.08 km^{2})
- Elevation: 1,499 ft (457 m)

Population (2020)
  - Total: 95
  - Density: 98.6/sq mi (38.06/km^{2})
- Time zone: UTC-6 (Central (CST))
  - Summer (DST): UTC-5 (CDT)
- ZIP Code: 57058 (Salem)
- Area code: 605
- FIPS code: 46-24760
- GNIS feature ID: 2813045

Golden View Colony is a census-designated place (CDP) corresponding to the Goldenview Hutterite colony in McCook County, South Dakota, United States. The population was 95 at the 2020 census. It was first listed as a CDP prior to the 2020 census.

It is in the west-central part of the county, 5 miles (8 km) by road southwest of Salem, the county seat.

== Demographics ==
Historical population
Census	Pop.	Note	%±
2020	95		—
U.S. Decennial Census
