= Strool, South Dakota =

Ghost town in South Dakota, U.S.

Strool
- Former settlement
- Location in South Dakota Location in the United States
- Coordinates: 45°30′02″N 102°48′18″W
- Country: United States
- State: South Dakota
- County: Perkins
- Established: 1908
- Dissolved: 1974
- Named for: Ben Strool

Area
  - Total: 160 acres (65 ha)
- Elevation: 2,854 ft (870 m)
- GNIS feature ID: 1258398

Strool is a ghost town in Perkins County, in the U.S. state of South Dakota. Founded by homesteader Benjamin Strool in 1908, Strool was noted for its thriving culture and baseball team, Jewish community, and practice of renting land rather than selling it.

Strool was formally disestablished in 1955, but the settlement was succeeded by Prairie City, located two miles away.

== History ==
=== Establishment and growth (1908–1946) ===
Strool was founded in 1908 by Benjamin Strool, a Latvian-Jewish immigrant and homesteader, who opened and operated the town's first general store. The community's initial years were marked by a population boom, with the post office opened the same year the town was founded.

In an unusual act for the time, residents of Strool did not purchase plots of land; instead, they paid a monthly rent to Ben Strool, who retained full ownership of the land. Most of the buildings in Strool were thus not built to be permanent structures: settlers did not want to construct overly-sturdy buildings or basements on land that could be sold by someone other than themselves. Despite this, many settlers established businesses in the area, including hotels, a bank, two schools, and multiple local businesses. The settlement also developed a small community culture, with a dance hall, its own newspaper, and a baseball team that became well-known in the area. Notably, Strool also had a large Jewish community, something uncommon for many homesteading communities (which tended to be Christian or Catholic).

Strool lacks official population data, as the settlement was never formally incorporated. The only official population count was recorded by the Federal Writer's Project in 1940, which placed Strool's population at 50. The settlement's peak population varies between sources: a 1998 feature in the Rapid City Journal claims the population was once as high as 500, while a 1956 edition of the Lead Daily Call placed the peak population at a mere 20 people. Sources have also contradicted themselves, with the Rapid City Journal asserting in 1970 asserting that Strool's population never surpassed 100.

Though Ben Strool became involved in state politics and later moved to Sioux Falls, he continued to manage the settlement for the rest of his life.

=== Move to Prairie City and disbandment (1946–present) ===
The fact that Strool consisted entirely of rented land caused difficulties for its settlers as time went on. Mr. Strool refused to sell land to anyone, meaning that none of the settlers held ownership of their property. This meant that Strool could not formally organize itself as a town, thus preventing some businesses from operating (as they could not obtain the necessary licenses outside of an established town). Additionally, when the Rural Electrification Act enabled many residents of rural South Dakota to electrify their properties in the 1950s, quite a few residents of Strool were hesitant to install electricity in buildings they could potentially lose down the line. Further complicating matters, the state Highway 8 was first planned to run through Strool, but its final location turned out to be two miles away—thus bypassing Strool entirely, and also making it difficult for the settlers to access the highway in bad weather.

As early as 1946, The Bison Courier reported plans of some of the settlers to move two miles north, placing the settlement closer to the newly-built highway, and rename the settlement Prairie City. The future of Strool was later called into question only three years later, when Ben Strool died in 1949: his homesteading land was expected to go to one of his children, but a woman named Reizel Hirschfield claimed to have married Mr. Strool shortly before his death, and presented a will that would have given her ownership of the land Strool was built on. Though there was no legal record of Hirschfield's and Strool's marriage, and Strool's son Beryl contested her claim, Hirschfield won ownership of the settlement. Her attempts to have the remaining residents purchase the land were unsuccessful, and most relocated to Prairie City by 1955. Prairie City was dubbed the fastest-growing city of 1955 in the state.

The Strool post office was closed in 1955, having been renamed and moved to Prairie City. According to the South Dakota Historical Society, the land was divided and sold to two separate owners in 1974, and the remaining buildings were razed. Though Prairie City is generally considered Strool's successor, the only remaining structure near the original site of Strool is a fence.
