= Bixby, South Dakota =

Unincorporated community in South Dakota, U.S.

Coordinates: 45°08′54″N 102°33′43″W

Bixby is a ghost town in Perkins County, in the U.S. state of South Dakota. The GNIS classifies it as a populated place.

== History ==
A post office was established at Bixby in 1895, and remained in operation until 1951. The community derives its name from the nearby BXB Ranch.
