= Foster Township, Perkins County, South Dakota =

Foster Township, South Dakota
- Township
- Location within South Dakota
- Coordinates: 45°20′47″N 102°7′9″W
- Country: United States
- State: South Dakota
- County: Perkins

Area
  - Total: 64.3 sq mi (167 km^{2})

Population (2020)
  - Total: 11
  - Density: 0.2/sq mi (0.077/km^{2})

Foster Township is a township in Perkins County, in the U.S. state of South Dakota. As of the 2020 census, it contains 11 people and 11 households.

== Major highways ==
South Dakota Highway 73
