= Imogene, South Dakota =

Ghost town in South Dakota, U.S.

Coordinates: 45°08′26″N 102°42′47″W

Imogene is a ghost town in Perkins County, in the U.S. state of South Dakota.

== History ==
A post office was established at Imogene in 1910, and remained in operation until 1943. The community has the name of Imogene Wheelock, an early postmaster's daughter.
