= Ordway Township, Brown County, South Dakota =

Township in Brown County, South Dakota

Coordinates: 45°33′11″N 98°24′45″W

Ordway Township is a township in Brown County, South Dakota, United States. As of the 2020 Census, its population was 254.

== Geography ==
Ordway Township has an elevation of 1306 feet
