= Sun Prairie Township, McCook County, South Dakota =

Sun Prairie Township, South Dakota
- Township
- Location within South Dakota
- Coordinates: 43°48′17″N 97°25′44″W
- Country: United States
- State: South Dakota
- County: McCook

Area
  - Total: 36.476 sq mi (94.47 km^{2})
  - Land: 36.476 sq mi (94.47 km^{2})
  - Water: 0 sq mi (0 km^{2})

Population (2020)
  - Total: 140
  - Density: 3.8/sq mi (1.5/km^{2})
- Time zone: UTC-6 (Central (CST))
  - Summer (DST): UTC-5 (CDT)
- Area code: 605
- FIPS code: 46-62420
- GNIS feature ID: 1268993

Sun Prairie Township is a township in McCook County, South Dakota, United States. The population was 140 at the 2020 census.

== Geography ==
Sun Prairie Township has a total area of 36.476 square miles (94.47 km^{2}), all of it land.
