= New Hope Township, Brown County, South Dakota =

Township in Brown County, South Dakota

Coordinates: 45°17′N 98°40′W

New Hope Township is a township in Brown County, South Dakota, United States. As of the 2010 census, its population was 96.
