= Brainard Township, Brown County, South Dakota =

Township in Brown County, South Dakota

Coordinates: 45°42′16.30″N 98°21′47.52″W

Brainard township is a township in Brown County, South Dakota, United States. As of the 2020 census it had a population of 114.

== Geography ==
Brainard Township has an elevation of 1316 feet
