= Spring Creek Colony, South Dakota =

- Census-designated place
- Location within South Dakota Location within the United States
- Coordinates: 45°54′28″N 98°52′43″W
- Country: United States
- State: South Dakota
- County: McPherson

Area
  - Total: 0.30 sq mi (0.77 km^{2})
  - Land: 0.30 sq mi (0.77 km^{2})
  - Water: 0 sq mi (0.00 km^{2})
- Elevation: 1,667 ft (508 m)

Population (2020)
  - Total: 229
  - Density: 771.0/sq mi (297.67/km^{2})
- Time zone: UTC-6 (Central (CST))
  - Summer (DST): UTC-5 (CDT)
- ZIP Code: 58439 (Forbes, ND)
- Area code: 605
- FIPS code: 46-60540
- GNIS feature ID: 2813046

Spring Creek Colony is a census-designated place (CDP) and Hutterite colony in McPherson County, South Dakota, United States. It was first listed as a CDP prior to the 2020 census. The CDP had a population of 229 at the 2020 census.

It is in the northeast part of the county, 17 miles (27 km) by road north-northeast of Leola, the county seat. The closest community is Forbes, North Dakota, 6 miles (10 km) to the northeast.

== Demographics ==
Historical population
Census	Pop.	Note	%±
2020	229		—
U.S. Decennial Census
