= Ellingson, South Dakota =

Coordinates: 45°52′00″N 102°52′12″W

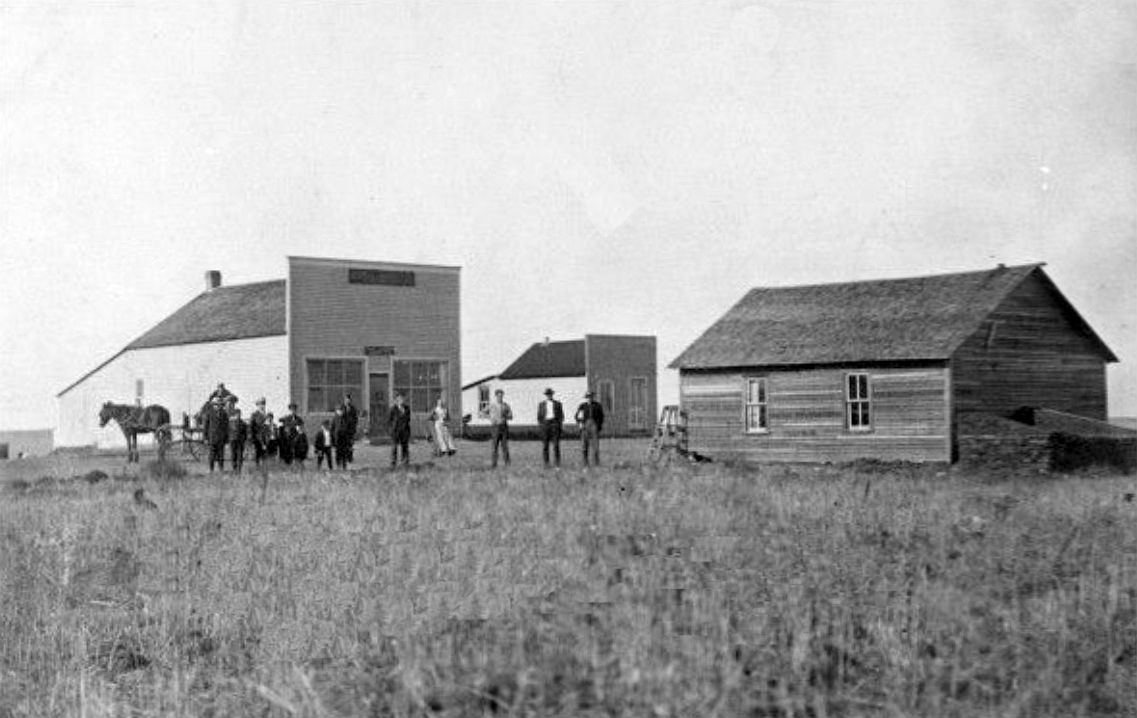
Ellingson, 1910

Ellingson is a ghost town in Perkins County, South Dakota, United States.

== History ==
A post office called Ellingson was established in 1908, and remained in operation until April, 1954. Andrew C. Ellingson, an early postmaster, gave the town his name.
