= Greenway, South Dakota =

Unincorporated community in South Dakota, U.S.

Coordinates: 45°54′35″N 99°42′39″W

Greenway is an unincorporated community in McPherson County, in the U.S. state of South Dakota.

== History ==
Greenway got its start in 1902 when the Milwaukee Railroad was extended to that point. A post office was established at Greenway in 1902, and remained in operation until 1976.
