= McCook County, South Dakota =

County in South Dakota, United States

- County
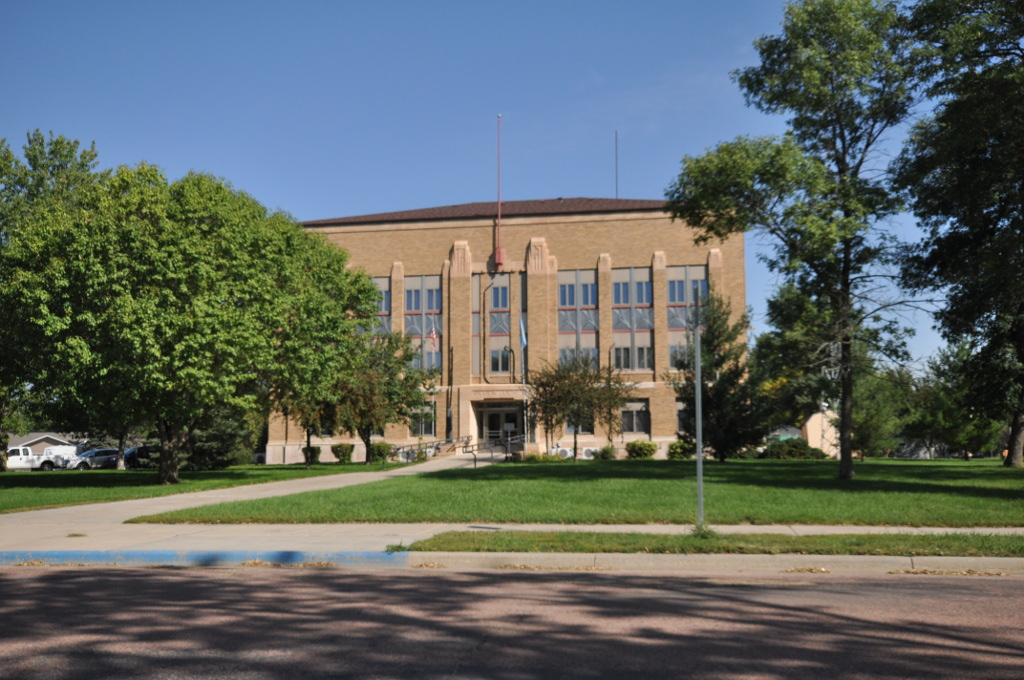
- McCook County Courthouse

- Location within the U.S. state of South Dakota
- Coordinates: 43°40′49.498″N 97°21′28.972″W
- Country: United States
- State: South Dakota
- Founded: January 8, 1873 (created); June 15, 1878 (organized)
- Named for: Edwin Stanton McCook
- Seat: Salem
- Largest city: Salem

Area
  - Total: 576.867 sq mi (1,494.08 km^{2})
  - Land: 574.205 sq mi (1,487.18 km^{2})
  - Water: 2.662 sq mi (6.89 km^{2}) 0.5%

Population (2020)
  - Total: 5,682
  - Estimate (2025): 5,964 ▲
  - Density: 10.4/sq mi (4.0/km^{2})
- Time zone: UTC−6 (Central)
  - Summer (DST): UTC−5 (CDT)
- Congressional district: At-large
- Website: mccookcountysd.gov

McCook County is a county in the U.S. state of South Dakota. As of the 2020 census, the population was 5,682. Its county seat is Salem. The county was established in 1873, and was organized in 1878. It was named for the former governor of the Dakota Territory and Civil War general Edwin Stanton McCook.

McCook County is part of the Sioux Falls metropolitan area.

== Geography ==
The terrain of McCook County consists of rolling hills, mostly devoted to agriculture. The terrain slopes to the south and southwest; its highest point is near its northeast corner, at 1,798 ft (548 m) ASL.

According to the United States Census Bureau, the county has a total area of 576.867 square miles (1,494.08 km^{2}), of which 574.205 square miles (1,487.18 km^{2}) is land and 2.662 square miles (6.89 km^{2}) (0.5%) is water. It is the 52nd largest county in South Dakota by total area.

=== Major highways ===
- Interstate 90
- U.S. Highway 81
- South Dakota Highway 38
- South Dakota Highway 42

=== Adjacent counties ===
- Lake County – northeast
- Minnehaha County – east
- Turner County – southeast
- Hutchinson County – southwest
- Hanson County – west
- Miner County – northwest

=== Protected areas ===
- Ediger State Game Production Area
- Forsch Lake State State Game Production Area
- Lake Vermillion State Recreation Area
- Lehrman Slough State Game production Area
- Tschetter Slough State Game Production Area

=== Lakes ===
- East Vermillion Lake AKA Lake Vermillion
- Island Lake
- Lake Eli
- Macke Lake

== Demographics ==
Historical population
Census	Pop.	Note	%±
1880	1,283		—
1890	6,448		402.6%
1900	8,689		34.8%
1910	9,589		10.4%
1920	9,990		4.2%
1930	10,316		3.3%
1940	9,793		−5.1%
1950	8,828		−9.9%
1960	8,268		−6.3%
1970	7,246		−12.4%
1980	6,444		−11.1%
1990	5,688		−11.7%
2000	5,832		2.5%
2010	5,618		−3.7%
2020	5,682		1.1%
2025 (est.)	5,964	▲	5.0%
U.S. Decennial Census:

=== 2020 census ===
As of the 2020 census, there were 5,682 people, 2,159 households, and 1,505 families residing in the county. The population density was 9.9 inhabitants per square mile (3.8/km^{2}). Of the residents, 25.4% were under the age of 18 and 20.1% were 65 years of age or older; the median age was 41.6 years. For every 100 females there were 100.8 males, and for every 100 females age 18 and over there were 98.4 males.

The racial makeup of the county was 93.6% White, 0.2% Black or African American, 1.2% American Indian and Alaska Native, 0.1% Asian, 1.3% from some other race, and 3.7% from two or more races. Hispanic or Latino residents of any race comprised 3.1% of the population.

There were 2,159 households in the county, of which 30.7% had children under the age of 18 living with them and 18.9% had a female householder with no spouse or partner present. About 26.1% of all households were made up of individuals and 13.3% had someone living alone who was 65 years of age or older.

There were 2,448 housing units, of which 11.8% were vacant. Among occupied housing units, 80.8% were owner-occupied and 19.2% were renter-occupied. The homeowner vacancy rate was 2.0% and the rental vacancy rate was 12.7%.

=== 2010 census ===
As of the 2010 census, there were 5,618 people, 2,168 households, and 1,535 families in the county. The population density was 9.8 inhabitants per square mile (3.8/km^{2}). There were 2,491 housing units at an average density of 4.3 units per square mile (1.7 units/km^{2}). The racial makeup of the county was 98.0% white, 0.4% American Indian, 0.1% Pacific islander, 0.1% Asian, 0.1% black or African American, 0.6% from other races, and 0.7% from two or more races. Those of Hispanic or Latino origin made up 1.8% of the population. In terms of ancestry, 61.5% were German, 12.8% were Irish, 11.1% were Norwegian, 7.4% were Swedish, 6.2% were Dutch, 5.2% were English, and 3.5% were American.

Of the 2,168 households, 30.4% had children under the age of 18 living with them, 61.0% were married couples living together, 6.0% had a female householder with no husband present, 29.2% were non-families, and 26.2% of all households were made up of individuals. The average household size was 2.45 and the average family size was 2.94. The median age was 42.7 years.

The median income for a household in the county was $42,022 and the median income for a family was $57,287. Males had a median income of $35,951 versus $29,750 for females. The per capita income for the county was $25,502. About 5.2% of families and 7.9% of the population were below the poverty line, including 6.7% of those under age 18 and 14.4% of those age 65 or over.

== Politics ==
McCook County voters usually vote Republican. Although the county was one only 130 nationwide to support favorite son George McGovern in 1972, it has selected the Democratic nominee in only six other elections since South Dakota's statehood, and none since 1980.

United States presidential election results for McCook County, South Dakota
Year	Republican		Democratic		Third party(ies)	
Year	No.	%	No.	%	No.	%
1892	573	37.35%	262	17.08%	699	45.57%
1896	678	39.03%	1,047	60.28%	12	0.69%
1900	978	49.07%	989	49.62%	26	1.30%
1904	1,284	63.00%	693	34.00%	61	2.99%
1908	1,209	57.00%	826	38.94%	86	4.05%
1912	0	0.00%	962	44.64%	1,193	55.36%
1916	1,194	52.19%	1,021	44.62%	73	3.19%
1920	1,864	60.52%	565	18.34%	651	21.14%
1924	1,368	44.27%	457	14.79%	1,265	40.94%
1928	2,234	55.78%	1,758	43.90%	13	0.32%
1932	1,436	32.47%	2,884	65.22%	102	2.31%
1936	2,117	43.64%	2,536	52.28%	198	4.08%
1940	3,310	66.12%	1,696	33.88%	0	0.00%
1944	2,516	68.39%	1,163	31.61%	0	0.00%
1948	2,064	59.46%	1,387	39.96%	20	0.58%
1952	2,991	72.63%	1,127	27.37%	0	0.00%
1956	2,382	57.54%	1,758	42.46%	0	0.00%
1960	2,375	56.93%	1,797	43.07%	0	0.00%
1964	1,756	44.60%	2,181	55.40%	0	0.00%
1968	1,959	51.55%	1,653	43.50%	188	4.95%
1972	1,963	49.53%	1,993	50.29%	7	0.18%
1976	1,744	48.74%	1,822	50.92%	12	0.34%
1980	2,014	56.83%	1,223	34.51%	307	8.66%
1984	1,902	56.57%	1,448	43.07%	12	0.36%
1988	1,501	50.00%	1,492	49.70%	9	0.30%
1992	1,177	39.44%	1,167	39.11%	640	21.45%
1996	1,292	47.45%	1,166	42.82%	265	9.73%
2000	1,610	61.19%	965	36.68%	56	2.13%
2004	2,017	61.66%	1,201	36.72%	53	1.62%
2008	1,646	55.89%	1,219	41.39%	80	2.72%
2012	1,655	63.34%	905	34.63%	53	2.03%
2016	1,794	69.35%	623	24.08%	170	6.57%
2020	2,068	71.31%	769	26.52%	63	2.17%
2024	2,227	73.47%	733	24.18%	71	2.34%

== Communities ==
=== Cities ===
- Bridgewater
- Canistota
- Montrose
- Salem (county seat)
- Spencer

=== Census-designated places ===
- Golden View Colony
- Orland Colony

=== Unincorporated communities ===
- Stanley Corner
- Unityville

=== Townships ===
The county is divided into sixteen townships:

- Benton
- Bridgewater
- Brookfield
- Canistota
- Emery
- Grant
- Greenland
- Jefferson
- Pearl
- Montrose
- Union
- Ramsey
- Richland
- Salem
- Spring Valley
- Sun Prairie

=== Other places ===
- Laurent - (proposed / abandoned housing development)
- Meadow View Colony - Hutterite Colony (Daughter colony of Millbrook Colony)

== See also ==
- National Register of Historic Places listings in McCook County, South Dakota
