= Clark Township, Perkins County, South Dakota =

Township in Perkins County, South Dakota

Coordinates: 45°36′30″N 102°7′30″W

Clark Township is a township in Perkins County, in the U.S. state of South Dakota. Its population was 10 as of the 2010 census.
