= Laurent, South Dakota =

Proposed community for the deaf and hard of hearing in South Dakota

Coordinates: 43°39′50″N 97°23′10″W

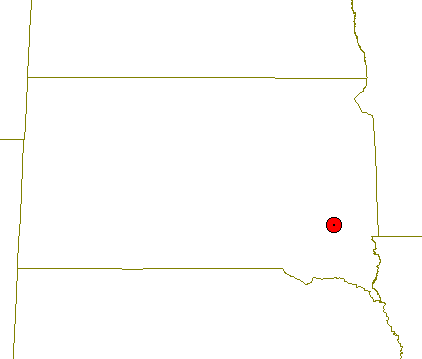
Location map of Laurent

Laurent was a proposed planned community south of Salem, South Dakota and was designed for Deaf, Hard of Hearing and other American Sign Language users. The town was to be named after Laurent Clerc; it was originally planned that the first residents would start moving into town in 2008.

The project was led by Marvin T. Miller, a deaf journalist and M. E. Barwacz (Miller's hearing mother-in-law). He claimed that the financing for the construction of the town, which was to encompass an area of 0.5 square miles (1.3 km^{2}), was secured by a combination of Miller's own funds and a group of private investors. At the peak of planning, 158 families had put themselves on a waiting list to move into the town. In the early stages of the project, Miller and Barwacz were invited to establish the townsite at Spencer, South Dakota as there were many available lots, but this offer was rejected in favor of the site near the I-90 / US 81 interchange.

As planning progressed, this project was the subject of much "pro" and "con" discussions, the "pro" discussion coming from various organizations including the National Association of the Deaf. On the "con" side, there was the Alexander Graham Bell Association for the Deaf and Hard of Hearing, who have argued that persons with "disabilities" should integrate into society rather than form an enclave. Also, a number of local residents had expressed concerns about the viability, economic aspects of the project, and its impact on the area.

By 2007, a number of factors combined that led Miller and Barwacz to dissolve the Laurent Company (which had been coordinating efforts to build the town) and relocate to Indiana: Miller and Barwacz had exhausted their own funds, the main "angel investor" that Miller had been depending on for $10 million in funding was unable to deliver, and most importantly to Miller, he had serious concerns over the quality of the education his children were receiving at the South Dakota School for the Deaf in Sioux Falls.

Once at Indiana, Miller made an attempt to interest the community there in his "signing town" concept, but it apparently was not well-received; no further word has surfaced regarding this project. The website Miller had created to promote his idea on-line has also long since ceased to exist.
