= Bison Township, Perkins County, South Dakota =

Township in Perkins County, South Dakota

Coordinates: 45°31′1″N 102°32′13″W

Bison Township is a township in Perkins County, in the U.S. state of South Dakota. Its population was 24 as of the 2010 census.
