= Vale Township, Butte County, South Dakota =

Township in Butte County, South Dakota

Coordinates: 44.6500°N 103.2917°W

Vale Township is one of the two townships of Butte County, South Dakota, United States; most of the rest of the county is unorganized territory. It lies in the southern part of the county.
