= Wachter Township, McPherson County, South Dakota =

Township in McPherson County, South Dakota

Wachter Township
- townships
- Interactive map of Wachter Township
- Coordinates: 45.8972°N 98.7861°W
- Country: United States
- State: South Dakota
- County: McPherson

Population (2019)
  - Total: 20

Wachter Township is one of the five townships of McPherson County, South Dakota, United States. It lies in the northeastern corner of the county and borders Carl Township and Weber Township within McPherson County.

In 2019, the population was 20.
