= Lincoln Township, Perkins County, South Dakota =

Township in Perkins County, South Dakota

Coordinates: 45°54′30″N 102°08′47″W

Lincoln Township is a township in Perkins County, South Dakota, USA. As of the 2000 census, its population was 174.
