= McPherson County, South Dakota =

County in South Dakota, United States

- County
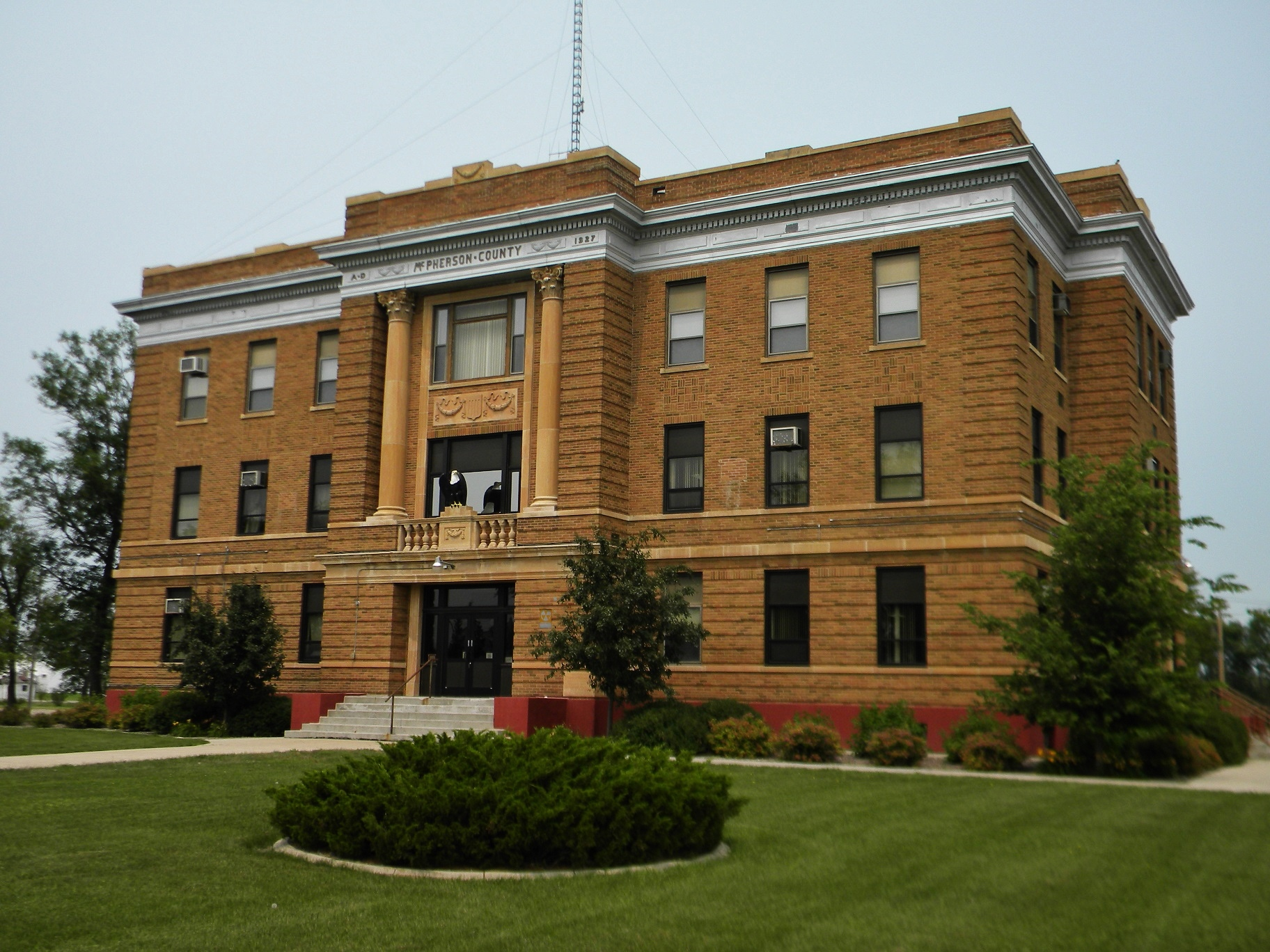
- McPherson County Courthouse

- Location within the U.S. state of South Dakota
- Coordinates: 45°47′3.296″N 99°12′41.115″W
- Country: United States
- State: South Dakota
- Created: 1873
- Organized: 1884
- Named for: James B. McPherson
- Seat: Leola
- Largest city: Eureka

Area
  - Total: 1,151.535 sq mi (2,982.46 km^{2})
  - Land: 1,136.668 sq mi (2,943.96 km^{2})
  - Water: 14.867 sq mi (38.51 km^{2}) 1.3%

Population (2020)
  - Total: 2,411
  - Estimate (2025): 2,347 ▼
  - Density: 2.1/sq mi (0.81/km^{2})
- Time zone: UTC−6 (Central)
  - Summer (DST): UTC−5 (CDT)
- Congressional district: At-large
- Website: mcpherson.sdcounty.gov

McPherson County is a county in the U.S. state of South Dakota. As of the 2020 census, the population was 2,411. Its county seat is Leola.

== History ==
The county was created in 1873 and organized in 1884. It is named for American Civil War General James B. McPherson.

== Geography ==
McPherson County lies on the north line of South Dakota. The north boundary line of McPherson County abuts the south boundary line of the state of North Dakota. Its terrain consists of rolling hills, largely devoted to agriculture, and dotted with small lakes and ponds. The terrain generally slopes to the south and east.

According to the United States Census Bureau, the county has a total area of 1,151.535 square miles (2,982.46 km^{2}), of which 1,136.668 square miles (2,943.96 km^{2}) is land and 14.867 square miles (38.51 km^{2}) (1.3%) is water. It is the 24th largest county in South Dakota by total area.

The Samuel H. Ordway Jr., Memorial Prairie, a 7,800-acre (3,200 ha) grassland owned by The Nature Conservancy on the south side of South Dakota Highway 10 about 10 miles (16 km) west of Leola, is home to a bison herd.

=== Major highways ===
- South Dakota Highway 10
- South Dakota Highway 45
- South Dakota Highway 47
- South Dakota Highway 247
- South Dakota Highway 239

=== Adjacent counties ===
- McIntosh County, North Dakota – north
- Dickey County, North Dakota – northeast
- Brown County – east
- Edmunds County – south
- Walworth County – southwest
- Campbell County – west

=== Protected areas ===
- Elm Lake State Game Production Area
- Moscow State Game Production Area
- Morlock State Game Production Area
- North Jackson State Game Production Area
- Odessa State Game Production Area
- Pfeiffle-Neuharth State Game Production Area
- Rath State Game Production Area
- Rosenthal State Game Production Area
- Schock State Game Production Area
- Schumacher State Game Production Area
- Simpson State Game Production Area
- School State Game Production Area
- South Jackson State Game Production Area
- Stout State Game Production Area
- Wageman State Game Production Area
- Wolff State Game Production Area

=== Lakes ===
- Crompton Lake
- Elm Lake (partial)
- Eureka Lake
- Feinstein Lake
- Hausauer Lake
- Heufel Lake
- Klooz Lake
- Long Lake

== Demographics ==
Historical population
Census	Pop.	Note	%±
1890	5,940		—
1900	6,327		6.5%
1910	6,791		7.3%
1920	7,705		13.5%
1930	8,774		13.9%
1940	8,353		−4.8%
1950	7,071		−15.3%
1960	5,821		−17.7%
1970	5,022		−13.7%
1980	4,027		−19.8%
1990	3,228		−19.8%
2000	2,904		−10.0%
2010	2,459		−15.3%
2020	2,411		−2.0%
2025 (est.)	2,347	▼	−2.7%
U.S. Decennial Census:

=== Survey estimates ===
As of the third quarter of 2024, the median home value in McPherson County was $81,400.

As of the 2023 American Community Survey, there are 896 estimated households in McPherson County with an average of 2.25 persons per household. The county has a median household income of $62,024. Approximately 15.4% of the county's population lives at or below the poverty line. McPherson County has an estimated 59.8% employment rate, with 22.4% of the population holding a bachelor's degree or higher and 81.0% holding a high school diploma.

The top five reported ancestries (people were allowed to report up to two ancestries, thus the figures will generally add to more than 100%) were English (83.4%), Spanish (0.8%), Indo-European (15.8%), Asian and Pacific Islander (0.0%), and Other (0.0%).

The median age in the county was 48.8 years.

McPherson County, South Dakota – racial and ethnic composition
Note: the US Census treats Hispanic/Latino as an ethnic category. This table excludes Latinos from the racial categories and assigns them to a separate category. Hispanics/Latinos may be of any race.

Race / ethnicity (NH = non-Hispanic)	Pop. 1980	Pop. 1990	Pop. 2000	Pop. 2010	Pop. 2020
White alone (NH)	4,018 (99.78%)	3,223 (99.85%)	2,880 (99.17%)	2,405 (97.80%)	2,265 (93.94%)
Black or African American alone (NH)	0 (0.00%)	1 (0.03%)	0 (0.00%)	1 (0.04%)	3 (0.12%)
Native American or Alaska Native alone (NH)	0 (0.00%)	2 (0.06%)	8 (0.28%)	1 (0.04%)	27 (1.12%)
Asian alone (NH)	1 (0.02%)	2 (0.06%)	4 (0.14%)	4 (0.16%)	3 (0.12%)
Pacific Islander alone (NH)	—	—	0 (0.00%)	3 (0.12%)	1 (0.04%)
Other race alone (NH)	6 (0.15%)	0 (0.00%)	0 (0.00%)	0 (0.00%)	0 (0.00%)
Mixed race or multiracial (NH)	—	—	6 (0.21%)	20 (0.81%)	59 (2.45%)
Hispanic or Latino (any race)	2 (0.05%)	0 (0.00%)	6 (0.21%)	25 (1.02%)	53 (2.20%)
Total	4,027 (100.00%)	3,228 (100.00%)	2,904 (100.00%)	2,459 (100.00%)	2,411 (100.00%)

=== 2020 census ===
As of the 2020 census, there were 2,411 people, 940 households, and 580 families residing in the county. The population density was 2.1 inhabitants per square mile (0.8/km^{2}). There were 1,258 housing units at an average density of 1.1 per square mile (0.4/km^{2}).

Of the residents counted by the 2020 census, 20.6% were under the age of 18 and 29.2% were 65 years of age or older; the median age was 51.6 years. For every 100 females there were 106.8 males, and for every 100 females age 18 and over there were 105.7 males.

The 2020 census reported the racial makeup of the county as 94.4% White, 0.1% Black or African American, 1.2% American Indian and Alaska Native, 0.2% Asian, 1.3% from some other race, and 2.8% from two or more races. Hispanic or Latino residents of any race comprised 2.2% of the population.

Of the 940 households, 21.8% had children under the age of 18 living with them and 20.3% had a female householder with no spouse or partner present. About 34.4% of all households were made up of individuals and 17.5% had someone living alone who was 65 years of age or older.

Of the county's 1,258 housing units, 25.3% were vacant. Among occupied housing units, 79.9% were owner-occupied and 20.1% were renter-occupied. The homeowner vacancy rate was 2.0% and the rental vacancy rate was 12.7%.

=== 2010 census ===
As of the 2010 census, there were 2,459 people, 1,025 households, and 632 families in the county. The population density was 2.2 inhabitants per square mile (0.8/km^{2}). There were 1,418 housing units at an average density of 1.2 per square mile (0.5/km^{2}). The racial makeup of the county was 98.17% White, 0.04% African American, 0.04% Native American, 0.16% Asian, 0.12% Pacific Islander, 0.20% from some other races and 1.26% from two or more races. Hispanic or Latino people of any race were 1.02% of the population. In terms of ancestry, 74.5% were German, 17.7% were Russian, 7.3% were Norwegian, 6.7% were English, and 2.5% were American.

Of the 1,025 households, 19.5% had children under the age of 18 living with them, 54.1% were married couples living together, 4.3% had a female householder with no husband present, 38.3% were non-families, and 36.3% of all households were made up of individuals. The average household size was 2.06 and the average family size was 2.66. The median age was 50.8 years.

The median income for a household in the county was $31,923 and the median income for a family was $47,500. Males had a median income of $31,953 versus $27,941 for females. The per capita income for the county was $19,255. About 12.5% of families and 16.5% of the population were below the poverty line, including 21.3% of those under age 18 and 27.1% of those age 65 or over.

== Communities ==
=== Cities ===
- Eureka
- Leola (county seat)

=== Towns ===
- Hillsview
- Long Lake
- Wetonka

=== Census-designated places ===
- Grassland Colony
- Long Lake Colony
- Spring Creek Colony

=== Unincorporated communities ===
- Greenway
- Long Lake Colony
- Madra (partial)

=== Townships ===
- Carl
- Hoffman
- Wachter
- Wacker
- Weber

== Politics ==
Except during the 1924, 1928 and 1932 elections when anti-Prohibition sentiment by the county's German Lutheran populace turned the county against Calvin Coolidge and Herbert Hoover, McPherson County has been among the most overwhelmingly Republican jurisdictions in the country. Apart from these anomalous elections, the free silver-influenced 1896 election, and the 1936 Democratic landslide in the aftermath of Prohibition, the best performance by any Democrat has been Barack Obama’s 32 percent in 2008. In 1968 and 1980 McPherson was among the five most Republican counties in the country, and in 1964 it was rivalled only by neighbouring Campbell County and the famous Republican bastions of Hooker County, Nebraska and Jackson County, Kentucky as Barry Goldwater’s best county outside the former Confederacy.

United States presidential election results for McPherson County, South Dakota
Year	Republican		Democratic		Third party(ies)	
Year	No.	%	No.	%	No.	%
1892	487	50.52%	221	22.93%	256	26.56%
1896	512	58.25%	361	41.07%	6	0.68%
1900	898	74.15%	297	24.53%	16	1.32%
1904	727	77.84%	144	15.42%	63	6.75%
1908	785	81.86%	157	16.37%	17	1.77%
1912	0	0.00%	327	32.86%	668	67.14%
1916	992	80.06%	224	18.08%	23	1.86%
1920	1,470	72.92%	112	5.56%	434	21.53%
1924	833	28.83%	94	3.25%	1,962	67.91%
1928	1,234	45.52%	1,468	54.15%	9	0.33%
1932	606	18.35%	2,650	80.25%	46	1.39%
1936	1,921	54.81%	1,556	44.39%	28	0.80%
1940	2,839	77.46%	826	22.54%	0	0.00%
1944	2,290	84.81%	410	15.19%	0	0.00%
1948	2,034	76.24%	611	22.90%	23	0.86%
1952	2,915	86.99%	436	13.01%	0	0.00%
1956	2,225	77.85%	633	22.15%	0	0.00%
1960	2,354	79.26%	616	20.74%	0	0.00%
1964	1,891	72.34%	723	27.66%	0	0.00%
1968	2,105	80.34%	389	14.85%	126	4.81%
1972	1,950	76.92%	579	22.84%	6	0.24%
1976	1,662	70.22%	693	29.28%	12	0.51%
1980	2,056	85.60%	287	11.95%	59	2.46%
1984	1,813	81.08%	418	18.69%	5	0.22%
1988	1,358	70.14%	571	29.49%	7	0.36%
1992	945	53.94%	478	27.28%	329	18.78%
1996	1,080	62.25%	463	26.69%	192	11.07%
2000	1,073	75.72%	295	20.82%	49	3.46%
2004	1,180	74.73%	369	23.37%	30	1.90%
2008	915	66.55%	441	32.07%	19	1.38%
2012	921	75.80%	272	22.39%	22	1.81%
2016	892	78.45%	192	16.89%	53	4.66%
2020	1,075	81.19%	222	16.77%	27	2.04%
2024	1,087	83.68%	188	14.47%	24	1.85%

== See also ==
- National Register of Historic Places listings in McPherson County, South Dakota
