= Duell Township, Perkins County, South Dakota =

Township in Perkins County, South Dakota

Coordinates: 45°20′18″N 102°38′56″W

Duell Township is a township in Perkins County, in the U.S. state of South Dakota. Its population was 15 as of the 2010 census.
