= Castle Butte Township, Perkins County, South Dakota =

Township in Perkins County, South Dakota

Coordinates: 45°53′25″N 102°31′1″W

Castle Butte Township is a township in Perkins County, in the U.S. state of South Dakota. Its population was 19 as of the 2010 census.
