= De Witt Township, Perkins County, South Dakota =

Township in Perkins County, South Dakota

Coordinates: 45°46′57″N 102°5′56″W

De Witt Township is a township in Perkins County, in the U.S. state of South Dakota. Its population was 42 as of the 2010 census.
