= Lone Tree Township, Merrick County, Nebraska =

Lone Tree Township
- Township
- Location in Merrick County
- Coordinates: 41°07′17″N 098°01′36″W
- Country: United States
- State: Nebraska
- County: Merrick

Area
  - Total: 66.97 sq mi (173.46 km^{2})
  - Land: 65.04 sq mi (168.45 km^{2})
  - Water: 1.93 sq mi (5.01 km^{2}) 2.89%
- Elevation: 1,710 ft (520 m)

Population (2020)
  - Total: 627
  - Density: 9.64/sq mi (3.72/km^{2})
- GNIS feature ID: 0838111

Lone Tree Township is one of eleven townships in Merrick County, Nebraska, United States. The population was 627 at the 2020 census. A 2021 estimate placed the township's population at 626.

== History ==
Lone Tree Township takes its name from a large cottonwood tree that was a local landmark on the prairie until it was toppled in a storm in 1865.

== See also ==
- County government in Nebraska
