= Lake Vermillion (South Dakota) =

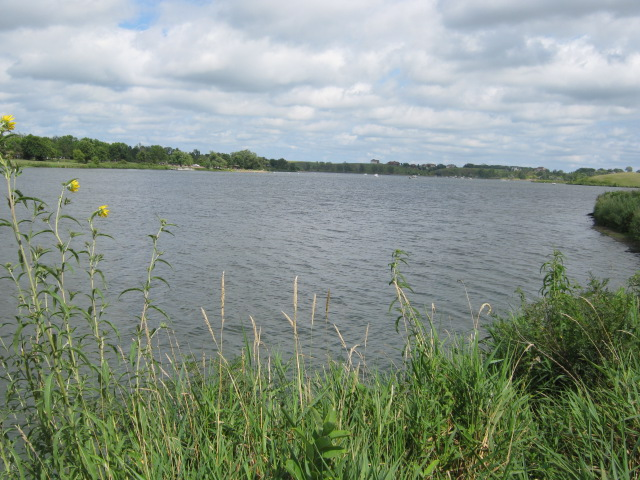
- Southwestern portion of Lake Vermillion

- Location within South Dakota Location within the United States
- Location: McCook County, South Dakota
- Coordinates: 43.607°N 97.170°W
- Type: artificial lake
- Primary inflows: East Fork of the Vermillion River
- Primary outflows: East Fork of the Vermillion River
- Basin countries: United States
- Surface area: 512 acres (207 ha)
- Max. depth: 23 ft (7.0 m)
- Surface elevation: 1,437 ft (438 m)

Lake Vermillion is an artificial lake in McCook County, South Dakota, about 6 miles (9.7 km) east of Canistota, or 8 miles (13 km) south of Montrose. The lake is formed by a dam on the East Fork of the Vermillion River. It is located within a South Dakota Recreation Area.

== History ==
The dam impounding the lake's waters was constructed in 1958. The lake is popular with swimmers, boaters, and fishermen, and is known to contain Walleye, Northern pike, Crappie, and Bluegill.
