= Beck-Highland Township, Perkins County, South Dakota =

Township in Perkins County, South Dakota

Coordinates: 45°13′56″N 102°40′5″W

Beck-Highland Township is a township in Perkins County, South Dakota, United States. Its population was 13 as of the 2010 census.
