= Ada Township, Perkins County, South Dakota =

Ada Township, South Dakota
- Township
- Location within South Dakota Location within the United States
- Coordinates: 45°20′38″N 102°24′39″W
- Country: United States
- State: South Dakota
- County: Perkins

Area
  - Total: 35.6 sq mi (92.3 km^{2})
  - Land: 35.4 sq mi (91.8 km^{2})
  - Water: 0.19 sq mi (0.5 km^{2})
- Elevation: 2,484 ft (757 m)

Population (2000)
  - Total: 23
  - Density: 0.78/sq mi (0.3/km^{2})
- Time zone: UTC-7 (Mountain (MST))
  - Summer (DST): UTC-6 (MDT)
- ZIP code: 57620
- Area code: 605
- FIPS code: 46-00220
- GNIS feature ID: 1269024

Ada (ZIP code 57644) is a rural township in Perkins County, South Dakota, with a population of 557.
