= Lake Creek Township, Pettis County, Missouri =

Inactive township in the American state of Missouri

Coordinates: 38.5781°N 93.1167°W

Lake Creek Township is an inactive township in Pettis County, in the U.S. state of Missouri.

Lake Creek Township was erected in 1872, taking its name from Lake Creek.
