= Antelope Township, Perkins County, South Dakota =

Township in Perkins County, South Dakota

Coordinates: 45°20′43″N 102°45′40″W

Antelope Township is a township in Perkins County, in the U.S. state of South Dakota. Its population was 35 as of the 2010 census.
