= Hoffman Township, McPherson County, South Dakota =

Township in McPherson County, South Dakota

Coordinates: 45.80970°N 99.03510°W

Hoffman Township is one of the five townships of McPherson County, South Dakota, United States. It lies in the northeastern part of the county and borders Wacker Township and Weber Township within McPherson County.

In 2019, the population was 24.
