= Redfield Township, Spink County, South Dakota =

Township in Spink County, South Dakota

Coordinates: 44.84331°N 98.513429°W

Redfield Township is a township in Spink County, South Dakota, USA. As of the 2000 census, its population was 358.

The township is not to be confused with the city of Redfield, which is a separate political subdivision in the county.
