= Weber Township, McPherson County, South Dakota =

Township in McPherson County, South Dakota

Coordinates: 45.8972°N 98.9069°W

Weber Township is one of the five townships of McPherson County, South Dakota, United States. It lies in the northeastern part of the county and borders Wachter Township, Carl Township, Hoffman Township, Wacker Township in McPherson County.

In 2019, the population was 155.
