= Cash Township, Perkins County, South Dakota =

Coordinates: 45.5986°N 102.6290°W

Cash Township is a township in Perkins County, South Dakota, US.

Cash Township has the name of Cassius "Cash" Timmons, a cattleman.
