= Barrett Township, Perkins County, South Dakota =

Township in Perkins County, South Dakota

Coordinates: 45°46′53″N 102°30′22″W

Barrett Township is a township in Perkins County, in the U.S. state of South Dakota. Its population was 17 as of the 2020 census.
