= Mazeppa Township, Grant County, South Dakota =

Township in Grant County, South Dakota

Coordinates: 45°11′57″N 96°58′36″W

Mazeppa Township is located in Grant County, State of South Dakota, United States. The population consists of 9 people according to the 2000 census. 47% of the inhabitants of the village of Mazeppa are of German, 11% of Irish, and the rest of Norwegian and English origin. was named in honor of Hetman Ivan Mazepa.

== History ==
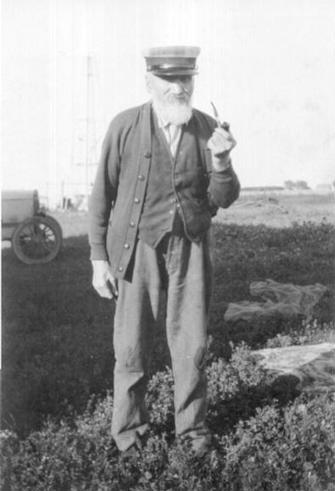
Karl Korth, considered to be the founder of the village of Mazeppa

The establishment of Mazeppa Township has been attributed to a German immigrant couple, Carl and Ernestina Korth, who set up a homestead in Grant County in 1885 after living for seven years in Canada. They seem to have been locally known as Charles and Ernestine Kors.

== Geography ==
The township has a total area of 134.075 km ². South Dakota highway number 81 is the main road for its residents.

== Population ==
As of 2000 there were 79 residents, employed in agricultural production.

Population density - 0.59 persons per square kilometer. Men - 53.16%, female - 46.84%. The racial makeup of the city - white. The age structure of population: 0–9 years - 20.25%, 10-19 - 2.53%, 20–29 years - 16.46%, 30–39 years - 16.46%, 40–49 years - 11.39%, 50–59 years - 6.33%, 60–69 years - 12.66%, the years 70-79 - 10.13%.

== Education ==
Sixteen percent of Mazeppa's residents aged 25 and older have a bachelor's degree or have graduated from college.
