= Wacker Township, McPherson County, South Dakota =

Township in McPherson, South Dakota, United States

Coordinates: 45.8972°N 99.0356°W

Wacker Township is one of the five townships of McPherson County, South Dakota, United States. It lies in the northeastern part of the county and borders Hoffman Township and Weber Township within McPherson County.

In 2019, the population was 14.
