= Chance Township, Perkins County, South Dakota =

Township in South Dakota, U.S.

Coordinates: 45°23′31″N 102°16′26″W

Chance Township is a township in Perkins County, in the U.S. state of South Dakota. Its population was 40 as of the 2010 census.
