= Usta, South Dakota =

Unincorporated community in South Dakota, U.S.

Coordinates: 45°13′13″N 102°09′47″W

Usta is an unincorporated community in Perkins County, in the U.S. state of South Dakota which lies on South Dakota Highway 73.

== History ==
Usta was laid out in 1931. A post office called Usta was established in 1931, and remained in operation until 1942.
