= Anderson Township, Perkins County, South Dakota =

Township in Perkins County, South Dakota

Coordinates: 45°41′26″N 102°15′18″W

Anderson Township is a township in Perkins County, in the U.S. state of South Dakota. Its population was 18 as of the 2010 census.
