= Carl Township, McPherson County, South Dakota =

Township in McPherson County, South Dakota

Coordinates: 45.80970°N 98.78650°W

Carl Township is one of the five townships of McPherson County, South Dakota, United States. It lies in the northeastern part of the county and borders Wachter Township and Weber Township within McPherson County.

In 2019, the population was 34.
