= Wetonka, South Dakota =

Wetonka wi-tȟáŋka
- Town
- Wetonka, South Dakota
- Location in McPherson County and the state of South Dakota
- Coordinates: 45°37′28″N 98°46′18″W
- Country: United States
- State: South Dakota
- County: McPherson
- Incorporated: 1910

Area
  - Total: 0.25 sq mi (0.64 km^{2})
  - Land: 0.25 sq mi (0.64 km^{2})
  - Water: 0 sq mi (0.00 km^{2})
- Elevation: 1,470 ft (450 m)

Population (2020)
  - Total: 16
  - Density: 65.0/sq mi (25.08/km^{2})
- Time zone: UTC-6 (Central (CST))
  - Summer (DST): UTC-5 (CDT)
- ZIP code: 57481
- Area code: 605
- FIPS code: 46-70740
- GNIS feature ID: 1267650

Wetonka (Dakota: wi-tȟáŋka; "Big Sun") is a town in McPherson County, South Dakota, United States. The population was 16 at the 2020 census.

Wetonka was laid out in 1906.

== Geography ==
According to the United States Census Bureau, the town has a total area of 0.25 square miles (0.65 km^{2}), all land.

== Demographics ==
Historical population
Census	Pop.	Note	%±
1920	164		—
1930	111		−32.3%
1940	109		−1.8%
1950	115		5.5%
1960	46		−60.0%
1970	31		−32.6%
1980	22		−29.0%
1990	12		−45.5%
2000	12		0.0%
2010	8		−33.3%
2020	16		100.0%
U.S. Decennial Census; 2013 Estimate

=== 2010 census ===
As of the census of 2010, there were 8 people, 3 households, and 3 families residing in the town. The population density was 32.0 inhabitants per square mile (12.4/km^{2}). There were 3 housing units at an average density of 12.0 per square mile (4.6/km^{2}). The racial makeup of the town was 100.0% White.

There were 3 households, of which 33.3% had children under the age of 18 living with them and 100.0% were married couples living together. 0.0% of all households were made up of individuals. The average household size was 2.67 and the average family size was 2.67.

The median age in the town was 57.5 years. 12.5% of residents were under the age of 18; 0.0% were between the ages of 18 and 24; 12.5% were from 25 to 44; 37.5% were from 45 to 64; and 37.5% were 65 years of age or older. The gender makeup of the town was 62.5% male and 37.5% female.

=== 2000 census ===
As of the census of 2000, there were 12 people, 4 households, and 4 families residing in the town. The population density was 48.8 inhabitants per square mile (18.8/km^{2}). There were 7 housing units at an average density of 28.5 per square mile (11.0/km^{2}). The racial makeup of the town was 100.00% White.

There were 4 households, out of which 25.0% had children under the age of 18 living with them, 100.0% were married couples living together, and 0.0% were non-families. No households were made up of individuals, and none had someone living alone who was 65 years of age or older. The average household size was 3.00 and the average family size was 3.00.

In the town, the population was spread out, with 16.7% under the age of 18, 25.0% from 25 to 44, 41.7% from 45 to 64, and 16.7% who were 65 years of age or older. The median age was 49 years. For every 100 females, there were 100.0 males. For every 100 females age 18 and over, there were 100.0 males.

The median income for a household in the town was $25,417, and the median income for a family was $25,417. Males had a median income of $23,750 versus $0 for females. The per capita income for the town was $13,144. None of the population or families were below the poverty line.
