= Lake Creek Township, Pennington County, South Dakota =

Township in Pennington County, South Dakota

Coordinates: 44°0′52″N 102°2′17″W

Lake Creek Township is a township in Pennington County, in the U.S. state of South Dakota. Its population was 43 as of the 2010 census.
