= Chaudoin Township, Perkins County, South Dakota =

Township in Perkins County, South Dakota

Coordinates: 45°14′58″N 102°23′2″W

Chaudoin Township is a township in Perkins County, in the U.S. state of South Dakota. Its population was 18 as of the 2010 census.
