= Montrose, South Dakota =

- City
- Motto: "What You Need When You Need It"
- Location in McCook County and the state of South Dakota
- Coordinates: 43°41′59″N 97°11′04″W
- Country: United States
- State: South Dakota
- County: McCook
- Platted: 1880

Area
  - Total: 0.42 sq mi (1.09 km^{2})
  - Land: 0.42 sq mi (1.09 km^{2})
  - Water: 0 sq mi (0.00 km^{2})
- Elevation: 1,476 ft (450 m)

Population (2020)
  - Total: 468
  - Density: 1,110/sq mi (428.7/km^{2})
- Time zone: UTC-6 (Central (CST))
  - Summer (DST): UTC-5 (CDT)
- ZIP code: 57048
- Area code: 605
- FIPS code: 46-43500
- GNIS feature ID: 1267483
- Website: http://www.cityofmontrosesd.com/

Montrose is a city in McCook County, South Dakota, United States. The population was 468 at the 2020 census.

== History ==
Montrose was laid out in 1880. Some say the town was named after the novel A Legend of Montrose by Sir Walter Scott, while others believe the name is an amalgamation of "mountain" and "rose", features near the original town site. A post office has been in operation in Montrose since 1880. Then-President George H. W. Bush visited Montrose for a political event in 1992.

== Geography ==
According to the United States Census Bureau, the city has a total area of 0.41 square miles (1.06 km^{2}), all land.

=== Climate ===
According to the Köppen Climate Classification system, Montrose has a hot-summer humid continental climate, abbreviated "Dfa" on climate maps.

Climate data for Montrose, South Dakota, 1991–2020 normals
Month	Jan	Feb	Mar	Apr	May	Jun	Jul	Aug	Sep	Oct	Nov	Dec	Year
Mean daily maximum °F (°C)	25.1 (−3.8)	30.0 (−1.1)	42.9 (6.1)	56.9 (13.8)	69.3 (20.7)	79.7 (26.5)	84.3 (29.1)	81.4 (27.4)	74.5 (23.6)	61.0 (16.1)	43.5 (6.4)	30.5 (−0.8)	56.6 (13.7)
Daily mean °F (°C)	15.7 (−9.1)	20.7 (−6.3)	32.2 (0.1)	44.4 (6.9)	57.4 (14.1)	68.2 (20.1)	73.0 (22.8)	70.1 (21.2)	61.9 (16.6)	48.5 (9.2)	32.6 (0.3)	21.0 (−6.1)	45.5 (7.5)
Mean daily minimum °F (°C)	6.3 (−14.3)	11.4 (−11.4)	21.6 (−5.8)	31.9 (−0.1)	45.4 (7.4)	56.8 (13.8)	61.7 (16.5)	58.8 (14.9)	49.3 (9.6)	35.9 (2.2)	21.8 (−5.7)	11.6 (−11.3)	34.4 (1.3)
Average precipitation inches (mm)	0.88 (22)	0.71 (18)	1.34 (34)	3.01 (76)	3.67 (93)	4.43 (113)	3.42 (87)	3.46 (88)	3.01 (76)	2.18 (55)	1.15 (29)	0.82 (21)	28.08 (712)
Average snowfall inches (cm)	5.1 (13)	6.1 (15)	3.8 (9.7)	3.6 (9.1)	0.1 (0.25)	0.0 (0.0)	0.0 (0.0)	0.0 (0.0)	0.1 (0.25)	0.8 (2.0)	3.1 (7.9)	8.3 (21)	31.0 (79)
Average precipitation days (≥ 0.01 in)	3.7	3.3	4.6	7.1	9.7	9.8	6.7	6.9	6.5	5.3	3.9	3.4	70.9
Average snowy days (≥ 0.1 in)	2.7	2.4	1.5	0.9	0.0	0.0	0.0	0.0	0.2	0.8	1.1	2.7	12.3
Source: NOAA

== Demographics ==
Historical population
Census	Pop.	Note	%±
1890	563		—
1900	375		−33.4%
1910	442		17.9%
1920	519		17.4%
1930	471		−9.2%
1940	506		7.4%
1950	448		−11.5%
1960	430		−4.0%
1970	377		−12.3%
1980	396		5.0%
1990	420		6.1%
2000	460		9.5%
2010	472		2.6%
2020	468		−0.8%
U.S. Decennial Census

=== 2020 census ===
As of the 2020 census, Montrose had a population of 468. The median age was 40.7 years. 27.8% of residents were under the age of 18 and 18.6% of residents were 65 years of age or older. For every 100 females there were 92.6 males, and for every 100 females age 18 and over there were 95.4 males age 18 and over.

0.0% of residents lived in urban areas, while 100.0% lived in rural areas.

There were 176 households in Montrose, of which 34.7% had children under the age of 18 living in them. Of all households, 56.8% were married-couple households, 13.1% were households with a male householder and no spouse or partner present, and 24.4% were households with a female householder and no spouse or partner present. About 22.7% of all households were made up of individuals and 10.8% had someone living alone who was 65 years of age or older.

There were 202 housing units, of which 12.9% were vacant. The homeowner vacancy rate was 1.4% and the rental vacancy rate was 9.1%.

Racial composition as of the 2020 census
Race	Number	Percent
White	453	96.8%
Black or African American	1	0.2%
American Indian and Alaska Native	1	0.2%
Asian	2	0.4%
Native Hawaiian and Other Pacific Islander	0	0.0%
Some other race	3	0.6%
Two or more races	8	1.7%
Hispanic or Latino (of any race)	5	1.1%

=== 2010 census ===
As of the census of 2010, there were 472 people, 191 households, and 135 families residing in the city. The population density was 1,151.2 inhabitants per square mile (444.5/km^{2}). There were 208 housing units at an average density of 507.3 per square mile (195.9/km^{2}). The racial makeup of the city was 97.7% White, 1.1% from other races, and 1.3% from two or more races. Hispanic or Latino of any race were 2.3% of the population.

There were 191 households, of which 35.1% had children under the age of 18 living with them, 59.2% were married couples living together, 8.9% had a female householder with no husband present, 2.6% had a male householder with no wife present, and 29.3% were non-families. 26.2% of all households were made up of individuals, and 14.7% had someone living alone who was 65 years of age or older. The average household size was 2.47 and the average family size was 2.99.

The median age in the city was 37.2 years. 27.8% of residents were under the age of 18; 5% were between the ages of 18 and 24; 28.2% were from 25 to 44; 22.4% were from 45 to 64; and 16.5% were 65 years of age or older. The gender makeup of the city was 46.6% male and 53.4% female.

=== 2000 census ===
As of the census of 2000, there were 460 people, 195 households, and 124 families residing in the city. The population density was 1,133.7 inhabitants per square mile (437.7/km^{2}). There were 202 housing units at an average density of 497.8 per square mile (192.2/km^{2}). The racial makeup of the city was 98.70% White, 0.87% Native American, 0.43% from other races. Hispanic or Latino of any race were 1.09% of the population.

There were 195 households, out of which 26.7% had children under the age of 18 living with them, 53.8% were married couples living together, 6.2% had a female householder with no husband present, and 35.9% were non-families. 31.3% of all households were made up of individuals, and 17.4% had someone living alone who was 65 years of age or older. The average household size was 2.36 and the average family size was 2.98.

In the city, the population was spread out, with 25.0% under the age of 18, 8.3% from 18 to 24, 28.9% from 25 to 44, 18.3% from 45 to 64, and 19.6% who were 65 years of age or older. The median age was 36 years. For every 100 females, there were 88.5 males. For every 100 females age 18 and over, there were 88.5 males.

The median income for a household in the city was $31,250, and the median income for a family was $39,583. Males had a median income of $30,385 versus $19,886 for females. The per capita income for the city was $15,233. About 3.5% of families and 11.8% of the population were below the poverty line, including 8.5% of those under age 18 and 18.9% of those age 65 or over.

== Porter Sculpture Park ==
The Porter Sculpture Park is located outside the Montrose community, not far from I-90. Inside the park there sit 50 giant metal creatures designed by welding extra metal junk together. Of these 50 there is a 60-foot-tall (18 m) longhorn, a giant pink rocking horse, and a magic dragon. It is an example of one man's view of the world.
