= Perkins County, South Dakota =

County in South Dakota, United States

- County
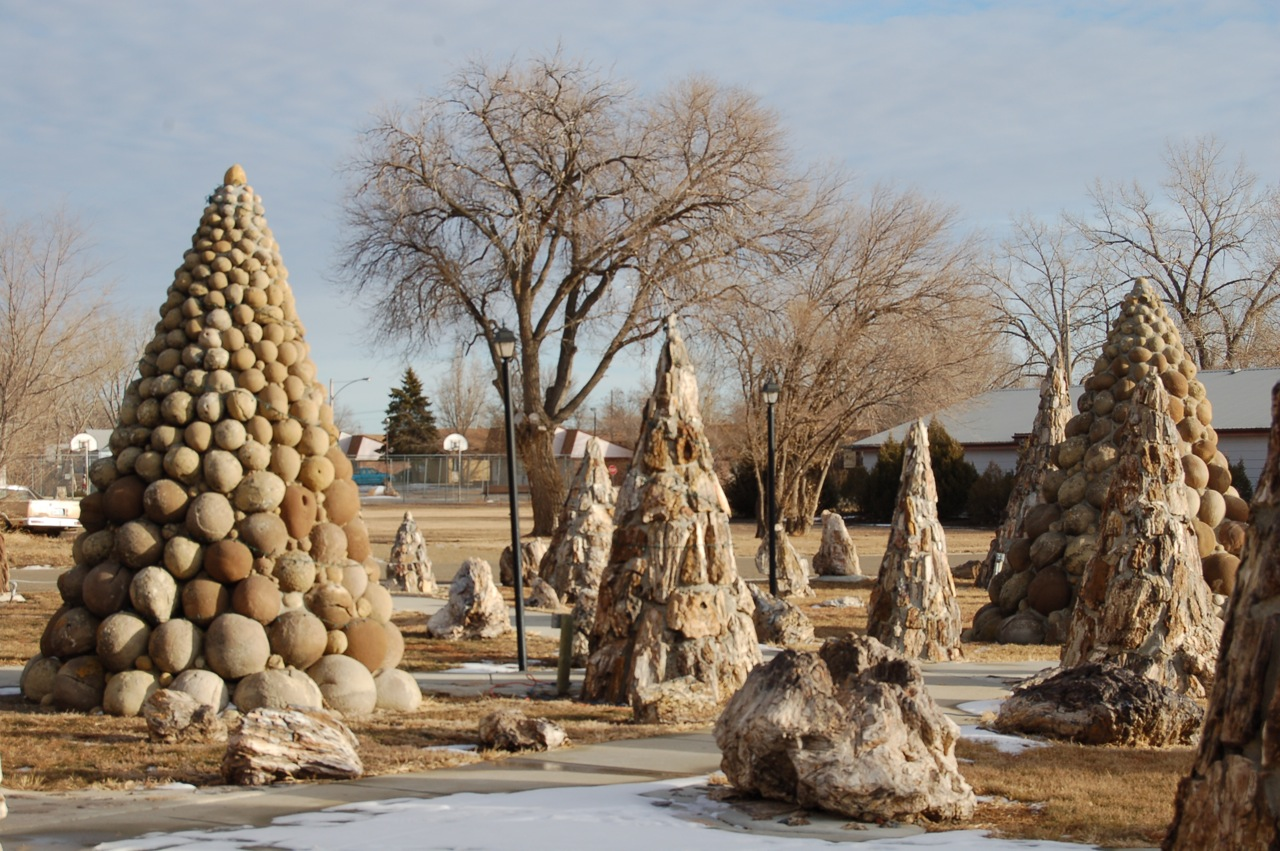
- Petrified Wood Park in Lemmon, South Dakota

- Location within the U.S. state of South Dakota
- Coordinates: 45°30′N 102°29′W
- Country: United States
- State: South Dakota
- Founded: November 3, 1908 (established); 1909 (organized)
- Named for: Henry E. Perkins
- Seat: Bison
- Largest city: Lemmon

Area
  - Total: 2,891 sq mi (7,490 km^{2})
  - Land: 2,870 sq mi (7,400 km^{2})
  - Water: 20 sq mi (52 km^{2}) 0.7%

Population (2020)
  - Total: 2,835
  - Estimate (2025): 2,853 ▲
  - Density: 0.988/sq mi (0.381/km^{2})
- Time zone: UTC−7 (Mountain)
  - Summer (DST): UTC−6 (MDT)
- Congressional district: At-large
- Website: www.perkinscounty.org

Perkins County is a county in the U.S. state of South Dakota. As of the 2020 census, the population was 2,835. Its county seat is Bison. The county was established in 1908 and organized in 1909. It was named for Sturgis, South Dakota, official Henry E. Perkins.

== Geography ==
Perkins County lies on the north edge of South Dakota. Its north boundary line abuts the south boundary line of the state of North Dakota. The Grand River flows eastward through the upper part of the county, and the Moreau River flows eastward through the lower part of the county. Shadehill Reservoir is a large impoundment on the Grand River in the county.

Perkins County terrain consists of semi-arid rolling hills, carved by drainage creeks, sparsely dedicated to agriculture. The terrain slopes to the east; its highest point is on its lower west boundary line, at 3,097 ft (944 m) ASL. The county has a total area of 2,890 square miles (7,500 km^{2}), of which 2,870 square miles (7,400 km^{2}) is land and 20 square miles (52 km^{2}) (0.7%) is water. It is the second-largest county by area in South Dakota. Meade County is the state's largest county by area.

Perkins County came to media attention in 2009 when Stephen Von Worley calculated that it was the site of the "McFarthest Spot" — the point in the continental United States that is most distant from a McDonald's restaurant: 107 miles (172 km) as the crow flies and 145 miles (233 km) by car. However, it was updated in 2010 and the spot was updated to the middle of the Nevada Desert.

=== Major highways ===
- U.S. Highway 12
- South Dakota Highway 20
- South Dakota Highway 73
- South Dakota Highway 75

=== Adjacent counties ===
- Adams County, North Dakota – north
- Corson County – east
- Ziebach County – southeast
- Meade County – south
- Butte County – southwest
- Harding County – west

=== Protected areas ===
- Grand River National Grassland (part)
- Hugh Glass State Lakeside Use Area
- Lemmon Lake State Game Production Area
- Llewellyn Johns State Recreation Area
- Owens Lake State Game Production Area
- Shadehill State Game Production Area
- Shadehill State Recreation Area
- Sorum Dam State Game Production Area
- Vobejda Dam State Game Production Area

=== Lakes ===
- Flat Creek Lake
- Lemmon Lake
- Owens Lake
- Shadehill Reservoir
- Sorum Dam
- Vobejda Dam

== Demographics ==
Historical population
Census	Pop.	Note	%±
1910	11,348		—
1920	7,993		−29.6%
1930	8,717		9.1%
1940	6,585		−24.5%
1950	6,776		2.9%
1960	5,977		−11.8%
1970	4,769		−20.2%
1980	4,700		−1.4%
1990	3,932		−16.3%
2000	3,363		−14.5%
2010	2,982		−11.3%
2020	2,835		−4.9%
2025 (est.)	2,853	▲	0.6%
U.S. Decennial Census; 1790–1960 1900–1990; 1990–2000 2010–2020

=== 2020 census ===
As of the 2020 census, there were 2,835 people, 1,257 households, and 784 families residing in the county; the population density was 1.0 inhabitant per square mile (0.39/km^{2}). Of the residents, 20.8% were under the age of 18 and 26.5% were 65 years of age or older; the median age was 47.2 years. For every 100 females there were 97.6 males, and for every 100 females age 18 and over there were 98.2 males.

The racial makeup of the county was 93.8% White, 0.1% Black or African American, 2.3% American Indian and Alaska Native, 0.2% Asian, 0.3% from some other race, and 3.2% from two or more races. Hispanic or Latino residents of any race comprised 1.3% of the population.

Of the 1,257 households in the county, 24.1% had children under the age of 18 living with them and 23.2% had a female householder with no spouse or partner present. About 33.3% of all households were made up of individuals and 16.8% had someone living alone who was 65 years of age or older.

There were 1,710 housing units, of which 26.5% were vacant. Among occupied housing units, 73.4% were owner-occupied and 26.6% were renter-occupied. The homeowner vacancy rate was 1.8% and the rental vacancy rate was 8.3%.

=== 2010 census ===
As of the 2010 census, there were 2,982 people, 1,291 households, and 838 families in the county. The population density was 1.0 inhabitant per square mile (0.39/km^{2}). There were 1,739 housing units at an average density of 0.6 units per square mile (0.23 units/km^{2}). The racial makeup of the county was 96.9% white, 1.3% American Indian, 0.1% black or African American, 0.1% Asian, 0.5% from other races, and 1.1% from two or more races. Those of Hispanic or Latino origin made up 0.7% of the population. In terms of ancestry, 47.4% were German, 26.2% were Norwegian, 10.8% were English, 8.7% were Irish, 8.4% were Swedish, and 5.8% were American.

Of the 1,291 households, 24.0% had children under the age of 18 living with them, 57.2% were married couples living together, 4.9% had a female householder with no husband present, 35.1% were non-families, and 32.0% of all households were made up of individuals. The average household size was 2.26 and the average family size was 2.85. The median age was 48.5 years.

The median income for a household in the county was $33,361 and the median income for a family was $55,313. Males had a median income of $30,255 versus $27,361 for females. The per capita income for the county was $25,780. About 11.2% of families and 18.7% of the population were below the poverty line, including 25.6% of those under age 18 and 21.2% of those age 65 or over.

== Communities ==
=== Cities ===
- Lemmon

=== Town ===
- Bison (county seat)

=== Census-designated place ===
- Prairie City

=== Unincorporated communities ===
- Chance
- Lodgepole
- Meadow
- Shadehill
- Sorum
- Summerville
- Usta
- White Butte
- Zeona

=== Ghost towns ===
- Bixby
- Brayton
- Coal Springs
- Cole
- Date
- Ellingson
- Glendo
- Imogene
- Pleasant Ridge
- Seim
- Strool
- Whitney

=== Townships ===
- Ada
- Anderson
- Antelope
- Barrett
- Beck-Highland
- Bison
- Brushy
- Burdick
- Cash
- Castle Butte
- Chance
- Chaudoin
- Clark
- De Witt
- Duell
- Englewood
- Flat Creek
- Foster
- Fredlund
- Glendo
- Grand River
- Hall
- Horse Creek
- Liberty
- Lincoln
- Lemmon
- Lodgepole
- Lone Tree
- Maltby
- Marshfield
- Martin
- Meadow
- Moreau
- Plateau
- Rainbow
- Rockford
- Scotch Cap
- Sidney
- Strool
- Trail
- Vail
- Vickers
- Viking
- Vrooman
- Wells
- White Butte
- White Hill
- Wilson
- Wyandotte

=== Unorganized territories ===
- Duck Creek
- East Perkins
- Independence
- Pleasant Valley
- South Perkins
- Southwest Perkins
- West Central Perkins
- West Perkins

== Politics ==
Like most of South Dakota, Perkins County is overwhelmingly Republican. No Democratic presidential candidate has won Perkins County since Franklin D. Roosevelt did so during his 46-state landslide in 1936. Jimmy Carter in 1976 came within 36 votes of carrying the county, but since then the only Democrat to gain even 30 percent of the county's vote has been Michael Dukakis during the drought-affected 1988 election.

United States presidential election results for Perkins County, South Dakota
Year	Republican		Democratic		Third party(ies)	
Year	No.	%	No.	%	No.	%
1912	0	0.00%	832	39.60%	1,269	60.40%
1916	890	45.41%	939	47.91%	131	6.68%
1920	1,326	60.41%	417	19.00%	452	20.59%
1924	1,421	59.21%	277	11.54%	702	29.25%
1928	2,262	68.57%	1,010	30.62%	27	0.82%
1932	1,406	40.90%	1,852	53.87%	180	5.24%
1936	1,408	41.11%	1,940	56.64%	77	2.25%
1940	1,777	57.36%	1,321	42.64%	0	0.00%
1944	1,325	57.11%	995	42.89%	0	0.00%
1948	1,424	55.04%	1,096	42.37%	67	2.59%
1952	2,160	71.78%	849	28.22%	0	0.00%
1956	1,743	59.41%	1,191	40.59%	0	0.00%
1960	1,767	60.29%	1,164	39.71%	0	0.00%
1964	1,409	52.89%	1,255	47.11%	0	0.00%
1968	1,498	60.38%	869	35.03%	114	4.59%
1972	1,691	65.09%	900	34.64%	7	0.27%
1976	1,298	50.08%	1,262	48.69%	32	1.23%
1980	1,931	72.73%	595	22.41%	129	4.86%
1984	1,686	69.93%	714	29.61%	11	0.46%
1988	1,326	60.36%	851	38.73%	20	0.91%
1992	872	43.80%	566	28.43%	553	27.77%
1996	983	58.10%	460	27.19%	249	14.72%
2000	1,237	76.64%	297	18.40%	80	4.96%
2004	1,329	73.30%	418	23.06%	66	3.64%
2008	1,102	65.36%	499	29.60%	85	5.04%
2012	1,205	75.79%	319	20.06%	66	4.15%
2016	1,333	83.00%	188	11.71%	85	5.29%
2020	1,401	83.94%	239	14.32%	29	1.74%
2024	1,342	84.35%	228	14.33%	21	1.32%

== Education ==
School districts in the county include:

- Bison School District 52-1
- Faith School District 46-2
- Lemmon School District 52-4

== See also ==
- National Register of Historic Places listings in Perkins County, South Dakota
