= Township (United States) =

Term for several types of geographic areas

A township in some states of the United States is a small geographic area.

The term is used in four ways.

1. A survey township is a geographic reference used to define property location for deeds and grants as surveyed and platted by the United States General Land Office (GLO). A survey township is nominally six by six miles square, or 23,040 acres (93.2 km^{2}).
2. A civil township is a unit of local government, generally a civil division of a county. Counties are the primary divisional entities in many states, thus the powers and organization of townships varies from state to state. Civil townships are generally given a name, sometimes written with the included abbreviation "Twp".
3. A charter township, found only in the state of Michigan, is similar to a civil township. Provided certain conditions are met, a charter township is mostly exempt from annexation to contiguous cities or villages, and carries additional rights and responsibilities of home rule.
4. A justice township, found only in the state of Nevada, is not a government. Townships in Nevada correspond only to justice courts, which handle low-level, low-value lawsuits and misdemeanors with some court functions carried out by constables. Townships can only contain one incorporated city with geographic areas larger than the city's boundaries to include unincorporated land.

== Survey townships ==
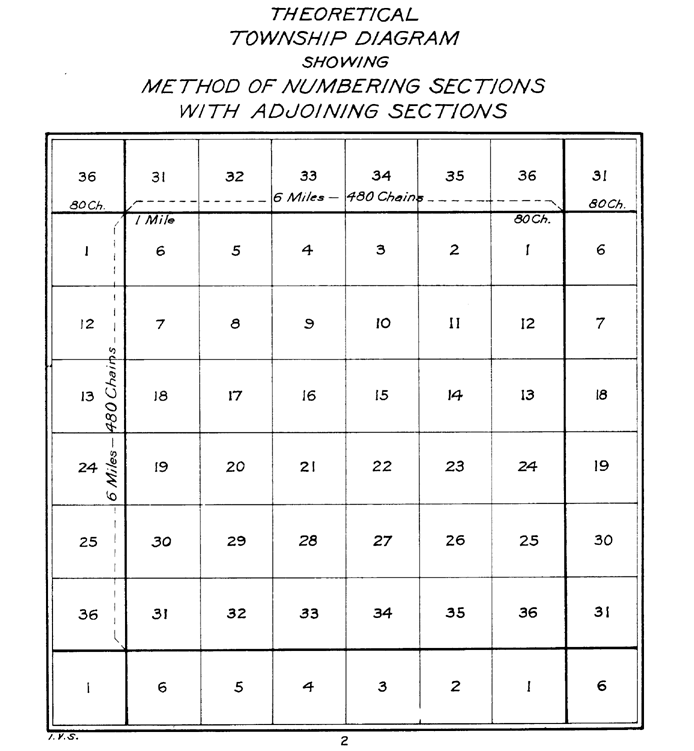
Diagram of survey township

Hierarchy of systemic numbering in the PLSS

Survey townships are generally referred to by a number based on the Public Land Survey System (PLSS). A reference to the township will look something like "Township 2 North Range 3 East", or "T2N,R3E" and such a notation is used in property descriptions based on the PLSS. Townships were originally surveyed and platted by the United States General Land Office, using contracted private survey crews, and are marked on the United States Geological Survey maps of the United States.

Townships are normally a square approximately six miles (9.7 km) on a side with cardinal boundaries conforming to meridians and parallels, containing 36 sections of one square mile (2.6 km^{2}) each. The northern and westernmost tier of sections in each township are designed to take up the convergence of the east and west township boundary lines or range lines, as well as any error in the survey measurements, and therefore these sections vary slightly from being one square mile or 640 acres (260 ha). Survey townships exist in some form in most states other than the original Thirteen Colonies, Kentucky, Tennessee, Vermont, and Maine. Irregular or fractional townships with fewer than a full 36 sections are created where full townships cannot be laid out due to existing senior boundaries, such as Spanish/Mexican ranchos, Indian reservations, state boundary lines, etc.

In Kentucky, the Jackson Purchase (the area west of the Tennessee River) is divided into townships and ranges. In Tennessee, the entire state is surveyed into townships and ranges that make up 13 survey districts of the Tennessee State Survey. In extreme northern Maine there is an area divided into townships and ranges oriented to true north. A region in the central part of the state, made up of 17 surveys, is divided into townships, but these are not oriented to true north. The remainder of the state is on metes and bounds. Similarly, Vermont and New Hampshire are mostly metes-and-bounds states, but have areas in the north that are surveyed into townships not oriented to true north. Most of Ohio is surveyed using the Public Land Survey System, but several sizable areas are metes-and-bounds, including the Virginia Military Reserve, Donation Tract, French Grant and the three Moravian grants (Gnadenhutten, Schoenbrunn and Salem). A 150,000-acre (61,000 ha) area in southern Indiana (Clark's Grant) is not surveyed into townships, but is still a gridded survey. Portions of the Texas State Survey use square townships. Sizeable portions of Alaska, Arizona, California, Idaho, Montana, Oregon and Washington are unsurveyed. Substantial swampy areas in Florida and Louisiana are also unsurveyed.

Both New York and Pennsylvania have metes-and-bounds surveys, but in the western parts of these states, the metes-and-bounds form square townships many of which are also civil townships. Besides these, nearly every state has areas of metes-and-bounds that were never included in the grids (like along major rivers) or were removed from the grid, usually due to surveying mistakes.

== Civil townships ==
The township government is a unit of local government, often rural. Townships are geographic and political subdivisions of a county. The township is identified by a name, such as Penn Township, Cumberland County, Pennsylvania. The responsibilities and the form of the township government is specified by the state legislature.

The most common form of township government has an elected board of trustees or supervisors. Some additional offices, such as clerk or constable, may also be elected. The most common governmental responsibilities of townships include oversight of such things as road maintenance, land-use planning, and trash collection. Many townships in Ohio, Michigan, New Jersey and Pennsylvania provide police and fire protection, similar to what an incorporated city would provide.

In most midwestern states, a civil township often corresponds to a single survey township, although in less populated areas, the civil township may be made up of all or portions of several survey townships. In areas where there are natural features such as a lake or river, the civil township boundaries may follow the geographic features rather than the survey township boundaries. Municipalities such as cities may incorporate or annex land in a township, which is then generally removed from township government. Only one state, Indiana, has township governments covering all its area and population. In other states, some types of municipalities, like villages, remain a part of the township while cities are not. As urban areas expand, a civil township may entirely disappear—see, for example, Mill Creek Township, Hamilton County, Ohio. In other expanding urban areas, the township may incorporate itself into a city; this can be seen in the numerous square cities of Hennepin, Anoka, and Washington counties in Minnesota. The Montgomery County, Ohio cities of Trotwood (1996, formerly Madison Township), Huber Heights (1980, Wayne Township), and Kettering (1955, Van Buren Township) are further examples of townships incorporating into cities.

Pennsylvania and New Jersey have civil townships that are not based on the PLSS survey system, but on the older metes and bounds survey system. A New Jersey township differs only in name from other municipalities: its boundaries are fixed, it is an incorporated body, and it is free to adopt another form of government. The federal government formerly had a revenue sharing arrangement that separately allocated funding for townships and other minor civil division types such as cities or boroughs; some New Jersey municipalities, such as the Township of the Borough of Verona or Township of South Orange Village, changed their names to qualify for additional federal aid at the expense of municipalities of other types.

== Charter townships ==
Michigan has created charter townships as a separate type of government to allow greater flexibility for township governments to serve urbanized populations. In Michigan, as in other states with like systems (though sometimes different names), a township is an administrative division of a county, which is an administrative division of the state. Counties and townships are local organs through which state law and public policy are administered, adapted to local need to the extent the law allows. A charter township is a township that has been granted a charter, which allows it certain rights and responsibilities of home rule that are generally intermediary in scope between those of a city (a semi-autonomous jurisdiction in Michigan) and a village, which (unless it is a home-rule village) is subject to the authority of the township(s) in which it is located.

Charter townships may also reorganize themselves into municipalities, as can be seen in Wayne County, Michigan, and elsewhere in the Detroit metropolitan area.

== Census statistics ==
Towns and townships are sometimes considered minor civil divisions of counties by the United States Census Bureau for statistical purposes. According to the Census Bureau, in 2002, town or township government applied to 16,504 organized governments in the following 20 states:

- Connecticut (towns)
- Illinois
- Indiana
- Kansas
- Maine (towns)
- Massachusetts (towns)
- Michigan
- Minnesota
- Missouri
- Nebraska
- New Hampshire (towns)
- New Jersey
- New York (towns)
- North Dakota
- Ohio
- Pennsylvania
- Rhode Island (towns)
- South Dakota
- Vermont (towns)
- Wisconsin (towns)

This categorization includes governmental units officially designated as "towns" in the New England states, New York, and Wisconsin, some plantations in Maine and locations in New Hampshire. In Minnesota, the terms town and township are used interchangeably with regard to township governments. Although towns in the six New England states and New York, and townships in New Jersey and Pennsylvania, are legally termed municipal corporations, perform municipal-type functions, and frequently serve densely populated urban areas, they have no necessary relation to concentration of population, and are thus counted for census purposes as town or township governments. Even in states beyond New England, townships often serve urbanized areas and provide municipal services typically provided by incorporated municipalities.

The count of 16,504 organized township governments does not include unorganized township areas (where the township may exist in name only, but has no organized government) or where the townships are coextensive with cities and the cities have absorbed the township functions. It also does not include the townships in Iowa (see Iowa townships), which are not separate governments, but are classified as subordinate agencies of county governments.

Of the 16,504 town or township governments, only 1,179 (7.1 percent) had as many as 10,000 inhabitants in the 2000 census and 52.4 percent of all towns or townships had fewer than 1000 inhabitants. There was a decline in the number of town or township governments from 16,629 in 1997 to 16,504 in 2002. Nearly all of the decline involved townships in the Midwest.

== Usage by state ==
Because township government is defined by each state, the use of this form also varies by state. States using a township form include the following:

- Township government is used in Indiana, Iowa, Kansas, Michigan, Missouri, Minnesota, New Jersey, North Dakota, Ohio, Pennsylvania, South Dakota and Wisconsin (in Wisconsin known as towns).
- The form is used in parts of Illinois and also in Nebraska, where they are sometimes referred to as precincts. Two cases of this use of terminology are Edwards and Wabash counties in Illinois.
- The New England states have a similar concept of local government, but combine the municipal and area government forms into a town; this is the locus of the town meeting. These states are Connecticut, Maine, Massachusetts, New Hampshire, Rhode Island and Vermont. New York also has incorporated townships, called towns, although they have fewer powers than New England towns.
  - The word "township" in Maine instead refers to sections of unorganized territories.
- Some states formerly used township governments, or have some vestige of named townships. These include Arkansas, California, Nevada, North Carolina, Oklahoma, South Carolina, Washington, and West Virginia.
