= National Register of Historic Places listings in Miner County, South Dakota =

Location of Miner County in South Dakota

This is a list of the National Register of Historic Places listings in Miner County, South Dakota.

This is intended to be a complete list of the properties on the National Register of Historic Places in Miner County, South Dakota, United States. The locations of National Register properties for which the latitude and longitude coordinates are included below, may be seen in a map.

There are 3 properties listed on the National Register in the county, and one former listing.

This National Park Service list is complete through NPS recent listings posted March 14, 2025.

== Current listings ==
	Name on the Register	Image	Date listed	Location	City or town	Description
1	Coughlin House		May 31, 2006 (#06000460)	260 W. Main St. 44°10′25″N 97°43′11″W	Carthage	
2	Nansen Store		February 25, 2014 (#14000033)	43713 228th St. 44°04′50″N 97°28′03″W	Howard	
3	South Dakota Dept. of Transportation Bridge No. 49-095-190		December 9, 1993 (#93001306)	Local road over Rock Creek; 43°55′19″N 97°39′35″W	Howard	

== Former listings ==
	Name on the Register	Image	Date listed	Date removed	Location	City or town	Description
1	Wheeler Hotel		June 19, 1985 (#85001353)	January 18, 2018	101 N. Main St. 44°00′42″N 97°31′36″W	Howard	

== See also ==
- List of National Historic Landmarks in South Dakota
- National Register of Historic Places listings in South Dakota
