= 2008 United States presidential election in South Dakota =

- November 4, 2008
- Turnout: 73.0% (of registered voters) ▼5.6 pp 63.9% (of voting age population) ▼4.3 pp

Nominee	John McCain	Barack Obama
Party	Republican	Democratic
Home state	Arizona	Illinois
Running mate	Sarah Palin	Joe Biden
Electoral vote	3	0
Popular vote	203,054	170,924
Percentage	53.16%	44.75%
County results
McCain
40–50%
50–60%
60–70%
70–80%
80–90%
Obama
40–50%
50–60%
60–70%
70–80%
80–90%
President before election
George W. Bush
Republican
Elected President
Barack Obama
Democratic

The 2008 United States presidential election in South Dakota took place on November 4, 2008, and was part of the 2008 United States presidential election. Voters chose three representatives, or electors to the Electoral College, who voted for president and vice president.

South Dakota was won by Republican nominee John McCain by an 8.4 point margin of victory. Prior to the election, 16 of 17 news organizations considered this a state McCain would win, or otherwise considered as a red state. Like the other states located in the Great Plains region, South Dakota is a predominantly rural and sparsely populated state with conservative voting tendencies which favors the Republicans, who dominate elections at the state and federal level. Although South Dakota stayed in the GOP column in 2008 as Republican John McCain carried the state with 53.16% of the popular vote, Obama greatly improved upon John Kerry's performance from four years earlier. As of the 2024 presidential election, this is the last time a Democrat won more than 40% of the vote in South Dakota, the closest a Democrat has been to winning the state since 1996, the last time the victory margin was within single digits and the last time in which Brown County, Lake County, Miner County, Minnehaha County, Moody County, and Brookings County voted for a Democratic presidential candidate. This was also the last election in which South Dakota was regarded a swing state by some outlets.

== Primaries ==
- 2008 South Dakota Republican presidential primary
- 2008 South Dakota Democratic presidential primary

== Campaign ==
=== Predictions ===
There were 16 news organizations who made state-by-state predictions of the election. Here are their last predictions before election day:

Source	Ranking
D.C. Political Report	Likely R
Cook Political Report	Toss-up
The Takeaway	Solid R
Electoral-vote.com	Lean R
Washington Post	Lean R
Politico	Solid R
RealClearPolitics	Lean R
FiveThirtyEight	Solid R
CQ Politics	Safe R
The New York Times	Solid R
CNN	Safe R
NPR	Solid R
MSNBC	Lean R
Fox News	Likely R
Associated Press	Likely R
Rasmussen Reports	Safe R

=== Polling ===
McCain won two pre-election polls, and never polled less than 47%. The highest Obama ever polled was 50%; the final poll showed McCain leading 50% to 42%.

=== Fundraising ===
John McCain raised a total of $287,533 in the state. Barack Obama raised $337,053.

=== Advertising and visits ===
Obama and his interest groups spent $639,435. McCain and his interest groups spent just $1,531. Obama did not visit the state, while McCain visited once, going to Sturgis.

== Analysis ==
South Dakota, a predominantly Republican state, has not voted for a Democratic presidential nominee since Lyndon B. Johnson won the state in the landslide election of 1964. A sparsely populated state whose population largely tends towards a rural and conservative lifestyle, the state has been won by the Republicans in every election since then, usually by wide margins.

McCain was able to keep South Dakota in the GOP column in 2008, taking in 53.16% of the total statewide vote over Obama who received 44.75%, an 8.41-percent margin of victory. This margin of victory was considerably smaller compared to 2004 when George W. Bush carried South Dakota with 59.91% of the vote over John Kerry who received 38.44%, a 21.47% margin of victory, resulting in a 13.06% swing to the Democrats in 2008.

While McCain did well throughout the state, his main strength was in Western South Dakota, where he often won by landslide margins. He was able to carry Pennington County, which contains the state's second largest city of Rapid City. In contrast, Obama ran best in Eastern South Dakota, losing most counties by fairly close margins. He also did well among Native Americans; in Western South Dakota, the only counties Obama won were majority Native American.

Obama was able to substantially improve upon John Kerry's showing in South Dakota in 2004 by a number of factors. First, it helped that South Dakota received media attention during the course of the 2008 Democratic Primary, being the last state to vote in the historic and contentious primary that gave Hillary Rodham Clinton an 11-point victory over Obama; it was Clinton's last victory in the primary. In the general election, Obama was able to cut the margin significantly by narrowly carrying Minnehaha County, which contains the state's largest city of Sioux Falls. He was also able to win Brown County, which contains Aberdeen, as well as Brookings County which contains Brookings, home of South Dakota State University. He did much better than Kerry in Eastern South Dakota, which is where most of the people live, but McCain's margins throughout the state were too large to overcome.

During the same election, incumbent Democratic U.S. Senator Tim Johnson was soundly reelected over Republican State Senator Jim Dykstra, receiving 62.49% of the vote to Dykstra's 37.51%. At the state level, Democrats made gains in the South Dakota Legislature, picking up four seats in the South Dakota House of Representatives.

== Results ==
2008 United States presidential election in South Dakota
Party	Candidate	Running mate	Votes	Percentage	Electoral votes
Republican	John McCain	Sarah Palin	203,054	53.16%	3
Democratic	Barack Obama	Joe Biden	170,924	44.75%	0
Independent	Ralph Nader	Matt Gonzalez	4,267	1.12%	0
Constitution	Chuck Baldwin	Darrell Castle	1,895	0.50%	0
Independent	Bob Barr	Wayne Allyn Root	1,835	0.48%	0
Totals			381,975	100.00%	3
Voter turnout (Voting age population)					64.7%

=== By county ===
County	John McCain Republican		Barack Obama Democratic		Various candidates Other parties		Margin		Total
County	#	%	#	%	#	%	#	%	Total
Aurora	794	53.11%	655	43.81%	46	3.08%	139	9.30%	1,495
Beadle	4,054	52.55%	3,493	45.28%	167	2.16%	561	7.27%	7,714
Bennett	614	50.83%	557	46.11%	37	3.06%	57	4.72%	1,208
Bon Homme	1,712	53.92%	1,367	43.06%	96	3.02%	345	10.87%	3,175
Brookings	6,431	46.12%	7,207	51.68%	307	2.20%	-776	-5.56%	13,945
Brown	8,067	46.29%	9,041	51.88%	318	1.82%	-974	-5.59%	17,426
Brule	1,407	57.69%	965	39.57%	67	2.75%	442	18.12%	2,439
Buffalo	156	25.20%	454	73.34%	9	1.45%	-298	-48.14%	619
Butte	2,821	66.28%	1,306	30.69%	129	3.03%	1,515	35.60%	4,256
Campbell	591	69.20%	243	28.45%	20	2.34%	348	40.75%	854
Charles Mix	2,109	53.02%	1,807	45.42%	62	1.56%	302	7.59%	3,978
Clark	1,065	54.90%	830	42.78%	45	2.32%	235	12.11%	1,940
Clay	2,296	36.78%	3,808	61.01%	138	2.21%	-1,512	-24.22%	6,242
Codington	6,374	52.31%	5,595	45.92%	216	1.77%	779	6.39%	12,185
Corson	535	38.05%	837	59.53%	34	2.42%	-302	-21.48%	1,406
Custer	2,909	64.54%	1,475	32.73%	123	2.73%	1,434	31.82%	4,507
Davison	4,731	55.96%	3,554	42.03%	170	2.01%	1,177	13.92%	8,455
Day	1,372	42.81%	1,785	55.69%	48	1.50%	-413	-12.89%	3,205
Deuel	1,088	49.05%	1,054	47.52%	76	3.43%	34	1.53%	2,218
Dewey	659	32.64%	1,328	65.78%	32	1.58%	-669	-33.14%	2,019
Douglas	1,293	73.63%	424	24.15%	39	2.22%	869	49.49%	1,756
Edmunds	1,213	58.43%	819	39.45%	44	2.12%	394	18.98%	2,076
Fall River	2,348	61.64%	1,338	35.13%	123	3.23%	1,010	26.52%	3,809
Faulk	739	62.00%	426	35.74%	27	2.27%	313	26.26%	1,192
Grant	1,951	50.94%	1,786	46.63%	93	2.43%	165	4.31%	3,830
Gregory	1,423	63.33%	771	34.31%	53	2.36%	652	29.02%	2,247
Haakon	939	81.44%	187	16.22%	27	2.34%	752	65.22%	1,153
Hamlin	1,661	59.60%	1,043	37.42%	83	2.98%	618	22.17%	2,787
Hand	1,247	62.01%	718	35.70%	46	2.29%	529	26.31%	2,011
Hanson	1,426	58.66%	961	39.53%	44	1.81%	465	19.13%	2,431
Harding	575	78.34%	135	18.39%	24	3.27%	440	59.95%	734
Hughes	5,298	62.56%	3,037	35.86%	133	1.57%	2,261	26.70%	8,468
Hutchinson	2,285	63.33%	1,242	34.42%	81	2.25%	1,043	28.91%	3,608
Hyde	547	69.68%	226	28.79%	12	1.53%	321	40.89%	785
Jackson	668	58.96%	435	38.39%	30	2.65%	233	20.56%	1,133
Jerauld	546	49.41%	542	49.05%	17	1.54%	4	0.36%	1,105
Jones	463	73.84%	147	23.44%	17	2.71%	316	50.40%	627
Kingsbury	1,435	51.54%	1,277	45.87%	72	2.59%	158	5.68%	2,784
Lake	2,993	48.61%	3,033	49.26%	131	2.13%	-40	-0.65%	6,157
Lawrence	6,787	56.30%	4,932	40.91%	336	2.79%	1,855	15.39%	12,055
Lincoln	11,803	56.84%	8,642	41.61%	322	1.55%	3,161	15.22%	20,767
Lyman	894	54.48%	710	43.27%	37	2.25%	184	11.21%	1,641
Marshall	900	41.08%	1,261	57.55%	30	1.37%	-361	-16.48%	2,191
McCook	1,646	55.89%	1,219	41.39%	80	2.72%	427	14.50%	2,945
McPherson	915	66.55%	441	32.07%	19	1.38%	474	34.47%	1,375
Meade	7,515	64.75%	3,751	32.32%	340	2.93%	3,764	32.43%	11,606
Mellette	445	52.79%	373	44.25%	25	2.97%	72	8.54%	843
Miner	577	47.37%	605	49.67%	36	2.96%	-28	-2.30%	1,218
Minnehaha	39,251	48.73%	39,838	49.46%	1,463	1.82%	-587	-0.73%	80,552
Moody	1,508	46.34%	1,663	51.11%	83	2.55%	-155	-4.76%	3,254
Pennington	27,603	59.64%	17,802	38.47%	875	1.89%	9,801	21.18%	46,280
Perkins	1,102	65.36%	499	29.60%	85	5.04%	603	35.77%	1,686
Potter	937	65.07%	482	33.47%	21	1.46%	455	31.60%	1,440
Roberts	1,781	39.26%	2,672	58.91%	83	1.83%	-891	-19.64%	4,536
Sanborn	669	55.43%	500	41.43%	38	3.15%	169	14.00%	1,207
Shannon	331	9.88%	2,971	88.69%	48	1.43%	-2,640	-78.81%	3,350
Spink	1,660	50.78%	1,550	47.42%	59	1.80%	110	3.36%	3,269
Stanley	1,017	65.49%	510	32.84%	26	1.67%	507	32.65%	1,553
Sully	581	69.75%	233	27.97%	19	2.28%	348	41.78%	833
Todd	571	20.19%	2,208	78.08%	49	1.73%	-1,637	-57.89%	2,828
Tripp	1,859	65.48%	914	32.19%	66	2.32%	945	33.29%	2,839
Turner	2,538	58.32%	1,681	38.63%	133	3.06%	857	19.69%	4,352
Union	4,310	55.97%	3,244	42.12%	147	1.91%	1,066	13.84%	7,701
Walworth	1,668	62.94%	923	34.83%	59	2.23%	745	28.11%	2,650
Yankton	5,039	49.72%	4,838	47.74%	257	2.54%	201	1.98%	10,134
Ziebach	312	35.02%	554	62.18%	25	2.81%	-242	-27.16%	891
Totals	203,054	53.16%	170,924	44.75%	7,997	2.09%	32,130	8.41%	381,975

Counties that flipped from Republican to Democratic

- Brookings (largest city: Brookings)
- Brown (largest city: Aberdeen)
- Lake (largest city: Madison)
- Marshall (largest city: Britton)
- Miner (largest city: Howard)
- Minnehaha (largest city: Sioux Falls)
- Moody (largest city: Flandreau)

=== By congressional district ===
South Dakota has only one congressional district because of its small population compared to other states. This district, called the at-large district because it covers the entire state, is equivalent to the statewide election results.

District	McCain	Obama	Representative
At-large	53.2%	44.8%	Stephanie Herseth Sandlin

== Electors ==
Technically the voters of South Dakota cast their ballots for electors, representatives to the Electoral College. The state is allocated three electors because it has one congressional district and 2 senators. All candidates who appear on the ballot or qualify to receive write-in votes must submit a list of three electors, who pledge to vote for their candidate and the candidate's running mate. In the state's First Past the Post (plurality voting) system, the winner of a plurality of votes in the state is awarded all three electoral votes. Their chosen electors then vote for president and vice president. Although electors are pledged to their candidate and running mate, they are not obligated to vote for them. An elector who votes for someone other than his or her candidate is known as a faithless elector.

The electors of each state and the District of Columbia met on December 15, 2008, to cast their votes for president and vice president. The Electoral College itself never meets as one body. Instead the electors from each state and the District of Columbia met in their respective capitals.

The following were the members of the Electoral College from the state. All 3 were pledged to John McCain and Sarah Palin:

1. Mike Rounds
2. Dennis Daugaard
3. Larry Long

== See also ==
- Presidency of Barack Obama
- United States presidential elections in South Dakota
