= Tornado outbreak of August 28, 1884 =

1884 weather events in Dakota Territory

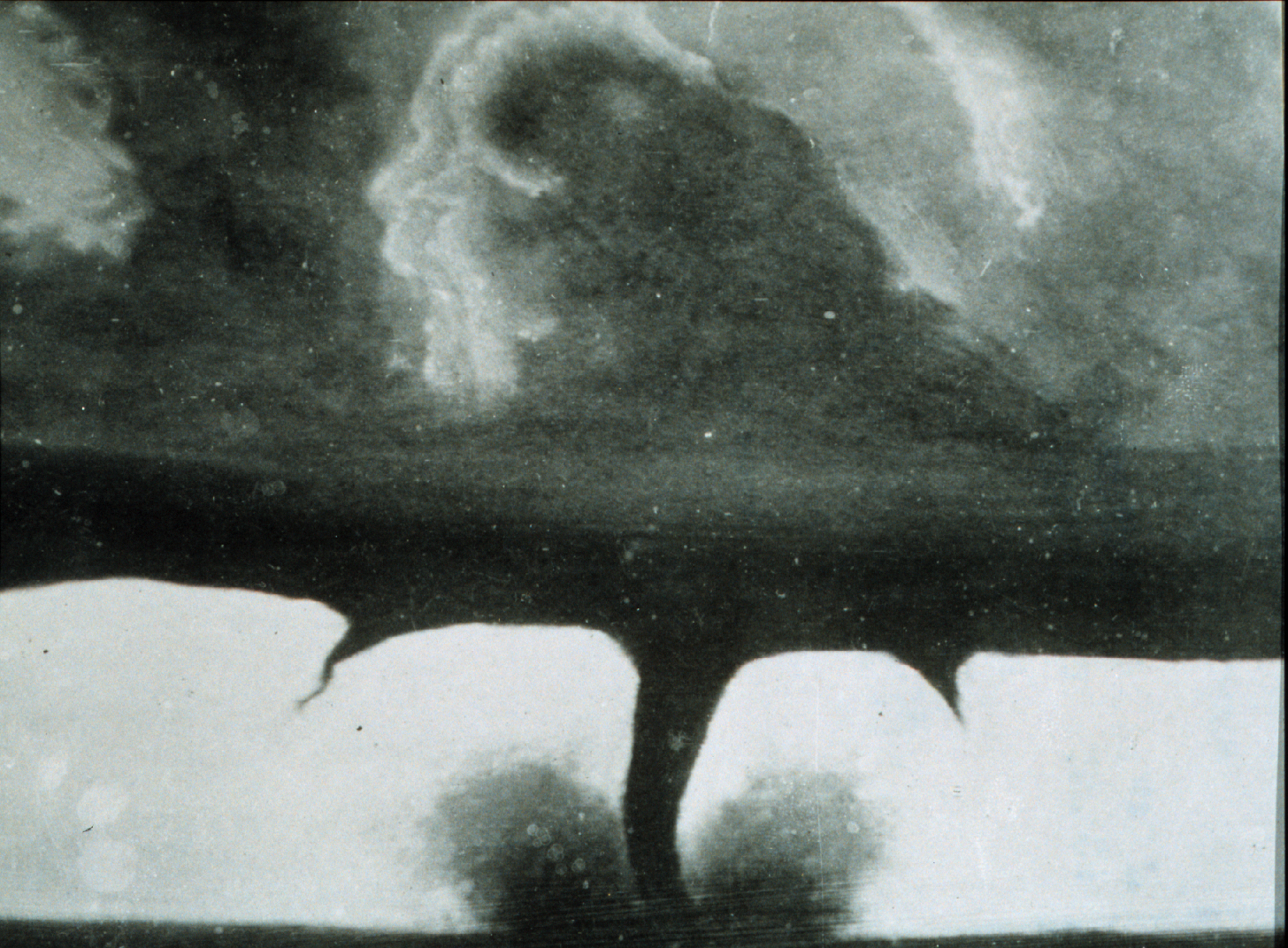
- An F4 tornado that occurred near Howard, South Dakota.

Meteorological history
- Date: August 28, 1884
- Duration: ~3 1/2 hours

Tornado outbreak
- Tornadoes: ≥ 6
- Max. rating: F4 tornado

Overall effects
- Casualties: ≥ 7 fatalities, ≥ 2 injuries
- Damage: (Note: All losses are in 1884 USD unless otherwise noted.)
- Areas affected: Dakota Territory

On August 28, 1884, a tornado outbreak, including a family of at least five strong tornadoes, affected portions of the Dakota Territory within present-day South Dakota. Among them was one of the first known tornadoes to have been photographed, an estimated F4 on the Fujita scale, that occurred near Howard and exhibited multiple vortices. Another violent tornado also occurred near Alexandria, and three other tornadoes were also reported. A sixth tornado also occurred in present-day Davison County. In all, the tornadoes killed at least seven people and injured at least two others. Contemporary records and survivors' recollections indicate that the storms were F3 or F4 intensity on the Fujita scale, but cannot currently be officially verified, as official records begin in 1950, nearly 70 years after this outbreak. (Note: An outbreak is generally defined as a group of at least six tornadoes (the number sometimes varies slightly according to local climatology) with no more than a six-hour gap between individual tornadoes. An outbreak sequence, prior to (after) the start of modern records in 1950, is defined as a period of no more than two (one) consecutive days without at least one significant (F2 or stronger) tornado.) (Note: The Fujita scale was devised under the aegis of scientist T. Theodore Fujita in the early 1970s. Prior to the advent of the scale in 1971, tornadoes in the United States were officially unrated. While the Fujita scale has been superseded by the Enhanced Fujita scale in the U.S. since February 1, 2007, Canada utilized the old scale until April 1, 2013; nations elsewhere, like the United Kingdom, apply other classifications such as the TORRO scale.) (Note: Historically, the number of tornadoes globally and in the United States was and is likely underrepresented: research by Grazulis on annual tornado activity suggests that, as of 2001, only 53% of yearly U.S. tornadoes were officially recorded. Documentation of tornadoes outside the United States was historically less exhaustive, owing to the lack of monitors in many nations and, in some cases, to internal political controls on public information. Most countries only recorded tornadoes that produced severe damage or loss of life. Significant low biases in U.S. tornado counts likely occurred through the early 1990s, when advanced NEXRAD was first installed and the National Weather Service began comprehensively verifying tornado occurrences.)

== Confirmed tornadoes ==
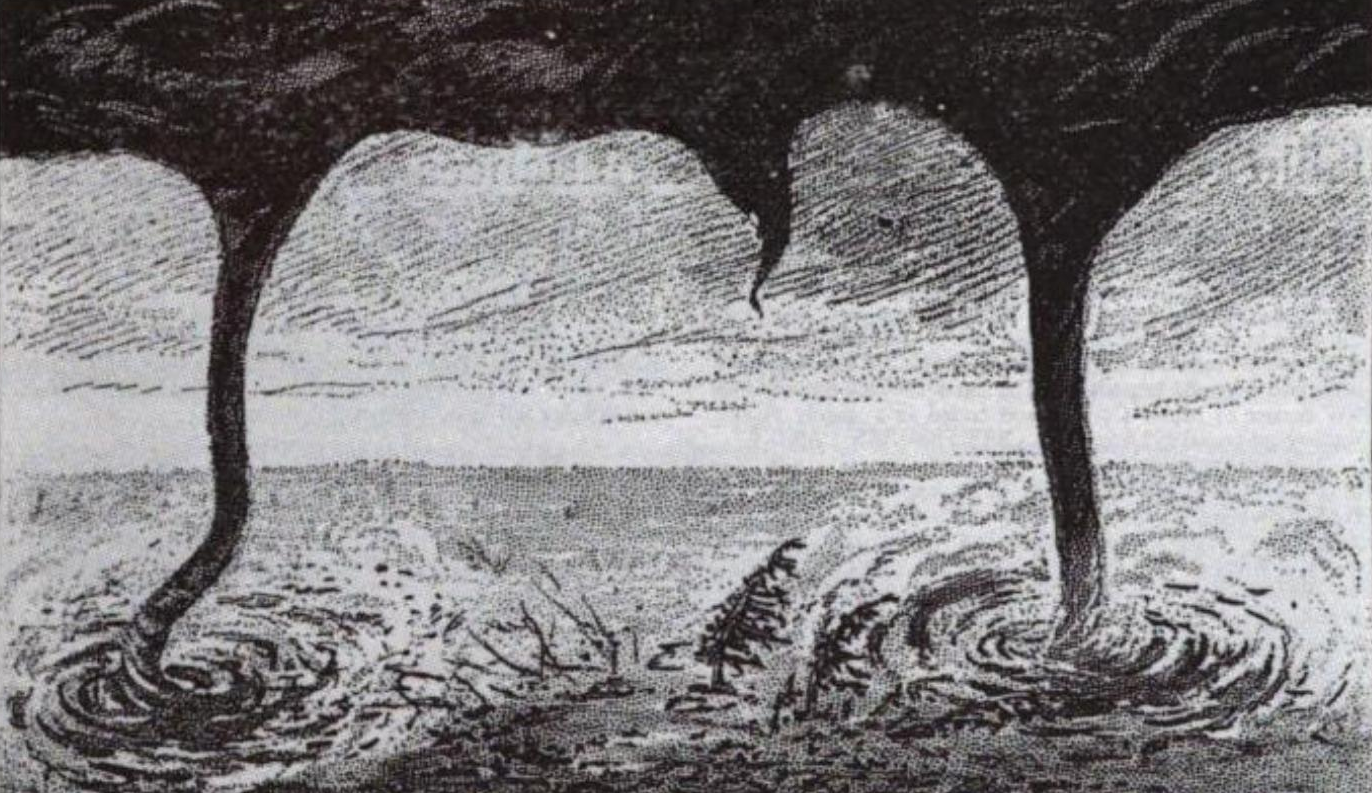
A sketch of tornadoes over Hanson County, South Dakota. Multiple tornadoes are depicted.

Confirmed tornadoes by Fujita rating
FU	F0	F1	F2	F3	F4	F5	Total
≥ 1	?	?	2	1	2	0	≥ 6

=== August 28 event ===
Confirmed tornadoes – August 28, 1884 (Note: All dates are based on the local time zone where the tornado touched down; however, all times are in Coordinated Universal Time and dates are split at midnight CST/CDT for consistency.) (Note: Prior to 1994, only the average widths of tornado paths were officially listed.)
F#	Location	County / Parish	State	Time (UTC)	Path length	Max. width	Summary
F2	Carthage to W of Howard	Miner	SD	20:00–?	20 miles (32 km)	Unknown	This was the first of five tornadoes to form from a supercell that tracked across portions of five counties in present-day South Dakota. Tornado destroyed a farmhouse and a barn, killing up to 30 cattle nearby. One person may have died.
F3	E of Huron	Beadle, Sanborn	SD	21:15–?	20 miles (32 km)	100 yards (91 m)	1 death – Tornado destroyed six or more barns and farmhouses. One person was injured.
F4	NNW of Forestburg to W of Howard to Long Lake	Sanborn, Miner, Hanson	SD	22:00–?	30 miles (48 km)	400 yards (370 m)	1 death – See article on this tornado
F4	Alexandria to S of Bridgewater	Hanson, Hutchinson	SD	22:30–?	25 miles (40 km)	600 yards (550 m)	4 deaths – Tornado demolished one farm, located south of Bridgewater. All fatalities occurred there. One person was found 1/2 mi (0.80 km) away.
F2	W of Sioux Falls	Minnehaha	SD	23:30–?	5 miles (8.0 km)	80 yards (73 m)	1 death – Tornado affected three farmsteads, one of which it destroyed, along with barns on the other farmsteads.
FU	Mitchell	Davison	SD	Unknown	Unknown	Unknown	Tornado reported.

== Howard, South Dakota ==
Howard, South Dakota
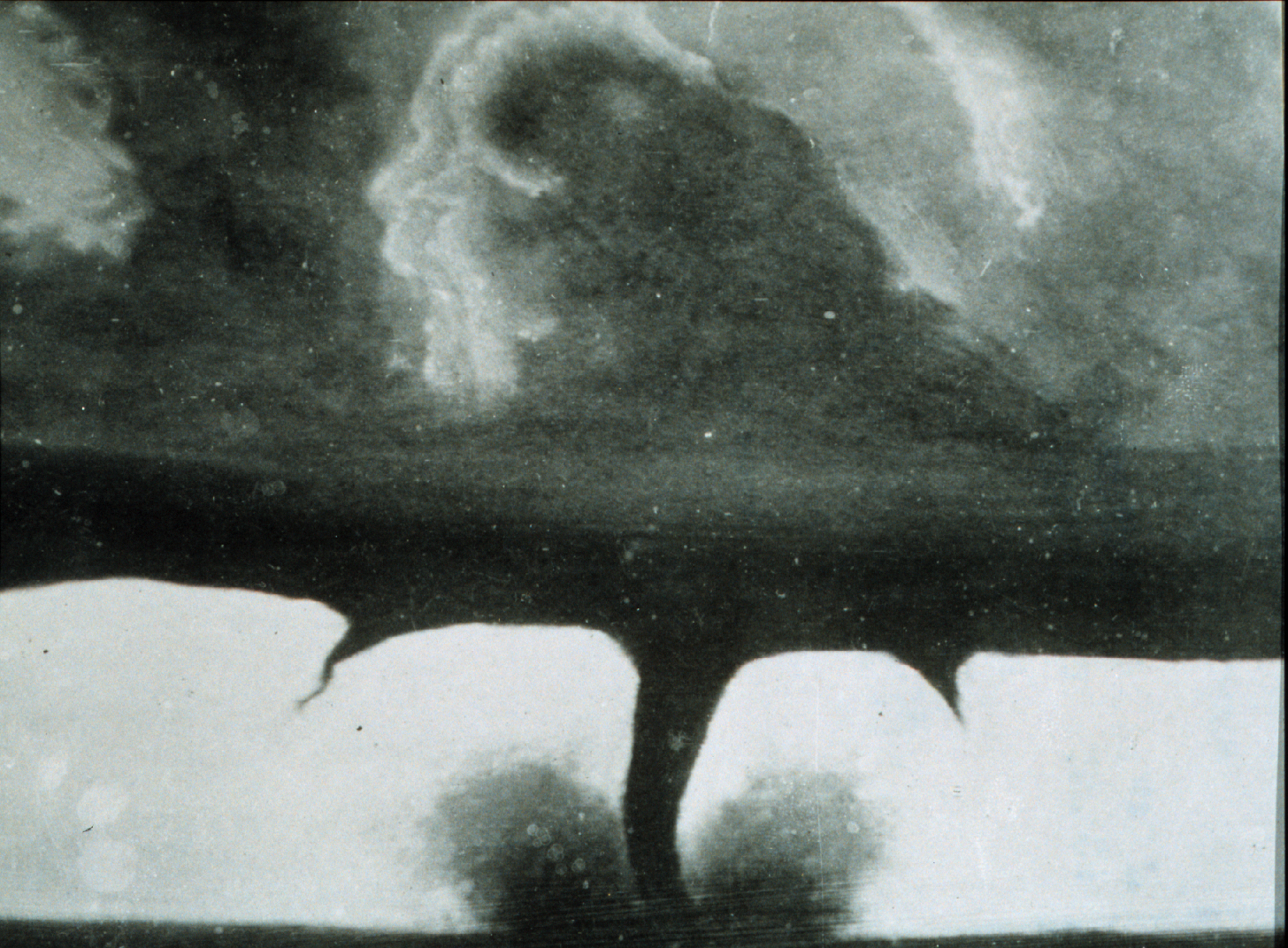
- An alleged photograph of the tornado, widely considered as the first ever tornado photo.

Meteorological history
- Formed: August 28, 1884, 5:00 p.m. CDT (UTC−05:00)
- Dissipated: August 28, 1884, 7:00 pm. CDT (UTC−05:00)
- Duration: 2 hours

F4 tornado
- on the Fujita scale
- Highest winds: 207–260 mph (333–418 km/h)

This was one of the first tornadoes of which there is a photograph. The photographer was F. N. Robinson, who observed the tornado from a street in the town of Howard, about 3 km (1.9 mi) east of the storm track. There was also another photographer from Huron who took multiple photographs of the same tornado an hour earlier. However, they were lost or destroyed during the engraving process. Tornado obliterated a home near Forestburg and killed at least 30 cattle. One person was injured. Two or more tornadoes may have been involved., during the afternoon and evening hours of Thursday, August 28, 1884, an F4 tornado would hit the city of Howard, South Dakota. this tornado is notable for being one of the first tornadoes to have a photograph taken of it by F. N. Robinson. There was likely another photographer from Huron who took multiple photographs of the same tornado an hour prior. However, they were lost or destroyed during the engraving process. the tornado would kill one person and injure another over an approximate 30 mile path

it was estimated that the tornado was first spotted at about 5:00 PM CDT and was likely on the ground for at least 2 hours. it would also hit a house, completely obliterating it, killing 30 cattle in the process.

== See also ==
- List of North American tornadoes and tornado outbreaks
- List of notable media in the field of meteorology

== Sources ==
- Grazulis, Thomas P. (July 1993). Significant Tornadoes 1680–1991: A Chronology and Analysis of Events. St. Johnsbury, Vermont: The Tornado Project of Environmental Films. ISBN 1-879362-03-1.
- Grazulis, Thomas P. (2001a). The Tornado: Nature's Ultimate Windstorm. Norman: University of Oklahoma Press. ISBN 978-0-8061-3538-0.
- Grazulis, Thomas P. (2001b). F5-F6 Tornadoes. St. Johnsbury, Vermont: The Tornado Project of Environmental Films.
