= 1884 Garnett tornado =

1884 tornado in Eastern Kansas

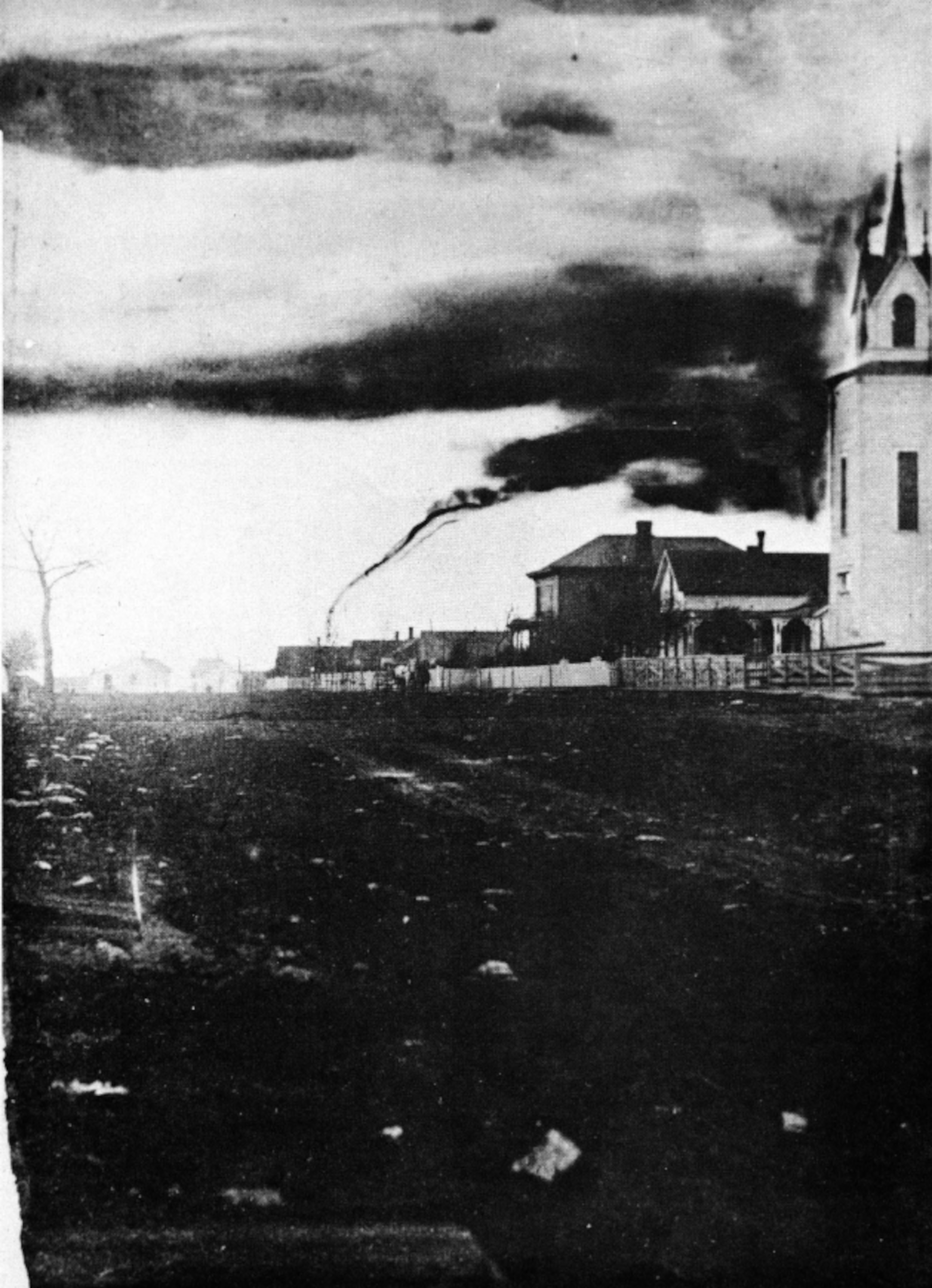
- A. A. Adams' photograph of the tornado, as it passed by Garnett

Meteorological history
- Formed: April 26, 1884; 5:30 p.m. CDT (UTC–05:00)
- Dissipated: Unknown
- Duration: Unknown

F1 tornado
- on the Fujita scale

Overall effects
- Casualties: 1 (Note: At least one individual was in some way affected by the tornado. There are conflicting reports on whether this man was injured or killed.)
- Areas affected: Coffey and Anderson Counties, Kansas
- Part of the Tornadoes of 1884

During the afternoon of April 26, 1884, a long-lived tornado affected portions of Coffey and Anderson Counties, in the U.S. state of Kansas. Tornado historian Thomas P. Grazulis estimates this tornado at F1 intensity on the Fujita Scale, reporting that one man was killed when he was thrown from his wagon, though other sources report that this man was injured, not killed. As of present, A. A. Adams' photograph of the tornado as it passed near Garnett is considered to be the oldest in history.

== Meteorological synopsis ==
On the morning of April 26, 1884, a low-pressure system was observed over Western Kansas moving gradually northeastward, with an accompanying trough surrounding the area of low pressure. Shear vectors followed the direction of the trough. An area of high pressure overspread the Southeastern United States, extending from Florida to Kentucky. Leavenworth, Kansas, the closest station to Garnett at the time, reported a barometric decrease of -0.17 inHg in the past 8 hours, as a result of the approaching low. For the Missouri Valley, the forecasted weather was light rainfall, party cloudy weather, and "variable winds shifting to the north and west".

The synoptic conditions that contributed to the formation of the Garnett tornado, observed on the morning of April 26, 1884.

== Overview ==
=== Tornado summary ===
An illustration of A. A. Adams' photograph of the Garnett tornado, as seen in the April 16, 1893 issue of the Syracuse Sunday Herald. The Garnett tornado is marked "1".

The Garnett tornado touched down in eastern Coffey County at 5:30 p.m. local time, approximately 38 km (24 mi) to the west-southwest of Garnett. The tornado moved relatively slowly, producing a damage path around 15 km (9.3 mi) long in at least 30 minutes. (Note: This represents the duration for which the tornado was visible from Garnett, from 5:30 p.m. to 6:00 p.m. The tornado could have been on the ground before becoming visible from Garnett.) The tornado was described as being of moderate intensity and appearing as "a long rope of a purplish colored cloud" throughout its life. The width of the tornado's core varied between 6.2 m (6.8 yd) and 13 m (14 yd), according to a reporter of the Anderson County Republican, who surveyed the tornado track on horseback; minor damage to outbuildings and other structures was observed "out to a few hundred meters" from the core. Modest property damage was noted closer to the tornado's core. About 3 mi (4.8 km) north of Westphalia, the tornado struck a wagon laden with wood. The lumber was scattered for a scattered for a mile, and the driver and horses pulling the wagon were carried into the air. The Garnett tornado eventually died out in northwestern Anderson County, near what is now Harris.

=== A. A. Adams' photograph ===
As the tornado passed by Garnett, an estimated 22.5 km (14.0 mi) away from town, a fruit farmer and professional photographer by the name of A. A. Adams quickly assembled his box camera and captured a single photo of the tornado; this photograph is, as of present, thought to be the first ever taken of a tornado. The photo itself was taken from a downtown street in Garnett, at a corner near the United Presbyterian Church. The original image was supposedly on a 10 x 12 cm glass plate. Adams, seeing the promise and profitability of his photograph, sold many copies of this image, marketing souvenir cards and stereographs showing his picture. A surviving version of the photograph in the Kansas State Historical Society archives shows a "retouching" or "doctoring" of the funnel cloud, which was not uncommon at the time. However, the photo is otherwise completely authentic.

== Aftermath ==
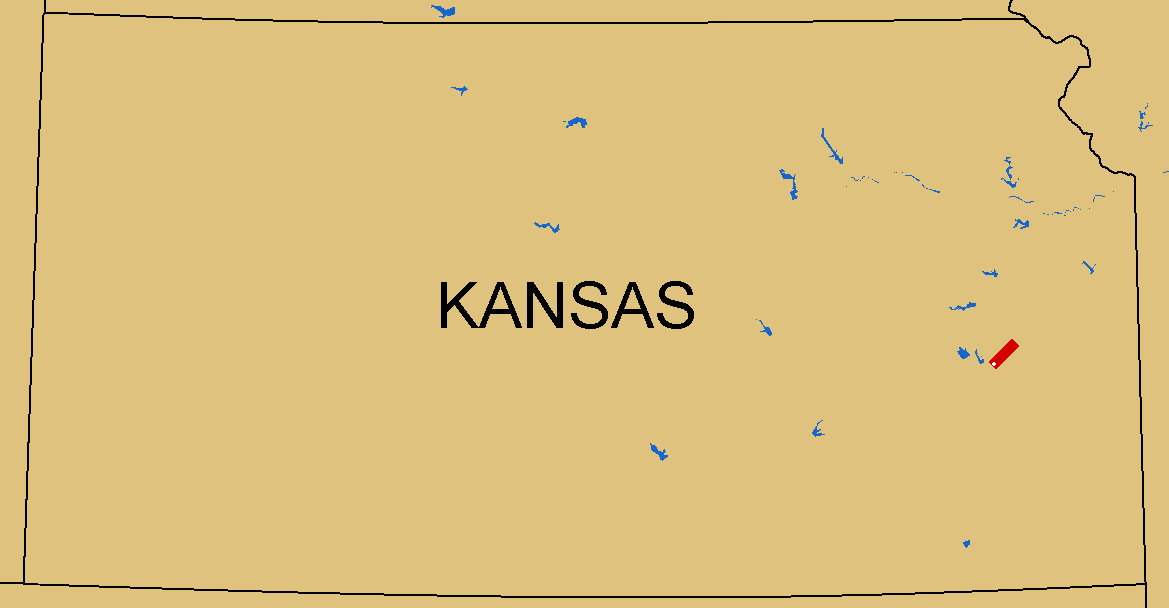
A map of the Garnett tornado's path, relative to the state of Kansas

Property damage caused by the Garnett tornado was mild, though the tornado did cause one casualty as it was occluding near Westphalia. A man by the name of David Metheney was driving a horse-drawn wagon when the tornado struck, lofting him, his horses, and scattering the lumber contained in the back of the wagon across a mile of open prairie. Though tornado historian Thomas P. Grazulis reports that Metheney was killed, several other sources, including the Kansas State Historical Society, report that Metheney survived with numerous internal injuries. The Garnett tornado quickly garnered notability for being one of the earliest tornadoes to be photographed, though it is only in recent times that it has actually been confirmed (or reasonably believed) to be the first ever photographed. The title for the "first ever photographed" was originally attributed to F. N. Robinson's photograph of a tornado near Howard, South Dakota in August of the same year. This photo, too, was "doctored" by its creator.

== See also ==
- Enigma tornado outbreak — An extremely fatal tornado outbreak that took place in the Southeastern United States, during the same year as the Garnett tornado
- 1884 Howard tornado — A tornado of estimated F4 intensity in 1884, which was originally thought to be the oldest photographed tornado
- 1957 Ruskin Heights tornado — A long-track and highly fatal F5 tornado that occurred to the north of Garnett in Franklin County, 73 years later
- List of meteorological photos and videos
