= 1884 Howard tornado =

1884 F4 tornado in the Dakota Territory

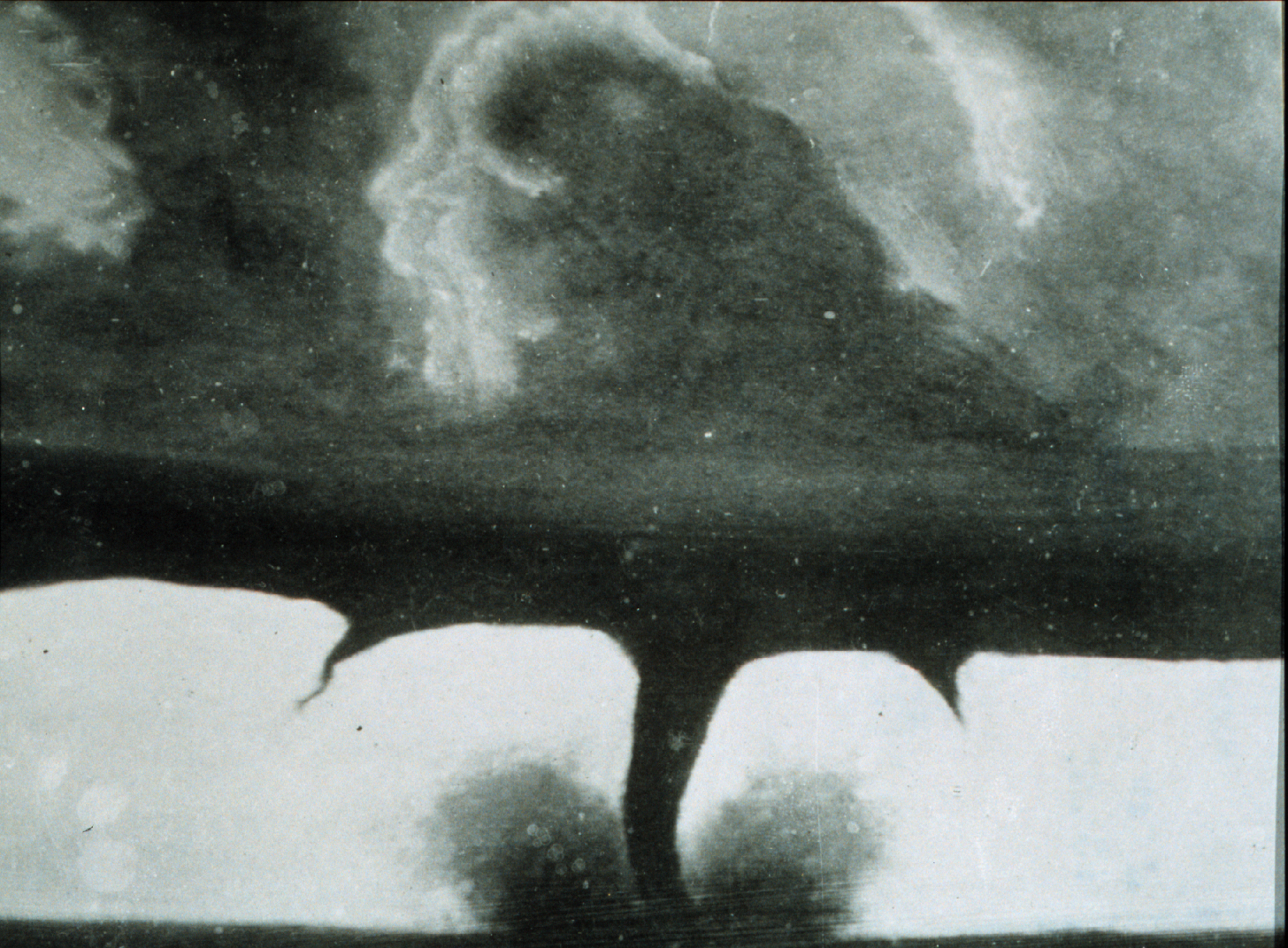
- One of the earliest known photographs of a tornado. An earlier photograph was taken near Garnett, Kansas, on April 26, 1884.

Meteorological history
- Formed: August 28, 1884, before 4:00 p.m. local time
- Dissipated: August 28, 1884, after 6:00 p.m. local time
- Duration: more than 2 hours

Overall effects
- Fatalities: 1
- Injuries: 1
- Damage: unknown
- Areas affected: North-northwest of Forestburg, west of Howard, to Long Lake, Dakota Territory, in present-day South Dakota

F4 tornado
- on the Fujita scale
- Max width: 400 yards (0.23 mi; 0.37 km)
- Path length: 30 miles (48 km)
- Part of the Tornado outbreak of August 28, 1884 and Tornadoes of 1884

During the afternoon and evening hours of Thursday, August 28, 1884, an F4 tornado passed west of Howard, South Dakota, then part of the Dakota Territory. The storm was part of a larger tornado outbreak that produced several strong to violent tornadoes across southeastern portions of the Dakota Territory and caused multiple fatalities. The Howard tornado is notable as one of the earliest tornadoes to be photographed, by F. N. Robinson. The tornado traveled approximately 30 miles (48 km), killing one person and injuring another.

== Tornado summary ==
The tornado was first observed at about 4:00 p.m. local time, moving southeastward, and remained visible for more than two hours. A contemporary account placed it about 22 miles (35 km) west of Howard at that time. The tornado moved southeastward through the area west of Howard, where it was photographed by F. N. Robinson. It destroyed a house along its path and killed approximately 30 cattle. The tornado continued toward Long Lake before dissipating. In total, the tornado killed one person and injured at least one other.

== Legacy ==
This was one of the earliest tornadoes to be photographed. The photographer was F. N. Robinson, who observed the tornado from a street in the town of Howard, about 3 km (1.9 mi) east of the storm track.

== See also ==
- 1884 Garnett tornado – Another early tornado photograph, taken on April 26, 1884
- List of North American tornadoes and tornado outbreaks
- List of notable media in the field of meteorology
