= Nansen Store =

- U.S. National Register of Historic Places
- Location within South Dakota Location within the United States
- Location: 43713 228th St., Howard, South Dakota
- Coordinates: 44°4′50″N 97°28′3″W
- Area: less than one acre
- Built: 1903
- NRHP reference No.: 14000033
- Added to NRHP: February 25, 2014

The Nansen Store is an historic retail building at 43713 228th Street in rural Miner County, South Dakota, roughly 8 miles northeast of Howard. The store is a 2 1/2-story wood-frame structure, with a smaller 1 1/2-story structure attached. Although it is uncertain when the first structure was built, a store was on the site in 1903, with what was described as an addition (24' x 32') in 1910, and the building presently standing was fully described in a 1937 mortgage. The larger section has a full-width front porch with a hip roof, and a center entry flanked by large four-pane display windows. The smaller section is to the left of the larger one, also with a gable front. It was originally a Homestead home, probably built about 1890, since the patent for the land was 1889. The first documented operator of the store was Knut Skaar, a Norwegian immigrant.

The building was listed on the National Register of Historic Places in 2014.
