= Cloverleaf Colony, South Dakota =

- Census-designated place
- Location within South Dakota Location within the United States
- Coordinates: 44°11′02″N 97°32′18″W
- Country: United States
- State: South Dakota
- County: Miner

Area
  - Total: 0.093 sq mi (0.24 km^{2})
  - Land: 0.093 sq mi (0.24 km^{2})
  - Water: 0 sq mi (0.00 km^{2})
- Elevation: 1,634 ft (498 m)

Population (2020)
  - Total: 16
  - Density: 172.3/sq mi (66.52/km^{2})
- Time zone: UTC-6 (Central (CST))
  - Summer (DST): UTC-5 (CDT)
- ZIP Code: 57349 (Howard)
- Area code: 605
- FIPS code: 46-13010
- GNIS feature ID: 2813053

Cloverleaf Colony is a census-designated place (CDP) and former Hutterite colony in Miner County, South Dakota, United States. It was first listed as a CDP prior to the 2020 census. The population of the CDP was 16 at the 2020 census.

It is near the northern edge of the county, 12 miles (19 km) north of Howard, the county seat, and 15 miles (24 km) south of De Smet.

== Demographics ==
Historical population
Census	Pop.	Note	%±
2020	16		—
U.S. Decennial Census
