= Twin Lakes, South Dakota =

Twin Lakes is a game production area located in Roswell Township, Miner County, South Dakota.
