= Massive double-funnel tornado near Dunlap, Indiana =

1965 photograph

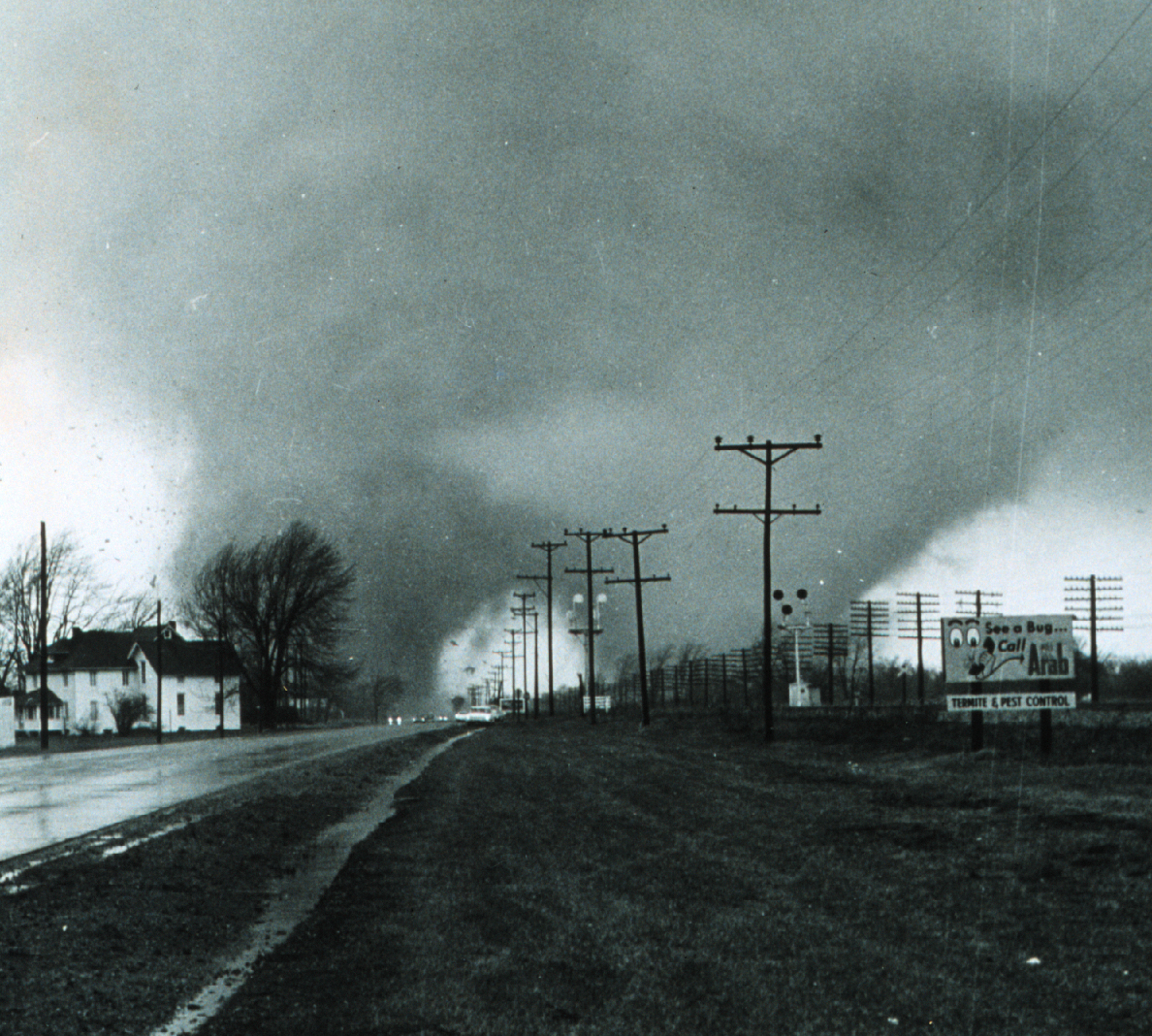
- Artist: Paul Huffman
- Year: 1965
- Type: Photograph
- Subject: 1965 Palm Sunday tornado outbreak

Massive double-funnel tornado near Dunlap, Indiana is a 1965 black-and-white photograph of a multi-vortex tornado in Elkhart, Indiana during the 1965 Palm Sunday tornado outbreak. The photograph, taken by Paul Huffman for The Elkhart Truth, was described as "one of the most famous tornado photographs ever taken".

== Background ==
On April 11, 1965, photographer Paul Huffman was driving back to his Dunlap, Indiana residence on U.S. Route 33 with his wife, Betty Huffman, and stopped his vehicle as he saw the tornado approach. He told Betty to take cover if the tornado came close to their location before getting out of the car and anchoring his leg around the vehicle to keep himself steady. He took six photographs of the tornado with a 35 mm camera, one of which showed the tornado's multiple-vortex structure, appearing to have split in two.

== Legacy and awards ==
The image has been used in several publications since 1965. It was used on the cover of The 1965 Palm Sunday tornadoes in Indiana by Janis Thornton. The Indianapolis Star described the image as "one of the most the iconic weather photographs of the century".

== See also ==
- List of notable media in the field of meteorology
- List of photographs considered the most important
