= Wheeler Hotel =

- Formerly listed on the U.S. National Register of Historic Places
- Location within South Dakota Location within the United States
- Location: 101 N. Main St., Howard, South Dakota
- Coordinates: 44°0′42″N 97°31′36″W
- Area: less than one acre
- Built: 1880
- Architectural style: L-shape
- NRHP reference No.: 85001353

Significant dates
- Added to NRHP: June 19, 1985
- Removed from NRHP: January 18, 2018

The Wheeler Hotel was a historic hotel building at 101 North Main Street in Howard, South Dakota. It is a two-story L-shaped wood-frame structure, built c. 1880 and enlarged about ten years later. The roof line has extended eaves, which are decorated with wooden brackets, and the building sports a neon "Hotel" sign. The building served as a hotel and community center for many years, but was converted to apartments in the 1950s, following a major fire which destroyed the addition. Despite this, much of the interior decoration, particularly of the lobby space, has survived.

The building was listed on the National Register of Historic Places in 1985, and was delisted in 2018.
