= 2004 United States presidential election in South Dakota =

- November 2, 2004
- Turnout: 78.6% (of registered voters) ▲10.2 pp 68.2% (of voting age population) ▲10.1 pp

Nominee	George W. Bush	John Kerry
Party	Republican	Democratic
Home state	Texas	Massachusetts
Running mate	Dick Cheney	John Edwards
Electoral vote	3	0
Popular vote	232,584	149,244
Percentage	59.91%	38.44%
County results
Bush
50–60%
60–70%
70–80%
80–90%
Kerry
50–60%
60–70%
70–80%
80–90%
President before election
George W. Bush
Republican
Elected President
George W. Bush
Republican

The 2004 United States presidential election in South Dakota took place on November 2, 2004, and was part of the 2004 United States presidential election. Voters chose three representatives, or electors to the Electoral College, who voted for president and vice president.

South Dakota was won by incumbent President George W. Bush by a 21.5 point margin of victory. Prior to the election, all 12 news organizations considered this a state Bush would win, or otherwise considered as a safe red state. Starting in 1940, the state has voted for the Republican nominee in every presidential election, except 1964.

== Primaries ==
- 2004 South Dakota Democratic presidential primary

== Campaign ==
=== Predictions ===
There were twelve news organizations who made state-by-state predictions of the election. Here are their last predictions before election day.

Source	Ranking
D.C. Political Report	Solid R
Cook Political Report	Solid R
Research 2000	Solid R
Zogby International	Likely R
Washington Post	Likely R
Washington Dispatch	Likely R
Washington Times	Solid R
The New York Times	Solid R
CNN	Likely R
Newsweek	Solid R
Associated Press	Solid R
Rasmussen Reports	Likely R

=== Polling ===
Bush won every pre-election by a double-digit margin. The final three poll average showed Bush with 55% to Kerry at 39 percent

=== Fundraising ===
Bush raised $399,805. Kerry raised $71,553.

=== Advertising and visits ===
Neither campaign advertised or visited this state during the fall campaign season.

== Analysis ==
South Dakota politics are generally dominated by the Republican Party, and the state has not supported a Democratic presidential candidate since 1964 — even George McGovern, the Democratic nominee in 1972 and himself a South Dakotan, did not carry the state. Additionally, a Democrat has not won the governorship since 1978. As of 2006, Republicans held a ten percent voter registration advantage over Democrats and hold majorities in both the state House of Representatives and Senate.

Despite the state's general Republican and conservative leanings, Democrats have found success in various statewide elections, most notably in those involving South Dakota's congressional representatives in Washington. Two of the three members of the state's congressional delegation at the time were Democrats, and Senator Tom Daschle was the Senate minority leader (and briefly its majority leader during Democratic control of the Senate in 2001–02).

Opposition to the Iraq War in this isolationist state did allow Kerry to improve upon Al Gore’s performance in 2000 by two percentage points. Kerry's gains may also be attributed to Daschle's efforts to get Native American votes during his narrow defeat to John Thune in the concurrent Senate election. As a result, Kerry won four counties – Corson, Day, Roberts and Ziebach – that Gore had not carried in 2000.

To date, this is the last election in which Ziebach County voted for the national losing candidate.

== Results ==
Presidential Candidate	Running Mate	Party	Electoral Vote (EV)	Popular Vote (PV)	
George W. Bush (incumbent)	Richard Cheney (incumbent)	Republican	3	232,584	59.91%
John Kerry	John Edwards	Democrat	0	149,244	38.44%
Ralph Nader	Peter Camejo	Independent	0	4,320	1.11%
Michael Peroutka	Chuck Baldwin	Constitution	0	1,103	0.28%
Michael Badnarik	Richard Campagna	Libertarian	0	964	0.25%

=== Results by county ===
County	George W. Bush Republican		John Kerry Democratic		Ralph Nader Independent		Michael Peroutka Constitution		Michael J. Badnarik Libertarian		Margin		Total votes cast
County	#	%	#	%	#	%	#	%	#	%	#	%	Total votes cast
Aurora	1,009	61.19%	620	37.60%	15	0.91%	4	0.24%	1	0.06%	389	23.59%	1,649
Beadle	4,917	57.98%	3,443	40.60%	77	0.91%	19	0.22%	24	0.28%	1,474	17.38%	8,480
Bennett	833	51.10%	759	46.56%	16	0.98%	11	0.67%	11	0.67%	74	4.54%	1,630
Bon Homme	2,063	60.53%	1,293	37.94%	36	1.06%	5	0.15%	11	0.32%	770	22.59%	3,408
Brookings	7,662	57.29%	5,443	40.70%	190	1.42%	31	0.23%	49	0.37%	2,219	16.59%	13,375
Brown	10,386	55.84%	7,943	42.71%	197	1.06%	34	0.18%	39	0.21%	2,443	13.13%	18,599
Brule	1,544	58.73%	1,040	39.56%	30	1.14%	9	0.34%	6	0.23%	504	19.17%	2,629
Buffalo	223	26.52%	603	71.70%	10	1.19%	2	0.24%	3	0.36%	-380	-45.18%	841
Butte	3,166	74.13%	1,009	23.62%	45	1.05%	35	0.82%	16	0.37%	2,157	50.51%	4,271
Campbell	708	73.83%	239	24.92%	4	0.42%	7	0.73%	1	0.10%	469	48.91%	959
Charles Mix	2,556	53.27%	2,155	44.91%	73	1.52%	5	0.10%	9	0.19%	401	8.36%	4,798
Clark	1,435	61.67%	875	37.60%	11	0.47%	5	0.21%	1	0.04%	560	24.07%	2,327
Clay	2,692	43.87%	3,315	54.03%	95	1.55%	9	0.15%	25	0.41%	-623	-10.16%	6,136
Codington	7,778	61.00%	4,803	37.67%	135	1.06%	19	0.15%	16	0.13%	2,975	23.33%	12,751
Corson	720	41.76%	972	56.38%	14	0.81%	12	0.70%	6	0.35%	-252	-14.62%	1,724
Custer	2,922	67.89%	1,272	29.55%	58	1.35%	36	0.84%	16	0.37%	1,650	38.34%	4,304
Davison	5,561	62.12%	3,263	36.45%	94	1.05%	18	0.20%	16	0.18%	2,298	25.67%	8,952
Day	1,671	47.20%	1,817	51.33%	32	0.90%	5	0.14%	15	0.42%	-146	-4.13%	3,540
Deuel	1,406	58.29%	961	39.84%	25	1.04%	8	0.33%	12	0.50%	445	18.45%	2,412
Dewey	921	35.92%	1,606	62.64%	26	1.01%	8	0.31%	3	0.12%	-685	-26.72%	2,564
Douglas	1,596	79.32%	393	19.53%	14	0.70%	5	0.25%	4	0.20%	1,203	59.79%	2,012
Edmunds	1,434	64.19%	765	34.24%	19	0.85%	12	0.54%	4	0.18%	669	29.95%	2,234
Fall River	2,413	62.76%	1,326	34.49%	67	1.74%	23	0.60%	16	0.42%	1,087	28.27%	3,845
Faulk	945	69.03%	418	30.53%	5	0.37%	1	0.07%	0	0.00%	527	38.50%	1,369
Grant	2,392	58.48%	1,633	39.93%	43	1.05%	12	0.29%	10	0.24%	759	18.55%	4,090
Gregory	1,685	66.18%	813	31.93%	36	1.41%	6	0.24%	6	0.24%	872	34.25%	2,546
Haakon	1,007	81.21%	219	17.66%	7	0.56%	6	0.48%	1	0.08%	788	63.55%	1,240
Hamlin	1,946	64.63%	1,015	33.71%	37	1.23%	7	0.23%	6	0.20%	931	30.92%	3,011
Hand	1,482	67.76%	668	30.54%	29	1.33%	4	0.18%	4	0.18%	814	37.22%	2,187
Hanson	1,379	64.14%	745	34.65%	23	1.07%	2	0.09%	1	0.05%	634	29.49%	2,150
Harding	704	86.38%	94	11.53%	13	1.60%	3	0.37%	1	0.12%	610	74.85%	815
Hughes	6,017	68.10%	2,697	30.53%	76	0.86%	22	0.25%	23	0.26%	3,320	37.57%	8,835
Hutchinson	2,899	69.91%	1,177	28.38%	49	1.18%	8	0.19%	14	0.34%	1,722	41.53%	4,147
Hyde	631	70.11%	259	28.78%	6	0.67%	2	0.22%	2	0.22%	372	41.33%	900
Jackson	726	57.12%	508	39.97%	21	1.65%	11	0.87%	5	0.39%	218	17.15%	1,271
Jerauld	736	59.55%	482	39.00%	13	1.05%	3	0.24%	2	0.16%	254	20.55%	1,236
Jones	565	78.80%	134	18.69%	11	1.53%	2	0.28%	5	0.70%	431	60.11%	717
Kingsbury	1,804	59.85%	1,163	38.59%	34	1.13%	4	0.13%	9	0.30%	641	21.26%	3,014
Lake	3,359	55.92%	2,509	41.77%	108	1.80%	12	0.20%	19	0.32%	850	14.15%	6,007
Lawrence	7,489	64.45%	3,857	33.20%	176	1.51%	46	0.40%	51	0.44%	3,632	31.25%	11,619
Lincoln	11,161	65.40%	5,703	33.42%	141	0.83%	32	0.19%	29	0.17%	5,458	31.98%	17,066
Lyman	1,029	53.04%	872	44.95%	21	1.08%	12	0.62%	6	0.31%	157	8.09%	1,940
Marshall	1,242	52.54%	1,099	46.49%	14	0.59%	3	0.13%	6	0.25%	143	6.05%	2,364
McCook	2,017	61.66%	1,201	36.72%	38	1.16%	9	0.28%	6	0.18%	816	24.94%	3,271
McPherson	1,180	74.73%	369	23.37%	18	1.14%	7	0.44%	5	0.32%	811	51.36%	1,579
Meade	8,347	72.56%	2,941	25.57%	117	1.02%	77	0.67%	22	0.19%	5,406	46.99%	11,504
Mellette	553	59.40%	361	38.78%	10	1.07%	5	0.54%	2	0.21%	192	20.62%	931
Miner	810	55.10%	641	43.61%	13	0.88%	5	0.34%	1	0.07%	169	11.49%	1,470
Minnehaha	44,189	56.92%	32,314	41.62%	804	1.04%	171	0.22%	154	0.20%	11,875	15.30%	77,632
Moody	1,790	51.87%	1,609	46.62%	36	1.04%	10	0.29%	6	0.17%	181	5.25%	3,451
Pennington	29,976	66.66%	14,213	31.61%	541	1.20%	102	0.23%	136	0.30%	15,763	35.05%	44,968
Perkins	1,329	73.30%	418	23.06%	25	1.38%	34	1.88%	7	0.39%	911	50.24%	1,813
Potter	1,143	70.64%	463	28.62%	9	0.56%	2	0.12%	1	0.06%	680	42.02%	1,618
Roberts	2,396	48.09%	2,527	50.72%	49	0.98%	4	0.08%	6	0.12%	-131	-2.63%	4,982
Sanborn	817	57.29%	581	40.74%	19	1.33%	3	0.21%	6	0.42%	236	16.55%	1,426
Shannon	526	12.48%	3,566	84.62%	70	1.66%	41	0.97%	11	0.26%	-3,040	-72.14%	4,214
Spink	2,259	59.86%	1,478	39.16%	27	0.72%	5	0.13%	5	0.13%	781	20.70%	3,774
Stanley	1,129	69.56%	464	28.59%	20	1.23%	4	0.25%	6	0.37%	665	40.97%	1,623
Sully	702	76.55%	201	21.92%	12	1.31%	2	0.22%	0	0.00%	501	54.63%	917
Todd	889	25.23%	2,543	72.16%	46	1.31%	32	0.91%	14	0.40%	-1,654	-46.93%	3,524
Tripp	2,230	68.72%	972	29.95%	29	0.89%	10	0.31%	4	0.12%	1,258	38.77%	3,245
Turner	3,084	63.80%	1,646	34.05%	82	1.70%	13	0.27%	9	0.19%	1,438	29.75%	4,834
Union	3,987	56.57%	3,000	42.57%	43	0.61%	6	0.09%	12	0.17%	987	14.00%	7,048
Walworth	1,967	68.30%	878	30.49%	20	0.69%	12	0.42%	3	0.10%	1,089	37.81%	2,880
Yankton	6,003	57.55%	4,237	40.62%	129	1.24%	27	0.26%	35	0.34%	1,766	16.93%	10,431
Ziebach	447	40.05%	641	57.44%	17	1.52%	7	0.63%	4	0.36%	-194	-17.39%	1,116
Totals	232,584	59.91%	149,244	38.44%	4,320	1.11%	1,103	0.28%	964	0.25%	83,340	21.47%	388,215

==== Counties that flipped from Republican to Democratic ====
- Corson (Largest city: McLaughlin)
- Day (Largest city: Webster)
- Roberts (Largest city: Sisseton)
- Ziebach (Largest city: Dupree)

=== By congressional district ===
Due to the state's small population, only one congressional district is allocated. This district, called the at-large district, because it covers the entire state, and thus is equivalent to the statewide election results.

District	Bush	Kerry	Representative
At-large	59.9%	38.4%	Stephanie Herseth Sandlin

== Electors ==
Technically the voters of SD cast their ballots for electors: representatives to the Electoral College. SD is allocated 3 electors because it has 1 congressional district and 2 senators. All candidates who appear on the ballot or qualify to receive write-in votes must submit a list of 3 electors, who pledge to vote for their candidate and his or her running mate. Whoever wins the majority of votes in the state is awarded all 3 electoral votes. Their chosen electors then vote for president and vice president. Although electors are pledged to their candidate and running mate, they are not obligated to vote for them. An elector who votes for someone other than his or her candidate is known as a faithless elector.

The electors of each state and the District of Columbia met on December 13, 2004, to cast their votes for president and vice president. The Electoral College itself never meets as one body. Instead the electors from each state and the District of Columbia met in their respective capitols.

The following were the members of the Electoral College from the state. All 3 were pledged for Bush/Cheney.

1. Dennis Daugaard
2. Larry Long
3. Mike Rounds

== See also ==
- Presidency of George W. Bush
- United States presidential elections in South Dakota
