= Cobb family staggering out of Briarwood Elementary School =

2013 photograph

- Artist: Paul Hellstern
- Year: 2013
- Type: Photograph
- Subject: 2013 Moore tornado

Cobb family staggering out of Briarwood Elementary School is a 2013 photograph of Steve Cobb carrying his nine-year-old daughter, Jordan, and his wife LaDonna, covered in blood, holding the hand of a second child rescued from Briarwood Elementary School, which was completely destroyed by the 2013 Moore tornado with winds near 210 miles per hour (340 km/h). The iconic photograph, taken by Paul Hellstern, a photographer for The Oklahoman and Associated Press, was featured on the front cover of newspapers and news sites across the world. This photograph won Photo of the Year for The Oklahoman in 2013.

== See also ==
- List of notable media in the field of meteorology
