= Roswell, South Dakota =

- Census-designated place
- Location in Miner County and the state of South Dakota
- Coordinates: 44°0′22″N 97°41′51″W
- Country: United States
- State: South Dakota
- County: Miner
- Incorporated: 1883
- Disincorporated: 2012

Area
  - Total: 0.41 sq mi (1.05 km^{2})
  - Land: 0.41 sq mi (1.05 km^{2})
  - Water: 0 sq mi (0.00 km^{2})
- Elevation: 1,398 ft (426 m)

Population (2020)
  - Total: 8
  - Density: 19.6/sq mi (7.58/km^{2})
- Time zone: UTC-6 (Central (CST))
  - Summer (DST): UTC-5 (CDT)
- ZIP code: 57349
- Area code: 605
- FIPS code: 46-56420
- GNIS feature ID: 2761337

Roswell is a CDP in Miner County, South Dakota, United States. The population was 8 at the 2020 census. It disincorporated as a town in 2012.

Roswell was laid out in 1883, and named in honor of Roswell Miller, a railroad official.

== Geography ==
According to the United States Census Bureau, the town has a total area of 1.41 square miles (3.65 km^{2}), all land.

== Demographics ==
Historical population
Census	Pop.	Note	%±
2020	8		—
U.S. Decennial Census

=== 2010 census ===
As of the census of 2010, there were 15 people, 9 households, and 4 families residing in the town. The population density was 10.6 inhabitants per square mile (4.1/km^{2}). There were 11 housing units at an average density of 7.8 per square mile (3.0/km^{2}). The racial makeup of the town was 100.0% White.

There were 9 households, of which 11.1% had children under the age of 18 living with them, 33.3% were married couples living together, 11.1% had a female householder with no husband present, and 55.6% were non-families. 55.6% of all households were made up of individuals, and 33.3% had someone living alone who was 65 years of age or older. The average household size was 1.67 and the average family size was 2.50.

The median age in the town was 57.3 years. 13.3% of residents were under the age of 18; 6.7% were between the ages of 18 and 24; 13.4% were from 25 to 44; 33.4% were from 45 to 64; and 33.3% were 65 years of age or older. The gender makeup of the town was 46.7% male and 53.3% female.

=== 2000 census ===
As of the census of 2000, there were 21 people, 12 households, and 5 families residing in the town. The population density was 14.9 people per square mile (5.8/km^{2}). There were 12 housing units at an average density of 8.5 per square mile (3.3/km^{2}). The racial makeup of the town was 100.00% White.

There were 12 households, out of which 16.7% had children under the age of 18 living with them, 41.7% were married couples living together, none had a female householder with no husband present, and 58.3% were non-families. 58.3% of all households were made up of individuals, and 25.0% had someone living alone who was 65 years of age or older. The average household size was 1.75 and the average family size was 2.80.

In the town, the population was spread out, with 19.0% under the age of 18, none from 18 to 24, 19.0% from 25 to 44, 28.6% from 45 to 64, and 33.3% who were 65 years of age or older. The median age was 48 years. For every 10 females there were 11 males. For every 100 females age 18 and over, there were 112.5 males.

The median income for a household in the town was $6,750, and the median income for a family was $51,250. Males had a median income of $38,750 versus $0 for females. The per capita income for the town was $11,429. None of the families and 33.3% of the population were below the poverty line. Out of the total people living in poverty all of those 65 and older were living below the poverty line.
