= Fedora, South Dakota =

Fedora
- Unincorporated community
- Location within the state of South Dakota Fedora (the United States)
- Coordinates: 44°00′24″N 97°47′22″W
- Country: United States
- State: South Dakota
- County: Miner

Area
  - Total: 3.36 sq mi (8.70 km^{2})
  - Land: 3.36 sq mi (8.70 km^{2})
  - Water: 0 sq mi (0.00 km^{2})
- Elevation: 1,358 ft (414 m)

Population (2020)
  - Total: 26
  - Density: 7.7/sq mi (2.99/km^{2})
- Time zone: UTC-6 (Central (CST))
  - Summer (DST): UTC-5 (CDT)
- ZIP codes: 57337
- Area code: 605
- FIPS code: 46-21340
- GNIS feature ID: 2628845

Fedora is an unincorporated community in Miner County, South Dakota, United States, founded in 1881. As of the 2020 census, Fedora had a population of 26. Fedora has been assigned the ZIP code of 57337.

== History ==
The town of Fedora was originally platted in 1881. Fedora was originally called Miner Center, until the name was changed in 1896 due to the fact that there were several towns called Miner or Miner Center in South Dakota. According to tradition, Fedora was so named on account of the fedora hats sold by a pioneer merchant.

On June 13, 1943, two B-17 bombers from the 393rd Bomb Group of the Sioux City Army Air Base collided while on a training exercise over Fedora. One of the planes crashed immediately, and the other made a controlled landing in a creek bed several miles away. Eleven airmen were killed.

== Demographics ==
The Census Bureau began tracking Fedora as part of a CDP which bears its name, in 2010. The population of the CDP was 26 at the 2020 census.

Historical population
Census	Pop.	Note	%±
2020	26		—
U.S. Decennial Census
