= Miner County, South Dakota =

County in South Dakota, United States

- County
- Location within the U.S. state of South Dakota
- Coordinates: 44°01′17.548″N 97°36′29.239″W
- Country: United States
- State: South Dakota
- Created: 1873
- Organized: 1880
- Named for: Nelson Miner and Ephriam Miner
- Seat: Howard
- Largest city: Howard

Area
  - Total: 572 sq mi (1,480 km^{2})
  - Land: 570 sq mi (1,500 km^{2})
  - Water: 1.6 sq mi (4.1 km^{2}) 0.3%

Population (2020)
  - Total: 2,298
  - Estimate (2025): 2,281 ▼
  - Density: 4/sq mi (1.5/km^{2})
- Time zone: UTC−6 (Central)
  - Summer (DST): UTC−5 (CDT)
- Congressional district: At-large
- Website: miner.sdcounty.gov

Miner County is a county in the U.S. state of South Dakota. As of the 2020 census, the population was 2,298. Its county seat is Howard. The county was created in 1873 and organized in 1880.

== History ==
The area is situated on the site of Dakota Sioux trails that connected two sites of cultural significance to the Dakota people, the pipestone quarries in southwestern Minnesota and the Sioux Crossing of the Three Rivers, near present-day Fort Thompson. South Dakota Highway 34 now roughly follows this route.

The Fort Ridgely and South Pass Wagon Road, also known as Nobles Trail, the first road in Dakota Territory, passed through the area. It was made in 1857, connecting Fort Ridgley, Minnesota with South Pass in Wyoming Territory, along the Oregon Trail. The Minnesota and Powder River Road of 1865 also passed through the county.

The boundaries of present-day Miner County experienced several changes during territorial times. The county was established in 1873 by the Dakota Territorial Legislature when Hanson County was divided into several parts. It was named for Ephriam Miner, a territorial legislator, and Nelson Miner, a territorial legislator and captain in the 1st Dakota Cavalry. At the time, Miner County spanned the southern half of present-day Miner and Sanborn counties; Bramble County (now extinct) spanned the northern portion of these counties. In 1879 the legislature combined Miner, Bramble, and portions of Wetmore counties, and eliminated the latter two. The new Miner County was organized the following year with Forestburg as the county seat. In 1883 the county was divided; the western portion being renamed Sanborn County, and the eastern portion retaining the name Miner County. Howard was named the county seat of Miner County.

In 1881, the Milwaukee Road railroad opened tracks in Miner County that followed Fort Ridgely Road from east to west, connecting Madison to Woonsocket. The Chicago and North Western railroad opened tracks from Hawarden, Iowa, to Iroquois, crossing northwest across the county in 1882. These railroads have since abandoned their tracks in the county.

The first settler in Miner County was Matthew A. Moore, who homesteaded near the present site of Howard in the spring of 1879. Significant homesteading started in the latter part of 1879 and concluded in 1884, when all available government land had been claimed. Settlers were primarily Norwegian, German, Danish, Welsh, Irish and Swedish.

On August 28, 1884, the second known photograph of a tornado was taken in Miner County. See 1884 Howard, South Dakota tornado.

The current Miner County Courthouse was built in 1938 at a cost of $107,000 by the Great Depression-era Public Works Administration and was dedicated on September 26, 1938.

On June 13, 1943, two B-17 bombers from the 393rd Bomb Group of the Sioux City Army Air Base collided while on a training exercise over Miner County. One plane crashed immediately, and the other made a controlled landing in a creek bed several miles away. Eleven airmen were killed.

== Geography ==
The terrain of Miner County consists of rolling hills, dotted with lakes and ponds, and generally devoted to agriculture. The terrain generally slopes to the south and southwest, with its highest point occurring along the north boundary line in the northeast part of the county, at 1,729 ft (527 m) ASL. The county has a total area of 572 square miles (1,480 km^{2}), of which 570 square miles (1,500 km^{2}) is land and 1.6 square miles (4.1 km^{2}) (0.3%) is water.

=== Major highways ===
- U.S. Route 81
- South Dakota Highway 25
- South Dakota Highway 34

=== Adjacent counties ===
- Kingsbury County – north
- Lake County – east
- McCook County – southeast
- Hanson County – southwest
- Sanborn County – west

=== Protected areas ===
- Bitter Lake Public Shooting Area
- Burke Slough Public Shooting Area
- Morris Lake Public Shooting Area
- Twin Lakes Public Shooting Area

=== Lakes ===
- Bitter Lake
- Glee Lake
- Lake Carthage
- Lake Thompson
- Morris Lake
- Ness Chain Lake
- Stone House Lake
- Twin Lakes

== Demographics ==
Historical population
Census	Pop.	Note	%±
1880	363		—
1890	5,165		1,322.9%
1900	5,864		13.5%
1910	7,661		30.6%
1920	8,560		11.7%
1930	8,376		−2.1%
1940	6,836		−18.4%
1950	6,268		−8.3%
1960	5,398		−13.9%
1970	4,454		−17.5%
1980	3,739		−16.1%
1990	3,272		−12.5%
2000	2,884		−11.9%
2010	2,389		−17.2%
2020	2,298		−3.8%
2025 (est.)	2,281	▼	−0.7%
U.S. Decennial Census

=== 2020 census ===
As of the 2020 census, there were 2,298 people, 943 households, and 570 families residing in the county. The population density was 4.0 inhabitants per square mile (1.5/km^{2}).

Of the residents, 22.7% were under the age of 18 and 24.6% were 65 years of age or older; the median age was 45.3 years. For every 100 females there were 96.4 males, and for every 100 females age 18 and over there were 96.0 males.

The racial makeup of the county was 95.1% White, 0.2% Black or African American, 0.5% American Indian and Alaska Native, 0.3% Asian, 0.7% from some other race, and 3.3% from two or more races. Hispanic or Latino residents of any race comprised 1.8% of the population.

There were 943 households in the county, of which 24.2% had children under the age of 18 living with them and 21.7% had a female householder with no spouse or partner present. About 35.2% of all households were made up of individuals and 19.6% had someone living alone who was 65 years of age or older.

There were 1,189 housing units, of which 20.7% were vacant. Among occupied housing units, 82.9% were owner-occupied and 17.1% were renter-occupied. The homeowner vacancy rate was 0.8% and the rental vacancy rate was 16.1%.

=== 2010 census ===
As of the 2010 census, there were 2,389 people, 1,032 households, and 606 families in the county. The population density was 4.2 inhabitants per square mile (1.6/km^{2}). There were 1,308 housing units at an average density of 2.3 units per square mile (0.89 units/km^{2}). The racial makeup of the county was 97.8% white, 0.4% Asian, 0.2% American Indian, 0.1% black or African American, 0.7% from other races, and 0.8% from two or more races. Those of Hispanic or Latino origin made up 1.3% of the population. In terms of ancestry, 54.2% were German, 20.7% were Norwegian, 12.4% were Irish, 5.7% were English, 5.7% were Swedish, and 4.2% were American.

Of the 1,032 households, 24.8% had children under the age of 18 living with them, 50.3% were married couples living together, 5.6% had a female householder with no husband present, 41.3% were non-families, and 37.6% of all households were made up of individuals. The average household size was 2.24 and the average family size was 2.97. The median age was 46.4 years.

The median income for a household in the county was $43,958 and the median income for a family was $54,650. Males had a median income of $33,984 versus $25,221 for females. The per capita income for the county was $25,450. About 2.7% of families and 8.8% of the population were below the poverty line, including 8.2% of those under age 18 and 15.4% of those age 65 or over.

== Communities ==
=== Cities ===
- Carthage
- Howard (county seat)

=== Towns ===
- Canova
- Vilas

=== Census-designated places ===
- Cloverleaf Colony
- Fedora
- Roswell
- Shannon Colony

=== Unincorporated community ===
- Epiphany (partial)

=== Ghost town(s) ===
- Argonne

== Government ==
=== Townships ===
- Adams
- Beaver
- Belleview
- Canova
- Carthage
- Clearwater
- Clinton
- Grafton
- Green Valley
- Henden
- Howard
- Miner
- Redstone
- Rock Creek
- Roswell
- Vermillion

== Politics ==
Miner County voters have tended to vote Republican the past two decades.

United States presidential election results for Miner County, South Dakota
Year	Republican		Democratic		Third party(ies)	
Year	No.	%	No.	%	No.	%
1892	486	38.57%	290	23.02%	484	38.41%
1896	582	45.05%	705	54.57%	5	0.39%
1900	662	48.01%	697	50.54%	20	1.45%
1904	893	61.29%	475	32.60%	89	6.11%
1908	906	53.93%	720	42.86%	54	3.21%
1912	0	0.00%	720	43.43%	938	56.57%
1916	1,006	52.21%	880	45.67%	41	2.13%
1920	1,450	56.73%	651	25.47%	455	17.80%
1924	995	35.65%	308	11.04%	1,488	53.31%
1928	1,990	59.37%	1,341	40.01%	21	0.63%
1932	976	28.57%	2,332	68.27%	108	3.16%
1936	1,377	38.77%	2,051	57.74%	124	3.49%
1940	2,095	60.55%	1,365	39.45%	0	0.00%
1944	1,544	58.62%	1,090	41.38%	0	0.00%
1948	1,188	45.92%	1,373	53.07%	26	1.01%
1952	1,964	65.62%	1,029	34.38%	0	0.00%
1956	1,456	48.97%	1,517	51.03%	0	0.00%
1960	1,377	51.13%	1,316	48.87%	0	0.00%
1964	945	36.01%	1,679	63.99%	0	0.00%
1968	1,045	43.69%	1,255	52.47%	92	3.85%
1972	1,059	44.03%	1,337	55.59%	9	0.37%
1976	839	39.21%	1,289	60.23%	12	0.56%
1980	1,172	53.98%	833	38.37%	166	7.65%
1984	1,004	50.78%	960	48.56%	13	0.66%
1988	795	45.30%	955	54.42%	5	0.28%
1992	543	34.28%	698	44.07%	343	21.65%
1996	571	38.35%	739	49.63%	179	12.02%
2000	724	57.19%	523	41.31%	19	1.50%
2004	810	55.10%	641	43.61%	19	1.29%
2008	577	47.37%	605	49.67%	36	2.96%
2012	636	55.79%	479	42.02%	25	2.19%
2016	706	66.35%	281	26.41%	77	7.24%
2020	787	69.16%	320	28.12%	31	2.72%
2024	841	72.07%	293	25.11%	33	2.83%

== Education ==
School districts include:

- Hanson School District 30-1
- Howard School District 48-3
- McCook Central School District 43-7
- Oldham-Ramona-Rutland School District 39-6
- Sanborn Central School District 55-5

The Oldham-Ramona School District 39-5, in the county, consolidated into ORR in 2023.

== See also ==
- 1884 Howard, South Dakota tornado
- National Register of Historic Places listings in Miner County, South Dakota
