= List of meteorological photos and videos =

Bill Koch stands next to the top of a utility pole in North Dakota during a blizzard
- Image restricted due to copyright
- View photograph

There are several notable photographs or videos in the field of meteorology, the study of the Earth's atmosphere, climate, and weather. These images or videos may be referred to as historic, most important, most iconic, or most influential weather-related photographs or weather-related videos.

== List ==
=== 19th century ===
Image	Photographer	Date	Event	Notes
	William N. Jennings	2 September 1882	Lightning	The first ever photograph of lightning, taken by William N. Jennings in 1882.
	A. A. Adams	26 April 1884	1884 Garnett tornado	A rope tornado over Garnett, Kansas. It claims alongside the F. N. Robinson tornado photograph to be the oldest photograph of a tornado, but this claim has been disputed.
	F. N. Robinson	28 August 1884	1884 Howard tornado	An iconic and widely used photograph that is claimed by the National Weather Service to be the oldest known photograph of a tornado.

=== 20th century ===
Image	Photographer	Date	Event	Notes
	Herald Examiner	20 March 1925	1925 Tri-State tornado	An iconic and widely used photograph of the front cover of the Herald Examiner following the 1925 Tri-State tornado.
	Dorothea Lange	6 March 1936	Dust Bowl / Great Depression	Migrant Mother is a 1936 photograph taken in Nipomo, California, by American photographer Dorothea Lange. The photo depicts a mother anxiously gazing into the distance, with an infant in her lap and two older children huddling close by. The photo captures the plight of migrant farm workers who arrived in California en masse looking for employment during the Great Depression. Initially anonymous, the woman in the photo was identified as Florence Owens Thompson in 1978, following the work of a journalist for the California-based newspaper The Modesto Bee. The photograph has been widely described as one of the most important and iconic photographs of the 20th century.
	John Gosen	8 June 1951	1951 Corn tornado	This video was the first to feature a tornado in the United States.
	Don Staggs and University of Illinois Willard Airport staff	9 April 1953	Champaign, Illinois F3 tornado	The first hook echo feature ever observed on radar was noted by a radar technician, during a damaging tornado in the Champaign, Illinois, area. Later on, the location of the echo was revealed to correspond with an ongoing tornado; this event led to the creation of a nationwide radar network for the detection of severe weather.
	Paul Huffman	11 April 1965	1965 Palm Sunday tornado outbreak	Massive double-funnel tornado near Dunlap, Indiana is a 1965 black-and-white photograph of a multi-vortex tornado in Elkhart, Indiana during the 1965 Palm Sunday tornado outbreak. The photograph, taken by Paul Huffman for The Elkhart Truth, was described as "one of the most famous tornado photographs ever taken" and The Indianapolis Star described the image as "one of the most the iconic weather photographs of the century".
	Ernest Feland	9 March 1966	Blizzard of March 2–5, 1966	A photo depicting North Dakota Department of Transportation worker Bill Koch next to a utility pole almost completely covered in snow, taken by fellow NDDOT worker Ernest Feland.
Belvidere High School Tornado Wennmacher family, April 21, 1967: Image restricted due to copyright; View photograph	Rockford Morning Star	21 April 1967	1967 Belvidere tornado	This photo depicts survivors of the tornado outside of the Belvidere High School, which sustained a direct hit from the F4 tornado, one of many during the Oak Lawn tornado outbreak. Mike Doyle, author of the book The 1967 Belvidere tornado, described this photo as "perhaps the most famous photo in Boone County history" and "one of the most well-known disaster photos in history".
	Fred Stewart	3 April 1974	1974 Xenia tornado	An iconic photograph of the 1974 Xenia tornado, taken by Fred Stewart. The Associated Press bought the photographs shortly after they were run in local newspapers.
The Jordan, Iowa Tornado: One Year Later, 1977: Image restricted due to copyright; View video	Charles Barthold	13 June 1976	1976 Jordan tornado	This film of the F5 Jordan tornado was used by Ted Fujita to further his theory of the satellite tornado; in this case, an intense F3 tornado that surrounded the main tornado throughout much of its life. The film itself earned Barthold a Peabody Award.
The Tornado Girl: Image restricted due to copyright; View photograph	Merrilee Thomas	23 April 1989	Furnas County tornado	Merrilee Thomas of Beaver City, Nebraska took this photograph of her daughter Audra Thomas in Furnas County, Nebraska. The photograph won second place in a national Kodak contest, and it was used in numerous exhibitions.
The "Dead Man Walking": Image restricted due to copyright; View photograph	Scott Beckwith	May 27, 1997	Jarrell tornado	This photograph was taken as the F5 Jarrell tornado was undergoing tornadogenesis, with its multiple-vortex structure being compared to the appearance of the Grim Reaper. The image was part of a sequence taken by Scott Beckwith depicting the tornado's development.
Tammy Holmgren huddled with her two daughters under an overpass as a tornado approached: Image restricted due to copyright; View photograph	J. Pat Carter	3 May 1999	1999 Bridge Creek–Moore tornado	A photograph of Tammy Holmgren huddled with her two daughters under an overpass as the 1999 Bridge Creek–Moore tornado approached. This photograph was taken by Associated Press photographer J. Pat Carter. It was chosen by CNN to be the photographic representation of all tornadic activity in the 1990s.

=== 21st century ===
Image	Photographer	Date	Event	Notes
	Ed Lu	15 September 2003	Hurricane Isabel	A photograph of Hurricane Isabel, taken by astronaut Ed Lu on board the International Space Station. This photograph has been widely used and has been described as one of "the most iconic hurricane photos of all time".
Residents are rescued by helicopter from: Image restricted due to copyright; View photograph	David J. Phillip	1 September 2005	Hurricane Katrina	Hurricane Katrina is a photograph of residents being rescued by helicopter during Hurricane Katrina. This photograph was taken by Agence France-Presse photographer David J. Phillip. Life Magazine considers this to be one of the "most important photos ever".
HURRICANE KATRINA REFUGEES: Image restricted due to copyright; View photograph	Eric Gay	3 September 2005	Hurricane Katrina	Hurricane Katrina Evacuation is a photograph of Tanisha Belvin (five-years-old) holding the hand of Nita LaGarde (89-years-old), as they are evacuated from New Orleans during Hurricane Katrina. This photograph was taken by Associated Press photographer Eric Gay. Esquire considers this to be one of the "world's most remarkable photographs".
A man clings to the top of a vehicle before being rescued by the U.S. Coast Guard from the flooded streets of New Orleans: Image restricted due to copyright; View photograph	Robert Galbraith	4 September 2005	Hurricane Katrina	Hurricane Katrina is a photograph of a man in New Orleans, clinging to the top of a vehicle, waiting to be rescued by the United States Coast Guard during Hurricane Katrina. The photograph was taken by Reuters photographer Robert Galbraith. Esquire considers this to be one of the "world's most remarkable photographs".
	Greg Henshall	16 May 2007	Greensburg tornado	An iconic photograph of Greensburg, Kansas, which was completely destroyed by the 2007 Greensburg tornado, which was rated EF5 on the Enhanced Fujita scale. This photograph was taken by Greg Henshall, an employee with the Federal Emergency Management Agency (FEMA).
	Justin Hobson	22 June 2007	2007 Elie tornado	An iconic and widely used photograph of the 2007 Elie tornado, taken by Justin Hobson.
Faye Hyde's moving photo became the image of April 27, 2011 tornadoes: Image restricted due to copyright; View photograph	Faye Hyde	27 April 2011	2011 Super Outbreak	
The original "Hurricane Shark" image: Image restricted due to copyright; View photograph	Unknown	2011	Hurricane Irene	The original "Hurricane Shark" photoshopped image was created during Hurricane Irene in 2011, with a claim that the shark was on a street in Puerto Rico.
Cobb family staggering out of Briarwood Elementary School: Image restricted due to copyright; View photograph	Paul Hellstern	20 May 2013	2013 Moore tornado	Cobb family staggering out of Briarwood Elementary School — A photograph of the Cobb family walking away, injured, from Briarwood Elementary School, which was completely destroyed by the 2013 Moore tornado. This photograph was taken by Paul Hellstern, a photographer for The Oklahoman and Associated Press.
MAN FILMS MONSTER TORNADO HITTING HIS HOUSE! Fairdale IL #Tornado: Video restricted due to copyright; View video	Clem Schultz	9 April 2015	2015 Rochelle–Fairdale tornado	Clem Schultz recorded three minutes of video footage from the upstairs of his house in Fairdale, Illinois of the violent tornado approaching his community. The footage concludes with the tornado reaching Schultz's location. Clem Schultz was significantly injured in this event, and his wife was killed.
WALKING ON THIN ICE.: Image restricted due to copyright; View photograph	Sergio Pitamitz	2018	Climate change	Climate Change is a photograph of a polar bear walking along ice on the ocean. Life Magazine considers this to be one of the "most important photos ever", especially with regards to climate change.
Debris from a home litters a yard the day after a tornado blew it off its foundation in Beauregard, Alabama: Image restricted due to copyright; View photograph	David Goldman	4 March 2019	2019 Beauregard tornado	A widely used photograph, taken by Associated Press photographer David Goldman, showing the debris from a house that was blown off its foundation and completely destroyed by the Beauregard tornado. The New York Times published that this was one of the top photographs taken during 2019.
Anja Sommerfeld from the Alfred Wegener Institute for Polar and Marine Research launched an ozone-sonde: Image restricted due to copyright; View photograph	Esther Horvath	6 April 2019	Climate change	An award-winning photograph by The New York Times photographer Esther Horvath, showing Anja Sommerfeld launching a weather balloon containing an ozone sounde to measure the ozone levels above the Alfred Wegener Institute for Polar and Marine Research in Germany.
Lightning strike behind United States President Donald Trump getting off Air Force One: Image restricted due to copyright; View photograph	Doug Mills	28 August 2020	Donald Trump 2020 presidential campaign	An iconic and widely used photograph, taken by New York Times photographer Doug Mills, of a lightning strike behind United States President Donald Trump, after he returned on Air Force One from a campaign rally in New Hampshire. Several news outlets, including The New York Times, CNN, NBC News, and The Atlantic selected the photo as one of the best photographs of 2020 and of Trump's first presidency.
JAW-DROPPING Tornado Drone Footage Shows Kansas Town Get Ripped Apart: Video restricted due to copyright; View video	Reed Timmer	29 April 2022	2022 Andover tornado	JAW-DROPPING Tornado Drone Footage Shows Kansas Town Get Ripped Apart is a video of the 2022 Andover tornado, from a drone operated by meteorologist and storm chaser Reed Timmer.
A TV journalist taking photos of boats damaged by Hurricane Ian in Fort Myers, Florida: Image restricted due to copyright; View photograph	Giorgio Viera	29 September 2022	Hurricane Ian	A widely used iconic photograph, taken by Associated Press photographer Giorgio Viera, of journalist inspecting the damage from Hurricane Ian. The Straits Times considers this one of the most iconic photographs during 2022.
'Dear, Jesus, please help them': Video restricted due to copyright; View video	Matt Laubhan	24 March 2023	2023 Amory tornado	'Dear, Jesus, please help them' is live coverage from WTVA Chief Meteorologist Matt Laubhan during the 2023 Amory tornado, where Laubhan prayed on live television for the people in Amory, Mississippi.
Lightning strikes as smoke billows following an Israeli bombardment of Gaza City: Image restricted due to copyright; View photograph	Mohammed Abed	9 October 2023	Israeli bombing of the Gaza Strip	An iconic and widely used photograph by Agence France-Presse and Getty Images photographer Mohammed Abed, of lightning strikes as smoke rises following Israeli airstrikes of Gaza City amid the Israeli bombing of the Gaza Strip during the Israel–Hamas war. This photograph was named one of the top and "greatest" photographs to have been taken during 2023 by TIME Magazine. The Week named this photograph as one of that weeks' best photographs. In October 2024, CNN named this photograph as one of "the defining images of the Israel–Hamas war".
Oklahoma Town Of Barnsdall Hit By Deadly Tornado: Image restricted due to copyright; View photograph	Brandon Bell	7 May 2024	2024 Barnsdall–Bartlesville tornado	Oklahoma Town Of Barnsdall Hit By Deadly Tornado is a photograph by Getty Images photographer Brandon Bell, showing a child walking alone through a neighborhood damaged by the 2024 Barnsdall–Bartlesville EF4 tornado. CNN published that this was one of "the most visually powerful and important" photographs during 2024.
	Ted Hudson	26 September 2024	Hurricane Helene	An iconic and widely used screengrab taken from the body camera of United States Coast Guard Petty Officer 2nd Class Ted Hudson, while he rescued a man and his dog after their sailboat became disabled and started taking on water off Sanibel Island, Florida during Hurricane Helene.
	Artificial intelligence	30 September 2024	Hurricane Helene	Donald Trump wading through floodwaters is an artificial intelligence-generated viral image as part of the misinformation that surrounded Hurricane Helene in 2024.
Mourners at the collective funeral for victims of a landslide caused by floods in Jablanica, Bosnia: Image restricted due to copyright; View photograph	Armin Durgut	15 October 2024	2024 Bosnia and Herzegovina floods	A widely used photograph, taken by Associated Press photographer Armin Durgut, of mourners gathered at a collective funeral for 19 victims of a landslide caused by floods in Jablanica, Bosnia. TIME Magazine considered this photograph to be one of the top and most important photographs of 2024.

== See also ==
- List of photographs considered the most important
