= Coughlin House =

Historic house in South Dakota, United States

- U.S. National Register of Historic Places
- Location within South Dakota Location within the United States
- Location: 260 W. Main St., Carthage, South Dakota
- Coordinates: 44°10′25″N 97°43′11″W
- Area: less than one acre
- Built: 1898
- Built by: James Coughlin
- Architectural style: Folk Victorian
- NRHP reference No.: 06000460
- Added to NRHP: May 31, 2006

The Coughlin House is a historic house at 260 West Main Street in Carthage, South Dakota. It is a 2 1/2-story wood-frame structure with a gable roof. Its main (southern) facade has a centered shed-roof porch supported by spindled columns, with jigsaw-cut balustrade and trim. The house was built in 1898 by James Coughlin, an Irish immigrant, and is a well-preserved local example of Folk Victorian architecture.

The house was listed on the National Register of Historic Places in 2006.
