= 2004 South Dakota Democratic presidential primary =

- June 1, 2004

22 Democratic National Convention delegates (14 pledged, 8 unpledged) The number of pledged delegates received is determined by the popular vote
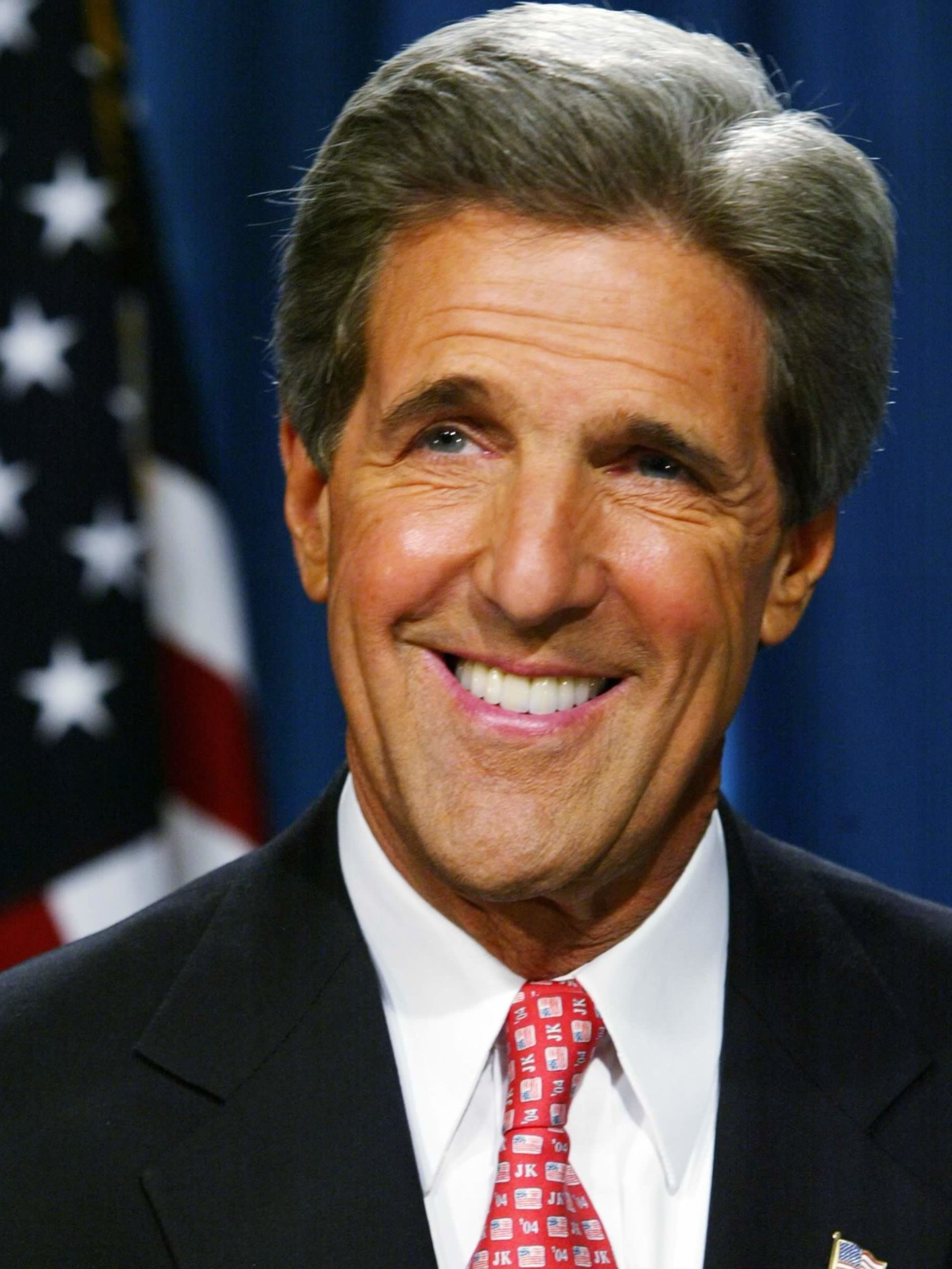

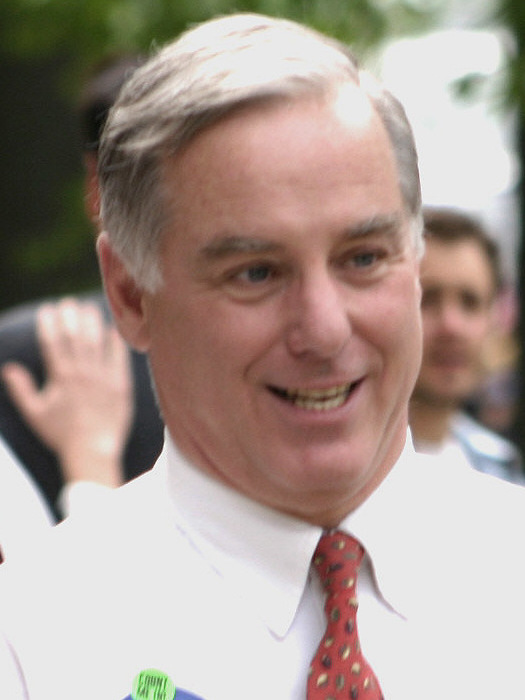
Candidate	John Kerry	Uncommitted	Howard Dean (withdrawn)
Home state	Massachusetts	–	Vermont
Delegate count	14	0	0
Popular vote	69,473	5,105	4,838
Percentage	82.31%	6.05%	5.73%
- Primary results by county Kerry: 60–70% 70–80% 80–90%

The 2004 South Dakota Democratic presidential primary was held on June 1 in the U.S. state of South Dakota as one of the Democratic Party's statewide nomination contests ahead of the 2004 presidential election.

== Results ==
2004 South Dakota Democratic presidential primary
Candidate	Votes	%	Delegates
John Kerry	69,473	82.31	14
Uncommitted	5,105	6.05	0
Howard Dean (withdrawn)	4,838	5.73	0
Lyndon LaRouche	2,943	3.49	0
Dennis Kucinich	2,046	2.42	0
Total	84,405	100%	14
