= Howard, South Dakota =

- City
- Location in Miner County and the state of South Dakota
- Coordinates: 44°00′42″N 97°31′28″W
- Country: United States
- State: South Dakota
- County: Miner
- Incorporated: 1881

Government
  - Mayor: Eric Rentschler

Area
  - Total: 0.97 sq mi (2.50 km^{2})
  - Land: 0.97 sq mi (2.50 km^{2})
  - Water: 0 sq mi (0.00 km^{2})
- Elevation: 1,562 ft (476 m)

Population (2020)
  - Total: 848
  - Density: 878.8/sq mi (339.31/km^{2})
- Time zone: UTC-6 (Central (CST))
  - Summer (DST): UTC-5 (CDT)
- ZIP code: 57349
- Area code: 605
- FIPS code: 46-30460
- GNIS feature ID: 1267429
- Website: www.cityofhoward.com

Howard is a city in Miner County, South Dakota, United States. The population was 848 at the 2020 census. It is the county seat and most populous city in Miner County.

== History ==
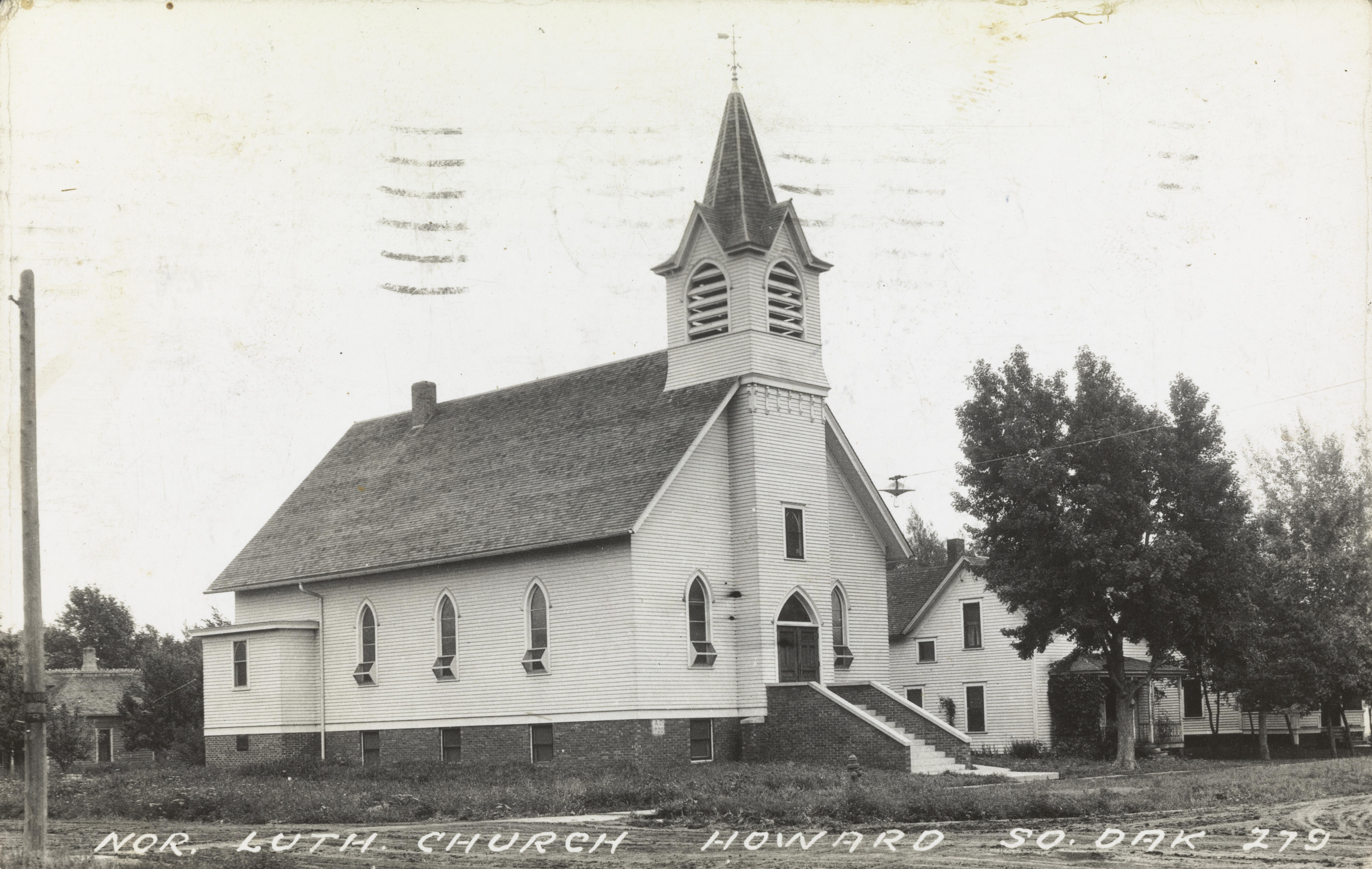
Norwegian Lutheran Church in Howard.

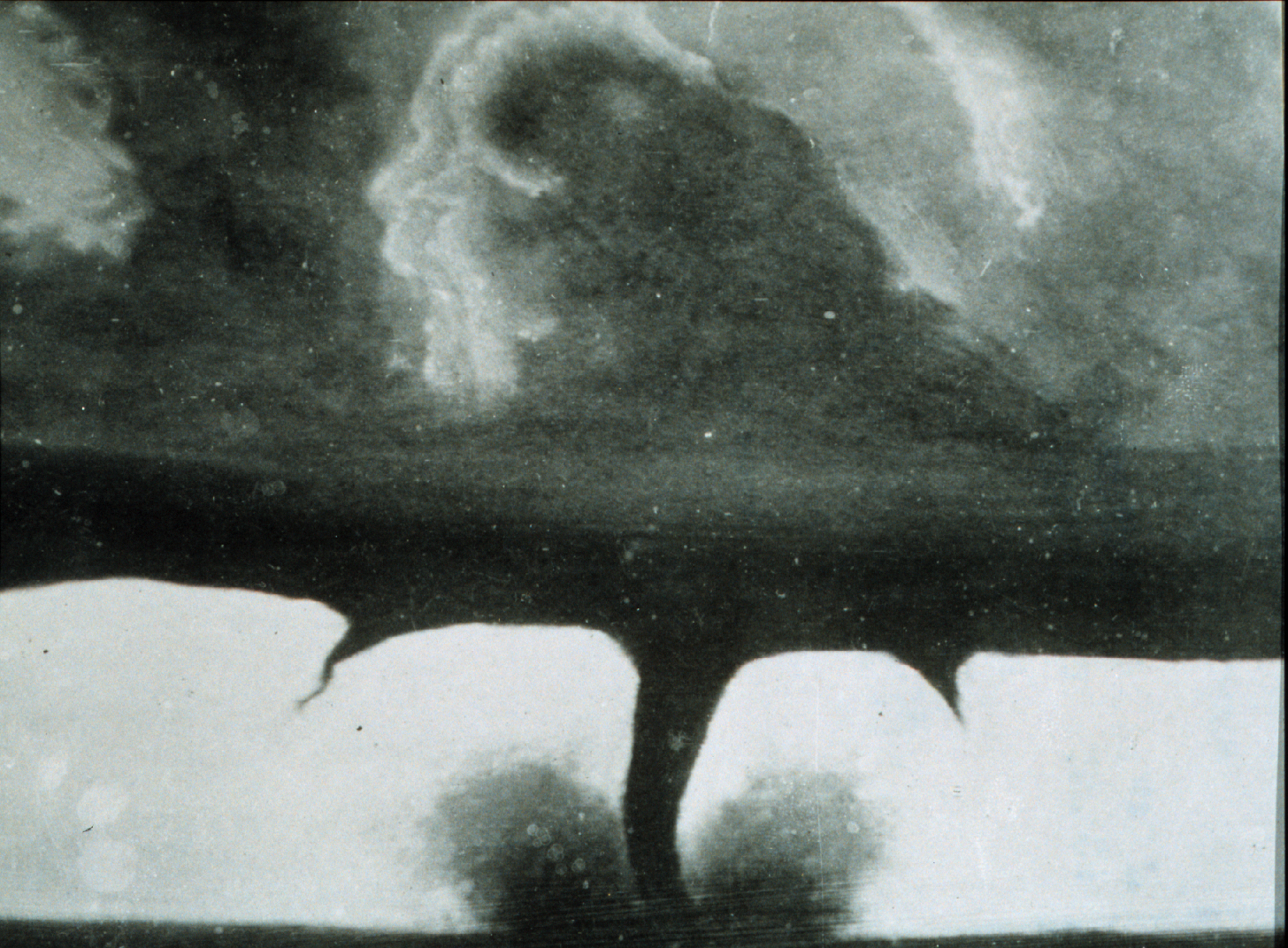
One of the first ever photographs of a tornado, taken near Howard.

The city of Howard was established in 1881, shortly after the Southern Minnesota Railway was extended to that point. The city was named for Howard Farmer, the son of the townsite owner, J. D. Farmer. In 1883, when Miner and Sanborn counties were organized, the town was named the county seat of Miner County.

One of the first known photographs of a tornado is an image of the 1884 Howard, South Dakota, tornado.

The first public library in Dakota Territory was the Howard Public Library, chartered in 1886.

Howard became the first municipality in South Dakota to own and operate its own wind turbines in 2001.

Since 2001, over 200 new jobs have been created in the community. From 1996 to 2008, the city's sales tax revenues increased 123%.

== Geography ==
Howard is located in southeastern South Dakota and is situated on South Dakota Highway 34.

According to the United States Census Bureau, the city has a total area of 0.95 square miles (2.46 km^{2}), all land.

=== Climate ===
Climate data for Howard, South Dakota (1991−2020 normals, extremes 1893−present)
Month	Jan	Feb	Mar	Apr	May	Jun	Jul	Aug	Sep	Oct	Nov	Dec	Year
Record high °F (°C)	63 (17)	70 (21)	89 (32)	96 (36)	109 (43)	108 (42)	113 (45)	113 (45)	106 (41)	95 (35)	80 (27)	67 (19)	113 (45)
Mean maximum °F (°C)	46.2 (7.9)	51.5 (10.8)	69.1 (20.6)	81.0 (27.2)	87.7 (30.9)	92.2 (33.4)	95.0 (35.0)	93.1 (33.9)	89.1 (31.7)	81.0 (27.2)	65.3 (18.5)	49.0 (9.4)	97.0 (36.1)
Mean daily maximum °F (°C)	29.1 (−1.6)	34.1 (1.2)	46.8 (8.2)	61.0 (16.1)	72.5 (22.5)	82.3 (27.9)	87.3 (30.7)	84.9 (29.4)	77.4 (25.2)	62.6 (17.0)	46.9 (8.3)	33.1 (0.6)	59.8 (15.4)
Daily mean °F (°C)	16.8 (−8.4)	21.5 (−5.8)	33.8 (1.0)	46.4 (8.0)	58.7 (14.8)	69.1 (20.6)	73.7 (23.2)	71.3 (21.8)	62.9 (17.2)	48.8 (9.3)	34.1 (1.2)	21.6 (−5.8)	46.6 (8.1)
Mean daily minimum °F (°C)	4.6 (−15.2)	9.0 (−12.8)	20.8 (−6.2)	31.8 (−0.1)	44.8 (7.1)	55.8 (13.2)	60.2 (15.7)	57.6 (14.2)	48.4 (9.1)	35.1 (1.7)	21.3 (−5.9)	10.2 (−12.1)	33.3 (0.7)
Mean minimum °F (°C)	−17.2 (−27.3)	−11.5 (−24.2)	−1.9 (−18.8)	17.7 (−7.9)	31.5 (−0.3)	45.3 (7.4)	50.2 (10.1)	48.2 (9.0)	33.9 (1.1)	19.1 (−7.2)	4.0 (−15.6)	−11.0 (−23.9)	−21.0 (−29.4)
Record low °F (°C)	−46 (−43)	−42 (−41)	−24 (−31)	1 (−17)	16 (−9)	19 (−7)	34 (1)	26 (−3)	13 (−11)	−11 (−24)	−23 (−31)	−36 (−38)	−46 (−43)
Average precipitation inches (mm)	0.63 (16)	0.67 (17)	1.37 (35)	2.68 (68)	3.88 (99)	3.70 (94)	3.51 (89)	2.89 (73)	2.96 (75)	2.35 (60)	1.02 (26)	0.69 (18)	26.35 (669)
Average snowfall inches (cm)	5.8 (15)	6.4 (16)	6.6 (17)	5.2 (13)	0.0 (0.0)	0.0 (0.0)	0.0 (0.0)	0.0 (0.0)	0.0 (0.0)	1.0 (2.5)	3.2 (8.1)	7.6 (19)	35.8 (91)
Average precipitation days (≥ 0.01 in)	4.6	4.6	5.4	8.6	9.9	10.7	7.4	7.1	6.6	6.1	3.8	4.8	79.6
Average snowy days (≥ 0.1 in)	3.9	3.8	2.6	1.5	0.0	0.0	0.0	0.0	0.0	0.7	1.7	3.8	18.0
Source: NOAA

== Demographics ==
Historical population
Census	Pop.	Note	%±
1900	588		—
1910	1,026		74.5%
1920	1,325		29.1%
1930	1,224		−7.6%
1940	1,193		−2.5%
1950	1,251		4.9%
1960	1,208		−3.4%
1970	1,175		−2.7%
1980	1,169		−0.5%
1990	1,156		−1.1%
2000	1,071		−7.4%
2010	858		−19.9%
2020	848		−1.2%
U.S. Decennial Census

=== 2020 census ===
As of the 2020 census, Howard had a population of 848. The median age was 49.5 years, with 19.6% of residents under the age of 18 and 28.8% of residents 65 years of age or older. For every 100 females there were 88.9 males, and for every 100 females age 18 and over there were 87.4 males age 18 and over.

All 848 residents lived in rural areas, with 0.0% living in urban areas.

There were 373 households in Howard, of which 20.1% had children under the age of 18 living in them. Of all households, 42.1% were married-couple households, 24.4% had a male householder with no spouse or partner present, and 28.7% had a female householder with no spouse or partner present. About 45.3% of all households were made up of individuals and 23.3% had someone living alone who was 65 years of age or older.

There were 447 housing units, of which 16.6% were vacant. The homeowner vacancy rate was 0.4% and the rental vacancy rate was 15.5%.

Racial composition as of the 2020 census
Race	Number	Percent
White	778	91.7%
Black or African American	3	0.4%
American Indian and Alaska Native	8	0.9%
Asian	4	0.5%
Native Hawaiian and Other Pacific Islander	0	0.0%
Some other race	10	1.2%
Two or more races	45	5.3%
Hispanic or Latino (of any race)	23	2.7%

=== 2010 census ===
As of the census of 2010, there were 858 people, 414 households, and 195 families residing in the city. The population density was 903.2 inhabitants per square mile (348.7/km^{2}). There were 509 housing units at an average density of 535.8 units per square mile (206.9 units/km^{2}). The racial makeup of the city was 97.8% White, 0.1% Native American, 0.1% Asian, 0.6% from other races, and 1.4% from two or more races. Hispanic or Latino of any race were 1.3% of the population.

There were 414 households, of which 20.8% had children under the age of 18 living with them, 38.2% were married couples living together, 7.0% had a female householder with no husband present, 1.9% had a male householder with no wife present, and 52.9% were non-families. 49.3% of all households were made up of individuals, and 28.5% had someone living alone who was 65 years of age or older. The average household size was 1.97 and the average family size was 2.92.

The median age in the city was 50.5 years. 21.2% of residents were under the age of 18; 4.1% were between the ages of 18 and 24; 17.2% were from 25 to 44; 27.2% were from 45 to 64; and 30.1% were 65 years of age or older. The gender makeup of the city was 46.9% male and 53.1% female.

=== 2000 census ===
As of the census of 2000, there were 1,071 people, 493 households, and 273 families residing in the city. The population density was 1,138.7 inhabitants per square mile (439.7/km^{2}). There were 557 housing units at an average density of 592.2 units per square mile (228.6 units/km^{2}). The racial makeup of the city was 98.13% White, 0.47% African American, 0.65% Native American, 0.28% Asian, 0.28% from other races, and 0.19% from two or more races. Hispanic or Latino of any race were 1.31% of the population.

There were 493 households, out of which 24.1% had children under the age of 18 living with them, 44.4% were married couples living together, 8.1% had a female householder with no husband present, and 44.6% were non-families. 41.8% of all households were made up of individuals, and 25.8% had someone living alone who was 65 years of age or older. The average household size was 2.06 and the average family size was 2.84.

In the city, the population was spread out, with 22.7% under the age of 18, 5.4% from 18 to 24, 21.4% from 25 to 44, 18.3% from 45 to 64, and 32.2% who were 65 years of age or older. The median age was 46 years. For every 100 females, there were 82.5 males. For every 100 females age 18 and over, there were 78.4 males.

The median income for a household in the city was $26,544, and the median income for a family was $36,518. Males had a median income of $26,250 versus $20,054 for females. The per capita income for the city was $15,121. About 5.3% of families and 9.6% of the population were below the poverty line, including 8.3% of those under age 18 and 16.2% of those age 65 or over.

== Education ==
The Howard School District (encompassing most of Miner County and small portions of McCook, Hanson, and Kingsbury counties) is based in Howard. The district operates Howard Elementary School, Howard Jr. High School and Howard Senior High School within the town.

Howard Senior High School has a boy's varsity basketball, football, and golf. It also has girl's varsity volleyball, basketball, and golf. Howard boy's varsity basketball team won the 2024 South Dakota Class B State Championship. The Howard boy's varsity football team won the 2024 9A State Championship. That title win brought Howard their fifth state championship.

St. Agatha School was a private, Catholic school located in Howard. The high school closed in 1966. The grade school closed a few years later.

== Notable people ==
- Cameron Hawley, author, script writer
- Johan Andreas Holvik, author and educator
- Wayne Rasmussen, professional football player

== See also ==
- List of cities in South Dakota
