= National Register of Historic Places listings in Harding County, South Dakota =

Location of Harding County in South Dakota

This is a list of the National Register of Historic Places listings in Harding County, South Dakota.

This is intended to be a complete list of the properties on the National Register of Historic Places in Harding County, South Dakota, United States. The locations of National Register properties for which the latitude and longitude coordinates are included below, may be seen in a map.

There are 56 properties listed on the National Register in the county.

This National Park Service list is complete through NPS recent listings posted March 14, 2025.

== Current listings ==
	Name on the Register	Image	Date listed	Location	City or town	Description
1	Archeological Site No. 39HN1	Archeological Site No. 39HN1	March 7, 1994 (#94000108)	Address restricted	Ludlow	
2	Archeological Site No. 39HN5	Archeological Site No. 39HN5	March 7, 1994 (#94000109)	Address restricted	Ludlow	
3	Archeological Site No. 39HN17	Archeological Site No. 39HN17	August 6, 1993 (#93000805)	Address restricted	Ludlow	
4	Archeological Site No. 39HN18	Archeological Site No. 39HN18	March 7, 1994 (#94000088)	Address restricted	Ludlow	
5	Archeological Site No. 39HN21	Archeological Site No. 39HN21	March 7, 1994 (#94000124)	Address restricted	Ludlow	
6	Archeological Site No. 39HN22	Archeological Site No. 39HN22	March 7, 1994 (#94000123)	Address restricted	Ludlow	
7	Archeological Site No. 39HN26	Archeological Site No. 39HN26	March 7, 1994 (#94000122)	Address restricted	Ludlow	
8	Archeological Site No. 39HN30	Archeological Site No. 39HN30	March 7, 1994 (#94000121)	Address restricted	Ludlow	
9	Archeological Site No. 39HN50	Archeological Site No. 39HN50	March 7, 1994 (#94000119)	Address restricted	Ludlow	
10	Archeological Site No. 39HN53	Archeological Site No. 39HN53	March 7, 1994 (#94000118)	Address restricted	Ludlow	
11	Archeological Site No. 39HN54	Archeological Site No. 39HN54	March 7, 1994 (#94000120)	Address restricted	Ludlow	
12	Archeological Site No. 39HN121	Archeological Site No. 39HN121	March 7, 1994 (#94000117)	Address restricted	Ludlow	
13	Archeological Site No. 39HN150	Archeological Site No. 39HN150	March 7, 1994 (#94000114)	Address restricted	Ludlow	
14	Archeological Site No. 39HN155	Archeological Site No. 39HN155	March 7, 1994 (#94000115)	Address restricted	Ludlow	
15	Archeological Site No. 39HN159	Archeological Site No. 39HN159	March 7, 1994 (#94000116)	Address restricted	Ludlow	
16	Archeological Site No. 39HN160	Archeological Site No. 39HN160	March 7, 1994 (#94000113)	Address restricted	Ludlow	
17	Archeological Site No. 39HN162	Archeological Site No. 39HN162	March 7, 1994 (#94000091)	Address restricted	Ludlow	
18	Archeological Site No. 39HN165	Archeological Site No. 39HN165	March 7, 1994 (#94000093)	Address restricted	Ludlow	
19	Archeological Site No. 39HN167	Archeological Site No. 39HN167	March 7, 1994 (#94000092)	Address restricted	Ludlow	
20	Archeological Site No. 39HN168	Archeological Site No. 39HN168	March 7, 1994 (#94000129)	Address restricted	Ludlow	
21	Archeological Site No. 39HN171	Archeological Site No. 39HN171	March 7, 1994 (#94000128)	Address restricted	Ludlow	
22	Archeological Site No. 39HN174	Archeological Site No. 39HN174	March 7, 1994 (#94000127)	Address restricted	Ludlow	
23	Archeological Site No. 39HN177	Archeological Site No. 39HN177	March 7, 1994 (#94000126)	Address restricted	Ludlow	
24	Archeological Site No. 39HN198	Archeological Site No. 39HN198	March 7, 1994 (#94000125)	Address restricted	Ludlow	
25	Archeological Site No. 39HN199	Archeological Site No. 39HN199	March 7, 1994 (#94000110)	Address restricted	Ludlow	
26	Archeological Site No. 39HN205	Archeological Site No. 39HN205	March 7, 1994 (#94000095)	Address restricted	Ludlow	
27	Archeological Site No. 39HN207	Archeological Site No. 39HN207	March 7, 1994 (#94000094)	Address restricted	Ludlow	
28	Archeological Site No. 39HN208	Archeological Site No. 39HN208	August 6, 1993 (#93000794)	Address restricted	Ludlow	
29	Archeological Site No. 39HN209	Archeological Site No. 39HN209	March 7, 1994 (#94000107)	Address restricted	Ludlow	
30	Archeological Site No. 39HN210	Archeological Site No. 39HN210	March 7, 1994 (#94000106)	Address restricted	Ludlow	
31	Archeological Site No. 39HN213	Archeological Site No. 39HN213	March 7, 1994 (#94000105)	Address restricted	Ludlow	
32	Archeological Site No. 39HN217	Archeological Site No. 39HN217	March 7, 1994 (#94000104)	Address restricted	Ludlow	
33	Archeological Site No. 39HN218	Archeological Site No. 39HN218	March 7, 1994 (#94000103)	Address restricted	Ludlow	
34	Archeological Site No. 39HN219	Archeological Site No. 39HN219	March 7, 1994 (#94000102)	Address restricted	Ludlow	
35	Archeological Site No. 39HN227	Archeological Site No. 39HN227	March 7, 1994 (#94000111)	Address restricted	Ludlow	
36	Archeological Site No. 39HN228	Archeological Site No. 39HN228	March 7, 1994 (#94000112)	Address restricted	Ludlow	
37	Archeological Site No. 39HN232	Archeological Site No. 39HN232	March 7, 1994 (#94000101)	Address restricted	Ludlow	
38	Archeological Site No. 39HN234	Archeological Site No. 39HN234	March 7, 1994 (#94000100)	Address restricted	Ludlow	
39	Archeological Site No. 39HN484	Archeological Site No. 39HN484	March 7, 1994 (#94000098)	Address restricted	Ludlow	
40	Archeological Site No. 39HN485	Archeological Site No. 39HN485	March 7, 1994 (#94000099)	Address restricted	Ludlow	
41	Archeological Site No. 39HN486	Archeological Site No. 39HN486	March 7, 1994 (#94000097)	Address restricted	Ludlow	
42	Archeological Site No. 39HN487	Archeological Site No. 39HN487	March 7, 1994 (#94000096)	Address restricted	Ludlow	
43	Thomas Ashcroft Ranch		April 10, 1987 (#87000547)	Floodplain of the South Fork of the Grand River, east-northeast of Buffalo; 45°40′21″N 103°14′24″W	Buffalo	
44	Blake Ranch House		April 10, 1987 (#87000534)	1 mile west of Camp Crook Rd. 45°20′44″N 103°57′17″W	Gustave	
45	Emmanuel Lutheran Church and Cemetery		April 10, 1987 (#87000531)	County Road 858; 45°50′05″N 103°11′28″W	Ralph	
46	Fowler Hotel		September 12, 2008 (#08000886)	103 1st St. SW; 45°34′54″N 103°32′46″W	Buffalo	
47	Giannonatti Ranch		April 10, 1987 (#87000546)	Southern side of an E-W Section Rd. 45°49′27″N 103°15′14″W	Ludlow	
48	Golden Valley Norwegian Lutheran Church	Golden Valley Norwegian Lutheran Church	April 10, 1987 (#87000548)	N-S Section Rd. east of Highway 79; 45°53′06″N 102°56′33″W	Ralph	
49	Axel Johnson Ranch		May 19, 1987 (#87000541)	East of Highway 79 on Sorum Rd. 45°27′46″N 103°02′00″W	Reva	
50	Lightning Spring (39HN204)	Lightning Spring (39HN204)	August 2, 1982 (#82003930)	Address restricted	Ludlow	
51	Little Missouri Bank Building		April 10, 1987 (#87000536)	Main St. 45°33′01″N 103°58′28″W	Camp Crook	
52	John and Daisy May Livingston Ranch		April 10, 1987 (#87000542)	East of Highway 79 on the southern side of Sorum Rd. 45°25′17″N 103°02′01″W	Sorum	
53	Peace Valley Evangelical Church and Cemetery		April 10, 1987 (#87000550)	Eastern side of Highway 79; 45°50′12″N 102°58′59″W	Ralph	
54	L.W. Shevling Ranch		April 10, 1987 (#87000537)	East of Harding in the West Short Pine Hills area 45°23′57″N 103°49′33″W	Harding	
55	Oliver O. Stokes House		April 10, 1987 (#87000532)	Harding Rd. 45°23′49″N 103°50′00″W	Harding	1899-built house was first frame house in the county.
56	Vessey School		April 10, 1987 (#87000553)	County Road 859; 45°54′29″N 103°07′37″W	Haley	

== See also ==
- List of National Historic Landmarks in South Dakota
- National Register of Historic Places listings in South Dakota
