= List of cemeteries in South Dakota =

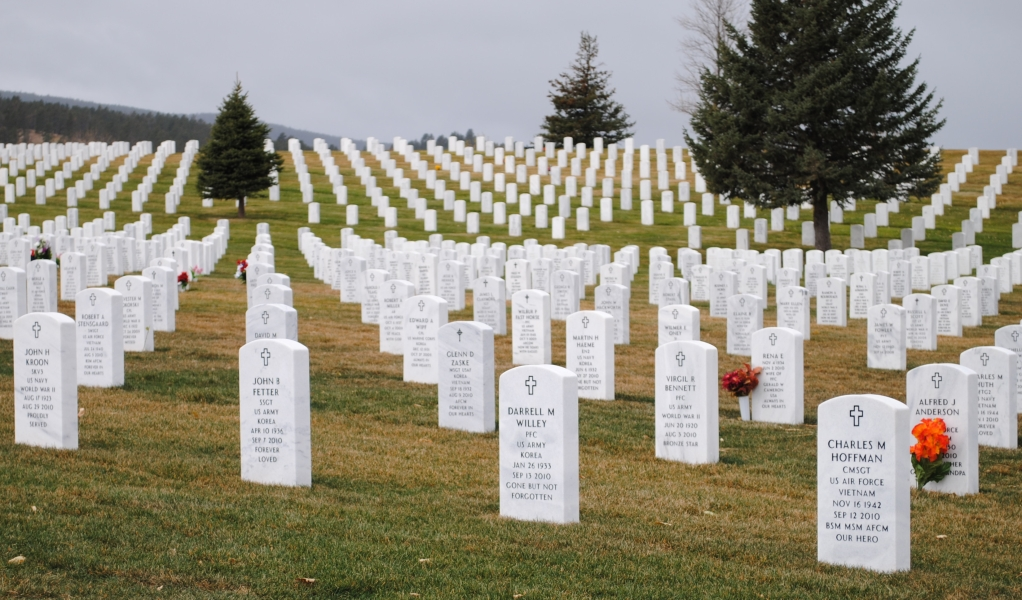
Black Hills National Cemetery

This list of cemeteries in South Dakota includes notable examples of currently operating, historical (closed for new interments), defunct (abandoned or removed) cemeteries, churchyards, columbaria, mausolea, and other formal burial grounds. Several cemeteries of historic and/or architectural value are listed on the National Register of Historic Places (NRHP). It does not include pet cemeteries. This list is sorted by county.

== Bennett ==
- Wounded Knee Cemetery; mass grave from the Wounded Knee Massacre

== Butte ==
- Snoma Finnish Cemetery; NRHP-listed

== Clark ==
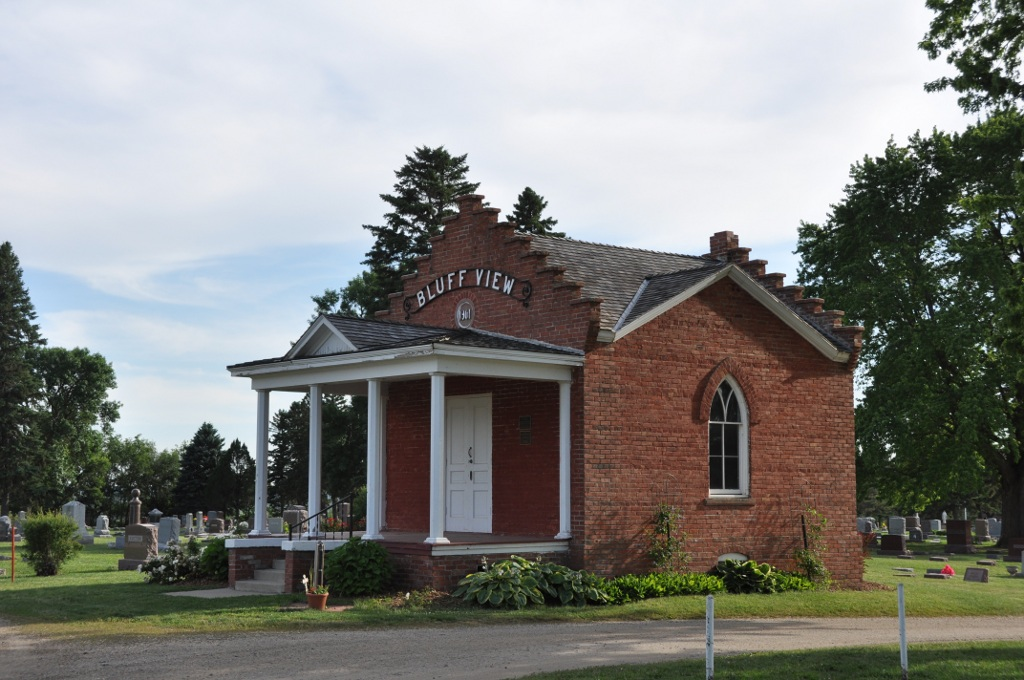
Bluff View Cemetery Chapel

- Bluff View Cemetery, Vermillion; chapel is NRHP-listed

== Codington ==
- Mount Hope Cemetery, Aberdeen; mausoleum is NRHP-listed

== Fall River ==
- Hot Springs National Cemetery, Hot Springs

== Gregory ==
- St. John's Catholic Church and Cemetery, Dallas; NRHP-listed

== Harding ==
- Emmanuel Lutheran Church and Cemetery; NRHP-listed
- Peace Valley Evangelical Church and Cemetery

== Kingsbury ==
- De Smet Cemetery, De Smet; burial place of several members of the Charles Ingalls family

== Lawrence ==
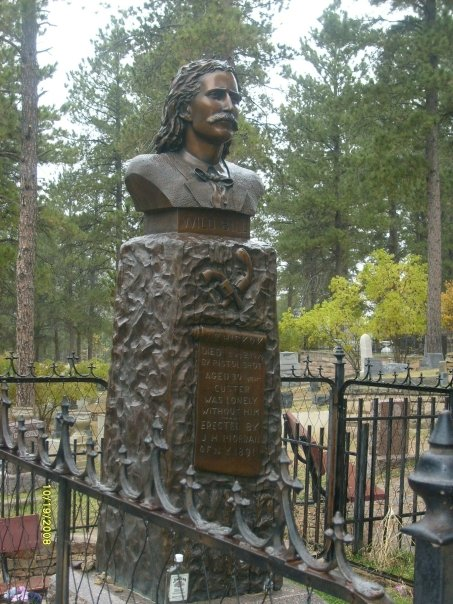
Grave of Wild Bill Hickok, Mount Moriah Cemetery

- Mount Moriah Cemetery, Deadwood; burial place of multiple Wild West figures, including Wild Bill Hickok, Calamity Jane, and Seth Bullock

== Lincoln ==
- Canton Asylum for American Indians Cemetery, Canton; NRHP-listed

== Lyman ==
- Messiah Episcopal Church Cemetery, Lower Brule Indian Reservation; contains Iron Nation's Gravesite, NRHP-listed

== Meade ==
- Black Hills National Cemetery, Sturgis; NRHP-listed
- Fort Meade National Cemetery, Sturgis

== Mellette ==
- Sicangu Akicita Owicahe Tribal Veterans Cemetery, White River

== Minnehaha ==
- Mount Pleasant Cemetery, Sioux Falls; site of NRHP-listed Josephine Martin Glidden Memorial Chapel
- South Dakota Veterans Cemetery, Sioux Falls
- Woodlawn Cemetery

== Moody ==
- First Presbyterian Church and Cemetery, Flandreau; NRHP-listed

== Oglala Lakota ==
- Akicita Owicahe Lakota Freedom Veterans Cemetery, Kyle

== Perkins ==
- Duck Creek Lutheran Church and Cemetery, NRHP-listed

== Roberts ==
- Sisseton-Wahpeton Oyate Veterans Cemetery, Sisseton

== Union ==
- Saint John Cemetery, Beresford
- St. Paul Lutheran Church and Cemetery, Richland; NRHP-listed

== See also ==
- List of cemeteries in the United States
