= Dogie =

Dogie may refer to:

- Dogie Butte, a geographic feature in rural South Dakota
- Akosi Dogie, a Filipino online streamer, gamer, and YouTuber

== See also ==
- "Git Along, Little Dogies", a traditional cowboy ballad
- Git Along Little Dogies, a 1937 Gene Autry film
