= Vessy =

Vessy may refer to:

== People ==
- Robert Vessy (died 1430), English politician and Member of Parliament

== Places ==
- Vessy, a locality within the municipality of Veyrier in the Canton of Geneva, Switzerland

== See also ==
- Vess
- Vessey (disambiguation)
- Vesy
- Vesey
