= Camel Creek =

Stream in Harding County, South Dakota, U.S.

Coordinates: 45°52′48″N 103°34′02″W

Camel Creek is a stream in Harding County, South Dakota.

== History ==
Camel Creek has the name of Andy Camel, an early settler.

== See also ==
- List of rivers of South Dakota
