= Axel Johnson =

Axel Johnson may refer to:

- Axel Johnson Group, a Swedish family-owned company
- Axel Johnson (politician), member of the Wisconsin State Assembly
- Axel Johnson Ranch, ranch near Reva, South Dakota
