= Giannonatti Ranch =

- U.S. National Register of Historic Places
- Location within South Dakota Location within the United States
- Nearest city: Ludlow, South Dakota
- Coordinates: 45°49′27″N 103°15′14″W
- Area: 2 acres (0.81 ha)
- Built: c.1900
- Architectural style: Bungalow/craftsman
- MPS: Harding and Perkins Counties MRA
- NRHP reference No.: 87000546
- Added to NRHP: April 10, 1987

The Giannonatti Ranch, in Harding County, South Dakota near Ludlow, includes 10 structures dating from around 1900. A 2 acres (0.81 ha) portion of the ranch was listed on the National Register of Historic Places in 1987.

It is located on the south side of an east-west section road about 6 miles (9.7 km) east of Ludlow.

Six of the structures are contributing buildings, one is a contributing structure, the rest were deemed not to contribute to the historic character of the property.
