= Thomas Ashcroft Ranch =

- Ashcroft, Thomas, Ranch
- U.S. National Register of Historic Places
- Location within South Dakota Location within the United States
- Nearest city: Buffalo, South Dakota
- Coordinates: 45°40′21″N 103°14′24″W
- Area: 6 acres (2.4 ha)
- Built: c.1910
- Built by: Ashcroft, Thomas
- MPS: Harding and Perkins Counties MRA
- NRHP reference No.: 87000547
- Added to NRHP: April 10, 1987

The Thomas Ashcroft Ranch, in Harding County, South Dakota near Buffalo was listed on the National Register of Historic Places in 1987.

The ranch is located on the floodplain of the South Fork of the Grand River, east-northeast of Buffalo.

Its ranch house was deemed to be "One of the most architecturally impressive houses in Harding County" and is a two-story stone house with a hipped roof and an L-shaped plan. It was built in 1910 of fieldstone from the site, and overlooks the river.

The listing included seven contributing buildings and four contributing structures, all from around 1910, and a couple non-contributing modern structures.
