= John and Daisy May Livingston Ranch =

- Livingston, John and Daisy May, Ranch
- U.S. National Register of Historic Places
- Location within South Dakota Location within the United States
- Nearest city: Sorum, South Dakota
- Coordinates: 45°25′17″N 103°02′01″W
- Area: 4 acres (1.6 ha)
- Built: 1916
- Architectural style: Bungalow/craftsman
- MPS: Harding and Perkins Counties MRA
- NRHP reference No.: 87000542
- Added to NRHP: April 10, 1987

The John and Daisy May Livingston Ranch, in Harding County, South Dakota near Sorum, South Dakota, was listed on the National Register of Historic Places in 1987. The part of the ranch which was listed included two contributing buildings and eight non-contributing ones on 4 acres (1.6 ha). It includes a house built in 1916.

It is located 3.5 miles (5.6 km) east of South Dakota State Highway 79, on the south side of the Sorum Road, about 5 miles (8.0 km)} west of the abandoned town of Sorum.
