= Ludlow Cave =

Archaeological site in South Dakota, United States

- Location: near Ludlow, Harding County, South Dakota, United States
- Depth: 300 feet (91 m)
- Entrances: 1
- Archeological Site No. 39HN1
- U.S. National Register of Historic Places
- MPS: Prehistoric Rock Art of South Dakota MPS
- NRHP reference No.: 94000108
- Added to NRHP: March 7, 1994

Ludlow Cave (SITS 39HN1) is an archaeological site in the North Cave Hills of rural Harding County, South Dakota, United States. It is regarded as a sacred site by several Native American tribes, who have long created rock art inside. The cave was visited by George Armstrong Custer as part of his 1874 Black Hills Expedition and was named for one of his officers, William Ludlow. Much of the original art has been destroyed by modern graffiti.

== Geography ==
Ludlow Cave is located about 4 miles (6.4 km) southwest of Ludlow in the northeastern quarter of section 12 of township 21, range 5 W, in rural Harding County, South Dakota, United States. The largest cave in the county, it is in the northern portion of the Cave Hills, a series of buttes bisected by Bull Creek into the North and South Cave Hills. It is located just inside the boundaries of Custer National Forest.

The cave's one entrance is high on a sandstone cliff face and measures about 20 feet (6.1 m) high. The total depth of the cave is 300 feet (91 m). The main chamber of the cave measures 16 ft (4.9 m) wide and 39 ft (12 m) deep, with a 10 ft (3.0 m) high ceiling.

It is part of the Ludlow Division within the Laramie Formation, which was created during the Late Cretaceous.

== History ==
Ludlow Cave was first discovered and inhabited by various Native American tribes and their ancestors. Some rock art suggests the Cheyenne may have visited the site.

George Armstrong Custer visited the site on July 11, 1874, as part of his Black Hills Expedition through western South Dakota. The group's guide was an Arikara man named Goose. It and the town of Ludlow itself were subsequently named after the expedition's engineering officer, Major William Ludlow.

The first archaeologist to visit the site was George Will, who published his findings in 1909. W.H. Over carried out an excavation in 1920 and uncovered hundreds of artifacts such as stone tools and other lithics, bones, and shell jewelry.

== Mythology ==
Ludlow Cave is a sacred site to multiple Native American peoples, including the Arikara, Hidatsa, Crow, Cheyenne and Assiniboine tribes. Several tribes of the Missouri River area believed Ludlow Cave was a portal through which game, particularly bison, entered from the spirit world to populate the vast herds on the Great Plains.

== Rock art ==
The rock art inside and around Ludlow Cave varies in age from prehistoric to modern. Much of it consists of big game animals like bison. Hoofprint impressions are also located near the site and likely date to 1300–1700 AD. Other depictions are of humans or other animals. Many of these drawings resemble other local petroglyphs, such as that found at a site near Mobridge. Some of the artwork is found outside the cave in the surrounding area, on cliff faces and rocks around the site.

The rock art at Ludlow Cave has suffered heavy damage, and most of the petroglyphs have been destroyed. Modern graffiti, in particular that left by early local pioneers, is the most prominent at the site now. Several members of Custer's 1874 expedition carved their names in and near the cave. Some art was removed from the site by early archaeologists like Will and Over. Will excised two petroglyphs, likely of Cheyenne origin, depicting shields, one containing a thunderbird and the other a humanoid figure; later researchers proposed this figure could be Hetanehao, an important design in Cheyenne mythology that represents masculine power. Over removed at least one petroglyph containing a human face that had fallen from the cave wall prior to his arrival.

== Artifacts ==
During Over's 1920 excavation, his team uncovered various layers of human occupation. Inside, the uppermost layers of soil contained modern deposits—including those from contemporary Native Americans—and animal remains. The lowest level was about 3 feet (0.91 m) below the modern surface and contained traces of fire, animal bones, arrowheads, tools, beads, pipes, pots, woven basketry, and other artifacts. Over recorded at least 300 arrowheads made out of material like flint, agate, quartzite, and chalcedony; some still had the remains of the arrow shafts or fastenings attached. Other stone or bone tools included pipes, awls, and rounded fragments of stone that Over hypothesized might have been game pieces. The excavations also found pendants made of stone and elk tusk, as well as beads carved from seashells and fruit pits. Many of the artifacts Over found are held at the W. H. Over Museum in Vermillion, South Dakota.

Based on the typography of the arrowheads, Over suggested this oldest level might have been resulted from a Rocky Mountains-based tribe, possibly Shoshone, inhabiting the cave temporarily. Archaeologist William Duncan Strong further proposed the artifacts were left by an ancestral group to the Arikara who may have arrived from modern-day Nebraska.

More pottery, charcoal, bone, and stone tools and flakes were found in a rock shelter very close to Ludlow Cave in 1971.

== See also ==
- List of archaeological sites in South Dakota
