= Oliver O. Stokes House =

- U.S. National Register of Historic Places
- Location within South Dakota
- Location: Harding Rd., Harding, South Dakota
- Coordinates: 45.396916°N 103.833285°W
- Area: less than one acre
- Built: 1889
- MPS: Harding and Perkins Counties MRA
- NRHP reference No.: 87000532
- Added to NRHP: April 10, 1987

The Oliver O. Stokes House, in Harding County, South Dakota, in Harding, was built in 1889. It was listed on the National Register of Historic Places in 1987.

It is located on the west side of the only road in Harding, a north-south section road, now known as Harding Road.

The house, built in 1889, was the first frame house built in the county.
