= Vessey House =

Vessey House may refer to:

- Vessey House, alternative name of Caldicott, historic home in Somerset County, Maryland, on the National Register of Historic places
- Robert S. Vessey House, historic house in Wessington Springs, South Dakota, on the National Register of Historic places

== See also ==
- Vessey School, South Dakota
- Vessey (disambiguation)
