= L.W. Shevling Ranch =

- L. W. Shevling Ranch
- U.S. National Register of Historic Places
- Location within South Dakota
- Location: E of Harding in the West Short Pine Hills area, Harding, South Dakota
- Coordinates: 45°23′57″N 103°49′33″W
- Area: 3.5 acres (1.4 ha)
- Built: 1883
- Built by: Shevling, L.W.
- MPS: Harding and Perkins Counties MRA
- NRHP reference No.: 87000537
- Added to NRHP: April 10, 1987

The L.W. Shevling Ranch, in Harding County, South Dakota, dates from 1883. A 3.5 acres (1.4 ha) portion was listed on the National Register of Historic Places in 1987.

It is located east of Harding in the West Short Pine Hills area.

The listing included 12 contributing buildings and two contributing structures. The oldest building, a log structure, is believed to have been built in 1883.
