= South Dakota Veterans Cemetery =

Military cemetery in South Dakota, United States

- Interactive map of South Dakota Veterans Cemetery

Details
- Established: May 31, 2021
- Location: Sioux Falls, South Dakota
- Country: United States
- Coordinates: 43°37′22.37″N 96°40′39.47″W
- Type: Military
- Owned by: South Dakota Department of Veterans Affairs
- Size: 60 acres (24 ha)
- Website: Official website
- Find a Grave: South Dakota Veterans Cemetery

South Dakota Veterans Cemetery is a military cemetery in Sioux Falls, South Dakota, United States, established in 2021 for the interment of the state's veterans and their family members. Owned and maintained by the South Dakota Department of Veterans Affairs (SDDVA), it is the first federally-funded, state-operated veterans cemetery in South Dakota.

== Description ==
South Dakota Veterans Cemetery is located north of Sioux Falls, South Dakota, at the corner of Slip Up Creek Road (County Road 317) and 477th Avenue. It is next to Slip-up Creek. Spanning over 60 acres (24 ha), it has the capacity for over 28,000 burials. At opening, the cemetery estimated it would receive 270 burials per year.

It is the first state-owned and federally-funded veterans cemetery in South Dakota. Veterans can be interred at no cost and have the choice between a typical grave or interment in a columbarium. Spouses or dependents of veterans can also be interred for a fee.

== History ==
Prior to the establishment of the South Dakota Veterans Cemetery, no veterans cemetery for non-tribal residents (Note: Three other veterans cemeteries for Native American tribal members were opened in the 2010s: one on the Pine Ridge Indian Reservation, one in White River, and one on the Lake Traverse Indian Reservation.) existed in South Dakota's East River region, and the closest veterans cemeteries were either Black Hills National Cemetery in Sturgis in West River—the only national cemetery in the state still accepting new burials—or Fort Snelling National Cemetery in Stillwater, Minnesota. By the late 2010s, an estimated 40,000 to 50,000 veterans lived in East River. The South Dakota Veterans Council began campaigning for a new cemetery to be built that would be more accessible for them.

In 2018, state legislators Jim Stalzer and Larry Zikmund introduced legislation to establish a state veterans cemetery in East River and to apply for federal aid to do so. On June 28, U.S. Representative Kristi Noem and U.S. Senators John Thune and Mike Rounds wrote a joint letter of support to the United States Department of Veterans Affairs (VA)'s Veterans Cemetery Grant Program. Later that year, the VA agreed to allocate $6 million in federal funding, and the state itself allocated $600,000 for the project. The land for the cemetery was donated by the City of Sioux Falls, totalling 60 acres (24 ha). This land was part of a more than 600-acre (240 ha) undeveloped parcel, which had previously been leased out to farmers or was otherwise undisturbed.

A groundbreaking ceremony was held on September 9, 2019. The first phase of construction provided space for 2,300 interments across 12.9 acres (5.2 ha) and included additional space for cremains and memorial markers.

The official opening and dedication ceremony was held on May 31, 2021 (Memorial Day). Lieutenant Governor Larry Rhoden, himself a veteran; state representative Dusty Johnson; Greg Whitlock, the SDDVA secretary; and Terry Paulsen, president of the South Dakota Veterans Council, spoke at the event. An estimated 500 to 600 people, including active and retired military service members and their families, attended the ceremony. The first burials were interred on June 4, 2021.

On November 11, 2022 (Veterans Day), the cemetery unveiled a set of bronze eagle statues, titled Guardians, to be installed at the cemetery's entrance gate. The statues were created by local sculptor Jurek Jakowicz.

== See also ==
- List of cemeteries in South Dakota
