= Sicangu Akicita Owicahe Tribal Veterans Cemetery =

Tribal veterans cemetery in South Dakota

Details
- Established: May 27, 2013
- Location: 27404 U.S. Highway 83, White River, South Dakota
- Country: United States
- Coordinates: 43°25′52.4″N 100°44′15.4″W
- Type: Tribal veterans cemetery
- Owned by: Rosebud Sioux Tribe
- Size: 74 acres (30 ha)
- Find a Grave: Sicangu Akicita Owicahe Tribal Veterans Cemetery

Sicangu Akicita Owicahe Tribal Veterans Cemetery, also known as the Rosebud Sioux Tribe Veterans Cemetery, located near White River in Mellette County, South Dakota, United States, is the official cemetery for veterans belonging to the Rosebud Sioux Tribe. Opened in 2013 and funded by a grant from the United States Department of Veterans Affairs (VA), it was one of the first tribal veterans cemeteries in the country.

== History ==
Since 2006, the United States Department of Veterans Affairs (VA) has been authorized to grant funding for veterans cemeteries to Native American tribal governments using its Veterans Cemetery Grants Program. The Rosebud Sioux Tribe Veterans Department applied for and received $6,948,365 from the VA, the first such grant to be awarded to a tribal government. The funds covered the complete cost of the purchase and development of the cemetery.

The groundbreaking ceremony was held on September 19, 2011, and included ceremonies performed by the Red Leaf Singers, Sicangu Lakota Warriors, and the Wild Horse Butte Tokala. The cemetery officially opened on Memorial Day 2013.

In 2021, the remains of six Rosebud Sioux children who died and were buried at the Carlisle Indian Industrial School in Carlisle, Pennsylvania, in the 19th century, were reinterred at the cemetery. Their remains were wrapped in buffalo hides before being interred.

== Description ==
The cemetery sits on a 74-acre (30 ha) plot of land on the Rosebud Indian Reservation in Mellette County, South Dakota, at 27404 U.S. Route 83 between White River and Mission.

Tipis feature prominently in the architecture of the cemetery, including the entrance gate, administration building, and committal shelter. The cemetery is shaped to resemble a turtle, an important symbol in Lakota religion. Unlike other veterans cemeteries, which contain a plaque inscribed with the Gettysburg Address, the plaque at Sicangu features a quote from Crazy Horse: "My lands are where my relatives lie buried".

The initial development prepared 14.4 acres (5.8 ha) of the total cemetery property and included 600 burial plots, 544 spots to inter cremated remains, and 32 niches in a columbarium.

Tribe members eligible for burial in the cemetery include those who served in the United States Armed Forces and received a qualifying discharge, and spouses and dependent children of those veterans.

== See also ==
- List of cemeteries in South Dakota
