= Redig =

Redig may refer to:

== People ==
- Deoclecio Redig de Campos (1905-1989), Brazilian art historian
- Ida Redig (born 1987), Swedish singer and actress
- Olavo Redig de Campos (1906–1984), Brazilian architect

== Places ==
- Redig, South Dakota, United States
