= St. Paul Lutheran Church and Cemetery (Union County, South Dakota) =

Historic church in Union County, South Dakota

- U.S. National Register of Historic Places
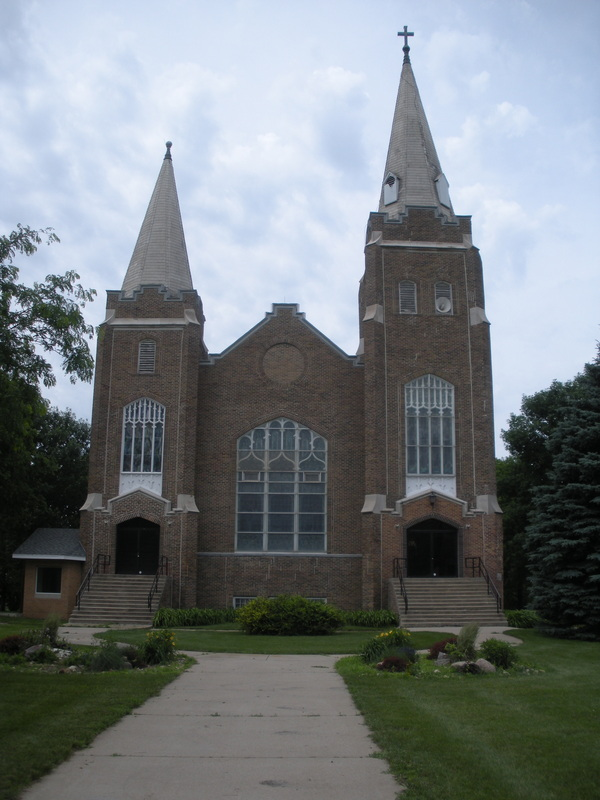
- St. Paul Lutheran

- Location within South Dakota Location within the United States
- Location of St. Paul Lutheran Church and Cemetery
- Location: 31903 475th Ave. Brule Township, Union County, South Dakota, U.S.
- Nearest city: Richland
- Coordinates: 42.7643202°N 96.708176°W
- Built: 1922
- Architect: Peter Oliver Moe
- Architectural style: Late Gothic Revival; Collegiate Gothic
- Website: Official website
- NRHP reference No.: 100002103
- Added to NRHP: February 20, 2018

St. Paul Lutheran Church and Cemetery is a historic Lutheran church and adjoining cemetery located in Brule Township, rural Union County, South Dakota. It is located near Richland and about 5 miles (8.0 km) northwest of Elk Point. First built in 1867, it was the first Norwegian Lutheran church in Dakota Territory. The cemetery dates to 1869 and the current church building was finished in 1922. The site was listed on the National Register of Historic Places on February 20, 2018, for its historic, religious, and architectural significance.

== History ==
The establishment of St. Paul Lutheran Church grew out of the first Lutheran movement in Dakota Territory. The first Lutheran minister, Abraham Jacobson, arrived from Iowa in 1861, and the first official district was established in 1863 as the Norwegian Evangelical Lutheran Church of Dakota Territory. On August 12 of that year, 15 Norwegian settlers founded the Norwegian Evangelical Lutheran Church by Brule Creek. The district was divided into three parishes in 1866; Brule Creek parish was renamed first to Evangelical Lutheran Church by Brule Creek, and then finally to St. Paul Evangelical Lutheran Congregation in Dakota on November 15, 1867.

The church site was chosen during an expedition led by Kjel P. Ronne. Ronne and two other men set out from Vermillion and travelled north as far as Sioux Falls before turning back south. The site near the convergence of Brule Creek with the Missouri River was chosen due to its landmark location and proximity to a natural wood for timber.

The first church building sat on the east side of 475th Avenue. Construction on the log structure began in 1867 and concluded in 1868. In 1869, the cemetery was established around the building. Several former pastors of the church are buried there, and a monument to the first church site was erected in 1938. John N. Nesse, St. Paul's first pastor, built the first parsonage on his personal property between 1869 and 1870, about 0.75 miles (1.21 km) south of the church site. By 1877, a new church building was being constructed where the current church now sits. The Lutheran parish was incorporated in 1878. The second church building was dedicated in 1881. The church itself built a new parsonage in 1891, which was replaced in 1947. All services were first conducted in Norwegian, with English being introduced later; Norwegian language services were discontinued in 1923.

The area's Lutheran congregation grew rapidly, and a second church building, the North St. Paul Church, had to be constructed to accommodate the parishioners. It was built in 1893 about 6 miles (9.7 km) northeast of the main church, North St. Paul Church operated until 1932. St. Paul counted 450 parishioners in 1919, and by that time, it had again outgrown its two sites.

Peter Oliver Moe, a Norwegian-American architect from Minneapolis, was hired to design a new church building. Minneapolis-based contractor R. S. Billingsley was hired to oversee construction. Construction officially commenced on September 26, 1920, with the installment of the cornerstone, and was complete by July 1922. The total construction cost was $85,000; its pipe organ alone cost $5,000. August Klagstad, a Norwegian-born artist, painted the altar piece for the church; it is one of about 1,000 such pieces painted by Klagstad in Norwegian American churches.

The church purchased 158 acres (64 ha) of farmland to the south of the property in 1960, which is used to fundraise for the church. The church hosts an annual lutefisk dinner.

== Architecture ==
=== Church ===
Moe incorporated elements of Late Gothic Revival, particularly Collegiate Gothic, architecture into his church design. It is two stories tall and constructed of brick. A raised basement sits underneath the church. Its front facade faces east, towards 475th Avenue, and contains two large towers on either corner, which both have entrance doors. Its roof is a steep-pitched gable constructed from sheet metal, topped with a parapet. The church contains several stained-glass windows original to the 1922 construction.

=== Cemetery ===
St. Paul Cemetery was established in 1869. Its wrought-iron and brick gate was built in 1930, and it is surrounded by a chain link and wire fence. There are about 25 rows of graves running from north to south, with a single east–west pathway bisecting the cemetery. A stone boulder near the gate contains a two plaques: one commemorating the site of the first church, and another listing the 1863 founding members.

== Pastors ==
An incomplete list of former pastors of St. Paul Lutheran Church is as follows:

- 1868–1881: John Nesse, first resident pastor (Note: This pastor is buried in St. Paul Cemetery.)
- 1896–1918: R. J. Reinertsen, longest-serving pastor
- 1958–1959: Thomas A. Knudson (interim)
- 1973–1986: Arthur Erickson

== See also ==
- List of cemeteries in South Dakota
- Norwegian Americans
