= Vesey =

Vesey is an English surname. Notable people with the surname include:

- Agmondisham Vesey (1677–1739) Irish landowner and politician
- Agmondesham Vesey (1708–85) Irish politician and amateur architect
- Denmark Vesey (c. 1767–1822), American rebel slave
- Elizabeth Vesey (1715–1791), English socialite and writer
- Gerald Vesey (1832–1915), English clergyman
- Ivo Vesey (1876–1975), British Army officer
- Jim Vesey (born 1965), American ice hockey player
- Jimmy Vesey (born 1993), American ice hockey player
- John Vesey (c. 1462–1554), English bishop
- John Vesey-Brown (1899–1976), English first-class cricketer, British Army officer and director of Mobil Oil Company
- Muschamp Vesey (1688–1762), Irish Anglican priest
- Thomas Vesey Dawson (1819–1854), Irish Whig politician and army officer
- William Vesey (1674–1746), American clergyman

== See also ==
- Sutton Vesey (ward), Sutton Coldfield, Birmingham
- Vesey Street (Manhattan)
- de Vesci and Viscount de Vesci
