= Little Missouri Bank Building =

- U.S. National Register of Historic Places
- Location within South Dakota Location within the United States
- Location: Main St., Camp Crook, South Dakota
- Coordinates: 45°33′01″N 103°58′28″W
- Area: less than one acre
- Built: 1918
- MPS: Harding and Perkins Counties MRA
- NRHP reference No.: 87000536
- Added to NRHP: April 10, 1987

The Little Missouri Bank Building, located on the northwest corner of Main Street and First Street in Camp Crook, South Dakota, was built in 1918. It was listed on the National Register of Historic Places in 1987.

It has a flat roof and a false front. In 1987 it was deemed "architecturally significant to rural Harding County as one of the best preserved bank buildings in the county. In the town of Camp Crook, the Little Missouri Bank was the only bank which operated in the community. The building is of local importance as it is the most impressive commercial structure still standing in Camp Crook."

The bank was established in 1902 and moved to this building in 1918.

It was later used as the Camp Crook General Store.
