= Emmanuel Lutheran Church and Cemetery =

Historic site in Harding County, South Dakota, US

- U.S. National Register of Historic Places
- Location within South Dakota Location within the United States
- Nearest city: Ralph, South Dakota
- Coordinates: 45°50′5″N 103°11′28″W
- Area: less than one acre
- Built: 1900
- Architectural style: Rural Gothic
- MPS: Harding and Perkins Counties MRA
- NRHP reference No.: 87000531
- Added to NRHP: April 10, 1987

Emmanuel Lutheran Church and Cemetery is a historic church located near Ralph in Harding County, South Dakota. It was built in 1900 and was added to the National Register of Historic Places in 1987.
