= Ladner, South Dakota =

Unincorporated community in South Dakota, U.S.

Coordinates: 45°49′38″N 103°43′41″W

Ladner is an unincorporated community in Harding County, in the U.S. state of South Dakota.

== History ==
Ladner was laid out in 1911. While the community is most likely named after a pioneer family, it has also been said to have been named after a beer brand used by some of the early residents. A post office called Ladner was established in 1910 and remained in operation until 1965.
