= W. H. Over Museum =

Oldest museum in South Dakota, US

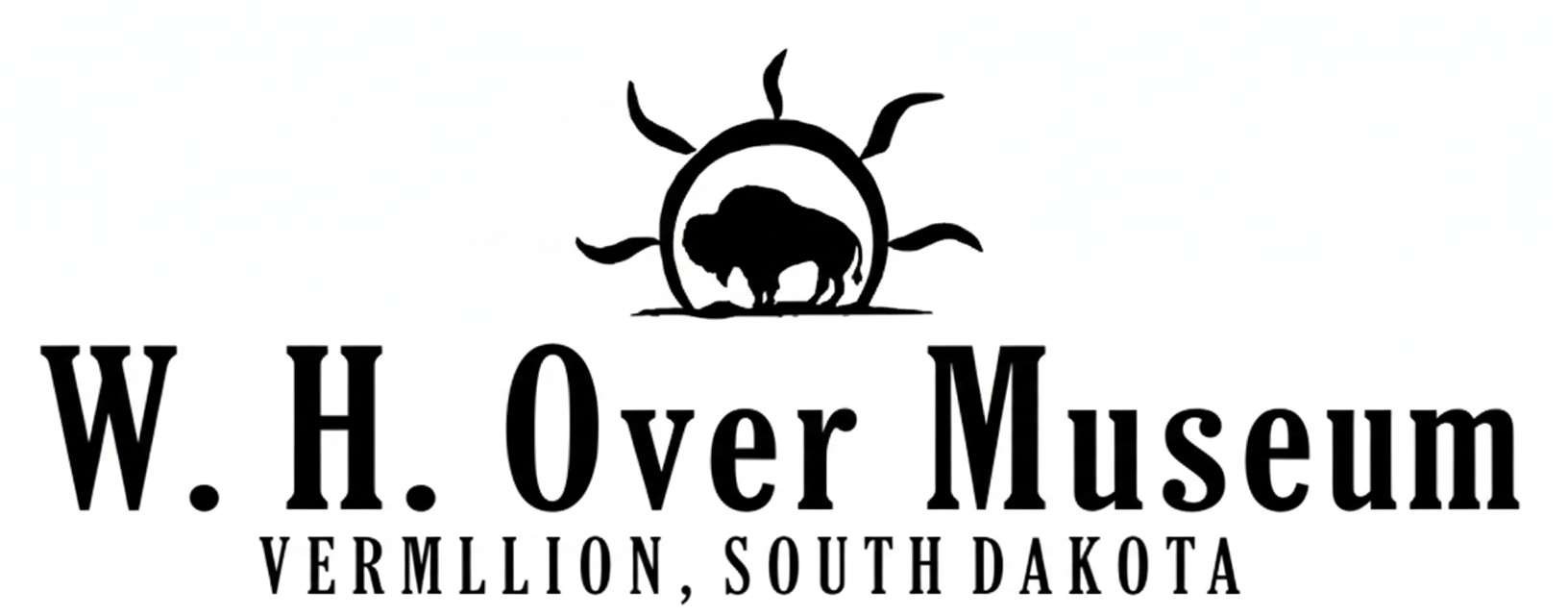

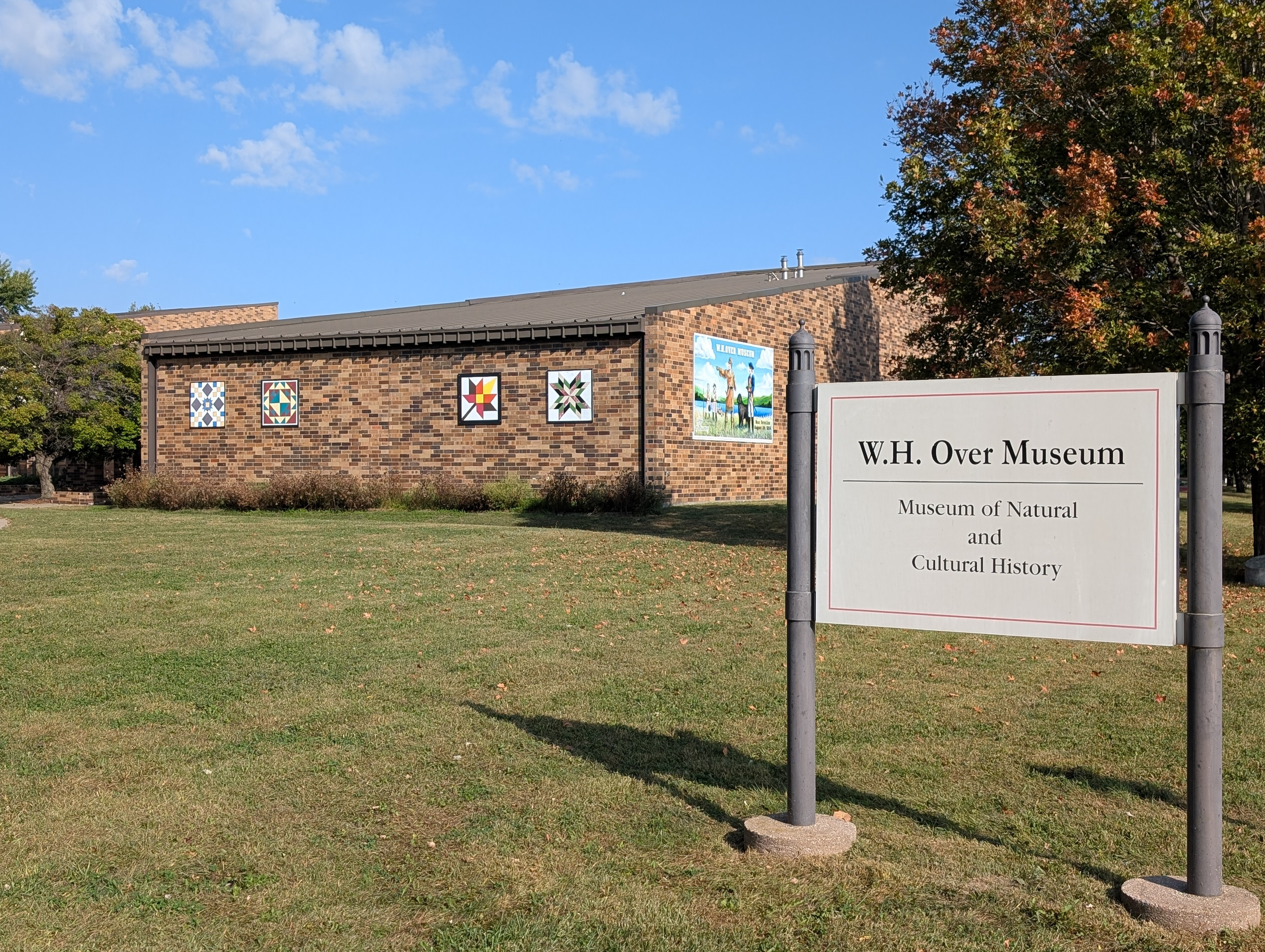
- The W. H. Over Museum building in Vermillion
- Established: 1883
- Location: 1110 N. University Street; Vermillion, South Dakota, U.S.
- Coordinates: 42.7918°N 96.9250°W
- Type: Natural and cultural history
- Collection size: Over 80,000 objects
- Board President: Lynn Muller
- Public transit access: Vermillion Public Transit
- Website: whovermuseum.org

The W. H. Over Museum, in Vermillion, South Dakota is the oldest museum in the state of South Dakota. Established in 1883, its collection contains over 80,000 items relating to the natural and cultural history of South Dakota and the Northern Plains.

The museum is located on the campus of the University of South Dakota but is operated as a private 501(c)(3) non-profit organization, the Friends of the W. H. Over Museum.

== History ==
=== Founding and Early Years (1883–1913) ===
The museum was founded in 1883 by the Board of Regents as the University Museum at the University of South Dakota. It began as a single display case of natural science specimens housed in University Hall (now Old Main). In 1893, a fire destroyed the building and much of the early collection; only materials on exhibit at the World's Fair and some rocks and minerals survived. The South Dakota Geological Survey operated the museum from 1902 until 1927.

=== W. H. Over Era (1913–1948) ===
In 1913, William Henry Over was hired as Assistant Curator. At the time, many of the Survey's collected specimens remained in shipping boxes, and Over was tasked with formally cataloging and exhibiting them for public viewing. He became Curator in 1927 and held the position until his retirement in 1948, after 35 years of service. In 1949, the Board of Regents renamed the museum in his honor.

=== Transition and New Building (1960s–1996) ===
The Friends of the W. H. Over Museum, a non-profit support organization, was formed in the late 1960s, with Dorothy Neuhaus as an instrumental figure. During this period, the museum was housed in the university's former Carnegie Library building.

In 1984, the museum's collections were moved into storage for four years after the university allocated the Carnegie building to the Shrine to Music Museum (now the National Music Museum). The "Friends of the W. H. Over Museum" organization, led by advocates like Neuhaus, spearheaded a major fundraising campaign for a new, dedicated facility. Neuhaus and other supporters famously marched in the Dakota Day Parade with shovels to raise awareness for the new building project. The current 29,200-square-foot building was completed and opened in 1988.

=== Post-State Funding (1996–Present) ===
In 1996, the State of South Dakota withdrew all financial support for the museum. The "Friends of the W. H. Over Museum" assumed full responsibility for its operations and funding. Dorothy Neuhaus helped lead the museum through this critical transition, serving as Board President (1996–1998), Acting Director (1996–2000), and Director (2001–2005). During her tenure as director, she oversaw the opening of the Spirit Mound Learning Center and the museum's programming for the Lewis and Clark Bicentennial Celebration.

== Notable people ==
=== William Henry Over ===
William Henry Over (1866–1956) was a self-educated naturalist with an eighth-grade education who homesteaded in South Dakota before joining the museum in 1913. He conducted extensive investigations of fossil deposits and archeological sites across the state, authoring numerous books, including Birds of South Dakota (1921), Amphibians and Reptiles of South Dakota (1923), and Flora of South Dakota (1932).

He is credited with discovering several new fossil species that were named in his honor, including a snail (Pisidium overi), a clam (Anodonta dakota), and a fossil crab (Dakotacancer overana). In 1936, the University of South Dakota awarded Over an honorary Doctor of Science degree in recognition of his scholarly contributions. Over is also noted for his 1920 excavation of the Ludlow Cave, a significant archaeological site in South Dakota. His last publication was the Life History of Sitting Bull, in 1950.

=== Dorothy Neuhaus ===
Dorothy Neuhaus (c. 1924–2025) was a key figure in the museum's modern history. She was instrumental in founding the "Friends of the W. H. Over Museum" organization in the late 1960s and established its gift shop. Neuhaus was a "driving force" in the campaign to fund and build the new museum facility in the 1980s after it lost its space in the Carnegie Library. Following the loss of state funding in 1996, she served as Board President (1996–1998), Acting Director (1996–2000), and ultimately Museum Director (2001–2005). For her positive relationship with Indigenous people, she was named a "Tribal Elder."

== Collections and Exhibits ==
The museum's galleries focus on the natural and cultural history of South Dakota.

=== Permanent Exhibits ===
- South Dakota: Land and People: Covers the natural history of the region, from fossils of the Cretaceous Period to contemporary fauna. It includes dioramas of early tribal cultures and the Heubaum collection of taxidermy mounts.
- Lakota Family Camp: A large diorama depicting the prairie life of a Lakota family in the 20th century. It features a full-size canvas tipi, clothing, and tools, primarily from the David C. Clark Memorial Collection, which was sourced from the family of Father David Clark, an Episcopalian minister to the Sioux on the Lower Brule Reservation. The backdrop is a mural painted by noted Lakota artist Robert Penn.
- Pioneer Life: Exhibits in the West Exhibit Hall focus on the homesteading era. Highlights include the original Mydland Claim Shanty, an 8x10-foot shanty built in 1882 by Norwegian ship-carpenter Gabriel Mydland. Nine family members lived in the shanty and an adjoining dugout for a year on their homestead near Lake Preston. It was donated by his grandson, Gordon Mydland. The exhibit also features a recreated 1910 Schoolroom.
- A Time to Remember: This gallery contains pioneer objects from the 1880–1920 immigration period. Its main attraction is a fully restored 1912 Moline Dreadnought '35' automobile. The car was donated by Elwood Olsen, restored by the Friends of the W. H. Over Museum, and sold for $1,700 in 1912.
- Agriculture Exhibit: Features historic farming tools and research on the context of "East River" agriculture in South Dakota.
- Hero the Elephant: The museum displays the full skeleton of Hero, a circus elephant who was tragically killed in Elkton, South Dakota, in 1916 after being spooked during a parade.
- Lewis & Clark - Spirit Mound Learning Center: Features animals, artifacts, and interactive displays related to the Lewis and Clark Expedition's time in the region, which was a project completed for the 2004 bicentennial.
- Stanley J. Morrow Photographs: The Hall Gallery displays reproductions of photos by Stanley J. Morrow, who documented the Dakota Territory (1866–1882). The museum's "Friends of the W. H. Over Museum" organization funded the framing of the priceless collection.
- Other Collections: The museum also holds a collection of historic firearms, an Egyptian mummy acquired by Over in 1950, a large collection of Kodak cameras, and an antique 1888 view camera that was restored to working condition in 2019.

=== Outdoor Exhibits ===
- Heritage Garden: The grounds surrounding the museum feature a Heritage Garden with a variety of trees, shrubs, and plants that serve as a living extension of the natural history exhibits inside.

=== Temporary and Rotating Exhibits ===
In addition to its permanent galleries, the museum features temporary and rotating exhibits. In November 2025, the museum opened its "Celebrating Veterans Exhibit" in Sletwold Hall, curated by Dr. Lynn Muller. The exhibit features displays on conflicts from the Civil War to the Gulf War, including memorabilia from the battleship South Dakota and the Minuteman missile system.

== Operations ==
The museum is governed by the Friends of the W. H. Over Museum, a non-profit board of directors. As of 2023–2024, the board's officers include Lynn Muller (President), David Moen (First Vice President), Calvin Brink (Second Vice President), William Ranney (Treasurer), and Maxine Johnson (Secretary). Board President Dr. Lynn Muller also serves as the curator of the museum's Photo Center and led the 2019 restoration of an 1888 view camera found in the collection.

The museum's mission is to "collect, preserve, document, exhibit, research, study and interpret objects relating to natural and cultural history, primarily of South Dakota." Admission is free.

The museum actively collaborates with the University of South Dakota. Students in classes such as "Museum Techniques" have curated exhibits on topics like the Dust Bowl, World War I, and assisted in documenting the museum's Egyptian mummy. The museum also functions as a community hub, hosting annual public events such as the "Chilli Blues" fundraiser, an Annual Christmas Festival, and "Nature Play" activities for Vermillion Earth Days.

The museum includes a Discovery Room with hands-on activities for children and a gift shop. The gift shop sells a variety of items, including handcrafted jewelry, quilts, and supplies from local and Native American artisans. The museum also co-publishes a joint newsletter with the Clay County Historical Society and the Clay County Historic Preservation Commission.

== See also ==
- Paleontology in South Dakota
- Oscar Howe
- National Music Museum (United States)
