= Vessey =

Vessey may refer to:

- Vessey, Manche, French commune

== People ==
- Denmark Vessey (born 1984), American rapper and record producer
- John William Vessey, Jr. (1922–2016), United States Army general
- Maggie Vessey (born 1981), American middle-distance runner
- Robert S. Vessey (1858–1929), American politician
- Robert Vessey (Canadian politician) (born 1961), Canadian politician
- Tricia Vessey (born 1972), American actress
- Tony Vessey (born 1961), English footballer

== See also ==
- Vessey House (disambiguation)
