= Bullock, South Dakota =

Coordinates: 45°41′25″N 103°52′22″W

Bullock is a ghost town in Harding County, in the U.S. state of South Dakota.

== History ==
Bullock was laid out in 1911, and named in honor of Seth Bullock, a Western sheriff. A post office called Bullock was established in 1911, and remained in operation until 1957. It was founded on the homestead of Knute Boresen Grasby.
