= Karinen, South Dakota =

Coordinates: 45°54′02″N 103°40′30″W

Karinen is an extinct town in Harding County, in the U.S. state of South Dakota. The GNIS classifies it as a populated place.

== History ==
A post office called Karinen was established in 1907, and remained in operation until 1953. The town has the name of the local Karinen family.
