= Fowler Hotel =

- U.S. National Register of Historic Places
- Location: 103 1st St., Buffalo, South Dakota
- Coordinates: 45°34′54″N 103°32′46″W
- Area: less than one acre
- Built: 1936
- Architectural style: Bungalow/craftsman, Commercial
- NRHP reference No.: 08000886
- Added to NRHP: September 12, 2008

Fowler Hotel, at 103 1st St. SW in 57720, Buffalo, South Dakota, was built in 1936. It was listed on the National Register of Historic Places in 2008.

It has also been known as Hann Hotel. It is located on a corner of U.S. Highway 85, the main street through town. It is a two-story brick L-shaped building. It has 34 rooms each with one queen bed.
