= Peace Valley Evangelical Church and Cemetery =

Historic church in South Dakota, United States

- U.S. National Register of Historic Places
- Location within South Dakota Location within the United States
- Nearest city: Ralph, South Dakota
- Coordinates: 45°50′12″N 102°58′59″W
- Area: 2 acres (0.81 ha)
- Built: c. 1900
- Architectural style: Rural Gothic
- MPS: Harding and Perkins Counties MRA
- NRHP reference No.: 87000550
- Added to NRHP: April 10, 1987

Peace Valley Evangelical Church and Cemetery is a historic church in Harding County, South Dakota. It was built in a Gothic style in c. 1900 and was added to the National Register of Historic Places in 1987.

It is located on the east side of South Dakota Highway 79 about eight miles northwest of Ralph, South Dakota.
