= Tony Vessey =

English footballer

Personal information
- Full name: Anthony William Vessey
- Date of birth: 28 November 1961 (age 64)
- Place of birth: Derby, England
- Height: 6 ft 0 in (1.83 m)
- Position: Full-back

Youth career
- –1978: Derby Boys
- 1978–1981: Brighton & Hove Albion

Senior career*
| Years | Team | Apps | (Gls) |
| 1981–1982 | Brighton & Hove Albion | 1 | (0) |
| 1982 | Vasalund | | |
| 1982–1983 | Steyning Town | | |
| 1983–1987 | Worthing | | |
| 1987–19?? | Crawley Town | | |
- Burgess Hill Town
| Total | | 1 | (0) |

Managerial career
- 1994–1995: Crawley Town
- * Club domestic league appearances and goals

Anthony William Vessey (born 28 November 1961) is an English former footballer who played as a full-back. He started his career at Brighton & Hove Albion, but made just one appearance and was released in 1982. He subsequently played for Vasalund in Sweden, and in non-league football with Steyning Town, Worthing, Crawley Town and Burgess Hill Town. Vessey also had a spell as player-manager at Crawley Town.

== Career ==
Vessey was born in Derby and played youth football for Derby Boys before joining Brighton & Hove Albion as an apprentice in 1978. He signed a professional contract with the club in 1979, made his debut for Brighton against Coventry City on 7 March 1981, before being released at the end of the following season, having only made 1 appearance for the club.

He subsequently joined Vasalund in Sweden, before spells at Steyning Town and Worthing, spending four years at the latter. He joined Crawley Town in 1987, and became club captain. He was part of the Crawley Town team that reached the third round of the FA Cup for the first time in the 1991–92 season, before being eliminated by Vessy's former club Brighton & Hove Albion. He became player-manager in 1994, though went back to playing duties the following year due to work commitments. He finished his playing career with a spell at Burgess Hill Town.

Following his retirement, he worked as an independent financial advisor for Hunter Hammond in Hove. In 2014, he returned to Crawley Town as the summariser for home matches for their streaming service, Reds Player.
