= Redig, South Dakota =

- Unincorporated community
- Location within South Dakota Location within the United States
- Coordinates: 45°16′16″N 103°32′52″W
- Country: United States
- State: South Dakota
- County: Harding
- Time zone: UTC-6 (Central (CST))
  - Summer (DST): UTC-5 (CDT)
- ZIP codes: 57776

Redig is an unincorporated community in Harding County, South Dakota, United States. Although not tracked by the Census Bureau, Redig has been assigned the ZIP code of 57776.

Centrally located between Buffalo and Belle Fourche on state highway 85, the town is nearly 22 miles from the nearest grocery store and gas station. As of 2018, there are a few occupied mobile homes, a general store, and post office. The population is estimated to be near 5. The community has the name of the Redig brothers, local ranchers.
