= Dogie Butte =

Mountain in South Dakota, United States

- Location within South Dakota

Highest point
- Elevation: 3,248 ft (990 m)
- Coordinates: 45°52′57″N 103°46′47″W

Geography
- Location: Harding County, South Dakota

Dogie Butte is a summit in Harding County, South Dakota, in the United States. With an elevation of 3,248 feet (990 m), Dogie Butte is the 246th highest summit in the state of South Dakota.
