= Akosi Dogie =

Filipino gamer

Personal information
- Born: Naser Ignacio Mollazehi
- Nationality: Filipino

Career information
- Game: Mobile Legends: Bang Bang; Honor of Kings
- Roles: Content creator; coach; player
- Occupations: Online streamer; YouTuber; gamer; esports executive
- Years active: 2017–present

TikTok information
- Page: @akosidogie37
- Followers: 2.2 million

YouTube information
- Channel: Akosi Dogie
- Years active: 2005–present
- Subscribers: 6.71 million
- Views: 1.2 billion
- Last updated: July 17, 2026

Naser "Setsuna" Ignacio Mollazehi, professionally known as Akosi Dogie or simply Dogie, is a Filipino online streamer, gamer, and YouTuber.

Ignacio began his career as a gaming content creator, producing content about Mobile Legends: Bang Bang, before expanding into competitive esports as a coach, manager, team owner, and player. He coached Aether Main to the championship in the inaugural season of the Mobile Legends: Bang Bang Professional League Philippines (MPL Philippines), later became head coach and co-owner of Nexplay Esports, and subsequently joined TNC Pro Team as a partner. In 2020, Ignacio won both the Streamer of the Year and the overall SEA Content Creator of the Year awards at the inaugural SuperGamerFest Awards.

== Life and career ==
=== Early life ===
Naser Ignacio Mollazehi spent part of his childhood in the Philippines. He moved to Belgium with his mother when he was ten years old. During his studies overseas, he gained an interest in video games that would form one of his major hobbies. During this period, he worked part-time at a clothing store and a Japanese restaurant while attending school.

After graduating, Ignacio took a six-month break while dealing with depression before pursuing a career in online content creation. He initially streamed on several platforms with little success before eventually moving to Facebook. His online alias "Akosi Dogie", was inspired by his pet dog after he experimented with the FaceRig application, which allowed him to use a dog avatar during his broadcasts.

=== Streaming career ===
Ignacio began creating Mobile Legends: Bang Bang content on Facebook and YouTube, where he built a large following as a gaming content creator. In 2019, Ignacio said his online popularity grew after a public exchange with internet personality Xander Ford over Mobile Legends: Bang Bang. Ford challenged Ignacio to a five-on-five match after Ignacio reacted to one of his gameplay videos. According to Ignacio, the match drew about 200,000 concurrent viewers on Facebook, which led to a sharp increase in his audience and subscribers.

In December 2020, Ignacio received the Streamer of the Year award at the inaugural SuperGamerFest Awards. He was also named the overall SEA Content Creator of the Year, the event's highest individual recognition, after emerging as the top recipient among the winners of the streaming and video creator categories.

In 2025, Ignacio and fellow Filipino gaming creator Leomiho were featured as limited-edition Flowborn accessories in the mobile game Honor of Kings. Players could unlock Ignacio's dog-themed cosmetic item during a special in-game event held from September to October. He has also appeared in promotional campaigns for Mobile Legends: Bang Bang, including the 515 E-Party event, where he participated in an exhibition rap battle alongside actress Andrea Brillantes.

=== Esports career ===
Ignacio entered the competitive Mobile Legends: Bang Bang scene during the inaugural season of the Mobile Legends: Bang Bang Professional League Philippines (MPL Philippines) in 2018. He served as head coach of Aether Main, which won the league's first championship after defeating Digital Devils Pro Gaming in the grand finals. Aside from coaching, Ignacio also competed professionally. He played for HappyFeet Emperors in the inaugural season of The Nationals before joining Nexplay Esports when the organization entered MPL Philippines in season six. He served as the team's head coach during seasons six and seven before returning to the roster as a player for Nexplay EVOS in season eight.

In 2019, Nexplay Esports announced Ignacio's acquisition as one of the organization's professional talents. Under the partnership, his teams and content creation activities became part of Nexplay's expanding esports and streaming operations. He eventually joined the management of the team, being one of the co-owners of the organization and stayed there for five years before leaving in 2023. Ignacio played a role in developing several prominent MPL Philippines players. He assembled the Nexplay lineup featuring John Paul "H2WO" Salonga, Tristan "Yawi" Cabrera, and Renejay Barcarse, who later became known collectively as Nexplay's "Big Three".

In 2021, Ignacio announced that he would form a team for the Collegiate Center for Esports (CCE), saying he wanted to provide aspiring collegiate players with opportunities to pursue both esports and higher education. He pledged to provide a boot camp, coaching staff, equipment, and academic support for recruited players.

In 2023, Ignacio was selected first overall by Barangay Ginebra San Miguel in 2023 during the first ever PBA Esports Bakbakan Draft, marking him as the very first overall pick in the history of the league.

In 2025, Ignacio became a partner of TNC Pro Team ahead of MPL Philippines Season 15. During the season, Ignacio implemented a reward scheme for the performance of his players after their wins.

== Controversies ==
In August 2020, Ignacio drew criticism after making a joking comment about sexual assault on social media in response to discussions surrounding allegations of misconduct within the Philippine esports community. The comment was subsequently deleted. Several members of the esports community, including shoutcaster Neil "Midnight" De Guzman, described the remark as insensitive. Philippine Daily Inquirer reported that it had sought a response from Ignacio but had not received one at the time of publication.

In 2021, the MPL Philippines imposed sanctions on Omega Esports, Nexplay EVOS, and Ignacio following a league match that was found to have violated the competition's rules on competitive integrity and professional conduct. Both teams were fined, while Ignacio received an additional US$500 fine and a two-match suspension after making a prohibited gesture during the event.

== Personal life ==
Ignacio previously lived in Belgium before returning to the Philippines to pursue a full-time career in content creation and esports. In November 2022, Ignacio and his girlfriend, April Joy Barrueso, had their first child.

== Awards and recognition ==
Year	Award	Category	Result	Ref.
2020	SuperGamerFest Awards	Streamer of the Year	Won	
2020	SuperGamerFest Awards	SEA Content Creator of the Year	Won	
2020	SuperGamerFest Awards	VOD Creator of the Year	Nominated	
