= Vessey School =

- U.S. National Register of Historic Places
- Location within South Dakota
- Nearest city: Haley, South Dakota
- Coordinates: 45.908076°N 103.127511°W
- Area: less than one acre
- Built: c.1920
- MPS: Harding and Perkins Counties MRA
- NRHP reference No.: 87000553
- Added to NRHP: April 10, 1987

The Vessey School, on County Road 859 in Harding County, South Dakota, near Haley, North Dakota, was built around 1920. It was listed on the National Register of Historic Places in 1987.

The listing included a second contributing building, a small house which was moved to the site to serve as a teacherage.

It is located 2.5 miles (4.0 km) south of the North Dakota state line.
