= Muschamp Vesey =

18th-century Anglican priest in Ireland

Muschamp Vesey, M.A. (1688–1762) was an Irish Anglican priest.

Vesey was born in County Galway and educated at Trinity College, Dublin, He was a Precentor of Killaloe Cathedral from 1713 to 1729; and Archdeacon of Leighlin from 1735 until his death.
