= Gustave, South Dakota =

Coordinates: 45°16′52″N 103°58′31″W

Gustave is a ghost town in Harding County, in the U.S. state of South Dakota. The GNIS classifies it as a populated place.

== History ==
A post office called Gustave was established in 1899, and remained in operation until 1954. The town has the name of Gustave Sorenson, an early settler.
