= Bluff View Cemetery Chapel =

Historic site in Clay County, South Dakota, US

- U.S. National Register of Historic Places
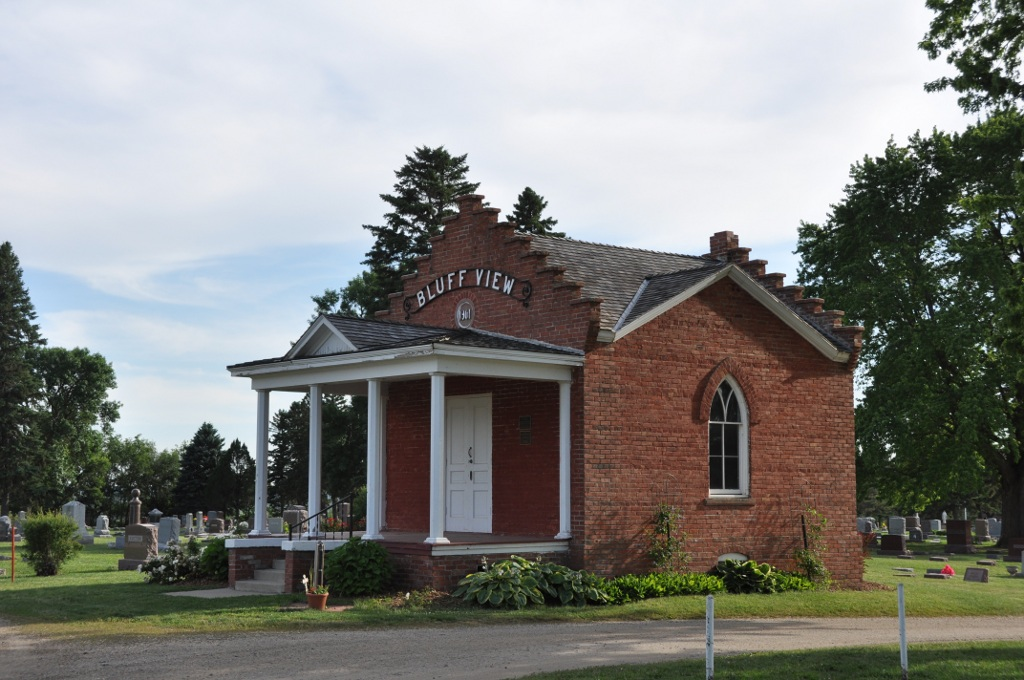

- Location within South Dakota Location within the United States
- Location: 0.2 mi. S of jct. of Crawford Rd. and Pinehurst Dr., Vermillion, South Dakota
- Coordinates: 42°46′25″N 96°54′20″W
- Area: less than one acre
- Built: 1901
- Architectural style: Classical Revival, Late Gothic Revival
- NRHP reference No.: 06000458
- Added to NRHP: May 31, 2006

Bluff View Cemetery Chapel is a religious chapel in Bluff View Cemetery in Vermillion, South Dakota. It was added to the National Register of Historic Places in 2006; no other part of the surrounding cemetery is included in this listing. The South Dakota State Preservation Office cited it as "a fine example of a vernacular interpretation of the Gothic Revival style in South Dakota".

Bluff View Cemetery was founded in 1882 and is situated on top of a bluff overlooking the Missouri River Valley. The chapel was built in 1901 out of brick and mortar and sits near the northern entrance of the cemetery, about .2 miles (0.32 km) south of the intersection of Pinehurst Avenue and Crawford Road. It is a mix of Late Gothic Revival and Neoclassical architecture. A wrought iron sign above the door bears the cemetery name and the year the chapel was built. The front entrance is sheltered by a small porch supported by six hexagonal columns. It consists of only one small room and a cellar. The main chamber, only measuring 20 by 18 feet (6.1 m × 5.5 m) and 16 feet (4.9 m) tall, was originally used for religious purposes, such as private prayer and mourning, but the building is only used for minor storage today. Historically, the basement space was used to store caskets over the winter until the ground thawed enough to allow for burials.
