= Golden Valley Norwegian Lutheran Church =

Historic church in South Dakota, United States

- U.S. National Register of Historic Places
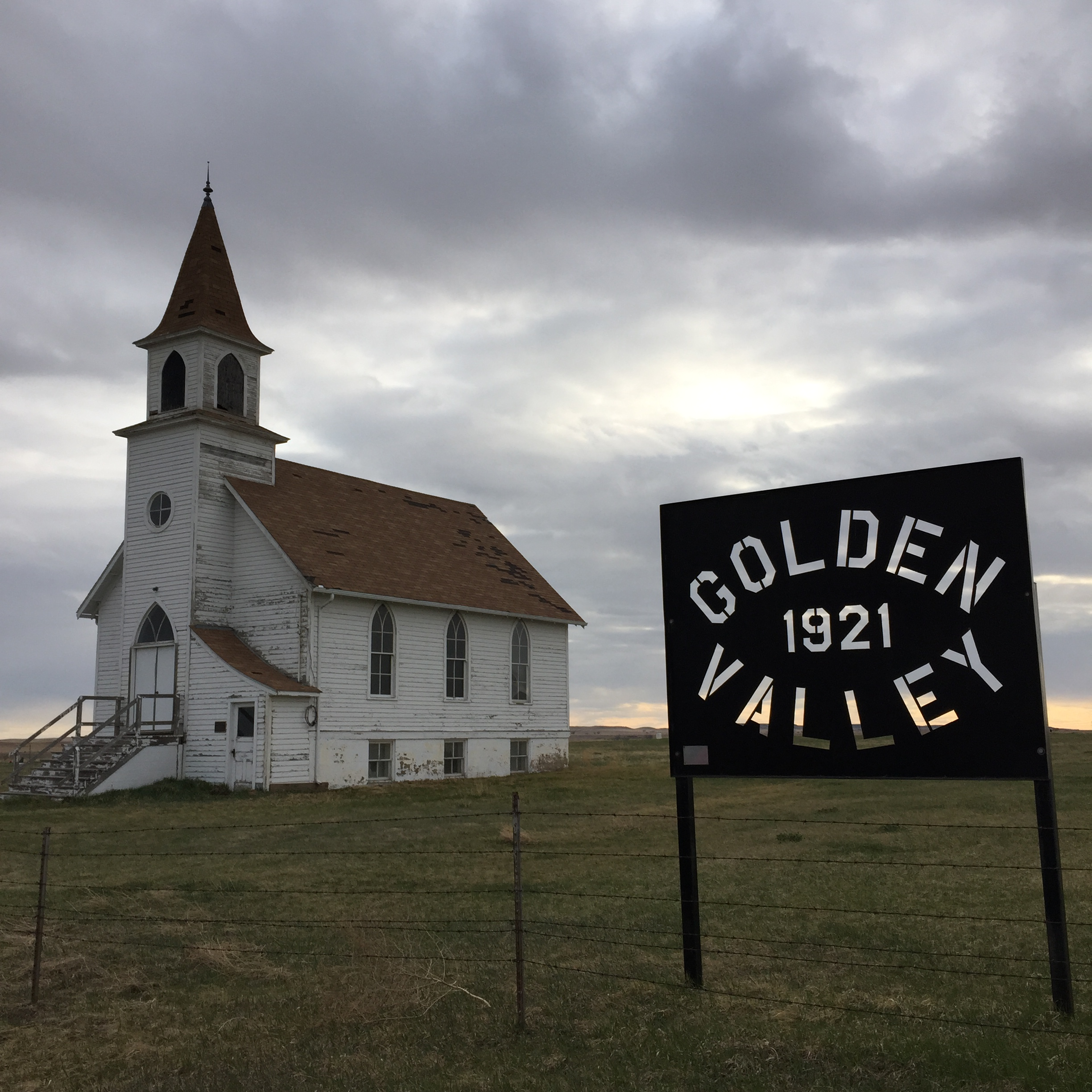

- Location within South Dakota Location within the United States
- Nearest city: Ralph, South Dakota
- Coordinates: 45°53′6″N 102°56′33″W
- Area: 2 acres (0.81 ha)
- Built: 1900
- Architectural style: Rural Gothic
- MPS: Harding and Perkins Counties MRA
- NRHP reference No.: 87000548
- Added to NRHP: April 10, 1987

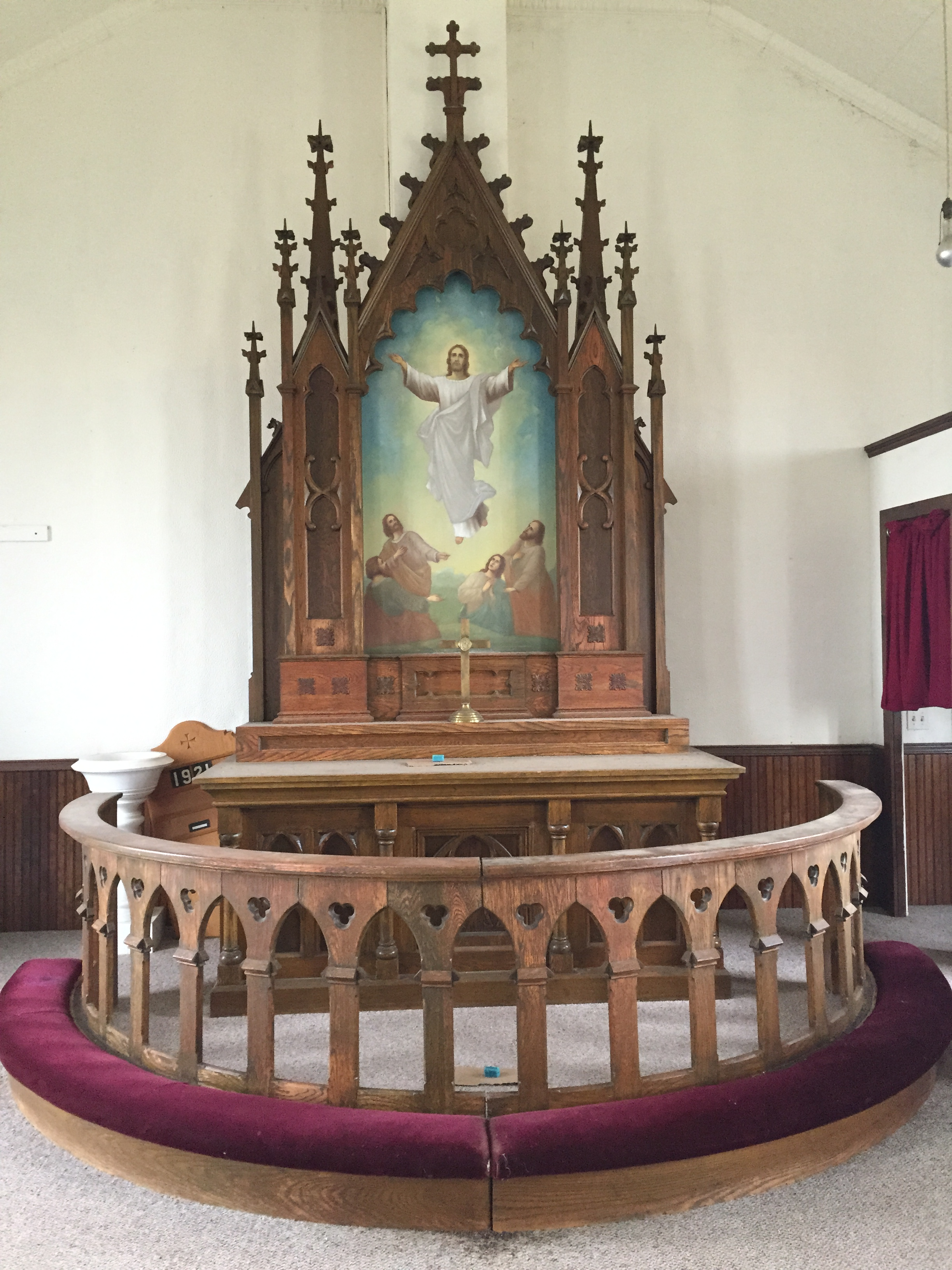
Norwegian-made church altar

Golden Valley Norwegian Lutheran Church is a historic Norwegian Lutheran church in Ralph, South Dakota. It was built around 1900 in a Rural Gothic style and was added to the National Register of Historic Places in 1987.

== History ==
During the late 1800s and the early 1900s the large Indian Reservation given to the Lakota was reduced in size and opened for settlement by white homesteaders. The Milwaukee Road railroad was being built and many "homesteaders" traveled on it to the northwest South Dakota area.

Numerous Norwegian people homesteaded in the area around the years of 1902 through 1910 and there were many ethnic enclaves adjacent to each other, including a Ukrainian settlement and German settlement. Eventually, the Norwegians built a sod church building, and its remains can still be noted along the highway from Reeder, North Dakota (about 12 miles to the south near a prominent curve of the road south of Grassy Butte). The local Norwegian community decided to build another church building after the first one became "weathered," and it was built by volunteer labor and funds by the men of the local Norwegian community. The church was the social center of the community as well as the religious center with ice cream socials, performances with local people, and musical events with instruments and singing.

As the economy improved and farms became larger and more efficient, fewer people resided in the area surrounding the Golden Valley Church. Eventually, not enough attendees remained to support the church, and so it closed around the late 1960s. The property on which the church stands remained titled in the name of the family who donated its use for the church before 1921. Eventually, the land was purchased by Kit and Barbara Johnson, and after Kit's death it passed in whole to Barbara. She and her son now independently operate the farm surrounding the church and the church building is largely controlled by the family. An organization has been established to help preserve the church building with support from the Christiansen, Johnson, and Howe families.

The church now stands alone on the gently sloping side of Grassy Butte with a beautiful view of the surrounding area. The altar in the church was imported from Norway and, generally, the church is well-preserved. The cemetery located in the back of the church has graves of many original church founder families.
