= St. John's Catholic Church (Paxton, South Dakota) =

Historic church in South Dakota, United States

- U.S. National Register of Historic Places
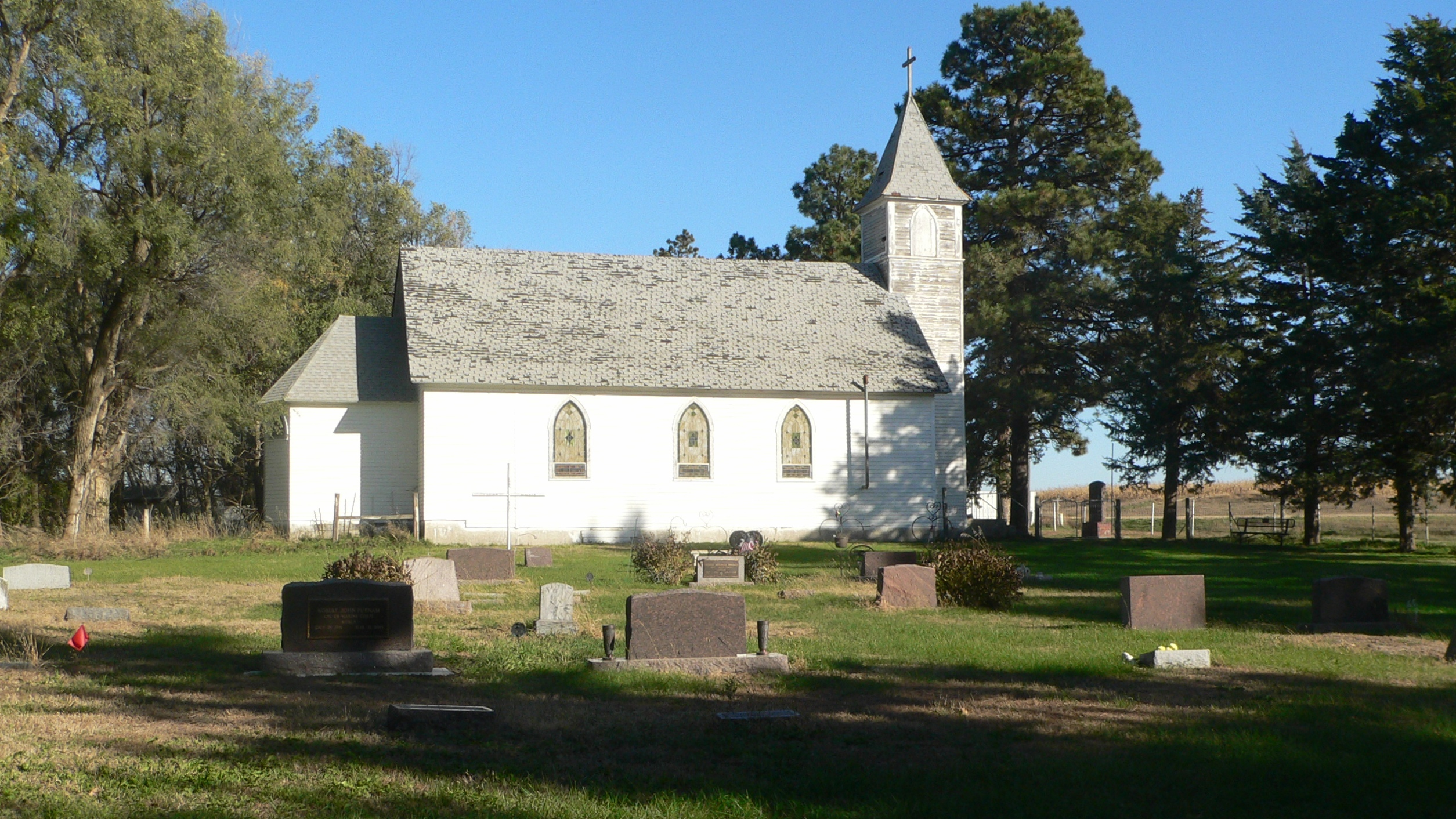
- Church and cemetery

- Location within South Dakota Location within the United States
- Location: Paxton, Section 31 R96W 73N, Dickens Township, near Dallas, South Dakota
- Coordinates: 43.082353°N 99.533289°W
- Built: 1915
- Architectural style: Carpenter Gothic
- NRHP reference No.: 09000945
- Added to NRHP: November 20, 2009

St. John's Catholic Church, built in 1915, is a historic Carpenter Gothic style Roman Catholic church building located in Paxton, Dickens Township near Dallas, South Dakota, United States. Its steep roof, lancet windows and belfry and entrance are typical of Carpenter Gothic churches. In 1973 it was closed but a year later it was given to a group of former parishioners who agreed to maintain it and its adjoining cemetery. The church and the cemetery are the only remnants of the former community of Paxton.

On November 20, 2009, the church was added to the National Register of Historic Places.
