= Sorum, South Dakota =

Unincorporated community in South Dakota, U.S.

Coordinates: 45°26′59″N 102°55′46″W

Sorum is an unincorporated community in Perkins County, in the U.S. state of South Dakota.

== History ==
Sorum was laid out in 1908, and named in honor of Chris Sorum, a local merchant. A post office called Sorum was established in 1910, and remained in operation until 1963. At one point, the town had a newspaper, The Sorum Journal, which ran at least in January 1911.
