= Axel Johnson Ranch =

- Johnson, Axel, Ranch
- U.S. National Register of Historic Places
- Location within South Dakota Location within the United States
- Nearest city: Reva, South Dakota
- Coordinates: 45°27′46″N 103°02′00″W
- Area: 3 acres (1.2 ha)
- Built: 1919
- Built by: Johnson, Axel
- Architectural style: Norwegian vernacular
- MPS: Harding and Perkins Counties MRA
- NRHP reference No.: 87000541
- Added to NRHP: May 19, 1987

Axel Johnson Ranch, on Sorum Road about 3 miles (4.8 km) east of South Dakota Highway 79, about 9 miles (14 km) south of Reva, South Dakota, was listed on the National Register of Historic Places in 1987. The listing included five contributing buildings and two contributing structures.

The ranch house is formed of four homestead shacks which were moved together in the 1910s. A gable-on-hip barn built in 1923 is of the greatest historic interest; it is "one of the few traditional Norwegian barns to have survived in Harding County to the present time."
