= Ludlow, South Dakota =

- Unincorporated community
- Location within South Dakota Location within the United States
- Coordinates: 45°50′4″N 103°22′34″W
- Country: United States
- State: South Dakota
- County: Harding
- Time zone: UTC-6 (Central (CST))
  - Summer (DST): UTC-5 (CDT)
- ZIP codes: 57755

Ludlow is an unincorporated community in Harding County, South Dakota, United States. It is located on Federal Highway 85, approximately 21 miles north of Buffalo, the Harding County seat, and six miles south of the North Dakota border. Although not tracked by the Census Bureau, nor having a post office, Ludlow has been assigned the ZIP code of 57755 by the United States Postal Service.

Heavily isolated, the town is located over 20 miles away from the nearest grocery store and gas station. The only business in operation is a bar, The Crooked Creek #1, which is frequently visited by travelers to and from Sturgis. The town is home to a rural school, and there was also a church located just north of town that was razed, likely in the 1990s, then rebuilt in 2012. As of 2018, the population was estimated to be near 3. The community has the name of William Ludlow, an explorer.
