= Harding, South Dakota =

Unincorporated community in South Dakota, US

Coordinates: 45°23′54″N 103°49′58″W

Harding is an unincorporated community in Harding County, in the U.S. state of South Dakota.

== History ==
A post office called Harding was established in 1896, and remained in operation until 1961. The community took its name from Harding County.
