= White River, South Dakota =

White River Makhízita Wakpá (Lakota)
- City
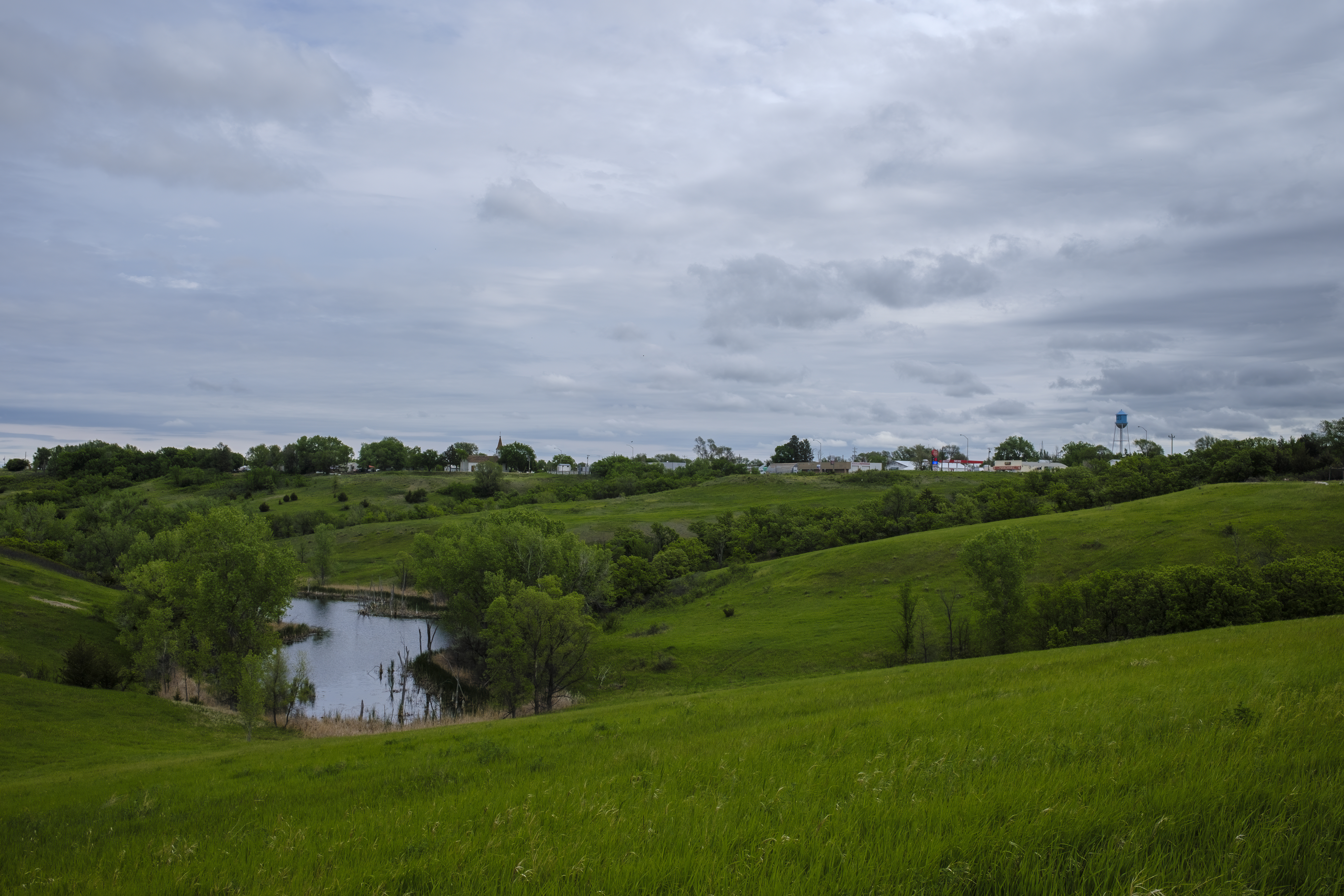

- Location in Mellette County and the state of South Dakota
- Coordinates: 43°34′10″N 100°44′46″W
- Country: United States
- State: South Dakota
- County: Mellette
- Incorporated: 1912

Area
  - Total: 0.52 sq mi (1.35 km^{2})
  - Land: 0.52 sq mi (1.35 km^{2})
  - Water: 0 sq mi (0.00 km^{2})
- Elevation: 2,139 ft (652 m)

Population (2020)
  - Total: 533
  - Density: 1,023.4/sq mi (395.12/km^{2})
- Time zone: UTC-6 (Central (CST))
  - Summer (DST): UTC-5 (CDT)
- ZIP code: 57579
- Area code: 605
- FIPS code: 46-71340
- GNIS feature ID: 1267653

White River (Lakota: Makhízita wakpá; "White Dirt River") is a city in and the county seat of Mellette County, South Dakota, United States. The population was 533 at the 2020 census.

== History ==
White River was founded as the seat of the newly formed Mellette County in 1911. The town was named after the White River.

== Geography ==
According to the United States Census Bureau, the city has a total area of 0.52 square miles (1.35 km^{2}), all land.

== Demographics ==
Historical population
Census	Pop.	Note	%±
1920	417		—
1930	471		12.9%
1940	562		19.3%
1950	465		−17.3%
1960	583		25.4%
1970	617		5.8%
1980	561		−9.1%
1990	595		6.1%
2000	598		0.5%
2010	581		−2.8%
2020	533		−8.3%
U.S. Decennial Census

=== 2020 census ===
As of the 2020 census, White River had a population of 533. The median age was 38.5 years, with 31.7% of residents under the age of 18 and 20.8% of residents aged 65 years or older. For every 100 females there were 105.0 males, and for every 100 females age 18 and over there were 91.6 males age 18 and over.

There were 187 households in White River, of which 30.5% had children under the age of 18 living in them. Of all households, 33.7% were married-couple households, 20.9% were households with a male householder and no spouse or partner present, and 33.2% were households with a female householder and no spouse or partner present. About 38.0% of all households were made up of individuals and 15.5% had someone living alone who was 65 years of age or older.

There were 231 housing units, of which 19.0% were vacant. The homeowner vacancy rate was 2.4% and the rental vacancy rate was 4.1%.

0.0% of residents lived in urban areas, while 100.0% lived in rural areas.

Racial composition as of the 2020 census
Race	Number	Percent
White	194	36.4%
Black or African American	1	0.2%
American Indian and Alaska Native	271	50.8%
Asian	3	0.6%
Native Hawaiian and Other Pacific Islander	0	0.0%
Some other race	5	0.9%
Two or more races	59	11.1%
Hispanic or Latino (of any race)	9	1.7%

=== 2010 census ===
As of the census of 2010, there were 581 people, 211 households, and 135 families residing in the city. The population density was 1,117.3 inhabitants per square mile (431.4/km^{2}). There were 245 housing units at an average density of 471.2 per square mile (181.9/km^{2}). The racial makeup of the city was 48.9% White, 0.3% African American, 40.6% Native American, 0.3% Asian, 0.9% from other races, and 9.0% from two or more races. Hispanic or Latino of any race were 2.1% of the population.

There were 211 households, of which 39.8% had children under the age of 18 living with them, 38.4% were married couples living together, 17.1% had a female householder with no husband present, 8.5% had a male householder with no wife present, and 36.0% were non-families. 28.9% of all households were made up of individuals, and 10.4% had someone living alone who was 65 years of age or older. The average household size was 2.52 and the average family size was 3.01.

The median age in the city was 39.4 years. 28.9% of residents were under the age of 18; 7.9% were between the ages of 18 and 24; 20.3% were from 25 to 44; 24.6% were from 45 to 64; and 18.2% were 65 years of age or older. The gender makeup of the city was 46.8% male and 53.2% female.

=== 2000 census ===
As of the census of 2000, there were 598 people, 219 households, and 141 families residing in the city. The population density was 1,169.7 inhabitants per square mile (451.6/km^{2}). There were 252 housing units at an average density of 492.9 per square mile (190.3/km^{2}). The racial makeup of the city was 51.84% White, 43.48% Native American, 0.17% Asian, and 4.52% from two or more races. Hispanic or Latino of any race were 1.00% of the population.

There were 219 households, out of which 35.2% had children under the age of 18 living with them, 40.6% were married couples living together, 17.8% had a female householder with no husband present, and 35.2% were non-families. 30.1% of all households were made up of individuals, and 12.3% had someone living alone who was 65 years of age or older. The average household size was 2.53 and the average family size was 3.12.

In the city, the population was spread out, with 29.4% under the age of 18, 8.5% from 18 to 24, 23.1% from 25 to 44, 20.9% from 45 to 64, and 18.1% who were 65 years of age or older. The median age was 36 years. For every 100 females, there were 93.5 males. For every 100 females age 18 and over, there were 87.6 males.

The median income for a household in the city was $25,500, and the median income for a family was $34,531. Males had a median income of $26,250 versus $15,536 for females. The per capita income for the city was $12,794. About 23.5% of families and 25.1% of the population were below the poverty line, including 29.2% of those under age 18 and 30.5% of those age 65 or over.

== Frontier Days ==
Started in 1912 in White River as a community celebration, Frontier Days continues today as a yearly event and attracts people from around the world. Incorporated into the celebration are a parade, rodeo, and a traditional Lakota Wacipi.

== See also ==
- List of cities in South Dakota
