= Buffalo, South Dakota =

- Town
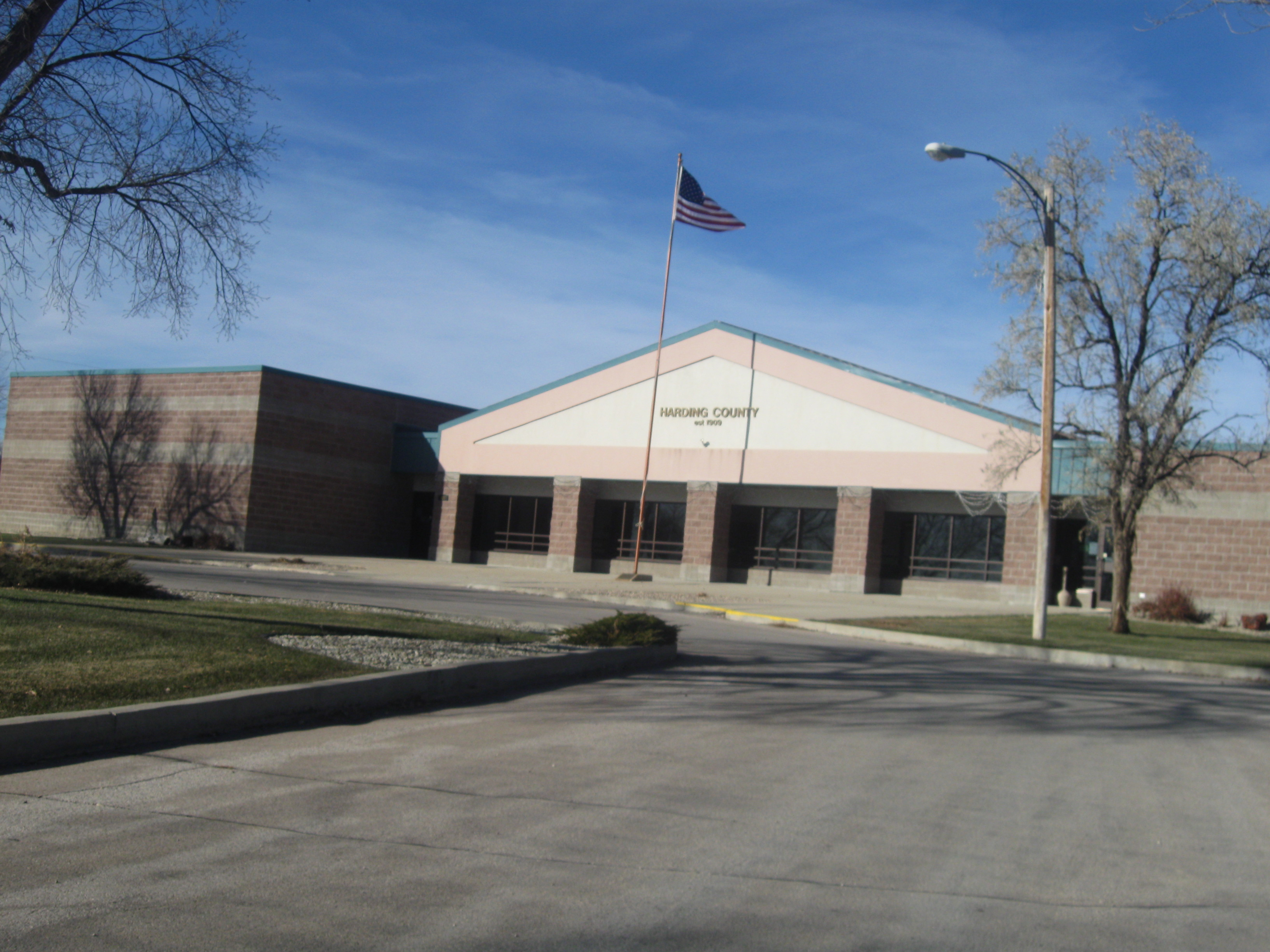
- Harding County Courthouse in Buffalo

- Location in Harding County and the state of South Dakota
- Coordinates: 45°35′11″N 103°32′36″W
- Country: United States
- State: South Dakota
- County: Harding
- Incorporated: 1949

Area
  - Total: 0.55 sq mi (1.43 km^{2})
  - Land: 0.55 sq mi (1.43 km^{2})
  - Water: 0 sq mi (0.00 km^{2})
- Elevation: 2,897 ft (883 m)

Population (2020)
  - Total: 346
  - Density: 624.9/sq mi (241.29/km^{2})
- Time zone: UTC-7 (Mountain (MST))
  - Summer (DST): UTC-6 (MDT)
- ZIP code: 57720
- Area code: 605
- FIPS code: 46-08140
- GNIS feature ID: 1267302
- Website: townofbuffalo.municipalimpact.com

Buffalo is a town in, and the county seat of, Harding County, South Dakota, United States. The population was 346 at the 2020 census.

== History ==
Buffalo was established in 1909. It was named for the large herds of bison (mistakenly called buffalo) that once roamed the area. It is about fifty miles west of Bison, South Dakota.

== Geography ==
According to the United States Census Bureau, the town has a total area of 0.55 square miles (1.42 km^{2}), all land.

=== Climate ===
Buffalo has a cold semi-arid climate (Köppen BSk). Like all of the High Plains, this climate features summers with cool to pleasant mornings and typically very warm to hot afternoons, alongside winters that average freezing but are extremely variable due to the conflict between hot Chinook winds and cold Arctic air. Annual precipitation is quite low at around 14.5 inches or 370 millimetres and concentrated in the spring and summer months from April to August. Buffalo lies within USDA hardiness zone 4a, meaning temperatures can drop to as low as −30 to −25 °F (−34.4 to −31.7 °C).

Climate data for Buffalo, South Dakota (2,881 feet above sea level)
Month	Jan	Feb	Mar	Apr	May	Jun	Jul	Aug	Sep	Oct	Nov	Dec	Year
Record high °F (°C)	69 (21)	72 (22)	82 (28)	94 (34)	101 (38)	108 (42)	113 (45)	114 (46)	105 (41)	95 (35)	84 (29)	70 (21)	114 (46)
Mean daily maximum °F (°C)	33.0 (0.6)	37.0 (2.8)	47.0 (8.3)	59.0 (15.0)	68.0 (20.0)	78.0 (25.6)	87.0 (30.6)	87.0 (30.6)	76.0 (24.4)	61.0 (16.1)	45.0 (7.2)	34.0 (1.1)	59.3 (15.2)
Daily mean °F (°C)	21.5 (−5.8)	25.0 (−3.9)	34.0 (1.1)	44.5 (6.9)	54.5 (12.5)	64.0 (17.8)	71.0 (21.7)	70.0 (21.1)	59.5 (15.3)	46.5 (8.1)	32.5 (0.3)	22.5 (−5.3)	45.5 (7.5)
Mean daily minimum °F (°C)	10.0 (−12.2)	13.0 (−10.6)	21.0 (−6.1)	30.0 (−1.1)	41.0 (5.0)	50.0 (10.0)	55.0 (12.8)	53.0 (11.7)	43.0 (6.1)	32.0 (0.0)	20.0 (−6.7)	11.0 (−11.7)	31.6 (−0.2)
Record low °F (°C)	−57 (−49)	−50 (−46)	−33 (−36)	−12 (−24)	4 (−16)	24 (−4)	32 (0)	27 (−3)	9 (−13)	−17 (−27)	−28 (−33)	−46 (−43)	−57 (−49)
Average precipitation inches (mm)	0.31 (7.9)	0.31 (7.9)	0.71 (18)	1.38 (35)	2.54 (65)	2.69 (68)	2.13 (54)	1.38 (35)	1.21 (31)	1.14 (29)	0.50 (13)	0.29 (7.4)	14.59 (371.2)
Source: Weather Channel

== Demographics ==
Historical population
Census	Pop.	Note	%±
1950	380		—
1960	652		71.6%
1970	393		−39.7%
1980	453		15.3%
1990	488		7.7%
2000	380		−22.1%
2010	330		−13.2%
2020	346		4.8%
U.S. Decennial Census

=== 2010 census ===
As of the census of 2010, there were 330 people, 168 households, and 86 families residing in the town. The population density was 600.0 inhabitants per square mile (231.7/km^{2}). There were 220 housing units at an average density of 400.0 per square mile (154.4/km^{2}). The racial makeup of the town was 97.3% White, 0.9% Native American, 0.3% from other races, and 1.5% from two or more races. Hispanic or Latino of any race were 1.5% of the population.

There were 168 households, of which 22.0% had children under the age of 18 living with them, 41.7% were married couples living together, 7.1% had a female householder with no husband present, 2.4% had a male householder with no wife present, and 48.8% were non-families. 46.4% of all households were made up of individuals, and 19.6% had someone living alone who was 65 years of age or older. The average household size was 1.96 and the average family size was 2.80.

The median age in the town was 43.8 years. 21.2% of residents were under the age of 18; 5.8% were between the ages of 18 and 24; 24.6% were from 25 to 44; 30.6% were from 45 to 64; and 17.9% were 65 years of age or older. The gender makeup of the town was 52.7% male and 47.3% female.

== See also ==
- List of towns in South Dakota
