= Ralph, South Dakota =

- Unincorporated community
- Location within South Dakota Location within the United States
- Coordinates: 45°46′36″N 103°3′56″W
- Country: United States
- State: South Dakota
- County: Harding
- Time zone: UTC-7 (Mountain (MST))
  - Summer (DST): UTC-6 (MDT)
- ZIP codes: 57650

Ralph is an unincorporated community in Harding County, South Dakota, United States. Although not tracked by the Census Bureau, Ralph has been assigned the ZIP code of 57650.

The community was named for James Ralph Howard, the original owner of the town site.
