= Harding County, South Dakota =

County in South Dakota, United States

- County
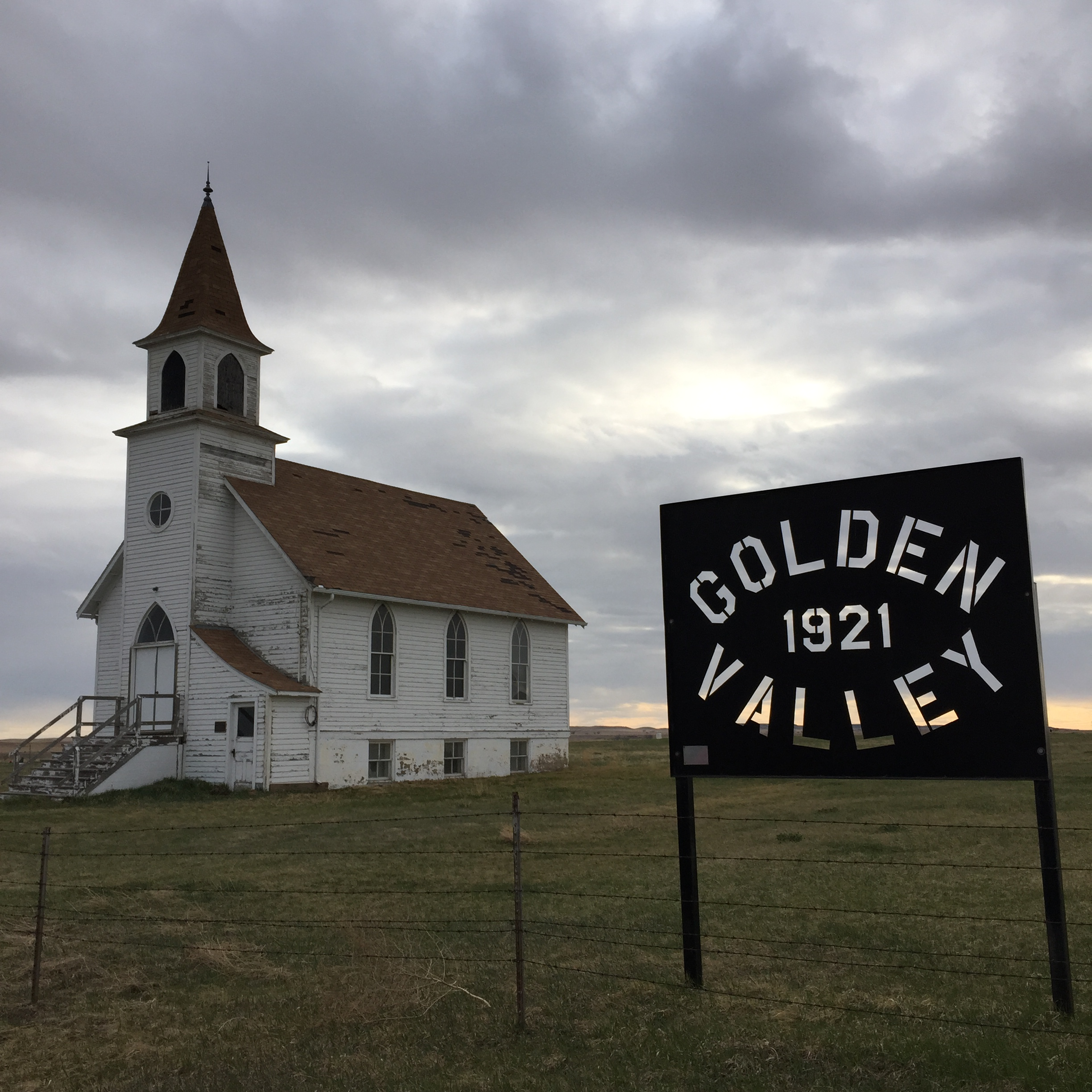
- Golden Valley Norwegian Lutheran Church in Ralph, South Dakota

- Location within the U.S. state of South Dakota
- Coordinates: 45°35′47.8″N 103°28′25.935″W
- Country: United States
- State: South Dakota
- Created: 1881
- Dissolved: 1898
- Re-created with revised shape: 1908
- Organized: 1909
- Named for: J. A. Harding
- Seat: Buffalo
- Largest town: Buffalo

Area
  - Total: 2,678 sq mi (6,940 km^{2})
  - Land: 2,671 sq mi (6,920 km^{2})
  - Water: 6.5 sq mi (17 km^{2}) 0.2%

Population (2020)
  - Total: 1,311
  - Estimate (2025): 1,331 ▲
  - Density: 0.4908/sq mi (0.1895/km^{2})
- Time zone: UTC−7 (Mountain)
  - Summer (DST): UTC−6 (MDT)
- Congressional district: At-large
- Website: www.hardingsd.net

Harding County is a county in the northwestern corner of the U.S. state of South Dakota. As of the 2020 census, the population was 1,311, making it the third-least populous county in South Dakota. Its county seat is Buffalo.

Harding County was established as a county in the Dakota Territory on March 5, 1881, but was not organized at that time. Its name recognized J. A. Harding, who had been Speaker of the House of Dakota Territory. Its boundaries were altered in 1883, in 1889, and in 1894. On November 8, 1898, Harding County was dissolved and its territory assigned to Butte County. However, on November 3, 1908, it was again created (with altered boundaries) from Butte County's area, and on February 17, 1909 its governing organization was completed.

Custer National Forest has its South Dakota portion in Harding County, and South Dakota State University operates the Antelope Range and Livestock Research Station about 14 miles (23 km) east of Buffalo.

== Geography ==
Harding County lies at the northwest corner of South Dakota. Its western boundary line abuts the east boundary line of the state of Montana, and its north boundary line abuts the south boundary line of the state of North Dakota. Its terrain consists of high hills, generally sloping to the east. Its highest point is a ridge that runs northwest to southeast near the county's southwest corner, at 3,366 ft (1,026 m) ASL.

Harding County has a total area of 2,678 square miles (6,940 km^{2}), of which 2,671 square miles (6,920 km^{2}) is land and 6.5 square miles (17 km^{2}) (0.2%) is water. It is the fourth-largest county in South Dakota by area.

=== Major highways ===
- U.S. Highway 85
- South Dakota Highway 20
- South Dakota Highway 79

=== Adjacent counties ===
- Bowman County, North Dakota – north
- Adams County, North Dakota – northeast
- Perkins County – east
- Butte County – south
- Carter County, Montana – west
- Fallon County, Montana – northwest

=== Protected areas ===
- Custer National Forest (partial)
- Gardner Lake State Game Production Area
- Mallula State Game Production Area
- State Experiment Farm and Antelope Reserve

=== Lakes ===
- Lake Gardner – It is 203 acres in surface area and is approximately 14 feet deep at its deepest point. Channel Catfish, Largemouth Bass, Walleye, Yellow Bullhead, and Yellow Perch inhabit the lake.
- Leger Dam
- Rabbit Creek Dam – This lake has a surface area of 17 acres and is inhabited by a variety of warm water fish including Largemouth Bass.
- Vessey Dam – Eight acres in size, this lake is stocked with rainbow trout.

== Demographics ==
Historical population
Census	Pop.	Note	%±
1910	4,228		—
1920	3,953		−6.5%
1930	3,589		−9.2%
1940	3,010		−16.1%
1950	2,289		−24.0%
1960	2,371		3.6%
1970	1,855		−21.8%
1980	1,700		−8.4%
1990	1,669		−1.8%
2000	1,353		−18.9%
2010	1,255		−7.2%
2020	1,311		4.5%
2025 (est.)	1,331	▲	1.5%
U.S. Decennial Census; 1790–1960 1900–1990; 1990–2000 2010–2020

=== 2020 census ===
As of the 2020 census, there were 1,311 people, 537 households, and 358 families residing in the county. Of the residents, 24.8% were under the age of 18 and 19.2% were 65 years of age or older; the median age was 41.2 years. For every 100 females there were 106.8 males, and for every 100 females age 18 and over there were 109.8 males.

The population density was 0.5 inhabitants per square mile (0.19/km^{2}).

The racial makeup of the county was 92.6% White, 0.4% Black or African American, 2.2% American Indian and Alaska Native, 0.0% Asian, 0.8% from some other race, and 4.0% from two or more races. Hispanic or Latino residents of any race comprised 2.4% of the population.

There were 537 households in the county, of which 29.2% had children under the age of 18 living with them and 17.3% had a female householder with no spouse or partner present. About 29.4% of all households were made up of individuals and 12.3% had someone living alone who was 65 years of age or older.

There were 720 housing units, of which 25.4% were vacant. Among occupied housing units, 74.3% were owner-occupied and 25.7% were renter-occupied. The homeowner vacancy rate was 0.5% and the rental vacancy rate was 9.0%.

=== 2010 census ===
As of the 2010 census, there were 1,255 people, 539 households, and 348 families in the county. The population density was 0.5 inhabitants per square mile (0.19/km^{2}). There were 731 housing units at an average density of 0.27 units per square mile (0.10 units/km^{2}). The racial makeup of the county was 95.9% white, 1.5% American Indian, 0.1% black or African American, 0.1% Asian, 0.7% from other races, and 1.7% from two or more races. Those of Hispanic or Latino origin made up 1.6% of the population. In terms of ancestry, 41.4% were Norwegian, 31.8% were German, 18.4% were Irish, 13.2% were English, and 2.6% were American.

Of the 539 households, 26.0% had children under the age of 18 living with them, 55.5% were married couples living together, 4.8% had a female householder with no husband present, 35.4% were non-families, and 32.1% of all households were made up of individuals. The average household size was 2.27 and the average family size was 2.87. The median age was 43.3 years.

The median income for a household in the county was $34,792 and the median income for a family was $46,111. Males had a median income of $38,929 versus $20,924 for females. The per capita income for the county was $22,004. About 13.7% of families and 16.1% of the population were below the poverty line, including 19.5% of those under age 18 and 16.9% of those age 65 or over.

== Politics ==
Harding is a heavily Republican county in Presidential and Congressional elections. The last Democrat to win a majority in the county was Franklin D. Roosevelt in his 46-state 1936 landslide. Jimmy Carter in 1976 came within 15 votes of carrying the county, but since then the solitary Democrat to top 22 percent of Harding County's ballots has been Michael Dukakis in the drought-influenced 1988 election – and none of the last seven Democratic presidential candidates have topped so much as twenty percent. In 2008, Republican John McCain won 78% of the county's vote, while in 2012 Mitt Romney won 86% of the vote, and Donald Trump in 2016 won 90%, his strongest showing in South Dakota, with Hillary Clinton narrowly securing second place from Gary Johnson. Trump would again carry over 90 percent of the vote in the county in 2020 and 2024.

United States presidential election results for Harding County, South Dakota
Year	Republican		Democratic		Third party(ies)	
Year	No.	%	No.	%	No.	%
1912	0	0.00%	325	29.49%	777	70.51%
1916	520	41.57%	597	47.72%	134	10.71%
1920	648	58.43%	213	19.21%	248	22.36%
1924	702	62.07%	107	9.46%	322	28.47%
1928	1,032	72.78%	368	25.95%	18	1.27%
1932	625	43.28%	715	49.52%	104	7.20%
1936	524	37.92%	819	59.26%	39	2.82%
1940	755	52.98%	670	47.02%	0	0.00%
1944	552	52.82%	493	47.18%	0	0.00%
1948	529	50.87%	479	46.06%	32	3.08%
1952	809	73.35%	294	26.65%	0	0.00%
1956	650	63.35%	376	36.65%	0	0.00%
1960	676	63.89%	382	36.11%	0	0.00%
1964	489	50.10%	487	49.90%	0	0.00%
1968	564	63.02%	266	29.72%	65	7.26%
1972	637	71.57%	253	28.43%	0	0.00%
1976	470	49.74%	459	48.57%	16	1.69%
1980	727	74.64%	205	21.05%	42	4.31%
1984	723	79.28%	186	20.39%	3	0.33%
1988	633	70.33%	259	28.78%	8	0.89%
1992	515	58.46%	139	15.78%	227	25.77%
1996	537	68.41%	151	19.24%	97	12.36%
2000	650	88.92%	64	8.76%	17	2.33%
2004	704	86.38%	94	11.53%	17	2.09%
2008	575	78.34%	135	18.39%	24	3.27%
2012	638	86.33%	82	11.10%	19	2.57%
2016	695	90.26%	38	4.94%	37	4.81%
2020	748	92.00%	49	6.03%	16	1.97%
2024	754	91.95%	48	5.85%	18	2.20%

In the South Dakota Senate Harding is part of the 28th Senate district, which is held by Republican Ryan Maher. In the State House Harding is part of district 28B, which is held by Republican Travis Ismay.

== Communities ==
=== Towns ===
- Buffalo (county seat)
- Camp Crook

=== Unincorporated communities ===
- Harding
- Karinen
- Ladner
- Ludlow
- Ralph
- Redig
- Reva

=== Ghost towns ===
- Bullock
- Gustave

== See also ==
- National Register of Historic Places listings in Harding County, South Dakota
- Dogie Butte
