= National Register of Historic Places listings in Perkins County, South Dakota =

Location of Perkins County in South Dakota

This is a list of the National Register of Historic Places listings in Perkins County, South Dakota.

This is intended to be a complete list of the properties and districts on the National Register of Historic Places in Perkins County, South Dakota, United States. The locations of National Register properties and districts for which the latitude and longitude coordinates are included below, may be seen in a map.

There are 19 properties and districts listed on the National Register in the county. One additional property was previously listed but has since been removed.

This National Park Service list is complete through NPS recent listings posted June 13, 2025.

== Current listings ==
	Name on the Register	Image	Date listed	Location	City or town	Description
1	Donald Beckon Ranch		April 10, 1987 (#87000551)	6 miles southeast of Zeona; 45°08′03″N 102°53′33″W	Zeona	
2	Bethany United Methodist Church		April 10, 1987 (#87000559)	9.5 miles west of Lodgepole; 45°48′17″N 102°49′13″W	Lodgepole	
3	Carr No. 60 School		April 10, 1987 (#87000560)	12 miles southeast of Lodgepole; 45°43′05″N 102°31′05″W	Lodgepole	
4	Anna Carr Homestead		January 20, 1978 (#78002566)	Off Highway 20; 45°31′36″N 102°28′10″W	Bison	
5	Duck Creek Lutheran Church and Cemetery		April 10, 1987 (#87000561)	7 miles southwest of Lodgepole along Duck Creek; 45°46′33″N 102°46′37″W	Lodgepole	
6	Foster Ranch House		April 10, 1987 (#87000557)	4 miles east of Highway 79; 45°20′09″N 102°06′32″W	Chance	
7	Golden Rule Department Store		December 12, 1976 (#76001752)	201-203 Main St. 45°56′24″N 102°09′20″W	Lemmon	
8	L.F. Harriman House		December 12, 1976 (#76001753)	111 2nd Ave., W. 45°56′39″N 102°09′43″W	Lemmon	
9	Immanuel Lutheran Church		April 10, 1987 (#87000555)	15 miles north of Mud Butte and U.S. Route 212 on gravel county road 45°11′38″N 102°55′04″W	Zeona	
10	Lemmon Petrified Park	Lemmon Petrified Park	November 21, 1977 (#77001254)	Off U.S. Route 12; 45°56′15″N 102°09′04″W	Lemmon	
11	G.E. Lemmon House		December 12, 1976 (#76001754)	507 3rd Ave., W. 45°56′21″N 102°09′43″W	Lemmon	
12	Ole Quamman House		January 21, 2015 (#14001188)	400 2nd Ave. W 45°56′27″N 102°09′43″W	Lemmon	
13	Richards Cabins		February 5, 2003 (#02001769)	16901 Moreau R Rd. 45°09′40″N 102°40′14″W	Faith	
14	Rockford No. 40 School		April 10, 1987 (#87000549)	15 miles northeast of Bison; 45°41′22″N 102°21′49″W	Bison	
15	Sittner Farm		February 19, 2008 (#08000055)	RR T18N R15E S5&6; 45°33′27″N 102°19′01″W	Meadow	
16	Sorum Cooperative Store		April 10, 1987 (#87000556)	Main St. 45°27′15″N 102°59′42″W	Sorum	
17	Sorum Hotel		April 10, 1987 (#87000552)	Main St. 45°27′13″N 102°56′02″W	Sorum	
18	Spring Creek School		April 10, 1987 (#87000554)	1 mile east of Zeona; 45°11′36″N 102°54′04″W	Zeona	
19	Thomas J. Veal Ranch		April 10, 1987 (#87000558)	7 miles southeast of junction of Highways 20 and 73; 45°24′40″N 102°16′51″W	Chance	

== Former listing ==
	Name on the Register	Image	Date listed	Date removed	Location	City or town	Description
1	South Dakota Department of Transportation Bridge No. 53-101-196		November 19, 1999 (#99001341)	March 26, 2008	Local Road over South Fork Grand River	Bison	

== See also ==
- List of National Historic Landmarks in South Dakota
- National Register of Historic Places listings in South Dakota
