= Hart Creek =

Hart Creek may refer to:

- Hart Creek (Georgia)
- Hart Creek (Spotted Bear River tributary), a stream in Montana
- Hart Creek (South Dakota)
