= John Lopez =

American sculptor

- John Lopez in his barn
- Born: July 16, 1971 (age 55); United States
- Education: Black Hills State University; Northern State University
- Occupation: Sculptor
- Website: http://www.johnlopezstudio.com/

John Lopez (born July 16, 1971) is an American sculptor known for his life-size hybrid metal sculptures made out of discarded farm equipment and bronze. He is equally known for his 12 life-size presidential monuments made for The City of Presidents in Rapid City, South Dakota. Some of the presidents include John F. Kennedy and John Jr., Grant, Carter, Harrison, Coolidge, T. Roosevelt, and Garfield. He lives in Lemmon, South Dakota.

== Early life ==
John Lopez was born and raised on a ranch in South Dakota. John gained his bachelor's degree in commercial art from Black Hills State University. He was originally a bronze-work sculptor. Between 1993 and 1995, Lopez was an apprentice with DC Lamphere Studio, Sturgis, South Dakota. Sculpted and installed bronze memorial, Ft. Meade. He also assisted with 25-foot "Resurrection" sculpture project, Omaha, Nebraska. Also, he assisted with the "Our Lady of Hope" project, Basilica of The National Shrine during the period of his apprenticeship. Also between 1995 and 1997 he was an apprentice at James Michael Maher Studio, Belle Fourche, SD. He Assisted with the scale-up of the Costner Dunbar buffalo sculpture project, Deadwood SD, designed by sculptor Peggy Detmers.

John's aunt's death marked a transition period in his career. After casting an archangel figure on the tomb site of his aunt with scrap metal, John's works changed from being bronze works to scrap metal works. “I was dealing with the loss of one of my biggest fans, so I put all my energy and emotion into it."

== Works and contribution ==
Lopez uses art to tell stories of the cowboys in America. His works reflect the western and rodeo theme bronzes. John Lopez works have influenced the work of other Artist around the world, such as the works of Dotun Popoola in Africa and many more. Many students and researchers in the field of Arts around the world conduct regular excursion to John's studio in South Dakota in the United States of America. John Studio is home for many tourists and art lovers.

Lopez has numerous contributions to the art culture. His works have spurred change in Sculpture narrative around the globe. Most of John's works have been commissioned in the United States of America. He has several commissioned works across the United States.

Lopez sculpted over 12 statutes of twelve United States Presidents in The City of Presidents in Downtown Rapid City in South Dakota. These works include: John Adams, life-size bronze, 2000; Jimmy Carter, life-size bronze, 2001; John Quincy Adams, life-size bronze, 2002; John F. Kennedy and John Jr., life-size bronze, 2003; William H. Harrison, life-size bronze, 2004; Calvin Coolidge, life-size bronze, 2005; Warren G. Harding and dog, Laddie Boy, life-size bronze, 2006; Teddy Roosevelt, life-size bronze, 2007; Ulysses S. Grant, life-size bronze, 2008; James Garfield and Benjamin Harrison, life-size bronze, 2009 and Chester Arthur, life-size bronze in 2010.

He made the life-size full body portrait of Chief Red Iron (Hybrid Metal) located at Granary Rural Cultural Center and Garden, Groton, South Dakota. John created a life-sized Drover (Australian) for the Hotel Drover in the Fort Worth Stockyards. Also he made the life-size hybrid metal buffalo "Dakotah" located at Dakotah Steak House and Restaurant. John authored Sculpture Grand River Series and Sculpture Coffee Table Book.

Some of John's works

The "Iron Star" Is displayed in Hill City, South Dakota

== Exhibitions ==
Lopez's art works have been exhibited across the United States, including Governor's Hunt Art Show, Pierre, South Dakota, Black Hills Stock Show, Rapid City, South Dakota, Sculpture in the Park, Loveland, Colorado, ProRodeo Hall of Fame, Colorado Springs, Colorado, AAEA Fall Showcase of the Equine Art, Lexington, Kentucky, The Western Spirit Art Show, Cheyenne Frontier Days, Wyoming, and Dahl Fine Arts Center, Rapid City, South Dakota in 2009 among others.
