= Guldner House =

Historic house in Kansas, United States

- U.S. National Register of Historic Places
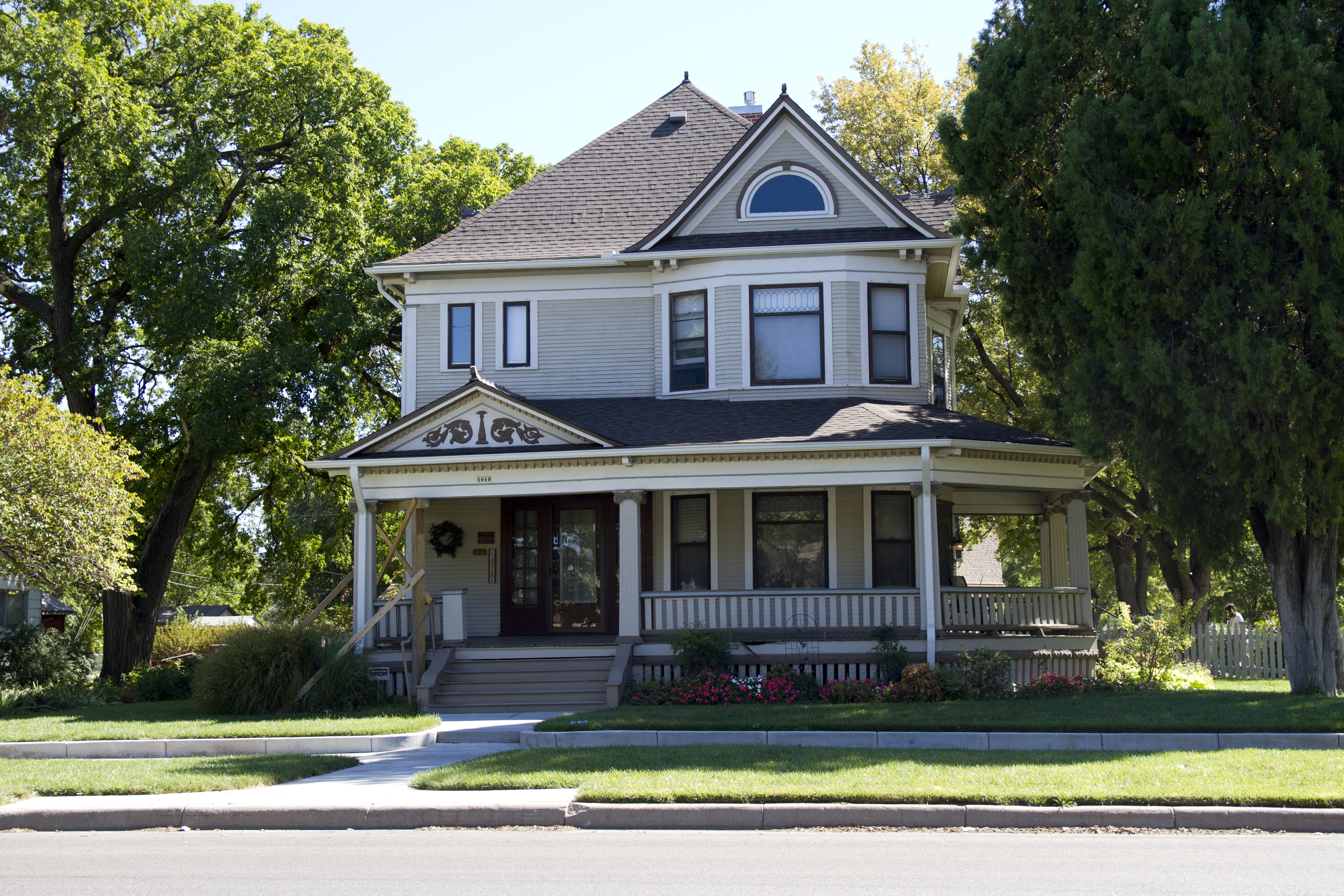

- Location within Kansas Location within the United States
- Location: 1919 W. Douglas, Wichita, Kansas
- Coordinates: 37.6837°N 97.3638°W
- Area: less than one acre
- Built: 1910
- Built by: Benjamin Guldner
- Architect: George William Ashby
- Architectural style: Queen Anne, free classic
- MPS: Residential Resources of Wichita, Sedgwick County, Kansas 1870-1957
- NRHP reference No.: 09001206
- Added to NRHP: January 7, 2010

The Guldner House, at 1919 W. Douglas in Wichita in Sedgwick County, Kansas is a Queen Anne style house built to a design by the Radford Architectural Company. It was listed on the National Register of Historic Places in 2010.

The house was built in 1910 by Benjamin Guldner, who was born on March 3, 1859, in Davenport, Iowa and moved to Rice County, Kansas at the age of 18 to help his father in a mill. One of his earlier family residencies was built in section 5 of Eureka, Kansas at a cost of two thousand dollars. He had married Henrietta Evans on May 6, 1880, with whom he had had three children, Lillie O, Maggie E, and Roscoe L. Guldner, his wife, and family moved into the house at the end of 1910 and it was occupied by Guldner's daughter Maggie until her death in November 1980.

The design was Radford Design #7082 taken from page 254 of William A. Radford's publication Radford's Artistic Homes published in 1908. Radford's designs were regularly updated in their details and assigned new numbers, and the design bears a strong resemblance to Radford Design #517 on pages 156 and 157 of Radford's earlier Radford American Homes 100 House Plans published in 1903. Guldner ordered the design through Caldwell and Hoffman Lumber Dealers in 1910, with the lumber sourced from the Western Planing Mill in Wichita. He requested several variations from the Radford specification (in letters to Caldwell and Hoffman and marked on the blueprints themselves), including to the style of the front door, a widening of the hallway, and an extension to the bay, and consequent adjustment to the roof, by 3 feet (91 cm). Later owners in the 1980s were to remodel the kitchen and replace the sash windows with fixed windows.

== See also ==
- National Register of Historic Places listings in Sedgwick County, Kansas
- Foster Ranch House

== Sources ==
- "Guldner House". National and State Registers of Historic Places. Kansas Historical Society.
- A Biographical History of Central Kansas. Vol. 2. Chicago and New York: The Lewis Publishing Company. 1902.
- Kathy L. Morgan (August 5, 2009). "National Register of Historic Places Registration: Sedgwick Guldner House / 173-5880-6483" (PDF). National Register of Historic Places. Kansas Historical Society.
