= Spring Creek School =

Several schools are called Spring Creek School.

In New Zealand:

- Spring Creek School, New Zealand, in the Marlborough Region

In the United States:

- Spring Creek School, Kansas, a former school - see National Register of Historic Places listings in Sumner County, Kansas
- Spring Creek School, South Dakota - see National Register of Historic Places listings in Perkins County, South Dakota
- Spring Creek School, Texas - See Spring Creek Independent School District

== See also ==
- Spring Creek High School (Nevada)
- Spring Creek High School (North Carolina), Seven Springs, North Carolina
