= Dotun Popoola =

Nigerian artist (born 1981)

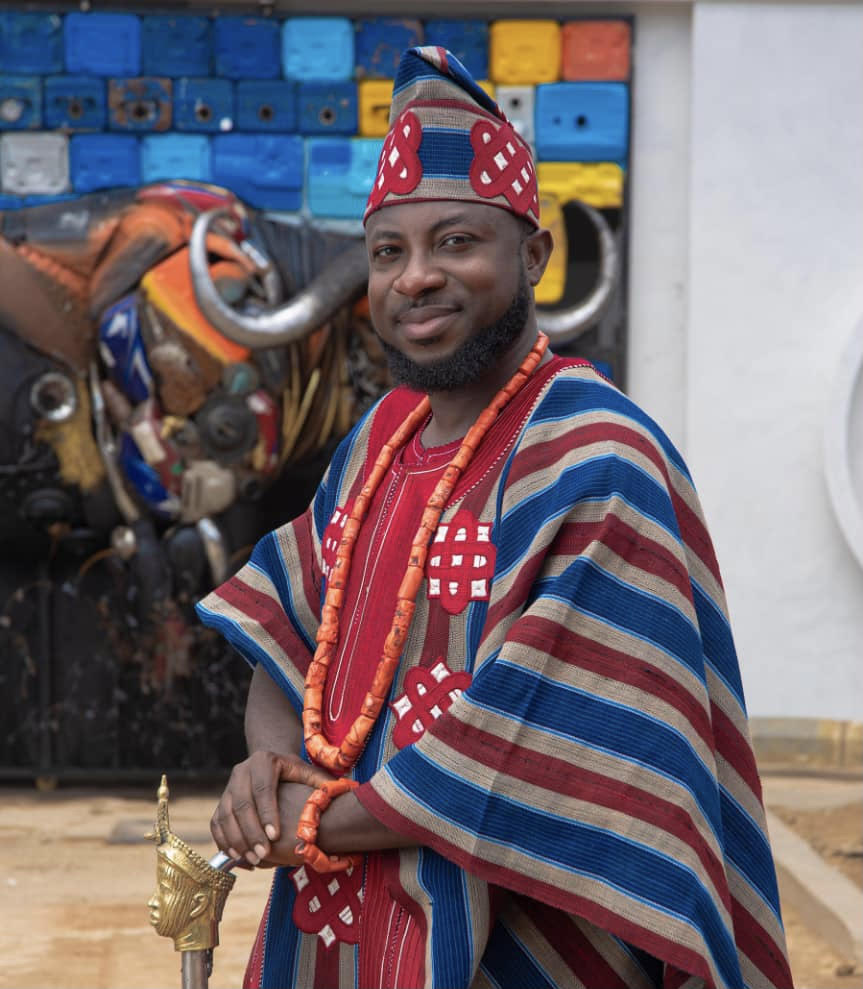
- Dotun Popoola in a traditional attire
- Born: 7 April 1981 (age 45); Lagos
- Education: Auchi Polytechnic; Obafemi Awolowo University
- Occupation: Sculptor
- Board member of: artinmedicine Project
- Website: dotunpopo.com

Dotun Popoola (born in 1981, Lagos) is a contemporary Nigerian artist (sculptor) who specializes in synergetic metal sculpting. He creates pieces of art works from discarded scrap metals. His works are focused on transforming trash to treasures, rubbish to rubies and waste to wealth by repurposing wastes that threaten the ecosystem.

== Early life ==
Dotun studied painting and general arts in Auchi Polytechnic, Auchi, Edo State where he held a national diploma in painting and general art in 2004. He thereafter went to Obafemi Awolowo University, where he obtained his first and second degrees in fine and applied arts with a specialisation in sculpture and painting respectively. Dotun is a resident artist in Lopez Studio in Lemmon, South Dakota, and travels between United States and Nigeria to paint commissioned murals. He was a curator at the National Gallery of Art.

He had a residency at Akoje Residency

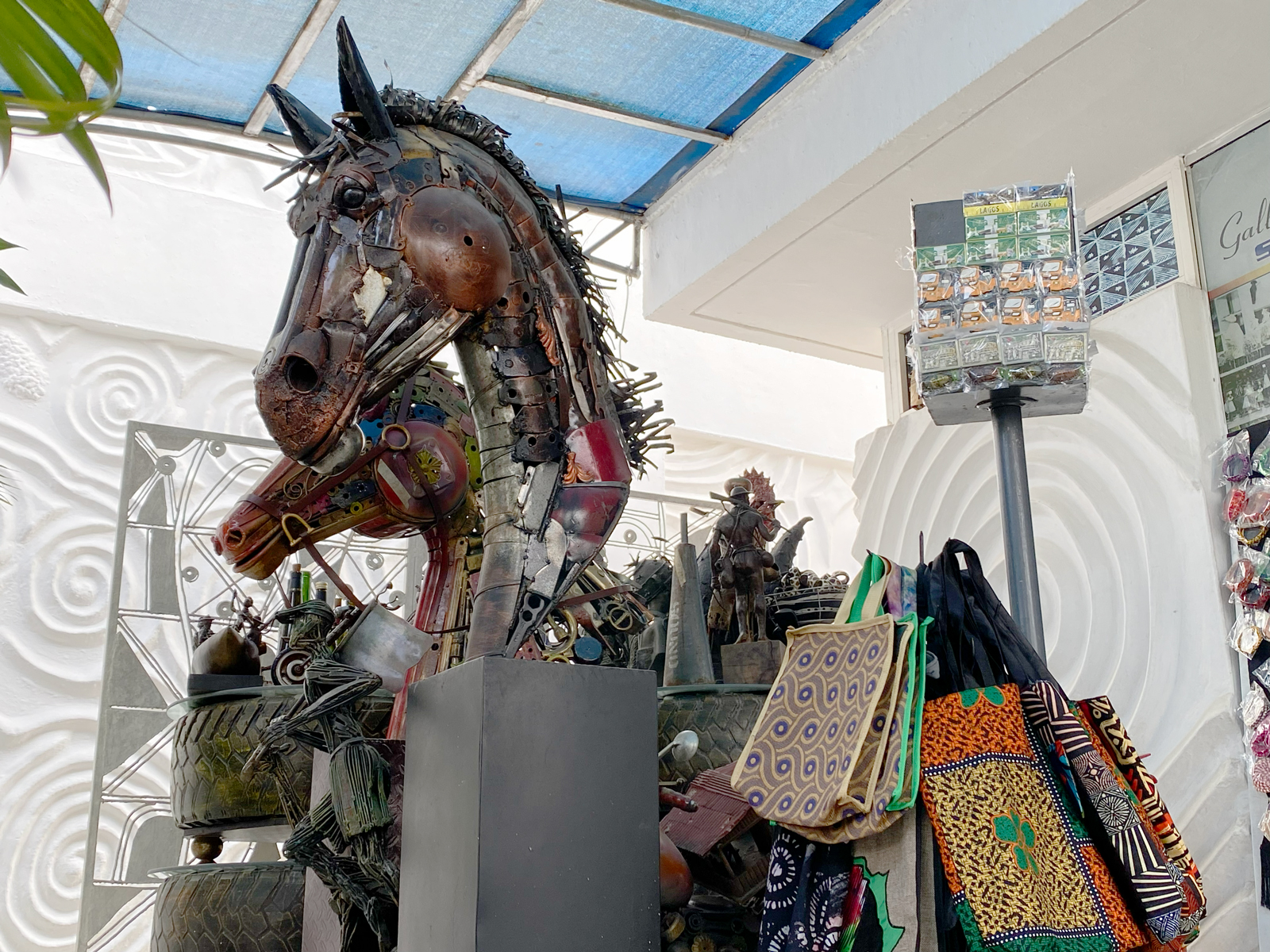
Works of Popoola, Nike Art Gallery (August 2026)

== Exhibitions, works and contributions ==
Popoola works primarily with scrap metal, where creating animal forms is his favourite way to use the medium. Some of his works were exhibited in ART X Lagos. He had a solo exhibition called "Irin Ajo" (Journey) in Signature Beyond Art Gallery, Lagos, where he presented around 24 metal works of his.
