= L.F. Harriman House =

Historic house in South Dakota, United States

- L. F. Harriman House
- U.S. National Register of Historic Places
- Location within South Dakota Location within the United States
- Location: 111 2nd Ave., W, Lemmon, South Dakota
- Coordinates: 45°56′39″N 102°09′43″W
- Area: less than one acre
- Built: 1908
- Built by: Harriman, L.F.
- Architectural style: Queen Anne
- NRHP reference No.: 76001753
- Added to NRHP: December 12, 1976

The L. F. Harriman House, located at 111 2nd Ave., W, in Lemmon, South Dakota, is a concrete block house which was built in 1908. It was listed on the National Register of Historic Places in 1976.

It is a one-and-a-half-story cottage with elements of Queen Anne style.

Its NRHP nomination notes its significance as "one of the finest examples of concrete block-faced homes in the state. Because there are so few older homes that are made of this material, it is important to recognize them for their contribution to South Dakota architecture."
