= Golden Rule Department Store =

- U.S. National Register of Historic Places
- Location within South Dakota Location within the United States
- Location: 201-203 Main St., Lemmon, South Dakota
- Coordinates: 45°56′24″N 102°09′20″W
- Area: less than one acre
- Built: 1908
- Built by: Patterson, John
- Architectural style: Romanesque Revival
- NRHP reference No.: 76001752
- Added to NRHP: December 12, 1976

The Golden Rule Department Store, located at 201-203 Main St. in Lemmon, South Dakota, is a building built in 1908. It has also been known as the J.C. Elliot Building. The building was listed on the National Register of Historic Places in 1976.

It was built by John Patterson just a year after Lemmon was founded. It is a two-story four-bay Romanesque Revival-style building.

== See also ==
- Golden Rule Stores, a predecessor of JCPenney
