= William A. Radford =

American architect and publisher of architectural and construction books

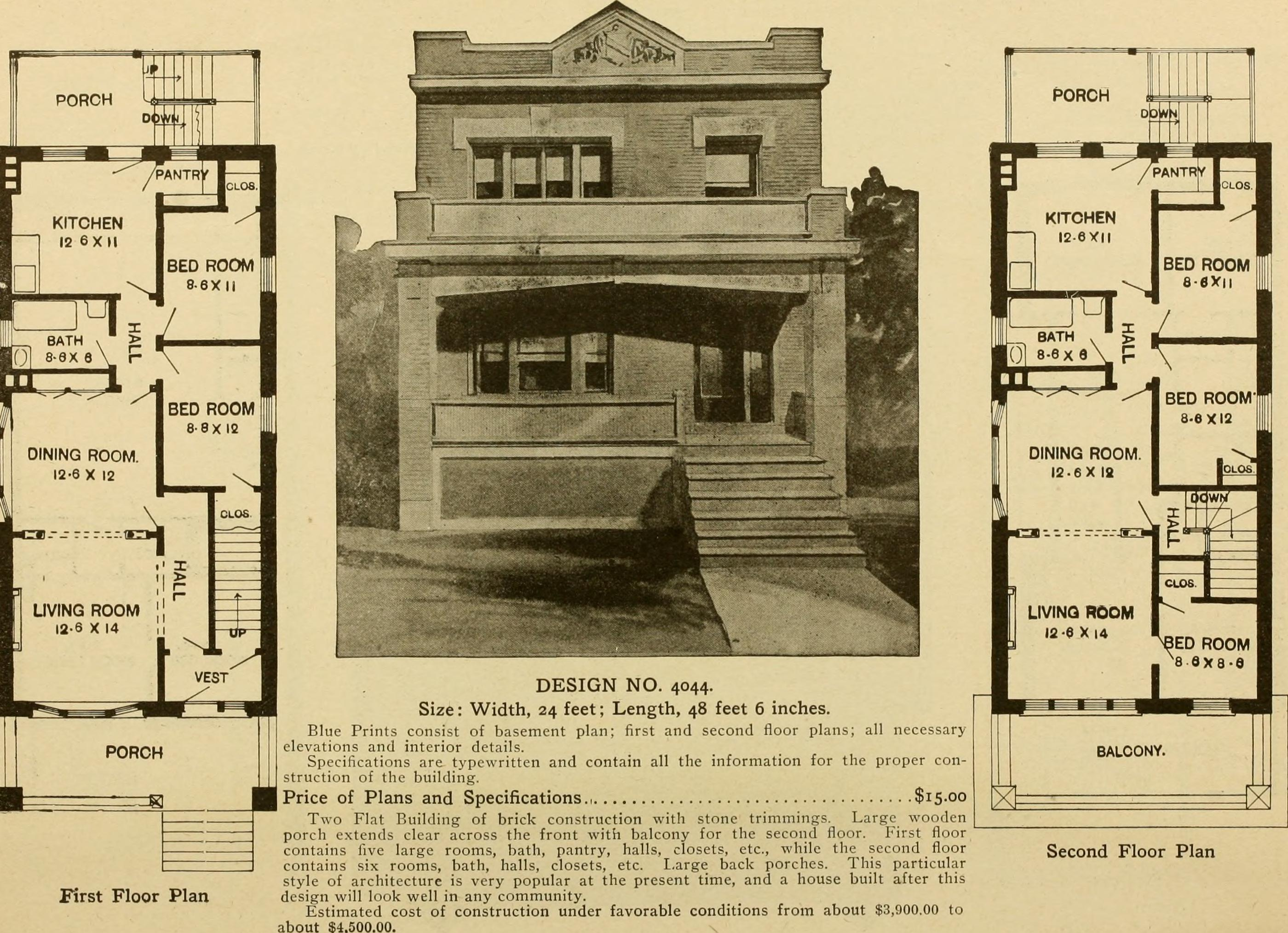
One of 300 plans from Radford 1912a

William A. Radford (1865–1943) was an American architect and publisher of numerous architectural and construction books via his Radford Architectural Company in Chicago, Illinois.

== Biography ==
=== Early life ===
Radford was born in Oshkosh, Wisconsin, in 1865, where he attended school and then joined the Radford Brothers Sash and Door Company, eventually in 1890 becoming the company secretary and treasurer. He married and had two sons with Helen M. Manuel, and by 1899 was living in Riverside, Illinois. He was a Mason and a Shriner.

=== Radford Architectural Company ===
It was the Radford Architectural Company for which he is remembered, whose output over the years comprised more than 40 books on various types of construction and more than 1000 plans and specifications for buildings ranging from homes to small commercial buildings. Radford founded this company in 1902, and his publications were collaborations with prominent authors in the field at the time including Frank E. Kidder, Alfred G. King, and Ira O. Baker. He was also the founder of various magazines: Beautiful Homes, Farm Mechanics, American Carpenter and Builder, and Cement Homes.

Although, in the opinion of his biographer Neal Vogel, some of his designs were "lackluster versions" of Queen Anne or American Foursquare designs, some of his designs reflect the Prairie School aesthetic and his publications helped to spread it across the United States in the early 20th century. Radford embraced what were then modern innovations, with books on construction types that were just coming into use such as his 1700-page-long 1910 Radford Cyclopedia of Cement Construction which dealt in the use of concrete and whose articles were written by a team of experts on the subject.

=== Retirement ===
Radford retired to a ranch in Cupertino, California, at the onset of the Great Depression and died there in 1943.

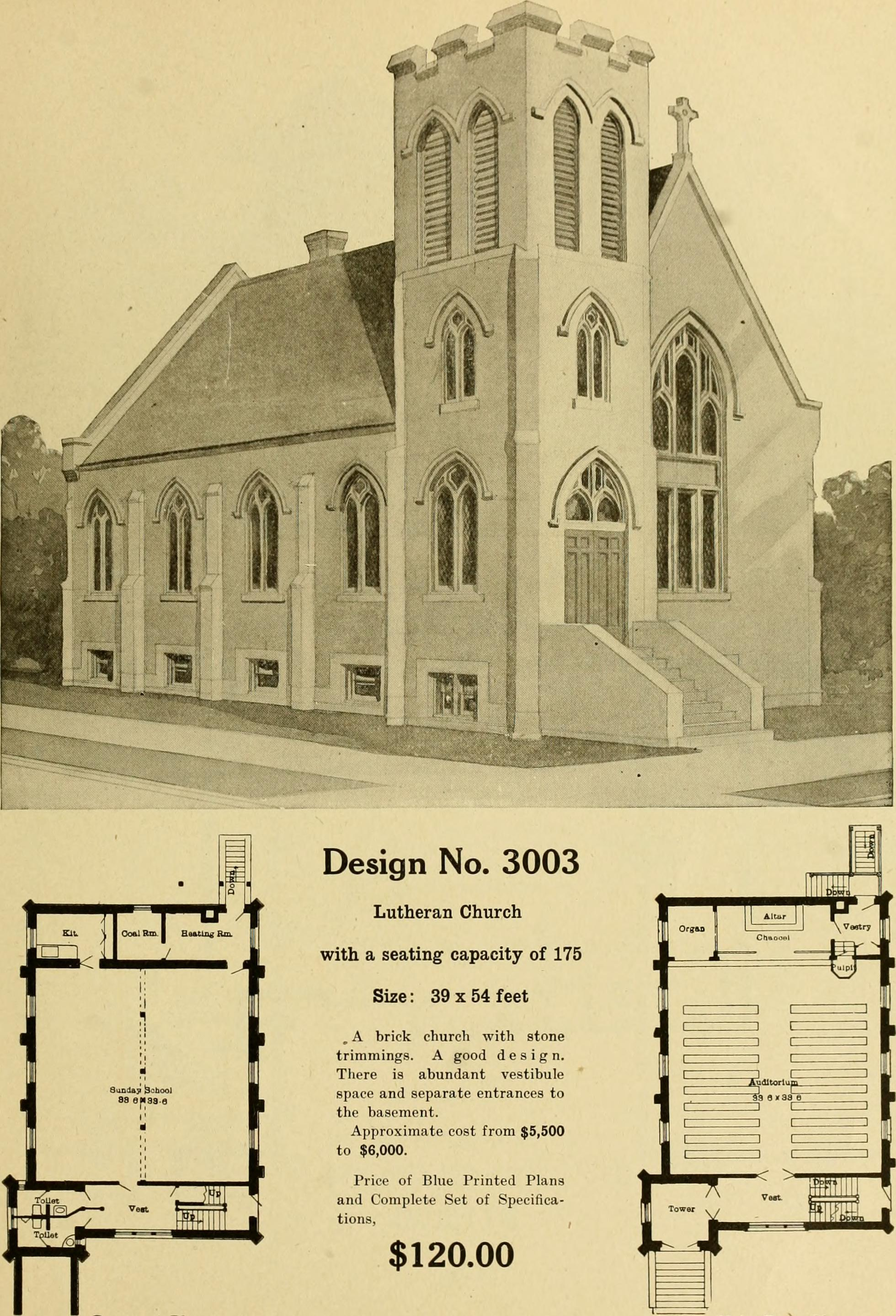
A plan for a Lutheran church, also from Radford 1912a

== Bibliography ==
- Radford, William A. (1907). The Steel Square and Its Uses. Vol. 1. New York: Industrial Publication Company. (The Steel Square and Its Uses at the Internet Archive)
- Radford, William A. (1910). Radford's Garages and How to Build Them. Chicago: Radford Architectural Company. (Radford's Garages and How to Build Them at the HathiTrust Digital Library)
- Radford, William A. (1912a). Brick Houses and how to Build Them. Chicago: Radford Architectural Company. (Brick Houses and how to Build Them at the Internet Archive)
- Radford, William A. (1912b). Radford Cyclopedia of Cement Construction: A General Reference Work on Up-to-date Practice in the Manufacture and Testing of Cements; the Selection of Concreting Materials, Tools, and Machinery; the Proportioning, Mixing, and Depositing of Concrete, and Its Application to All Types and Details of Construction, Plain, Ornamental, and Reinforced; Together with Analysis of the Principles of Constructive Design, Cost Estimating, and the Allied Branches of Stone and Brick Masonry and Steel Construction; Based on the Practical Experience of a Large Staff of Experts in Actual Construction Work. Radford Architectural Company. LCCN 10030420. OCLC 3355391. (Full work at the HathiTrust Digital Library)

== See also ==
- Guldner House and Foster Ranch House — NRHP listed houses built to Radford plans; the Guldner House is #7082 in Radford's Artistic Homes (1908)

== Sources ==
- Vogel, Neal (September 1993). "William Radford". Old-House Journal. Vol. 21, no. 5. Active Interest Media. ISSN 0094-0178.
