= Duck Creek Lutheran Church and Cemetery =

Historic cemetery in Perkins County, South Dakota, US

- U.S. National Register of Historic Places
- Location within South Dakota Location within the United States
- Nearest city: Lodgepole, South Dakota
- Coordinates: 45°46′32″N 102°46′38″W
- Area: 1.5 acres (0.61 ha)
- Built: 1900
- Architectural style: Rural Gothic
- MPS: Harding and Perkins Counties MRA
- NRHP reference No.: 87000561
- Added to NRHP: April 10, 1987

Duck Creek Lutheran Church and Cemetery is a historic church located outside of Lodgepole in rural Perkins County, South Dakota. The church was added to the National Register in 1987. It was built during 1900 of wood-frame construction in rural Carpenter Gothic style.
