= Ira Osborn Baker =

American academic (1853–1925)

Ira Osborn Baker was an American academic at the Grainger College of Engineering at the University of Illinois Urbana-Champaign.

== Biography ==
Baker was born in Linton, Indiana, on September 23, 1853, the son of Amanda Osborn Baker and Hiram Walker Baker. Baker enrolled at the University of Illinois (now Grainger College of Engineering) in March 1871 and graduated in civil engineering in 1874, to become an assistant in civil engineering and physics and then in charge of the department in 1878. He was in charge of the civil engineering department for 39 years, with an overall teaching career spanning 48 years. His married his first wife Emma Burr on 1877-08-05 and his second wife Angie Ewing Ritter on 1913-08-07, and died on 1925-11-08.

== Treatise on Masonry Construction ==
As an author, he was widely known for his 1889 Treatise on Masonry Construction which was the first comprehensive book on the subject. He also collaborated with William A. Radford. At the 1893 World's Columbian Exposition he led the division on engineering education, which formed the Society for the Promotion of Engineering Education (SPEE).

A contemporary review in the New York Engineering and Building Record described the Treatise as a broad and satisfactory treatment of the subject, with a few areas worthy of improvement. The reviewer called Baker's "almost unqualified approval of dolomites" questionable, noting that New York engineers found local sources of such material substandard. The reviewer also took issue with the illustrations for kinds of masonry and finished surfaces, which Baker had taken from a report of the American Society of Civil Engineers, observing that they were not up to the quality of the other illustrations in the book, and were somewhat misleading as rather than being illustrations of good quality work were in fact pictures of farm fences in Connecticut. Other points that the reviewer took issue with were the use of concrete to make pneumatic foundations watertight, the reviewer asserting that "no amount of concrete will do this".

The reviewer observed an omission of a 1889 expert Report of the New York Aqueduct Commission, and the lack of a chapter on inspection, given the likelihood that the engineering students that the book was originally aimed at would likely find themselves doing masonry inspection after graduation. Conversely, the book's index, and its various tables and diagrams were described as "good"; with theoretical problems "simply and clearly stated" and typical specifications "well selected".

By 1909, the book was in its tenth edition, revised and enlarged from the first. An example of a professional engineer's use of the Treatise was published as Fisher 1896 in the same Engineering and Building Record.

== Sources ==
- Talbot, Arthur N. (December 1933). Pask, Joseph A. (ed.). "The College of Engineering". The Technograph. Vol. 48, no. 2. Urbana: Illini Publishing Company.
- Vogel, Neal (September 1993). "William Radford". Old-House Journal. Vol. 21, no. 5. Active Interest Media. ISSN 0094-0178.
- "Ira O. Baker". Chi Epsilon, UIUC Chapter.
- "BAKER, IRA OSBORN: 1853–1925". Indiana Authors. Indiana University.
- Belanger, Dian Olson (1998). "Engineering: An American Tradition". Enabling American Innovation: Engineering and the National Science Foundation. Purdue University Press. ISBN 9781557531117.
- Meyer, Henry C., ed. (1889-12-07). "Baker's Masonry Construction". The Engineering and Building Record and The Sanitary Engineer. Vol. 21, no. 1. New York.
- Hess, Jeffrey A. (1986). Historic Highway Bridges in Wisconsin. Vol. 1. Wisconsin Department of Transportation.
