= KBJM =

- Lemmon, South Dakota; United States
- Frequency: 1400 kHz

Programming
- Format: Country (day)/Oldies (night)

Ownership
- Owner: Media Associates, Inc.

History
- First air date: June, 1966

Technical information
- Licensing authority: FCC
- Facility ID: 40994
- Class: C
- Power: 1,000 watts (unlimited)
- Transmitter coordinates: 45°55′5″N 102°11′55″W
- Translator: (104.9 MHz) K285HH (Lemmon)

Links
- Public license information: Public file; LMS
- Webcast: Listen Live
- Website: kbjm.com

KBJM (1400 AM) is a radio station licensed to serve Lemmon, South Dakota. The station is owned by Media Associates, Inc. It airs a full-service Country music format during the day and an Oldies music format during the evening and overnight. KBJM Radio is located at 500 1st Avenue East in Lemmon, the transmitter site is southwest of town on Township Road.

The station was assigned these call letters by the Federal Communications Commission.
