= Bethany United Methodist Church =

Historic church in South Dakota, United States

- U.S. National Register of Historic Places
- Location within South Dakota Location within the United States
- Nearest city: Lodgepole, South Dakota
- Coordinates: 45°48′17″N 102°49′13″W
- Area: 2 acres (0.81 ha)
- Built: 1890
- Architectural style: Rural Gothic
- MPS: Harding and Perkins Counties MRA
- NRHP reference No.: 87000559
- Added to NRHP: April 10, 1987

Bethany United Methodist Church is a historic church in Lodgepole, South Dakota. It was built in 1890 and was added to the National Register in 1987.

It is notable as one of the earliest churches built in South Dakota, and "is architecturally significant as part of an important group of churches influenced by the 1852 publication Upjohn's Rural Architecture."

It is located about 9.5 miles (15.3 km) west of Lodgepole in Perkins County, South Dakota. When listed the building was in deteriorated condition.
