= Foster Ranch House =

Historic house in South Dakota, United States

- U.S. National Register of Historic Places
- Location within South Dakota Location within the United States
- Nearest city: Chance, South Dakota
- Coordinates: 45°20′09″N 102°06′32″W
- Area: less than one acre
- Built: 1918
- MPS: Harding and Perkins Counties MRA
- NRHP reference No.: 87000557
- Added to NRHP: April 10, 1987

The Foster Ranch House, near Chance, South Dakota, was built in 1918. It was listed on the National Register of Historic Places in 1987.

It is located about 4 miles (6.4 km) east of South Dakota State Highway 79, about 18 miles (29 km) southeast of Meadow, South Dakota.

It was deemed "a fine example of a concrete block house that was popularized by William A. Radford."
