= Hart Creek (Spotted Bear River tributary) =

Stream in Montana, U.S.

Coordinates: 47°51′41″N 113°08′38″W

Hart Creek is a stream in the U.S. state of Montana. It is a tributary to the Spotted Bear River.

Hart Creek was named after Evert Hart, who built several cabins in the 1920s.
