= Donald Beckon Ranch =

- Beckon, Donald, Ranch
- U.S. National Register of Historic Places
- Location within South Dakota Location within the United States
- Location: 6 miles southeast of Zeona, South Dakota
- Coordinates: 45°08′03″N 102°53′33″W
- Area: 3 acres (1.2 ha)
- Built: 1910
- Built by: Beckon, Donald
- MPS: Harding and Perkins Counties MRA
- NRHP reference No.: 87000551
- Added to NRHP: April 10, 1987

The Donald Beckon Ranch, near Zeona in Perkins County, South Dakota, United States, was built in 1910. It was listed on the National Register of Historic Places in 1987.

The listing included 11 contributing buildings and one contributing structure on 3 acres (1.2 ha). Two modern, metal buildings were deemed non-contributing. Most notable is the sod house built by Donald Beckon in 1910.
