= Lemmon Petrified Wood Park & Museum =

Tourist attraction in Lemmon, South Dakota

- Lemmon Petrified Park
- U.S. National Register of Historic Places
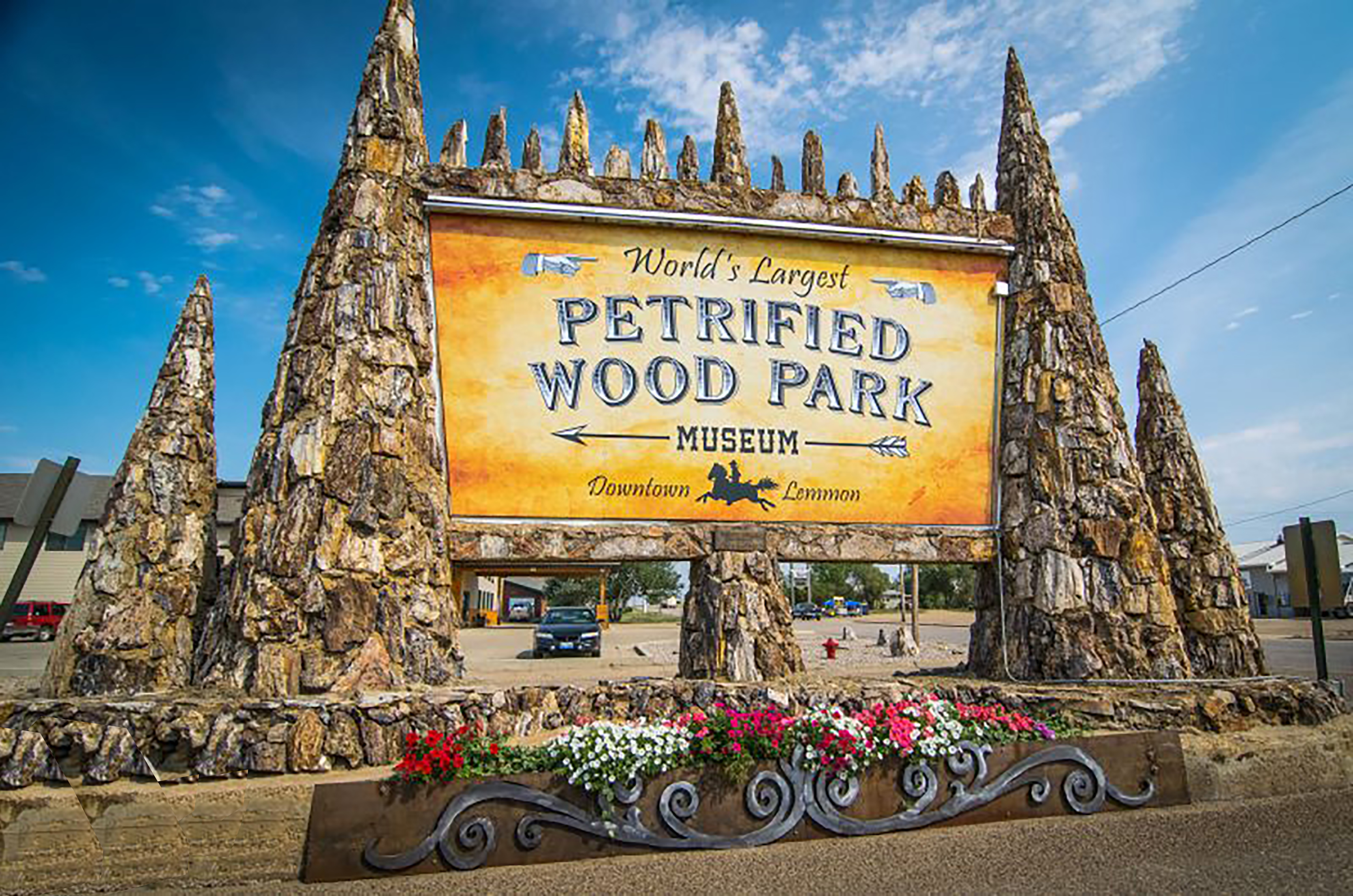
- Sign at an entrance to the park
- Interactive map of Lemmon Petrified Park
- Location: Off U.S. 12, Lemmon, South Dakota
- Area: 3 acres (1.2 ha)
- Built: 1933
- Architect: Olaf S. Quammen
- NRHP reference No.: 77001254
- Added to NRHP: November 21, 1977

The Lemmon Petrified Wood Park & Museum is a roadside attraction located off U.S. 12 in Lemmon, South Dakota, which features large outdoor sculptures created out of Mesozoic petrified wood. It was created in 1933 by Ole Quammen, a former mayor of Lemmon. Besides the outdoor park, the site has a museum, also built out of petrified wood, which hosts smaller collections of fossils. It was listed on the National Register of Historic Places in 1977 as the Lemmon Petrified Park; when dedicated, it claimed to be the largest petrified wood park in the world. The park and museum, which do not charge admission, are open during the summer months between Memorial Day and Labor Day.

== History ==
The Lemmon Petrified Wood Park & Museum was created by Ole Quammen, who settled in Lemmon in 1907, ran a local lumbermill, and for a time served as mayor of Lemmon. An amateur geologist, Quammen also collected samples of petrified wood he discovered across Perkins County, which has an abundance of the fossils. By 1926, Quammen enlisted his son, David, to help plan the park, and they began preparations in 1928. Construction began in 1930. Quammen employed up to 40 men in two teams: one to locate and move the fossils to the park via wagon, and one to construct the monuments according to his instructions. The men were instructed to gather the best fossil specimens they could find for inclusion in the park. During the Great Depression, construction of the park provided an important source of income for many local families who otherwise would not have had any source of income.

On June 7, 1932, a dedication ceremony was attended by hundreds of people, and the park officially opened to the public. Quammen, South Dakota Governor Warren E. Green, and North Dakota Supreme Court Justice John Burke delivered speeches at the event. A school band from Bismarck, North Dakota, provided live music.

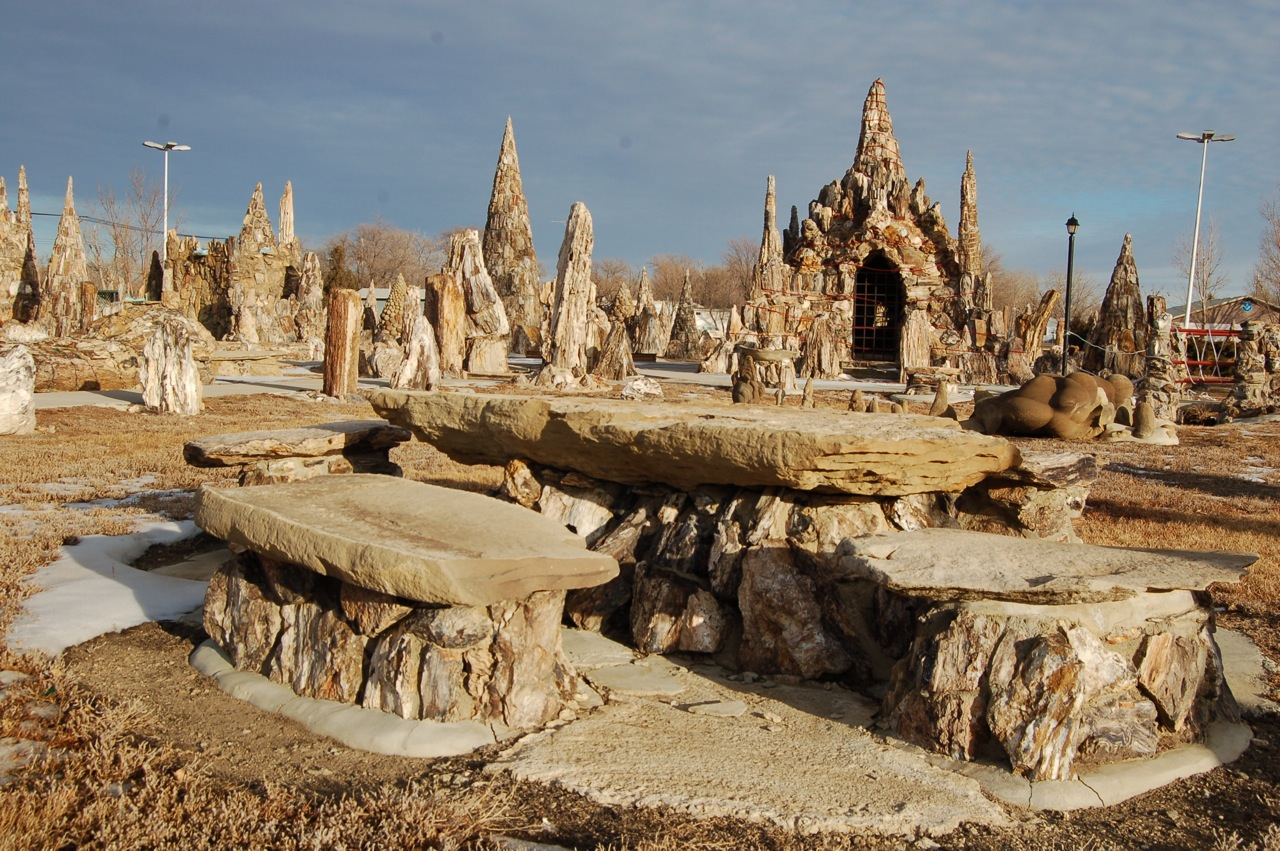
A bench made of petrified wood, with the Castle in the background

The museum was not completed until late 1933. Both Ole and David Quammen died in 1934. Alice Quammen took over management until 1954, when she transferred the land to the City of Lemmon on the condition that the park not be altered. Since then, the only major change to the park—despite the loss of some material over the years due to theft—has been an addition to the museum in 1989.

In 1961, the Lemmon Chamber of Commerce donated a 200-pound petrified log to White Gardens in St. Petersburg, Florida, for inclusion in its Walk of States mosaic. To keep the park's collection intact, the specimen was not actually from the park, but was instead collected from the same area.

The park reportedly had 17,000 visitors in 1971 alone. In 1984, reports still claimed an annual visitor count over 12,000.

The park was listed on the National Register of Historic Places (NRHP) on November 21, 1977, for its historic value to Lemmon as a major tourist attraction and an important contributor to its early development.

== Description ==
At the time of its NRHP nomination, Lemmon Petrified Wood Park claimed to be the largest petrified wood park in the world. It takes up one 3-acre (1.2 ha) block in the center of downtown Lemmon, South Dakota, and is bounded by Main Avenue (U.S. 12) to the west, 5th Street East to the north, 1st Avenue East to the east, and 6th Avenue East to the south. Originally, the park sat alongside the Yellowstone Trail until it was later diverted south. The park is open annually during summer between Memorial Day and Labor Day and is free admission.

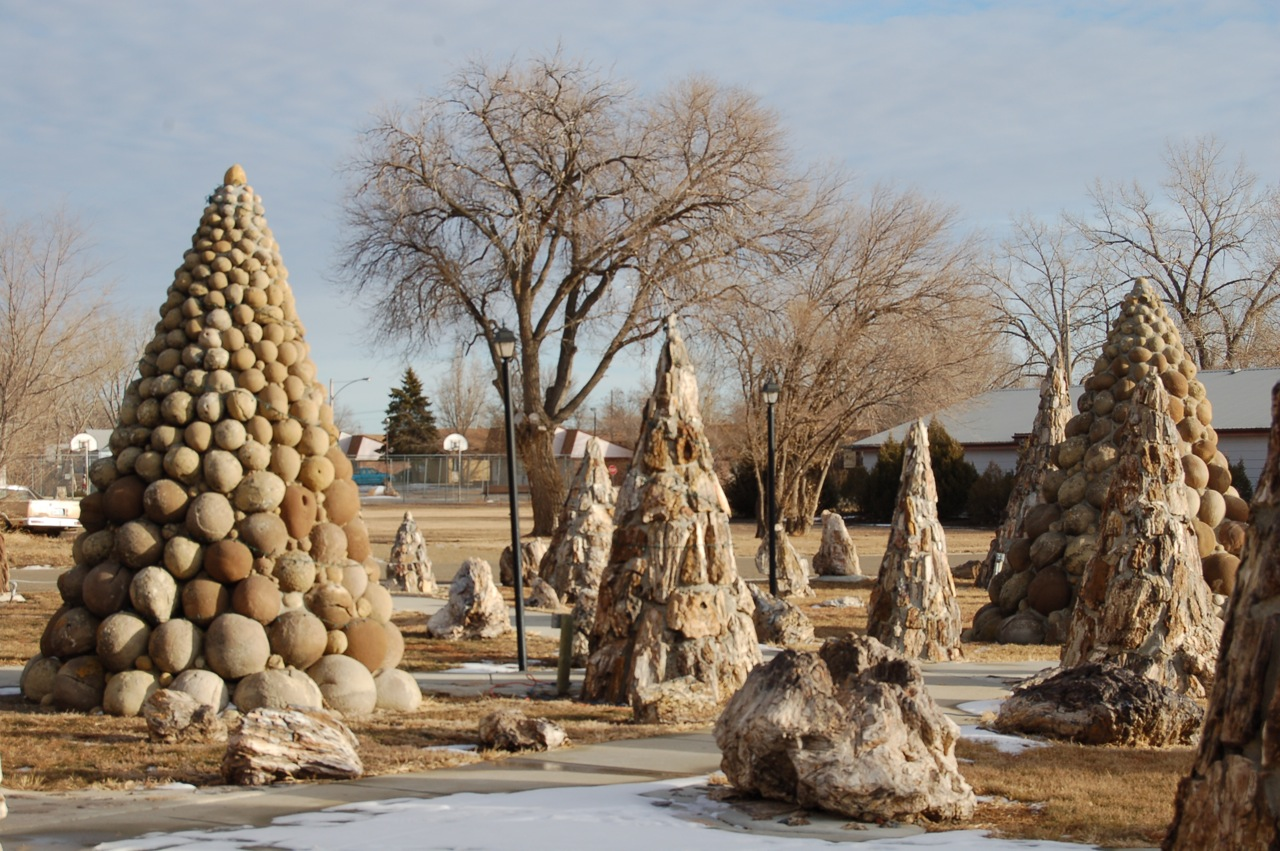
Pyramids of petrified wood are a major feature of the park.

Upon completion, the park featured 4,100 tons of petrified wood and 300 tons of petrified grass, all collected within a 25-mile (40 km) radius of Lemmon in both North and South Dakota. However, as some original material has been stolen or destroyed over the years, the park now only contains 3,200 tons of petrified wood and 100 tons of petrified grass. Many of these samples have been cemented together into abstract forms; other samples have been left intact and are displayed as found. This includes pedestals topped by cannonball concretions, spires, and entire logs. 100 towers made of the stacked cannonball concretions and logs are dotted throughout the park; the smallest of these pyramids is 8 feet (2.4 m) tall, while the largest is 32 feet (9.8 m) tall and is 55 feet (17 m) in circumference. Other cannonballs have been placed atop pillars.

=== Buildings ===
Three buildings exist on the site, likewise constructed out of petrified fossils: the Castle, the museum, and a now-disused gas station. All of these were included as contributing buildings and structures on the NRHP listing.

The octagonal Castle sits at the center of the park and was created out of 300 tons of material, and its surfaces feature the fossilized remains of dinosaurs, snakes, and bird tracks. It consists of a large central spire, and each wall has four smaller spires. The gas station, after its closing, was temporarily used as a headquarters for the Lemmon Chamber of Commerce.

The museum building, originally octagonal, is now dumbbell-shaped after the addition of a second wing in 1989. The original chamber measures 66 ft (20 m) by 56 ft (17 m) at its widest points and has a 13 ft (4.0 m) ceiling. Its floor is made of petrified glass, and the centerpiece is a fireplace made of fossils. Inside are displays of fossil bones and teeth also collected by Quammen, as well as relics of Lemmon's pioneer past, including firearms, saddles, taxidermy and hunting trophies, and other 20th-century artifacts.

== Paleontology and geology ==
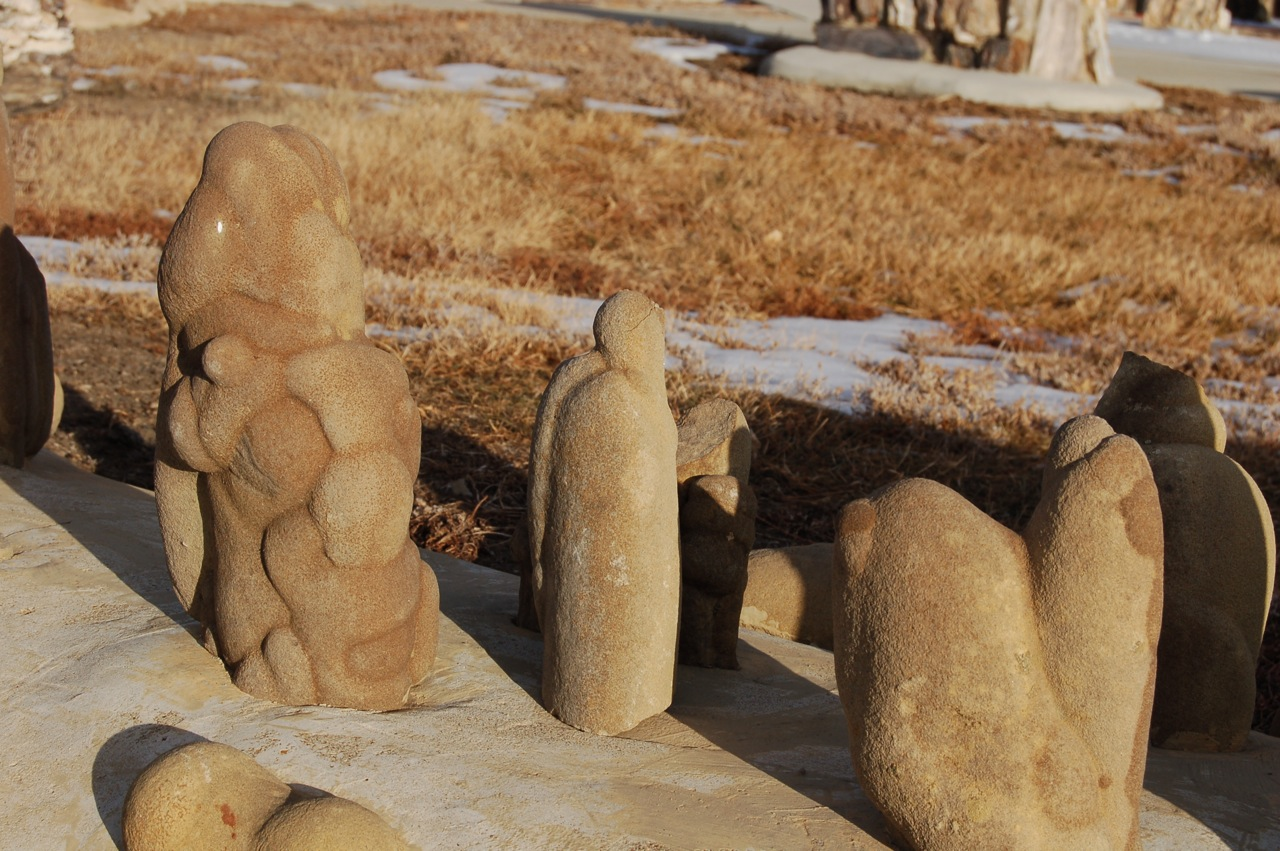
Natural concretions on display

During the Mesozoic era, about 252–66 million years ago (Ma), this area of the Great Plains was a freshwater swamp with thick jungles of vegetation. As the result of climate change during the Paleocene epoch about 66–56 Ma, the area was inundated by a shallow sea. The Mesozoic plant—and some animal—matter, buried underneath the sea, was concreted and preserved by mineral deposits carried underground by the seawater.

The petrified vegetation was retrieved from the Fox Hills Formation and Pierre Formation, Cretaceous layers of rock that formed underneath the ancient sea bed. Many of the petrified wood specimens contain trace fossils of snails, fish, and plants. Other specimens collected by Quammen and his team include preserved dinosaur, bison, and other faunal bones; invertebrate shells; and fossilized leaves.

Several cannonball concretions were recovered from the Cannonball River just across the state border in North Dakota, naturally rounded by the movement of the river.

== Gallery ==
Several postcards were produced by the Tichnor Brothers between 1930 and 1945 to advertise the park.

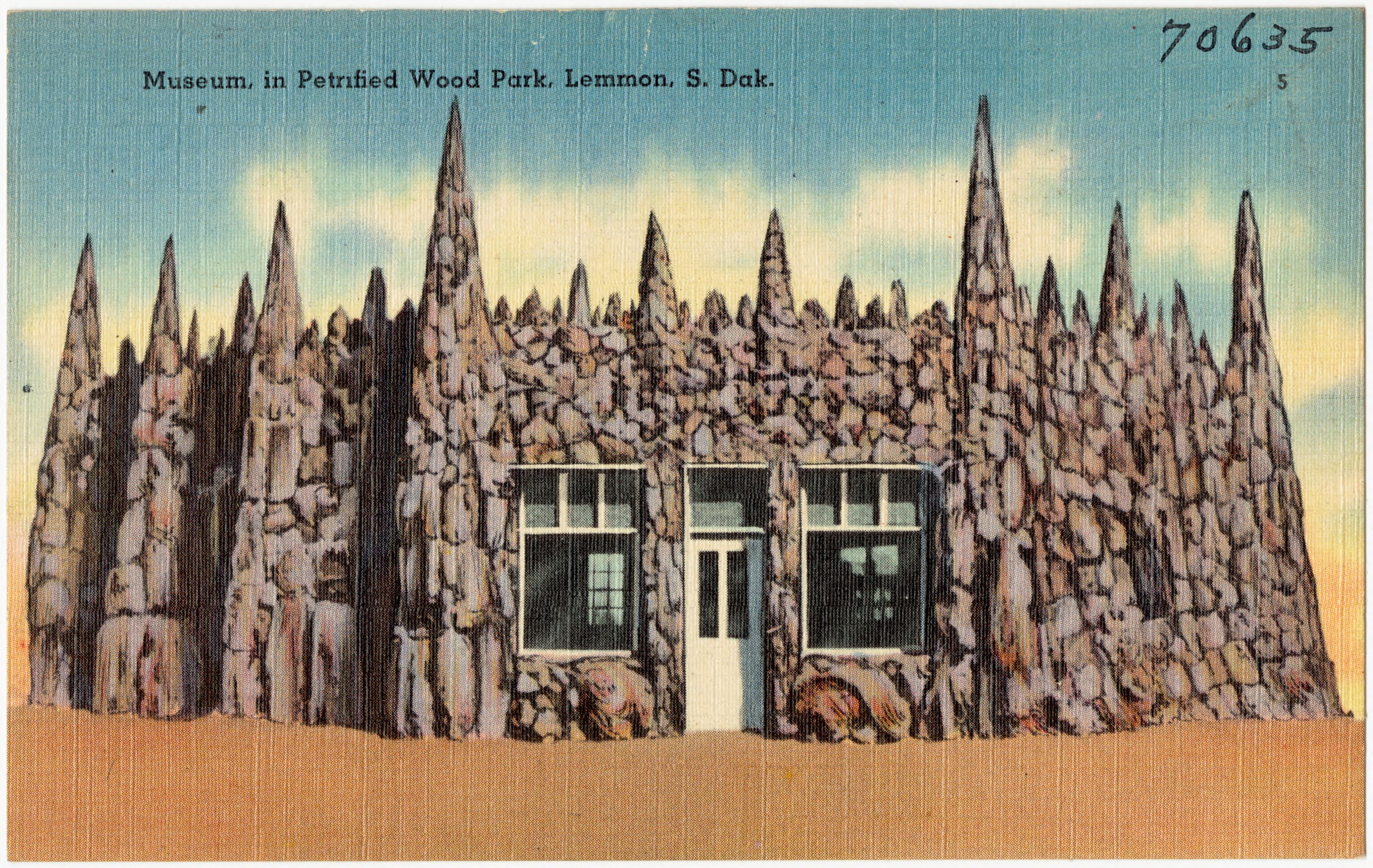
Museum

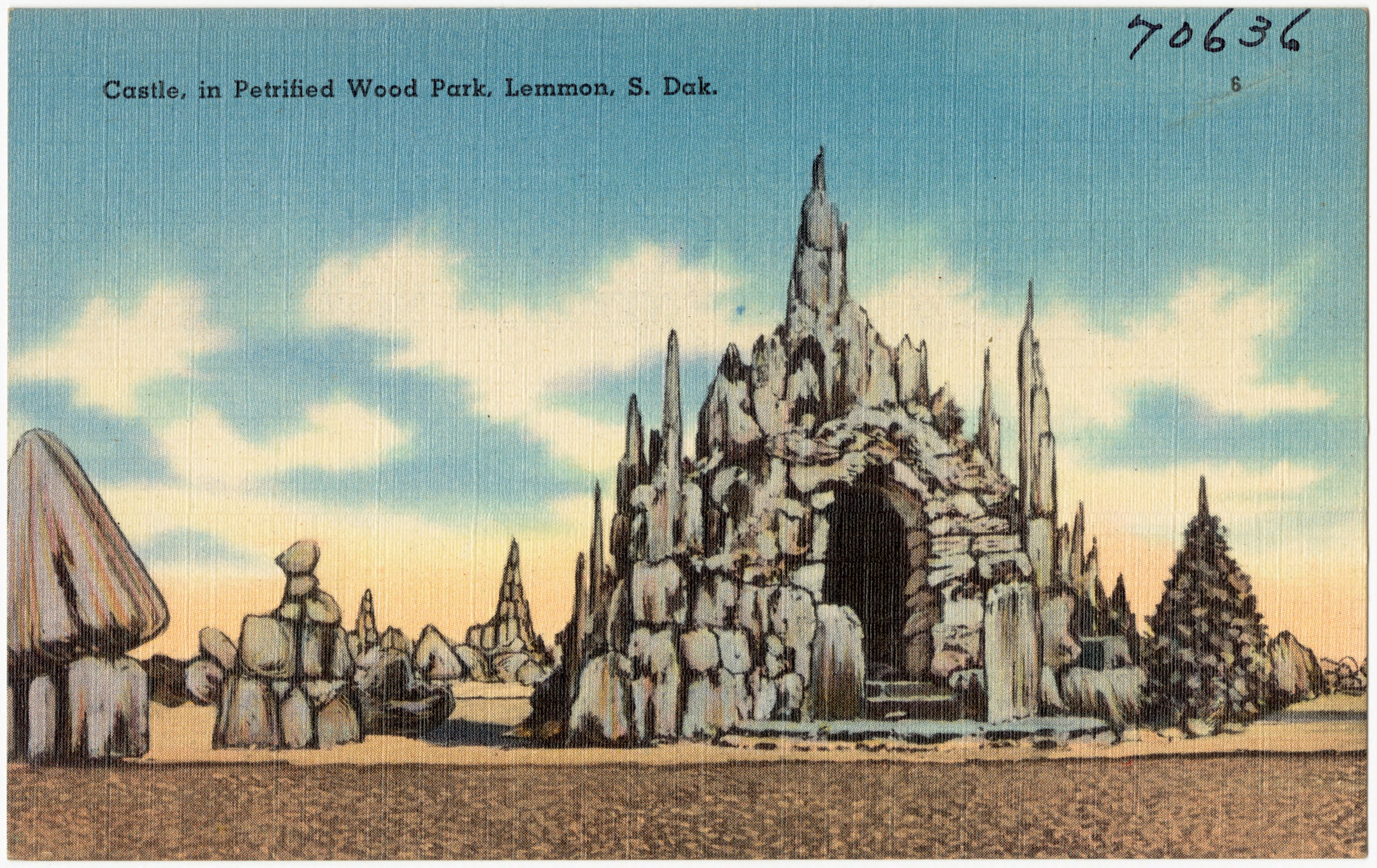
Castle

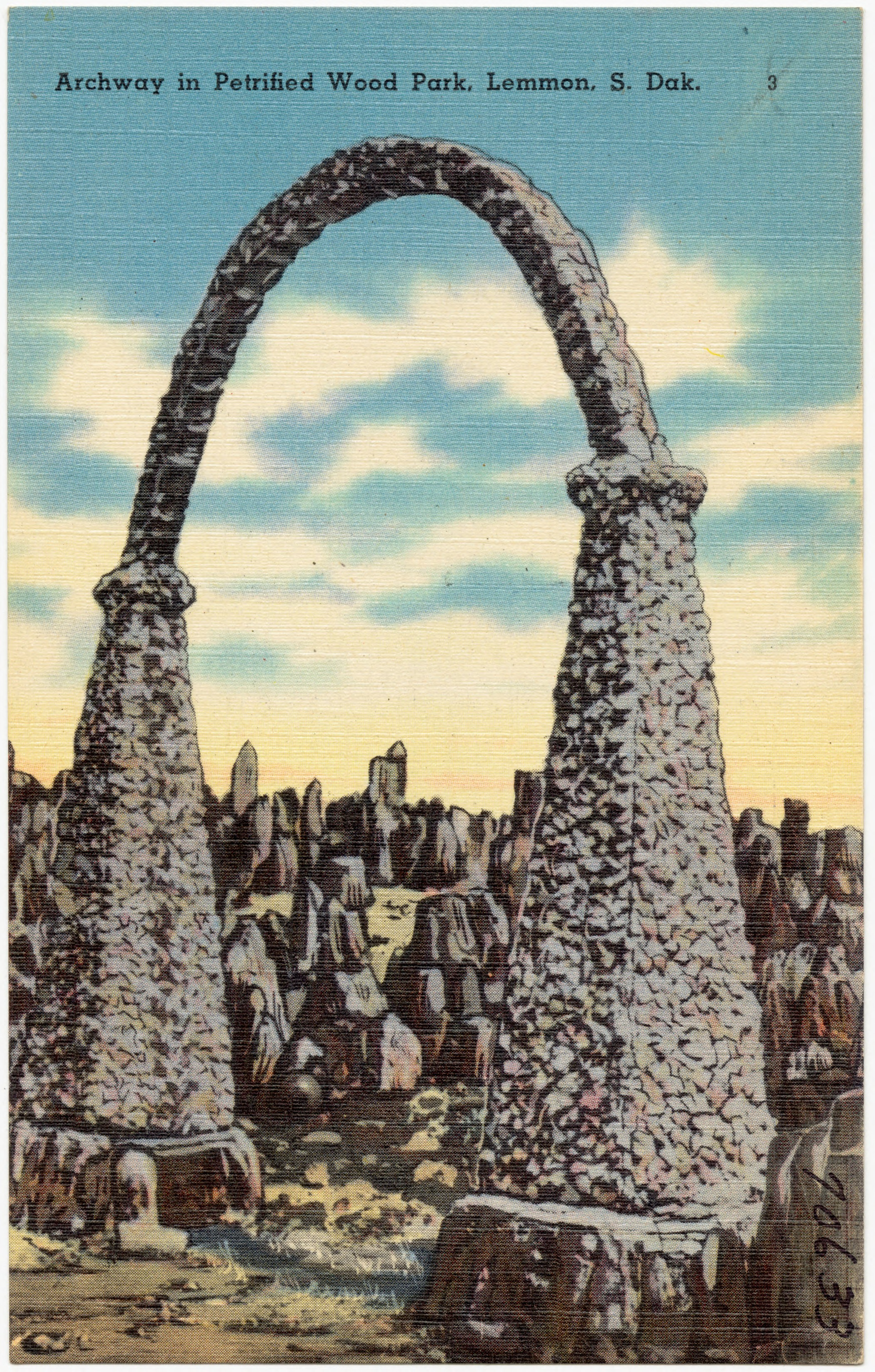
Archway

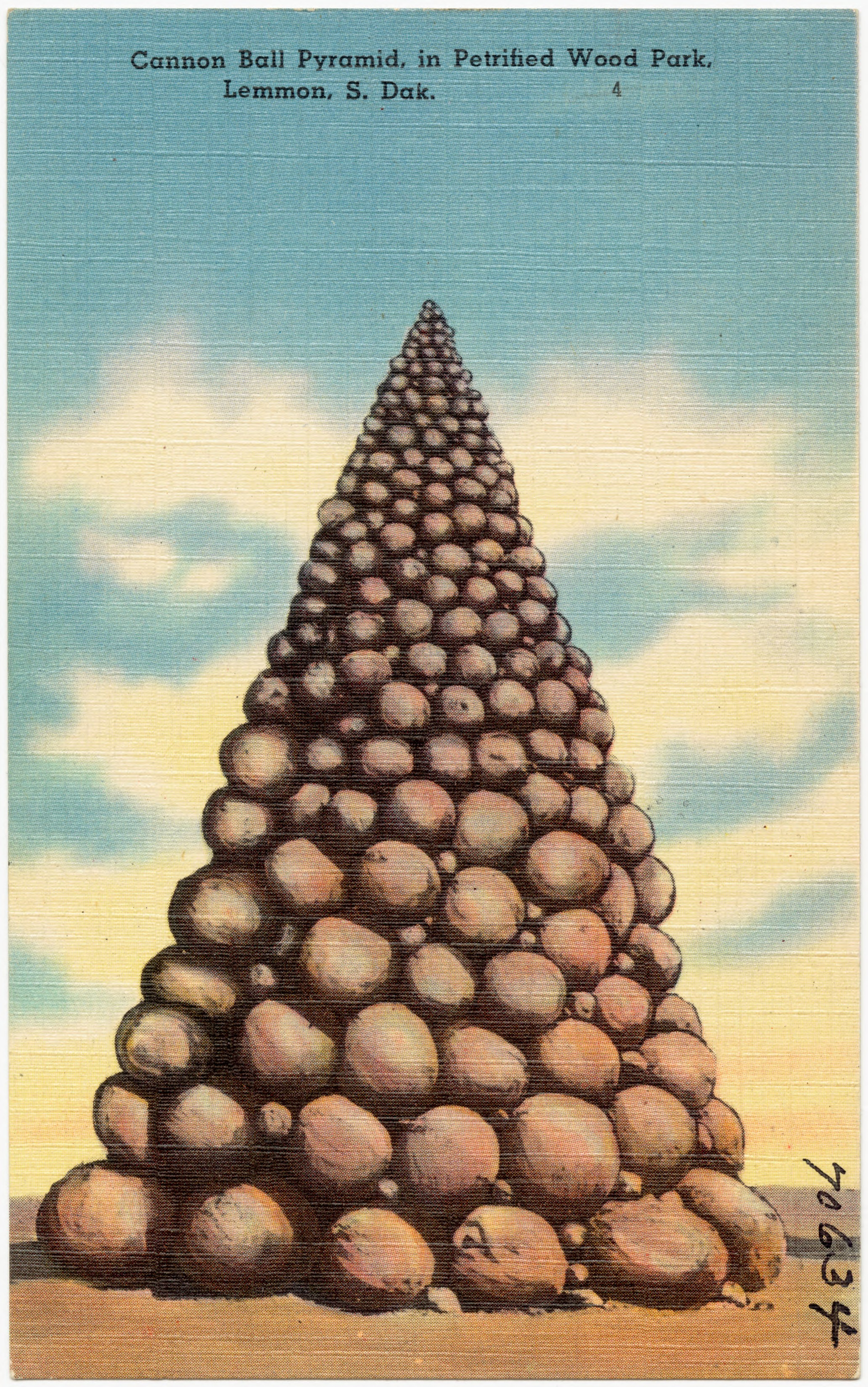
Cannonball pyramid

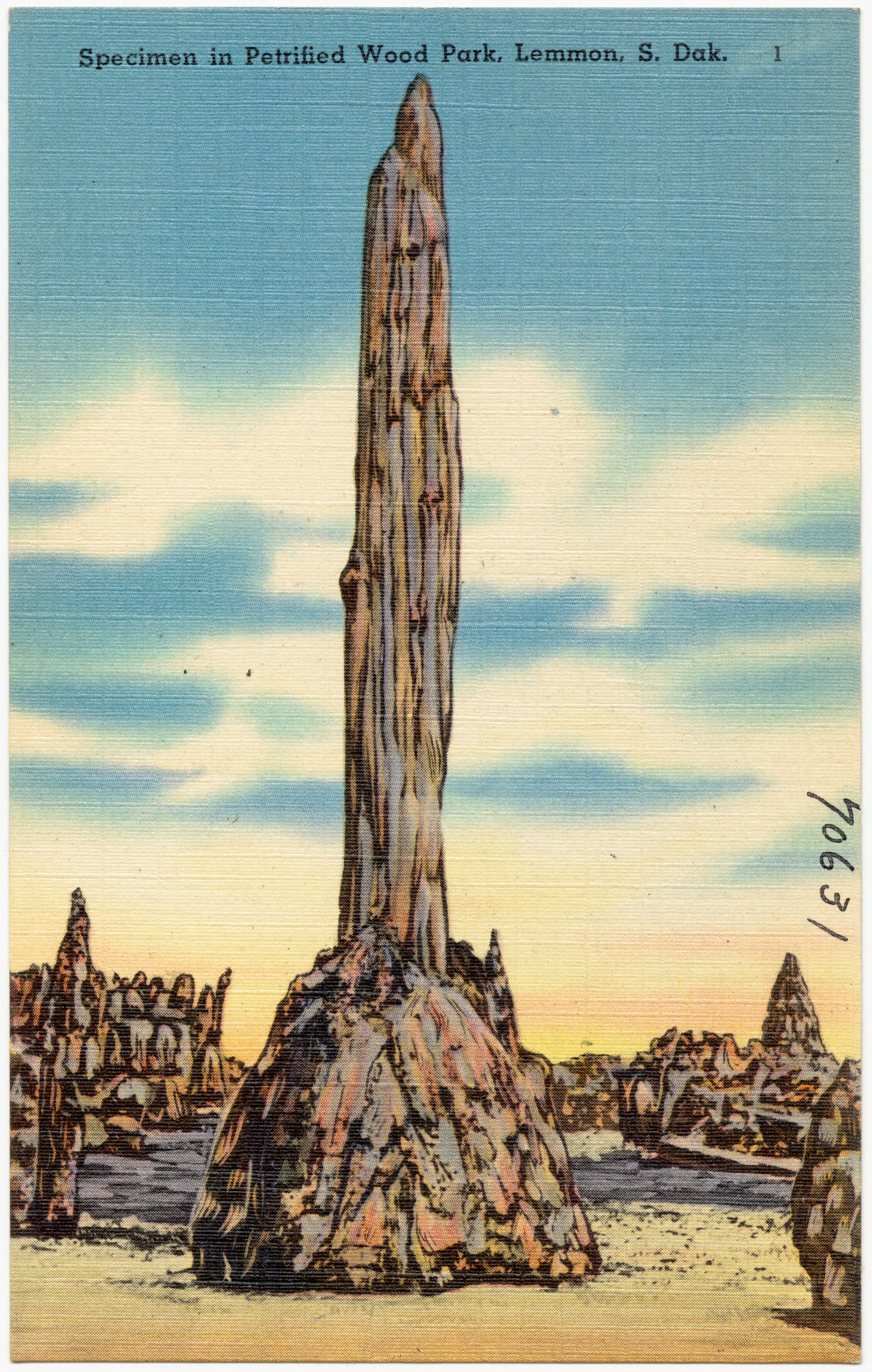
Spire
