= Peggy Detmers =

American sculptor

- Education: South Dakota State University (B.S., biology, wildlife/fisheries management)
- Known for: sculpture in metal
- Notable work: Lakota Bison Jump: 17 bronze statues of mounted American Indians driving a buffalo herd off a cliff

Peggy Detmers is an American sculptor of metal. She specializes in bronze wildlife, and displays her work at international wildlife shows. Detmers is a fourth-generation South Dakotan. She graduated from South Dakota State University in 1980 with a Bachelor of Science in biology and wildlife and fisheries management. Detmers lives and works in Rapid City, South Dakota.

In 2012, Peggy Detmers lost a legal battle with actor Kevin Costner. She created Lakota Bison Jump, 17 large multimillion-dollar bronze statues of mounted American Indians driving a buffalo herd off a cliff. The statues were meant to be a centerpiece of 'The Dunbar', a Deadwood, South Dakota resort developed by Costner. The resort was never created and Detmers sued for breach of contract. The case reached the South Dakota Supreme Court. The sculpture is now part of an interpretive center called 'Tatanka: Story of the Bison'.
