= Immanuel Lutheran Church (Zeona, South Dakota) =

Historic church in South Dakota, United States

- U.S. National Register of Historic Places
- Location within South Dakota Location within the United States
- Nearest city: Zeona, South Dakota
- Coordinates: 45°11′38″N 102°55′4″W
- Area: 2 acres (0.81 ha)
- Built: 1923
- MPS: Harding and Perkins Counties MRA
- NRHP reference No.: 87000555
- Added to NRHP: April 10, 1987

Immanuel Lutheran Church is a historic church in rural Perkins County, South Dakota. It is situated near the community of Zeona, South Dakota. The church was built in 1923. It was added to the National Register of Historic Places in 1987.
