= Zeona, South Dakota =

Zeona
- Former settlement
- Location in South Dakota Location within United States
- Coordinates: 45°11′36″N 102°54′50″W
- Country: United States
- State: South Dakota
- County: Perkins County
- Established: 1910
- Founder: H. E. Rowson
- Elevation: 2,694 ft (821 m)
- GNIS feature ID: 1259104

Zeona is an extinct town in Perkins County, in the U.S. state of South Dakota. The GNIS classifies it as a populated place.

== History ==
Zeona was laid out in 1910, close to Spring Creek and the Moreau River. There are multiple stories about the origins of the settlement's name: local legend attributes it to a handwriting mishap by H.E. Rowson, one of the founders, who intended to name the town after his daughter Leona. The Federal Writers' Project recorded that the settlers wanted something "unusual and different."

The official population history of Zeona is unclear. The area's population was not recorded in the United States Census, and Zeona was mostly populated by homesteaders, who were more likely to migrate to other regions. Additionally, the Great Plains region was struck by drought only a year after Zeona was founded, driving many early settlers to leave. Documents from the establishment of Zeona's first post office in 1911 place the population at about 225 people, while postal records from 1935 place the population at 79, and the Federal Writers' Project placed the 1940 population at 6.

Norwegian homesteaders made up a sizable portion of the village, and were hosting community church services as early as 1913. In 1923, the Immanuel Lutheran Church was built to establish a place of community, both for the Norwegian Lutherans and other villagers. Six years later, in 1929, the post office was discontinued, and Zeona's mail was rerouted to Strool.

The post office was reestablished in 1936.

Several buildings in Zeona were added to the National Register of Historic Places in 1987, including the Immanuel Lutheran Church, the Donald Beckon Ranch, and the Spring Creek School.

Like many other rural South Dakota communities, the village's population had significantly declined by the late 20th century, owing to changing agricultural practices, increased accessibility to transportation, and smaller family sizes. Zeona's post office and its 57795 ZIP code were discontinued in February 1998, with its postal services merged into the nearby Mud Butte. As of 2019, the church was still in use.

== See also ==
- Immanuel Lutheran Church (Zeona, South Dakota)
