= Hart Creek (South Dakota) =

Stream in South Dakota, United States

Hart Creek is a stream in Perkins County in the U.S. state of South Dakota. It is a tributary to Thunder Butte Creek.

The headwaters arise at 45°32′01″N 102°19′42″W an elevation of 2770 feet about six miles east of Bison and just north of South Dakota Highway 20 and southeast of the Boxcar Buttes area.

The confluence with Thunder Butte Creek is just south of the community of Chance at 45°24′39″N 102°17′01″W and an elevation of 2507 feet.

Hart Creek was named after an early settler.

== See also ==
- List of rivers of South Dakota
