= Chance, South Dakota =

Unincorporated community in South Dakota, U.S.

Coordinates: 45°24′36″N 102°16′53″W

Chance is an unincorporated community in Perkins County, in the U.S. state of South Dakota. The community is just northeast of the confluence of Hart Creek and Thunder Butte Creek.

== History ==
A post office called Chance was established in 1901, and remained in operation until 1958. The name may be derived from the local Chance Ranch, or according to tradition, because petitioners for the post office saw "little chance" their efforts would succeed. The town once had a newspaper, The Chance Record.
