= Lodgepole, South Dakota =

- unincorporated community
- Interactive map of Lodgepole, South Dakota
- Coordinates: 45°48′17″N 102°39′39″W
- Country: United States
- State: South Dakota
- County: Perkins

Area
  - Total: 36.1 sq mi (93.4 km^{2})
  - Land: 36.0 sq mi (93.3 km^{2})
  - Water: 0.039 sq mi (0.1 km^{2})
- Elevation: 2,792 ft (851 m)

Population (2000)
  - Total: 42
  - Density: 1.3/sq mi (0.5/km^{2})
- Time zone: UTC-7 (Mountain (MST))
  - Summer (DST): UTC-6 (MDT)
- ZIP code: 57640
- Area code: 605
- FIPS code: 46-38100
- GNIS feature ID: 1256189

Lodgepole is an unincorporated community in Perkins County, South Dakota, United States.

The community took its name from Lodgepole Creek. It is surrounded on three sides by the Grand River National Grassland, although the tracts are not contiguous.

== Climate ==
Lodgepole has a dry-winter humid continental climate (Köppen Dwb).

Climate data for Lodgepole 5SW, South Dakota, 1991–2020 normals, 2008-2023 extremes: 2570ft (783m)
| Month | Jan | Feb | Mar | Apr | May | Jun | Jul | Aug | Sep | Oct | Nov | Dec | Year |
|---|---|---|---|---|---|---|---|---|---|---|---|---|---|
| Record high °F (°C) | 65 (18) | 67 (19) | 79 (26) | 90 (32) | 89 (32) | 104 (40) | 105 (41) | 102 (39) | 100 (38) | 91 (33) | 77 (25) | 69 (21) | 105 (41) |
| Mean maximum °F (°C) | 50.7 (10.4) | 52.7 (11.5) | 66.0 (18.9) | 77.5 (25.3) | 84.1 (28.9) | 90.4 (32.4) | 95.3 (35.2) | 96.3 (35.7) | 92.5 (33.6) | 80.3 (26.8) | 67.6 (19.8) | 54.1 (12.3) | 97.7 (36.5) |
| Mean daily maximum °F (°C) | 27.8 (−2.3) | 30.8 (−0.7) | 42.6 (5.9) | 54.4 (12.4) | 64.9 (18.3) | 74.3 (23.5) | 82.1 (27.8) | 82.1 (27.8) | 73.1 (22.8) | 56.6 (13.7) | 42.1 (5.6) | 30.9 (−0.6) | 55.1 (12.9) |
| Daily mean °F (°C) | 16.4 (−8.7) | 18.7 (−7.4) | 29.3 (−1.5) | 39.7 (4.3) | 50.6 (10.3) | 60.7 (15.9) | 66.9 (19.4) | 65.6 (18.7) | 56.4 (13.6) | 41.7 (5.4) | 28.0 (−2.2) | 18.8 (−7.3) | 41.1 (5.0) |
| Mean daily minimum °F (°C) | 4.9 (−15.1) | 6.6 (−14.1) | 15.9 (−8.9) | 24.9 (−3.9) | 36.3 (2.4) | 47.0 (8.3) | 51.7 (10.9) | 49.1 (9.5) | 39.8 (4.3) | 26.8 (−2.9) | 13.9 (−10.1) | 6.7 (−14.1) | 27.0 (−2.8) |
| Mean minimum °F (°C) | −20.1 (−28.9) | −21.7 (−29.8) | −8.1 (−22.3) | 6.3 (−14.3) | 19.3 (−7.1) | 33.1 (0.6) | 40.3 (4.6) | 36.8 (2.7) | 27.8 (−2.3) | 8.7 (−12.9) | −6.5 (−21.4) | −17.3 (−27.4) | −27.6 (−33.1) |
| Record low °F (°C) | −30 (−34) | −40 (−40) | −25 (−32) | −7 (−22) | 13 (−11) | 28 (−2) | 34 (1) | 30 (−1) | 19 (−7) | −14 (−26) | −28 (−33) | −32 (−36) | −40 (−40) |
| Average precipitation inches (mm) | 0.19 (4.8) | 0.34 (8.6) | 0.65 (17) | 1.41 (36) | 2.48 (63) | 3.50 (89) | 2.34 (59) | 2.09 (53) | 1.49 (38) | 1.56 (40) | 0.53 (13) | 0.28 (7.1) | 16.86 (428.5) |
| Average snowfall inches (cm) | 5.0 (13) | 4.6 (12) | 7.3 (19) | 8.3 (21) | 2.5 (6.4) | 0.0 (0.0) | 0.0 (0.0) | 0.0 (0.0) | 0.9 (2.3) | 2.7 (6.9) | 7.7 (20) | 6.3 (16) | 45.3 (116.6) |
| Average precipitation days (≥ 0.01 in) | 2.2 | 3.0 | 4.0 | 6.1 | 8.3 | 8.5 | 6.1 | 5.8 | 3.6 | 5.4 | 1.9 | 3.3 | 58.2 |
| Average snowy days (≥ 0.1 in) | 2.3 | 2.2 | 3.3 | 2.1 | 0.4 | 0.0 | 0.0 | 0.0 | 0.1 | 0.6 | 2.4 | 3.2 | 16.6 |
Source 1: NOAA (1981-2010 snowfall)
Source 2: XMACIS2 (temp records & monthly max/mins)
