= Lemmon, South Dakota =

- City
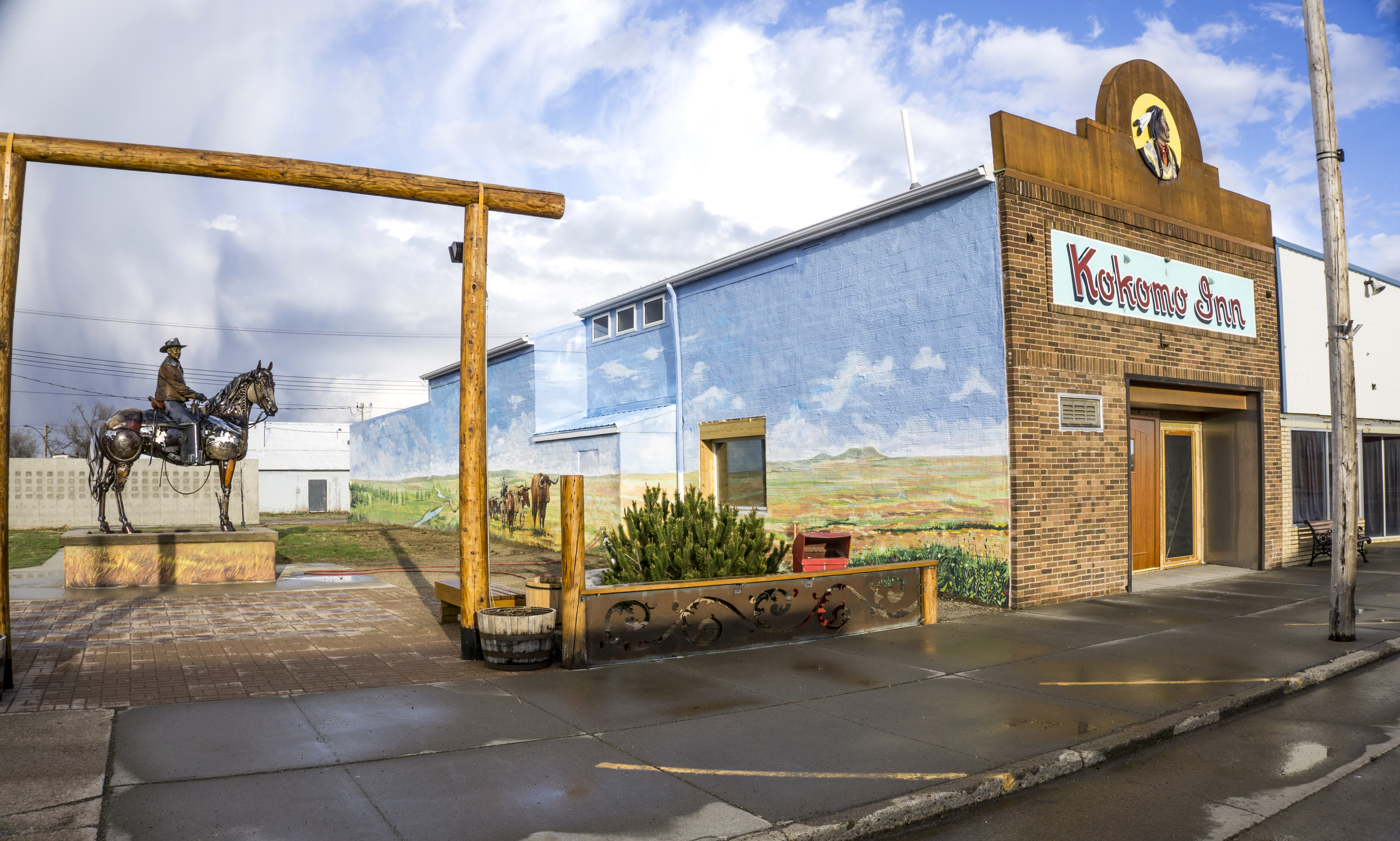
- A monument of Ed Lemmon resides in Boss Cowman Square.

- Location in Perkins County and the state of South Dakota
- Coordinates: 45°56′18″N 102°09′35″W
- Country: United States
- State: South Dakota
- County: Perkins
- Incorporated: 1908

Area
  - Total: 1.10 sq mi (2.84 km^{2})
  - Land: 1.10 sq mi (2.84 km^{2})
  - Water: 0 sq mi (0.00 km^{2})
- Elevation: 2,566 ft (782 m)

Population (2020)
  - Total: 1,160
  - Density: 1,056.9/sq mi (408.08/km^{2})
- Time zone: UTC−7 (Mountain (MST))
  - Summer (DST): UTC−6 (MDT)
- ZIP code: 57638
- Area code: 605
- FIPS code: 46-36340
- GNIS feature ID: 1267457
- Website: lemmonsd.com

Lemmon is a town in Perkins County, South Dakota, United States. The population was 1,160 at the 2020 census.

Lemmon is named after George Ed Lemmon, a cattleman, who founded the town in 1906.

The City of Lemmon received the South Dakota Community of the Year Award in 2012.

== Geography ==
According to the United States Census Bureau, the city has a total area of 1.04 square miles (2.69 km^{2}), all land.

Lemmon's north border is the Adams County, North Dakota, boundary. To the east of Lemmon is Corson County and Standing Rock Sioux Reservation.

== History ==
Lemmon's history as a town started in 1902 with the U.S. government's forced leasing of about 800,000 acres of Standing Rock Sioux Reservation lands to cattle rancher George Ed Lemmon.

In 1919, Lemmon became a sundown town, prohibiting African Americans from living there.

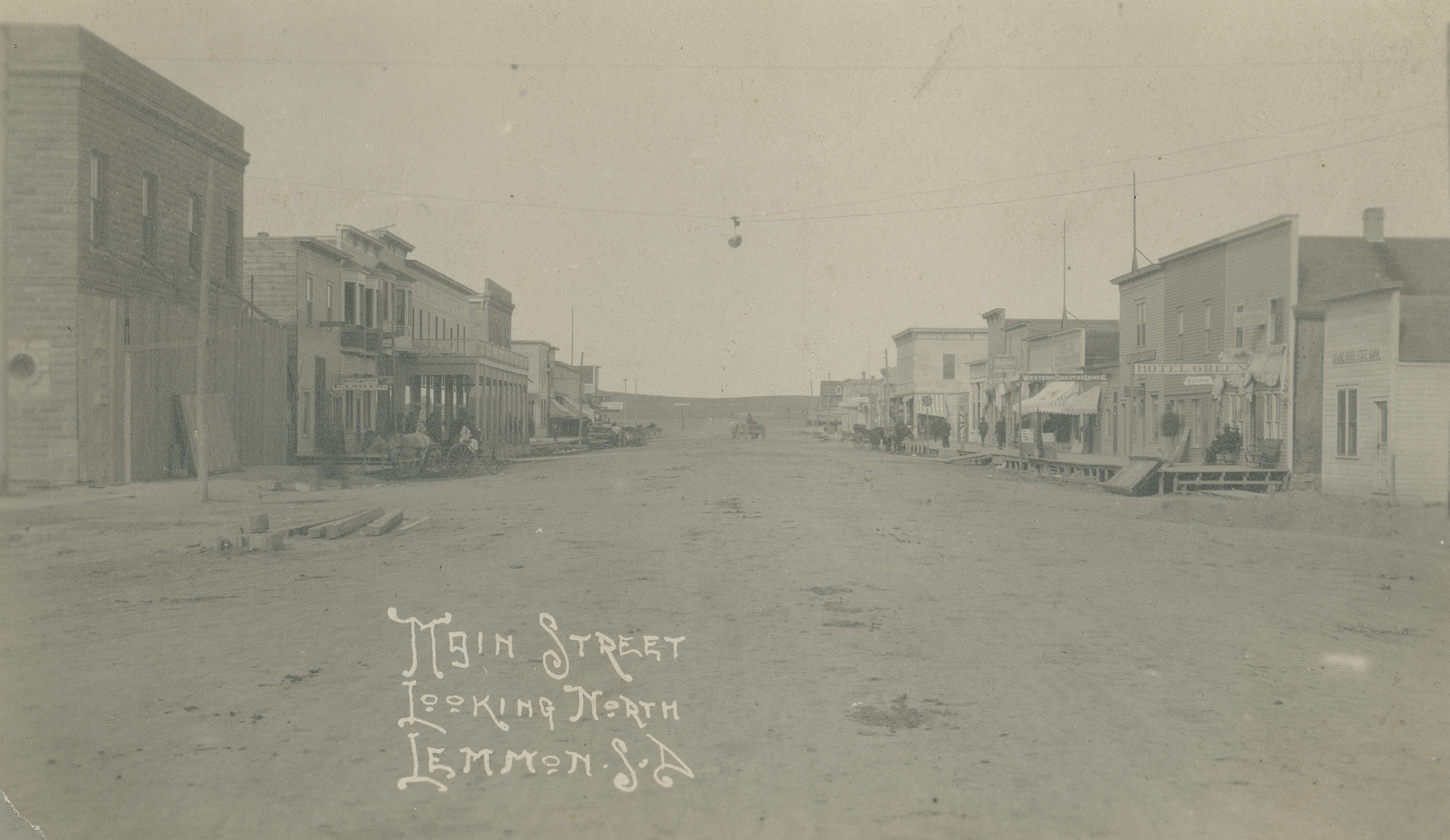
Main Street, 1890

Lemmon once had its own newspaper.

== Demographics ==
Historical population
Census	Pop.	Note	%±
1910	1,255		—
1920	1,126		−10.3%
1930	1,508		33.9%
1940	1,781		18.1%
1950	2,760		55.0%
1960	2,412		−12.6%
1970	1,997		−17.2%
1980	1,871		−6.3%
1990	1,614		−13.7%
2000	1,398		−13.4%
2010	1,227		−12.2%
2020	1,160		−5.5%
U.S. Decennial Census; 2019 Estimate

=== 2020 census ===
As of the 2020 census, Lemmon had a population of 1,160. The median age was 50.5 years. 18.2% of residents were under the age of 18 and 30.1% of residents were 65 years of age or older. For every 100 females there were 87.1 males, and for every 100 females age 18 and over there were 86.8 males age 18 and over.

0.0% of residents lived in urban areas, while 100.0% lived in rural areas.

There were 552 households in Lemmon, of which 20.5% had children under the age of 18 living in them. Of all households, 38.9% were married-couple households, 23.9% were households with a male householder and no spouse or partner present, and 31.2% were households with a female householder and no spouse or partner present. About 43.5% of all households were made up of individuals and 22.4% had someone living alone who was 65 years of age or older.

There were 707 housing units, of which 21.9% were vacant. The homeowner vacancy rate was 4.3% and the rental vacancy rate was 10.6%.

Racial composition as of the 2020 census
Race	Number	Percent
White	1,058	91.2%
Black or African American	1	0.1%
American Indian and Alaska Native	49	4.2%
Asian	3	0.3%
Native Hawaiian and Other Pacific Islander	2	0.2%
Some other race	3	0.3%
Two or more races	44	3.8%
Hispanic or Latino (of any race)	28	2.4%

=== 2010 census ===
As of the census of 2010, 1,227 people, 567 households, and 319 families resided in the city. The population density was 1,179.8 inhabitants per square mile (455.5/km^{2}). The 732 housing units averaged 703.8 per square mile (271.7/km^{2}). The racial makeup of the city was 96.3% White, 0.1% African American, 1.9% Native American, 0.2% Asian, 0.1% from other races, and 1.5% from two or more races. Hispanics or Latinos of any race were 0.7% of the population.

Of the 567 households, 20.8% had children under the age of 18 living with them, 46.7% were married couples living together, 6.9% had a female householder with no husband present, 2.6% had a male householder with no wife present, and 43.7% were not families. About 39.5% of all households were made up of individuals, and 20.7% had someone living alone who was 65 years of age or older. The average household size was 2.05 and the average family size was 2.73.

The median age in the city was 50.8 years; 17.4% of residents were under the age of 18; 5.4% were between the ages of 18 and 24; 18.3% were from 25 to 44; 31.2% were from 45 to 64; and 27.6% were 65 years of age or older. The gender makeup of the city was 47.6% male and 52.4% female.

=== 2000 census ===
As of the census of 2000, 1,398 people, 623 households, and 356 families resided in the city. The population density was 1,378.7 inhabitants per square mile (532.3/km^{2}). The 776 housing units averaged 765.3 per square mile (296.6/km^{2}). The racial makeup of the city was 95.99% White, 0.14% African American, 2.65% Native American, 0.36% Asian, 0.29% from other races, and 0.57% from two or more races. Hispanics or Latinos of any race were 0.50% of the population.

Of the 623 households, 25.2% had children under the age of 18 living with them, 47.5% were married couples living together, 7.9% had a female householder with no husband present, and 42.7% were not families. Around 40.3% of all households were made up of individuals, and 22.2% had someone living alone who was 65 years of age or older. The average household size was 2.15 and the average family size was 2.91.

In the city, the population was distributed as 22.9% under the age of 18, 6.3% from 18 to 24, 24.7% from 25 to 44, 18.7% from 45 to 64, and 27.5% who were 65 years of age or older. The median age was 42 years. For every 100 females, there were 84.2 males. For every 100 females age 18 and over, there were 81.2 males.

As of 2000, the median income for a household in the city was $28,109, and for a family was $37,813. Males had a median income of $27,426 versus $17,813 for females. The per capita income for the city was $17,272. About 8.0% of families and 12.0% of the population were below the poverty line, including 12.1% of those under age 18 and 16.0% of those age 65 or over.

== Climate ==
Lemmon has a relatively dry humid continental climate (Köppen Dwa/Dwb) characterized by very warm to hot summers with cool mornings, and freezing, dry, although extremely variable winters.

Climate data for Lemmon, South Dakota (1991–2020 normals, extremes 1909–present)
Month	Jan	Feb	Mar	Apr	May	Jun	Jul	Aug	Sep	Oct	Nov	Dec	Year
Record high °F (°C)	69 (21)	70 (21)	85 (29)	93 (34)	103 (39)	109 (43)	115 (46)	107 (42)	105 (41)	95 (35)	82 (28)	70 (21)	115 (46)
Mean maximum °F (°C)	51.2 (10.7)	53.8 (12.1)	68.0 (20.0)	78.6 (25.9)	85.1 (29.5)	92.0 (33.3)	98.0 (36.7)	97.7 (36.5)	93.3 (34.1)	82.2 (27.9)	66.2 (19.0)	53.0 (11.7)	100.1 (37.8)
Mean daily maximum °F (°C)	28.8 (−1.8)	32.6 (0.3)	45.0 (7.2)	57.7 (14.3)	69.1 (20.6)	78.7 (25.9)	86.7 (30.4)	86.0 (30.0)	76.8 (24.9)	59.8 (15.4)	43.5 (6.4)	31.9 (−0.1)	58.0 (14.4)
Daily mean °F (°C)	18.9 (−7.3)	22.3 (−5.4)	33.1 (0.6)	44.7 (7.1)	56.0 (13.3)	65.7 (18.7)	72.6 (22.6)	71.3 (21.8)	62.0 (16.7)	47.2 (8.4)	32.7 (0.4)	22.1 (−5.5)	45.7 (7.6)
Mean daily minimum °F (°C)	8.9 (−12.8)	12.0 (−11.1)	21.2 (−6.0)	31.7 (−0.2)	42.9 (6.1)	52.8 (11.6)	58.6 (14.8)	56.6 (13.7)	47.3 (8.5)	34.6 (1.4)	21.9 (−5.6)	12.3 (−10.9)	33.4 (0.8)
Mean minimum °F (°C)	−16.0 (−26.7)	−10.6 (−23.7)	−1.1 (−18.4)	14.3 (−9.8)	28.1 (−2.2)	40.8 (4.9)	48.7 (9.3)	45.0 (7.2)	32.0 (0.0)	16.2 (−8.8)	2.9 (−16.2)	−10.9 (−23.8)	−20.5 (−29.2)
Record low °F (°C)	−42 (−41)	−45 (−43)	−27 (−33)	−6 (−21)	10 (−12)	29 (−2)	37 (3)	31 (−1)	14 (−10)	−10 (−23)	−24 (−31)	−33 (−36)	−45 (−43)
Average precipitation inches (mm)	0.26 (6.6)	0.48 (12)	0.79 (20)	1.71 (43)	2.84 (72)	3.03 (77)	2.75 (70)	2.11 (54)	1.48 (38)	1.54 (39)	0.60 (15)	0.41 (10)	18.00 (457)
Average snowfall inches (cm)	4.5 (11)	7.6 (19)	7.5 (19)	4.8 (12)	0.7 (1.8)	0.0 (0.0)	0.0 (0.0)	0.0 (0.0)	0.0 (0.0)	3.1 (7.9)	5.2 (13)	8.9 (23)	42.3 (107)
Average precipitation days (≥ 0.01 in)	3.6	3.9	4.6	6.9	9.3	10.2	8.6	6.5	5.6	5.9	3.7	3.7	72.5
Average snowy days (≥ 0.1 in)	3.6	4.0	3.3	1.8	0.2	0.0	0.0	0.0	0.0	1.0	2.3	3.5	19.7
Source: NOAA

== Arts and culture ==
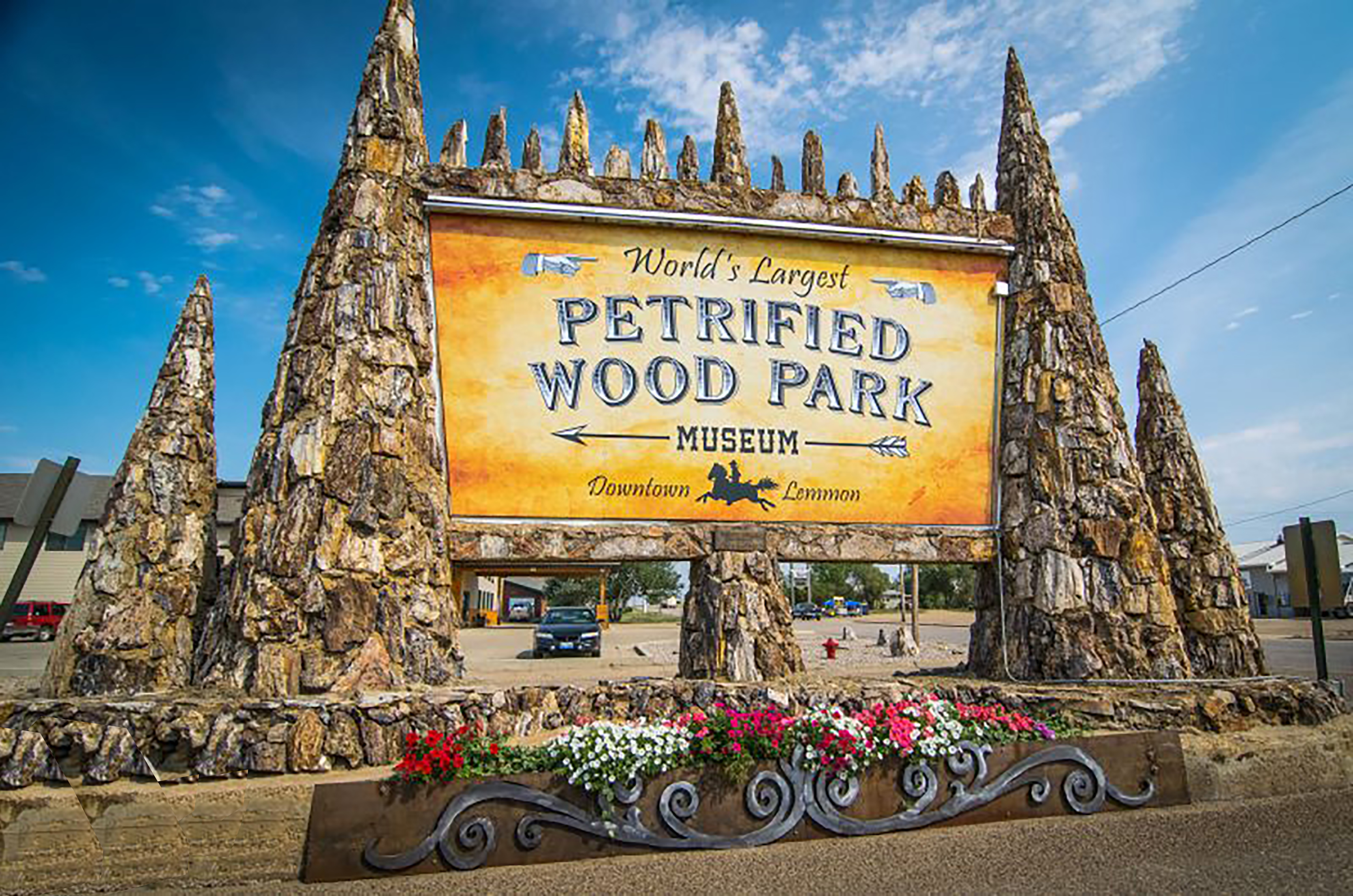
The world's largest petrified wood park

The city contains the Lemmon Petrified Park, the home of the world's largest petrified-wood park. This tourist attraction fills an entire block of the downtown area and is built entirely of petrified wood, fossils, and stone. Construction began in 1930 and continued until 1932 under the supervision of Ole S. Quammen. It was in private ownership until 1954, when it was donated to the city by Quammen's heirs. The park features a wishing well, a waterfall, and a castle. The castle weighs 300 tons and boasts towering spires and turrets. Also in the park are two separate museums, both built entirely of petrified wood. The larger of the two is circular has a petrified grass floor along with petrified logs. Dinosaur claws, bird tracks, and fossilized snakes can be seen in the petrified wood. Also in the museum are antiques and artifacts from the Lemmon area. The formations in the park number over 100 and are up to 20 ft tall.

The Boss Cowman Rodeo and Celebration is the second weekend in July, and is one of the largest rodeos in the state.

The Grand River Museum is located on Highway 12. The museum features exhibits on creation science, fossils, Native Americans, cowboys and ranch life, a full-scale tipi, and a model of the Ark. Admission is free.

The Kokomo, located on Main Street, is the home of sculptor John Lopez's art gallery.

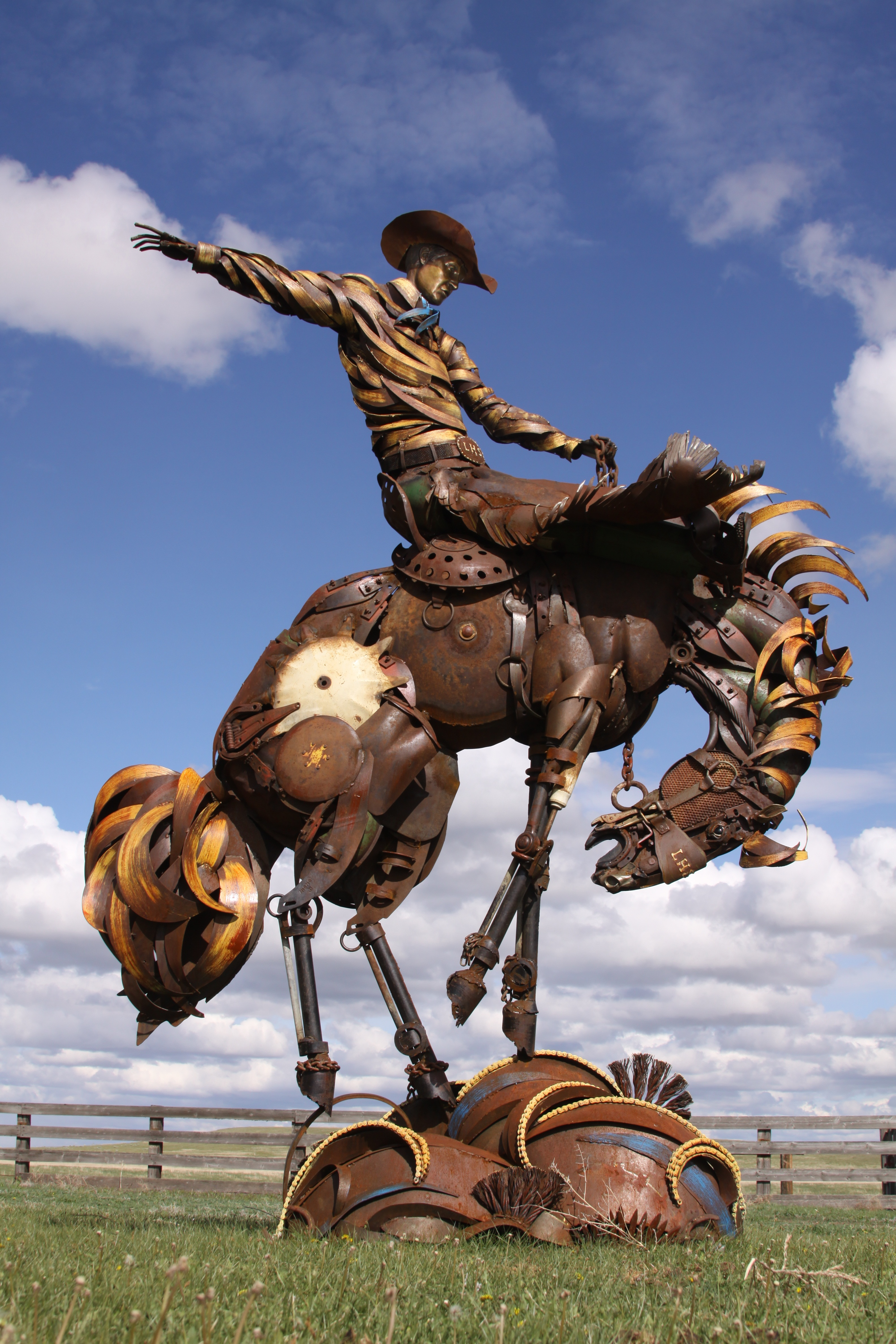
This life-sized sculpture of the Lemmon High School's mascot stands in front of the high school.

Lemmon has a 9-hole golf course, an airport, two convenience stores, a hardware store, a grocery store, an American Legion, and many other businesses. Lemmon also has seven churches, three financial institutions, a library, a movie theater, a clinic, and nursing home. Three motels are in town. The Lemmon Livestock Sale Barn is just to the west of town, with sales every Wednesday.

Many citizens are employed at Wheeler Manufacturing, which produces jewelry products. Gregorian, Inc. and Dakota Woodcrafts also employ manufacturing workers. Other major employers are the school system and farm/ranches.

== Government ==
The current (2023) mayor of Lemmon is Matt Barnes who was elected in 2022 to replace outgoing mayor Neal Pinnow, who is now a member of the South Dakota House of Representative for District 28B . The city council has 6 members and the mayor for a total of 7. The Lemmon Police Department was absorbed by the Perkins County Sheriffs Department, and now has three deputies, along with a SD highway patrolman stationed in Lemmon and a 30-man volunteer fire department. Lemmon is the site of the Grand River National Grassland and Cedar River National Grassland Ranger District office. The City Finance Officer and deputy finance officer are city employees who are in charge of the water and sewer bills, reading meters, running and taking notes at the city council monthly meetings, annual budgets and projects to improve the city, city property maintenance hiring, other city worker hiring, city pool, zoning and ordinances, among other responsibilities. The Lemmon Public Library, Lemmon Area Charitable and Economic Development, and the Lemmon Chamber of Commerce Office are in the same building at 303 1st Avenue West.

== Education ==
Lemmon's school district includes a high school and an elementary school. The Progress country school operated in Meadow until the summer of 2010, when it was destroyed by a tornado. The small rural school district was then consolidated into the Lemmon, Bison, and Faith districts.

== Local media ==
=== AM radio ===
AM radio stations
Frequency	Call sign	Name	Format	Owner	City
1400 AM	KBJM		Country/Classic Hits	Media Associates	Lemmon

== Notable people ==
- Kathleen Norris, poet
- Gale Cleven, WWII pilot
- John Lopez, Sculptor
- Troy Meink, Secretary of the Air Force

== See also ==
- List of sundown towns in the United States
- North Lemmon, North Dakota
