= National Register of Historic Places listings in Campbell County, South Dakota =

Location of Campbell County in South Dakota

This is a list of the National Register of Historic Places listings in Campbell County, South Dakota.

This is intended to be a complete list of the properties on the National Register of Historic Places in Campbell County, South Dakota, United States. The locations of National Register properties for which the latitude and longitude coordinates are included below, may be seen in a map.

There are 3 properties listed on the National Register in the county, including 1 National Historic Landmark.

This National Park Service list is complete through NPS recent listings posted March 14, 2025.

== Current listings ==
	Name on the Register	Image	Date listed	Location	City or town	Description
1	Pollock Depot	Pollock Depot	November 8, 1996 (#96001229)	Ave. A, southwest of Highway 10; 45°53′52″N 100°17′06″W	Pollock	
2	Vanderbilt Archeological Site	Vanderbilt Archeological Site	February 18, 1997 (#97000342)	Address restricted	Pollock	
3	Wientjes Barn and Ranch Yard	Wientjes Barn and Ranch Yard	July 30, 2013 (#13000572)	11703 299th Ave. 45°41′48″N 100°12′50″W	Mound City vicinity	

== See also ==
- List of National Historic Landmarks in South Dakota
- National Register of Historic Places listings in South Dakota
