= Vanderbilt Archeological Site =

- U.S. National Register of Historic Places
- U.S. National Historic Landmark
- Location: Address restricted
- Nearest city: Pollock, South Dakota
- Area: 18.5 acres (7.5 ha)
- NRHP reference No.: 97000342

Significant dates
- Added to NRHP: February 18, 1997
- Designated NHL: February 18, 1997

The Vanderbilt Archeological Site is an archaeological site located on the shore of Lake Oahe in Campbell County, South Dakota, near Pollock, South Dakota. The site contains the remains of a Native American Plains village which has been tentatively dated to about 1300 AD. Despite the fact that the site is subject to erosive destruction from wave action on the lake, it has been determined likely to yield significant information about the movements and living patterns of prehistoric Native Americans in the region. The site was declared a National Historic Landmark in 1997.

== Description and history ==
This site was first identified in the early 20th century as being of archaeological interest, but its location was mis-described several times before its first format evaluation in 1979. At that time, the site was identified as containing 22 depressions indicative of house rings, as well as evidence of trash pits and a midden. Field work resulted in the collection of more than 200 pieces of ceramic remains, stone chips consisting with tool work, projectile points and other stone tools, as well as the remains of bison and other fauna. The site is part of a complex of sites in the middle reaches of the Missouri River that are believed to constitute the largest assemblage of agrarian prehistoric settlements of the period in North America.

The site was visited again by archaeologists in 1990 and 1993, primarily to assess its condition in the context of repeated erosion events caused by changing water levels in the lake.

== See also ==
- List of National Historic Landmarks in South Dakota
- National Register of Historic Places listings in Campbell County, South Dakota
