= McClarem Lake =

Lake in the state of South Dakota, United States

- Location within South Dakota
- Location: Campbell County, South Dakota
- Coordinates: 45°48′15″N 100°02′47″W
- Type: lake
- Basin countries: United States
- Surface elevation: 1,670 ft (509 m)

McClarem Lake is a natural lake in South Dakota, in the United States.

McClarem Lake has the name of Charles and William McClarem, pioneers who settled there.

== See also ==
- List of lakes in South Dakota
