= Salt Lake (Campbell County, South Dakota) =

Lake in the state of South Dakota, United States

- Location within South Dakota
- Location: Campbell County, South Dakota
- Coordinates: 45°38′20″N 99°54′57″W
- Type: lake
- Basin countries: United States
- Surface elevation: 1,722 ft (525 m)

Salt Lake is a natural lake in South Dakota, in the United States.

The lake water of Salt Lake has traces of alkali salts, hence the name.

== See also ==
- List of lakes in South Dakota
