= Wientjes Barn and Ranch Yard =

- U.S. National Register of Historic Places
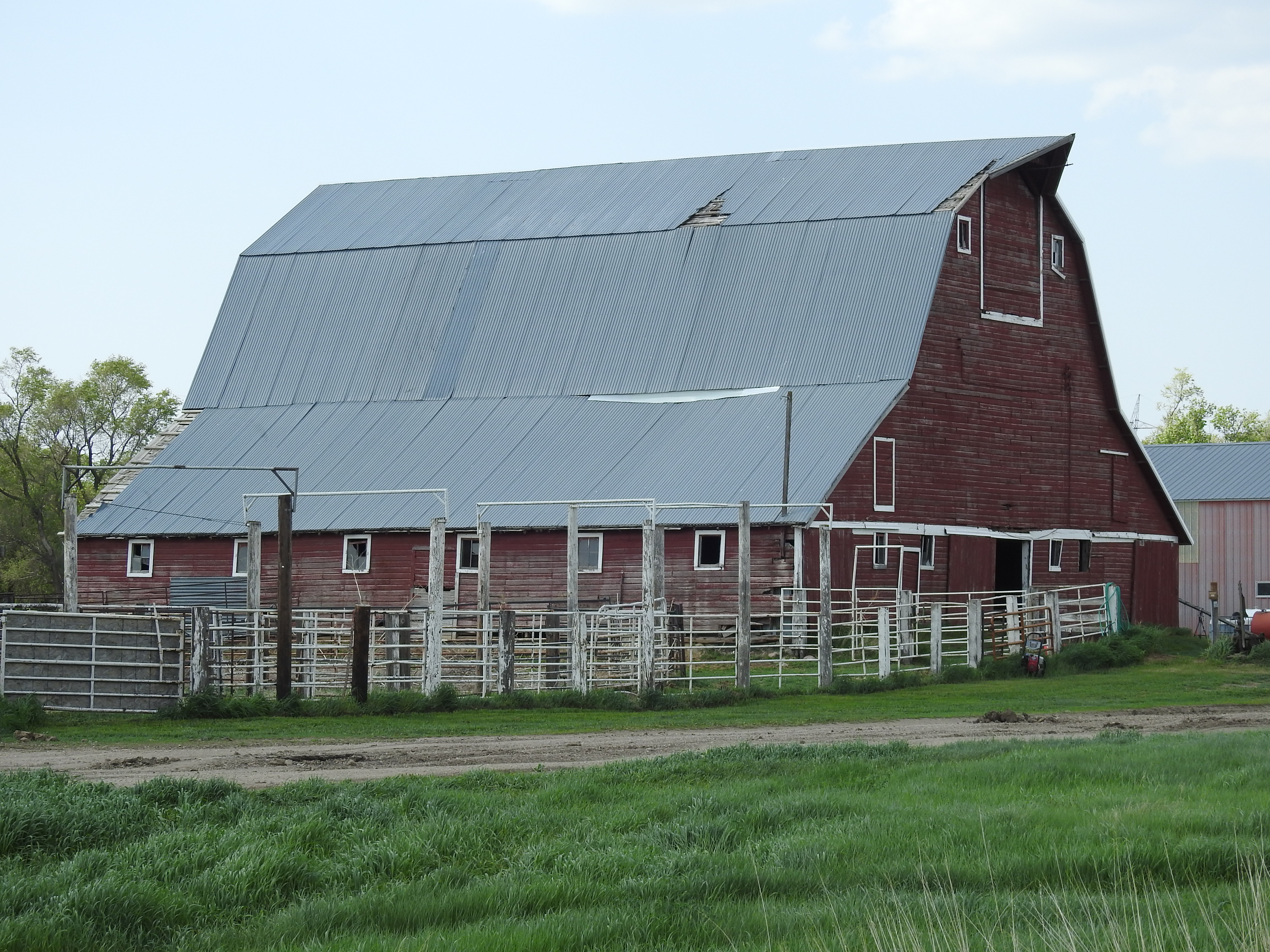

- Location within South Dakota Location within the United States
- Location: 11703 299th Ave., Mound City, South Dakota vicinity
- Coordinates: 45°41′48″N 100°12′50″W
- Area: less than one acre
- Built: 1909
- NRHP reference No.: 13000572
- Added to NRHP: July 30, 2013

The Wientjes Barn and Ranch Yard are a historic farm property in rural Campbell County, South Dakota. It consists of a barn and ranch yard located amid other farm buildings near the junction of 299th Avenue and 117th Street, west-southwest of Mound City. The barn, built in 1909, is a large wood-frame structure with a gambrel roof and integral shed extensions on the long sides, bringing the structure to a shape that is 64 feet (20 m) square. The yard is divided into several sections, with corrals south and west of the barn, with a calf shed measuring 50 by 25 feet (15.2 m × 7.6 m) where the two corrals meet. The barn was built by Claus Wientjes, a Dutch immigrant, and is a high quality example of the increasingly rare rural South Dakota barn.

The ranch yard and barn were listed on the National Register of Historic Places in 2013.
