= 1912 United States presidential election in South Dakota =

- November 5, 1912
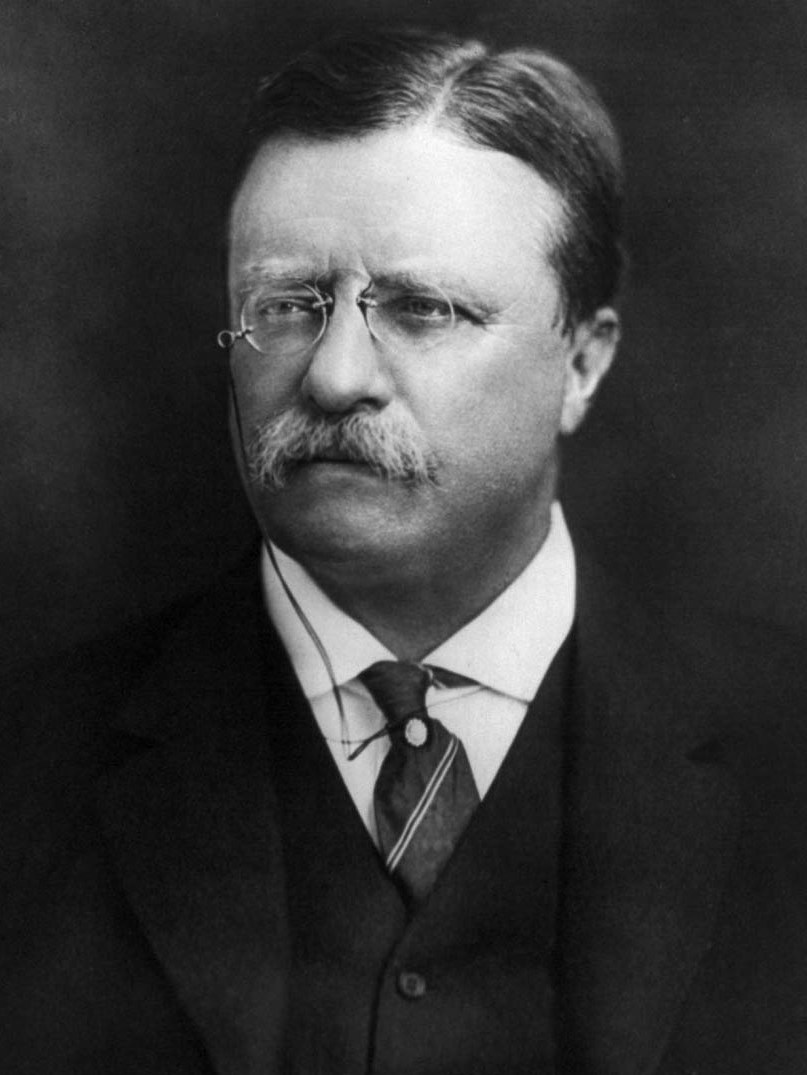

Nominee	Theodore Roosevelt	Woodrow Wilson
Party	Progressive	Democratic
Alliance	Republican
Home state	New York	New Jersey
Running mate	Hiram Johnson	Thomas R. Marshall
Electoral vote	5	0
Popular vote	58,811	48,942
Percentage	50.56%	42.07%
- County results Roosevelt 40–50% 50–60% 60–70% 70–80% Wilson 40–50% 50–60% 70–80%
President before election
William Howard Taft
Republican
Elected President
Woodrow Wilson
Democratic

The 1912 United States presidential election in South Dakota took place on November 5, 1912, as part of the 1912 United States presidential election. Voters chose five representatives, or electors, to the Electoral College, who voted for president and vice president.

South Dakota voted for the Republican nominee, former president Theodore Roosevelt, over the Democratic nominee, New Jersey Governor Woodrow Wilson, by a margin of 8.49%.

Despite incumbent president William Howard Taft winning the national Republican nomination, the South Dakota Republican Party, under the control of progressives and heavily influenced by senator Coe I. Crawford, instead nominated electors pledged to Theodore Roosevelt, with the Progressive Party not appearing on the ballot. This selection proved controversial with conservative Taft supporting Republicans who unsuccessfully attempted to overturn the decision in court. As a result, South Dakota was the only state in the 1912 election not to have president Taft either on the ballot or as a write in option (as in California). (Note: Other incumbent Presidents not on the ballot in all states have been Benjamin Harrison in Florida in 1892, Taft in California also during the 1912 election, Harry S. Truman in Alabama in 1948, and Lyndon B. Johnson also in Alabama in 1964.) The state's other senator Robert J. Gamble, who supported Taft, predicted that the anger amongst conservative Republicans was such that many would support Woodrow Wilson purely to defeat Roosevelt. Despite this Roosevelt carried the state albeit with a much reduced margin from Taft's victory in 1908.

With 50.56% of the popular vote, South Dakota would prove to be Roosevelt's strongest state in terms of popular vote percentage in the 1912 election and the only one in which he achieved a majority of the vote. This was the only non-former Confederate state to give any candidate an absolute majority of the vote.

== Primaries ==
=== Democratic Party ===
1912 South Dakota Democratic presidential primary
- June 4, 1912
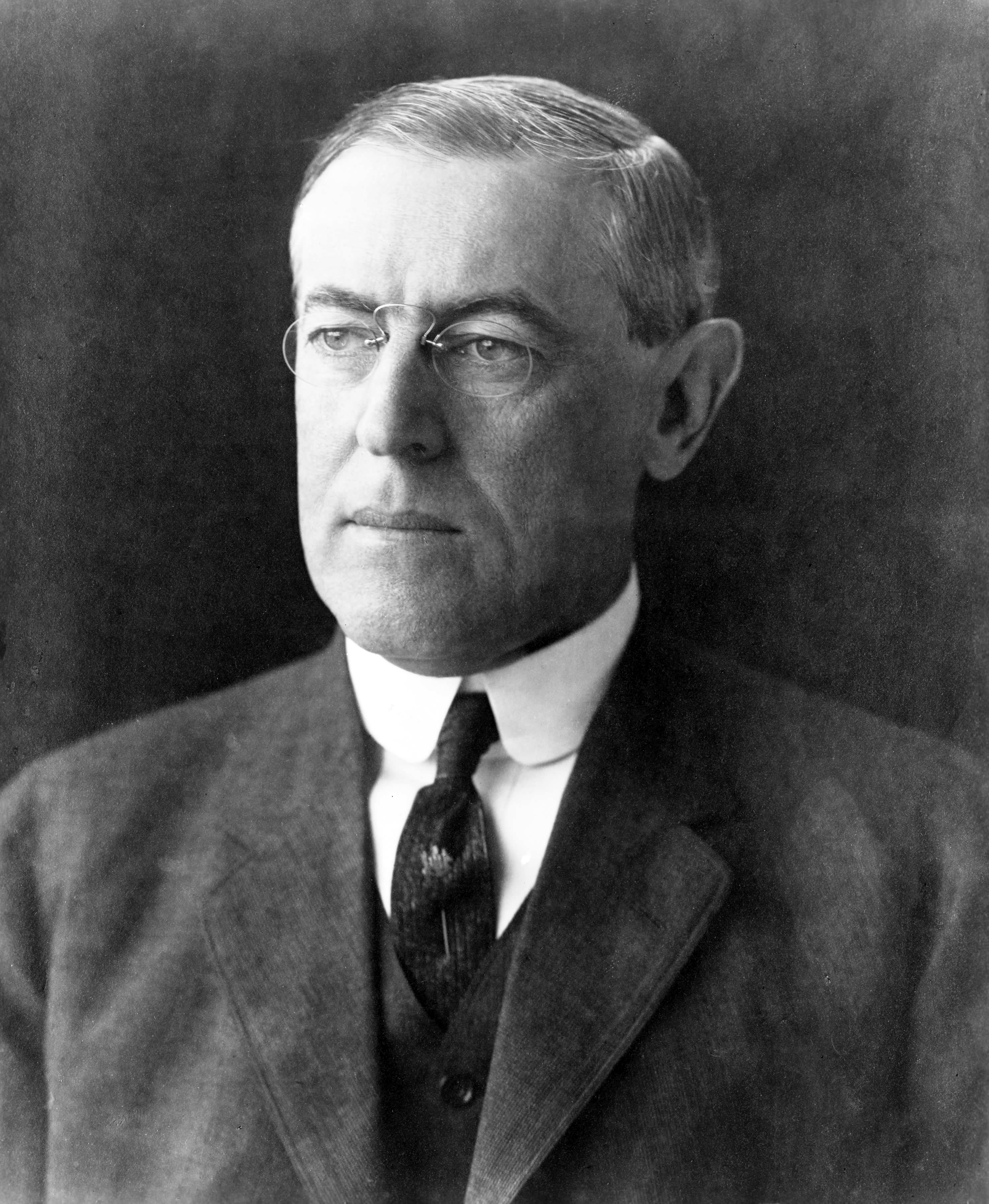

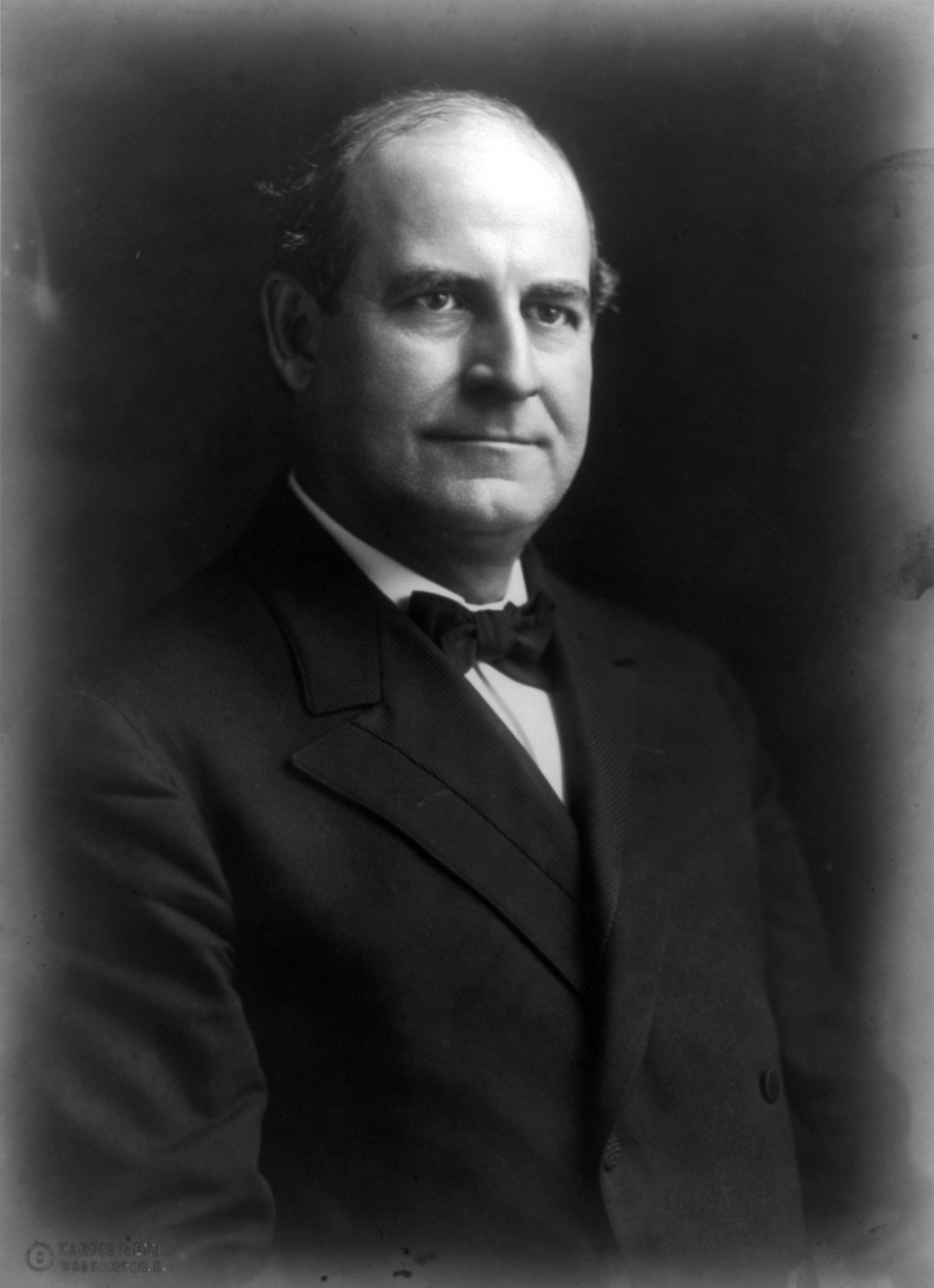

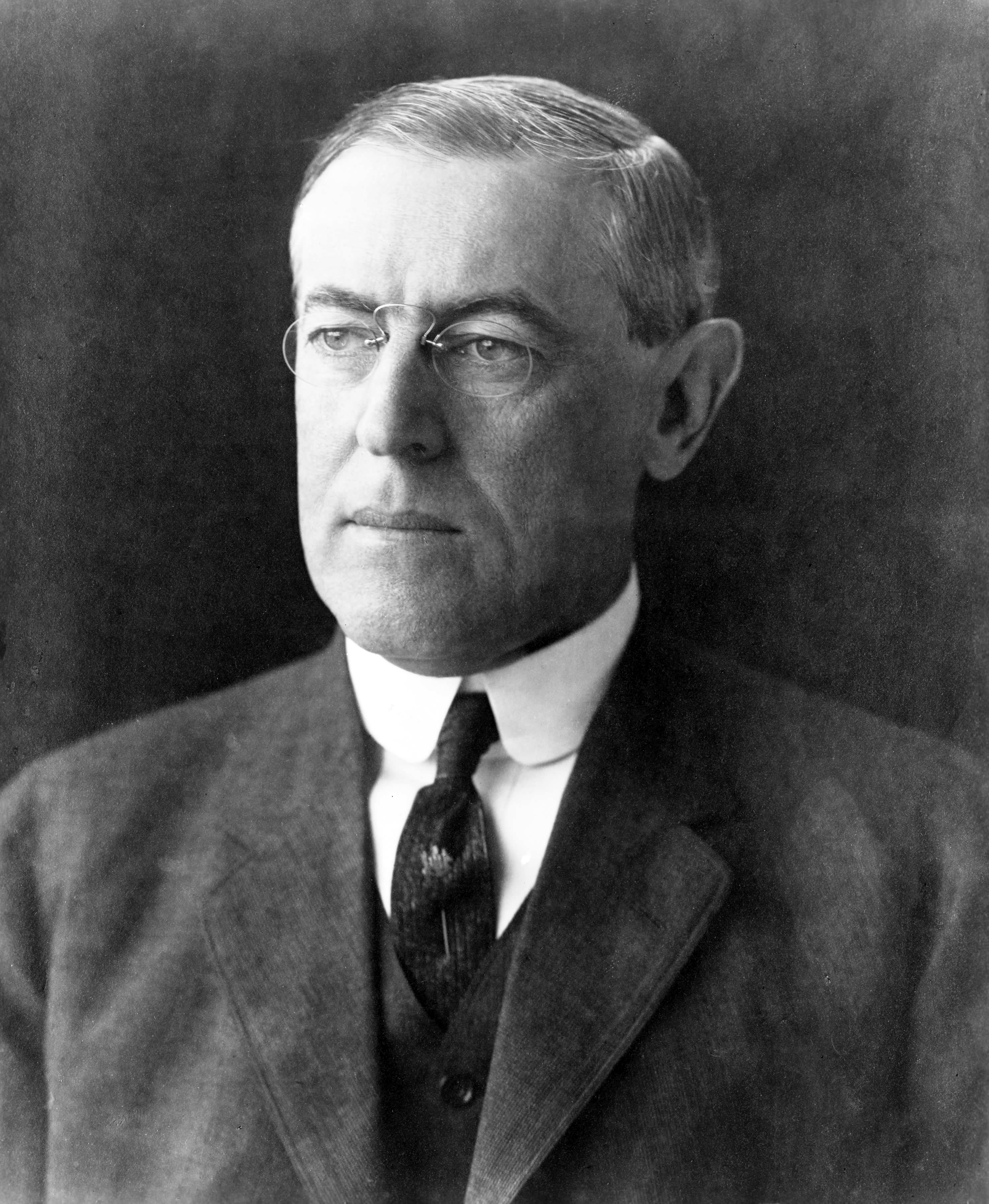

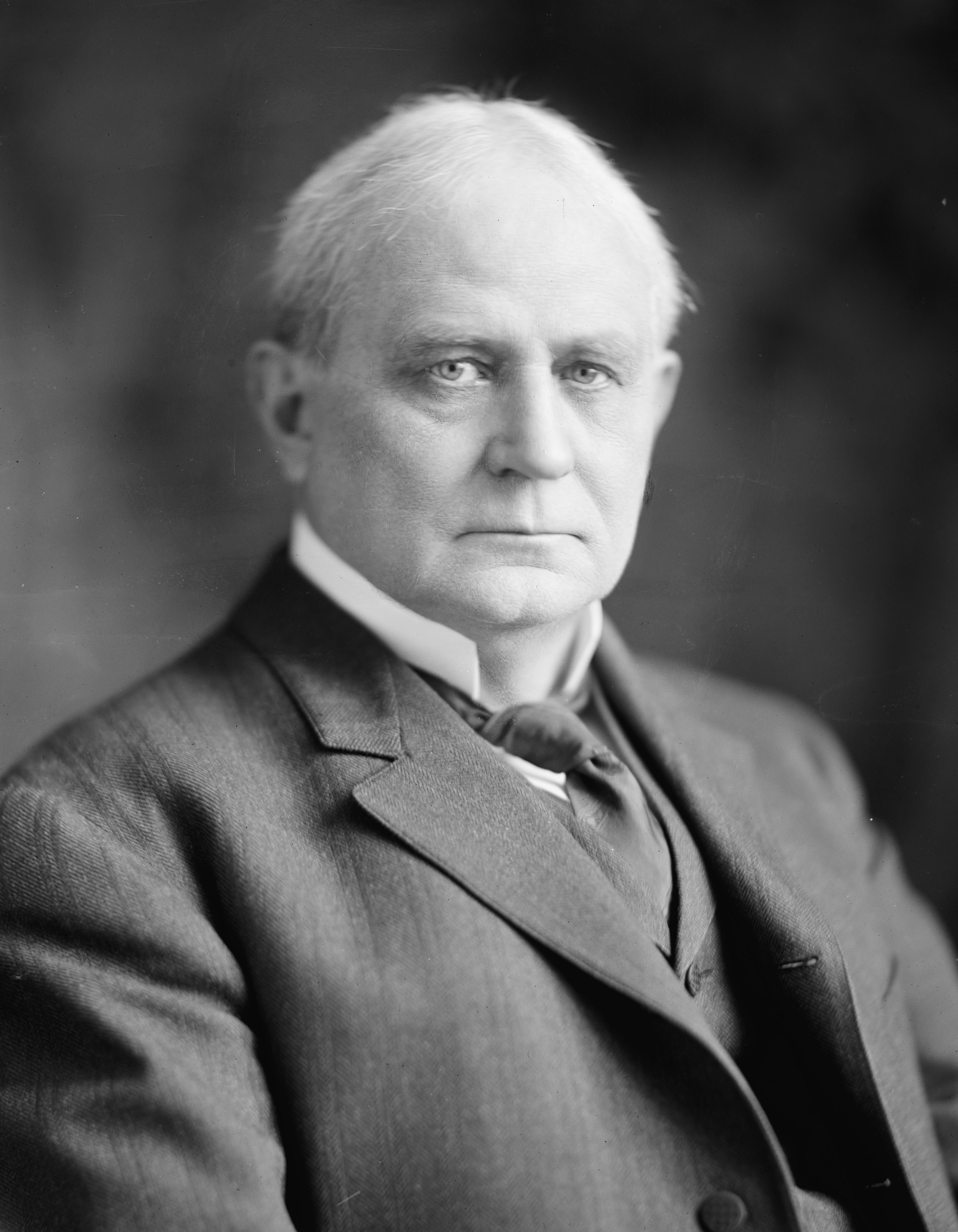

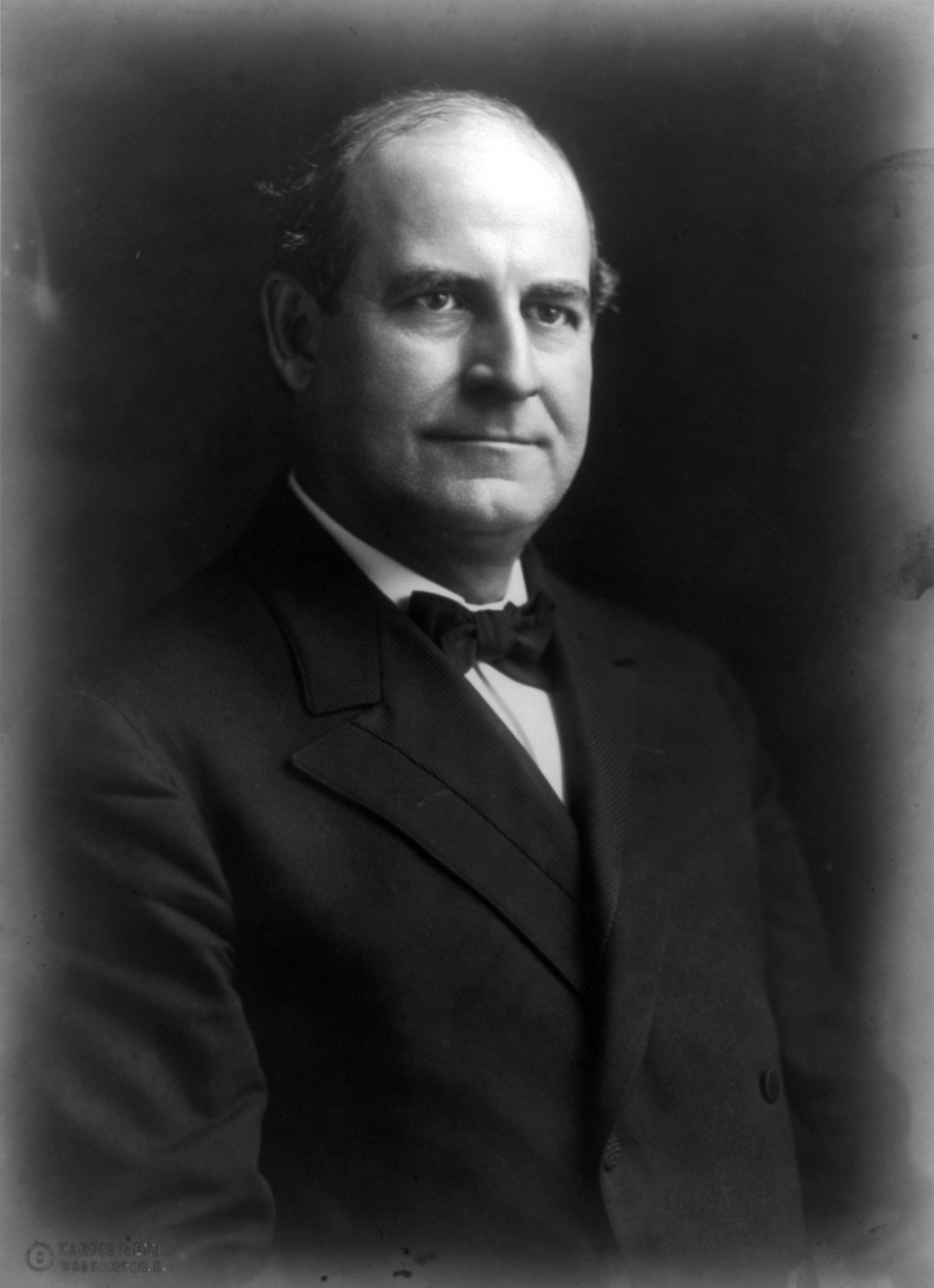

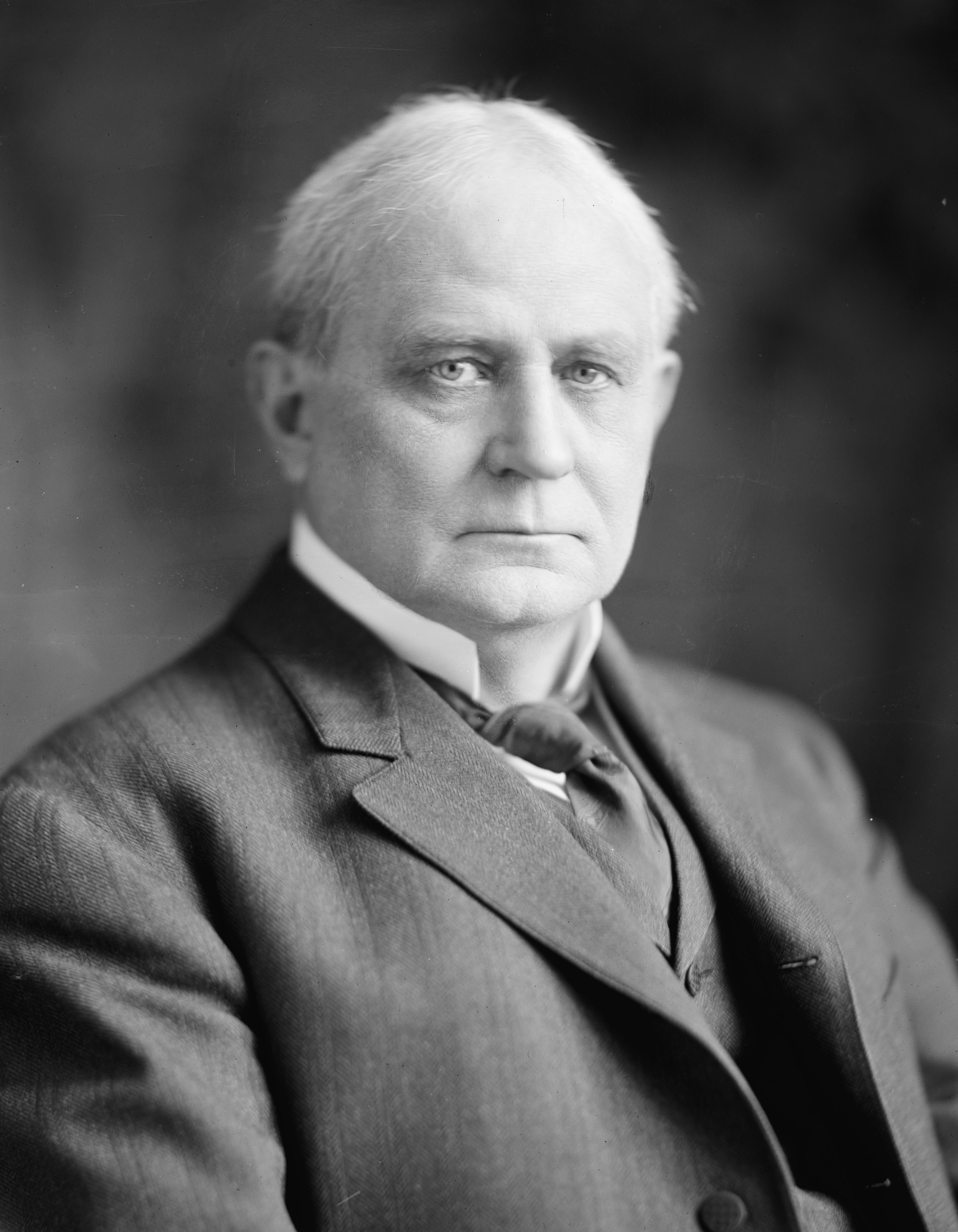
Candidate	Wilson-Bryan Progressive Democracy	Wilson-Clark-Bryan Democracy
Home state	New Jersey (Wilson); Nebraska (Bryan)	New Jersey (Wilson); Missouri (Clark); Nebraska (Bryan)
Delegate count	10 (per State Canvassing Board)	10 (per Secretary of State)
Popular vote	4,694	4,275
Percentage	35.17%	32.03%
Candidate	Clark for President	Homer B. Brown
Home state	Missouri	South Dakota
Delegate count	0	0
Popular vote	2,722	1,655
Percentage	20.40%	12.40%
- Wilson-Bryan 30–40% 40–50% 50–60% 60–70% 70–80% Clark-Bryan <30% 30–40% 40–50% 50–60% 60–70% 70–80% 80–90% >90% Clark 30–40% 40–50% Brown 30–40% No vote/data Tie

A primary for the Democratic presidential candidate was held in South Dakota on June 4, 1912. The race was between four competing slates of national delegates. The first slate to announce its candidacy was aligned with the faction of the local Democratic Party supporting Edwin S. Johnson's campaign for the Democratic nomination for governor. This group ran under the motto "Wilson-Bryan Progressive Democracy" and pledged to support Woodrow Wilson as its first choice for the presidential nomination, with William Jennings Bryan as a second choice should he become a viable candidate. If neither Wilson nor Bryan were available, the delegates were bound by their motto to support a progressive candidate.

In March, the South Dakota Democratic State Central Committee announced its support for the candidacy of P. F. Wickhem in opposition to Johnson and that they would name a ticket with the motto "Wilson-Clark-Bryan Democracy" to oppose Johnson faction candidates at all levels. On 10 April, the Wickem faction filed its list of delegates to the national convention under the title "Wilson-Clark-Bryan Democracy". These delegates were favourable to either Wilson or Champ Clark, with Bryan as a third choice if viable.

Former Senator Richard F. Pettigrew, who had recently assisted Clark's campaigns in Illinois, Iowa, Nebraska, and other states, returned to South Dakota to find the Democratic electorate divided between two tickets that both placed Wilson first in their mottos. Seeking to create a slate that would give Clark first preference, Pettigrew entered negotiations with the Wickhem faction, which he considered receptive after Wickhem's campaign was weakened by the publication of a telegram he had sent to Senator Alfred B. Kittredge opposing the Hepburn Act.

On 7 May, the Wilson-Clark-Bryan Democracy switched its support from Wilson to just Clark. Lee, head of the slate, stated that:

This move on the part of our delegates on the Wilson-Clark-Bryan progressive democracy ticket is made only after due consideration and careful deliberation. There seemed to be considerable opposition for a preference vote on the part of the Johnson democratic members of the state committee, they, as I am convinced, being pledged body and soul to Wilson, and so the committee decided to take no action. But we democrats who believe in fair play, and not being pledged to any presidential candidate especially, decided that in due fairness to all concerned that the democratic voters of South Dakota should have a chance to express a preference. Senator Pettigrew was present at the meeting, and made it plain to myself, as well as the majority of those on hand, that Clark was more preferable than Wilson. For some time prior thereto I had believed that Wilson would be the more acceptable, but the more I learn of him the more I am convinced that he should not receive the nomination. His attitude towards progressive principles, the more one digs into the situation, is not at all creditable, to say the least. I feel now that he is an uncertain quantity, and in line with that belief will support Speaker Clark until after the primaries.

Later, a slate of electors under the motto "Clark for President" and one for a man named Homber B. Brown entered the race. The Wilson-Clark-Bryan Democracy accused the Clark for President slate of being an attempt to split the Clark vote and sought its removal from the ballot. The Secretary of State of South Dakota refused to withdraw the third ticket, but as both tickets were publicly known to support Clark, stated that the votes of both should be acredited to Clark.

As the combined vote of the pro-Clark slates exceeded that of the pro-Wilson slate, the Wilson-Clark-Bryan Democracy delegates were issued certificates under the law by the Democratic State Chairman. Later, the State Canvassing Board issued certificates to the Wilson-Bryan Progressive Democracy delegates.

The Democratic National Committee determined that the pro-Wilson delegates should be seated. This decision was overturned by the Convention's Credentials Committee, which voted 28-23 to seat the Clark delegates instead. F. H. Martin of Wisconsin, who voted against the reversal, took the matter to the floor of the convention. The convention voted 639.5-437 to adopt the minority report of the Credentials Committee, which seated the Wilson delegates.

1912 South Dakota Democratic presidential primary
Candidate	Votes	%
Wilson-Bryan Progressive Democracy	4,694	35.17
Wilson-Clark-Bryan Democracy	4,275	32.03
Champ Clark	2,722	20.40
Homer B. Brown	1,655	12.40
Total votes	69,010	100

=== Republican Party ===
1912 South Dakota Republican presidential primary
- June 4, 1912
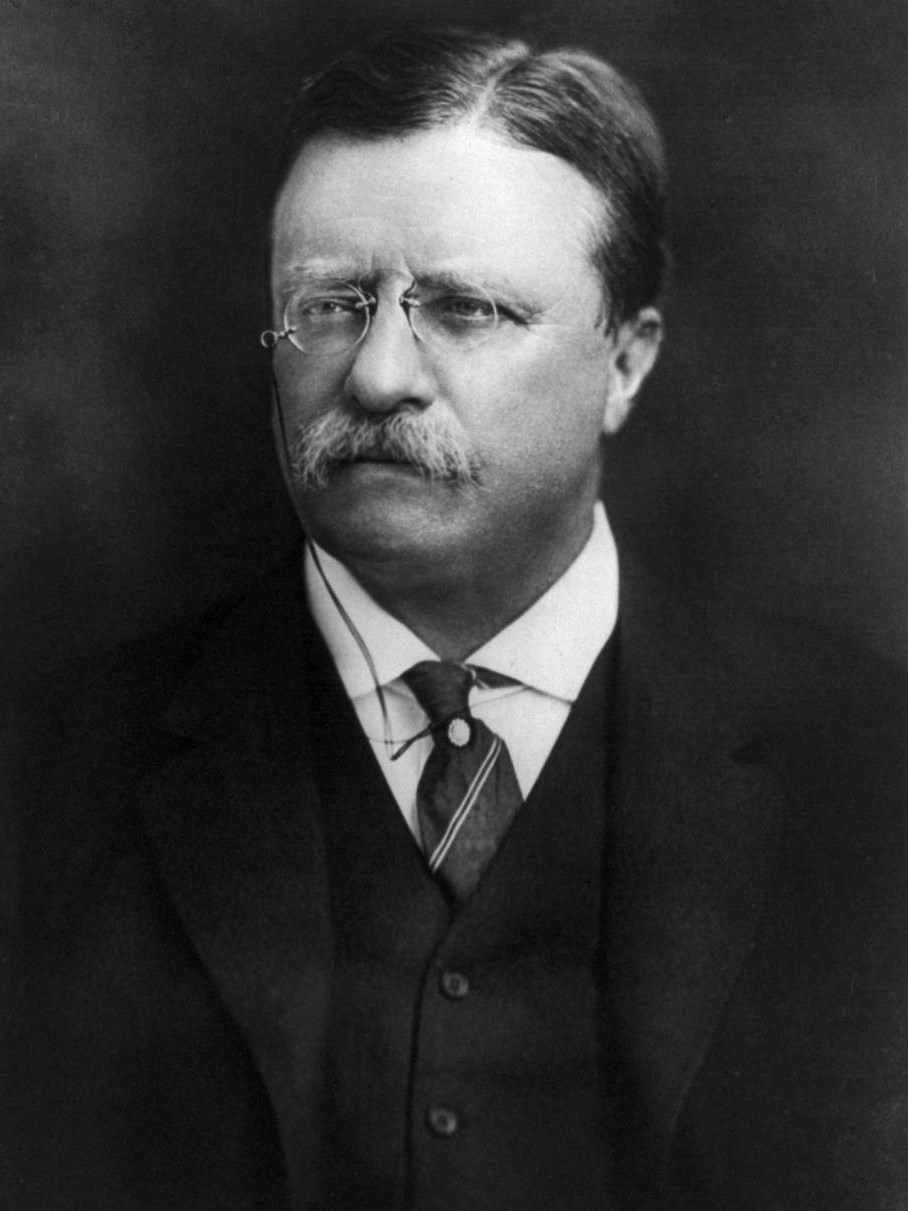

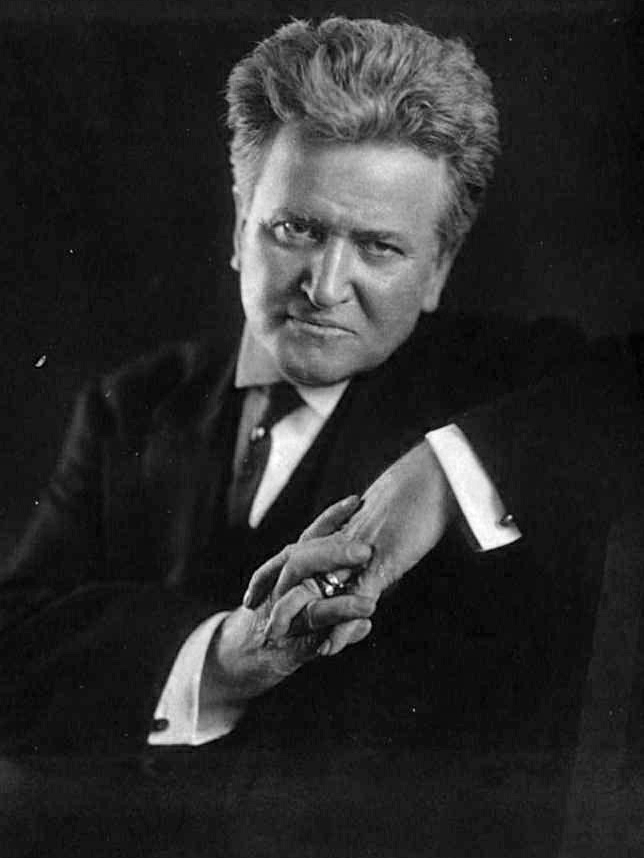

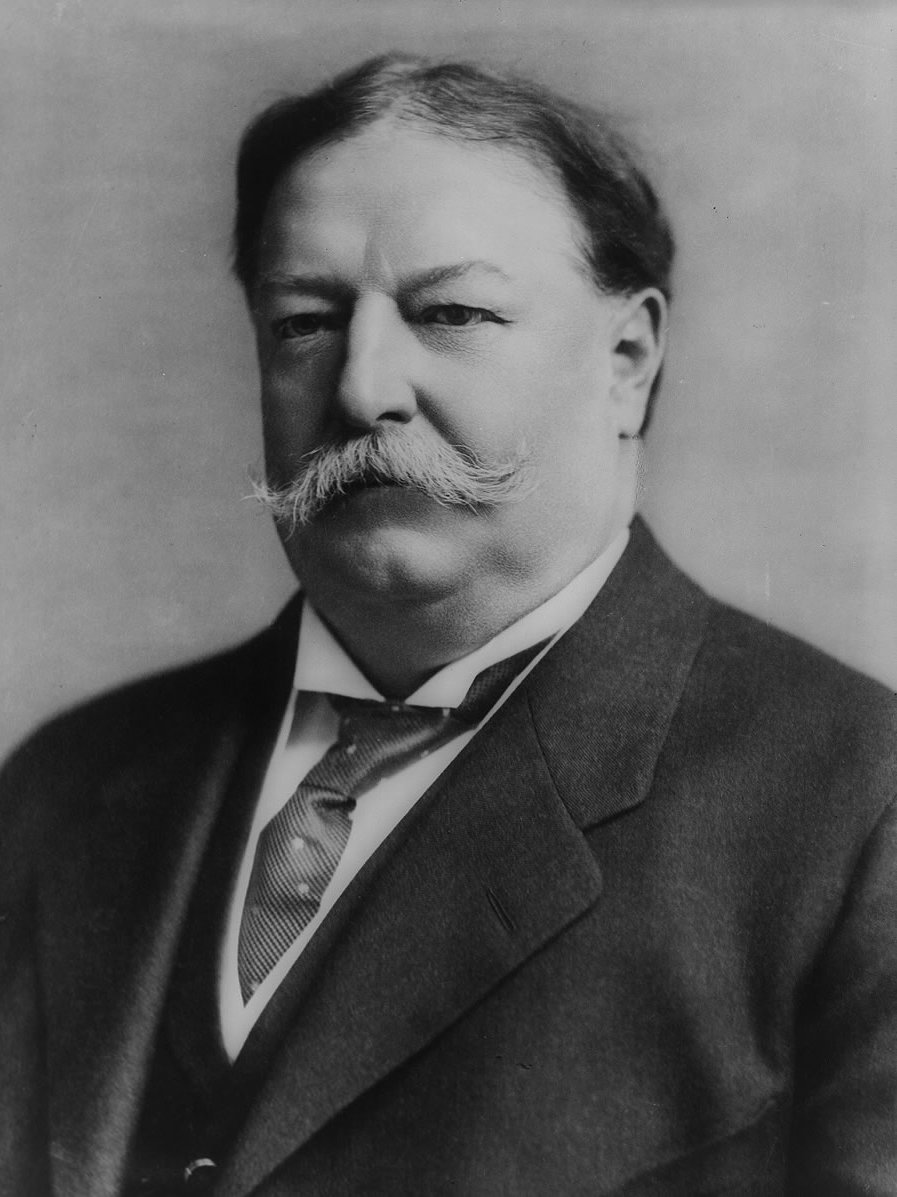
Candidate	Theodore Roosevelt	Robert La Follette	William Howard Taft
Home state	New York	Wisconsin	Ohio
Delegate count	10	0	0
Popular vote	38,106	19,960	10,944
Percentage	55.22%	28.92%	15.86%
- County Results Roosevelt: 40-50% 50-60% 60-70% 70-80% La Follette: 40-50% 50-60% Taft: 40-50% 50-60%

A primary for the Republican presidential candidate was held in South Dakota on June 4, 1912. Theodore Roosevelt won all 10 delegates against Robert M. La Follette and William Howard Taft.

1912 South Dakota Republican presidential primary
Candidate	Votes	%
Theodore Roosevelt	38,106	55.22
Robert M. La Follette	19,960	28.92
William H. Taft (incumbent)	10,944	15.86
Total votes	69,010	100

== Results ==
1912 United States presidential election in South Dakota
Party	Candidate	Votes	%
Republican	Theodore Roosevelt	58,811	50.56%
Democratic	Woodrow Wilson	48,942	42.07%
Socialist	Eugene V. Debs	4,662	4.01%
Prohibition	Eugene Chafin	3,910	3.36%
Total votes		116,325	100%

=== Results by county ===
County	Theodore Roosevelt Republican		Woodrow Wilson Democratic		Eugene V. Debs Socialist		Eugene W. Chafin Prohibition		Margin		Total votes cast
County	#	%	#	%	#	%	#	%	#	%	Total votes cast
Aurora	652	41.69%	801	51.21%	43	2.75%	68	4.35%	-149	-9.53%	1,564
Beadle	1,493	46.76%	1,464	45.85%	166	5.20%	70	2.19%	29	0.91%	3,193
Bennett	68	26.88%	179	70.75%	3	1.19%	3	1.19%	-111	-43.87%	253
Bon Homme	1,228	51.77%	1,059	44.65%	45	1.90%	40	1.69%	169	7.12%	2,372
Brookings	1,389	58.00%	740	30.90%	58	2.42%	208	8.68%	649	27.10%	2,395
Brown	1,746	35.57%	2,488	50.69%	385	7.84%	289	5.89%	-742	-15.12%	4,908
Brule	643	40.96%	842	53.63%	67	4.27%	18	1.15%	-199	-12.68%	1,570
Buffalo	83	42.56%	105	53.85%	4	2.05%	3	1.54%	-22	-11.28%	195
Butte	649	44.36%	601	41.08%	189	12.92%	24	1.64%	48	3.28%	1,463
Campbell	574	74.93%	150	19.58%	10	1.31%	32	4.18%	424	55.35%	766
Charles Mix	1,817	51.26%	1,625	45.84%	59	1.66%	44	1.24%	192	5.42%	3,545
Clark	949	54.67%	668	38.48%	36	2.07%	83	4.78%	281	16.19%	1,736
Clay	1,262	55.69%	929	41.00%	27	1.19%	48	2.12%	333	14.70%	2,266
Codington	1,195	48.44%	1,111	45.03%	71	2.88%	90	3.65%	84	3.40%	2,467
Corson	508	49.42%	455	44.26%	49	4.77%	16	1.56%	53	5.16%	1,028
Custer	395	43.26%	419	45.89%	91	9.97%	8	0.88%	-24	-2.63%	913
Davison	1,364	48.78%	1,266	45.28%	68	2.43%	98	3.51%	98	3.51%	2,796
Day	1,209	51.87%	787	33.76%	111	4.76%	224	9.61%	422	18.10%	2,331
Deuel	887	62.69%	441	31.17%	15	1.06%	72	5.09%	446	31.52%	1,415
Dewey	509	52.26%	411	42.20%	42	4.31%	12	1.23%	98	10.06%	974
Douglas	765	50.80%	714	47.41%	11	0.73%	16	1.06%	51	3.39%	1,506
Edmunds	640	43.13%	729	49.12%	26	1.75%	89	6.00%	-89	-6.00%	1,484
Fall River	846	50.09%	712	42.16%	100	5.92%	31	1.84%	134	7.93%	1,689
Faulk	568	43.76%	615	47.38%	23	1.77%	92	7.09%	-47	-3.62%	1,298
Grant	828	52.34%	619	39.13%	55	3.48%	80	5.06%	209	13.21%	1,582
Gregory	1,348	50.96%	1,176	44.46%	96	3.63%	25	0.95%	172	6.50%	2,645
Hamlin	1,058	66.79%	474	29.92%	17	1.07%	35	2.21%	584	36.87%	1,584
Hand	738	43.54%	826	48.73%	44	2.60%	87	5.13%	-88	-5.19%	1,695
Hanson	708	50.46%	632	45.05%	21	1.50%	42	2.99%	76	5.42%	1,403
Harding	600	54.45%	325	29.49%	113	10.25%	64	5.81%	275	24.95%	1,102
Hughes	447	41.50%	544	50.51%	63	5.85%	23	2.14%	-97	-9.01%	1,077
Hutchinson	1,451	67.84%	647	30.25%	12	0.56%	29	1.36%	804	37.59%	2,139
Hyde	398	56.86%	232	33.14%	53	7.57%	17	2.43%	166	23.71%	700
Jerauld	545	47.52%	436	38.01%	11	0.96%	155	13.51%	109	9.50%	1,147
Kingsbury	1,152	53.23%	747	34.52%	113	5.22%	152	7.02%	405	18.72%	2,164
Lake	1,174	59.87%	657	33.50%	79	4.03%	51	2.60%	517	26.36%	1,961
Lawrence	1,692	37.84%	2,412	53.95%	326	7.29%	41	0.92%	-720	-16.10%	4,471
Lincoln	1,674	66.40%	719	28.52%	56	2.22%	72	2.86%	955	37.88%	2,521
Lyman	990	51.43%	766	39.79%	135	7.01%	34	1.77%	224	11.64%	1,925
Marshall	601	47.85%	541	43.07%	45	3.58%	69	5.49%	60	4.78%	1,256
McCook	1,063	49.33%	962	44.64%	56	2.60%	74	3.43%	101	4.69%	2,155
McPherson	649	65.23%	327	32.86%	6	0.60%	13	1.31%	322	32.36%	995
Meade	1,032	46.28%	975	43.72%	152	6.82%	71	3.18%	57	2.56%	2,230
Mellette	261	44.01%	320	53.96%	5	0.84%	7	1.18%	-59	-9.95%	593
Miner	851	51.33%	720	43.43%	39	2.35%	48	2.90%	131	7.90%	1,658
Minnehaha	3,051	50.20%	2,576	42.38%	256	4.21%	195	3.21%	475	7.82%	6,078
Moody	932	52.10%	637	35.61%	119	6.65%	101	5.65%	295	16.49%	1,789
Pennington	1,073	45.52%	1,135	48.15%	117	4.96%	32	1.36%	-62	-2.63%	2,357
Perkins	1,052	50.07%	832	39.60%	177	8.42%	40	1.90%	220	10.47%	2,101
Potter	439	48.72%	423	46.95%	17	1.89%	22	2.44%	16	1.78%	901
Roberts	1,361	55.35%	812	33.02%	201	8.17%	85	3.46%	549	22.33%	2,459
Sanborn	880	56.63%	577	37.13%	19	1.22%	78	5.02%	303	19.50%	1,554
Spink	1,432	47.34%	1,347	44.53%	128	4.23%	118	3.90%	85	2.81%	3,025
Stanley	981	44.29%	1,051	47.45%	137	6.19%	46	2.08%	-70	-3.16%	2,215
Sully	292	51.05%	242	42.31%	19	3.32%	19	3.32%	50	8.74%	572
Tripp	1,153	51.27%	982	43.66%	82	3.65%	32	1.42%	171	7.60%	2,249
Turner	1,603	61.35%	906	34.67%	22	0.84%	82	3.14%	697	26.67%	2,613
Union	1,396	56.54%	965	39.08%	22	0.89%	86	3.48%	431	17.46%	2,469
Walworth	585	52.19%	451	40.23%	55	4.91%	30	2.68%	134	11.95%	1,121
Yankton	1,511	51.61%	1,289	44.02%	61	2.08%	67	2.29%	222	7.58%	2,928
Ziebach	371	48.43%	349	45.56%	36	4.70%	10	1.31%	22	2.87%	766
Totals	58,811	50.56%	48,942	42.07%	4,662	4.01%	3,910	3.36%	9,869	8.48%	116,325

== See also ==
- United States presidential elections in South Dakota
