= Pollock station =

Pollock
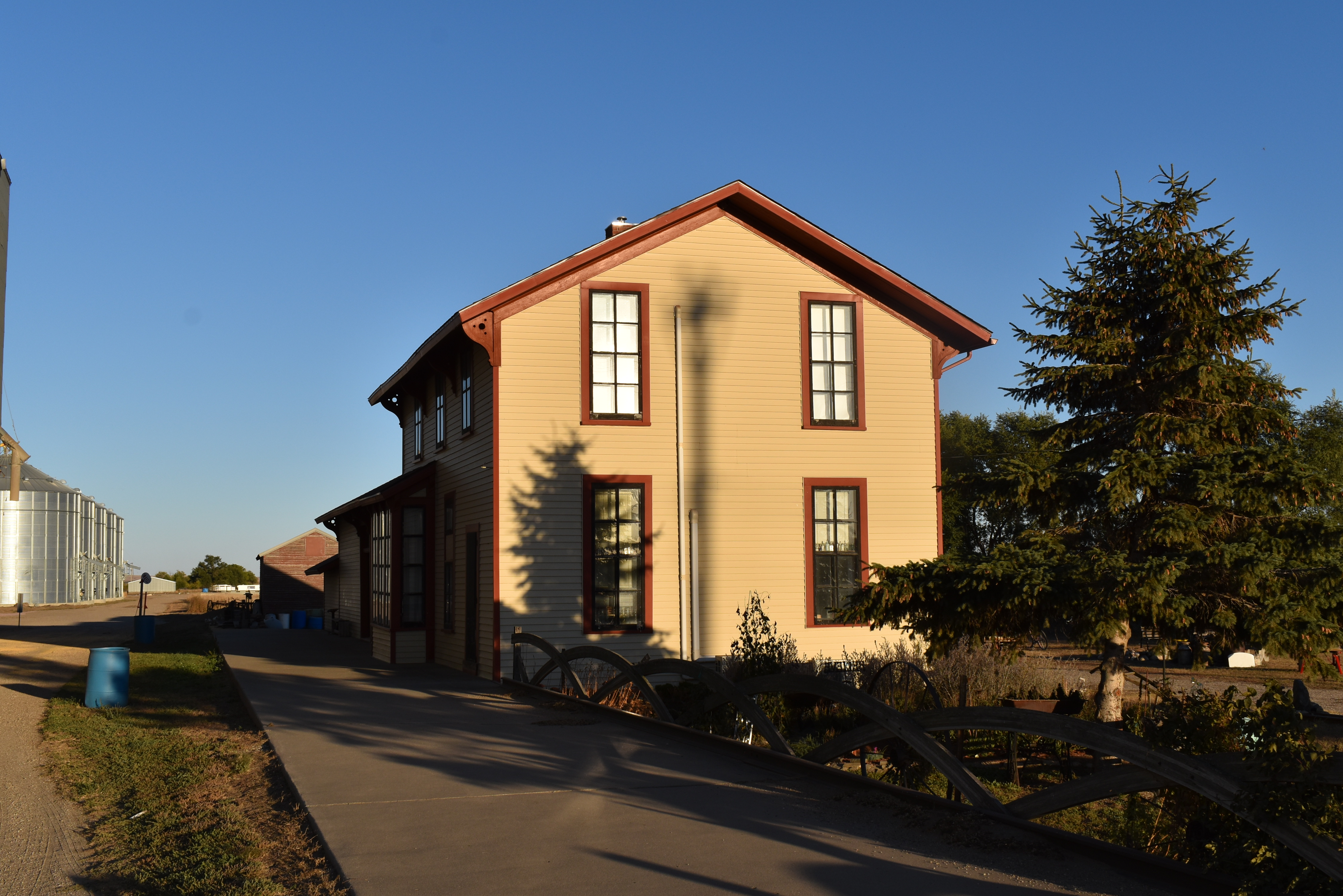
- Pollock depot (2022)

General information
- Location: Ave. A, SW of SD 10, Pollock, South Dakota
- System: Former Soo Line passenger rail station

History
- Opened: 1901

Services
Preceding station	Soo Line	Following station
Terminus	Pollock – Wishek	Herreid toward Wishek
- Pollock Depot
- U.S. National Register of Historic Places
- Location within South Dakota Location within the United States
- Location: Ave. A, SW of SD 10, Pollock, South Dakota
- Coordinates: 45°53′52″N 100°17′6″W
- Area: less than one acre
- Built: 1901
- NRHP reference No.: 96001229
- Added to NRHP: November 8, 1996
Location

The Pollock Depot is a historic former railroad station on Avenue A in Pollock, South Dakota. It is a wood-frame structure with a gable roof, with two sections, one two stories, and the other a single story. The station was built in 1901 to Plan 3104, one of five plans used by the Minneapolis, St. Paul and Sault Ste. Marie Railroad (a.k.a. the "Soo Line") for its stations. The establishment of the station at this location resulted in the founding of the town of Pollock, whose buildings were moved here from other area communities. The single-story section, divided into seven sections by large brackets, originally housed freight, while the two-story section provided passenger facilities on the first floor with living quarters for railroad workers above.

In 1995 the building was converted into a hunting lodge. It was listed on the National Register of Historic Places in 1996.
