= Campbell County, South Dakota =

County in South Dakota, United States

- County
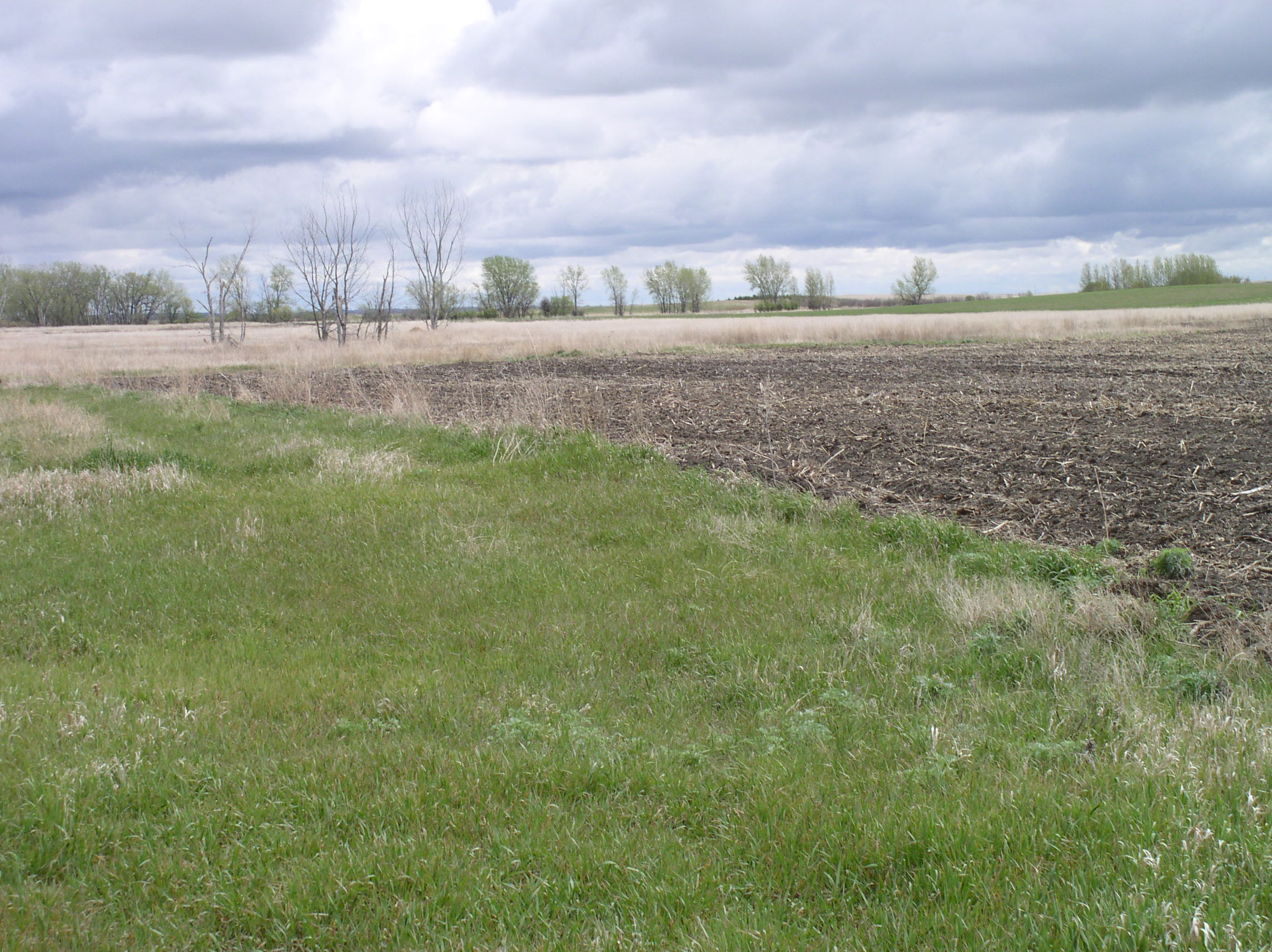

- Location within the U.S. state of South Dakota
- Coordinates: 45°47′8.07″N 100°00′7.585″W
- Country: United States
- State: South Dakota
- Created: 1873
- Organized: 1884
- Seat: Mound City
- Largest city: Herreid

Area
  - Total: 771 sq mi (2,000 km^{2})
  - Land: 734 sq mi (1,900 km^{2})
  - Water: 37 sq mi (96 km^{2}) 4.8%

Population (2020)
  - Total: 1,377
  - Estimate (2025): 1,377
  - Density: 1.88/sq mi (0.724/km^{2})
- Time zone: UTC−6 (Central)
  - Summer (DST): UTC−5 (CDT)
- Congressional district: At-large

Campbell County is a county in the U.S. state of South Dakota. As of the 2020 census, the population was 1,377, making it the fourth-least populous county in South Dakota. Its county seat is Mound City. The county was created in 1873 and organized in 1884. It was named for Norman B. Campbell, a Dakota Territory legislator in 1873 and son of General Charles T. Campbell.

== History ==
Campbell County was formed in 1873 and organized in 1884. La Grace served as the first county seat; in 1888 the seat was transferred to Mound City. By 1911 the communities of Artas, Herreid and Pollock had the largest populations because they were located on a branch of the Soo Line.

== Geography ==
Campbell County lies on the north side of South Dakota; its north boundary line abuts the south boundary line of the state of North Dakota. The Missouri River flows southward along the county's west boundary line. The county terrain consists of semi-arid low rolling hills, a portion of which is dedicated to agriculture. The terrain slopes to the south and east, with its highest point occurring on the county's north boundary line, toward the NE corner: 2,060 ft (630 m). The county has a total area of 771 square miles (2,000 km^{2}), of which 734 square miles (1,900 km^{2}) is land and 37 square miles (96 km^{2}) (4.8%) is water.

The eastern portion of South Dakota's counties (48 of 66) observe Central Time; the western counties (18 of 66) observe Mountain Time. Campbell County is the westernmost of the SD counties to observe Central Time.

=== Major highways ===
- U.S. Highway 83
- South Dakota Highway 10
- South Dakota Highway 271
- South Dakota Highway 1804

=== Adjacent counties ===
- Emmons County, North Dakota – north
- McIntosh County, North Dakota – northeast
- McPherson County – east
- Walworth County – south
- Corson County – west (boundary of Mountain Time)

=== Protected areas ===
- Pocasse National Wildlife Refuge
- Rogo Bay State Game Production Area
- Salt Lake State Game Production Area
- Sand Lake State Game Production Area
- Shaw Creek State Lakeside Use Area
- West Pollock State Recreation Area

=== Lakes ===
- McClarem Lake
- Lake Oahe (part)
- Lake Pocasse
- Salt Lake
- Sand Lake

== Demographics ==
Historical population
| Census | Pop. | Note | %± |
|---|---|---|---|
| 1880 | 50 | | — |
| 1890 | 3,510 | | 6,920.0% |
| 1900 | 4,527 | | 29.0% |
| 1910 | 5,244 | | 15.8% |
| 1920 | 5,305 | | 1.2% |
| 1930 | 5,629 | | 6.1% |
| 1940 | 5,033 | | −10.6% |
| 1950 | 4,046 | | −19.6% |
| 1960 | 3,531 | | −12.7% |
| 1970 | 2,866 | | −18.8% |
| 1980 | 2,243 | | −21.7% |
| 1990 | 1,965 | | −12.4% |
| 2000 | 1,782 | | −9.3% |
| 2010 | 1,466 | | −17.7% |
| 2020 | 1,377 | | −6.1% |
| 2025 (est.) | 1,377 | Steady | 0.0% |
U.S. Decennial Census; 1790–1960 1900–1990; 1990–2000 2010–2020

=== 2020 census ===
As of the 2020 census, there were 1,377 people, 640 households, and 397 families residing in the county. Of the residents, 20.0% were under the age of 18 and 27.7% were 65 years of age or older; the median age was 53.5 years. For every 100 females there were 108.0 males, and for every 100 females age 18 and over there were 105.6 males. The population density was 1.9 inhabitants per square mile (0.73/km^{2}).

The racial makeup of the county was 93.1% White, 0.0% Black or African American, 2.3% American Indian and Alaska Native, 0.4% Asian, 0.5% from some other race, and 3.7% from two or more races. Hispanic or Latino residents of any race comprised 2.7% of the population.

Of the 640 households, 22.5% had children under the age of 18 living with them and 18.3% had a female householder with no spouse or partner present. About 33.8% of all households were made up of individuals and 21.0% had someone living alone who was 65 years of age or older.

There were 900 housing units, of which 28.9% were vacant. Among occupied housing units, 81.3% were owner-occupied and 18.8% were renter-occupied. The homeowner vacancy rate was 1.9% and the rental vacancy rate was 5.5%.

=== 2010 census ===
As of the 2010 census, there were 1,466 people, 694 households, and 423 families in the county. The population density was 2.0 inhabitants per square mile (0.77/km^{2}). There were 980 housing units at an average density of 1.3 units per square mile (0.50 units/km^{2}). The racial makeup of the county was 98.3% white, 0.3% Asian, 0.3% American Indian, 0.1% black or African American, 0.2% from other races, and 0.8% from two or more races. Those of Hispanic or Latino origin made up 1.4% of the population. In terms of ancestry, 68.5% were German, 14.1% were Norwegian, 12.6% were Dutch, 11.4% were Russian, 7.8% were Irish, and 2.7% were American.

Of the 694 households, 21.6% had children under the age of 18 living with them, 55.6% were married couples living together, 3.0% had a female householder with no husband present, 39.0% were non-families, and 35.6% of all households were made up of individuals. The average household size was 2.11 and the average family size was 2.70. The median age was 50.1 years.

The median income for a household in the county was $42,833 and the median income for a family was $48,864. Males had a median income of $41,563 versus $30,705 for females. The per capita income for the county was $22,338. About 6.1% of families and 10.7% of the population were below the poverty line, including 20.8% of those under age 18 and 13.0% of those age 65 or over.

=== Religion ===
In the 2010 census, the largest denomination was the Evangelical Lutheran Church in America with 286 adherents, followed by the Catholic church with 191 members, the third was the Presbyterian Church in America with 186 followers. The Reformed Church in the United States, the Wisconsin Evangelical Lutheran Synod, and the North American Baptist Conference were also represented with lesser numbers. Campbell County has the highest percentage of Presbyterians in the United States.

== Communities ==
There are no organized civil townships in Campbell County. Artas Township and Mound City Township are named, while Herreid Township, Pollock Township, Sand Lake Township and Stout's Lake Township are implied, in a 1911 map book.

=== City ===
- Herreid

=== Towns ===
- Artas
- Mound City (county seat)
- Pollock

=== Unincorporated communities ===
- Gale (Coordinates: 45.79720, -100.26530)
- La Grace (ghost town, former county seat; Coordinates: 45.88000, -100.37190)
- North Campbell
- South Campbell
- Tilso
- Vanderbilt (ghost town) (Located in T 128 N, R 80 W, about 6 miles west-northwest of Pollock) – The Vanderbilt Archeological Site is in the vicinity.

== Politics ==
With its rural German-American heritage, Campbell is an overwhelmingly Republican county. It has only once been carried by a Democratic presidential candidate, during Franklin D. Roosevelt’s landslide victory of 1932. Nonetheless, in the following election when FDR gained an even more emphatic victory by carrying forty-six of forty-eight states, his Republican opponent Alf Landon carried Campbell County by twenty-five percentage points, making the county Landon's second-strongest in the Plains States (behind Brown County in his home state). Since 1940, no Democrat has so much as equaled Roosevelt's 1936 share of the vote, and even before 1932, only William Jennings Bryan in 1896 gained over forty percent of the vote for the Democratic Party. In 1952, Campbell was Dwight D. Eisenhower's third-strongest county in the nation, and in 1964 it rivalled Hooker County in Nebraska and that famous GOP bastion Jackson County in Kentucky as Barry Goldwater’s strongest county outside the South.

United States presidential election results for Campbell County, South Dakota
| Year | Republican | | Democratic | | Third party(ies) | |
| Year | No. | % | No. | % | No. | % |
|---|---|---|---|---|---|---|
| 1892 | 390 | 58.12% | 77 | 11.48% | 204 | 30.40% |
| 1896 | 449 | 54.62% | 369 | 44.89% | 4 | 0.49% |
| 1900 | 626 | 70.42% | 250 | 28.12% | 13 | 1.46% |
| 1904 | 685 | 83.03% | 120 | 14.55% | 20 | 2.42% |
| 1908 | 627 | 75.18% | 175 | 20.98% | 32 | 3.84% |
| 1912 | 0 | 0.00% | 150 | 19.58% | 616 | 80.42% |
| 1916 | 644 | 77.40% | 163 | 19.59% | 25 | 3.00% |
| 1920 | 1,128 | 71.26% | 67 | 4.23% | 388 | 24.51% |
| 1924 | 641 | 54.55% | 46 | 3.91% | 488 | 41.53% |
| 1928 | 1,346 | 69.13% | 588 | 30.20% | 13 | 0.67% |
| 1932 | 770 | 40.44% | 1,116 | 58.61% | 18 | 0.95% |
| 1936 | 1,236 | 60.98% | 736 | 36.31% | 55 | 2.71% |
| 1940 | 1,733 | 80.64% | 416 | 19.36% | 0 | 0.00% |
| 1944 | 1,047 | 83.43% | 208 | 16.57% | 0 | 0.00% |
| 1948 | 1,518 | 78.05% | 410 | 21.08% | 17 | 0.87% |
| 1952 | 1,536 | 90.14% | 168 | 9.86% | 0 | 0.00% |
| 1956 | 1,268 | 81.44% | 289 | 18.56% | 0 | 0.00% |
| 1960 | 1,330 | 78.61% | 362 | 21.39% | 0 | 0.00% |
| 1964 | 1,162 | 73.87% | 411 | 26.13% | 0 | 0.00% |
| 1968 | 1,216 | 79.27% | 245 | 15.97% | 73 | 4.76% |
| 1972 | 1,169 | 76.06% | 361 | 23.49% | 7 | 0.46% |
| 1976 | 897 | 64.49% | 489 | 35.15% | 5 | 0.36% |
| 1980 | 1,271 | 84.85% | 182 | 12.15% | 45 | 3.00% |
| 1984 | 1,035 | 82.47% | 214 | 17.05% | 6 | 0.48% |
| 1988 | 909 | 72.60% | 334 | 26.68% | 9 | 0.72% |
| 1992 | 574 | 54.51% | 222 | 21.08% | 257 | 24.41% |
| 1996 | 623 | 64.23% | 202 | 20.82% | 145 | 14.95% |
| 2000 | 739 | 80.59% | 147 | 16.03% | 31 | 3.38% |
| 2004 | 708 | 73.83% | 239 | 24.92% | 12 | 1.25% |
| 2008 | 591 | 69.20% | 243 | 28.45% | 20 | 2.34% |
| 2012 | 616 | 78.27% | 153 | 19.44% | 18 | 2.29% |
| 2016 | 704 | 84.72% | 105 | 12.64% | 22 | 2.65% |
| 2020 | 747 | 85.57% | 117 | 13.40% | 9 | 1.03% |
| 2024 | 706 | 84.45% | 120 | 14.35% | 10 | 1.20% |

== See also ==
- National Register of Historic Places listings in Campbell County, South Dakota
