= Pollock, South Dakota =

- Town
- Location in Campbell County and the state of South Dakota
- Coordinates: 45°54′02″N 100°17′19″W
- Country: United States
- State: South Dakota
- County: Campbell
- Founded: 1901

Area
  - Total: 0.32 sq mi (0.83 km^{2})
  - Land: 0.32 sq mi (0.83 km^{2})
  - Water: 0 sq mi (0.00 km^{2})
- Elevation: 1,660 ft (510 m)

Population (2020)
  - Total: 224
  - Density: 696.9/sq mi (269.07/km^{2})
- Time zone: UTC-6 (Central (CST))
  - Summer (DST): UTC-5 (CDT)
- ZIP code: 57648
- Area code: 605
- FIPS code: 46-51260
- GNIS feature ID: 1267536
- Website: www.pollocksouthdakota.com

Pollock is a town in Campbell County, South Dakota, United States. The population was 224 at the time of the 2020 census.

== History ==
Pollock was laid out in 1901 in anticipation of the arrival of a branch of the Soo Line, and named in honor of a first settler with the last name Pollock. The Pollock Depot, a wood-frame former railroad station, is listed on the National Register of Historic Places.

As the roads in the county improved, there was more freight and passenger transportation by truck and automobile. Lower demand for rail freight led to the branch line being partially abandoned.

== Geography ==
According to the United States Census Bureau, the town has a total area of 0.32 square miles (0.83 km^{2}), all land.

=== Climate ===
Climate data for Pollock, South Dakota (1991−2020 normals, extremes 1908−present)
Month	Jan	Feb	Mar	Apr	May	Jun	Jul	Aug	Sep	Oct	Nov	Dec	Year
Record high °F (°C)	63 (17)	71 (22)	86 (30)	98 (37)	108 (42)	109 (43)	118 (48)	110 (43)	107 (42)	95 (35)	79 (26)	68 (20)	118 (48)
Mean daily maximum °F (°C)	24.1 (−4.4)	29.0 (−1.7)	41.9 (5.5)	57.8 (14.3)	69.8 (21.0)	79.0 (26.1)	85.4 (29.7)	84.3 (29.1)	75.2 (24.0)	58.3 (14.6)	41.3 (5.2)	28.3 (−2.1)	56.2 (13.4)
Daily mean °F (°C)	13.5 (−10.3)	18.2 (−7.7)	30.6 (−0.8)	44.7 (7.1)	56.9 (13.8)	66.8 (19.3)	72.6 (22.6)	70.9 (21.6)	61.5 (16.4)	46.3 (7.9)	31.0 (−0.6)	18.6 (−7.4)	44.3 (6.8)
Mean daily minimum °F (°C)	3.0 (−16.1)	7.5 (−13.6)	19.3 (−7.1)	31.6 (−0.2)	44.0 (6.7)	54.5 (12.5)	59.7 (15.4)	57.4 (14.1)	47.8 (8.8)	34.4 (1.3)	20.6 (−6.3)	8.9 (−12.8)	32.4 (0.2)
Record low °F (°C)	−50 (−46)	−51 (−46)	−33 (−36)	−6 (−21)	5 (−15)	27 (−3)	30 (−1)	28 (−2)	12 (−11)	−17 (−27)	−27 (−33)	−45 (−43)	−51 (−46)
Average precipitation inches (mm)	0.37 (9.4)	0.46 (12)	0.71 (18)	1.32 (34)	2.77 (70)	3.21 (82)	2.74 (70)	2.18 (55)	1.54 (39)	1.58 (40)	0.49 (12)	0.46 (12)	17.83 (453)
Average snowfall inches (cm)	7.7 (20)	7.3 (19)	5.5 (14)	4.2 (11)	0.2 (0.51)	0.0 (0.0)	0.0 (0.0)	0.0 (0.0)	0.0 (0.0)	1.6 (4.1)	4.8 (12)	7.7 (20)	39.0 (99)
Average precipitation days (≥ 0.01 in)	5.3	5.4	5.4	6.9	9.4	10.8	8.7	7.0	5.8	6.6	4.6	5.4	81.3
Average snowy days (≥ 0.1 in)	4.5	4.6	3.1	1.5	0.0	0.0	0.0	0.0	0.0	0.6	2.3	4.5	21.1
Source: NOAA

== Demographics ==
Historical population
Census	Pop.	Note	%±
1910	304		—
1920	437		43.8%
1930	481		10.1%
1940	527		9.6%
1950	395		−25.0%
1960	417		5.6%
1970	341		−18.2%
1980	355		4.1%
1990	379		6.8%
2000	339		−10.6%
2010	241		−28.9%
2020	224		−7.1%
U.S. Decennial Census; 2012 Estimate

=== 2010 census ===
As of the census of 2010, there were 241 people, 136 households, and 62 families residing in the town. The population density was 753.1 inhabitants per square mile (290.8/km^{2}). There were 203 housing units at an average density of 634.4 per square mile (244.9/km^{2}). The racial makeup of the town was 97.9% White, 0.4% Native American, 1.2% from other races, and 0.4% from two or more races. Hispanic or Latino of any race were 1.7% of the population.

There were 136 households, of which 14.7% had children under the age of 18 living with them, 39.7% were married couples living together, 3.7% had a female householder with no husband present, 2.2% had a male householder with no wife present, and 54.4% were non-families. 51.5% of all households were made up of individuals, and 30.9% had someone living alone who was 65 years of age or older. The average household size was 1.77 and the average family size was 2.58.

The median age in the town was 52.9 years. 14.9% of residents were under the age of 18; 4.2% were between the ages of 18 and 24; 16.1% were from 25 to 44; 31.9% were from 45 to 64; and 32.8% were 65 years of age or older. The gender makeup of the town was 49.0% male and 51.0% female.

=== 2000 census ===
As of the census of 2000, there were 339 people, 164 households, and 83 families residing in the town. The population density was 1,061.4 inhabitants per square mile (409.8/km^{2}). There were 204 housing units at an average density of 638.7 per square mile (246.6/km^{2}). The racial makeup of the town was 99.41% White, and 0.59% from two or more races. Hispanic or Latino of any race were 0.29% of the population.

There were 164 households, out of which 25.0% had children under the age of 18 living with them, 47.0% were married couples living together, 3.0% had a female householder with no husband present, and 48.8% were non-families. 47.6% of all households were made up of individuals, and 30.5% had someone living alone who was 65 years of age or older. The average household size was 2.07 and the average family size was 3.05.

In the town, the population was spread out, with 24.2% under the age of 18, 5.6% from 18 to 24, 24.5% from 25 to 44, 19.2% from 45 to 64, and 26.5% who were 65 years of age or older. The median age was 41 years. For every 100 females, there were 91.5 males. For every 100 females age 18 and over, there were 86.2 males.

The median income for a household in the town was $24,545, and the median income for a family was $36,250. Males had a median income of $23,194 versus $18,750 for females. The per capita income for the town was $13,109. About 7.5% of families and 10.8% of the population were below the poverty line, including none of those under age 18 and 25.5% of those age 65 or over.

== Notable person ==
- Duane Putnam, former offensive guard and coach in the NFL
