= National Register of Historic Places listings in Bon Homme County, South Dakota =

Location of Bon Homme County in South Dakota

This is a list of the National Register of Historic Places listings in Bon Homme County, South Dakota.

This is intended to be a complete list of the properties and districts on the National Register of Historic Places in Bon Homme County, South Dakota. The locations of National Register properties and districts for which the latitude and longitude coordinates are included below, may be seen in a map.

There are 41 properties and districts listed on the National Register in the county.

This National Park Service list is complete through NPS recent listings posted May 1, 2026.

== Current listings ==
| | Name on the Register | Image | Date listed | Location | City or town | Description |
|---|---|---|---|---|---|---|
| 1 | Beseda Hall and Sokol Park | | October 30, 2024 (#100010929) | 115 N. Lidice Street; 42°56′55″N 97°39′32″W | Tabor | |
| 2 | Bon Homme County Courthouse | Bon Homme County Courthouse | December 13, 1984 (#84000581) | 300 W. 18th Ave. 42°59′38″N 97°51′58″W | Tyndall | |
| 3 | Bon Homme Hutterite Colony | Bon Homme Hutterite Colony | June 30, 1982 (#82003913) | On the Missouri River; 42°51′46″N 97°42′23″W | Tabor | |
| 4 | Gen. Charles T. Campbell House | | June 17, 1982 (#82003911) | 611 4th St. 43°08′58″N 97°42′57″W | Scotland | |
| 5 | Carnegie Public Library of Tyndall | Carnegie Public Library of Tyndall | December 13, 1984 (#84000582) | 110 W. 17th Ave. 42°59′33″N 97°51′50″W | Tyndall | |
| 6 | Cihak Farmstead | | November 28, 1984 (#84001263) | Southeastern corner of the southwestern quadrant of Section 2, T96N, R60W; 43°09′21″N 97°54′17″W | Scotland | |
| 7 | John Frydrych Farmstead | John Frydrych Farmstead | July 6, 1987 (#87001053) | Northern side of Highway 50; 42°58′41″N 97°46′37″W | Tyndall | |
| 8 | Dr. John C. Greenfield House | Dr. John C. Greenfield House | October 19, 1989 (#89001717) | 307 W. 1st St. 43°00′19″N 98°03′46″W | Avon | |
| 9 | John Hakl Chalkrock House | | June 7, 1987 (#87001050) | Southwest of Tabor off Highway 50; 42°56′22″N 97°41′34″W | Tabor | |
| 10 | Joseph Herman Chalkrock House | | July 6, 1987 (#87001045) | Western side of Highway 25; 42°58′02″N 97°43′13″W | Tabor | |
| 11 | Joseph Herman Log Stable | | July 6, 1987 (#87001047) | Western side of Highway 25; 42°58′03″N 97°43′14″W | Tabor | |
| 12 | Joseph Herman Rubblestone Barn | | July 6, 1987 (#87001046) | Western side of Highway 25; 42°58′03″N 97°43′11″W | Tabor | |
| 13 | Martin Honner Chalkrock House | | July 6, 1987 (#87001052) | Northwest of Tabor off Highway 50; 42°57′15″N 97°40′37″W | Tabor | |
| 14 | Koobs House | Koobs House | August 1, 1984 (#84003218) | 631 4th St. 43°08′56″N 97°42′57″W | Scotland | |
| 15 | Main Hall | | February 3, 1981 (#81000572) | Former University of South Dakota – Springfield campus 42°51′32″N 97°53′50″W | Springfield | |
| 16 | John and Kate Merkwan Log and Rubblestone House | | July 6, 1987 (#87001041) | Eastern side of Highway 25; 43°00′24″N 97°42′31″W | Tabor | |
| 17 | John and Kate Merkwan Rubblestone House-Barn | | July 6, 1987 (#87001040) | Eastern side of Highway 25; 43°00′24″N 97°42′33″W | Tabor | |
| 18 | John Merkwan, Jr. Rubblestone House | | July 6, 1987 (#87001044) | Western side of Highway 25; 43°00′16″N 97°42′59″W | Tabor | |
| 19 | Methodist Episcopal Church | Methodist Episcopal Church | September 12, 1979 (#79002397) | 811 6th St. 43°08′51″N 97°42′48″W | Scotland | |
| 20 | William Metzgers New Emporium | William Metzgers New Emporium | October 7, 2001 (#01001079) | 1610 Main St. 42°59′30″N 97°51′46″W | Tyndall | |
| 21 | Peter and Minnie Monfore House | Peter and Minnie Monfore House | October 31, 2002 (#02001287) | 612 12th St. 42°51′32″N 97°53′38″W | Springfield | |
| 22 | Joseph Noll Chalkrock Barn | | July 6, 1987 (#87001049) | South of Tabor off Highway 50; 42°56′12″N 97°39′48″W | Tabor | |
| 23 | Old St. Wenceslaus Catholic Parish House | Old St. Wenceslaus Catholic Parish House | February 8, 1988 (#88000023) | 227 Yankton St. 42°56′59″N 97°39′28″W | Tabor | |
| 24 | Perkins Congregational Church | | March 14, 2019 (#100003448) | 31205 409th St. 42°51′53″N 98°00′39″W | Springfield vicinity | |
| 25 | St. Andrew's Episcopal Church | St. Andrew's Episcopal Church | June 17, 1982 (#82003912) | 4th and Poplar Sts. 43°08′30″N 97°42′59″W | Scotland | |
| 26 | St. Wenceslaus Catholic Church and Parish House | St. Wenceslaus Catholic Church and Parish House | December 13, 1984 (#84000579) | Yankton and Lidice Sts. 42°57′02″N 97°39′31″W | Tabor | |
| 27 | Scotland Main Street Historic District | Scotland Main Street Historic District | December 9, 1999 (#99001429) | Along Main St., roughly bounded by Railway, Poplar, 3rd, and Juniper Sts. 43°08′58″N 97°43′05″W | Scotland | |
| 28 | Scotland Residential Historic District | Scotland Residential Historic District | December 13, 1995 (#95001439) | Roughly bounded by Chestnut, 5th, Juniper and 3rd Sts. 43°09′04″N 97°42′57″W | Scotland | |
| 29 | Scotland Royal Theater | | October 31, 1996 (#96001224) | 565 Main St. 43°08′58″N 97°43′09″W | Scotland | |
| 30 | Jacob Sedlacek Chalkrock House | | July 6, 1987 (#87001051) | Southwest of Tabor off Highway 50; 42°56′06″N 97°41′28″W | Tabor | |
| 31 | South Dakota Dept. of Transportation Bridge No. 05-028-200 | South Dakota Dept. of Transportation Bridge No. 05-028-200 | December 9, 1993 (#93001270) | Local road over Choteau Creek; 42°52′48″N 98°06′49″W | Perkins | |
| 32 | South Dakota Dept. of Transportation Bridge No. 05-032-170 | South Dakota Dept. of Transportation Bridge No. 05-032-170 | December 9, 1993 (#93001271) | Local road over Choteau Creek; 42°55′24″N 98°06′23″W | Avon | |
| 33 | South Dakota Dept. of Transportation Bridge No. 05-138-080 | South Dakota Dept. of Transportation Bridge No. 05-138-080 | December 9, 1993 (#93001272) | 299 Street west of 415 Avenue; 43°03′13″N 97°53′40″W | Tyndall | |
| 34 | South Dakota Dept. of Transportation Bridge No. 05-255-130 | | December 9, 1993 (#93001273) | Local road over Beaver Creek; 42°58′52″N 97°39′53″W | Tabor | |
| 35 | Tabor School | Tabor School | September 2, 1983 (#83003001) | Vancura Memorial Park; 42°56′54″N 97°39′31″W | Tabor | |
| 36 | Teibel–Sykora Rubblestone Barn | | July 6, 1987 (#87001048) | Western side of Highway 25; 43°01′17″N 97°43′16″W | Tabor | |
| 37 | Thompson House | Thompson House | October 23, 2003 (#03001076) | 30985 421st. Ave. 42°53′44″N 97°46′26″W | Springfield | |
| 38 | John Travnicek Chalkrock House | | July 6, 1987 (#87001043) | Western side of junction of Highway 50 and Highway 25; 42°57′46″N 97°42′55″W | Tabor | |
| 39 | Joseph V. Wagner House | Joseph V. Wagner House | June 6, 2001 (#01000633) | 112 Lidice St. 42°56′56″N 97°39′33″W | Tabor | |
| 40 | Albion Walker Chalkrock House | | July 6, 1987 (#87001042) | South of Highway 52; 42°54′10″N 97°39′36″W | Tabor | |
| 41 | ZCBJ Hall | ZCBJ Hall | January 31, 1985 (#85000181) | 1910 Ivy Street; 42°59′44″N 97°51′57″W | Tyndall | |

== See also ==
- List of National Historic Landmarks in South Dakota
- National Register of Historic Places listings in South Dakota
