= Czech South Dakotans =

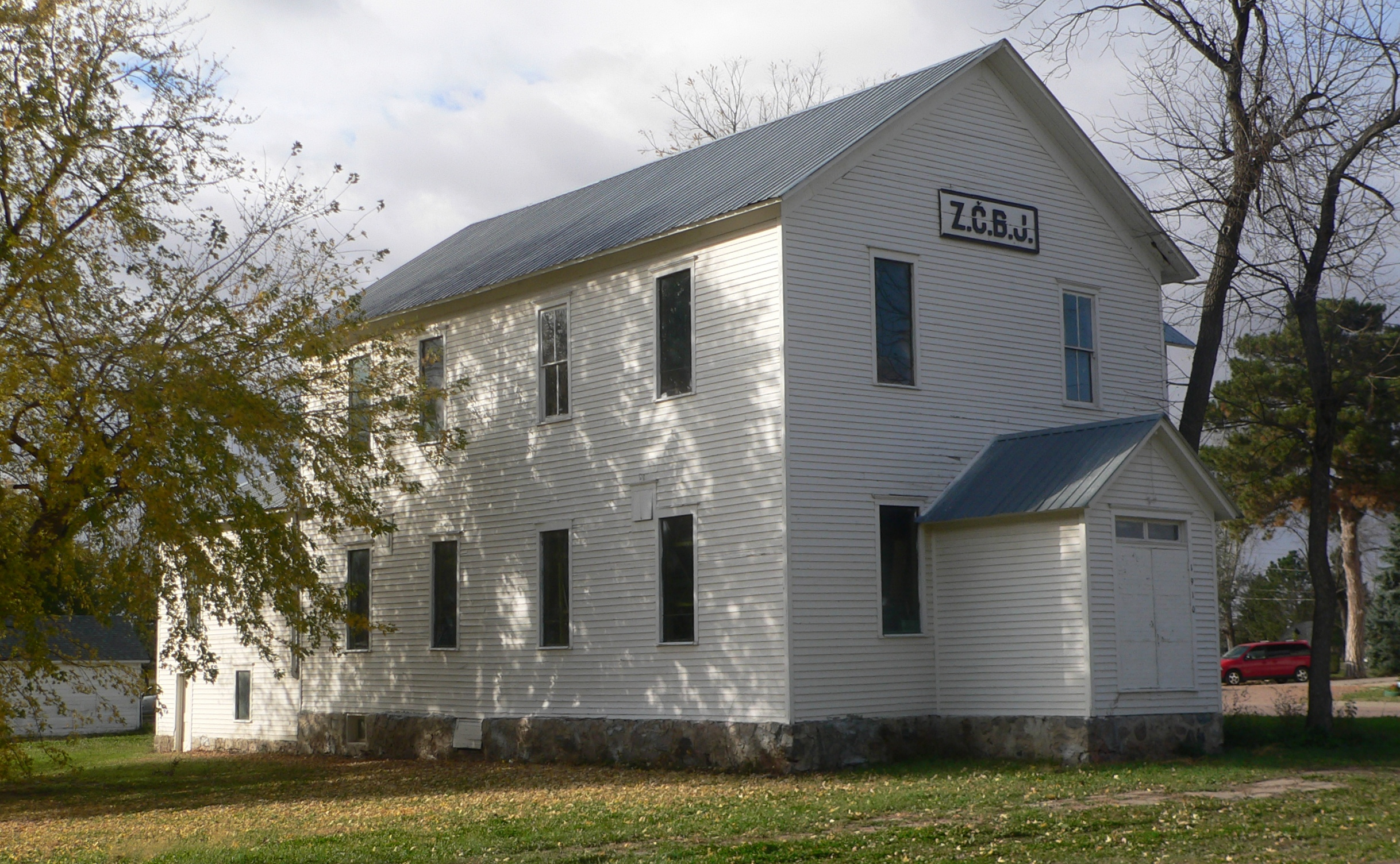
ZCBJ Hall, an historic meeting hall for the Czech community in Tyndall, South Dakota.

Czech South Dakotans are residents of the state of South Dakota who are of Czech ancestry. The Czech language is the seventh most common language spoken in South Dakota, with 645 speakers.

== History ==
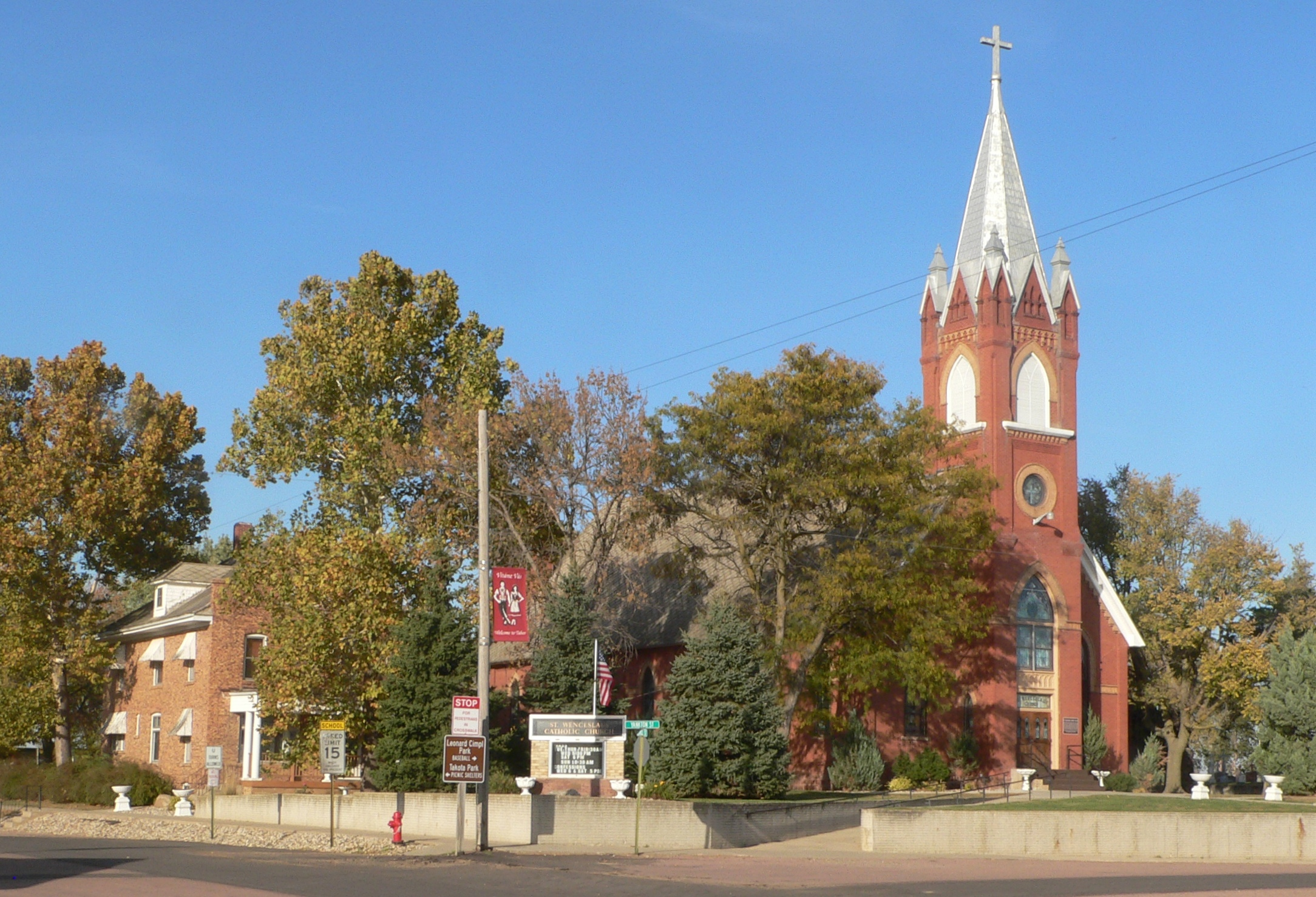
St. Wenceslaus Catholic Church and Parish House, a Catholic parish in Tabor founded by Bohemian immigrants.

The first Czech immigrants started arriving in Dakota Territory in 1868, and settled west of Yankton. These poor people from Bohemia came to America with hope of improving their living conditions and attaining a better future. The majority of Czechs settled around Tabor. Being mostly of the Catholic faith, their first concern was to organize a religious community. Church services first started taking place in 1871 at the log home of Vaclav Janda, one mile south of Tabor. The town site of Tabor was purchased from Johanna Kocer on April 14, 1872. In that same year, work began at the north end of the site for the first church of the St. Wenceslaus parish. The church was completed in 1874, and was constructed of chalk rock cut near the Missouri River south of Tabor. The chalk rock church was quickly outgrown, and a new 42 X 132 red brick church was built in 1898. The brick church still serves as the House of the Lord for today's parishioners. Since St. Wenceslaus Church is the only church in a town of 400 people, parish activities and functions are social highlights for the community.

Although the Czech population in the state was small, their high concentration in certain regions had a profound impact on the cultural history of South Dakota. The Czech population of the state was concentrated in five southeastern counties: Bon Homme, Brule County, Charles Mix, Gregory County, and Yankton. In 1910, 90% of Czechs in South Dakota lived in these five counties and 60% lived in the two counties of Bon Homme and Yankton. By 1930, Czech-Americans only comprised 1.5% of the population of South Dakota.
