= Old St. Wenceslaus Catholic Parish House =

Historic house in South Dakota, United States

- U.S. National Register of Historic Places
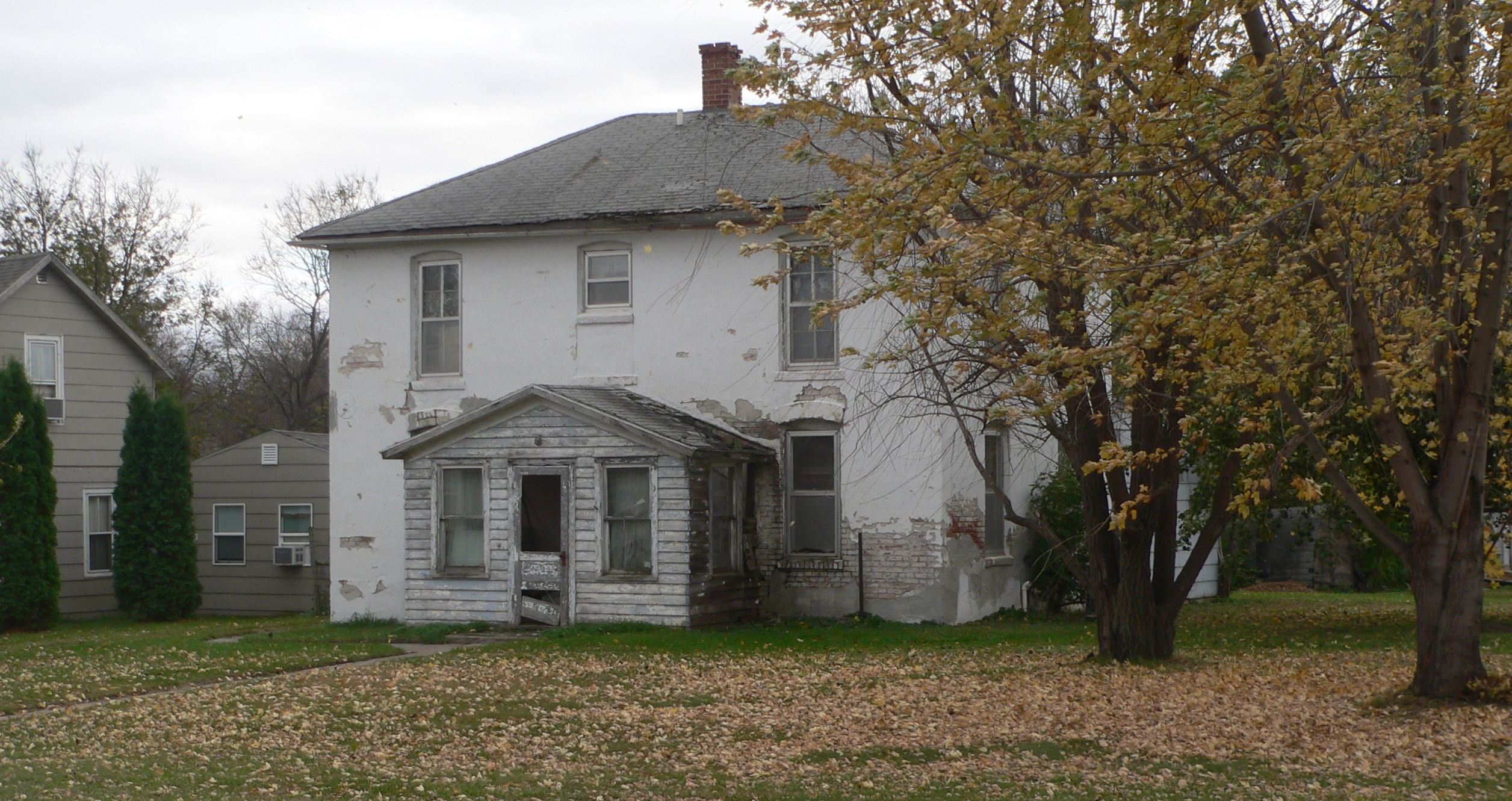

- Location within South Dakota Location within the United States
- Location: 227 Yankton St., Tabor, South Dakota
- Coordinates: 42.949852°N 97.657787°W
- Built: 1878
- Architectural style: Italianate
- NRHP reference No.: 88000023
- Added to NRHP: February 8, 1988

The Old St. Wenceslaus Catholic Parish House is a house located in Tabor, South Dakota. It was constructed by immigrants from Bohemia in 1878. It was used as the residence of the pastor of St. Wenceslaus Church until 1910, when it was replaced by a new building.

The former rectory is the oldest brick structure in the city of Tabor. It was added to the National Register of Historic Places on February 8, 1988, as part of a "Thematic Nomination of Czech Folk Architecture of Southeastern South Dakota".

== See also ==
- National Register of Historic Places listings in Bon Homme County, South Dakota
