= Bon Homme County Courthouse =

- U.S. National Register of Historic Places
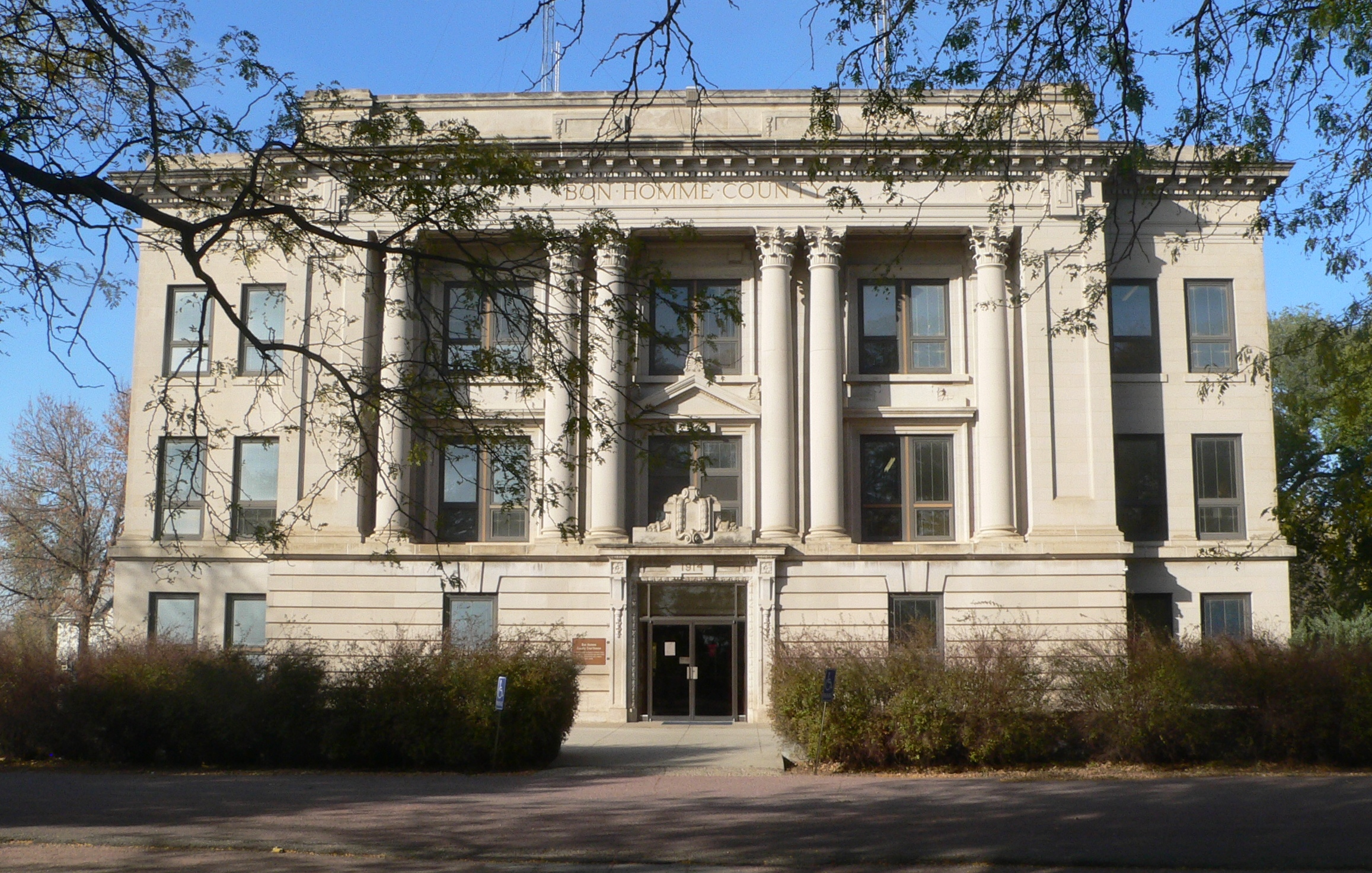
- The courthouse in 2015

- Location within South Dakota Location within the United States
- Location: Walnut and Washington Streets, Tyndall, South Dakota
- Coordinates: 42°59′38″N 97°51′56″W
- Area: 3 acres (1.2 ha)
- Built: 1914
- Built by: A. M. Wold Company
- Architect: A. Schartz
- Architectural style: Beaux Arts
- NRHP reference No.: 84000581
- Added to NRHP: December 13, 1984

The Bon Homme County Courthouse is a historic three-story building in Tyndall, South Dakota, and the courthouse of Bon Homme County, South Dakota. It was designed in the Beaux-Arts style by architect A. Schartz, and built with granite by the A. M. Wold Company in 1914. Inside, there are murals painted by A.E. Soderberg, an immigrant from Sweden who worked for Oyen Studios. The building has been listed on the National Register of Historic Places since December 13, 1984.
