= South Dakota Highway 46 =

State highway in South Dakota, United States

Highway 46

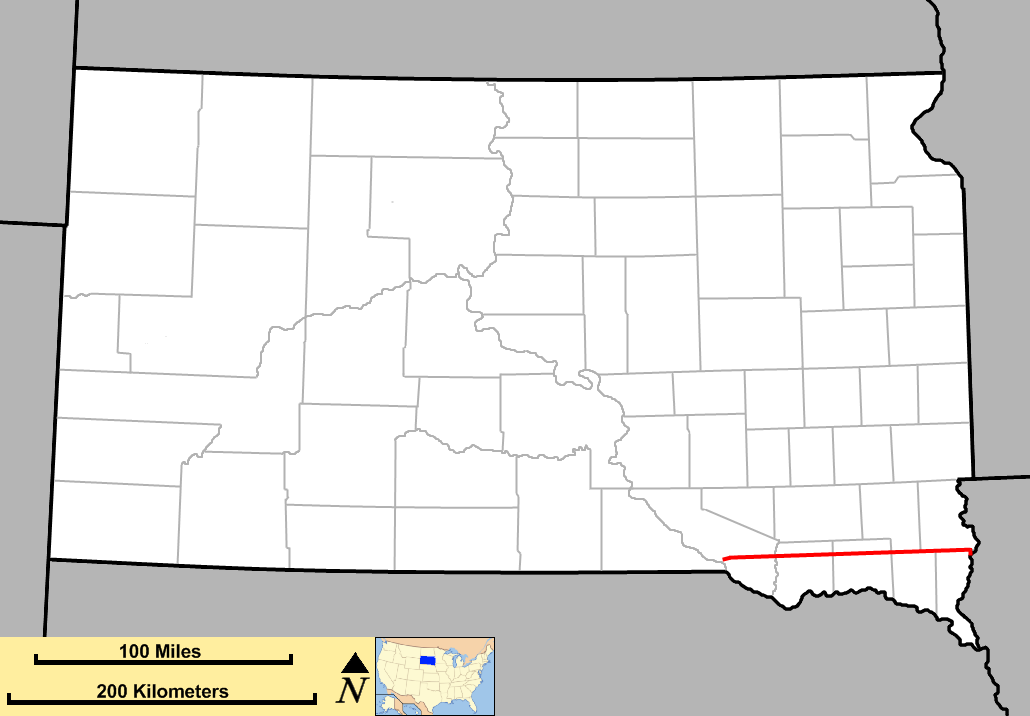
- Route of SD 46 (in red)

Route information
- Maintained by SDDOT
- Length: 105.535 mi (169.842 km)
- Existed: 1936–present

Major junctions
- West end: US 18 / US 281 in Pickstown
- I-29 in Beresford; US 81 near Mayfield
- East end: Iowa 10 at the Iowa state line near Hawarden, IA

Location
- Country: United States
- State: South Dakota
- Counties: Charles Mix; Bon Homme; Yankton County; Clay; Turner; Lincoln; Union

Highway system
- South Dakota State Trunk Highway System; Interstate; US; State
← SD 45	→ SD 47

South Dakota Highway 46 is a 105.535-mile (169.842 km) state highway in South Dakota, United States, that runs west to east across the southeastern part of the state. It begins at the junction of U.S. Highway 18 and U.S. Highway 281 in Pickstown, and runs due east to nearly the Iowa border, before curving south to cross the border and meeting Iowa Highway 10.

== History ==
South Dakota 46 was established around 1935. Its initial alignment only extended west to U.S. Highway 81. The extension further west occurred around 1960.

== Major intersections ==
County	Location	mi	km	Destinations	Notes
Charles Mix	Pickstown	0.000	0.000	US 18 / US 281 – Burke, Lake Andes	
Charles Mix	Wagner	11.598	18.665	SD 50 west to US 18 / US 281	Western end of SD 50 concurrency
Charles Mix		20.437	32.890	SD 50 east – Avon, Tyndall	Eastern end of SD 50 concurrency
Bon Homme		28.439	45.768	SD 37 to SD 50 – Parkston	
Bon Homme		41.353	66.551	SD 25 to SD 50 – Scotland	
Yankton		57.437	92.436	US 81 – Yankton, Freeman	
Clay–Turner county line		73.511	118.304	SD 19 north – Viborg	Western end of SD 19 concurrency
Clay–Turner county line		79.501	127.944	SD 19 south / SD 19A north – Vermillion, Centerville	Eastern end of SD 19 concurrency
Union–Lincoln county line	Beresford	87.982	141.593	I-29 – Elk Point, Sioux Falls	I-29 Exit 47
Union–Lincoln county line		96.503	155.307	SD 11 – Alcester, Canton	
Big Sioux River		105.535	169.842	South Dakota–Iowa state line	
Big Sioux River		105.535	169.842	Iowa 10 east – Hawarden	Continuation into Iowa
1.000 mi = 1.609 km; 1.000 km = 0.621 mi: Concurrency terminus

== See also ==
- List of state highways in South Dakota
