= August Goetz =

August Goetz (born 1855) was a building contractor based in Yankton, South Dakota who is credited with constructing many churches, public buildings, and houses throughout the state. Several of his works are listed on the National Register of Historic Places (NRHP).

He was born in Wiesbaden, Germany on August 10, 1855. He apprenticed as a carpenter for three years. He came to the United States in 1881 and to Yankton in 1882.

Works include (with attribution):

- St. Agnes Catholic Church (1892), 202 Washington St., Vermillion, SD (designed by Anton Dohmen, built by August Goetz), NRHP-listed
- St. Wenceslaus Catholic Church (1898), Yankton and Lidice Sts., Tabor, SD (built by August O. Goetz), NRHP-listed
- Yankton Carnegie Library (1902-03), 4th and Capitol Sts., Yankton, South Dakota (built by August Goetz), NRHP-listed
- Carnegie Public Library of Tyndall (1917), State and Main Sts., Tyndall, SD (designed by Beutler and Arnold Architects, built by Goetz Construction Co., both of Sioux City, Iowa), NRHP-listed.
