= Joseph Noll Chalkrock Barn =

- U.S. National Register of Historic Places
- Location within South Dakota Location within the United States
- Location: South of Tabor off Highway 50, Tabor, South Dakota
- Coordinates: 42°56′12″N 97°39′48″W
- Architectural style: Czech folk architecture
- NRHP reference No.: 87001049
- Added to NRHP: July 6, 1987

The Joseph Noll Chalkrock Barn is a historic barn located near Tabor, South Dakota, United States. It was added to the National Register of Historic Places on July 6, 1987, as part of a "Thematic Nomination of Czech Folk Architecture of Southeastern South Dakota".

== See also ==
- National Register of Historic Places listings in Bon Homme County, South Dakota
