= Tabor School =

- U.S. National Register of Historic Places
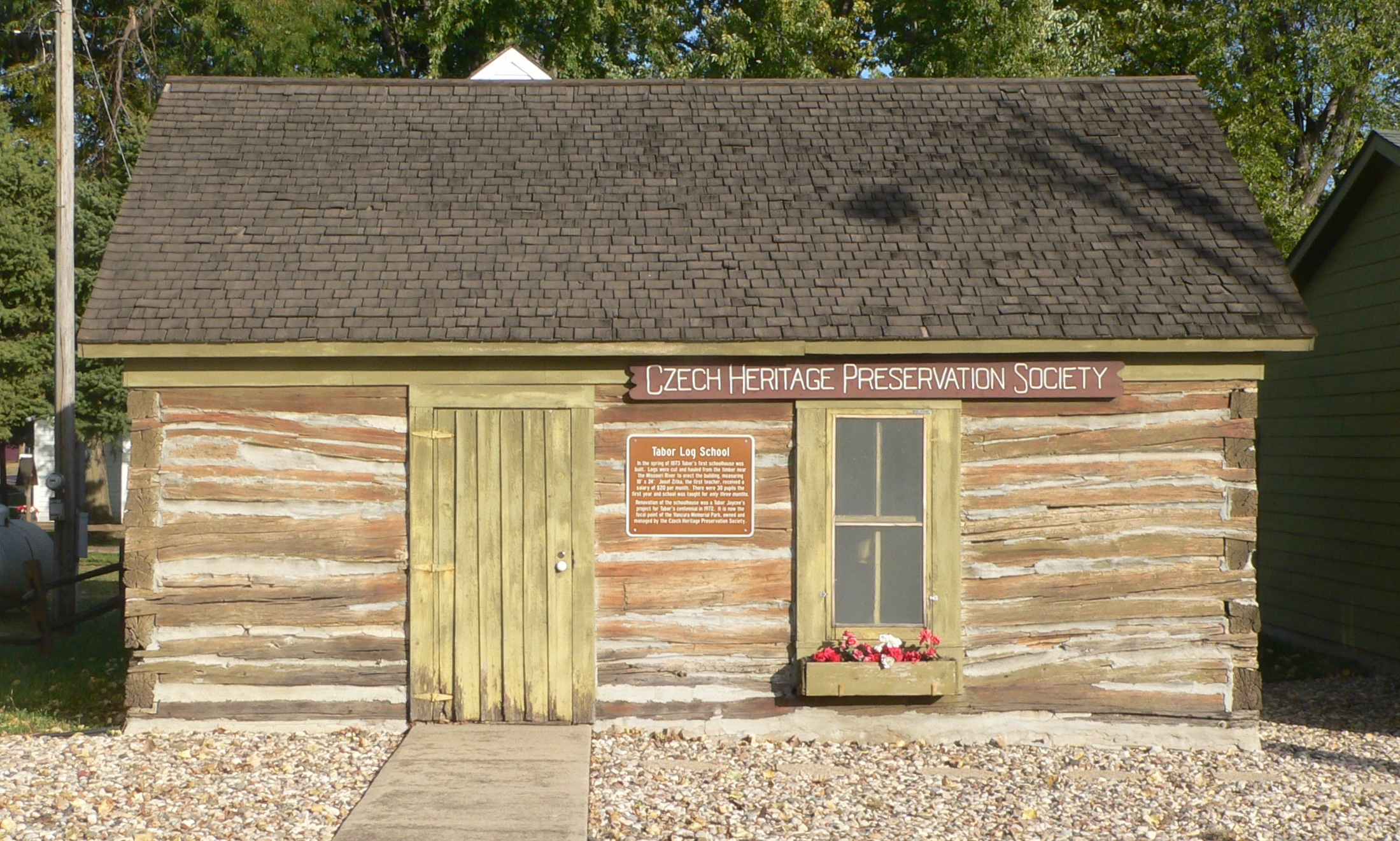
- Tabor School in 2015

- Location within South Dakota Location within the United States
- Location: SD 50, Tabor, South Dakota
- Coordinates: 42°56′51″N 97°39′30″W
- Area: 0.5 acres (0.20 ha)
- Built: 1873
- Built by: Richard Nundvar
- NRHP reference No.: 83003001
- Added to NRHP: September 2, 1983

Tabor School is a historic school building in Tabor, South Dakota, United States. It was built in 1873 and was converted into a house in 1883. It was listed on the National Register of Historic Places in 1983 for its historical significance to Czech South Dakotans and to the local area.

== History ==
The first settlers of Tabor, South Dakota, were Czech immigrants who arrived in 1869 and founded the town in 1872 as a farming center. The need for local education was soon identified. Richard Nundvar, a local carpenter, oversaw construction of the log cabin that would serve as a school building. It was constructed on the main street of Tabor in what is today a park. The first class consisted of 20 students, taught by Joseph Zitka, a teacher and Dakota Territory legislator. Classes were taught in both the Czech and English languages. In 1882, a new, larger school building was built. The original school was moved 200 yards (180 m) away and was converted into a private residence the following year.

In 1975, the building was renovated and then acquired for preservation by the Czech Heritage Preservation Society. It was listed on the National Register of Historic Places on September 2, 1983, for its historic significance to Czech American culture and local history.

== Architecture ==
The Tabor School is constructed from logs from cottonwood trees, linked together using a dove-tail design. The school building's footprint measures 18 by 24 feet (5.5 m × 7.3 m). A rear addition was added after cabin was converted into a house.

== See also ==
- National Register of Historic Places listings in Bon Homme County, South Dakota
