= John Frydrych Farmstead =

Historic house in South Dakota, United States

- U.S. National Register of Historic Places
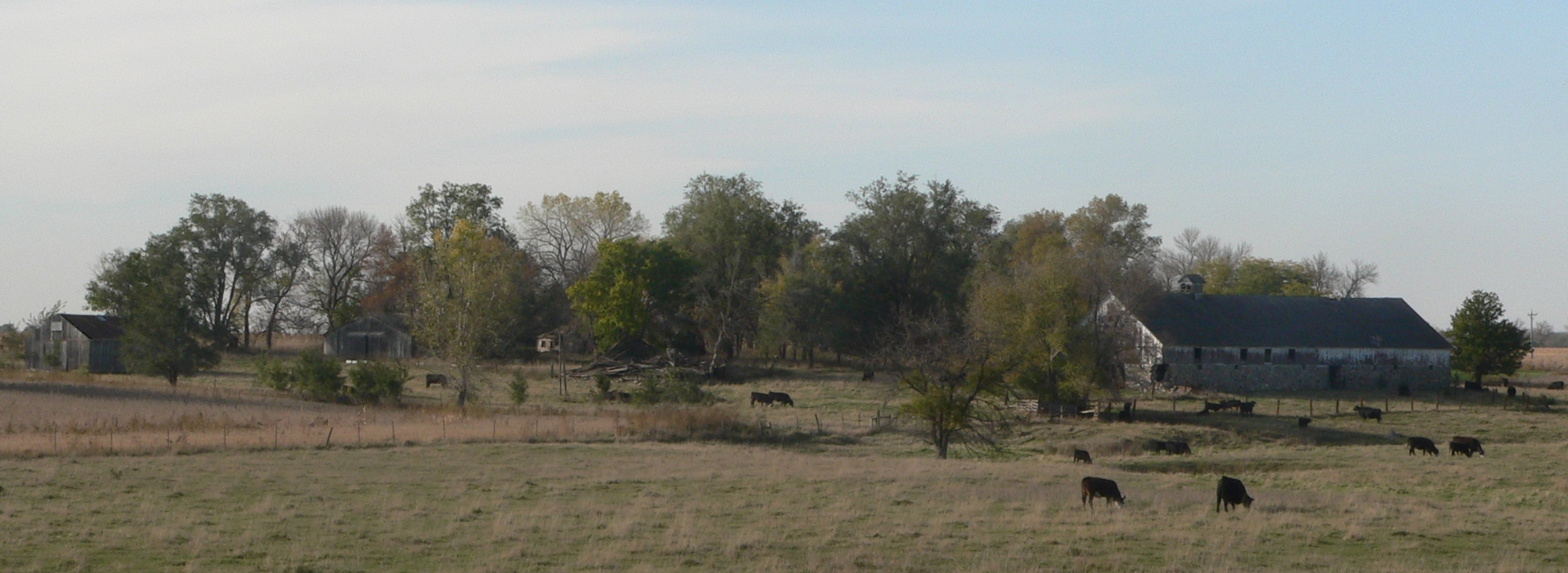

- Location within South Dakota Location within the United States
- Location: Northern side of Highway 50, Tyndall, South Dakota
- Coordinates: 42.978091°N 97.776897°W
- Architectural style: Czech folk architecture
- NRHP reference No.: 87001053
- Added to NRHP: July 6, 1987

The John Frydrych Farmstead is a farmstead located in Tyndall, South Dakota, United States. It was added to the National Register of Historic Places on July 6, 1987, as part of a "Thematic Nomination of Czech Folk Architecture of Southeastern South Dakota".

== See also ==
- National Register of Historic Places listings in Bon Homme County, South Dakota
