= South Dakota Highway 37 =

State highway in South Dakota, United States

Highway 37

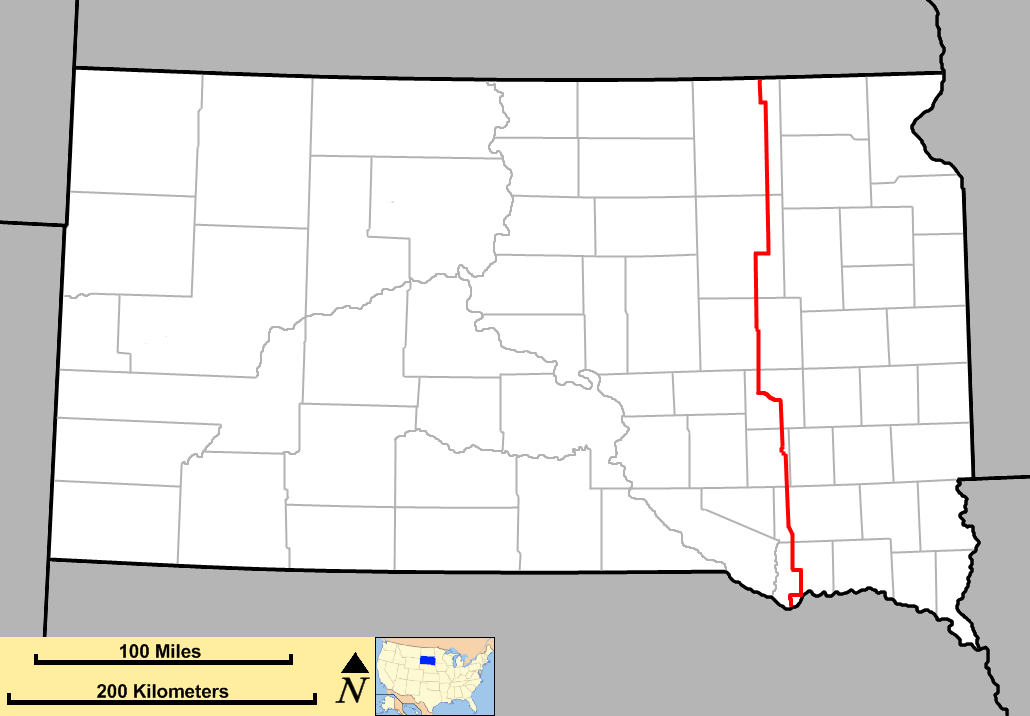
- Route of SD 37 (in red)

Route information
- Maintained by SDDOT
- Length: 242 mi (389 km)
- Existed: 1926–present

Major junctions
- South end: N-14 at the Nebraska border in Running Water
- US 18 northwest of Tripp; I-90 in Mitchell; US 14 in Huron; US 212 in Doland; SD 20 in Conde; US 12 in Groton
- North end: ND 1 at the North Dakota border in Hecla

Location
- Country: United States
- State: South Dakota
- Counties: Bon Homme; Hutchinson; Davison; Sanborn; Beadle; Spink; Brown

Highway system
- South Dakota State Trunk Highway System; Interstate; US; State
| ← SD 36 | → SD 38 |

South Dakota Highway 37 (SD 37) is a state route that runs across eastern South Dakota. It begins at the Nebraska border northeast of Niobrara, Nebraska, as a continuation of Nebraska Highway 14. It runs to the North Dakota border north of Hecla, where it continues as North Dakota Highway 1. It is 242 miles (389 km) in length.

== History ==
South Dakota 37 was in place by 1926, and largely has used the same alignment since. The only significant exception was in northeast South Dakota, where SD 37 originally went westward from Groton to Bath, then north via Columbia to Houghton, where it continued to Hecla. This segment was rerouted to the current alignment by 1929.

On the south end, the road ended at the Missouri River at Running Water. A seasonal ferry was in place to carry traffic across the river. A direct connection via bridge did not open until 1998 when the Chief Standing Bear Memorial Bridge was completed.

In the early and mid-1930s, the segment between Huron and Tripp was co-numbered as U.S. Route 281. This concurrency was dropped by 1936, when US 281 was realigned further west.

The segment between Huron and Mitchell was upgraded to a 4-lane expressway, and was largely completed by 2004. A minor rerouting around the west end of Mitchell occurred, resulting in a 2-mile (3.2 km) concurrency with Interstate 90.

== Legal definition ==
The route of SD 37 is defined in South Dakota Codified Laws § 31-4-158.

== Major intersections ==
| County | Location | mi | km | Destinations | Notes |
|---|---|---|---|---|---|
| Bon Homme | | 0.00 | 0.00 | N-14 south – Niobrara | Continuation into Nebraska |
| Bon Homme | Running Water | 0.63 | 1.01 | SD 37P | Northern terminus of Running Water SD 37P segment |
| Bon Homme | Springfield | 11.94 | 19.22 | SD 37P | Northern terminus of Springfield SD 37P segment |
| Bon Homme | | 14.52 | 23.37 | SD 52 east – Yankton | Western terminus of SD 52 |
| Bon Homme | | 20.42 | 32.86 | SD 50 east – Tyndall | Eastern end of SD 50 concurrency |
| Bon Homme | | 24.44 | 39.33 | SD 50 west – Avon | Western end of SD 50 concurrency |
| Bon Homme | | 30.44 | 48.99 | SD 46 – Wagner | |
| Hutchinson | | 39.22 | 63.12 | SD 37A – Tripp | Southern terminus of SD 37A |
| Hutchinson | | 41.63 | 67.00 | US 18 – Canton | |
| Hutchinson | Parkston | 51.59 | 83.03 | SD 44 – Platte | |
| Davison | | 62.59 | 100.73 | SD 42 – Ethan | |
| Davison | Mitchell | 72.97 | 117.43 | I-90 east / I-90 BL – Sioux Falls | Eastern end of I-90 concurrency, Exit 332; I-90 Bus. is a continuation north of the I-90 interchange |
| Davison | Mitchell | 73.10 | 117.64 | I-90 west / I-90 BL – Rapid City | Western end of I-90 concurrency, Exit 330; southern end of I-90 Bus. concurrency |
| Davison | Mitchell | 73.75 | 118.69 | I-90 BL | Northern end of I-90 Bus. concurrency |
| Sanborn | | 95.64 | 153.92 | SD 34 east – Artesian | Eastern end of SD 34 concurrency |
| Sanborn | | 105.83 | 170.32 | SD 34 west – Woonsocket | Western end of SD 34 concurrency |
| Sanborn | | 114.88 | 184.88 | SD 224 west – Alpena | Eastern terminus of SD 224 |
| Beadle | Huron | 127.72 | 205.55 | US 14 – Pierre, DeSmet | |
| Beadle–Spink county line | | 145.87 | 234.76 | SD 28 – Hitchcock | |
| Spink | | 164.02 | 263.96 | US 212 west – Redfield | Western end of US 212 concurrency |
| Spink | Doland | 169.40 | 272.62 | US 212 east – Clark | Eastern end of US 212 concurrency |
| Spink | | 184.44 | 296.83 | SD 20 east – Watertown | Southern end of SD 20 concurrency |
| Spink | Conde | 187.45 | 301.67 | SD 20 west – Brentford | Northern end of SD 20 concurrency |
| Brown | Groton | 208.43 | 335.44 | US 12 – Aberdeen, Webster | |
| Brown | | 231.51 | 372.58 | SD 10 east – Britton | Eastern end of SD 10 concurrency |
| Brown | | 233.51 | 375.80 | SD 10 west – Leola | Western end of SD 10 concurrency |
| Brown | | 243.63 | 392.08 | ND 1 north – Ludden | Continuation into North Dakota |
1.000 mi = 1.609 km; 1.000 km = 0.621 mi: Concurrency terminus

== Related routes ==
=== Highway 37A ===
Highway 37A
- Location: Tripp
- Length: 2.4 mi (3.9 km)

South Dakota Highway 37A (SD 37A) is a north–south state highway in the U.S. state of South Dakota. SD 37A's southern terminus is at SD 37 in Tripp, and the northern terminus is at US 18 north of Tripp.

=== Highway 37P ===
Highway 37P
- Location: Running Water, Springfield
- Length: 2.46 mi (3.96 km)

South Dakota Highway 37P (SD 37P) consists of two spur routes off the SD 37 mainline. The southern spur occurs just north of the Nebraska state border, branching from SD 37 in Running Water and extending 1.13 miles (1.82 km) to CR 22 (Main St/The Bottom Rd). The northern spur occurs at the northern edge of Springfield, running through the city for 1.33 miles (2.14 km) before terminating at the intersection of CR 314 (8th St) and CR 414 (Wood St).

== See also ==
- List of state highways in South Dakota
