= Joseph Herman Rubblestone Barn =

- U.S. National Register of Historic Places
- Location within South Dakota Location within the United States
- Location: Western side of Highway 25, Tabor, South Dakota
- Coordinates: 42°58′03″N 97°43′11″W
- Architectural style: Czech folk architecture
- NRHP reference No.: 87001046
- Added to NRHP: July 6, 1987

The Joseph Herman Rubblestone Barn is a historic barn located in Tabor, South Dakota, United States. It was added to the National Register of Historic Places on July 6, 1987, as part of a "Thematic Nomination of Czech Folk Architecture of Southeastern South Dakota".

== See also ==
- National Register of Historic Places listings in Bon Homme County, South Dakota
