= Running Water, South Dakota =

- Census-designated place
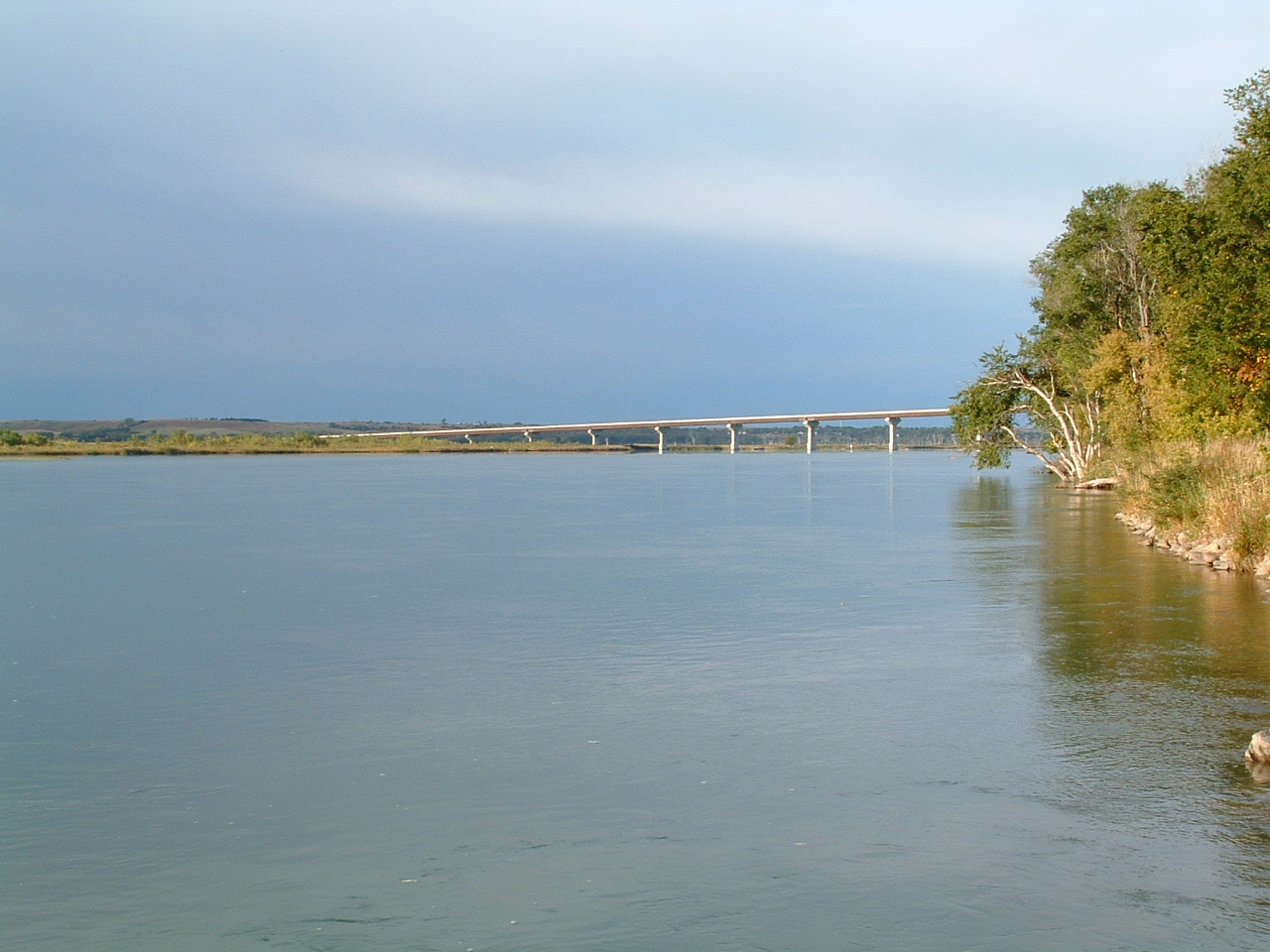
- Looking toward the Chief Standing Bear Bridge near the boat ramp

- Running Water
- Coordinates: 42°46′56″N 97°58′54″W
- Country: United States
- State: South Dakota
- County: Bon Homme

Area
  - Total: 2.09 sq mi (5.4 km^{2})
  - Land: 2.09 sq mi (5.4 km^{2})
  - Water: 0 sq mi (0.00 km^{2})
- Elevation: 1,417 ft (432 m)

Population (2020)
  - Total: 47
  - Density: 22/sq mi (8.7/km^{2})
- Time zone: UTC-6 (Central (CST))
  - Summer (DST): UTC-5 (CDT)
- Area code: 605
- GNIS feature ID: 2612514

Running Water is a census-designated place (CDP) in Bon Homme County, South Dakota, United States. The population was 47 at the 2020 census.

The community's name Running Water is a former variant name of the nearby Niobrara River.

== Geography ==
Running Water is located on the north side of the Missouri River in southern Bon Homme County along the South Dakota-Nebraska state line. South Dakota Highway 37 crosses the Missouri at Running Water, becoming Nebraska Highway 14 on the opposite shore. SD 37 leads north and east 10 miles (16 km) to Springfield, and NE 14 leads south and west 3 miles (5 km) to Niobrara.

According to the United States Census Bureau, the Running Water CDP has a total area of 2.1 square miles (5.4 km^{2}), all of it land.

Running Water is located along the upper portion of Lewis and Clark Lake, a Missouri River reservoir. The South Dakota Department of Game, Fish and Parks operates a small recreational area for lake and river access including a boat ramp at Running Water.

Running Water is famous for having a ferry boat that operated during the spring and fall from 1874 to 1984. This boat would haul people and vehicles across the Missouri River, between Running Water SD and Niobrara NE. The fare at one time was $1 per vehicle. The need for such a service was reduced or eliminated by the construction of Chief Standing Bear Bridge over the river for SD Highway 37 and NE Highway 14.

== Demographics ==
Historical population
Census	Pop.	Note	%±
2020	47		—
U.S. Decennial Census
