= John and Kate Merkwan Rubblestone House-Barn =

Historic house in South Dakota, United States

- U.S. National Register of Historic Places
- Location within South Dakota Location within the United States
- Location: Eastern side of Highway 25, Tabor, South Dakota
- Coordinates: 43°00′24″N 97°42′33″W
- Architectural style: Czech folk architecture
- NRHP reference No.: 87001040
- Added to NRHP: July 6, 1987

The John and Kate Merkwan Rubblestone House-Barn is a historic house located in Tabor, South Dakota, United States. The house was constructed circa 1900. It was added to the National Register of Historic Places on July 6, 1987, as part of a "Thematic Nomination of Czech Folk Architecture of Southeastern South Dakota".

== See also ==
- National Register of Historic Places listings in Bon Homme County, South Dakota
