= Joseph Herman Log Stable =

- U.S. National Register of Historic Places
- Location within South Dakota
- Location: Western side of Highway 25, Tabor, South Dakota
- Coordinates: 42°58′03″N 97°43′14″W
- Architectural style: Czech folk architecture
- NRHP reference No.: 87001047
- Added to NRHP: July 6, 1987

The Joseph Herman Log Stable is a historic stable located in Tabor, South Dakota. It was added to the National Register of Historic Places on July 6, 1987, as part of a "Thematic Nomination of Czech Folk Architecture of Southeastern South Dakota".

== See also ==
- National Register of Historic Places listings in Bon Homme County, South Dakota
