= South Dakota Highway 153 =

State highway in South Dakota, United States

Highway 153
- 435th Avenue

Route information
- Maintained by SDDOT
- Length: 2.369 mi (3.813 km)

Major junctions
- South end: SD 52 west of Yankton
- North end: SD 50 west of Yankton

Location
- Country: United States
- State: South Dakota
- Counties: Yankton

Highway system
- South Dakota State Trunk Highway System; Interstate; US; State
← SD 147	→ SD 158

South Dakota Highway 153 (SD 153), also known as 435th Avenue, is a state highway in Yankton County, United States, that runs from SD 52 to SD 50.

== Route description ==
SD 153 begins at an intersection with SD 52 on the north edge of the Lewis & Clark Recreation Area, west of the city of Yankton. (SD 52 heads east to Yankton and heads westerly before curving north and then west to run concurrent with SR 50 through Lakeport. The road continues south for a short distance as Shore Drive to the marina of the recreation area.) From its southern terminus SD 153 heads north (but slightly west) along 435th Avenue through a rural residential area. The route then bends slightly to head directly north through rolling farmland until it reaches its northern terminus at SD 50. (435th Avenue continues north as County Road 211 through Utica and beyond to end at South Dakota Highway 49. SD 50 heads east to quickly connect with the northern end of South Dakota Highway 314 and then on through Yankton and beyond. SD 50 heads west to run concurrent with SD 52 through Lakeport.)

SD 153 is maintained by South Dakota Department of Transportation (SDDOT). In 2012, the traffic on the highway was measured in average annual daily traffic, and SD 153 had an average of 610 vehicles. The route is not a part of the National Highway System, a system of highways important to the nation's defense, economy, and mobility.

== Major intersections ==
The entire route is in Yankton County.

Location	mi	km	Destinations	Notes
Lewis & Clark Recreation Area	0.000	0.000	SD 52 – Yankton	Southern terminus
	2.369	3.813	SD 50 – Yankton, Tyndall	Northern terminus
1.000 mi = 1.609 km; 1.000 km = 0.621 mi
