= Teibel–Sykora Rubblestone Barn =

- U.S. National Register of Historic Places
- Location within South Dakota Location within the United States
- Location: Western side of Highway 25, Tabor, South Dakota
- Coordinates: 43°01′17″N 97°43′16″W
- Built: ca. 1900
- Architectural style: Czech folk architecture
- NRHP reference No.: 87001048
- Added to NRHP: July 6, 1987

The Teibel–Sykora Rubblestone Barn is a historic barn located in Tabor, South Dakota. The house was constructed circa 1900. It was added to the National Register of Historic Places on July 6, 1987, as part of a "Thematic Nomination of Czech Folk Architecture of Southeastern South Dakota".

== See also ==
- National Register of Historic Places listings in Bon Homme County, South Dakota
