= South Dakota Highway 314 =

State highway in South Dakota, United States

Highway 314

Route information
- Maintained by SDDOT
- Length: 3.751 mi (6.037 km)

Major junctions
- West end: SD 50 west of Yankton
- East end: West 11th Street in Yankton

Location
- Country: United States
- State: South Dakota
- Counties: Yankton

Highway system
- South Dakota State Trunk Highway System; Interstate; US; State
← SD 298	→ SD 324

South Dakota Highway 314 (SD 314) is a 3.751-mile-long (6.037 km) state highway in southwestern Yankton County, South Dakota, United States, that runs from SD 50 to the western city limits of Yankton.

== Route description ==
SD 314 is maintained by SDDOT. In 2012, the traffic on the route was measured in average annual daily traffic. SD 314 had an average of 1325 vehicles. SD 314 begins at an intersection with SD 50, west of Yankton, but about 0.6 miles (0.97 km) east of SD 50's junction with SD 153. From its western terminus SR 314 heads southeast through flat farmland to cross Deer Boulevard. After continuing southeast for total of 3.751 miles (6.037 km) SD 314 reaches its eastern terminus at an intersection with West 11th Street at the western city limits of Yankton.

== Major intersections ==
The entire route is in Yankton County.

Location	mi	km	Destinations	Notes
	0.000	0.000	SD 50 – Yankton, Lakeport, Tyndall	
Yankton	3.751	6.037	West 11th Street	
1.000 mi = 1.609 km; 1.000 km = 0.621 mi
