= Maria Pearson (activist) =

Yankton Dakota activist

Maria Darlene Pearson
- Hai-Mecha Eunka

Yankton Dakota activist leader

Personal details
- Born: Darlene Elvira Drappeaux; July 12, 1932 Springfield, South Dakota
- Died: May 23, 2003 (aged 70) Ames, Iowa
- Spouse(s): John Pearson, m. 1969
- Relations: 21 grandchildren, 15 great-grandchildren
- Children: Robert, Michael, Eldon, Ronald, Richard, and Darlene
- Parent(s): Winifred May Keeler and Joseph Luther Oscar Drappeaux
- Known for: "The Founding Mother of the modern Indian repatriation movement"

Maria Darlene Pearson or Hai-Mecha Eunka (lit. "Running Moccasins") (July 12, 1932 – May 23, 2003) was an activist who successfully challenged the legal treatment of Native American remains. A member of the Turtle Clan of the Yankton Sioux (which is a federally recognized tribe of Yankton Dakota), she was one of the primary catalysts for the creation of the Native American Graves Protection and Repatriation Act (NAGPRA). Her actions led to her being called "the Founding Mother of the modern Indian repatriation movement" and "the Rosa Parks of NAGPRA".

== Activism ==
Maria first became an active advocate for the repatriation of Native American human remains in 1971. At this time, the Iowa Highway Commission uncovered the skeletal remains of 26 European-American pioneers as well as the remains of a Native American woman and her infant child during road construction in Glenwood, Iowa. She learned of this from her husband, John Pearson, who was an engineer for the Iowa State Highway Commission. While the remains of the 26 white settlers were quickly reburied, the remains of a Native American mother and child were sent to the Office of the State Archaeologist in Iowa City for study. Learning of this incident, Maria was appalled that the skeletal remains of Native Americans were treated differently from white remains. Pearson staged a protest in the State Capitol and finally gained an audience with Gov. Robert D. Ray after sitting outside his office in traditional attire. "You can give me back my people's bones and you can quit digging them up" she responded when the governor asked what he could do for her. Maria continued to meet with legislators, archaeologists, anthropologists, physical anthropologists, and other tribal members, which led to the passage of the Iowa Burials Protection Act of 1976, the first legislative act in the U.S. that specifically protected Native American remains. Emboldened by her success, Pearson went on to lobby national leaders, and was one of the catalysts for the creation of NAGPRA. Pearson was featured in the 1995 BBC documentary Bones of Contention. Maria was also nominated twice for a Nobel Peace Prize for her substantial contributions toward the protection and repatriation of Native American remains.

== Personal ==
Maria Darlene Pearson (given name Darlene Elvira Drappeaux) was born in Springfield, South Dakota on July 12, 1932, when her mother gave her the Yankton name Hai-Mecha Eunka (translated as "Running Moccasins"). She married John Pearson in 1969, and spent most of her adult life in Iowa. Pearson had six children: Robert, Michael, Eldon, Ronald, Richard, and Darlene, and 21 grandchildren and 15 great-grandchildren. Pearson died in Ames, Iowa on May 23, 2003 at the age of 70.

Minnesota State legislator Heather Keeler and author/journalist Jacqueline Keeler are her first cousins once removed. Her mother, Winifred, was the sister of their grandfather, Edison Keeler.
