= St. Wenceslaus Catholic Church and Parish House =

Historic church in South Dakota, United States

- U.S. National Register of Historic Places
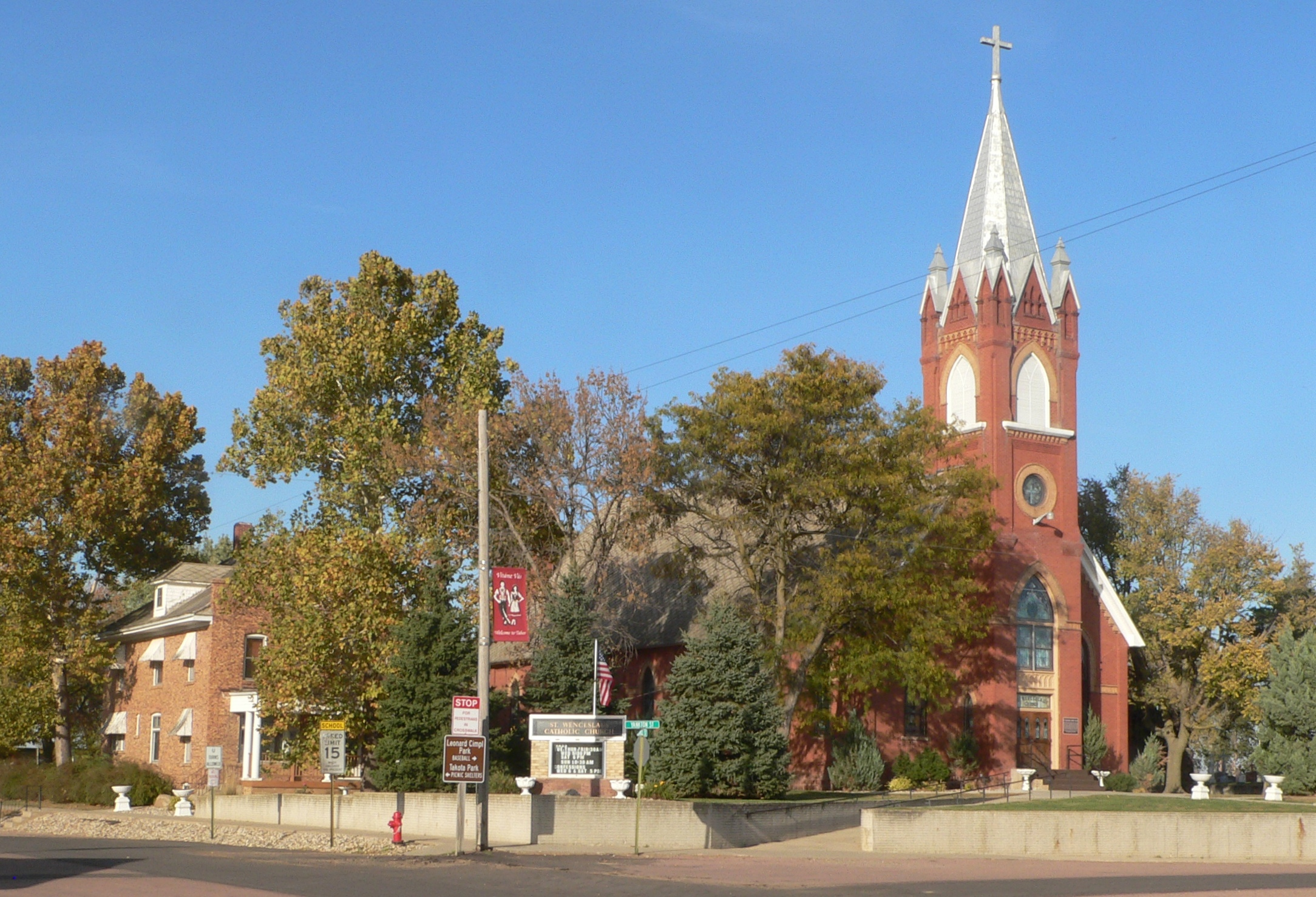

- Location within South Dakota Location within the United States
- Location: Yankton and Lidice Sts., Tabor, South Dakota
- Coordinates: 42.950462°N 97.658516°W
- Area: 2 acres (0.81 ha)
- Built: 1898 (church), 1910 (parish house)
- Built by: August O. Goetz
- Architectural style: Czech folk architecture
- NRHP reference No.: 84000579
- Added to NRHP: December 13, 1984

St. Wenceslaus Parish is a Catholic parish of the Roman Catholic Diocese of Sioux Falls in Tabor, South Dakota in the Midwestern United States. Its historic red brick church, built in 1898, was listed as St. Wenceslaus Catholic Church and Parish House on the National Register of Historic Places on December 13, 1984, as part of a "Thematic Nomination of Czech Folk Architecture of Southeastern South Dakota".

Czech immigrants from Bohemia started arriving in the area, then part of the Dakota Territory, in 1868, and church services were being held by 1871. The first church, of chalk rock, built with donated labor, was completed in 1874. This structure, quickly outgrown, was replaced with the current red brick church in 1898, with the parish house in the similar style built in 1910. The church was built by contractor August Goetz. A brick schoolhouse and dormitory was built in 1903–4. The school moved to a new campus in 1960, but was closed in 1970; the facility is now leased to the Bon Homme School District.

== See also ==
- National Register of Historic Places listings in Bon Homme County, South Dakota
