= South Dakota Highway 52 =

State highway in South Dakota, United States

Highway 52

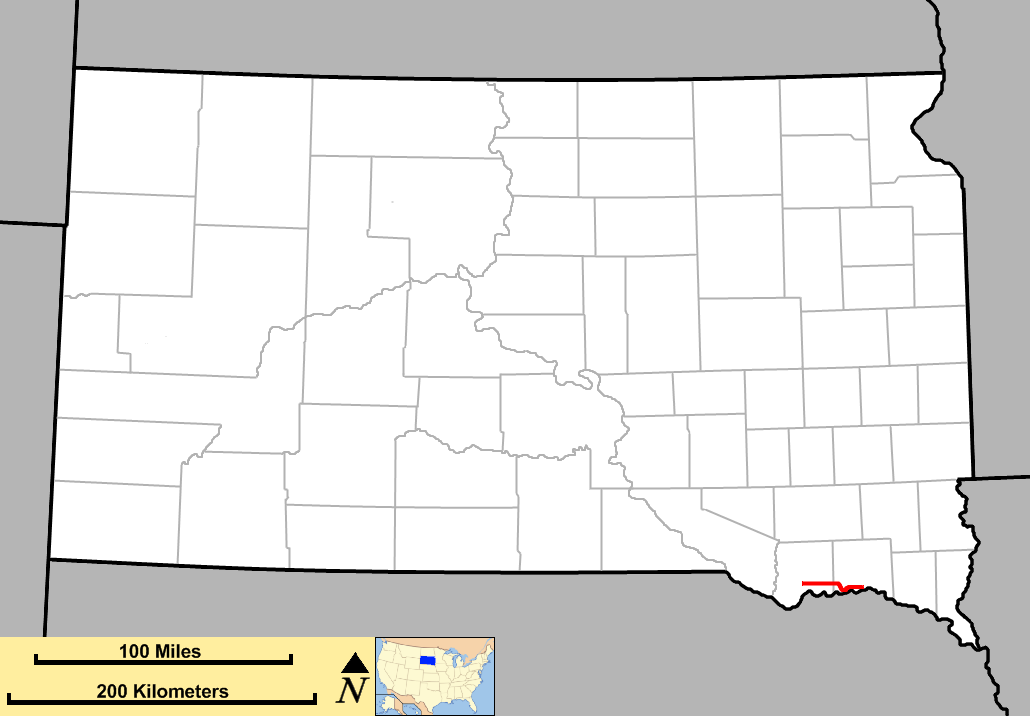
- Route of SD 52 (in red)

Route information
- Maintained by SDDOT
- Length: 28.567 mi (45.974 km)
- Existed: 1955 (approx.)–present
- Tourist routes: Lewis and Clark Trail

Major junctions
- West end: SD 37 north of Springfield
- East end: US 81 / SD 50 in Yankton

Location
- Country: United States
- State: South Dakota
- Counties: Bon Homme, Yankton

Highway system
- South Dakota State Trunk Highway System; Interstate; US; State
← SD 50	→ SD 53

South Dakota Highway 52 (SD 52) is a state route that runs just north of the Missouri River, across southeast South Dakota. It begins at a junction with South Dakota Highway 37 north of Springfield, and terminates in Yankton at U.S. Highway 81, at the junction of 4th and Broadway Streets. It is 37 miles (60 km) in length.

== History ==
This is the third occurrence of the use of South Dakota 52 since 1926.

The first SD 52 was located in the southwest portion of the state, designated in the mid-1920s. It extended from Oelrichs east to Oglala. It was used until 1950, when U.S. Highway 18 was rerouted onto this road.

In the early 1950s, there were two new, separate segments of SD 52. One was in the extreme southwest corner of the state. It began at U.S. 18 in Edgemont, and ran southerly to meet what is now South Dakota Highway 71 near Rumford. This road was renumbered as South Dakota Highway 471 in 1976.

The second 1950's segment of SD 52 was the current alignment.

== Major intersections ==
County	Location	mi	km	Destinations	Notes
Bon Homme	Southwest Bon Homme	0.000	0.000	SD 37 / Lewis and Clark Trail – Tyndall, Springfield, Niobrara NE	
Bon Homme	Southeast Bon Homme	12.269	19.745	SD 50 west – Tyndall	West end of SD 50 concurrency
Yankton	West Yankton	17.192	27.668	SD 50 east / SD 52 Truck – Yankton	East end of SD 50 concurrency
Yankton	West Yankton	23.284	37.472	SD 153 north	
Yankton	Yankton	28.567	45.974	US 81 – Norfolk NE, Freeman; SD 50 / Lewis and Clark Trail – Vermillion	
1.000 mi = 1.609 km; 1.000 km = 0.621 mi: Concurrency terminus
