= Cihak Farmstead =

Historic house in South Dakota, United States

Coordinates: 43°09′20.3″N 97°54′17.6″W

- U.S. National Register of Historic Places
- Location: Address Restricted, Southeastern corner of the southwestern quadrant of Section 2, T69N, R60W, Scotland, South Dakota
- Architectural style: German-Russian folk architecture
- NRHP reference No.: 84001263
- Added to NRHP: November 28, 1984

The Cihak Farmstead is a historic farmstead located in Scotland, South Dakota. It was added to the National Register of Historic Places on November 28, 1984, as part of a nomination of "German-Russian Folk Architecture Thematic Resources" in South Dakota. The farmstead was established by ethnic German immigrants from Russia.

== See also ==
- National Register of Historic Places listings in Bon Homme County, South Dakota
