= Kingsburg, South Dakota =

Unincorporated community in South Dakota, U.S.

Coordinates: 42°54′52″N 97°55′52″W

Kingsburg is an unincorporated community in Bon Homme County, in the U.S. state of South Dakota.

== History ==
Kingsburg was laid out in 1917, and named for Mike King, a local landowner. A post office called Kingsburg was established in 1913, and remained in operation until 1940.
