= Yankton Carnegie Library =

- U.S. National Register of Historic Places
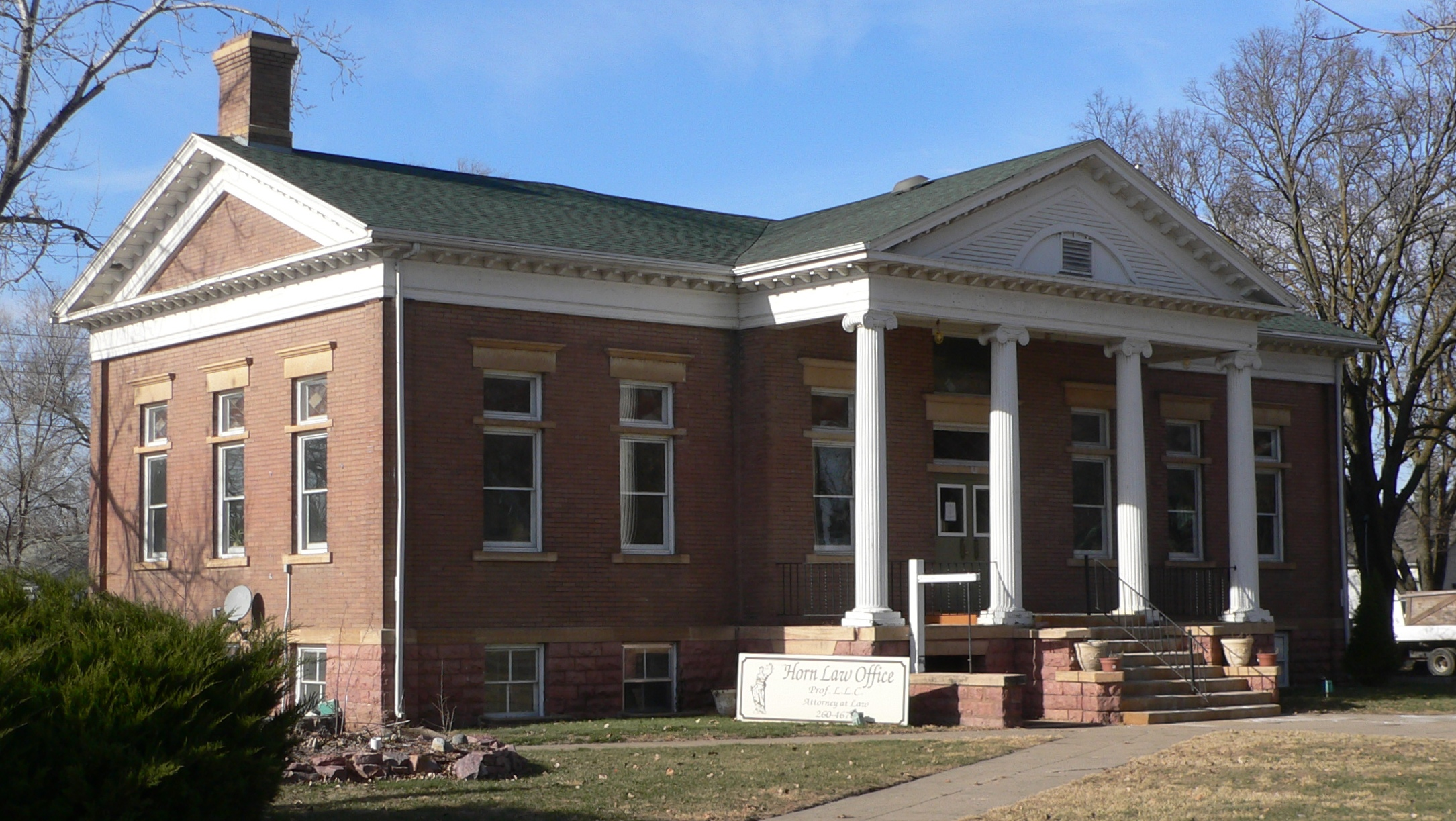
- The library in 2010

- Location within South Dakota Location within the United States
- Location: 4th and Capitol Sts., Yankton, South Dakota
- Coordinates: 42°52′17″N 97°23′26″W
- Area: less than one acre
- Built: 1902-03
- Built by: August Goetz
- Architectural style: Neoclassical
- NRHP reference No.: 79002412
- Added to NRHP: August 7, 1979

The Yankton Carnegie Library is a historic building in Yankton, South Dakota. It was built as a Carnegie library in 1902–03, and is Neoclassical style in style. It was built by German-born contractor August Goetz. It was a public library from 1903 to 1973.

It served as the town's library from 1903 to 1973, and later served as the Lewis and Clark Mental Health Center.

It has been listed on the National Register of Historic Places since August 7, 1979.
