= St. Agnes Catholic Church (Vermillion, South Dakota) =

Historic church in Vermillion, South Dakota, United States

- U.S. National Register of Historic Places
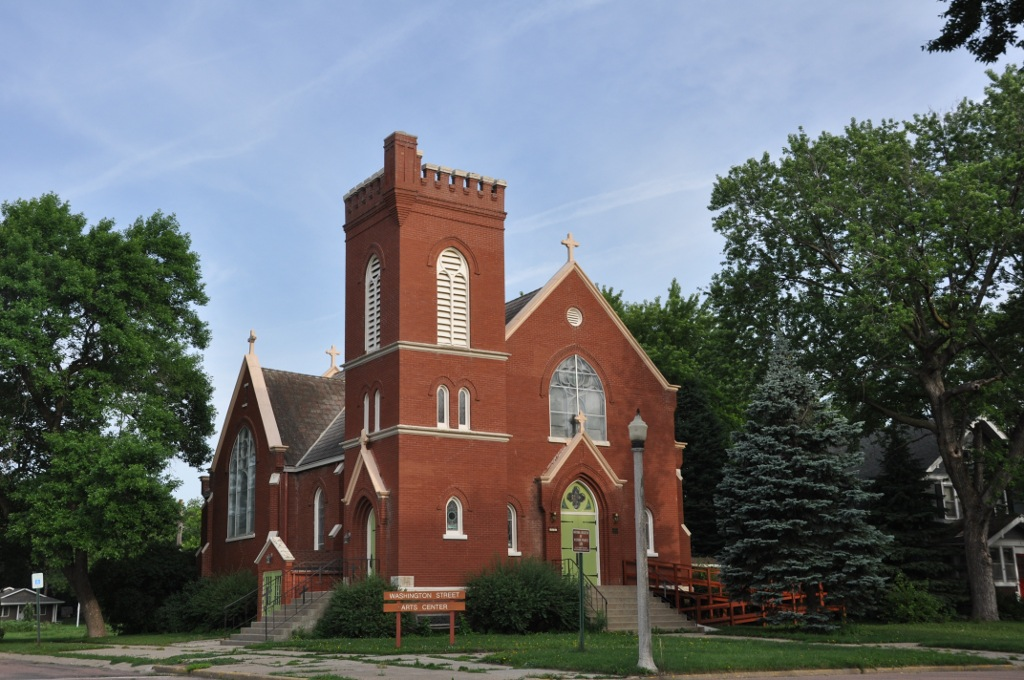

- Location within South Dakota Location within the United States
- Location: 202 Washington St., Vermillion, South Dakota
- Coordinates: 42°46′54″N 96°56′4″W
- Area: less than one acre
- Built: 1906
- Built by: August Goetz
- Architect: Anton Dohmen
- Architectural style: Late Gothic Revival
- NRHP reference No.: 95000280
- Added to NRHP: March 27, 1995

The Washington Street Arts Center is a historic building at 202 Washington Street in Vermillion, South Dakota. It was originally built as the parish church of St. Agnes Catholic Church and was added to the National Register of Historic Places in 1995.

== History ==
The first Catholic church in Vermillion was built in 1885, but was destroyed by a tornado in 1889, replaced with a new structure the following year. By 1900, the community had outgrown that building, and fundraising began for a larger church. Anton Dohmen, a Bavarian immigrant who was architect for many churches in Wisconsin and the Dakotas, designed the new church in the Gothic Revival style. The cornerstone was laid in August 1906, and the new church opened on September 21, 1907. The parish outgrew the church and moved to a new space in 1974, selling the historic church to the Church of the Nazarene, which in turn sold it to the Vermillion Area Arts Council in 1990.

It was built by German-born contractor August Goetz.
