= Mike Durfee State Prison =

Prison in South Dakota, United States

- Interactive map of Mike Durfee State Prison
- Location: Springfield, South Dakota; 42°51′38″N 97°53′58″W
- Status: open
- Security class: Maximum, Medium
- Capacity: 1236 as of 2012
- Opened: 1984

The Mike Durfee State Prison is a South Dakota state prison for men on the campus of what was University of South Dakota at Springfield, United States.

== History ==
It is named for Mike Durfee who was a standout athlete and teacher at the school. It opened under the name of Springfield State Prison in 1984 with women from the prison at Yankton, South Dakota. It became coed in 1985 with males being admitted. It became all male in 1997 when the women were transferred to Herm Solem Public Safety Center in Pierre, South Dakota. In 1999 it was named for Mike Durfee who had been with the school and was Deputy Director of the South Dakota Department of Corrections.

== Notable Inmates ==
Inmate Name	Register Number	Status	Details
Ted Klaudt	14742	Serving a 44 year prison sentenced. Scheduled for release in 2061.	GOP member who was serving in the South Dakota House of Representatives before convicted of raping his two foster daughters.
