= Avon, South Dakota =

- City
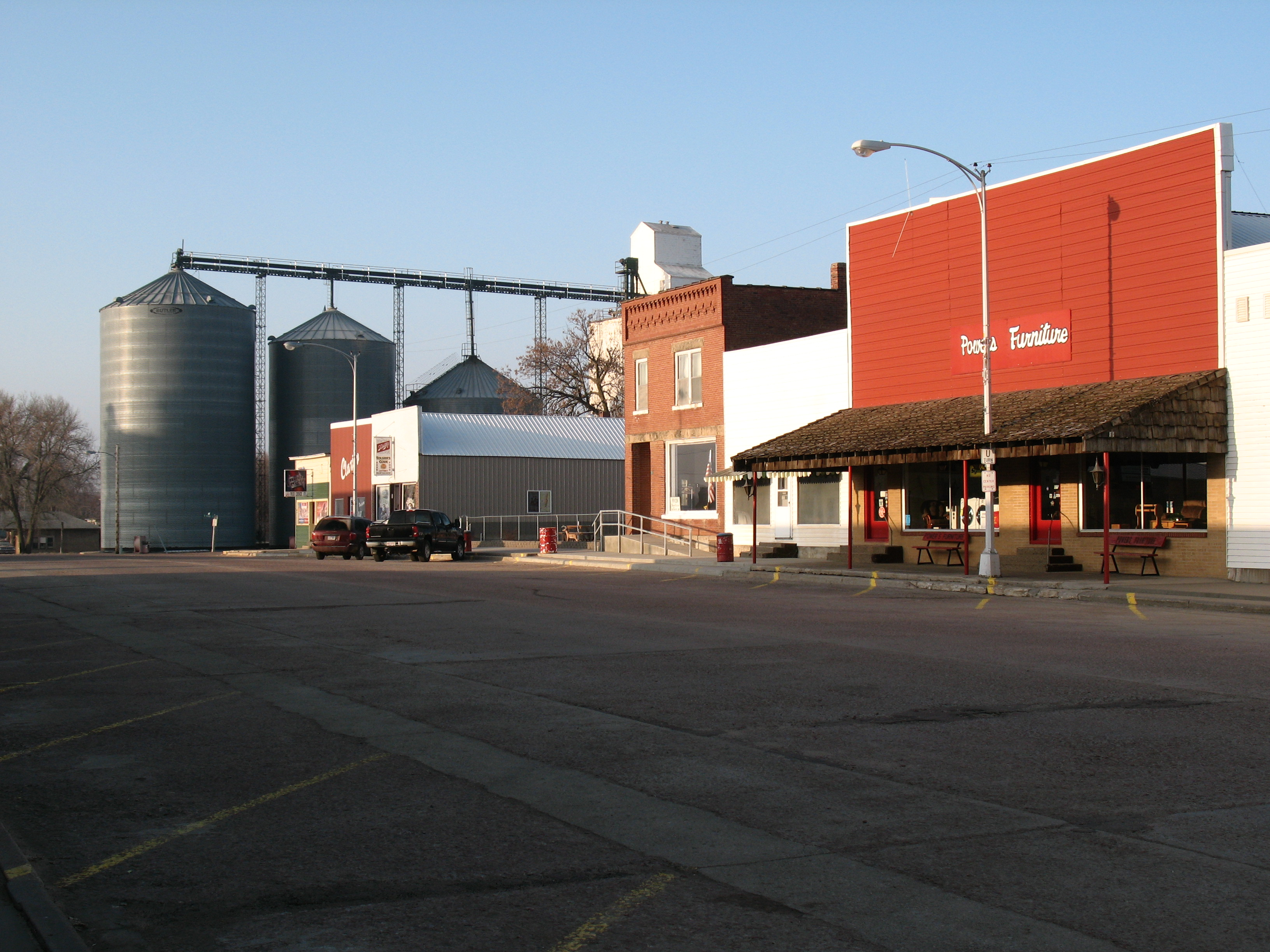
- Main St. in Avon

- Location in Bon Homme County and the state of South Dakota
- Coordinates: 43°00′09″N 98°03′26″W
- Country: United States
- State: South Dakota
- County: Bon Homme
- Established: 1879

Area
  - Total: 0.65 sq mi (1.68 km^{2})
  - Land: 0.65 sq mi (1.68 km^{2})
  - Water: 0 sq mi (0.00 km^{2})
- Elevation: 1,618 ft (493 m)

Population (2020)
  - Total: 586
  - Density: 904.2/sq mi (349.13/km^{2})
- Time zone: UTC-6 (Central (CST))
  - Summer (DST): UTC-5 (CDT)
- ZIP code: 57315
- Area code: 605
- FIPS code: 46-02900
- GNIS feature ID: 1267274
- Website: cityofavon.org

Avon is a city in Bon Homme County, South Dakota, United States. The population was 586 at the 2020 census.

South Dakota senator and 1972 Democratic presidential candidate George McGovern was born and raised in Avon until he was six, when his family moved to Mitchell, South Dakota.

== History ==
Avon was founded in 1879. The community owes its name to Avon, New York, the hometown of an early postmaster. Construction of the railroad prompted the town to move to its current site in 1900.

== Geography ==
Avon is served by South Dakota Highway 50, which runs east–west in the northern part of town.

According to the United States Census Bureau, the city has a total area of 0.64 square miles (1.66 km^{2}), all land.

== Demographics ==
Historical population
Census	Pop.	Note	%±
1910	451		—
1920	630		39.7%
1930	670		6.3%
1940	728		8.7%
1950	692		−4.9%
1960	637		−7.9%
1970	610		−4.2%
1980	576		−5.6%
1990	576		0.0%
2000	561		−2.6%
2010	590		5.2%
2020	586		−0.7%
U.S. Decennial Census

=== 2020 census ===
As of the 2020 census, Avon had a population of 586. The median age was 38.6 years. 27.8% of residents were under the age of 18 and 23.0% of residents were 65 years of age or older. For every 100 females there were 100.0 males, and for every 100 females age 18 and over there were 97.7 males age 18 and over.

0.0% of residents lived in urban areas, while 100.0% lived in rural areas.

There were 233 households in Avon, of which 25.3% had children under the age of 18 living in them. Of all households, 54.1% were married-couple households, 17.2% were households with a male householder and no spouse or partner present, and 23.6% were households with a female householder and no spouse or partner present. About 33.1% of all households were made up of individuals and 21.5% had someone living alone who was 65 years of age or older.

There were 288 housing units, of which 19.1% were vacant. The homeowner vacancy rate was 4.7% and the rental vacancy rate was 21.7%.

Racial composition as of the 2020 census
Race	Number	Percent
White	531	90.6%
Black or African American	3	0.5%
American Indian and Alaska Native	31	5.3%
Asian	0	0.0%
Native Hawaiian and Other Pacific Islander	0	0.0%
Some other race	8	1.4%
Two or more races	13	2.2%
Hispanic or Latino (of any race)	9	1.5%

=== 2010 census ===
As of the census of 2010, there were 590 people, 256 households, and 152 families residing in the city. The population density was 921.9 inhabitants per square mile (355.9/km^{2}). There were 313 housing units at an average density of 489.1 units per square mile (188.8 units/km^{2}). The racial makeup of the city was 94.1% White, 3.1% Native American, 0.2% Asian, 1.0% from other races, and 1.7% from two or more races. Hispanic or Latino of any race were 2.0% of the population.

There were 256 households, of which 28.5% had children under the age of 18 living with them, 52.0% were married couples living together, 5.9% had a female householder with no husband present, 1.6% had a male householder with no wife present, and 40.6% were non-families. 37.9% of all households were made up of individuals, and 22.6% had someone living alone who was 65 years of age or older. The average household size was 2.30 and the average family size was 3.07.

The median age in the city was 39.8 years. 28.3% of residents were under the age of 18; 6.1% were between the ages of 18 and 24; 20.9% were from 25 to 44; 24.6% were from 45 to 64; and 20% were 65 years of age or older. The gender makeup of the city was 47.6% male and 52.4% female.

=== 2000 census ===
As of the census of 2000, there were 561 people, 272 households, and 162 families residing in the city. The population density was 873.2 inhabitants per square mile (337.1/km^{2}). There were 318 housing units at an average density of 495.0 units per square mile (191.1 units/km^{2}). The racial makeup of the city was 97.86% White and 2.14% Native American. Hispanic or Latino of any race were 0.36% of the population.

There were 272 households, out of which 22.8% had children under the age of 18 living with them, 53.7% were married couples living together, 4.8% had a female householder with no husband present, and 40.1% were non-families. 39.0% of all households were made up of individuals, and 28.7% had someone living alone who was 65 years of age or older. The average household size was 2.06 and the average family size was 2.75.

In the city, the population was spread out, with 20.1% under the age of 18, 5.0% from 18 to 24, 21.7% from 25 to 44, 20.3% from 45 to 64, and 32.8% who were 65 years of age or older. The median age was 48 years. For every 100 females, there were 90.8 males. For every 100 females age 18 and over, there were 82.9 males.

The median income for a household in the city was $27,656, and the median income for a family was $35,000. Males had a median income of $27,500 versus $16,607 for females. The per capita income for the city was $16,089. About 8.1% of families and 8.2% of the population were below the poverty line, including 9.9% of those under age 18 and 7.9% of those age 65 or over.

== Education ==
Avon Public Schools are part of the Avon School District. The district has one elementary school, one middle school and one high school. Students attend Avon High School.
