= Bon Homme County, South Dakota =

County in South Dakota, United States

- County
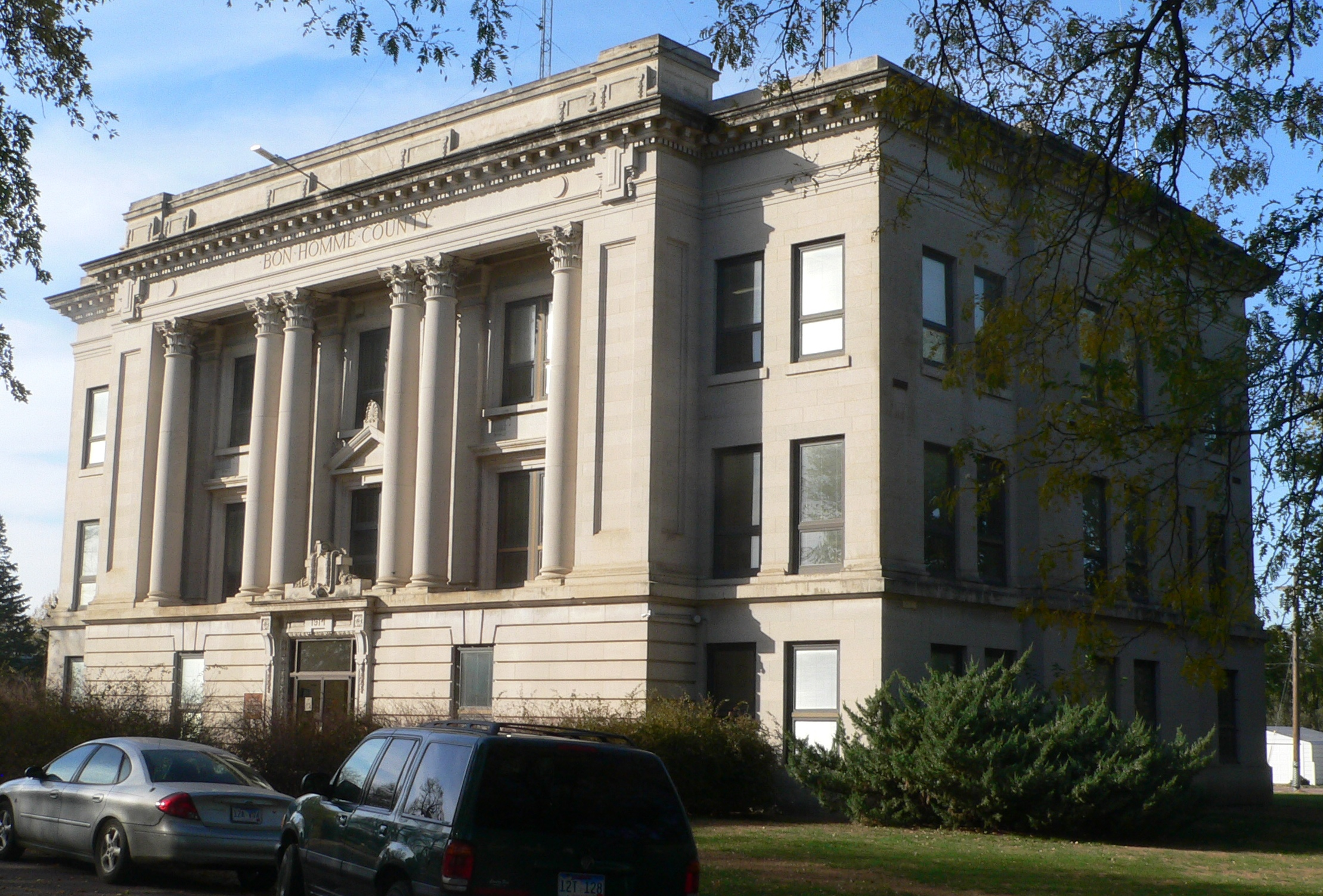
- Bon Homme County Courthouse

- Location within the U.S. state of South Dakota
- Coordinates: 42°59′N 97°53′W
- Country: United States
- State: South Dakota
- Founded: April 5, 1862
- Named for: Bon Homme Island
- Seat: Tyndall
- Largest city: Springfield

Area
  - Total: 582 sq mi (1,510 km^{2})
  - Land: 564 sq mi (1,460 km^{2})
  - Water: 18 sq mi (47 km^{2}) 3.1%

Population (2020)
  - Total: 7,003
  - Estimate (2025): 7,244 ▲
  - Density: 12.8/sq mi (4.9/km^{2})
- Time zone: UTC−6 (Central)
  - Summer (DST): UTC−5 (CDT)
- Congressional district: At-large
- Website: bonhomme.sdcounties.org

Bon Homme County (/ˈbɑːn əm/ BAHN əm; French: Comté de bon homme) is a county in the U.S. state of South Dakota. As of the 2020 census, the population was 7,003. Its county seat is Tyndall.

== History ==
Bon Homme County was created in 1862. "Bon Homme" was first used by Lewis and Clark in 1804 as the name for a 2,000 acre island in the Missouri River. When settlers arrived in the late 1850s they borrowed the name, and when the county was created it was named for the village of Bon Homme. A proposal to change the county name to "Jefferson" in 1865 was rejected. The French word "bonhomme" means "good man." The original island is now submerged under Lewis and Clark Lake. The village of Bon Homme was the original county seat until 1885, when it moved to Tyndall.

Bon Homme County is the point of origin for the Siberian alien, Kali tragus, a type of tumbleweed, first reported here in 1877, probably introduced in a shipment of flax seed from Ukraine.

== Geography ==
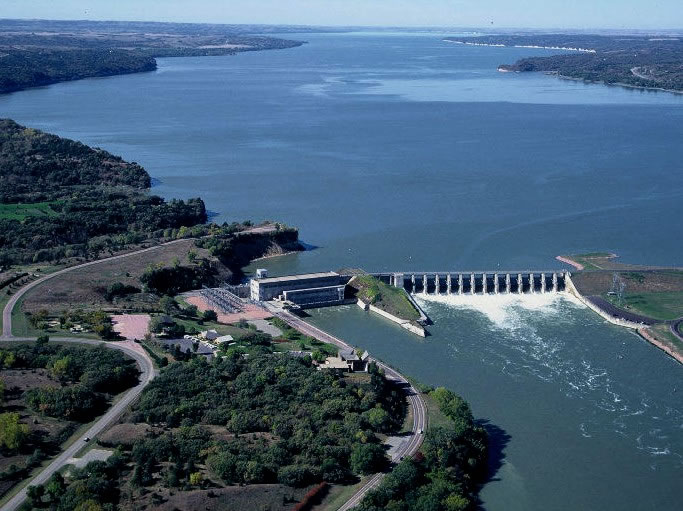
Lewis and Clark Lake on the Missouri River in the southern part of the county

Bon Homme County lies on the south line of South Dakota. Its south boundary line abuts the north boundary line of the state of Nebraska (across the Missouri River). The west boundary line of the county is roughly defined by Choteau Creek, which flows southward to discharge in the river. The county terrain consists of low rolling hills, sloping to the river valley; most of the area is devoted to agriculture. The terrain's highest point is the county's NW corner, at 1,883 ft (574 m) ASL.

The county has a total area of 582 square miles (1,510 km^{2}), of which 564 square miles (1,460 km^{2}) is land and 18 square miles (47 km^{2}) (3.1%) is water.

=== Major highways ===
- South Dakota Highway 25
- South Dakota Highway 37
- South Dakota Highway 46
- South Dakota Highway 50
- South Dakota Highway 52

=== Adjacent counties ===
- Hutchinson County – north
- Yankton County – east
- Knox County, Nebraska – south
- Charles Mix County – west

=== Protected area ===
- Bucholz Waterfowl Production Area
- Charley Creek Unit
- Cosby Waterfowl Production Area
- Missouri National Recreational River (part)
- Sand Creek Recreation Area
- Schaefer Waterfowl Production Area
- Scheffel Waterfowl Production Area
- Snatch Creek Recreation Area
- South Bon Homme State Shooting Area
- Springfield State Recreation Area
- Tabor State Lakeside Use Area

=== Lakes ===
- Lake Henry
- Hruska Lake
- Kloucek Lake
- Lewis and Clark Lake (part)
- Meiers Lake

== Demographics ==
Historical population
Census	Pop.	Note	%±
1870	608		—
1880	5,468		799.3%
1890	9,057		65.6%
1900	10,379		14.6%
1910	11,061		6.6%
1920	11,940		7.9%
1930	11,737		−1.7%
1940	10,241		−12.7%
1950	9,440		−7.8%
1960	9,229		−2.2%
1970	8,577		−7.1%
1980	8,059		−6.0%
1990	7,089		−12.0%
2000	7,260		2.4%
2010	7,070		−2.6%
2020	7,003		−0.9%
2025 (est.)	7,244	▲	3.4%
U.S. Decennial Census

=== 2020 census ===
As of the 2020 census, there were 7,003 people, 2,378 households, and 1,503 families residing in the county. The population density was 12.4 inhabitants per square mile (4.8/km^{2}). There were 2,810 housing units.

Of the residents, 18.5% were under the age of 18 and 21.5% were 65 years of age or older; the median age was 43.1 years. For every 100 females there were 144.9 males, and for every 100 females age 18 and over there were 157.0 males.

The racial makeup of the county was 88.4% White, 1.5% Black or African American, 6.6% American Indian and Alaska Native, 0.2% Asian, 1.0% from some other race, and 2.2% from two or more races. Hispanic or Latino residents of any race comprised 1.7% of the population.

There were 2,378 households, of which 23.3% had children under the age of 18 living with them and 20.3% had a female householder with no spouse or partner present. About 31.8% of all households were made up of individuals and 16.7% had someone living alone who was 65 years of age or older.

There were 2,810 housing units, of which 15.4% were vacant. Among occupied housing units, 80.1% were owner-occupied and 19.9% were renter-occupied. The homeowner vacancy rate was 2.4% and the rental vacancy rate was 13.6%.

=== 2010 census ===
As of the 2010 census, there were 7,070 people, 2,457 households, and 1,572 families in the county. The population density was 12.5 inhabitants per square mile (4.8/km^{2}). There were 2,931 housing units at an average density of 5.2 per square mile (2.0/km^{2}). The racial makeup of the county was 89.8% white, 7.1% American Indian, 1.0% black or African American, 0.1% Asian, 0.6% from other races, and 1.4% from two or more races. Those of Hispanic or Latino origin made up 1.8% of the population. In terms of ancestry, 48.6% were German, 20.6% were Czech, 11.7% were Dutch, 7.8% were Irish, 6.1% were Norwegian, and 1.7% were American.

Of the 2,457 households, 25.6% had children under the age of 18 living with them, 55.7% were married couples living together, 5.5% had a female householder with no husband present, 36.0% were non-families, and 32.8% of all households were made up of individuals. The average household size was 2.24 and the average family size was 2.84. The median age was 43.1 years.

The median income for a household in the county was $41,107 and the median income for a family was $51,910. Males had a median income of $34,478 versus $28,464 for females. The per capita income for the county was $20,074. About 10.1% of families and 12.4% of the population were below the poverty line, including 16.7% of those under age 18 and 12.6% of those age 65 or over.

== Communities ==
=== Cities ===
- Avon
- Scotland
- Springfield
- Tyndall (county seat)

=== Town ===
- Tabor

=== Census-designated place ===
- Bon Homme Colony
- Running Water

=== Unincorporated communities ===
- Kingsburg
- Perkins

== Politics ==
Bon Homme County voters often vote Republican. In only two national elections since 1976 has the county selected the Democratic Party candidate.

United States presidential election results for Bon Homme County, South Dakota
Year	Republican		Democratic		Third party(ies)	
Year	No.	%	No.	%	No.	%
1892	879	49.52%	260	14.65%	636	35.83%
1896	1,163	56.37%	893	43.29%	7	0.34%
1900	1,271	54.93%	1,028	44.43%	15	0.65%
1904	1,547	62.30%	886	35.68%	50	2.01%
1908	1,324	55.26%	1,014	42.32%	58	2.42%
1912	0	0.00%	1,059	44.65%	1,313	55.35%
1916	1,231	47.92%	1,278	49.75%	60	2.34%
1920	1,872	53.23%	960	27.30%	685	19.48%
1924	1,420	41.79%	860	25.31%	1,118	32.90%
1928	2,262	50.93%	2,166	48.77%	13	0.29%
1932	1,354	27.71%	3,504	71.72%	28	0.57%
1936	2,236	42.20%	2,959	55.84%	104	1.96%
1940	3,046	55.29%	2,463	44.71%	0	0.00%
1944	2,553	56.31%	1,981	43.69%	0	0.00%
1948	2,283	51.79%	2,077	47.12%	48	1.09%
1952	3,157	65.57%	1,658	34.43%	0	0.00%
1956	2,696	55.70%	2,144	44.30%	0	0.00%
1960	2,730	57.09%	2,052	42.91%	0	0.00%
1964	1,784	41.70%	2,494	58.30%	0	0.00%
1968	2,411	55.01%	1,773	40.45%	199	4.54%
1972	2,116	47.10%	2,368	52.70%	9	0.20%
1976	1,897	46.58%	2,154	52.88%	22	0.54%
1980	2,794	65.91%	1,191	28.10%	254	5.99%
1984	2,478	63.44%	1,408	36.05%	20	0.51%
1988	1,826	53.44%	1,574	46.06%	17	0.50%
1992	1,212	36.00%	1,294	38.43%	861	25.57%
1996	1,428	41.56%	1,569	45.66%	439	12.78%
2000	1,901	60.56%	1,162	37.02%	76	2.42%
2004	2,063	60.53%	1,293	37.94%	52	1.53%
2008	1,712	53.92%	1,367	43.06%	96	3.02%
2012	1,830	59.53%	1,167	37.96%	77	2.50%
2016	2,105	70.78%	704	23.67%	165	5.55%
2020	2,235	74.48%	721	24.03%	45	1.50%
2024	2,236	74.73%	697	23.30%	59	1.97%

== See also ==
- National Register of Historic Places listings in Bon Homme County, South Dakota
- Lewis and Clark Lake
