= Springfield, South Dakota =

- City
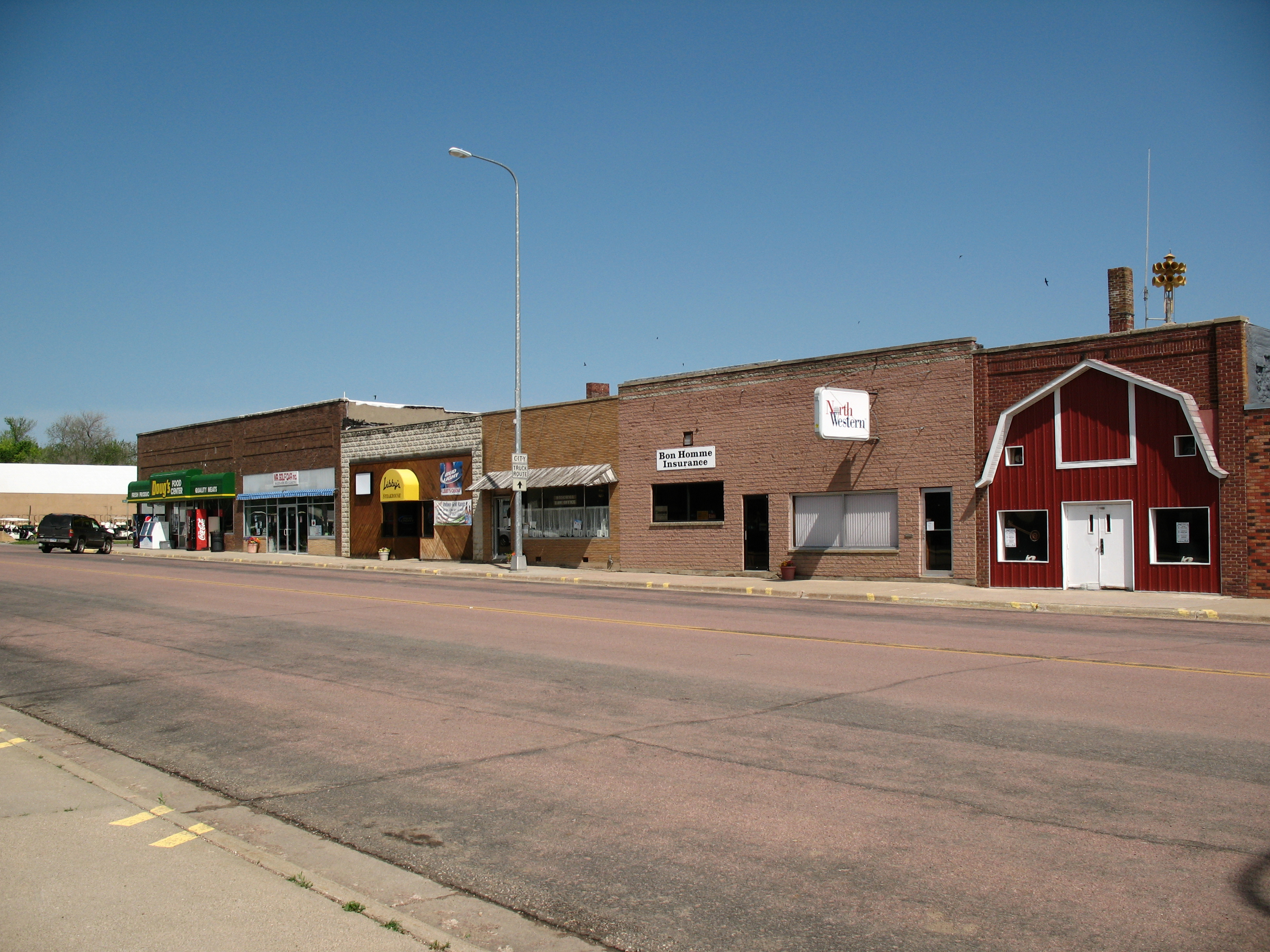
- Main Street (2010)

- Logo

- Location of Springfield, South Dakota
- Coordinates: 42°52′20″N 97°53′52″W
- Country: United States
- State: South Dakota
- County: Bon Homme
- Founded: 1881
- Incorporated: February 21, 1881

Government
  - Mayor: Scott L. Kostal
  - Council President: Katelyn Burch
  - City Council: Stu Cvrk; Cheryl Ludens; Steve Mueller

Area
  - Total: 1.031 sq mi (2.670 km^{2})
  - Land: 1.031 sq mi (2.670 km^{2})
  - Water: 0 sq mi (0.000 km^{2})
- Elevation: 1,289 ft (393 m)

Population (2020)
  - Total: 1,914
  - Density: 1,855.8/sq mi (716.51/km^{2})
- Time zone: UTC–6 (Central (CST))
  - Summer (DST): UTC–5 (CDT)
- ZIP Code: 57062
- Area code: 605
- FIPS code: 46-60660
- GNIS feature ID: 1267590
- Sales tax: 6.2%
- Website: springfieldsd.gov

Springfield is a city in Bon Homme County, South Dakota, United States. The population was 1,914 at the 2020 census, and was estimated to be 1,913 in 2023.

As of Fiscal Year 2024, there were 1,088 male inmates at Mike Durfee State Prison. Springfield was named on account of there being numerous natural springs in the area.

== Geography ==
According to the United States Census Bureau, the city has a total area of 1.031 square miles (2.67 km^{2}), all land.

Springfield is located on the north shore of Lewis and Clark Lake, a 31,000-acre impoundment of the Missouri River.

== Demographics ==
Historical population
Census	Pop.	Note	%±
1880	235		—
1890	302		28.5%
1900	525		73.8%
1910	675		28.6%
1920	719		6.5%
1930	881		22.5%
1940	667		−24.3%
1950	801		20.1%
1960	1,194		49.1%
1970	1,566		31.2%
1980	1,377		−12.1%
1990	834		−39.4%
2000	792		−5.0%
2010	1,989		151.1%
2020	1,914		−3.8%
2023 (est.)	1,913		−0.1%
U.S. Decennial Census; 2020 Census

=== 2020 census ===
As of the 2020 census, Springfield had a population of 1,914. The median age was 39.2 years. 6.8% of residents were under the age of 18 and 13.0% of residents were 65 years of age or older. For every 100 females there were 481.8 males, and for every 100 females age 18 and over there were 557.9 males age 18 and over.

0.0% of residents lived in urban areas, while 100.0% lived in rural areas.

There were 304 households in Springfield, of which 23.7% had children under the age of 18 living in them. Of all households, 48.0% were married-couple households, 22.7% were households with a male householder and no spouse or partner present, and 21.7% were households with a female householder and no spouse or partner present. About 34.2% of all households were made up of individuals and 17.4% had someone living alone who was 65 years of age or older.

There were 382 housing units, of which 20.4% were vacant. The homeowner vacancy rate was 4.5% and the rental vacancy rate was 14.3%.

Racial composition as of the 2020 census
Race	Number	Percent
White	1,304	68.1%
Black or African American	96	5.0%
American Indian and Alaska Native	409	21.4%
Asian	8	0.4%
Native Hawaiian and Other Pacific Islander	2	0.1%
Some other race	46	2.4%
Two or more races	49	2.6%
Hispanic or Latino (of any race)	59	3.1%

=== 2010 census ===
As of the census of 2010, there were 1,989 people, 352 households, and 200 families residing in the city. The population density was 1,969.3 inhabitants per square mile (760.4/km^{2}). There were 433 housing units at an average density of 428.7 per square mile (165.5/km^{2}). The racial makeup of the city was 70.7% White, 2.9% African American, 23.3% Native American, 0.1% Asian, 0.6% from other races, and 2.4% from two or more races. Hispanic or Latino of any race were 3.7% of the population.

There were 352 households, of which 22.7% had children under the age of 18 living with them, 46.9% were married couples living together, 7.4% had a female householder with no husband present, 2.6% had a male householder with no wife present, and 43.2% were non-families. 41.2% of all households were made up of individuals, and 21% had someone living alone who was 65 years of age or older. The average household size was 2.00 and the average family size was 2.66.

The median age in the city was 37 years. 8.8% of residents were under the age of 18; 13.3% were between the ages of 18 and 24; 42.2% were from 25 to 44; 25.1% were from 45 to 64; and 10.6% were 65 years of age or older. The gender makeup of the city was 81.1% male and 18.9% female.

=== 2000 census ===
As of the census of 2000, there were 792 people, 356 households, and 218 families residing in the city. The population density was 1,211.6 inhabitants per square mile (467.8/km^{2}). There were 400 housing units at an average density of 611.9 per square mile (236.3/km^{2}). The racial makeup of the city was 93.43% White, 0.38% African American, 4.80% Native American, and 1.39% from two or more races. Hispanic or Latino of any race were 0.25% of the population.

There were 356 households, out of which 26.4% had children under the age of 18 living with them, 50.6% were married couples living together, 8.4% had a female householder with no husband present, and 38.5% were non-families. 33.1% of all households were made up of individuals, and 14.0% had someone living alone who was 65 years of age or older. The average household size was 2.22 and the average family size was 2.77.

In the city, the population was spread out, with 25.0% under the age of 18, 6.3% from 18 to 24, 22.5% from 25 to 44, 22.9% from 45 to 64, and 23.4% who were 65 years of age or older. The median age was 42 years. For every 100 females, there were 91.3 males. For every 100 females age 18 and over, there were 89.8 males.

As of 2000 the median income for a household in the city was $29,464, and the median income for a family was $40,625. Males had a median income of $25,227 versus $21,071 for females. The per capita income for the city was $15,863. About 8.5% of families and 9.1% of the population were below the poverty line, including 9.2% of those under age 18 and 10.2% of those age 65 or over.

=== Mike Durfee State Prison ===
Springfield is home of the Mike Durfee State Prison. It opened under the name of Springfield State Prison in 1984, and included women from the prison at Yankton. The prison took on its first male inmates in 1985. The prison became all-male in 1997 when the female inmates were transferred to Herm Solem Public Safety Center in Pierre. In 1999, it was renamed for Mike Durfee, who had been Assistant Warden and Director of Education for the prison. Durfee was Deputy Director of the South Dakota Department of Corrections when the prison was renamed in his honor.

The prison currently has approximately 1,250 low to medium security inmates and is a major regional employer.

== Recreation ==
Springfield is a notable destination for recreation including hunting and fishing along the upper portions of Lewis and Clark Lake. The South Dakota Department of Game, Fish, and Parks operates the Springfield State Recreation Area with 20 campsites, boat ramp, and golf course along the lake.

Veteran's Memorial Park (also known by Terrace Park by its locals) sits atop a bluff with scenic views of Lewis and Clark Lake and the Missouri River.

== Notable people ==
- Maria Pearson, Yankton Sioux activist, was born in Springfield
- Mel Tjeerdsma, past president of the American Football Coaches Association, grew up near Springfield

== See also ==
- Lewis and Clark Lake
