= Tyndall, South Dakota =

- City
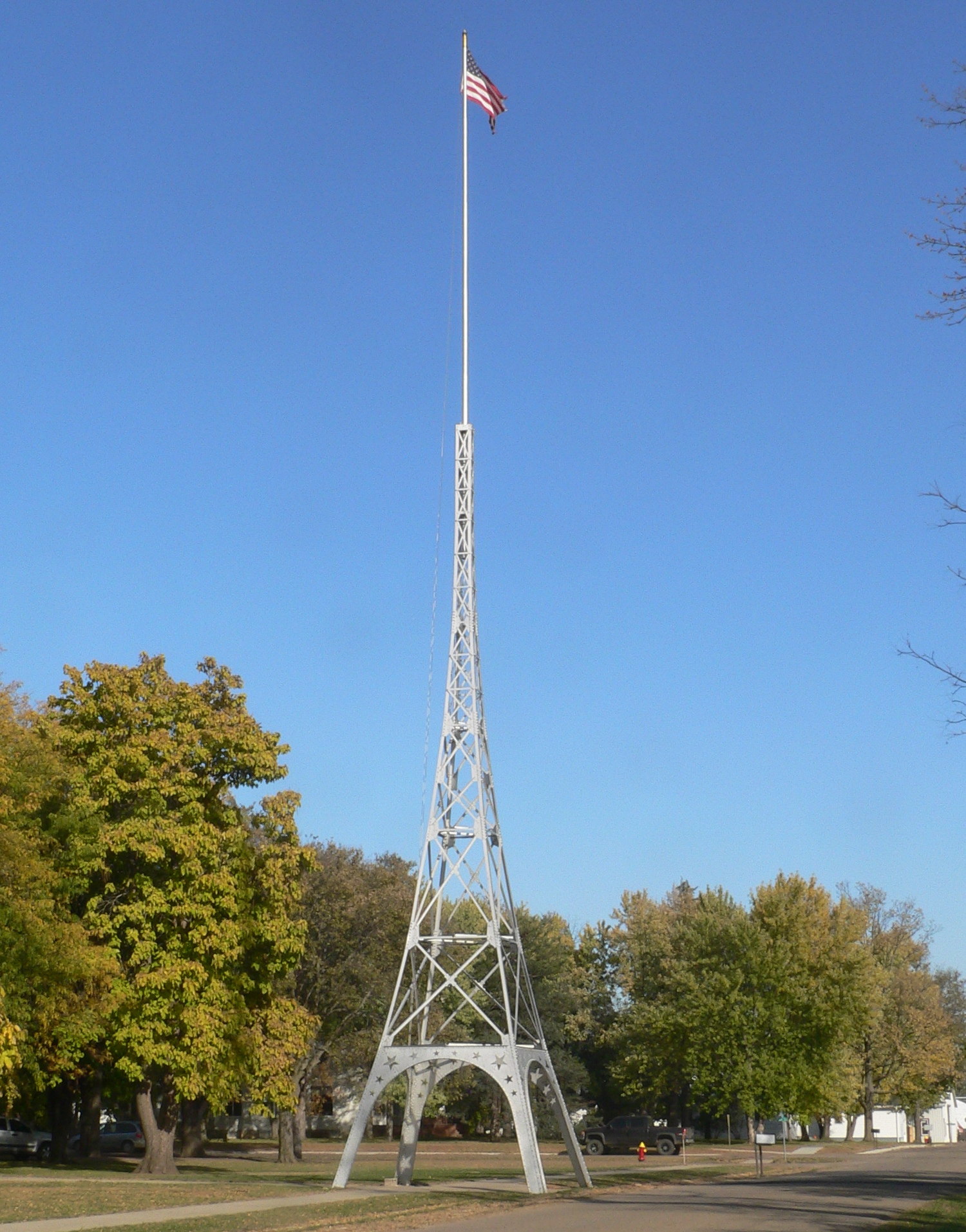
- Flagpole in front of Bon Homme County courthouse

- Location in Bon Homme County and the state of South Dakota
- Coordinates: 42°59′21″N 97°52′15″W
- Country: United States
- State: South Dakota
- County: Bon Homme
- Incorporated: 1887

Area
  - Total: 1.58 sq mi (4.09 km^{2})
  - Land: 1.58 sq mi (4.09 km^{2})
  - Water: 0 sq mi (0.00 km^{2})
- Elevation: 1,414 ft (431 m)

Population (2020)
  - Total: 1,057
  - Density: 669.8/sq mi (258.63/km^{2})
- Time zone: UTC−6 (Central (CST))
  - Summer (DST): UTC−5 (CDT)
- ZIP code: 57066
- Area code: 605
- FIPS code: 46-64860
- GNIS feature ID: 1267608
- Website: tyndallsd.org

Tyndall (pronounced TIN'-duhl) is a city in and the county seat of Bon Homme County, South Dakota, United States. The population was 1,057 at the 2020 census.

== History ==
Tyndall was established in 1879 as the county seat of Bon Homme County. It was named for John Tyndall, an Irish physicist who had paid a visit to the United States.

== Geography ==
South Dakota Highway 50 serves the community and runs east–west on the southern end of town, and South Dakota Highway 37 is located just west of town.

According to the United States Census Bureau, the city has a total area of 1.58 square miles (4.09 km^{2}), all land.

=== Climate ===
Climate data for Tyndall, South Dakota (1991−2020 normals, extremes 1893−present)
Month	Jan	Feb	Mar	Apr	May	Jun	Jul	Aug	Sep	Oct	Nov	Dec	Year
Record high °F (°C)	71 (22)	76 (24)	96 (36)	99 (37)	107 (42)	108 (42)	115 (46)	113 (45)	106 (41)	98 (37)	84 (29)	70 (21)	115 (46)
Mean maximum °F (°C)	53.5 (11.9)	58.9 (14.9)	74.3 (23.5)	83.5 (28.6)	90.1 (32.3)	95.3 (35.2)	98.0 (36.7)	96.4 (35.8)	92.4 (33.6)	85.5 (29.7)	71.5 (21.9)	55.0 (12.8)	99.6 (37.6)
Mean daily maximum °F (°C)	28.9 (−1.7)	34.0 (1.1)	45.9 (7.7)	58.2 (14.6)	69.9 (21.1)	80.6 (27.0)	85.8 (29.9)	83.4 (28.6)	76.1 (24.5)	61.7 (16.5)	45.8 (7.7)	32.7 (0.4)	58.6 (14.8)
Daily mean °F (°C)	18.8 (−7.3)	23.3 (−4.8)	34.5 (1.4)	46.2 (7.9)	58.5 (14.7)	69.4 (20.8)	74.4 (23.6)	71.9 (22.2)	63.4 (17.4)	49.2 (9.6)	34.7 (1.5)	23.1 (−4.9)	47.3 (8.5)
Mean daily minimum °F (°C)	8.7 (−12.9)	12.5 (−10.8)	23.1 (−4.9)	34.3 (1.3)	47.0 (8.3)	58.3 (14.6)	62.9 (17.2)	60.3 (15.7)	50.6 (10.3)	36.7 (2.6)	23.7 (−4.6)	13.5 (−10.3)	36.0 (2.2)
Mean minimum °F (°C)	−11.8 (−24.3)	−7.1 (−21.7)	3.1 (−16.1)	20.5 (−6.4)	33.2 (0.7)	47.2 (8.4)	52.2 (11.2)	50.5 (10.3)	36.3 (2.4)	21.3 (−5.9)	6.5 (−14.2)	−6.5 (−21.4)	−15.9 (−26.6)
Record low °F (°C)	−38 (−39)	−41 (−41)	−19 (−28)	−3 (−19)	20 (−7)	33 (1)	40 (4)	36 (2)	21 (−6)	4 (−16)	−19 (−28)	−36 (−38)	−41 (−41)
Average precipitation inches (mm)	0.57 (14)	0.81 (21)	1.35 (34)	2.86 (73)	3.96 (101)	3.39 (86)	3.33 (85)	3.27 (83)	2.70 (69)	2.21 (56)	1.01 (26)	0.78 (20)	26.24 (666)
Average snowfall inches (cm)	6.5 (17)	7.4 (19)	5.3 (13)	4.1 (10)	0.2 (0.51)	0.0 (0.0)	0.0 (0.0)	0.0 (0.0)	0.0 (0.0)	0.8 (2.0)	5.0 (13)	7.3 (19)	36.6 (93)
Average precipitation days (≥ 0.01 in)	5.4	5.4	6.6	9.0	11.2	10.4	7.7	8.8	7.0	6.9	4.7	5.3	88.4
Average snowy days (≥ 0.1 in)	4.1	3.9	2.8	1.3	0.1	0.0	0.0	0.0	0.0	0.5	1.7	3.7	18.1
Source: NOAA

== Demographics ==
Historical population
Census	Pop.	Note	%±
1890	509		—
1900	1,167		129.3%
1910	1,107		−5.1%
1920	1,405		26.9%
1930	1,287		−8.4%
1940	1,289		0.2%
1950	1,292		0.2%
1960	1,262		−2.3%
1970	1,245		−1.3%
1980	1,253		0.6%
1990	1,201		−4.2%
2000	1,239		3.2%
2010	1,067		−13.9%
2020	1,057		−0.9%
U.S. Decennial Census

=== 2020 census ===
As of the 2020 census, Tyndall had a population of 1,057; the median age was 54.2 years, 19.2% of residents were under the age of 18, and 31.5% of residents were 65 years of age or older. For every 100 females there were 92.2 males, and for every 100 females age 18 and over there were 84.1 males age 18 and over.

0.0% of residents lived in urban areas, while 100.0% lived in rural areas.

There were 468 households in Tyndall, of which 21.2% had children under the age of 18 living in them. Of all households, 44.9% were married-couple households, 17.7% were households with a male householder and no spouse or partner present, and 29.9% were households with a female householder and no spouse or partner present. About 37.1% of all households were made up of individuals and 19.9% had someone living alone who was 65 years of age or older.

There were 508 housing units, of which 7.9% were vacant. The homeowner vacancy rate was 2.2% and the rental vacancy rate was 13.4%.

Racial composition as of the 2020 census
Race	Number	Percent
White	1,013	95.8%
Black or African American	2	0.2%
American Indian and Alaska Native	2	0.2%
Asian	0	0.0%
Native Hawaiian and Other Pacific Islander	1	0.1%
Some other race	9	0.9%
Two or more races	30	2.8%
Hispanic or Latino (of any race)	23	2.2%

=== 2010 census ===
As of the census of 2010, there were 1,067 people, 471 households, and 268 families living in the city. The population density was 675.3 inhabitants per square mile (260.7/km^{2}). There were 531 housing units at an average density of 336.1 per square mile (129.8/km^{2}). The racial makeup of the city was 97.9% White, 0.1% African American, 0.7% Native American, 0.6% from other races, and 0.7% from two or more races. Hispanic or Latino of any race were 1.6% of the population.

There were 471 households, of which 23.8% had children under the age of 18 living with them, 46.3% were married couples living together, 7.9% had a female householder with no husband present, 2.8% had a male householder with no wife present, and 43.1% were non-families. 39.9% of all households were made up of individuals, and 22.5% had someone living alone who was 65 years of age or older. The average household size was 2.12 and the average family size was 2.88.

The median age in the city was 48.2 years. 21.5% of residents were under the age of 18; 4% were between the ages of 18 and 24; 18.7% were from 25 to 44; 27.5% were from 45 to 64; and 28.2% were 65 years of age or older. The gender makeup of the city was 47.7% male and 52.3% female.

=== 2000 census ===
As of the census of 2000, there were 1,239 people, 524 households, and 311 families living in the city. The population density was 783.6 inhabitants per square mile (302.5/km^{2}). There were 579 housing units at an average density of 366.2 per square mile (141.4/km^{2}). The racial makeup of the city was 98.22% White, 0.56% African American, 0.56% Native American, 0.16% from other races, and 0.48% from two or more races. Hispanic or Latino of any race were 0.65% of the population.

There were 524 households, out of which 24.4% had children under the age of 18 living with them, 50.0% were married couples living together, 5.9% had a female householder with no husband present, and 40.5% were non-families. 36.8% of all households were made up of individuals, and 20.8% had someone living alone who was 65 years of age or older. The average household size was 2.22 and the average family size was 2.92.

In the city, the population was spread out, with 22.8% under the age of 18, 4.9% from 18 to 24, 23.1% from 25 to 44, 21.3% from 45 to 64, and 27.8% who were 65 years of age or older. The median age was 44 years. For every 100 females, there were 93.0 males. For every 100 females age 18 and over, there were 89.7 males.

As of 2000 the median income for a household in the city was $28,042, and the median income for a family was $37,500. Males had a median income of $24,219 versus $20,109 for females. The per capita income for the city was $15,086. About 9.6% of families and 17.2% of the population were below the poverty line, including 23.2% of those under age 18 and 21.8% of those age 65 or over.

== Notable people ==
- Raleigh Aitchison – professional baseball pitcher from 1911 to 1915
- Chuck Morrell – college football coach
- Josh Ranek – Canadian Football League player
- Robert Taplett – U.S. Marine Corps officer, recipient of the Navy Cross

== See also ==
- List of cities in South Dakota
