= South Dakota Highway 50 =

State highway in South Dakota, United States

Highway 50

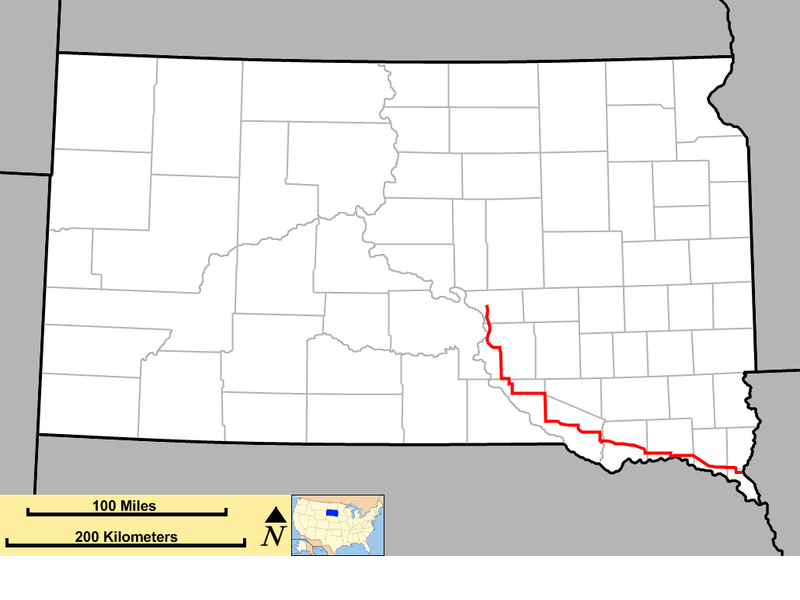
- Route of SD 50 (in red)

Route information
- Maintained by SDDOT
- Length: 212.421 mi (341.858 km)
- Existed: 1926–present
- Tourist routes: Lewis and Clark Trail; Native American Scenic Byway

Major junctions
- West end: SD 34 east of Fort Thompson
- I-90 / I-90 BL in Chamberlain; US 18 / US 281 at Lake Andes; US 81 in Yankton; I-29 near Vermillion
- East end: Iowa 3 near Richland

Location
- Country: United States
- State: South Dakota
- Counties: Buffalo, Brule, Charles Mix, Bon Homme, Yankton, Clay, Union

Highway system
- South Dakota State Trunk Highway System; Interstate; US; State
← SD 49	→ SD 52

South Dakota Highway 50 (SD 50) is a state route serving south central and southeast South Dakota. The current alignment begins at the junction of South Dakota Highway 34 at "Lee's Corner" east of Fort Thompson, and ends at the Iowa border near Richland, where it continues as Iowa Highway 3. It is about 212 miles (341 km) in length.

== History ==
SD 50 was designated on the route known as the Sunshine Highway. When it was formed in the 1920s, it traveled the entire length of southern South Dakota, from the Wyoming state line west of Edgemont, to the Iowa state line at Sioux City.

When U.S. Route 18 (US 18) was designated in the late 1920s, it replaced the SD 50 designation from the Wyoming state line to Ravinia (east of Lake Andes). SD 50 continued in southeast South Dakota.

Around 1940, SD 50 was extended northwest of its former terminus. It assumed a portion of alignment of SD 45 through Geddes, and SD 47 through Academy; the northern terminus became US 16 near Pukwana.

Around 1950, the eastern terminus was rerouted. At US 77 (with which it had previously shared a concurrency to Sioux City), SD 50 was extended east to the Iowa state line.

In 1975, the northwestern terminus was again extended. It was routed west to Chamberlain, then assumed a segment of SD 47 (which had been realigned west) to its new northern terminus at SD 34 east of Fort Thompson.

== Major intersections ==
County	Location	mi	km	Destinations	Notes
Buffalo	Crow Creek	0.000	0.000	SD 34 / Lewis and Clark Trail / Native American Scenic Byway	Western terminus
Brule	Chamberlain	20.145	32.420	I-90 BL west	Western end of BL I-90 concurrency
Brule	Chamberlain	23.331– 23.450	37.548– 37.739	I-90 west / I-90 BL begins / Native American Scenic Byway begins	Eastern terminus of BL I-90, western end of I-90 concurrency, exit 265.
Brule	Red Lake Township	29.642– 30.237	47.704– 48.662	I-90 east	Eastern end of I-90 concurrency, exit 272.
Charles Mix	Castalia	61.986	99.757	SD 44 west	Western end of SD 44 concurrency
Charles Mix	Castalia	64.074	103.117	SD 1804 south	
Charles Mix	Platte	72.070	115.985	SD 45 north	Southern terminus of SD 45
Charles Mix	Darlington–Clark township line	78.999	127.137	SD 44 east	Eastern end of SD 44 concurrency
Charles Mix	Jackson Township	93.827	151.000	SD 1804 south	
Charles Mix	Lake Andes	102.714	165.302	US 18 west / US 281 south / Lewis and Clark Trail	Western end of US 18/US 281 concurrency
Charles Mix	Plain Center–Bryan township line	112.611	181.230	US 18 east / US 281 north	Eastern end of US 18/US 281 concurrency
Charles Mix	Wagner	117.904	189.748	SD 46 west / Lewis and Clark Trail	Western end of SD 46 concurrency
Charles Mix	Lone Tree–Choteau Creek township line	126.743	203.973	SD 46 east	Eastern end of SD 46 concurrency
Bon Homme	Northwest Bon Homme	137.056	220.570	SD 37 north	Western end of SD 37 concurrency
Bon Homme	Southwest Bon Homme	141.175	227.199	SD 37 south / Lewis and Clark Trail	Eastern end of SD 37 concurrency
Bon Homme	Southeast Bon Homme	150.725	242.568	SD 25 north	Southern terminus of SD 25
Bon Homme	Southeast Bon Homme	156.817	252.372	SD 52 west / Lewis and Clark Trail	Western end of SD 52 concurrency
Yankton	West Yankton	161.701	260.233	SD 52 east / Lewis and Clark Trail / SD 52 Truck begins	Eastern end of SD 52 concurrency
Yankton	West Yankton	164.738	265.120	SD 153 south – Gavin's Point Dam, Utica	Northern terminus of SD 153
Yankton	West Yankton	165.322	266.060	SD 314 east	Western terminus of SD 314
Yankton	Yankton	169.768	273.215	US 81 north – Freeman	Northern end of US 81 concurrency
Yankton	Yankton	172.435	277.507	US 81 south / SD 52 west / Lewis and Clark Trail / SD 52 Truck ends – Norfolk, NE	Eastern terminus of SD 52, southern end of US 81 concurrency
Clay	Vermillion Township	194.864	313.603	SD 50 Bus. east – Vermillion Business District, Newcastle, NE	Western terminus of SD 50 Bus.
Clay	Vermillion	196.882	316.851	SD 19 – Vermillion, Newcastle, NE, Centerville	Vermillion only signed eastbound; Newcastle, NE only signed westbound
Clay	Fairview Township	197.238	317.424	SD 50 Bus. west	Eastern terminus of SD 50 Bus.
Union	Brule Township	202.894– 203.069	326.526– 326.808	I-29 – Elk Point, Beresford	I-29 Exit 26.
Union	Brule Township	209.632	337.370	SD 11 south – Elk Point	Northern terminus of southern segment of SD 11
Plymouth	Richland Township	212.421	341.858	Iowa 3 east	Continuation into Iowa
1.000 mi = 1.609 km; 1.000 km = 0.621 mi: Concurrency terminus
