= Tabor, South Dakota =

- City
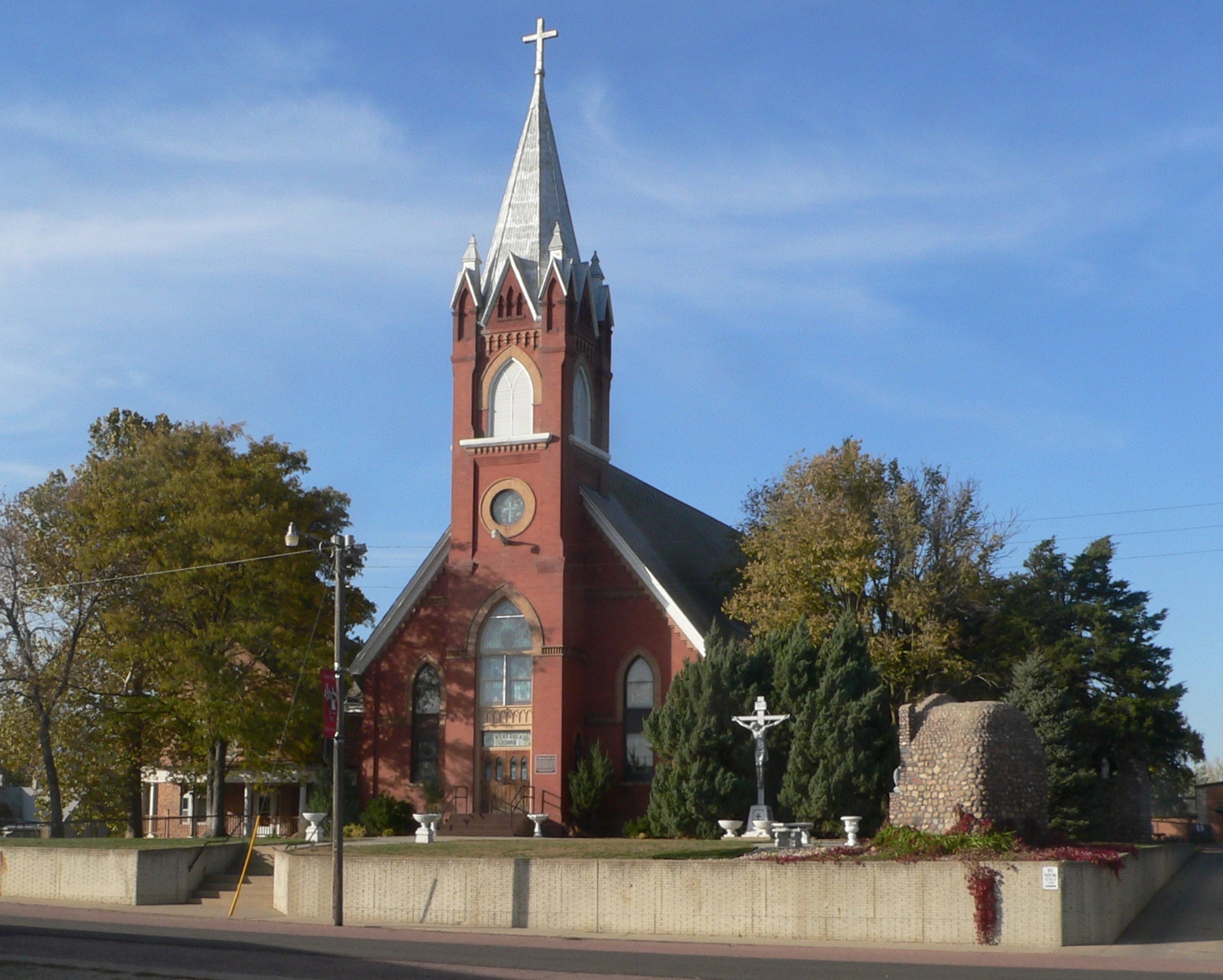
- St. Wenceslaus Church, October 2015

- Location in Bon Homme County and the state of South Dakota
- Coordinates: 42°56′52″N 97°39′34″W
- Country: United States
- State: South Dakota
- County: Bon Homme
- Incorporated: 1888

Area
  - Total: 0.38 sq mi (0.98 km^{2})
  - Land: 0.38 sq mi (0.98 km^{2})
  - Water: 0 sq mi (0.00 km^{2})
- Elevation: 1,352 ft (412 m)

Population (2020)
  - Total: 407
  - Density: 1,074.3/sq mi (414.79/km^{2})
- Time zone: UTC-6 (Central (CST))
  - Summer (DST): UTC-5 (CDT)
- ZIP code: 57063
- Area code: 605
- FIPS code: 46-62820
- GNIS feature ID: 1267598
- Website: www.taborsd.city

Tabor (pronounced "TAY'-bur") is a city in Bon Homme County, South Dakota, United States. The population was 407 at the 2020 census.

== History ==
The town is named after the town of Tábor in the Czech Republic, the native land of a large share of the early settlers.

== Geography ==
Tabor is served by South Dakota Highway 50 on the southern end of town.

According to the United States Census Bureau, the town has a total area of 0.37 square miles (0.96 km^{2}), all land.

== Demographics ==
Historical population
| Census | Pop. | Note | %± |
|---|---|---|---|
| 1910 | 273 | | — |
| 1920 | 428 | | 56.8% |
| 1930 | 397 | | −7.2% |
| 1940 | 391 | | −1.5% |
| 1950 | 373 | | −4.6% |
| 1960 | 378 | | 1.3% |
| 1970 | 388 | | 2.6% |
| 1980 | 460 | | 18.6% |
| 1990 | 403 | | −12.4% |
| 2000 | 417 | | 3.5% |
| 2010 | 423 | | 1.4% |
| 2020 | 407 | | −3.8% |
U.S. Decennial Census

=== 2010 census ===
As of the census of 2010, there were 423 people, 172 households, and 115 families living in the town. The population density was 1,143.2 inhabitants per square mile (441.4/km^{2}). There were 199 housing units at an average density of 537.8 per square mile (207.6/km^{2}). The racial makeup of the town was 94.8% White, 0.2% Asian, 3.1% from other races, and 1.9% from two or more races. Hispanic or Latino of any race were 3.5% of the population.

There were 172 households, of which 31.4% had children under the age of 18 living with them, 58.1% were married couples living together, 5.2% had a female householder with no husband present, 3.5% had a male householder with no wife present, and 33.1% were non-families. 29.7% of all households were made up of individuals, and 12.2% had someone living alone who was 65 years of age or older. The average household size was 2.46 and the average family size was 3.04.

The median age in the town was 41.4 years. 29.3% of residents were under the age of 18; 3.7% were between the ages of 18 and 24; 22% were from 25 to 44; 24.3% were from 45 to 64; and 20.6% were 65 years of age or older. The gender makeup of the town was 49.2% male and 50.8% female.

=== 2000 census ===
As of the census of 2000, there were 417 people, 188 households, and 124 families living in the town. The population density was 1,147.4 people per square mile (443.0 people/km^{2}). There were 201 housing units at an average density of 553.1 per square mile (213.6/km^{2}). The racial makeup of the town was 99.52% White, and 0.48% from two or more races.

There were 188 households, out of which 25.0% had children under the age of 18 living with them, 61.7% were married couples living together, 2.7% had a female householder with no husband present, and 34.0% were non-families. 31.9% of all households were made up of individuals, and 18.1% had someone living alone who was 65 years of age or older. The average household size was 2.22 and the average family size was 2.81.

In the town, the population was spread out, with 23.3% under the age of 18, 4.8% from 18 to 24, 26.9% from 25 to 44, 22.5% from 45 to 64, and 22.5% who were 65 years of age or older. The median age was 42 years. For every 100 females, there were 88.7 males. For every 100 females age 18 and over, there were 87.1 males.

The median income for a household in the town was $30,694, and the median income for a family was $40,893. Males had a median income of $23,438 versus $22,083 for females. The per capita income for the town was $15,885. About 1.5% of families and 6.5% of the population were below the poverty line, including 4.4% of those under age 18 and 19.1% of those age 65 or over.

== Notable people ==
- Chris Karr, businessman and member of the South Dakota House of Representatives
- Lou Koupal, baseball player

== See also ==
- List of towns in South Dakota
