= Vermillion, South Dakota =

Vermillion Waséoyuze
- City
- Vermillion, South Dakota
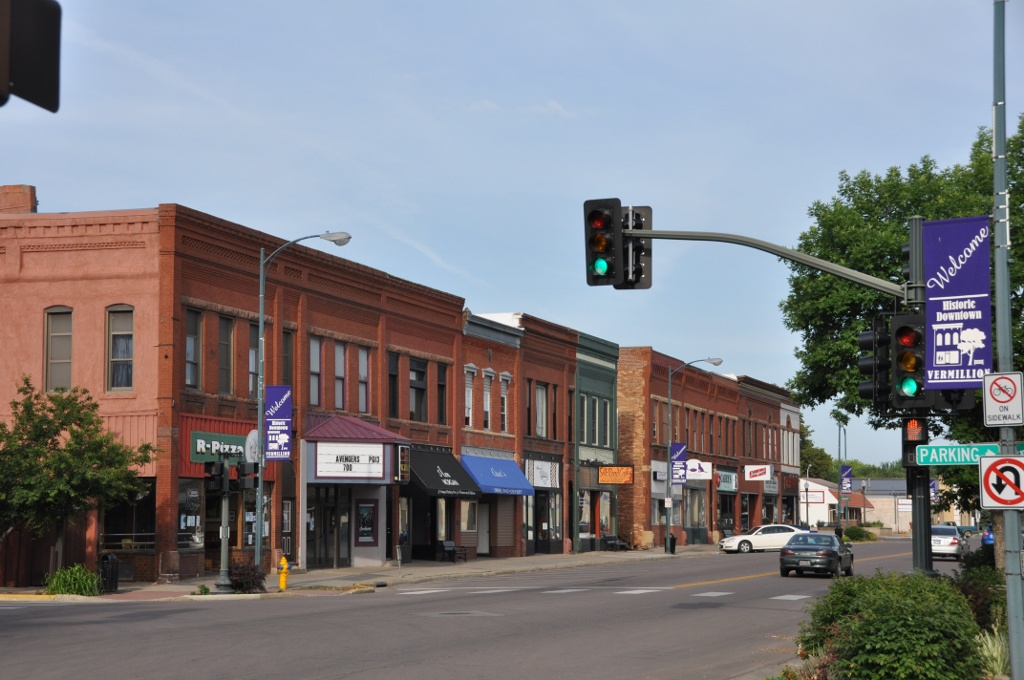
- Downtown Vermillion

- Flag
- Nickname: Otto's Domain
- Location in Clay County and the state of South Dakota
- Coordinates: 42°46′53″N 96°55′31″W
- Country: United States
- State: South Dakota
- County: Clay
- Incorporated: 1877

Government
  - Type: Council–manager
  - Mayor: Jon Cole

Area
  - Total: 4.66 sq mi (12.07 km^{2})
  - Land: 4.66 sq mi (12.07 km^{2})
  - Water: 0 sq mi (0.00 km^{2})
- Elevation: 1,234 ft (376 m)

Population (2020)
  - Total: 11,695
  - Density: 2,509.1/sq mi (968.76/km^{2})
- Time zone: UTC−6 (Central (CST))
  - Summer (DST): UTC−5 (CDT)
- ZIP code: 57069
- Area code: 605
- FIPS code: 46-66700
- GNIS feature ID: 1267613
- Website: www.vermillion.us

Vermillion (Lakota: Waséoyuze; "The Place Where Vermilion is Obtained") is a city in and the county seat of Clay County. It is in the southeastern corner of South Dakota, United States, and is the state's 12th-most populous city. According to the 2020 census, the population was 11,695. The city lies atop a bluff near the Missouri River.

The area has been home to Native American tribes for centuries. French fur traders first visited in the late 18th century. Vermillion was founded in 1859 and incorporated in 1873. The name refers to the Lakota name: wa sa wak pa'la (red stream). Home to the University of South Dakota, Vermillion has a mixed academic and rural character: the university is a major academic institution for the state, with its only law and medical schools and its only AACSB-accredited business school. Major farm products include corn, soybeans, and alfalfa.

== History ==
The area has been home to Native American tribes for centuries. In the late 1700s, the Sioux nations were driven from Minnesota to Dakota, and the Yankton Sioux cultivated corn and stored supplies near where Vermillion would be founded.

French fur traders came to the site in the late 18th century. Lewis and Clark camped at the mouth of the Vermillion River near the present-day town on August 24, 1804. The previous day, they had killed their first bison; the next day, they climbed Spirit Mound. By the 1820s the Missouri River had become a key route for fur traders and the Columbia Fur Company built a post near where the Vermillion River met the Missouri River's old channel just south of the bluffs. In May 1843, John James Audubon visited the Vermillion ravine to view the bird life.

The town of Vermillion was founded in 1859 soon after a treaty with the Yankton Sioux allowed settlement in the southeast Dakota Territory west of the Big Sioux river. The first schoolhouse in the Dakota Territory was built in Vermillion in 1860. In 1862, Vermillion residents lobbied to move the capital of the Dakota territories from Yankton to Vermillion, but instead the territorial legislature promised to put the territorial university there, though they did not provide the necessary funding. Over the next few years, Vermillion became the county seat of Clay County, was made headquarters of First Judicial District of the Dakota Territory, and was given a federal land office. By 1870, Clay County's population had grown to 2,621, and Vermillion was formally incorporated in 1873. The town was considered for the site of South Dakota's first mental institution (now the Human Services Center) in 1873, but the hospital was eventually awarded to nearby Yankton.

In the 1870s, Vermillion's commerce was buoyed by military roads connecting Sioux City with Fort Randall including bridges crossing the Big Sioux, Vermillion, and James rivers, a telegraph line in 1870, a railroad stop for the Dakota Southern Railroad in 1872, wagon trains for the Black Hills Gold Rush, and a shift in the main channel of the Missouri River to the Dakota side in 1878.

The original town was entirely below the bluffs on the banks of the Missouri River, and March and April of 1881, melting snow and ice after the Hard Winter of 1880-81 triggered the Great Flood of 1881, which washed away most of the town.

The flood transformed Vermillion in three ways. First, within a few weeks the residents voted to rebuild the town on top of the bluff. Second, the flooding shifted the Missouri river's flow to be several miles south of the town, reducing commerce from river traffic. Third, to help the town recover, the Dakota Territory legislature finally appropriated funding to construct the University of Dakota so it could begin classes in 1882.

William Jennings Bryan and William Howard Taft—candidates for the U.S. presidency in the 1908 election—spoke in Vermillion on September 28 and 29, 1908, respectively. Along with Eugene Chafin, they toured South Dakota by train, including stops in Mitchell, Tripp, Yankton, and Elk Point.

John Philip Sousa conducted the Sousa Band on October 26, 1926, at the facility that in 1929 became known as Slagle Auditorium.

== Geography ==
According to the United States Census Bureau, the city has an area of 4.03 square miles (10.44 km^{2}), all land. The elevation of the city is 1,221 feet (372 m).

=== Climate ===
Climate data for Vermillion, South Dakota (1991−2020 normals, extremes 1893−present)
Month	Jan	Feb	Mar	Apr	May	Jun	Jul	Aug	Sep	Oct	Nov	Dec	Year
Record high °F (°C)	74 (23)	79 (26)	97 (36)	99 (37)	106 (41)	108 (42)	114 (46)	112 (44)	106 (41)	98 (37)	83 (28)	69 (21)	114 (46)
Mean maximum °F (°C)	52.8 (11.6)	58.0 (14.4)	73.8 (23.2)	84.9 (29.4)	90.6 (32.6)	95.5 (35.3)	95.9 (35.5)	94.1 (34.5)	91.4 (33.0)	86.2 (30.1)	70.6 (21.4)	54.3 (12.4)	98.1 (36.7)
Mean daily maximum °F (°C)	30.5 (−0.8)	36.1 (2.3)	48.4 (9.1)	61.9 (16.6)	72.7 (22.6)	82.2 (27.9)	85.5 (29.7)	83.3 (28.5)	78.1 (25.6)	64.6 (18.1)	48.2 (9.0)	34.0 (1.1)	60.5 (15.8)
Daily mean °F (°C)	20.4 (−6.4)	25.0 (−3.9)	36.8 (2.7)	48.9 (9.4)	60.4 (15.8)	70.7 (21.5)	74.4 (23.6)	72.0 (22.2)	64.9 (18.3)	51.6 (10.9)	36.7 (2.6)	24.3 (−4.3)	48.8 (9.3)
Mean daily minimum °F (°C)	10.2 (−12.1)	14.0 (−10.0)	25.2 (−3.8)	36.0 (2.2)	48.1 (8.9)	59.1 (15.1)	63.2 (17.3)	60.7 (15.9)	51.8 (11.0)	38.5 (3.6)	25.2 (−3.8)	14.6 (−9.7)	37.2 (2.9)
Mean minimum °F (°C)	−15.1 (−26.2)	−9.2 (−22.9)	0.7 (−17.4)	18.7 (−7.4)	32.0 (0.0)	45.9 (7.7)	50.0 (10.0)	48.4 (9.1)	33.7 (0.9)	19.9 (−6.7)	4.7 (−15.2)	−9.1 (−22.8)	−19.4 (−28.6)
Record low °F (°C)	−38 (−39)	−33 (−36)	−30 (−34)	1 (−17)	19 (−7)	36 (2)	37 (3)	34 (1)	23 (−5)	3 (−16)	−24 (−31)	−32 (−36)	−38 (−39)
Average precipitation inches (mm)	0.53 (13)	0.70 (18)	1.42 (36)	3.09 (78)	3.96 (101)	4.30 (109)	3.61 (92)	2.88 (73)	3.07 (78)	2.35 (60)	1.30 (33)	0.79 (20)	28.00 (711)
Average snowfall inches (cm)	6.3 (16)	8.0 (20)	4.3 (11)	2.5 (6.4)	0.0 (0.0)	0.0 (0.0)	0.0 (0.0)	0.0 (0.0)	0.0 (0.0)	0.7 (1.8)	4.2 (11)	6.7 (17)	32.7 (83.2)
Average precipitation days (≥ 0.01 in)	4.2	4.4	5.3	8.1	10.2	9.1	7.2	7.1	6.1	6.8	4.4	4.5	77.4
Average snowy days (≥ 0.1 in)	3.3	3.5	1.9	1.0	0.0	0.0	0.0	0.0	0.0	0.6	1.6	3.1	15.0
Source: NOAA

== Government ==
Vermillion operates under the council-manager form of government. Its governing body has nine members. Eight City Council members are elected from four wards, with two members representing each ward. The Mayor is elected at-large and presides over City Council meetings. The mayor may vote on all matters coming before the governing body. With the consent of the City Council, the mayor appoints individuals to serve on the Library Board and Planning Commission. The Library Board oversees the operations of the Vermillion Public Library and appoints a Library Director. All services and programs provided by the library are overseen by the board. The Planning Commission is charged with overseeing the long-range planning of the community, including zoning issues, subdivisions and formulation of the Comprehensive Plan. The Planning Commission serves a vital role in recommending major policy changes to the governing body for the development of the community.

== Demographics ==
Historical population
Census	Pop.	Note	%±
1880	714		—
1890	1,496		109.5%
1900	2,188		46.3%
1910	2,187		0.0%
1920	2,590		18.4%
1930	2,850		10.0%
1940	3,324		16.6%
1950	5,337		60.6%
1960	6,102		14.3%
1970	9,128		49.6%
1980	10,136		11.0%
1990	10,034		−1.0%
2000	9,765		−2.7%
2010	10,571		8.3%
2020	11,695		10.6%
U.S. Decennial Census

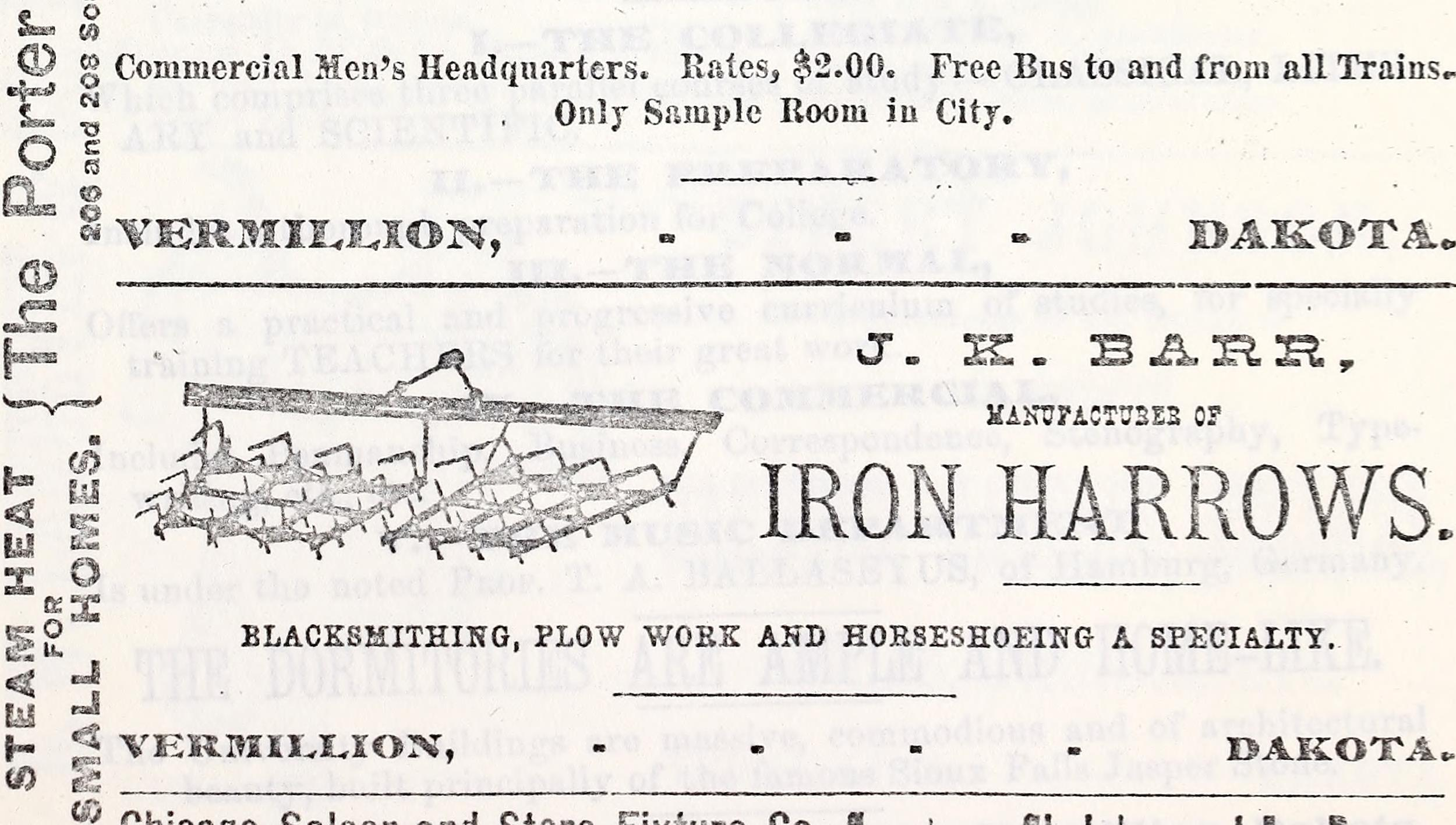
1888 advertisement

=== 2020 census ===
As of the 2020 census, Vermillion had a population of 11,695, with 4,226 households (including 1,771 families) residing in the city. The population density was 2,623.1 inhabitants per square mile (1,012.8/km^{2}), and there were 4,631 housing units.

Of the households, 22.1% had children under the age of 18 living in them, 31.6% were married-couple households, 27.0% had a male householder with no spouse or partner present, 33.0% had a female householder with no spouse or partner present, 38.1% were composed of individuals, and 9.9% had someone living alone who was 65 years of age or older. The average household size was 2.21 and the average family size was 2.90.

There were 4,631 housing units, of which 8.7% were vacant. The homeowner vacancy rate was 2.0% and the rental vacancy rate was 8.1%.

The median age was 23.0 years; 15.9% of residents were under the age of 18, 41.1% were between the ages of 18 and 24, 20.7% were from 25 to 44, 14.4% were from 45 to 64, and 10.4% were 65 years of age or older. For every 100 females there were 86.0 males, and for every 100 females age 18 and over there were 82.2 males.

99.7% of residents lived in urban areas, while 0.3% lived in rural areas.

Racial composition as of the 2020 census
Race	Number	Percent
White	9,694	82.9%
Black or African American	229	2.0%
American Indian and Alaska Native	571	4.9%
Asian	351	3.0%
Native Hawaiian and Other Pacific Islander	3	0.0%
Some other race	151	1.3%
Two or more races	696	6.0%
Hispanic or Latino (of any race)	428	3.7%

=== 2000 census ===
As of the census of 2000, there were 9,765 people, 3,647 households, and 1,801 families residing in the city. The population density was 2,549.3 inhabitants per square mile (984.3/km^{2}). There were 3,967 housing units at an average density of 1,035.6 per square mile (399.8/km^{2}). The racial makeup of the city was 90.95% White, 1.29% African American, 3.37% Native American, 2.46% Asian, 0.01% Pacific Islander, 0.37% from other races, and 1.56% from two or more races. 1.07% of the population were Hispanic or Latino of any race.

There were 3,647 households, out of which 25.8% had children under the age of 18 living with them, 37.5% were married couples living together, 9.2% had a female householder with no husband present, and 50.6% were non-families. 34.1% of all households were made up of individuals, and 7.8% had someone living alone who was 65 years of age or older. The average household size was 2.24 and the average family size was 2.90.

In the city, the population was spread out, with 17.5% under the age of 18, 36.2% from 18 to 24, 24.5% from 25 to 44, 13.4% from 45 to 64, and 8.4% who were 65 years of age or older. The median age was 24 years. For every 100 females, there were 91.6 males. For every 100 females age 18 and over, there were 89.9 males.

As of 2000 the median income for a household in the city was $24,095, and the median income for a family was $40,109. Males had a median income of $28,180 versus $20,975 for females. The per capita income for the city was $13,909. 26.2% of the population and 16.2% of families were below the poverty line. Out of the total people living in poverty, 19.0% are under the age of 18 and 14.8% are 65 or older.

For the population 25 years and over, 90.7% have a high school education or higher; 45.4% have a bachelor's degree or higher; and 21.2% have a graduate or professional degree.

For ancestries, 36% claim German ancestry; 14.2% Norwegian; 13.4% Irish; 6.6% English; 5.5% Dutch; and 4% Swedish.

== Major employers ==
Company	Employees (est.)	Location
Dakota Care Center of Vermillion	90	125 S Walker St
Cafe Brule	70	24 W. Main St
Eagle Creek Software Services	50	1215 W. Cherry St
Hy-Vee	135	525 W Cherry St
Polaris Industries	120	1997 Polaris Pkwy
Sanford Health Network	233	20 S Plum St
Sesdac Inc	130	1314 E Cherry St
South Dakota Department of Military & Veterans Affairs	96	PO Box B434
University of South Dakota	800	414 E Clark St
Vermillion City	157	25 Center St
Vermillion School District 13-1	170	17 Prospect St
Walmart	100	1207 Princeton St

== Parks ==
Vermillion's nine parks, totaling 91 acres (37 ha), include several major city parks: Prentis Park, Cotton Park, Barstow Park, and Lions Park. Lions Park offers camping. Prentis Park includes a new swimming pool opened in 2017, with a waterslide, diving board, shallow play area, "lazy river", and snack bar. The park also features a disc golf course and a baseball diamond which was the home of the Vermillion Grey Sox, of the South Dakota Amateur Baseball Association. The baseball field is currently home of the Vermillion High School, Post 1 American Legion, University of South Dakota club, and VFW teams. The city owns and operates The Bluffs Golf Course, an 18-hole championship golf course that overlooks the river bluffs. Vermillion also offers a bike trail along the Vermillion River and several neighborhood parks: Bliss Park, JC Park, Ty Park, Bluffs Park, and Rotary Park.

== Museums ==
The University of South Dakota's National Music Museum (NMM) is accredited by the American Alliance of Museums in Washington, D.C., and is recognized as "A Landmark of American Music" by the National Music Council. It includes more than 15,000 American, European, and non-Western instruments. The W.H. Over Museum was founded in 1883 and is South Dakota's oldest natural and cultural history museum. Its collections include fossils, botanical and biological specimens, and cultural items related to the history of inhabitants of South Dakota and the Upper Northern Plains. The Austin–Whittemore House was originally built in 1884 and has since been transformed into a historic house museum. It also serves as the headquarters of the Clay County Historical Society. Built five years prior to South Dakota statehood, this house is one of the few surviving 19th-century structures in the vicinity of Vermillion. Its builder, Horace J. Austin, came from one of the first groups of settlers to arrive in Dakota in 1859.

== Murals ==
Vermillion has five murals in the downtown business district, three of which are community-based. All three community murals are painted on the Coyote Twin Theater building; the first was painted in 2017, the second in 2019, and the third in 2020. The first mural, "Painting the Town", was designed as the first mural for the Vermillion Community Mural Project by Amber Hansen, a painting professor at the University of South Dakota.

In 2019 and 2020, Reyna Hernandez (Yankton Sioux Tribe of South Dakota) led the painting of two murals on the Coyote Twin Building that form a larger cohesive mural. Hernandez, of the Yankton-Sioux Tribe, was assisted by Elizabeth Skye (Standing Rock Sioux Tribe). Inkpa Mani (Javier Lara-Ruiz) led group discussions to help create imagery taken from Native American creation stories.

== Education ==
The school district is Vermillion School District 13-1.

University of South Dakota is in Vermillion.

== Notable people ==
- Rachael Bella, actress
- Joseph Bottum, writer
- Kevin Brady, U.S. representative
- Shawn Colvin, singer-songwriter
- Doug Dickey, college football coach
- Mary Edelen, member of the South Dakota House of Representatives
- Carl Gunderson, former governor of South Dakota
- Jon Hoadley, Michigan state legislator
- Jeanne Ives, Illinois state representative
- Tim Johnson, U.S. senator
- John L. Jolley, U.S. representative
- Frances Kelsey, physician-scientist
- Jeff Kidder, lawman
- Ben Leber, NFL football linebacker
- Andrew E. Lee, South Dakota's third governor
- Samuel Miller, novelist and screenwriter
- Karen Muenster, state senator
- Paradise Fears, alternative pop-rock band
- Byron S. Payne, Attorney General of South Dakota
- Arthur Rusch, distinguished lawyer, state senator, and former circuit court judge
- Jay C. Swisher, member of the South Dakota House of Representatives
- Todd Tiahrt, U.S. representative
- Abby Whiteside, piano teacher and theorist
- Billy Yost, musician

== Media ==
=== AM radio ===
AM radio stations
Frequency	Call sign	Name	Format	Owner	City
570 kHz	WNAX	WNAX Radio 570	News/Talk	Saga Communications	Yankton
1450 kHz	KYNT	Yankton's Home Team	Soft Adult Contemporary	Riverfront Broadcasting LLC	Yankton
1570 kHz	KVTK	1570 "The Ticket"	Sports Talk	5 Star Communications	Vermillion

=== FM radio ===
FM radio stations
Frequency	Call sign	Name	Format	Owner	Target city/market	City of license
89.7 MHz	KUSD	South Dakota Public Broadcasting	National Public Radio	SD Board of Directors for Educational Telecommunications	Yankton/Vermillion	Vermillion
91.1 MHz	KAOR	Coyote Radio 91.1	College	The University of South Dakota	Yankton/Vermillion	Vermillion
93.1 MHz	KKYA	KK93	Country	Riverfront Broadcasting LLC	Yankton/Vermillion	Yankton
94.3 MHz	KDAM	The Current	Top-40	Riverfront Broadcasting LLC	Yankton/Vermillion	Hartington
104.1 MHz	WNAX-FM	The Wolf 104.1	Country	Saga Communications	Yankton/Vermillion	Yankton
106.3 MHz	KVHT	Classic Hits 106.3	Classic Hits	5 Star Communications	Yankton/Vermillion	Vermillion

== Sister city ==
- Ratingen, North Rhine-Westphalia, Germany (1969)

== See also ==
- List of cities in South Dakota
