= WNAX =

WNAX may refer to:

- WNAX (AM), a radio station (570 AM) licensed to Yankton, South Dakota, United States
- WNAX-FM, a radio station (104.1 FM) licensed to Yankton, South Dakota, United States
