= Speece =

Speece is a surname. Notable people with the surname include:

- By Speece (1897–1974), American baseball player
- Wynn Speece (1917–2007), American radio personality
