= KVTK =

KVTK may refer to:

- KVTK (AM), a radio station (1570 AM) licensed to serve Vermillion, South Dakota, United States
- KVTK (rocket stage), a Russian upper stage for the Angara rocket family
