= KKYA =

- Yankton, South Dakota; United States
- Broadcast area: Yankton-Vermillion
- Frequency: 93.1 MHz
- Branding: Hot Country 93.1

Programming
- Format: Country

Ownership
- Owner: Riverfront Broadcasting LLC; (Riverfront Broadcasting LLC)
- Sister stations: KYNT

History
- Call sign meaning: KKYAnkton

Technical information
- Licensing authority: FCC
- Facility ID: 60863
- Class: C1
- ERP: 100,000 watts
- HAAT: 143 meters (469 feet)
- Transmitter coordinates: 42°43′49″N 97°24′13″W

Links
- Public license information: Public file; LMS
- Website: https://www.hotcountry931.com/

KKYA (93.1 FM, "Hot Country 93.1") is a radio station licensed to serve Yankton, South Dakota, United States. The station is owned and licensed by Riverfront Broadcasting LLC. It airs a country music format.

The station was assigned the KKYA call letters by the Federal Communications Commission.

== History ==
On September 29, 1982, the station was taken off the air temporarily when lightning struck the transmitter building which damaged the ducting and allowed water into the transmission equipment. At the time, the transmitter building was located 10 miles south of Yankton in Nebraska at the intersection of Highway 81 and Nebraska Highway 12. KKYA continues to broadcast from the same site south of Yankton, with studios and offices located in downtown Yankton.

== Ownership ==
In February 2008, Riverfront Broadcasting LLC reached an agreement with NRG Media to purchase this station as part of a six station deal.
