= KVHT =

Radio station in Vermillion, South Dakota

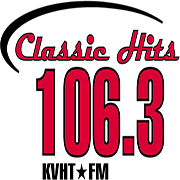
- Vermillion, South Dakota; United States
- Broadcast area: Yankton-Vermillion
- Frequency: 106.3 MHz
- Branding: Classic Hits 106.3

Programming
- Format: Classic hits

Ownership
- Owner: Five Star Communications
- Sister stations: KVTK

History
- First air date: November 16, 1967 (as KVRF at 102.3)
- Former call signs: KVRF (1967–1990)
- Former frequencies: 102.3 MHz (1967–1990)

Technical information
- Licensing authority: FCC
- Facility ID: 14708
- Class: C2
- ERP: 50,000 watts
- HAAT: 119 meters (390 feet)
- Transmitter coordinates: 42°59′45″N 96°49′25″W

Links
- Public license information: Public file; LMS
- Webcast: Listen Live
- Website: kvht.com

KVHT (106.3 FM, "Classic Hits 106.3") is a radio station licensed to serve Vermillion, South Dakota, United States. The station is owned by 5 Star Communications, Inc. It airs a classic hits music format.

The station serves as the flagship station of the University of South Dakota football and men's and women's basketball teams. Women's basketball games that conflict with men's basketball games are broadcast on sister station KVTK.

The station was assigned the KVHT call letters by the Federal Communications Commission on May 7, 1990.

== Programming ==
Until 1999, KVHT aired the syndicated oldies program "The Lost 45s" with Barry Scott.

== Honors and awards ==
In May 2006, KVHT won one first place plaque in the commercial radio division of the South Dakota Associated Press Broadcasters Association news contest. The contest was for the 2005 calendar year.

In November 2006, the American Cancer Society recognized KVHT, Culhane Communications, and broadcaster Randy Hammer for "outstanding contributions in the fight against cancer." They were awarded the Media Mark of Excellence Award for radio in recognition of their "demonstrated commendable promotion of the American Cancer Society."
