= Federal Prison Camp, Yankton =

Federal prison in South Dakota, US

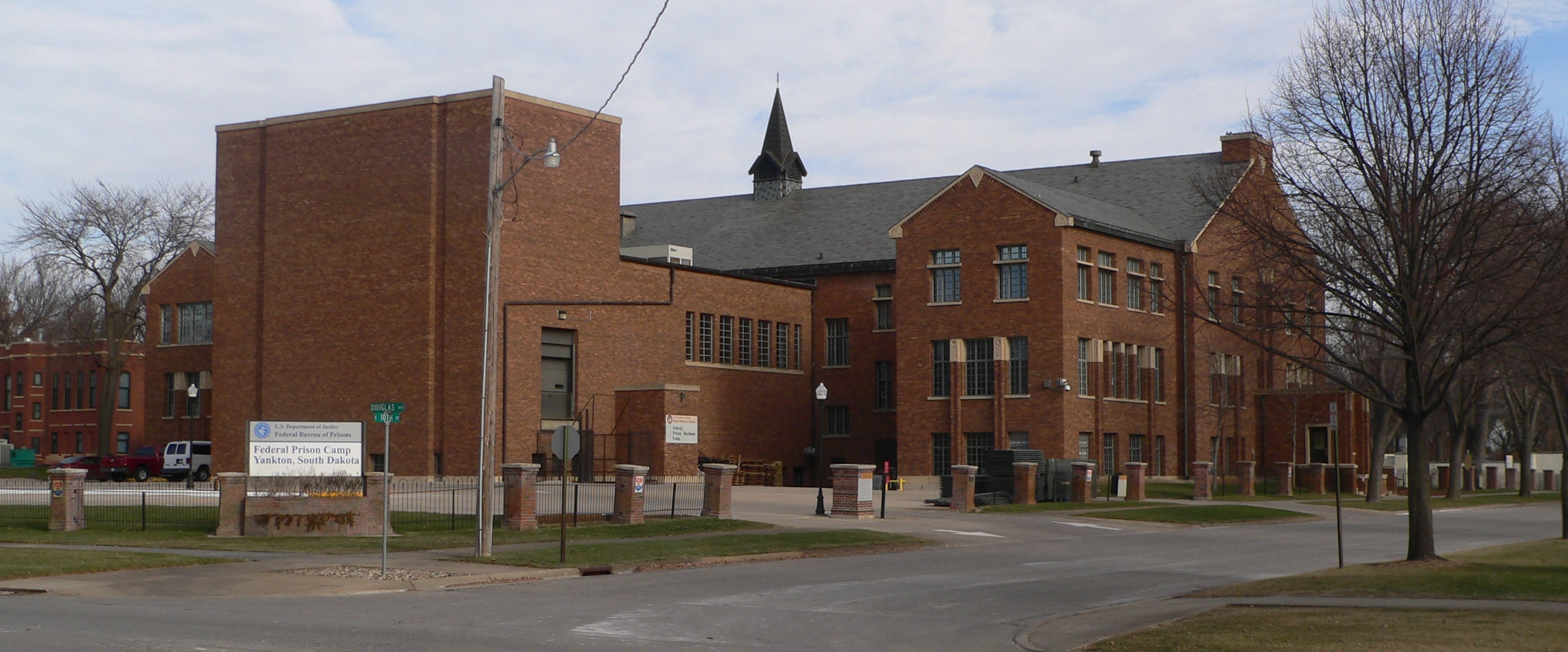
- Interactive map of Federal Prison Camp, Yankton
- Location: Yankton, South Dakota; 42.8809°N 97.3918°W
- Status: Operational
- Security class: Minimum-security
- Population: 424 (April 2024)
- Managed by: Federal Bureau of Prisons
- Warden: Marc Delafoisse

The Federal Prison Camp, Yankton (FPC Yankton) is a minimum-security United States federal prison for male inmates in Yankton, South Dakota. It is operated by the Federal Bureau of Prisons, a division of the United States Department of Justice. The prison is situated on the former campus of Yankton College, which operated until 1984. The site was converted to a prison in 1988.

FPC Yankton is located 60 miles (97 km) northwest of Sioux City, Iowa, and 85 miles (137 km) southwest of Sioux Falls, South Dakota.

== In popular culture ==
Forbes magazine rated FPC Yankton one of "Americas 10 Cushiest Prisons" in 2009. In describing the facility, Asher Hawkins wrote, "The winters are tough, and the nearest city of any size is at least an hour away, but Yankton is a standalone minimum-security facility with a staff that's not too tough on prisoners. White-collar cons can take classes in accounting, business administration and business management."

In Twin Peaks, Special Agent Dale Cooper's doppelgänger is held at FPC Yankton.

== Notable inmates ==
=== Former ===
Inmate Name	Register Number	Photo	Status	Details
Steve Stenger	48972-044		Sentenced on August, 9, 2019. Served 22 months of a 46-month sentence.	Former St. Louis County Executive. Arrested for three federal corruption charges for a pay-to-play scheme exchanging county contracts for campaign donations.
John McTiernan	43029-112		Surrendered to federal prison on April 3, 2013, served a 12-month sentence	Director of Die Hard and Predator. On April 3, 2006, McTiernan was charged in federal court with making a false statement to an FBI investigator in February 2006 about his hiring the private investigator Anthony Pellicano to illegally wiretap Charles Roven, the producer of his film Rollerball, around August 2000.

== See also ==
- List of U.S. federal prisons
- Federal Bureau of Prisons
- Incarceration in the United States
