= Human Services Center =

- U.S. National Register of Historic Places
- U.S. Historic district
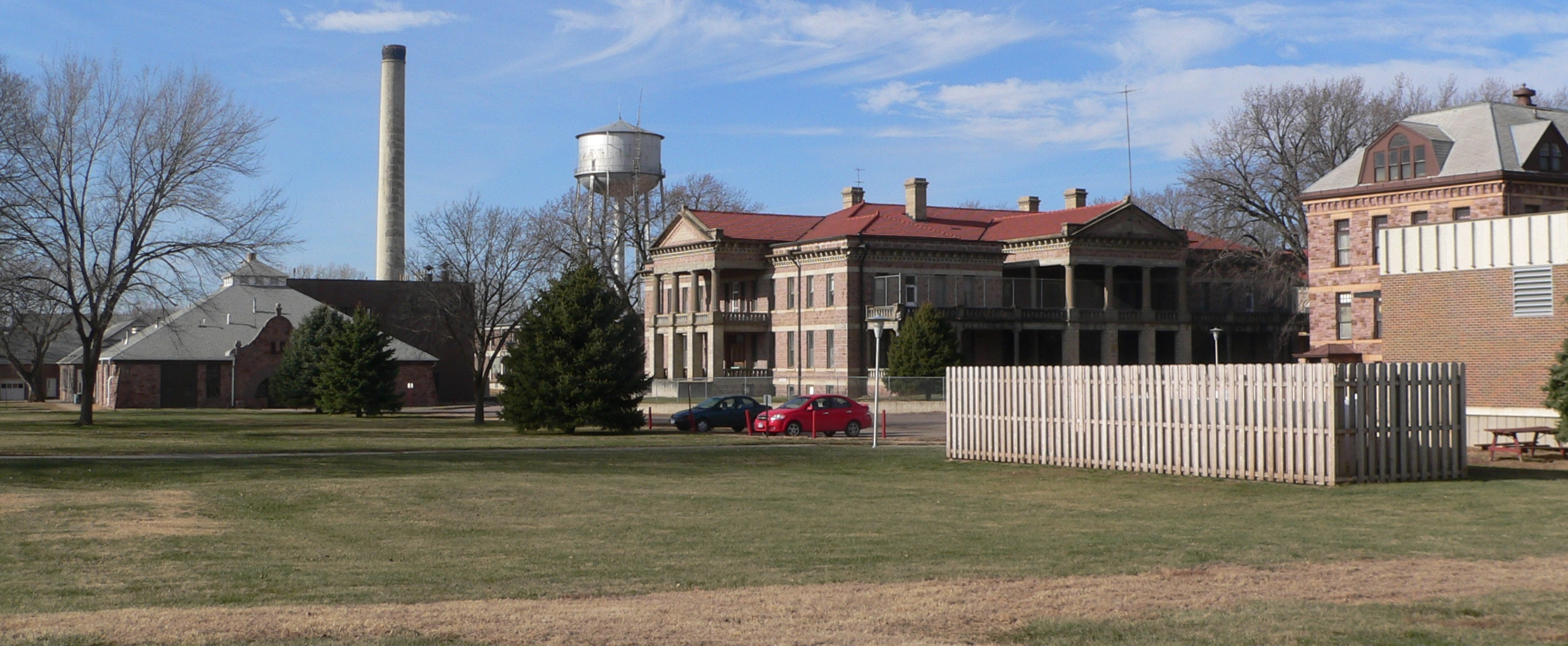
- The Hospital as seen from the south, showing the power plant, the administration and the water tower.

- Location within South Dakota Location within the United States
- Location: Off US 81, Yankton, South Dakota
- Coordinates: 42°54′52″N 97°25′40″W
- Built: 1882
- Architect: Mead, Dr. Leonard C.
- Architectural style: Late 19th And 20th Century Revivals, Late Victorian
- MPS: Northern and Central Townships of Yankton MRA
- NRHP reference No.: 80003771
- Added to NRHP: April 16, 1980

The Human Services Center in Yankton, South Dakota is a psychiatric hospital that was built in 1882. It was listed on the National Register of Historic Places in 1980.

It was included in the National Trust for Historic Preservation's 2009 list of America's Most Endangered Places. "Founded in 1879 as the South Dakota Hospital for the Insane, the institution’s collection of neo-Classical, Art Deco and Italianate buildings have long stood vacant, and the state plans to tear down 11 of them."

The institution's name has been changed several times from South Dakota State Hospital for the Insane to South Dakota Lunatic Asylum to South Dakota State Hospital, to Yankton State Hospital.

== History and present state ==
In 1879, Governor William A. Howard considered the cities of Vermillion, Elk Point, and Canton when he finally decided on Yankton. Yankton is situated on the Missouri River and was at that time the capital of the sparsely-settled Dakota Territory (encompassing present-day North and South Dakota). The hospital was constructed at a total cost of $2,286.85. During the first six months 31 patients were admitted. In 1880, 50 patients caused overcrowding, and the hospital was also understaffed. The population of Yankton was over 3,400, a remarkable increase from the less than 50 in 1859. In 1899, a devastating fire took the lives of seventeen women patients. This led the legislature to seriously consider giving much needed funds to the hospital. They built new smaller buildings, taking precautions to make the walls fireproof, and the rooms for the patients were made much smaller.

In 1918, the name of the hospital was officially changed from Dakota Hospital for the Insane to the Yankton State Hospital. This was done because of complaints that the original name had a derogatory connotation and other types of patients such as alcoholics, drug addicts, and epileptics were also housed there. In the late 1920s and early 1930s, the institution and the rest of the nation, went through a very difficult period. An increasing rate of admissions combined with a decreasing budget due to the Great Depression. Overcrowding was a serious problem in the mid and late 1930s. However, incoming patients were released within a few months, due to updates in healthcare, thus helping to ease the overcrowding problem.

The famous psychiatrist, Leo Kanner, MD, served at YSH from 1924 to 1928, after immigrating to the United States from Austria. It was here that he learned most about disabled children and ultimately led him to define classic autism for the first time. While at YSH, Kanner also published medical articles about syphilis, generalized paralysis, and adrenaline.

World War II disrupted the flow of progress. Wages at the institution were poor and with so many men gone to war, hospital employees left to take up better-paying jobs. The 1950s brought increased understanding of mental illness and relatives of patients were more willing to accept them, rather than wanting to hide them in Yankton. Medical work at Yankton became more systematized than ever before. Changing attitudes toward the mentally ill contributed greatly to improving conditions at the hospital. Various forms of physical force, such as the use of strait-jackets, were discontinued.

The 1960s saw a significant enlargement of the medical staff. While the staff was also of better quality than at any previous time, patients being locked up in the back wards as punishment and being threatened with never getting out of the hospital for disobeying the rules continued. The need was also seen at this time for a geriatric department. In addition, the population at the hospital continuously decreased year after year. From 1968 to 1973, a great deal of activity took place. Construction was started on a new central building as well as another facility. In addition, four other buildings were renovated. On July 1, 1974, the name of the facility was changed from Yankton State Hospital to the South Dakota Human Services Center. The change was enacted by session of the Legislature to more clearly reflect the services such as dietary help, mental health, drug addicts, alcoholics, geriatrics, and epileptics.

The 1980s saw further development in services and programs available to HSC patients. In 1991, Governor George S. Mickelson found it would be more costly to renovate the old buildings dating back to the 1800s than to construct new ones specifically designed to meet the needs of the state. Governor Mickelson advanced bills proposing design and construction of a new psychiatric facility which passed by an overwhelming majority of the 1992 State Legislature.

Dedication and Ground Breaking Ceremonies were held on April 28, 1994. Recognizing the efforts of Governor Mickelson, the new facility was dedicated "George S. Mickelson Center for the Neurosciences." The new facility was completed in the fall of 1996 and was occupied in October 1996. Skywalks have been built to connect the partially renovated original buildings. The hospital remains in operation although many original buildings have been turned into a museum.

== Photographs ==
- 1935 aerial photo of the Yankton State Hospital complex: https://web.archive.org/web/20120304070248/http://www.daylife.com/photo/02JC8aY5QhaL5
