= Charles Gurney Hotel =

- U.S. National Register of Historic Places
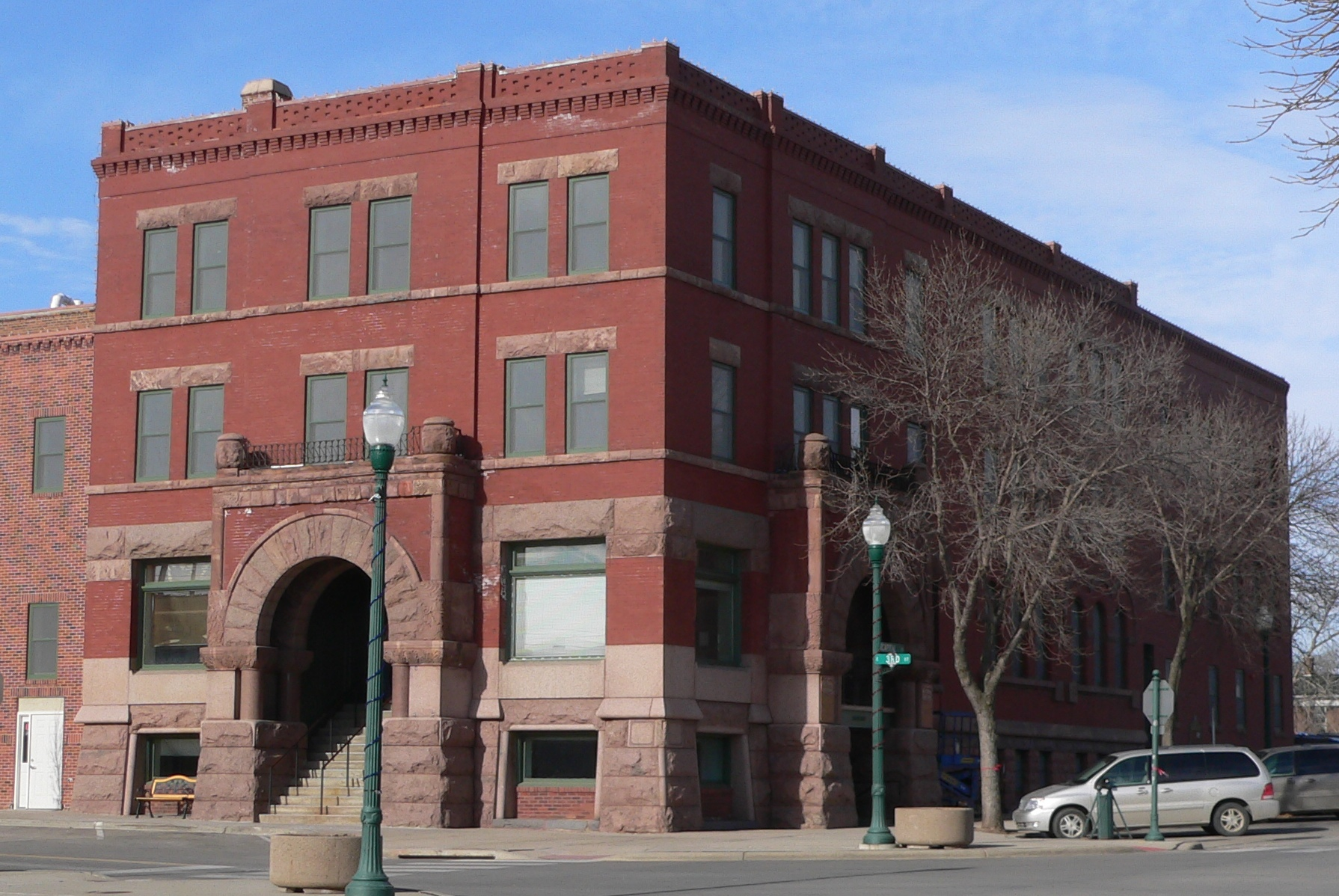
- The Charles Gurney Hotel in 2010

- Location within South Dakota Location within the United States
- Location: 3rd and Capital Streets, Yankton, South Dakota
- Coordinates: 42°52′12″N 97°23′26″W
- Area: 1 acre (0.40 ha)
- Built: 1891
- Built by: J.W.C. Morrison
- Architect: J.H. Coxhead
- Architectural style: Richardsonian Romanesque
- NRHP reference No.: 79002410
- Added to NRHP: August 3, 1979

The Charles Gurney Hotel is a historic three-story building in Yankton, South Dakota. Replacing the original St. Charles Hotel (constructed in 1870 by J.W.C. Morrison of local cottonwood lumber), the present building was built in 1891 with brick and Sioux Falls granite. It was designed in the Richardsonian Romanesque Revival style by architect J.H. Coxhead. It was originally known as the Hotel Pierce, and it was built where the 1870 St. Charles Hotel once stood. It was later renamed the Portland Hotel by its new owner, Alfred Crebbin, presumably in recognition of the importance of the local manufacture of Portland cement (see Western Portland Cement plant). In the 1940s, it was acquired and remodelled by Charles Gurney, and it became known as the Charles Gurney Hotel. It was purchased by Elza Anderson in 1962. It has been listed on the National Register of Historic Places since August 3, 1979.
