= Yankton, South Dakota =

- City
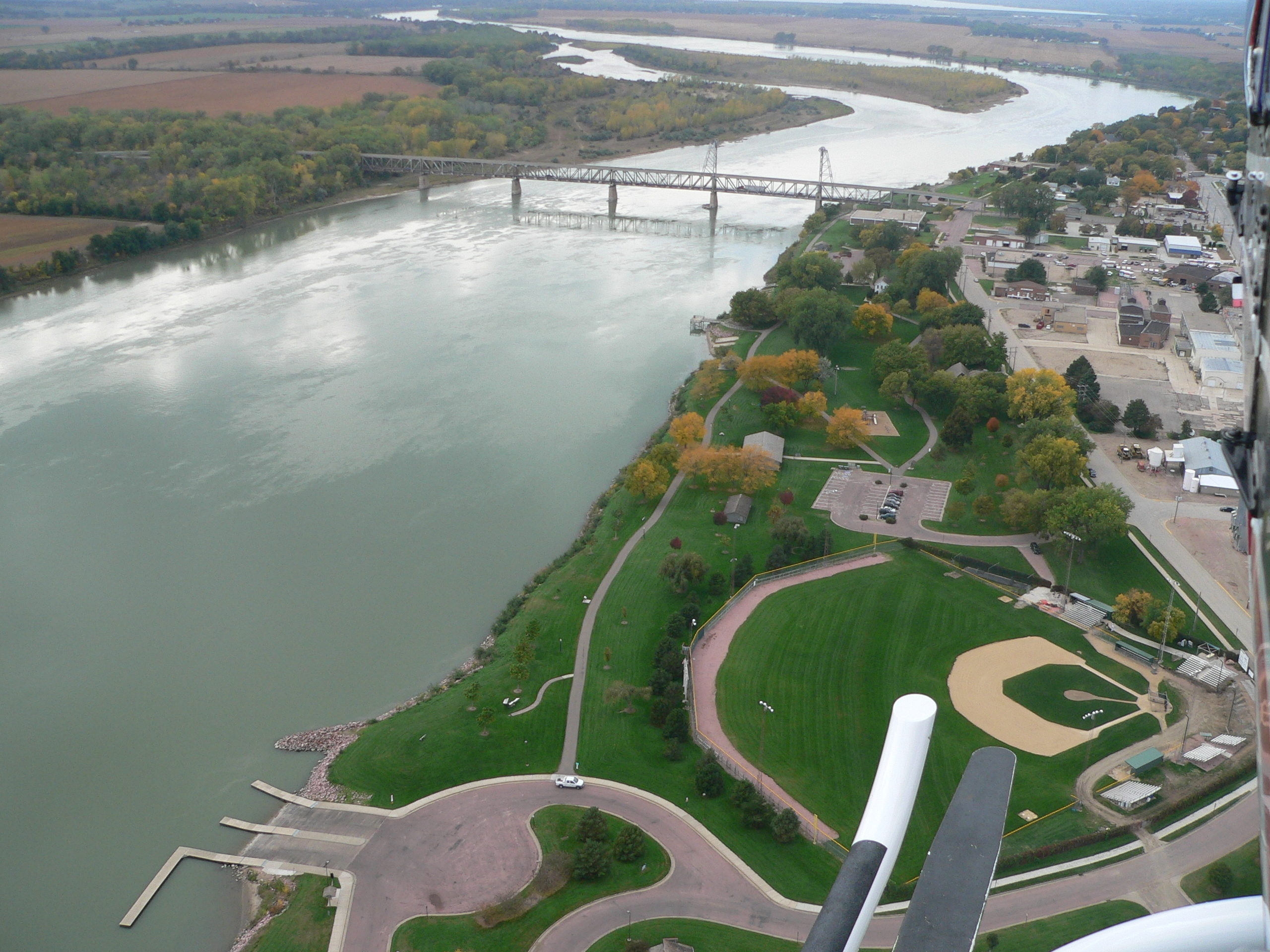
- Yankton (right) along the Missouri River with the Meridian Bridge connecting Nebraska, looking west
- Nickname: "Mother City of the Dakotas"
- Location in Yankton County and the state of South Dakota
- Coordinates: 42°52′45″N 97°23′18″W
- Country: United States
- State: South Dakota
- County: Yankton
- <-- Settled -->: 1858
- Incorporated: 1869

Government
  - Type: Council-Manager
  - Mayor: Mike Villanueva
  - City Manager: Amy Leon

Area
  - City: 8.91 sq mi (23.08 km^{2})
  - Land: 8.67 sq mi (22.45 km^{2})
  - Water: 0.24 sq mi (0.62 km^{2})
- Elevation: 1,243 ft (379 m)

Population (2020)
  - City: 15,411
  - Density: 1,777.5/sq mi (686.31/km^{2})
  - Metro: 23,297 (US: 485th)
- Time zone: UTC−6 (CST)
  - Summer (DST): UTC−5 (CDT)
- ZIP codes: 57078-57079
- Area code: 605
- FIPS code: 46-73060
- GNIS feature ID: 1267665
- Website: cityofyankton.org

Yankton is a city in and the county seat of Yankton County, South Dakota, United States. It became a city in 1889.

The population was 15,411 at the 2020 census, making it the 7th most populous city in South Dakota, and it is the principal city of the Yankton Micropolitan Statistical Area, which includes the entirety of Yankton County and which had an estimated population of 23,297 as of July 1, 2021. As the first capital of Dakota Territory, it was named after the Yankton tribe of Western Dakota people; Yankton is derived from the Dakota word I-hank-ton-wan ("the end village").

Yankton is located on the Missouri River just downstream of the Gavins Point Dam and Lewis and Clark Lake, and just upstream of the confluence with the James River. The United States National Park Service's headquarters for the Missouri National Recreational River are located in the city. The Human Services Center was established as a psychiatric hospital in 1882 and is on the National Register of Historic Places.

Yankton is commonly referred to as the "River City", due to its proximity to the Missouri River and the importance the river played in the city's settlement and development. Yankton has also earned the nickname "Mother City of the Dakotas", due to the early important role it played in the creation and development of the Dakota Territory, which later became the 39th and 40th U.S. states of North and South Dakota.

Owing to the early exploitation of Fort Hays Limestone for cement manufacture, including shipment of cement to the construction of the Panama Canal, Yankton once also had the nickname "Cement City".

== Geography ==
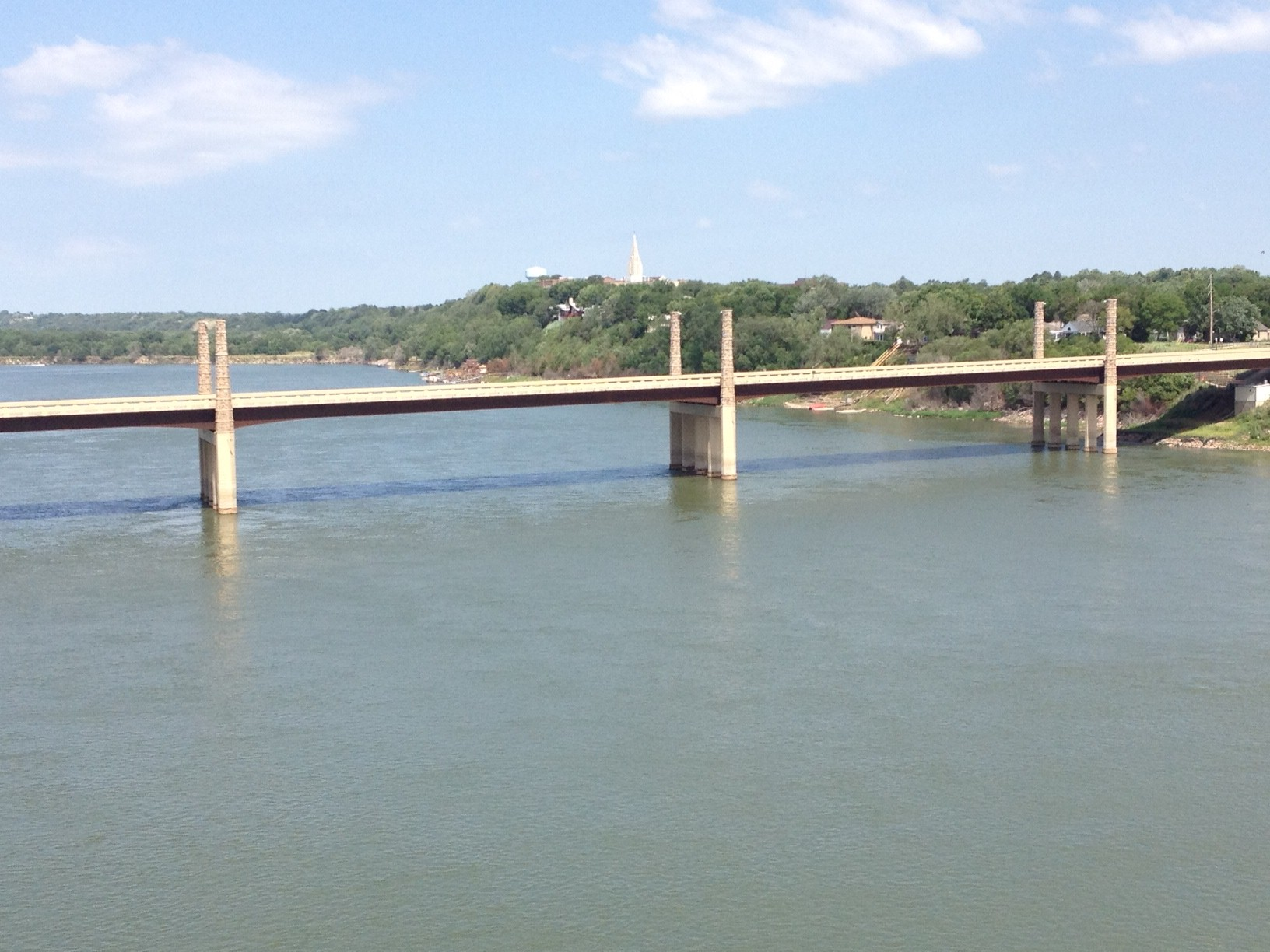
Yankton, as viewed from the Meridian Bridge with the Discovery Bridge crossing the Missouri River in the foreground, and the steeple of the Bishop Martin Marty Chapel in the background

Yankton is located in southern South Dakota on the state's border with Nebraska. The city is located on one of the last free-flowing, natural stretches of the Missouri River; this segment of the river, between Gavins Point Dam four miles west of Yankton, and Ponca State Park in Nebraska, has been designated by the U.S. National Park Service as the Missouri National Recreational River.

The city is located approximately six miles west of the point where the James River flows into the Missouri.

The central business district of the city is located on a natural landing along the Missouri River, and city rises in the west to "Mount Marty" (actually a high bluff along the river). The city is also intersected by the Marne Creek, which also flows into the Missouri River. Lewis and Clark Lake is located four miles west of the city.

According to the United States Census Bureau, the city has a total area of 8.45 square miles (21.89 km^{2}), of which 8.21 square miles (21.26 km^{2}) is land and 0.24 square miles (0.62 km^{2}) is water.

=== Climate ===
Yankton has a humid continental climate (Köppen Dfa), with cold winters and hot summers.

Climate data for Yankton 2 E, South Dakota (1991−2020 normals, extremes since 1932)
Month	Jan	Feb	Mar	Apr	May	Jun	Jul	Aug	Sep	Oct	Nov	Dec	Year
Record high °F (°C)	74 (23)	78 (26)	93 (34)	95 (35)	107 (42)	110 (43)	116 (47)	112 (44)	105 (41)	96 (36)	83 (28)	70 (21)	116 (47)
Mean maximum °F (°C)	54.2 (12.3)	59.6 (15.3)	74.1 (23.4)	84.8 (29.3)	90.9 (32.7)	96.8 (36.0)	98.0 (36.7)	96.6 (35.9)	92.8 (33.8)	85.8 (29.9)	71.6 (22.0)	55.4 (13.0)	100.1 (37.8)
Mean daily maximum °F (°C)	30.0 (−1.1)	34.9 (1.6)	47.1 (8.4)	60.0 (15.6)	71.9 (22.2)	82.4 (28.0)	87.1 (30.6)	84.8 (29.3)	77.5 (25.3)	63.3 (17.4)	47.2 (8.4)	34.0 (1.1)	60.0 (15.6)
Daily mean °F (°C)	20.2 (−6.6)	24.6 (−4.1)	35.9 (2.2)	47.7 (8.7)	59.8 (15.4)	70.7 (21.5)	75.4 (24.1)	73.1 (22.8)	64.8 (18.2)	50.9 (10.5)	36.2 (2.3)	24.5 (−4.2)	48.7 (9.3)
Mean daily minimum °F (°C)	10.4 (−12.0)	14.2 (−9.9)	24.6 (−4.1)	35.4 (1.9)	47.7 (8.7)	58.9 (14.9)	63.8 (17.7)	61.5 (16.4)	52.1 (11.2)	38.5 (3.6)	25.3 (−3.7)	14.9 (−9.5)	37.3 (2.9)
Mean minimum °F (°C)	−12.7 (−24.8)	−7.1 (−21.7)	2.8 (−16.2)	20.5 (−6.4)	33.7 (0.9)	47.1 (8.4)	51.8 (11.0)	50.0 (10.0)	35.7 (2.1)	21.7 (−5.7)	6.7 (−14.1)	−6.9 (−21.6)	−16.7 (−27.1)
Record low °F (°C)	−29 (−34)	−28 (−33)	−25 (−32)	2 (−17)	24 (−4)	33 (1)	41 (5)	35 (2)	23 (−5)	12 (−11)	−15 (−26)	−31 (−35)	−31 (−35)
Average precipitation inches (mm)	0.65 (17)	0.91 (23)	1.60 (41)	3.36 (85)	3.68 (93)	4.03 (102)	3.46 (88)	3.26 (83)	2.85 (72)	2.56 (65)	1.27 (32)	1.03 (26)	28.66 (728)
Average snowfall inches (cm)	6.7 (17)	8.5 (22)	4.7 (12)	3.7 (9.4)	0.2 (0.51)	0.0 (0.0)	0.0 (0.0)	0.0 (0.0)	0.0 (0.0)	0.8 (2.0)	5.9 (15)	7.6 (19)	38.1 (97)
Average precipitation days (≥ 0.01 in)	4.8	5.3	6.3	8.8	11.6	10.6	8.0	8.5	7.3	6.9	4.8	5.2	88.1
Average snowy days (≥ 0.1 in)	3.3	3.6	2.4	1.2	0.1	0.0	0.0	0.0	0.0	0.5	1.6	3.8	16.5
Source: NOAA

== Demographics ==
Historical population
Census	Pop.	Note	%±
1880	3,431		—
1890	3,670		7.0%
1900	4,125		12.4%
1910	3,787		−8.2%
1920	5,024		32.7%
1930	6,072		20.9%
1940	6,798		12.0%
1950	7,709		13.4%
1960	9,279		20.4%
1970	11,919		28.5%
1980	12,011		0.8%
1990	12,703		5.8%
2000	13,528		6.5%
2010	14,454		6.8%
2020	15,411		6.6%
2021 (est.)	15,483		0.5%
U.S. Decennial Census; 2020 Census

=== 2020 census ===
As of the 2020 census, Yankton had a population of 15,411. The median age was 40.6 years. 21.2% of residents were under the age of 18 and 20.5% of residents were 65 years of age or older. For every 100 females there were 99.9 males, and for every 100 females age 18 and over there were 99.2 males age 18 and over.

99.1% of residents lived in urban areas, while 0.9% lived in rural areas.

There were 6,392 households in Yankton, of which 25.2% had children under the age of 18 living in them. Of all households, 41.0% were married-couple households, 22.5% were households with a male householder and no spouse or partner present, and 28.9% were households with a female householder and no spouse or partner present. About 38.3% of all households were made up of individuals and 15.6% had someone living alone who was 65 years of age or older.

There were 6,942 housing units, of which 7.9% were vacant. The homeowner vacancy rate was 2.1% and the rental vacancy rate was 7.6%.

Racial composition as of the 2020 census
Race	Number	Percent
White	13,341	86.6%
Black or African American	270	1.8%
American Indian and Alaska Native	504	3.3%
Asian	106	0.7%
Native Hawaiian and Other Pacific Islander	8	0.1%
Some other race	387	2.5%
Two or more races	795	5.2%
Hispanic or Latino (of any race)	996	6.5%

=== 2010 census ===
As of the census of 2010, there were 14,454 people, 5,909 households, and 3,348 families residing in the city. The population density was 1,760.5 inhabitants per square mile (679.7/km^{2}). There were 6,365 housing units at an average density of 775.3 units per square mile (299.3 units/km^{2}). The racial makeup of the city was 92.1% White, 2.1% African American, 2.3% Native American, 0.7% Asian, 1.3% from other races, and 1.6% from two or more races. Hispanic or Latino of any race were 3.4% of the population.

There were 5,909 households, of which 27.3% had children under the age of 18 living with them, 43.1% were married couples living together, 10.1% had a female householder with no husband present, 3.5% had a male householder with no wife present, and 43.3% were non-families. 37.5% of all households were made up of individuals, and 15.2% had someone living alone who was 65 years of age or older. The average household size was 2.17 and the average family size was 2.87.

The median age in the city was 40.4 years. 20.9% of residents were under the age of 18; 9% were between the ages of 18 and 24; 26% were from 25 to 44; 26.1% were from 45 to 64; and 17.9% were 65 years of age or older. The gender makeup of the city was 50.5% male and 49.5% female.

=== 2000 census ===
As of the census of 2000, there were 13,528 people, 5,369 households, and 3,232 families residing in the city. The population density was 1,743.2 inhabitants per square mile (673.1/km^{2}). There were 5,735 housing units at an average density of 739.0 units per square mile (285.3 units/km^{2}). The racial makeup of the city was 94.35% White, 1.64% African American, 1.58% Native American, 0.50% Asian, 0.03% Pacific Islander, 0.90% from other races, and 0.99% from two or more races. Hispanic or Latino of any race were 2.46% of the population.

There were 5,369 households, out of which 29.5% had children under the age of 18 living with them, 47.5% were married couples living together, 9.8% had a female householder with no husband present, and 39.8% were non-families. 34.9% of all households were made up of individuals, and 15.0% had someone living alone who was 65 years of age or older. The average household size was 2.27 and the average family size was 2.96.

In the city, the population was spread out, with 23.4% under the age of 18, 9.8% from 18 to 24, 28.2% from 25 to 44, 21.4% from 45 to 64, and 17.2% who were 65 years of age or older. The median age was 38 years. For every 100 females, there were 96.1 males. For every 100 females age 18 and over, there were 95.0 males.

As of 2000 the median income for a household in the city was $31,843, and the median income for a family was $44,009. Men had a median income of $29,012 versus $20,577 for women. The per capita income for the city was $17,954. About 6.2% of families and 10.2% of the population were below the poverty line, including 10.8% of those under age 18 and 9.1% of those age 65 or over.

According to the 2003 Coldwell Banker Housing Price Comparison Index (HPCI), Yankton was found to have the lowest housing costs of any municipal entity in the entire United States. This is no longer the case as of the 2005 HPCI.

== History ==
=== Native inhabitants ===
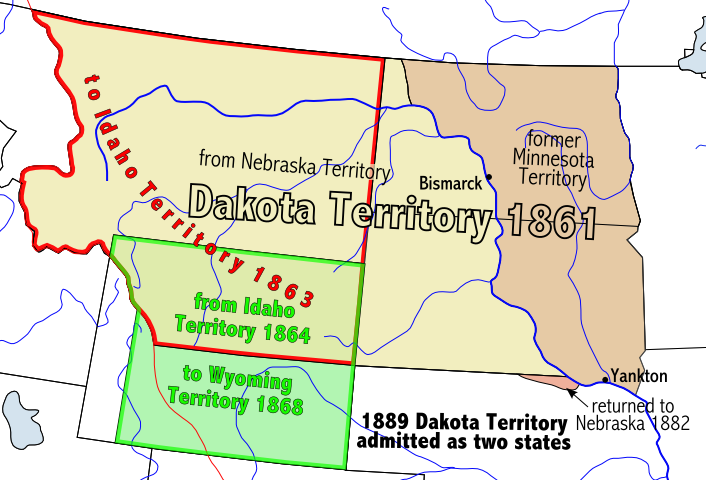
The Dakota Territory in 1861.

The site of Yankton was occupied by the Yankton Sioux (Dakota) prior to the arrival of European settlers. As part of the vast Louisiana Purchase, the site of Yankton was visited by Lewis and Clark in 1804. In the journals of the expedition, the explorers write of a meeting on August 30, 1804, with members of the Yankton Sioux Tribe on a Missouri River bluff known as Calumet Bluff. As recently as 1857, the site of Yankton was occupied by a village of Yankton Sioux led by Chief Pa-le-ne-a-pa-pe ("Struck by the Ree"). Two years later, with the signing of the Yankton Treaty of 1858, the land was opened for settlement. The city was founded where the small Rhine Creek (renamed Marne Creek in World War I) flowed into the Missouri River. The city grew as a stop for steamboats to take on fresh water and supplies, especially after steamboat traffic boomed when gold was discovered in the Black Hills.

=== Dakota territorial capital ===
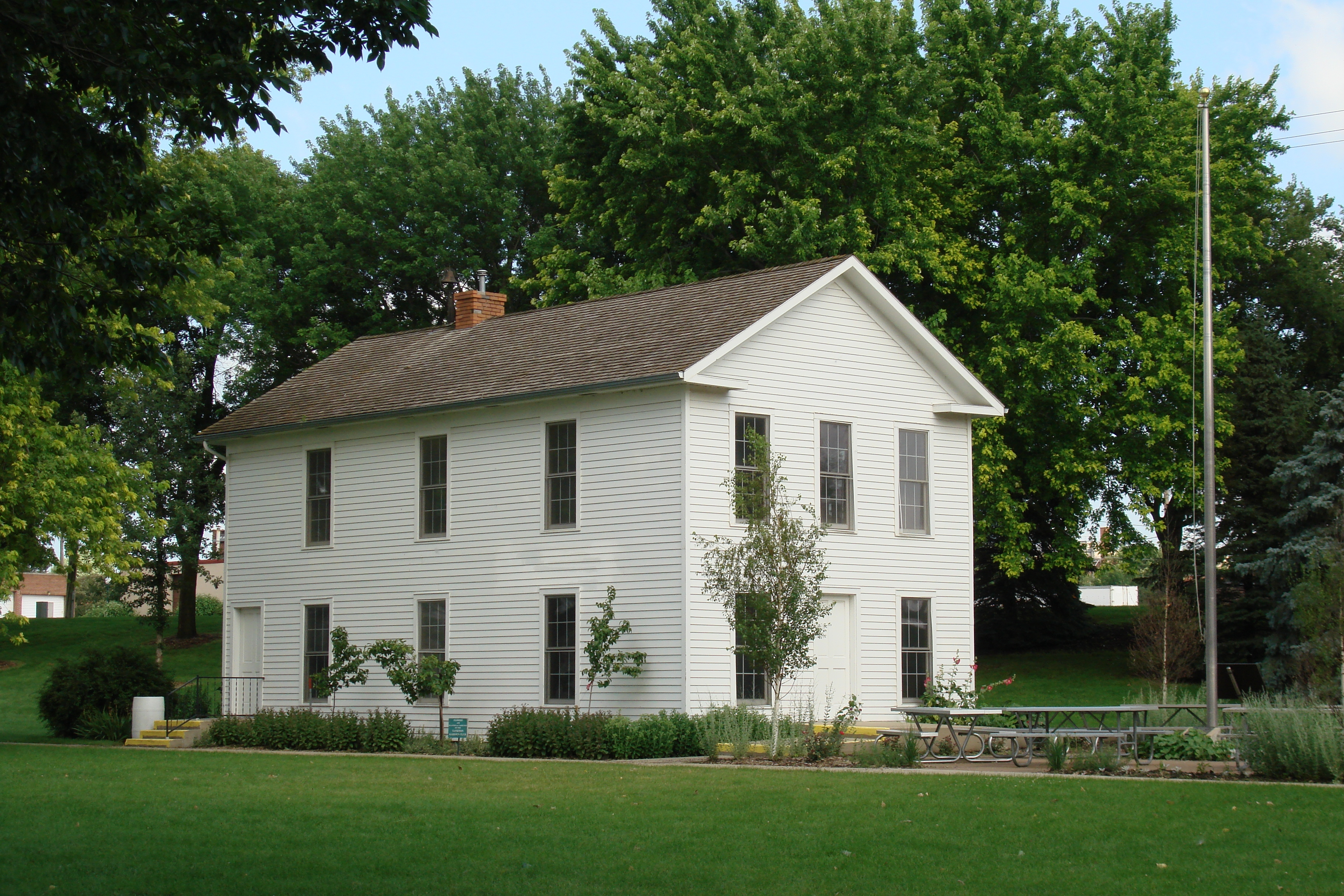
A modern replica of the Dakota Territorial Capitol building stands in Yankton's Riverside Park.

With two days left in his term, President James Buchanan signed a law on March 2, 1861, creating the Dakota Territory. Yankton was designated as the territorial capital, and newly inaugurated President Abraham Lincoln appointed his personal physician, William A. Jayne of Springfield, Illinois, as the first territorial governor. The territorial capitol building, a plain, two-story wooden structure, was located at the intersection of Fourth and Capitol Streets; the original structure has been demolished, but a replica of the building has been constructed in Yankton's Riverside Park. Yankton served as the territorial capital until 1883 when the capital was moved to Bismarck (now the capital of North Dakota).

=== Yankton stockade ===
In response to the Dakota War of 1862 in western Minnesota, Governor Jayne issued a proclamation on August 30, 1862, requiring every male between the ages of 18 and 50 in every settlement in eastern Dakota, be formed into militias to protect against expected attacks from the Native Americans. In response, the Yankton militia built a stockade at the corner of Third Street and Broadway Avenue of approximately 200,000 square feet. Settlers from the surrounding area, and as far away as Sioux Falls and Bon Homme County, fled to Yankton to seek shelter in the structure.

Although roving bands of Native Americans did approach Yankton over the course of several weeks, no attack ensued, and the stockade was eventually abandoned and torn down. There is a historical marker at the site of the former stockade.

Among the most notable events that occurred in Yankton while capital, Jack McCall, murderer of Wild Bill Hickok in Deadwood on August 2, 1876, was tried in Yankton for Hickok's murder, found guilty, and was hanged on March 1, 1877, at the age of 24. His body is buried in a Yankton cemetery.

=== Yankton College ===
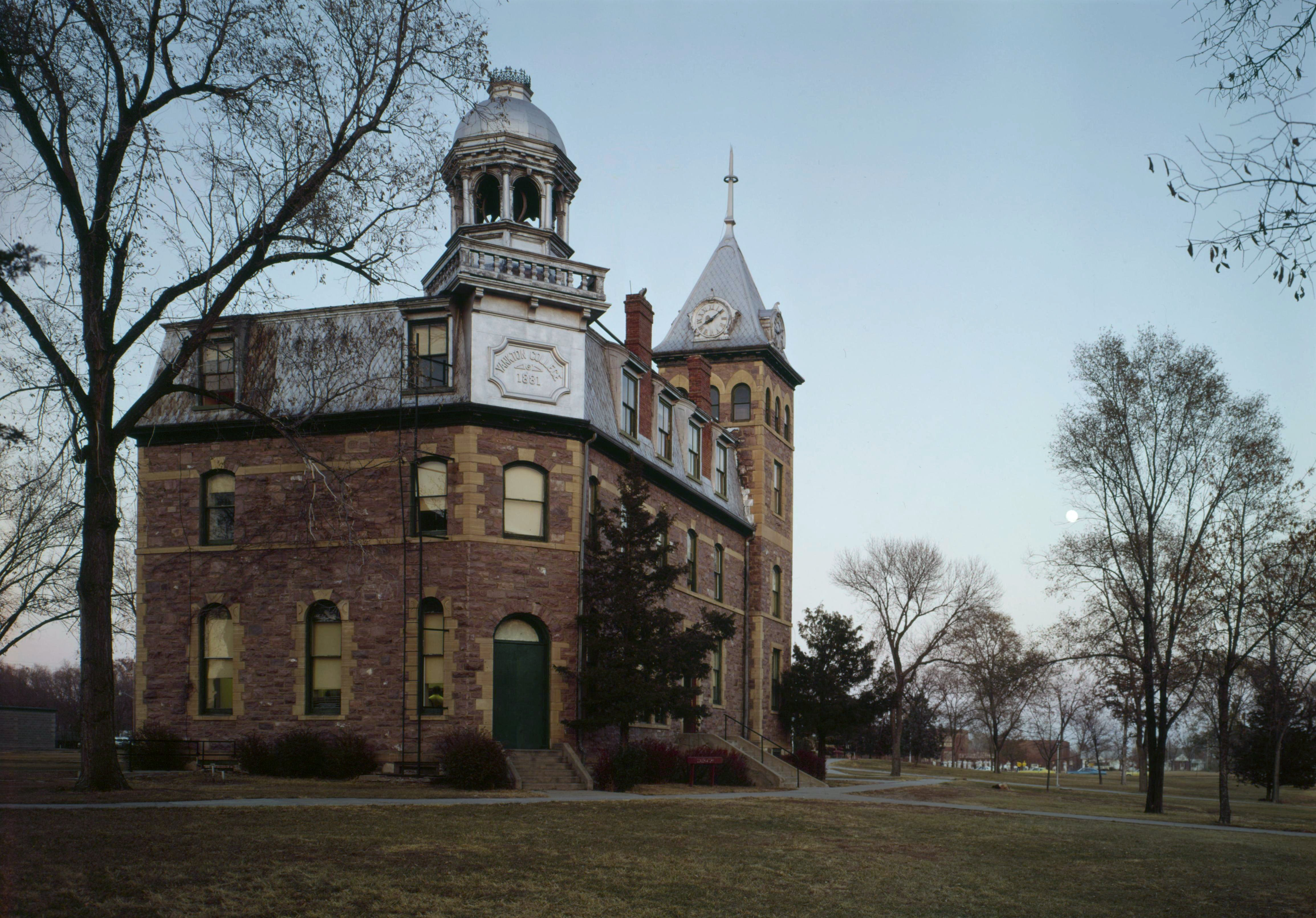
The conservatory building on the former Yankton College campus – part of the Yankton Federal Prison Camp.

At the urging of the Reverend Joseph Ward of Yankton, the General Association of Congregational Churches in Dakota Territory voted in May 1881 to establish "Pilgrim College" in Yankton, which was to be the first private institution of higher learning in Dakota. When the college was incorporated in August 1881, the name had been changed to "Yankton College". Classes commenced in October 1882, and Yankton College played a prominent role in the city for over 100 years.

Then, in 1983, the small liberal arts college was forced to close due to financial insolvency. After remaining vacant for several years, the historic campus, which is listed on the National Register of Historic Places, was purchased by the United States Federal Bureau of Prisons for use as a minimum security prison. The Federal Prison Camp – Yankton houses approx 450 male inmates.

=== River port and the flood of 1881 ===
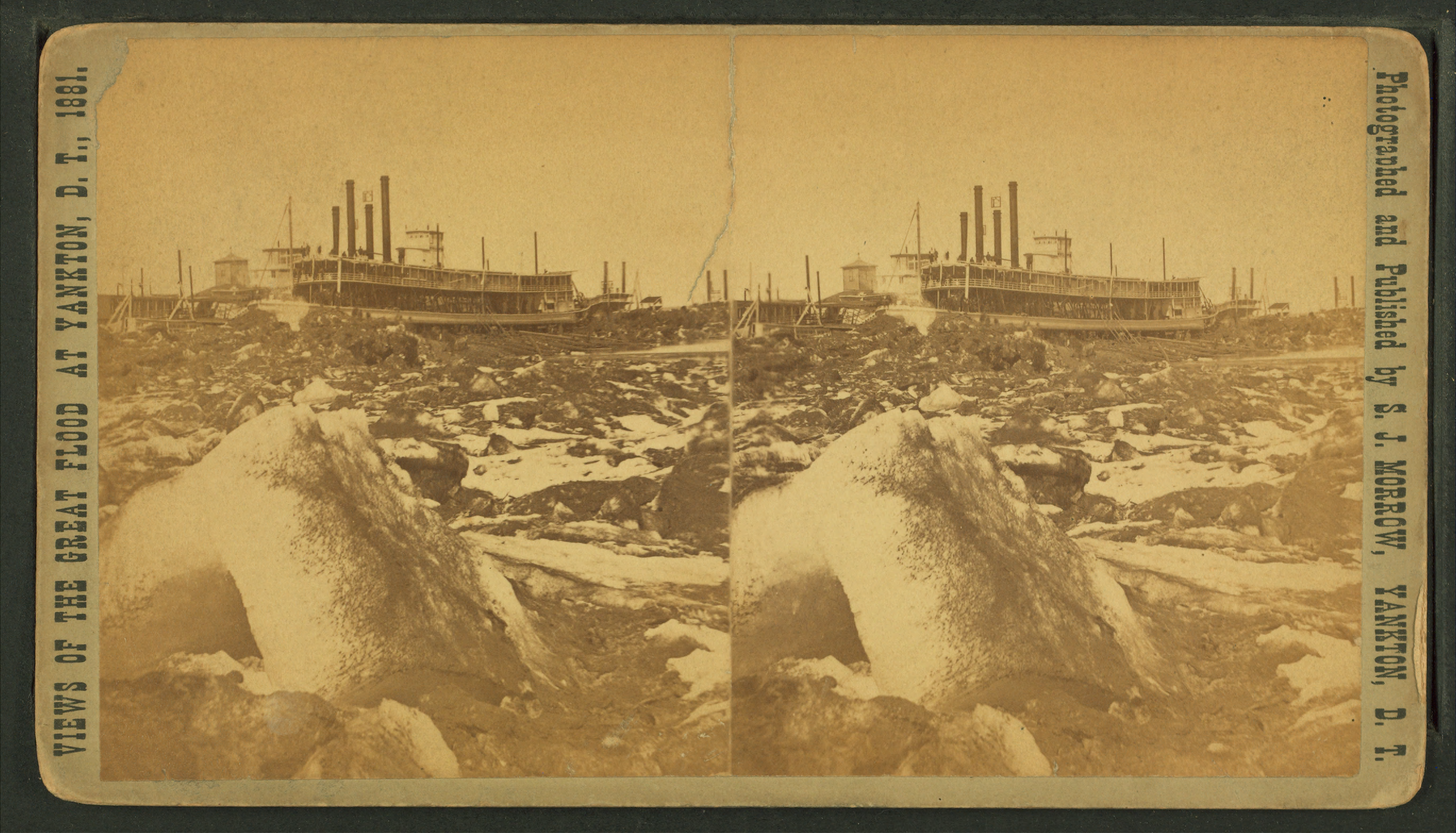
A view of Yankton's riverfront after the flood of March 1881.

Since its founding, Yankton enjoyed a natural advantage as a steamboat landing along the Missouri River due to the fact that its landing stretched along the entire length of the town's riverfront. The first steamboat to reach Yankton from St. Louis arrived in 1859, providing goods and supplies to settlers and fur-traders in upper and central Dakota. Since then, the city continued to grow and quickly became the second largest city in South Dakota. The railroad reached Yankton in 1872. In 1874, gold was discovered in the Black Hills and prospectors rushed into Dakota Territory. By 1880, Yankton had become an established riverboat port on the Missouri River. It retained its position as the second largest city in South Dakota until the beginning of the 20th century.

The city's status as an important port was literally crushed on March 27, 1881, when an ice dam on the Missouri River burst, sending flood waters and giant blocks of ice flowing towards the town.

The resulting flood waters continued to accumulate behind the debris, and by March 29, the town's riverfront and downtown were covered in water, ice and rock, destroying or stranding several riverboats that were moored there. As a result of this flood, and the expansion of railroads as a preferred method of shipping goods, Yankton's river boat traffic was reduced, and the city's role as a prominent stopping point on the way west dwindled over the next several years.

Francis Marion Ziebach established the second newspaper in the area that became South Dakota, the Weekly Dakotan, in Yankton on June 6, 1861, bringing his outfit from Sioux Falls by team and wagon. A second newspaper started by Ziebach, is still published as the Yankton Press and Dakotan.

In 1882, the Human Services Center was established as a psychiatric hospital. On June 2, 1883, Dakota Territory Governor Nehemiah G. Ordway moved the territorial capital from Yankton to Bismarck.

=== National Register of Historic Places ===
A Sample of Historic Structures in Yankton, South Dakota

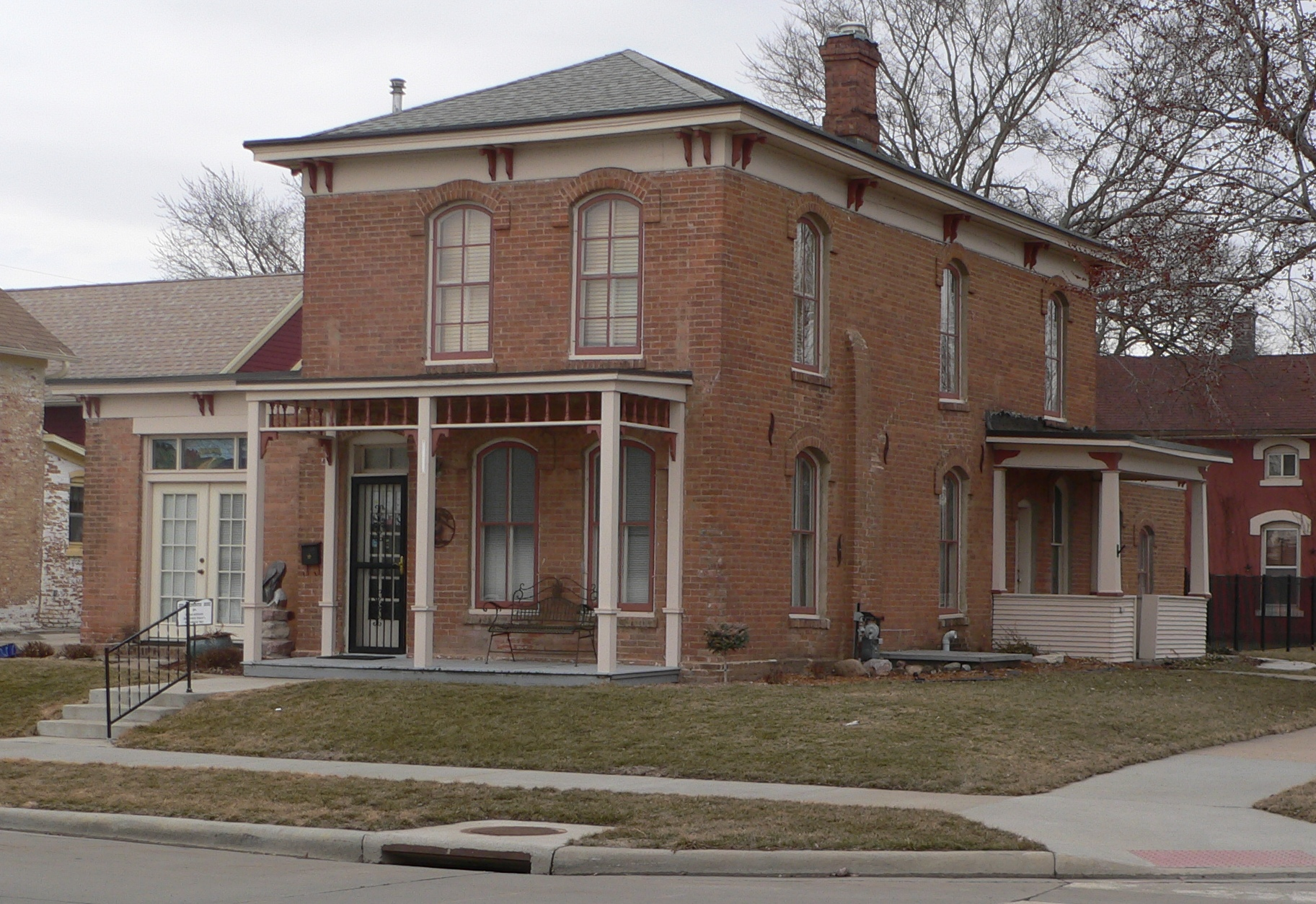
Gov. Pennington House

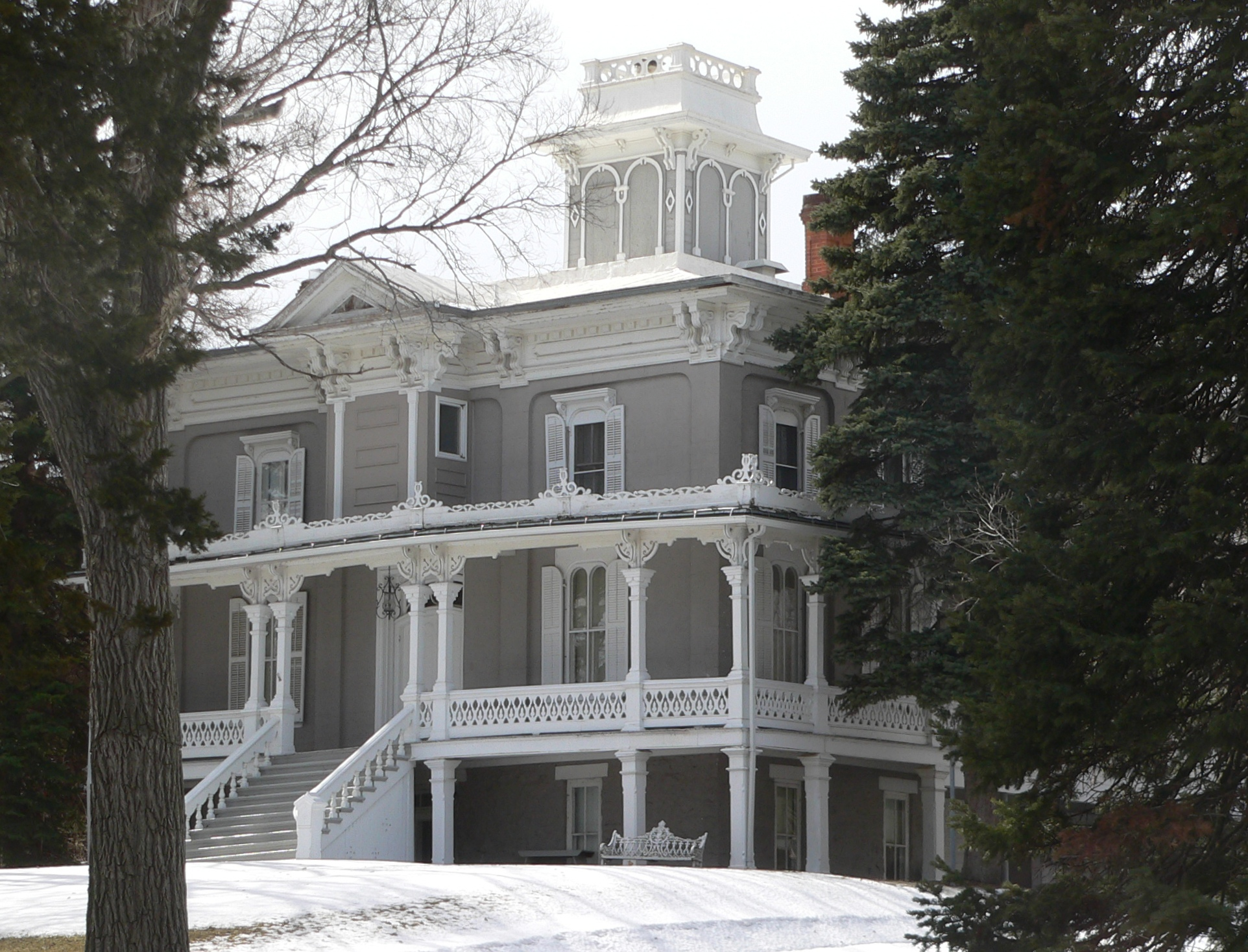
Ohlman-Shannon House

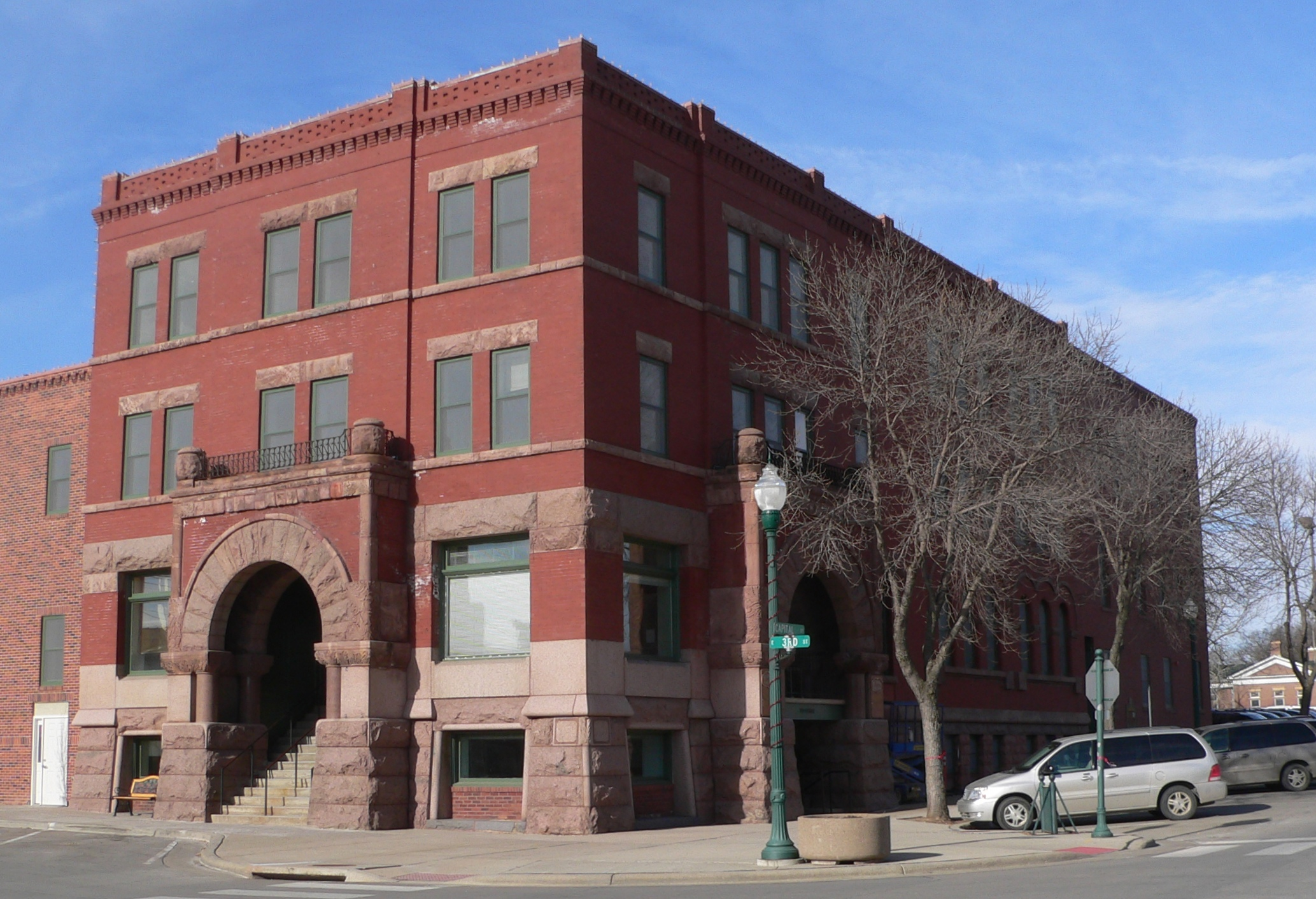
Charles Gurney Hotel

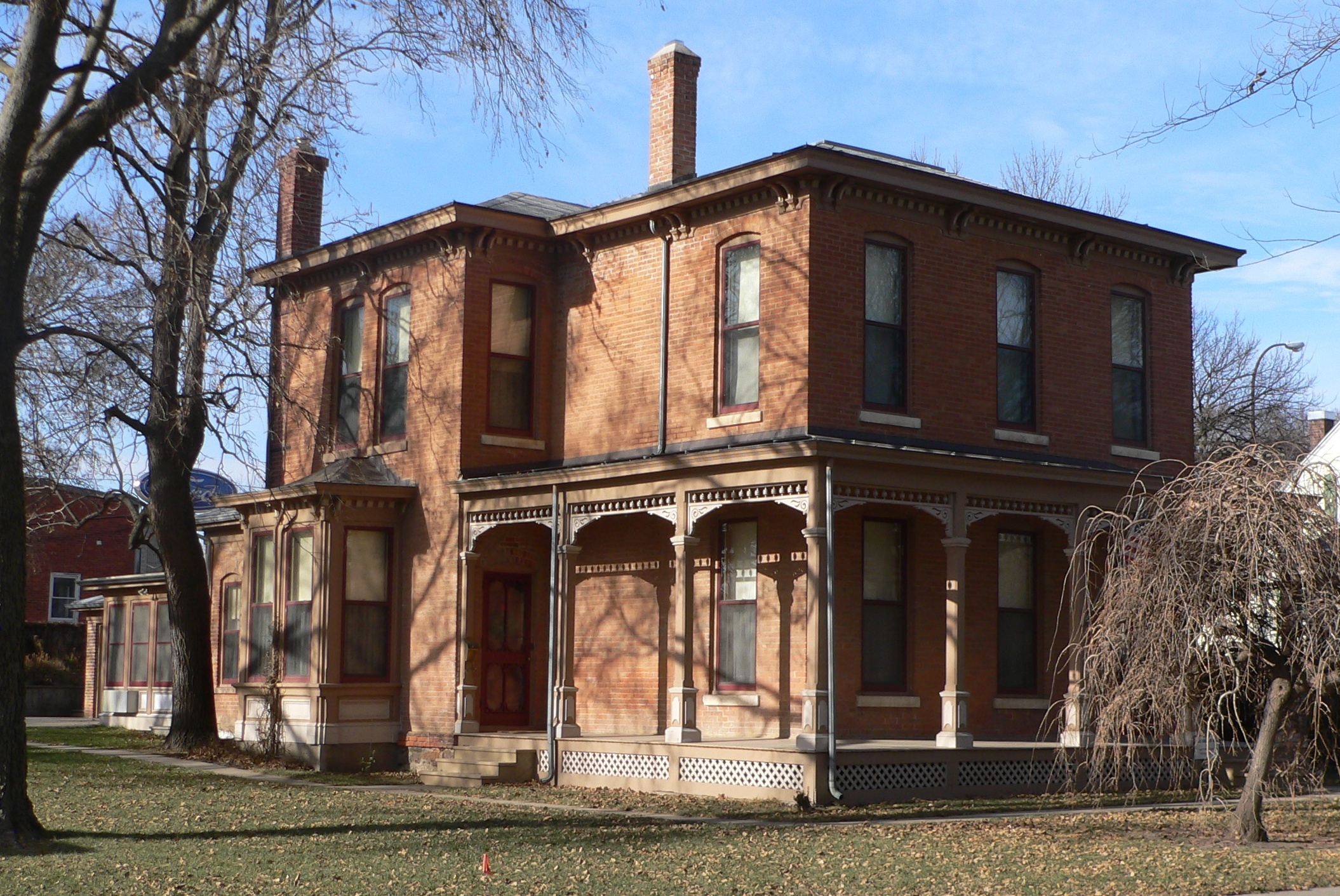
Bruce-Donaldson House

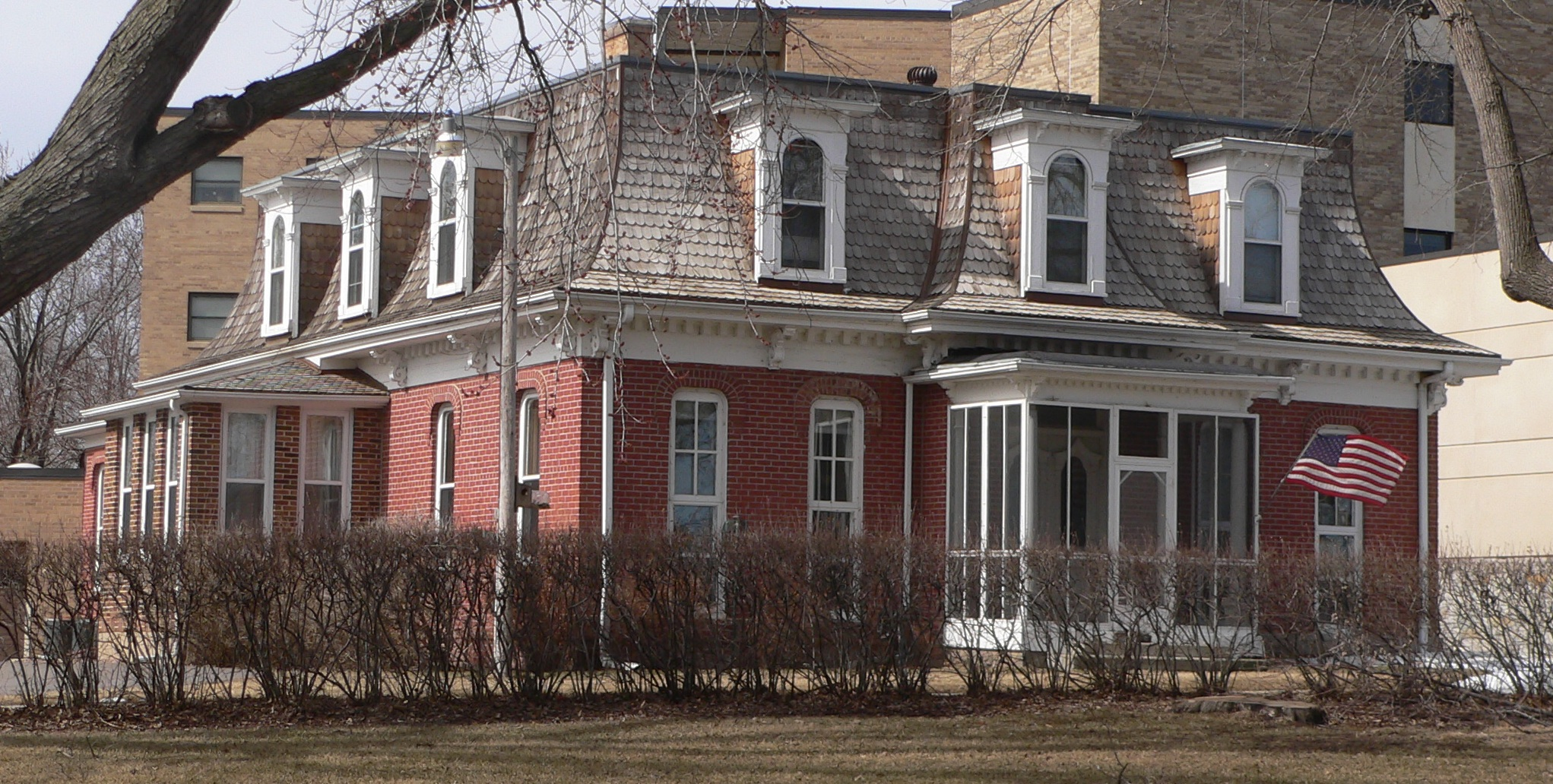
Bishop Marty House

As evidence of its rich historical past, Yankton has 26 individual properties and 6 historic districts within the city listed on the National Register of Historic Places, maintained by the U.S. National Park Service. Each individual district contains several structures, and include:

- the Yankton (residential) Historic District,
- the Yankton College Historic District (used as a prison),
- the Yankton High School Historic District,
- the Yankton Historic Commercial District
- the House of Gurney Historic District, and
- the South Dakota Human Services Center campus.

== Government ==
Yankton is governed by the City Commission, under a Council-Manager form of Local Government. The City Commission is responsible for legislative functions such as establishing policy, passing local ordinances, and voting appropriations. The City Commission appoints the City Manager to oversee the administrative operations, implement its policies, and advise the commission. The manager position is similar to that of corporate chief executive officer (CEO), providing professional management to the board of directors. There are nine Commissioners that are elected by the citizens, and the mayor is elected by the commission. As of 2025 the mayor is Mason Schramm.

Yankton Police Department
- Patch of the Yankton Police Department
- Abbreviation: YPD

Jurisdictional structure
- Governing body: Yankton City Commission
- General nature: Local civilian police

Operational structure
- Headquarters: Yankton Public Safety Center; 410 Walnut St., Yankton, South Dakota 57078
- Police Officers: 29
- Agency executive: John Harris (Aug 2018 - present), Chief of police

Website
- Yankton Police Department

The Yankton Police Department provides law enforcement for the city's residents. In 2006 it employed 29 sworn personnel.

== Education ==
Yankton is served by the Yankton Public School District (K-12), Sacred Heart Catholic School (pK-8), and Mount Marty College.

Yankton was once home to Yankton College; founded in 1881, it was the first liberal arts college in the Dakota Territory. The college closed in 1984. The campus was acquired by the Federal Bureau of Prisons in 1988 for use as the Federal Prison Camp – Yankton.

The Yankton School District has a variety of extracurricular activities including athletics and non-athletics. The athletic teams are universal on all levels of education including the Yankton Middle School and the Yankton High School. The boys' athletic teams are known as the Yankton Bucks and the girls' teams are known as the Yankton Gazelles. Yankton's debate team is the host of the annual Lewis and Clark Debate Tournament, held on the last weekend of the month of January.

Yankton is home to Mount Marty University, a private Benedictine Catholic institution of higher learning. Mounty Marty College Academy was founded in 1922 and subsequently changed their name to Mount Marty College in 1951 when they became a four-year, baccalaureate degree granting institution. The most recent change was the addition of doctoral programs and a transition to Mount Marty University in 2020. Mount Marty University athletes are known as the Lancers and compete in the National Association of Intercollegiate Athletics.

== Recreation ==
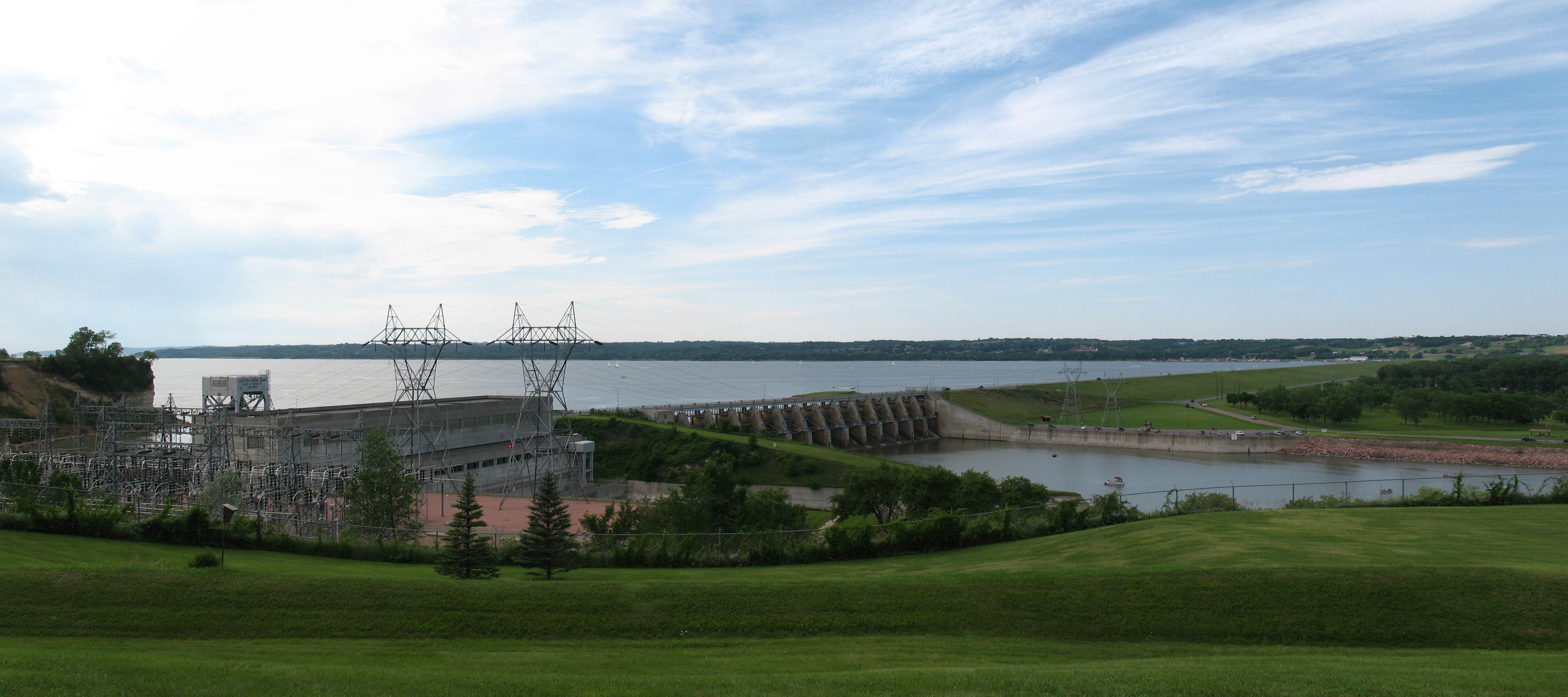
Gavins Point Dam, constructed from 1952 to 1957 (foreground) with Lewis and Clark Lake in the background, just west of Yankton.

The City of Yankton maintains fourteen municipal parks, including Fantle Memorial Park, which is the location of an outdoor public swimming pool, and Riverside Park, which is home to the city's Riverside Baseball Field. There are two golf courses in the city: the Fox Run municipal golf course, and the private golf course located at Hillcrest Golf and Country Club. The City of Yankton and the Yankton School District jointly maintain and operate the Yankton High School and Summit Activities Center; this facility offers an indoor swimming pool, several gymnasiums, and a public weight lifting room.

The double-decker Meridian Bridge over the Missouri River was decommissioned for traffic in October 2008 after the new Discovery Highway Bridge was opened. This old bridge was converted to a pedestrian bridge (photo), and is part of the city's extensive pedestrian and bicycle path system. The Brokaw-Auld Trail is a linear park and recreational path along Marne Creek, and the State of South Dakota has developed trails and paths to and throughout the Lewis and Clark Recreation Area.

Four miles west of Yankton, Lewis and Clark Lake attracts over 1.5 million visitors per year. The Lewis and Clark State Recreation Area, extending approximately two miles along the north shore of Lewis and Clark Lake, offering camping, swimming, hiking/biking trails, and boating facilities. The Lewis and Clark Resort and Marina is located within the park and offers cabin rentals, marina slips, convenience store, and a waterfront restaurant. The U.S. Army Corps of Engineers also maintains public recreation areas along the Missouri River just downstream of Gavins Point Dam.

== Transportation ==
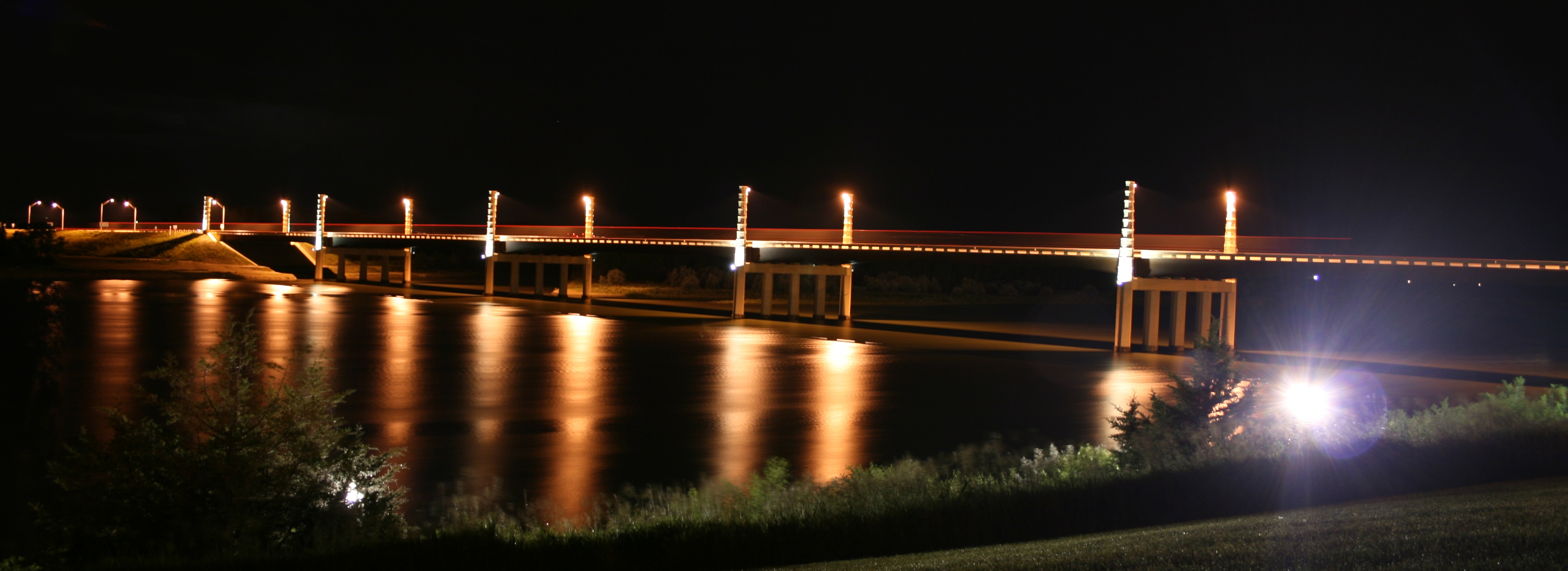
The Discovery Bridge at night.

Air transportation is provided by the Chan Gurney Municipal Airport, owned by the City of Yankton; however, the nearest airports with commercial flights are Sioux Falls Regional Airport in Sioux Falls and Sioux Gateway Airport in Sioux City, Iowa.

U.S. Route 81 serves the city as a north–south highway that connects the city with Nebraska across the Missouri River to the south via the Discovery Bridge, which replaced the Historic Meridian Highway Bridge in 2008. Interstate 90 is approximately 65 miles north of the city, and Interstate 80 is about 160 miles south of the city, via U.S. Route 81. U.S. Route 81 is also signed as Broadway Avenue within city limits.

South Dakota Highway 50 serves the city as an east–west highway and includes a four-lane divided highway that connects the city to Interstate 29, approximately 33 miles to the east.

South Dakota Highway 52 connects the city to the Lewis and Clark Lake area, about four miles to the west.

== Media ==
=== Print ===
The Yankton Daily Press & Dakotan is a daily newspaper published in the city with origins dating back to 1861.

=== Radio ===
Broadcasting in Yankton began in 1922 when WNAX radio went on the air. Today, two AM radio stations and two commercial FM stations are licensed to Yankton:

==== AM radio ====
- 570 WNAX: Talk radio
- 1450 KYNT: Soft adult contemporary
- 1570 KVTK: ESPN Radio

==== FM radio ====
- 89.7 KUSD: Public radio/NPR
- 93.1 KKYA: Country music
- 94.3 KDAM: Hot adult contemporary
- 104.1 WNAX-FM: Country music
- 106.3 KVHT: Classic hits

Several low-power non-commercial FM stations are licensed to Yankton.

=== Television ===
There are no commercial television stations based in Yankton. Stations from Sioux Falls and Sioux City serve Yankton. One Sioux Falls station, KTTW (digital channel 7), is rebroadcast on analog channel 21 in Yankton.

== Culture ==
Dakota Theater, Yankton, 1987

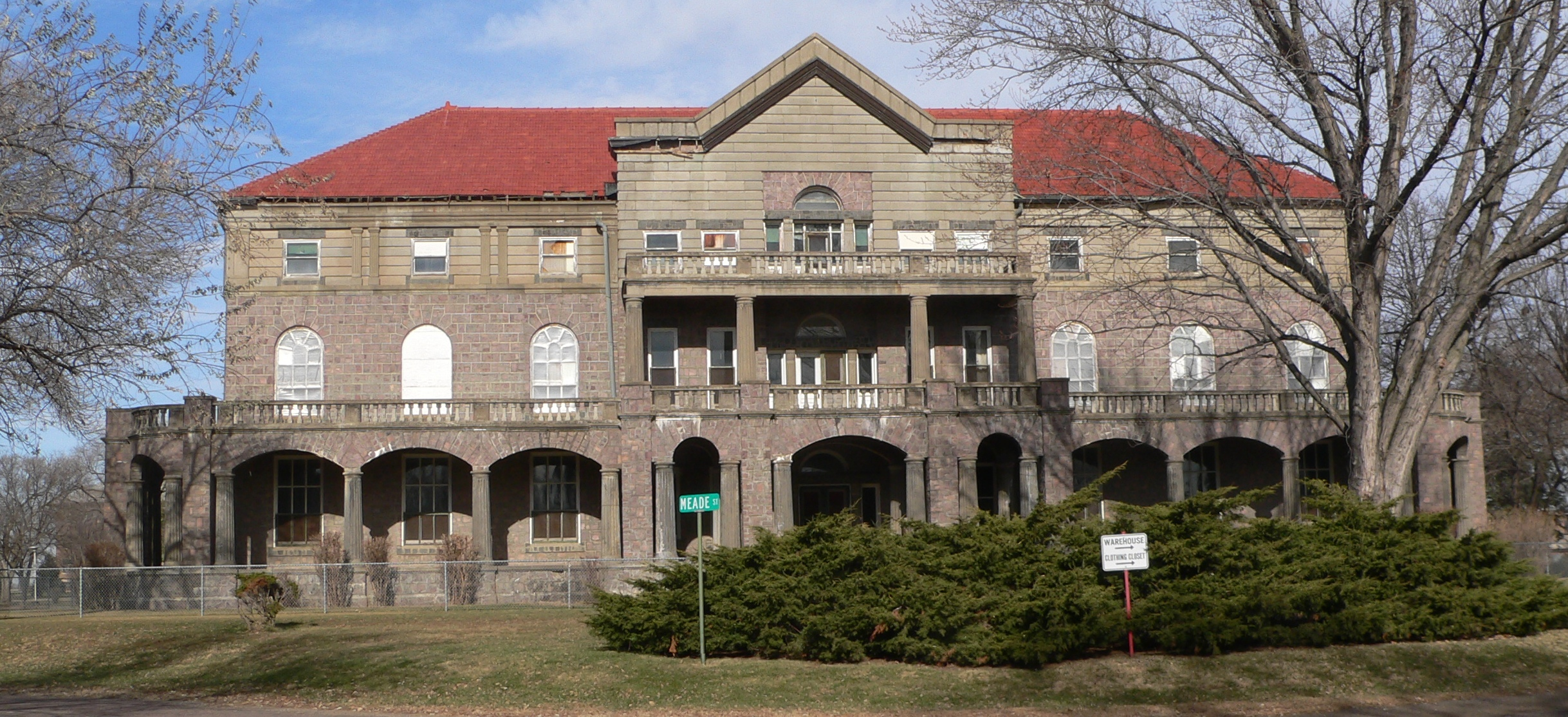
The abandoned Mead Building on the South Dakota Human Services Center campus in Yankton has been identified as the future site of the Dakota Territorial Museum.

Mount Marty University offers several cultural assets and venues in Yankton, including the Bede Art Gallery, which showcases artwork from regional and Native American artists, as well as Marian Auditorium, which hosts performing and fine art events. The college is also home to Great Plains Writers' Tour, which brings award-winning professional writers to campus for readings and class workshops. Previous authors include former United States poet laureate Ted Kooser, American Book Award winner Maria Mazziotti Gillan, Elizabeth Cook-Lynn, David Lee, and William Kloefkorn, among others.

Yankton is also home to the Dakota Territorial Museum, which is housed in the newly restored Mead Cultural Education Building on the campus of the Human Services Center in north Yankton. The collection contains information and artifacts about the heritage and development of the City of Yankton and the surrounding area. The museum's collection includes artifacts of Dakota Territory, Native American inhabitants, and early pioneers. The museum complex also contains several outbuildings, such as a restored rural school house and the Great Northern Railway Depot which will be moved to the new location at 82 Mickelson Drive in the latter part of 2019. The museum also displays a retired Burlington Northern Railway caboose.

Yankton's Riverboat Days is an annual celebration held in the third full weekend in August. The primarily free event attracts 135,000 people and hosts over 150 artists and over 50 food vendors at Riverside Park. Other activities include a rodeo, parade, golf tournament, and snowmobile grass drag race.

== Sports ==
The National Field Archery Association, NFAA, moved its headquarters from Redland, California to Yankton, South Dakota.

=== Special sporting events ===
The National Field Archery Association's Easton Yankton Archery Complex hosted nearly 600 archers from 51 countries for the 2015 World Archery Youth Championships.

== Contemporary culture ==
=== Games ===
- Yankton is a Native American settlement featured in the video game Empire: Total War.
- One of the fictional U.S. states featured in the 2013 Rockstar Games title Grand Theft Auto V is called North Yankton, named after both the city and county. However, the real U.S. state it's based on is North Dakota, as opposed to Yankton's actual home of South Dakota.

=== Television ===
- Yankton is mentioned numerous times as the territorial capital in the western TV series Deadwood.
- Yankton is mentioned in The Middle episode, "Hecks on a Train" (2015).
- * Yankton was the location of the first-ever viewer call-in to C-SPAN on October 7, 1980.

== Notable people ==
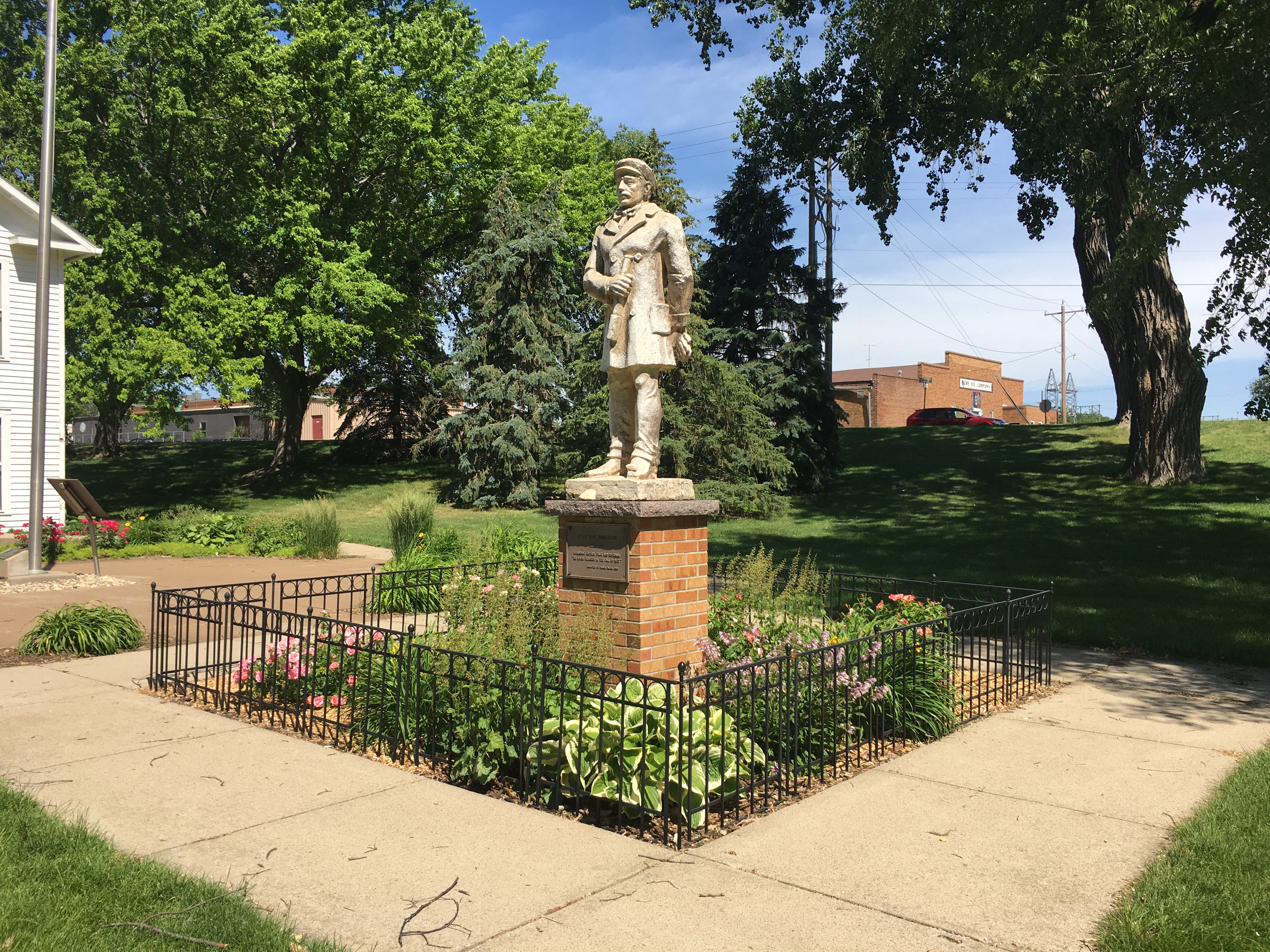
Statue of steamboat captain Grant Marsh in Riverside Park, Yankton, South Dakota.

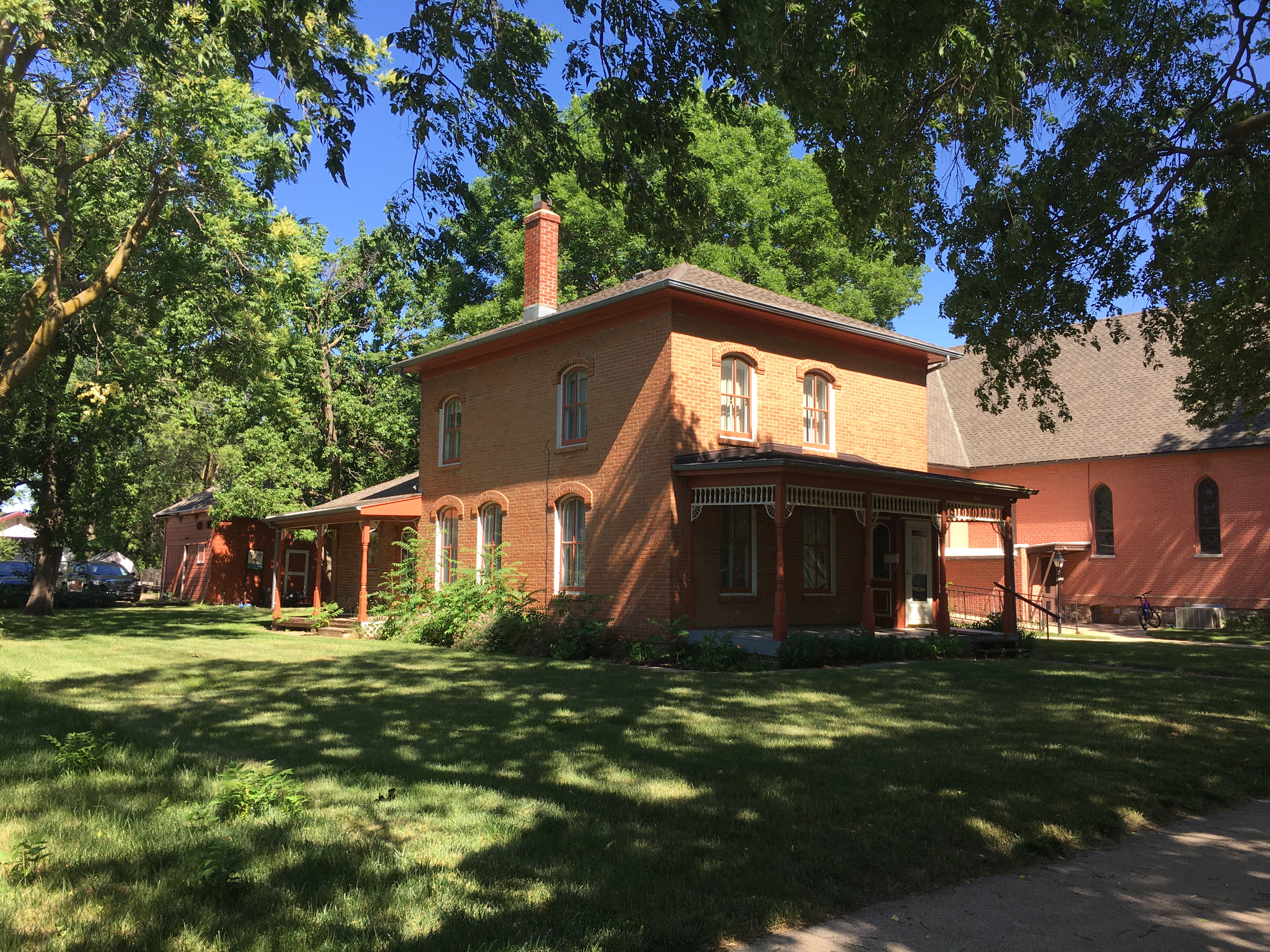
Home and barn of Grant Marsh, 513 Douglas St., Yankton, South Dakota. Marsh was the most famous steamboat captain on the Missouri River.

- Lyle Alzado, NFL player, played college football at Yankton College
- General William H. H. Beadle, Surveyor General of Dakota Territory
- Ted Blakey, American businessman, activist, and historian
- Tom Brokaw, former NBC anchorman and native of Pickstown, South Dakota
- Amy Ellerman, contralto and voice teacher
- Abner S. Flagg, Wisconsin State Assemblyman
- Ralph A. Gamble, former US Congressman
- John Chandler "Chan" Gurney, served as United States Senator from South Dakota 1939 - 1951
- Colton Iverson, basketball player, Colorado State University, NBA Boston Celtics
- William A. Jayne,first governor of Dakota Territory, 1861–1863
- Dave Koehler, Illinois State Senator
- Grant Marsh, record-setting steamboat captain
- Maury Nipp, NFL player
- Layne Somsen, baseball pitcher, South Dakota State University
- Wynn Speece, WNAX radio personality (Neighbor Lady)
- Adam Vinatieri, NFL placekicker and Hall of Famer, born in Yankton
- Joseph Ward, educator and founder of Yankton College
- Robert H. Warren, fourth superintendent of the United States Air Force Academy
- Lawrence Welk, bandleader and native of Strasburg, North Dakota
- Stephanie Winslow, singer
- Chief Pa-le-ne-a-pa-pe ("Struck by the Ree" or "Strikes the Ree"), Yankton Sioux (Western Dakota) Tribe

== See also ==
- Federal Prison Camp, Yankton
- Gavins Point Dam
- Human Services Center
- Lewis and Clark Lake
- Missouri National Recreational River
- Mount Marty College
- National Register of Historic Places listings in Yankton County, South Dakota
- Yankton College
