= WNAX-FM =

Radio station in Yankton, South Dakota

Coordinates: 42.640°N 97.056°W

- Yankton, South Dakota; United States
- Broadcast area: Vermillion; Sioux City; Sioux Falls; Norfolk
- Frequency: 104.1 MHz (HD Radio)
- Branding: The Wolf 104.1

Programming
- Format: Country
- Subchannels: HD2: 99.9 & 104.5 The Outlaw (classic country)
- Affiliations: Westwood One

Ownership
- Owner: Saga Communications; (Saga Communications of South Dakota, LLC)
- Sister stations: WNAX

History
- First air date: August 9, 1973
- Former call signs: KQHU (1973–1990); KBCM (1990–1991); WNAX-FM (1991–1998); KMXH (1998); KCLH (1998–2000)

Technical information
- Facility ID: 57839
- Class: C1
- ERP: 100,000 watts
- HAAT: 299 meters (981 ft)
- Translators: HD2: 99.9 K260BO (Yankton); HD2: 104.5 K283AG (Sioux City)

Links
- Webcast: Listen live
- Website: www.1041thewolf.com; legendsandyoungguns.com (HD2)

WNAX-FM (104.1 MHz, "The Wolf") is a radio station broadcasting a country format. Licensed to Yankton, South Dakota, United States, it serves the Vermillion, and Sioux City areas. The station is owned by Saga Communications.

== History ==
The station's original construction permit was granted to Oyate, Inc. on March 16, 1973; the call sign KQHU was issued on April 20, and the station signed on August 9. KQHU was formally licensed on June 11, 1974. In its early years, KQHU programmed popular standards and beautiful music; by 1976, it had pivoted to a blend of top 40 and oldies and was affiliated with the ABC Contemporary Network. The station evolved to adult contemporary by 1984.

Following regulatory issues with the Federal Communications Commission (FCC) regarding Oyate's ownership (which resulted in the FCC initiating license revocation proceedings), as well as the bankruptcy of Oyate, KQHU was sold to Flagship Communications for $599,000 in 1988. Flagship's principal owner, Lawrence S. Magnuson, already held an interest in KSCJ in Sioux City, Iowa; that station would come under the Flagship banner in 1989. KQHU's call sign was changed to KBCM on August 20, 1990.

Flagship Communications sold KBCM, which had become a country music station, to Park Communications for $675,000 in 1991; the deal, which paired the station with WNAX, was required because of Flagship's concurrent purchase of KSUX in Winnebago, Nebraska. Park renamed the station WNAX-FM on November 20, 1991, and changed its format to oldies. Saga Communications purchased the WNAX stations from Park for $7 million in 1996.

WNAX-FM changed its call sign to KMXH on September 1, 1998; it then became KCLH on September 25, coinciding with a format shift to classic hits and the addition of Bob & Tom. Though the format was successful in the Sioux City radio ratings and had no issues in attracting advertisers, financial considerations led KCLH to begin simulcasting WNAX's full service blend of news, farm information, and country music on August 21, 2000; also carried were some sports programming and Bill Mack. The WNAX-FM call sign returned on August 30. By 2001, while still simulcasting WNAX in morning drive, WNAX-FM had moved to a full-time country music format the remainder of the day. In June 2007, the station rebranded from "Big Country 104-1" to "The Wolf 104.1".

== HD Radio ==
On August 31, 2018, WNAX-FM launched a second country format, utilizing Saga's "Outlaw" classic country branding, on its HD2 subchannel. The subchannel is branded "99.9 & 104.5 The Outlaw" to reflect its simulcasts on translator stations K260BO (99.9 FM) in Yankton, South Dakota (which previously simulcast WNAX), and K283AG (104.5 FM) in Sioux City (which had previously served as a translator for WNAX-FM's primary programming).
