= KYNT =

- Yankton, South Dakota; United States
- Frequency: 1450 kHz
- Branding: KYNT FM 102.1 AM 1450

Programming
- Format: Soft adult contemporary

Ownership
- Owner: Riverfront Broadcasting LLC; (Riverfront Broadcasting LLC)
- Sister stations: KKYA

History
- First air date: 1955
- Call sign meaning: Yankton

Technical information
- Licensing authority: FCC
- Facility ID: 60857
- Class: C
- Power: 1,000 watts (unlimited)
- Transmitter coordinates: 42°53′30″N 97°25′10″W
- Translator: 102.1 K271CW (Yankton)

Links
- Public license information: Public file; LMS
- Webcast: Listen live
- Website: kynt1450.com

KYNT (1450 AM, "Radio 1450") is a radio station licensed to serve Yankton, South Dakota. The station is owned and licensed by Riverfront Broadcasting LLC It airs a soft adult contemporary formats. KYNT broadcasts games for the Yankton Bucks and Gazelles, including football, basketball, and wrestling.

== History ==
KYNT began its broadcasting career on March 15, 1955, after being authorized by the Federal Communications Commission (FCC) in January of that year. The station was founded by the Yankton Broadcasting Company, led by real estate developer William M. Smith. Its call letters were chosen to represent the city of "YaNkTon." Notably, legendary news anchor Tom Brokaw worked at KYNT during his high school years in the mid-1950s. In 1960, the station was sold to Leon T. Scoblic and Lloyd G. Reedstrom, who moved all operations to the transmitter site on North Highway 81. Over the decades, KYNT has transitioned through several formats, including "Middle-Of-The-Road" (MOR) and Contemporary, eventually settling into its long-standing role as a full-service community station. In 2008, the station was acquired by Riverfront Broadcasting LLC, owned by Doyle and Carolyn Becker.

Logo before translator sign on

== Ownership ==
In February 2008, Riverfront Broadcasting LLC reached an agreement with NRG Media to purchase this station as part of a six station deal.
