= Wynn Speece =

US radio personality (1917–2007)

- Born: 1917; Marshalltown, Iowa; United States
- Died: October 22, 2007 (aged 90); Yankton, South Dakota; United States
- Presenting career
- Show: The Neighbor Lady
- Station: WNAX (AM)
- Style: Radio personality
- Country: United States

Winifred (Wynn) Hubler Speece (1917–2007) was the "Neighbor Lady" on WNAX (AM) radio for 64 years from 1941 to 2005. Speece began working at WNAX in 1939 shortly after graduating from Drake University with a degree in theater. As the "Neighbor Lady", Speece shared recipes, household tips, and personal anecdotes during her weekday program. At the height of her fame in the 1940s and 1950s, she received over 250,000 letters a year.

WNAX published "Ten Years with Your Neighbor Lady", a collection of recipes, tips, and letters from listeners, in 1954. Speece received a Marconi Radio Award in 1992.
