= KVTK (AM) =

ESPN Radio affiliate in Vermillion, South Dakota, United States

- Vermillion, South Dakota; United States
- Frequency: 1570 kHz
- Branding: ESPN Radio 1570

Programming
- Format: Sports
- Affiliations: ESPN Radio; Infinity Sports Network; Westwood One; Minnesota Lynx; Minnesota Timberwolves; Minnesota Wild

Ownership
- Owner: Five Star Communications
- Sister stations: KVHT

History
- First air date: 1967
- Former call signs: KVRA (1967–1990); KOSZ (1990–2000)

Technical information
- Licensing authority: FCC
- Facility ID: 14709
- Class: D
- Power: 500 watts day 71 watts night
- Transmitter coordinates: 42°55′22″N 97°03′58″W
- Translator: 101.5 K268DP (Vermillion)

Links
- Public license information: Public file; LMS
- Webcast: Listen Live
- Website: kvtk.com

KVTK (1570 kHz, "ESPN Radio 1570") is an AM radio station broadcasting a sports talk format. Licensed to Vermillion, South Dakota, United States. The station is currently owned by 5 Star Communications, Inc. KVTK is affiliated with the ESPN Radio network, the Infinity Sports Network, the Westwood One network, the Minnesota Lynx, the Minnesota Timberwolves and the Minnesota Wild.

The Station also airs Vermillion High School events and select University of South Dakota women's basketball games. The station moved location to now be broadcasting from Westreville which is well to the North West of the town. In the early 2000s, KVTK served as the flagship station for the University of South Dakota (USD) Coyote Sports Network, providing play-by-play coverage for football and basketball.

== History ==
KVTK first began broadcasting in 1967 under the call sign KVRA. For much of its early history, the station served the local community as a general service outlet. On April 16, 1990, the station underwent a rebranding and changed its call letters to KOSZ, a designation it held for a decade. On April 4, 2000, the station adopted its current KVTK call letters and transitioned to a sports-oriented format. The station is currently owned by 5 Star Communications, Inc., which acquired the station to complement its regional cluster, including sister station KVHT.

== Honors and awards ==
In May 2006, KVTK won one first place plaque in the commercial radio division of the South Dakota Associated Press Broadcasters Association news contest. The contest was for the 2005 calendar year.
