= WNAX (AM) =

Radio station in Yankton, South Dakota

Coordinates: 42°54′47″N 97°18′58″W

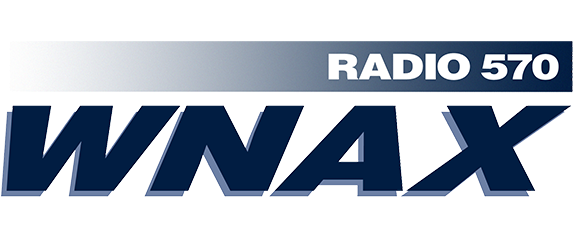
- Yankton, South Dakota; United States
- Broadcast area: South Dakota; Northwest Iowa; Southwest Minnesota; Southeast North Dakota; Eastern Nebraska
- Frequency: 570 kHz
- Branding: WNAX Radio 570

Programming
- Format: News/talk
- Network: Fox News Radio
- Affiliations: CBS News Radio; Compass Media Networks; Minnesota Twins Radio Network; Minnesota Vikings Radio Network; Premiere Networks; South Dakota State Jackrabbits Radio Network; Westwood One

Ownership
- Owner: Saga Communications; (Saga Communications of South Dakota, LLC)
- Sister stations: WNAX-FM

History
- First air date: November 7, 1922
- Call sign meaning: None (sequentially assigned) (Note: Other new stations granted during the month of November 1922 included WNAQ, Charleston, South Carolina; WNAV, Knoxville, Tennessee; WNAW, Fort Monroe, Virginia; and WNAY, Baltimore, Maryland. (A fanciful folk etymology later developed that WNAX's call letters stood for "North American radio eXperiment".))

Technical information
- Licensing authority: FCC
- Facility ID: 57846
- Class: B
- Power: 5,000 watts
- Translator: 96.9 K245DA (Yankton)

Links
- Public license information: Public file; LMS
- Webcast: Listen live
- Website: www.wnax.com

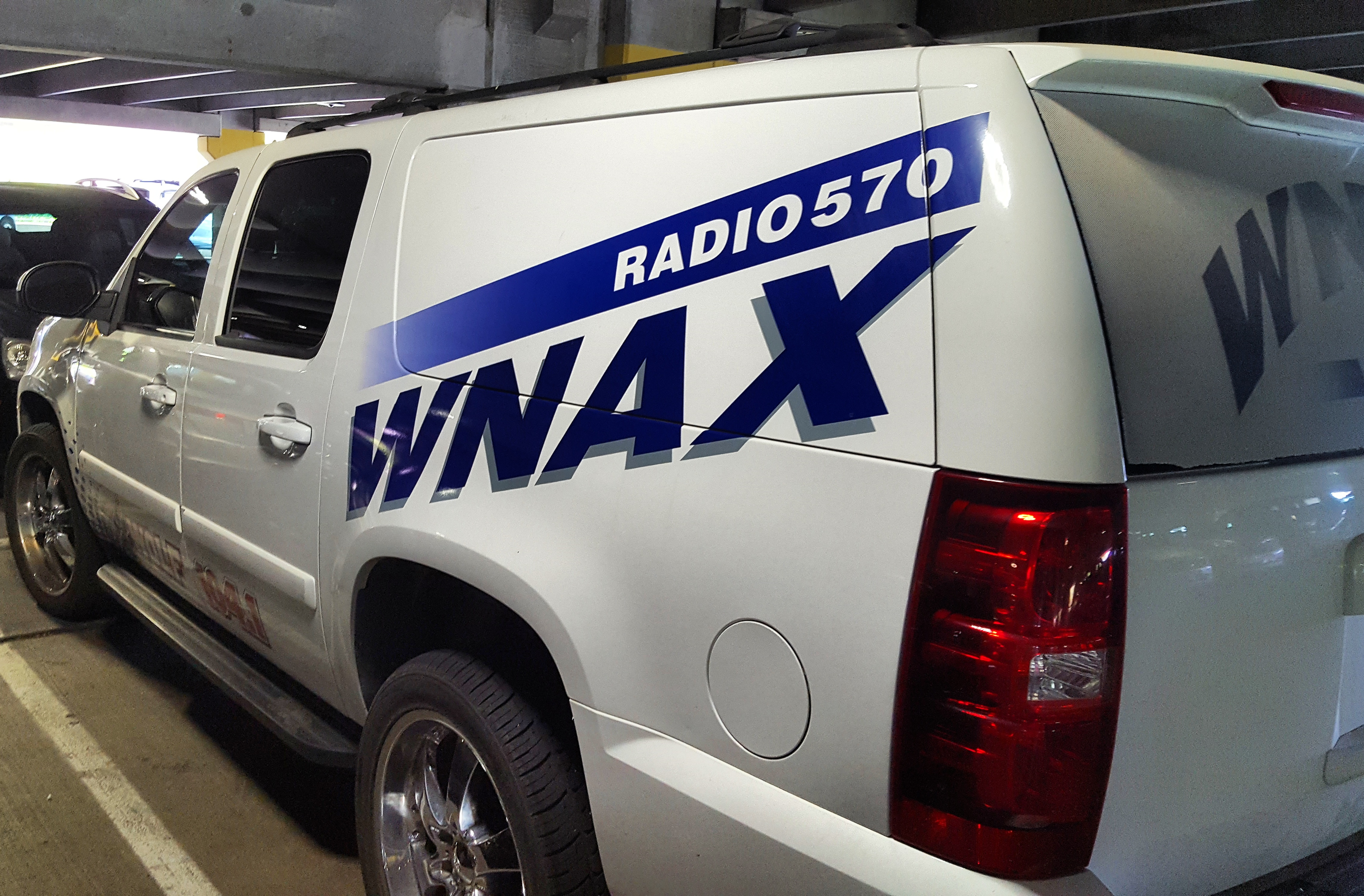
A vehicle for WNAX radio 570 Yankton, South Dakota, as seen at the Mall of America in Bloomington, Minnesota.

WNAX (570 AM) is a commercial radio station in Yankton, South Dakota, United States. It is owned by Saga Communications, with studios on East State Highway 50 in Yankton. It airs a full service radio format including news, talk, sports and farm reports.

WNAX is a Class B station, powered at 5,000 watts. By day, it is non-directional. At night, to protect other stations on 570 AM from interference, it uses a directional antenna with a three-tower array. The transmitter is on 444th Avenue in Mission Hill, South Dakota. Programming is also heard on FM translator K245DA at 96.9 MHz in Yankton.

== Programming ==
WNAX airs a mix of local shows and nationally syndicated programs. Weekday mornings begin with The WNAX Early Morning Get-Together with Big Scott Allen. It includes local news, agriculture reports and updates from CBS News Radio. The rest of the weekday schedule features news, ag reports and local talk. At 6pm, the station switches to Fox Sports Radio. At midnight, WNAX carries Coast to Coast AM with George Noory. Before dawn, it airs This Morning, America's First News with Gordon Deal.

Weekends feature specialty shows on money, health, travel, gardening, car repair, home repair and technology. Syndicated weekend shows include Eye on Travel with Peter Greenberg, Jill on Money with Jill Schlesinger, CBS News Weekend Roundup, The Takeout with Major Garrett, Rich DeMuro on Tech, Face The Nation and Meet The Press. Most hours begin with an update from CBS News Radio. Sunday mornings feature religious shows and Sunday evenings carry Fox Sports Radio.

In addition, WNAX is the flagship station for South Dakota State University sports. It also carries Minnesota Twins baseball, Minnesota Timberwolves basketball and Minnesota Vikings football.

== History ==
=== Gurney's Seed and Nursery ===
WNAX was first licensed on November 7, 1922, to the Dakota Radio Apparatus company. It is the oldest surviving radio station in the state of South Dakota. The call sign came from a sequentially assigned list. WNAX was the last AM station in the state to receive a call sign starting with a W instead of K; all subsequent AM stations in the state were established after the January 1923 shift that moved the K/W call letter boundary from the western border of South Dakota to the Mississippi River.

WNAX was purchased by Gurney's Seed and Nursery Company in 1926 and became known as "WNAX—-Voice of the House of Gurney in Yankton". The station was used to promote Gurney products and services, making Gurney's a household name.

On February 10, 1933, the Federal Radio Commission authorized an increase in daytime power from 1,000 watts to 2,500 watts. Less than two years later, December 18, 1934, the new Federal Communications Commission (FCC) authorized another increase in power, to the current 5,000 watts.

=== Popular shows ===
The radio station launched the careers of many stars, both local and national. Starting in the late 1920s, orchestra leader Lawrence Welk spent a decade performing daily without pay on WNAX. In 1939, Wynn Hubler Speece started her radio program and became known regionally as "Your Neighbor Lady". Speece was still continuing to do her Marconi Award-winning broadcast more than sixty years later when WNAX celebrated its eightieth anniversary in 2002. In October 2005, Speece announced her retirement after almost 66 years of continuous broadcasting. She died on October 22, 2007, at 90 years of age.

Other well-known regional radio personalities from WNAX have included Norm Hilson, Whitney Larson, "Happy" Jack O'Malley, Bob Hill, Ed Nelson, Jerry Oster, Carl Thoreson, Steve (Mike) Wallick, George B. German, Roland "Pete" Peterson and the hillbilly performers on the WNAX Missouri Valley Barn Dance show.

=== New owner ===
Gurney's sold WNAX for $200,000 to Gardner Cowles Jr.'s South Dakota Broadcasting Corporation in 1938. The station joined Cowles media holdings that also included The Des Moines Register & Tribune, KSO and KRNT in Des Moines, Iowa, and WMT in Cedar Rapids, Iowa.

In 1942 the station built a tower in Yankton at a height of 929 feet (283 m). It was the tallest radio broadcasting tower at the time. The current tower is 911 feet (278 m) tall.

=== Blue Network ===
In December 1944, the Blue Network announced that WNAX, along with Cowles sister stations KRNT in Des Moines and WCOP in Boston, would be among six new affiliate, effective June 15, 1945. The affiliation change coincided with the network's rebranding as the American Broadcasting Company (ABC). Prior to this affiliation, WNAX had been a CBS Radio affiliate. Concurrently with the termination of WCOP's ABC affiliation on June 15, 1951, WNAX and KRNT would also leave ABC and rejoin CBS.

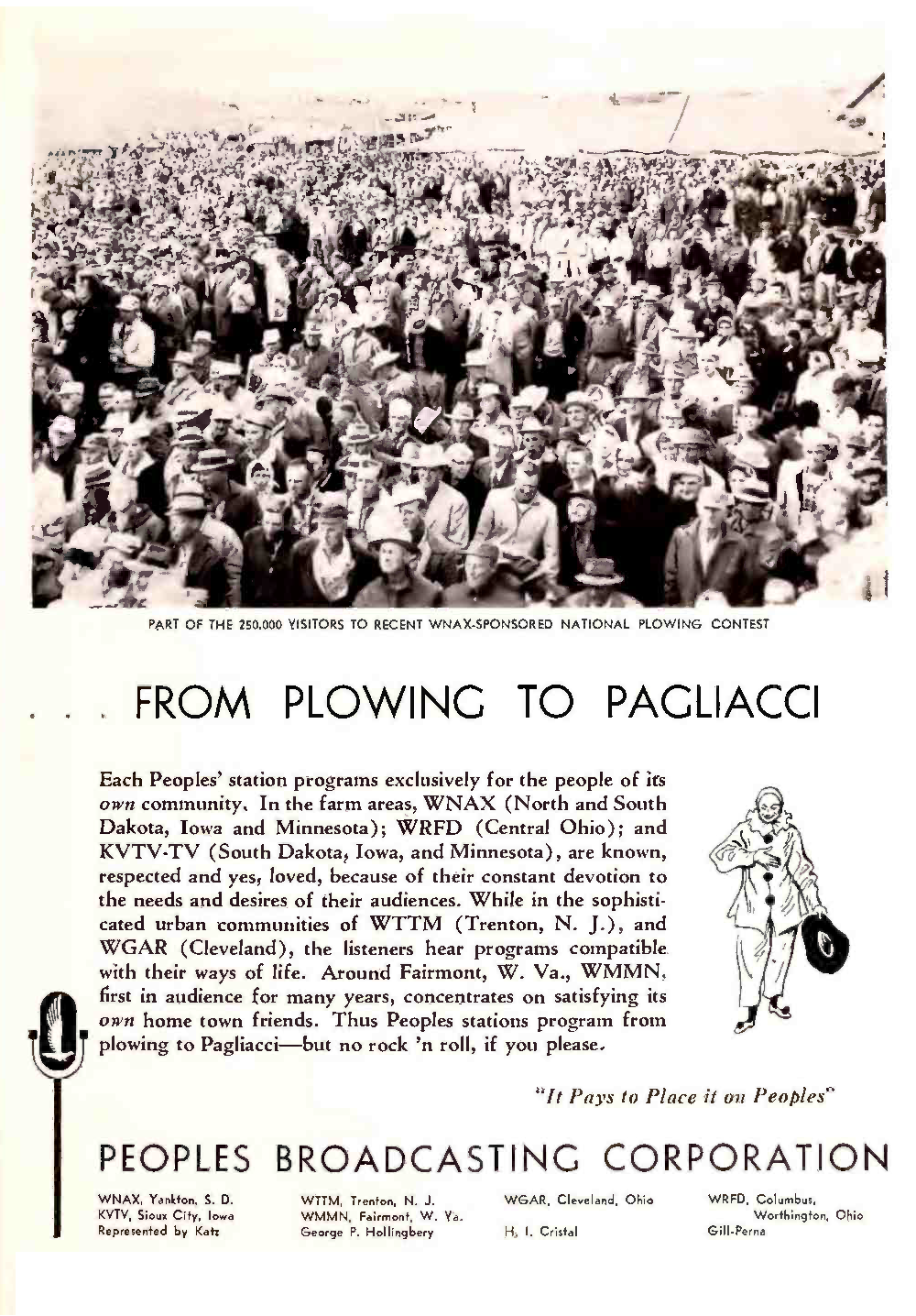
1960 advertisement for Peoples Broadcasting Corporation, later known as Nationwide Communications Corporation, a subsidiary of the Nationwide Mutual Insurance Co. (Note the Nationwide "eagle" logo inside the Peoples microphone logo.)

In 1957, Cowles Broadcasting Corporation sold the station, along with co-owned television station KVTV (now KCAU-TV) in Sioux City, Iowa, for $3 million. The new owner was Peoples Broadcasting Corporation, a subsidiary of Nationwide Mutual Insurance Co., which, in turn, was an affiliate of the Ohio Farm Bureau Federation. Peoples sold WNAX to Red Owl Stores for $1.5 million in 1965. Control of Red Owl was acquired by Gamble-Skogmo in 1967; the transfer occurred before seeking FCC approval, and in 1968 the commission ordered Red Owl to sell its stations. WNAX, along with WEBC in Duluth, Minnesota, and KRSI AM-FM in St. Louis Park, Minnesota, was then acquired by Park Broadcasting in a $2.9 million deal announced that July.

In December 1983, a fire destroyed the main WNAX building. All of the station's historic live recordings as well as thousands of records were destroyed. The staff of WNAX went to the station's transmitter site and continued broadcasting. Eventually, the station recovered when a new building was constructed on Highway 50 in Yankton.

In 1991, Park also acquired KCBM, an FM station in Yankton at 104.1 MHz. The FM sister station would be renamed WNAX-FM.

=== Saga Communications ===
In 1996, Saga Communications purchased WNAX and WNAX-FM from Park Communications for $7 million. Programming from One on One Sports was added to WNAX's full service format in January 1997.

In 2002, Saga dropped the limited country music played during WNAX's daytime news and farm information programming, and replaced evening carriage of Sporting News Radio (the former One on One Sports) with syndicated talk shows.

Today, WNAX continues many of the traditions started in 1922 with frequent news, sports, weather and farm market updates. The station continues to be affiliated with CBS News Radio, an association that began in the late 1920s, and was only interrupted by the six years with ABC Radio from 1945 to 1951.

== Signal ==
WNAX's 5,000-watt signal provides unusually large daytime coverage. It provides at least secondary coverage during the day to most of the eastern half of South Dakota, much of western Iowa, southwestern Minnesota, and most of the densely populated portion of Nebraska. In addition to its home markets of Sioux City and Sioux Falls, WNAX provides a strong grade B signal to Omaha and Lincoln. Under the right conditions, its daytime signal penetrates as far south as Kansas City, as far north as Fargo and well east of Des Moines with a good radio.

Among U.S. stations, WNAX's daytime land coverage is exceeded only by KFYR in Bismarck, North Dakota. A single tower is used during the day. Three towers are used at night to protect other stations on 570 AM and on adjacent frequencies. The nighttime signal is concentrated along the Sioux Falls-Sioux City corridor.

WNAX's signal benefits from its location near the bottom of the AM dial, as well as its transmitter power, and South Dakota's flat land (with near-perfect ground conductivity).

== Honors and awards ==
In May 2006, WNAX won one first place in the commercial radio division of the South Dakota Associated Press Broadcasters Association news contest.
