= National Register of Historic Places listings in Yankton County, South Dakota =

Location of Yankton County in South Dakota

This is a list of the National Register of Historic Places listings in Yankton County, South Dakota.

This is intended to be a complete list of the properties and districts on the National Register of Historic Places in Yankton County, South Dakota, United States. The locations of National Register properties and districts for which the latitude and longitude coordinates are included below, may be seen in a map.

There are 79 properties and districts listed on the National Register in the county. Another property was once listed but has since been removed.

This National Park Service list is complete through NPS recent listings posted August 28, 2026.

== Current listings ==
	Name on the Register	Image	Date listed	Location	City or town	Description
1	Aggergaard Manor	Aggergaard Manor	June 6, 2001 (#01000636)	Thompson St. 43°05′09″N 97°09′55″W	Irene	
2	Dr. B.M. Banton House	Dr. B.M. Banton House	October 8, 1987 (#87001729)	517 Locust St. 42°52′24″N 97°23′59″W	Yankton	
3	Bishop Marty Rectory	Bishop Marty Rectory	December 27, 1974 (#74001900)	1101 W. 5th St. 42°52′16″N 97°24′29″W	Yankton	
4	Brockmueller Barn		April 16, 1980 (#80003757)	South of Highway 46; 43°02′34″N 97°19′10″W	Volin	part of the Northern and Central Townships of Yankton Multiple Resource Area (MRA)
5	Bruce-Donaldson House	Bruce-Donaldson House	March 5, 1982 (#82003946)	313 Pine St. 42°52′14″N 97°23′20″W	Yankton	
6	Burns House	Burns House	February 9, 2001 (#01000094)	816 Pine St. 42°52′39″N 97°23′18″W	Yankton	
7	Chicago, Milwaukee and St. Paul Depot	Chicago, Milwaukee and St. Paul Depot	March 5, 1982 (#82003947)	8th and Douglas Sts. 42°52′35″N 97°23′27″W	Yankton	
8	DeJong House	DeJong House	April 16, 1980 (#80003750)	In Utica; 42°58′50″N 97°29′56″W	Utica	part of the Northern and Central Townships of Yankton MRA
9	Harold A. (H.A.) Doyle House	Harold A. (H.A.) Doyle House	October 25, 1990 (#90001645)	712 W. 3rd St. 42°52′13″N 97°24′08″W	Yankton	
10	Arthur C. Ellerman House	Arthur C. Ellerman House	March 5, 1982 (#82003948)	708 W. 5th St. 42°52′22″N 97°24′08″W	Yankton	
11	ES Volin Farmstead	ES Volin Farmstead	April 16, 1980 (#80003758)	Southeast of Volin; 42°57′07″N 97°10′22″W	Volin	part of the Northern and Central Townships of Yankton MRA
12	Excelsior Flour Mill	Excelsior Flour Mill	November 7, 1976 (#76001757)	106 Capital Street; 42°52′04″N 97°23′25″W	Yankton	
13	William J. Fantle House	William J. Fantle House	October 10, 1989 (#89001588)	1201 Douglas; 42°52′57″N 97°23′31″W	Yankton	
14	Gordon House		April 16, 1980 (#80003736)	North of Highway 46; 43°06′03″N 97°19′13″W	Irene	part of the Northern and Central Townships of Yankton MRA
15	Gorsett Farmstead	Gorsett Farmstead	April 16, 1980 (#80003759)	North of Volin; 42°58′56″N 97°11′11″W	Volin	part of the Northern and Central Townships of Yankton MRA
16	Endre B. Gunderson Farmstead		April 16, 1980 (#80003769)	North of Yankton; 42°56′11″N 97°24′59″W	Yankton	part of the Northern and Central Townships of Yankton MRA
17	Charles Gurney Hotel	Charles Gurney Hotel	August 3, 1979 (#79002410)	3rd and Capital Sts. 42°52′12″N 97°23′26″W	Yankton	
18	Bernt Gustad House		April 16, 1980 (#80003760)	Northwest of Volin; 42°58′10″N 97°20′13″W	Volin	part of the Northern and Central Townships of Yankton MRA
19	Henjna Farmstead	Henjna Farmstead	April 16, 1980 (#80003770)	North of Highway 50; 42°56′31″N 97°33′41″W	Yankton	part of the Northern and Central Townships of Yankton MRA
20	Hoffman House	Hoffman House	November 20, 2007 (#07001216)	307 Green St. 42°52′10″N 97°24′08″W	Yankton	
21	House of Gurney Historic District	House of Gurney Historic District	August 21, 2012 (#12000536)	106, 109, & 110 Capital St. 42°52′04″N 97°23′26″W	Yankton	
22	Hoxeng Farmstead	Hoxeng Farmstead	April 16, 1980 (#80003761)	Northwest of Volin; 42°59′16″N 97°12′42″W	Volin	part of the Northern and Central Townships of Yankton MRA
23	Human Services Center	Human Services Center	April 16, 1980 (#80003771)	Off U.S. Route 81; 42°54′52″N 97°25′40″W	Yankton	part of the Northern and Central Townships of Yankton MRA
24	Ingebrigtsen-Hinseth Farmstead		April 16, 1980 (#80003737)	West of Irene; 43°05′24″N 97°12′30″W	Irene	part of the Northern and Central Townships of Yankton MRA
25	Jencks Farmstead		April 16, 1980 (#80003772)	North of Yankton, off U.S. Route 81; 42°55′14″N 97°22′40″W	Yankton	part of the Northern and Central Townships of Yankton MRA
26	Kietzman Farmstead		April 16, 1980 (#80003773)	Northeast of Utica; 43°00′47″N 97°24′35″W	Yankton	part of the Northern and Central Townships of Yankton MRA
27	Kremer House		April 16, 1980 (#80003738)	In Lesterville; 43°02′26″N 97°35′43″W	Lesterville	part of the Northern and Central Townships of Yankton MRA
28	Larson-Simonson House		April 16, 1980 (#80003742)	In Mission Hill; 42°55′19″N 97°16′48″W	Mission Hill	part of the Northern and Central Townships of Yankton MRA
29	Mathias Lasele House		April 16, 1980 (#80003739)	East of Lesterville; 43°03′40″N 97°31′51″W	Lesterville	part of the Northern and Central Townships of Yankton MRA
30	Machacek Homestead		April 16, 1980 (#80003751)	Southwest of Utica; 42°57′35″N 97°30′57″W	Utica	part of the Northern and Central Townships of Yankton MRA
31	Marindahl Post Office	Marindahl Post Office	April 16, 1980 (#80003762)	Northwest of Volin; 42°59′49″N 97°14′01″W	Volin	part of the Northern and Central Townships of Yankton MRA
32	Marindahl Township Hall		April 16, 1980 (#80003763)	Southwest of Irene; 43°02′23″N 97°14′02″W	Volin	part of the Northern and Central Townships of Yankton MRA
33	Martin's Evangelical Church	Martin's Evangelical Church	April 16, 1980 (#80003752)	43804 300 St. 43°02′22″N 97°26′16″W	Utica	part of the Northern and Central Townships of Yankton MRA
34	Walker McGregor Farmstead		April 16, 1980 (#80003774)	Northwest of Volin; 42°58′22″N 97°12′44″W	Yankton	part of the Northern and Central Townships of Yankton MRA
35	Meridian Bridge	Meridian Bridge	June 17, 1993 (#93000537)	U.S. Route 81 over the Missouri River, just south of Yankton; 42°52′05″N 97°23′37″W	Yankton	Extends into Cedar County, Nebraska; part of the Highway Bridges in Nebraska Multiple Property Submission (MPS)
36	Nels Merk Farmstead		April 16, 1980 (#80003775)	Southeast of Center Point; 43°08′47″N 97°10′49″W	Yankton	part of the Northern and Central Townships of Yankton MRA
37	Mathias Merkwan Rubblestone Barn	Mathias Merkwan Rubblestone Barn	July 6, 1987 (#87001055)	East of Tabor; 42°57′01″N 97°37′57″W	Tabor	part of the Czech Folk Architecture in Southeastern South Dakota MRA
38	Mueller Homestead		April 16, 1980 (#80003753)	East of Lesterville; 43°02′45″N 97°30′43″W	Utica	part of the Northern and Central Townships of Yankton MRA
39	New Hope Farm Polygonal Barn		January 28, 2004 (#03001537)	30725 444th Ave. 42°57′37″N 97°19′17″W	Mission Hill	part of the South Dakota's Round and Polygonal Barns and Pavilions MPS
40	New Hope Farm Swine Barn		January 28, 2004 (#03001538)	30725 444th Ave. 42°55′58″N 97°19′26″W	Mission Hill	
41	Ohlman-Shannon House	Ohlman-Shannon House	May 28, 1976 (#76001758)	205 Green St. 42°52′11″N 97°24′06″W	Yankton	
42	Old Catholic Church	Old Catholic Church	April 16, 1980 (#80003776)	43064 Lake Port Road; 42°54′52″N 97°34′58″W	Yankton	part of the Northern and Central Townships of Yankton MRA
43	Lewis Olson Log House		April 16, 1980 (#80003743)	West of Mission Hill; 42°55′58″N 97°20′17″W	Mission Hill	part of the Northern and Central Townships of Yankton MRA
44	Our Savior's Lutheran Church	Our Savior's Lutheran Church	October 7, 2001 (#01001078)	29219 431st Ave. 43°09′08″N 97°34′46″W	Menno	
45	Frantisek Pechan Log House		July 6, 1987 (#87001054)	North of Highways 50 and 52; 42°54′51″N 97°32′23″W	Tabor	part of the Czech Folk Architecture in Southeastern South Dakota MRA
46	Governor John L. Pennington House	Governor John L. Pennington House	February 8, 1988 (#88000025)	410 E. 3rd St. 42°52′12″N 97°23′08″W	Yankton	
47	Mathias Peterson Homestead		April 16, 1980 (#80003744)	Southwest of Volin; 42°56′19″N 97°14′03″W	Mission Hill	part of the Northern and Central Townships of Yankton MRA
48	Pine Street Bridge	Pine Street Bridge	January 14, 2000 (#99001697)	Pine Street over Marne Creek; 42°52′27″N 97°23′19″W	Yankton	part of the Historic Bridges in South Dakota MPS
49	Ripple House		April 16, 1980 (#80003740)	South of Lesterville; 43°01′49″N 97°35′47″W	Lesterville	part of the Northern and Central Townships of Yankton MRA
50	St. Agnes Church	St. Agnes Church	April 16, 1980 (#80003754)	43883 300 St. 43°02′21″N 97°25′19″W	Utica	part of the Northern and Central Townships of Yankton MRA
51	Schaffer Farmstead		April 16, 1980 (#80003777)	North of Yankton, off U.S. Route 81; 42°55′53″N 97°22′42″W	Yankton	part of the Northern and Central Townships of Yankton MRA
52	Fred Schnauber House	Fred Schnauber House	January 31, 1985 (#85000185)	717 Walnut St. 42°52′34″N 97°23′37″W	Yankton	
53	Scottish Rite Masonic Temple	Scottish Rite Masonic Temple	January 23, 2013 (#12001219)	333 Cedar Street; 42°52′15″N 97°23′45″W	Yankton	
54	Simonson Farmstead		April 16, 1980 (#80003745)	Southwest of Volin; 42°56′00″N 97°13′11″W	Mission Hill	part of the Northern and Central Townships of Yankton MRA
55	John Sloan Homestead		April 16, 1980 (#80003764)	Southwest of Irene; 43°01′28″N 97°11′53″W	Volin	part of the Northern and Central Townships of Yankton MRA
56	Jessie Smith Farmstead		April 16, 1980 (#80003765)	Southwest of Volin; 42°55′22″N 97°12′50″W	Volin	part of the Northern and Central Townships of Yankton MRA
57	Stribral Homestead and Farmstead		April 16, 1980 (#80003749)	South of Lesterville; 42°57′42″N 97°35′15″W	Tabor	part of the Northern and Central Townships of Yankton MRA
58	Frank Svatos Rubblestone Barn		July 6, 1987 (#87001056)	Southeast of Tabor off Highway 50; 42°56′08″N 97°37′43″W	Tabor	part of the Czech Folk Architecture in Southeastern South Dakota MRA
59	Dr. John Trierweiler House	Dr. John Trierweiler House	May 7, 1980 (#80003778)	301 Spruce St. 42°52′13″N 97°24′15″W	Yankton	
60	United Church of Christ	United Church of Christ	April 16, 1980 (#80003746)	3rd St. and Washington Ave. 42°55′26″N 97°16′46″W	Mission Hill	As of 2015, Harvest Independent Baptist Church
61	Utica Depot		April 16, 1980 (#80003755)	In Utica; 42°58′50″N 97°29′56″W	Utica	Moved to Pioneer Acres in Menno
62	Utica Fire and City Hall	Utica Fire and City Hall	April 16, 1980 (#80004591)	In Utica; 42°58′50″N 97°29′57″W	Utica	part of the Northern and Central Townships of Yankton MRA
63	Utica Public School	Utica Public School	April 16, 1980 (#80003756)	In Utica; 42°58′48″N 97°29′57″W	Utica	part of the Northern and Central Townships of Yankton MRA
64	Van Osdel House	Van Osdel House	April 16, 1980 (#80003747)	In Mission Hill; 42°55′11″N 97°16′51″W	Mission Hill	part of the Northern and Central Townships of Yankton MRA
65	Vangen Church	Vangen Church	April 16, 1980 (#80003748)	Northeastern Mission Hill; 42°55′34″N 97°15′53″W	Mission Hill	part of the Northern and Central Townships of Yankton MRA
66	Volin School	Volin School	April 16, 1980 (#80003766)	Main St. and Sherman Ave. 42°57′38″N 97°10′56″W	Volin	part of the Northern and Central Townships of Yankton MRA
67	Volin Town Hall	Volin Town Hall	April 16, 1980 (#80003767)	Main St. and Garfield Ave. 42°57′31″N 97°10′54″W	Volin	part of the Northern and Central Townships of Yankton MRA
68	Louis Volin House	Louis Volin House	April 16, 1980 (#80003768)	Northwest of Volin; 42°57′25″N 97°10′45″W	Volin	part of the Northern and Central Townships of Yankton MRA
69	Walloch Farmstead		April 16, 1980 (#80003741)	South of Lesterville; 43°00′27″N 97°36′44″W	Lesterville	part of the Northern and Central Townships of Yankton MRA
70	Walshtown School		April 16, 1980 (#80003779)	South of Highway 46; 43°02′22″N 97°19′11″W	Yankton	part of the Northern and Central Townships of Yankton MRA
71	Western Portland Cement Plant	Western Portland Cement Plant	September 19, 1979 (#79002411)	West of Yankton; 42°52′43″N 97°28′43″W	Yankton	
72	Yankton Carnegie Library	Yankton Carnegie Library	August 7, 1979 (#79002412)	4th and Capitol Sts. 42°52′17″N 97°23′26″W	Yankton	
73	Yankton College Conservatory	Yankton College Conservatory	February 24, 1975 (#75001724)	Yankton College campus 42°52′51″N 97°23′25″W	Yankton	Now part of Yankton Federal Prison.
74	Yankton College Historic District	Yankton College Historic District	March 22, 1982 (#82003949)	12th and Douglas Sts. 42°52′49″N 97°23′22″W	Yankton	
75	Yankton High School Historic District	Yankton High School Historic District	May 30, 2002 (#02000578)	613 Walnut St. 42°52′29″N 97°23′39″W	Yankton	part of the Schools in South Dakota MPS
76	Yankton Historic Commercial District	Yankton Historic Commercial District	June 23, 1982 (#82003950)	Roughly bounded by 2nd, 4th, Pine and Broadway Sts. 42°52′49″N 97°23′22″W	Yankton	Boundary decrease approved August 24, 2018.
77	Yankton Historic District		February 13, 1975 (#75001725)	Bounded by Marne Creek and 4th St., and including both sides of Cedar; 42°52′22″N 97°23′21″W	Yankton	
78	Zion Lutheran Church	Zion Lutheran Church	April 16, 1980 (#80004527)	Northwest of Volin; 42°59′47″N 97°13′23″W	Volin	part of the Northern and Central Townships of Yankton MRA

== Former listing ==
	Name on the Register	Image	Date listed	Date removed	Location	City or town	Description
1	Steingrube Place		January 28, 2004 (#03001539)	September 17, 2004	30089 452nd Ave. 43°01′51″N 97°09′39″W	Wakonda	part of the Northern and Central Townships of Yankton MRA
2	Walnut Street Bridge		January 14, 2000 (#99001692)	March 26, 2008	Walnut Street over Marne Creek	Yankton	
3	Yankton County Courthouse		September 3, 1976 (#76001759)	August 20, 2003	3rd St. and Broadway	Yankton	Demolished in June 2003.

== See also ==
- List of National Historic Landmarks in South Dakota
- National Register of Historic Places listings in South Dakota
