= St. Agnes Church (Utica, South Dakota) =

Historic church in Utica, South Dakota, United States

- U.S. National Register of Historic Places
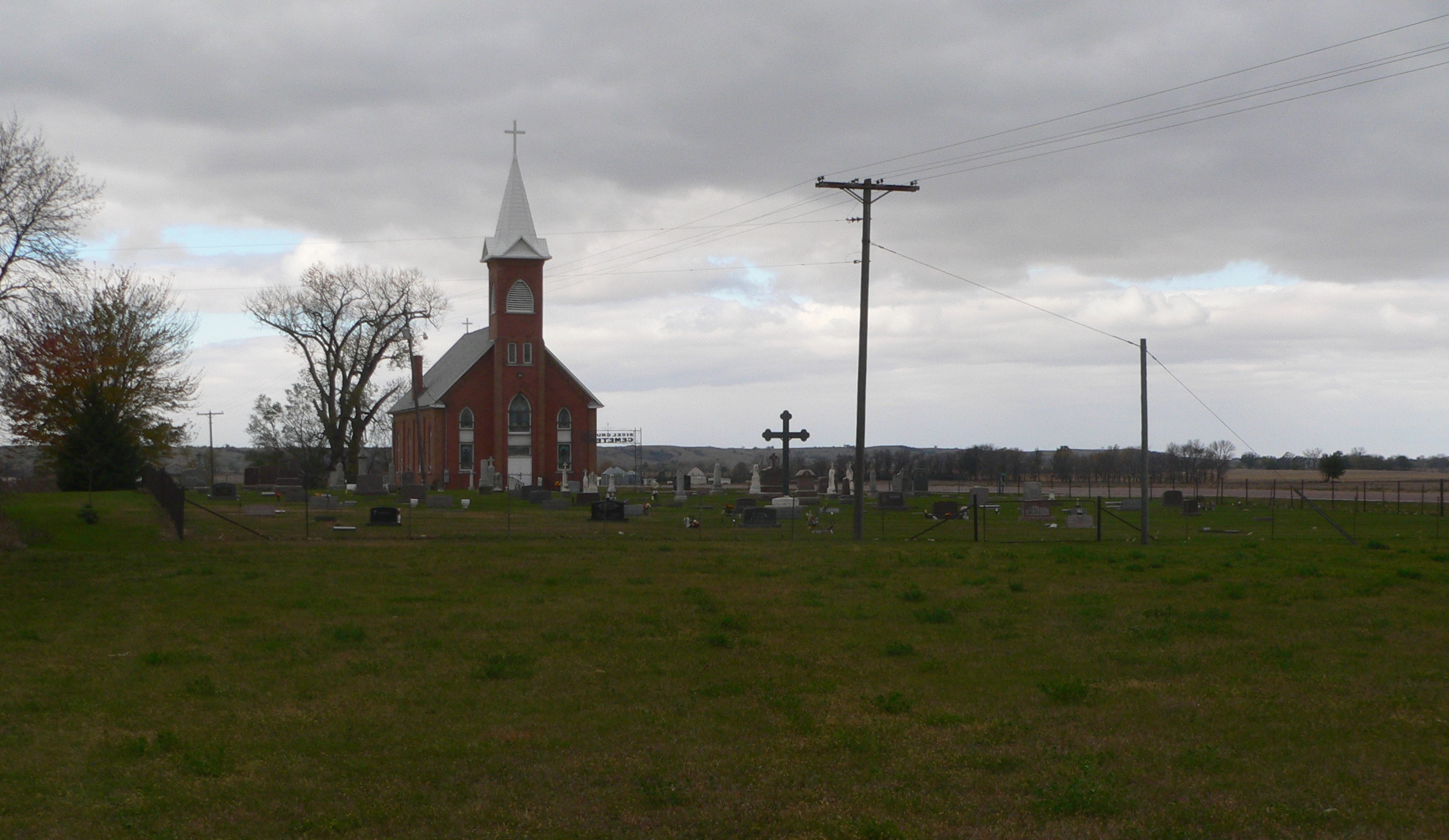

- Location within South Dakota Location within the United States
- Location: E of Lesterville, South Dakota
- Coordinates: 43°2′20″N 97°25′18″W
- Built: c.1890s
- Architectural style: Gothic
- MPS: Northern and Central Townships of Yankton MRA
- NRHP reference No.: 80003754
- Added to NRHP: April 16, 1980

The St. Agnes Church is a congregation of the Roman Catholic Church in Utica, South Dakota, operated as a mission of the parish of St. John the Baptist in Lesterville, both in the Diocese of Sioux Falls. It is noted for its historic Gothic Revival church, sometimes known as the Sigel Church after the former name of the area, which was built in the 1890s and added to the National Register of Historic Places in 1980.

The church is situated in rural Yankton County, about 4,800 feet (1.5 km) east of NRHP-listed Martin's Evangelical Church. The community was established in 1885 and as of 2010, had about 40 families.
