= Burns House =

Burns House may refer to:

in Scotland

- Burns Cottage, a home of poet Robert Burns

in the United States

- Bob Burns House, Van Buren, Arkansas, listed on the National Register of Historic Places (NRHP) in Crawford County
- Irene Burns House, Auburn, California, listed on the NRHP in Placer County
- William J. Burns House, Sarasota, Florida, NRHP-listed
- Burns Realty Company-Karl Bickel House, Sarasota, Florida, NRHP-listed
- Burns Cottage (Atlanta, Georgia), NRHP-listed
- Caleb Burns House, Maryville, Missouri, listed on the NRHP in Nodaway County
- Burns Family Farm, Bovina, New York, NRHP-listed
- Emma Petznick and Otto Schade House, Bowman, North Dakota, also as the Opal Burns Home, listed on the NRHP
- Jeremiah Burns Farm, Waynesboro, Pennsylvania, NRHP-listed
- Burns House (Yankton, South Dakota), NRHP-listed
- Arthur Burns House, Cuero, Texas, listed on the NRHP in DeWitt County
- John W. Burns House, Cuero, Texas, listed on the NRHP in DeWitt County
