= Marindahl Lake =

Lake in the state of South Dakota, United States

- Location within South Dakota Location within the United States
- Location: Yankton County, near Volin, South Dakota
- Coordinates: 43°02′14″N 97°15′22″W
- Basin countries: United States
- Surface area: 147 acres (59 ha)
- Surface elevation: 1,322 ft (403 m)

Marindahl Lake is a 147-acre (590,000 m^{2}) lake in Yankton County, South Dakota. It is located 4 miles west and 3 miles south of the city of Irene.

== See also ==
- List of South Dakota lakes
- List of lakes in the United States
