= DeJong House =

- U.S. National Register of Historic Places
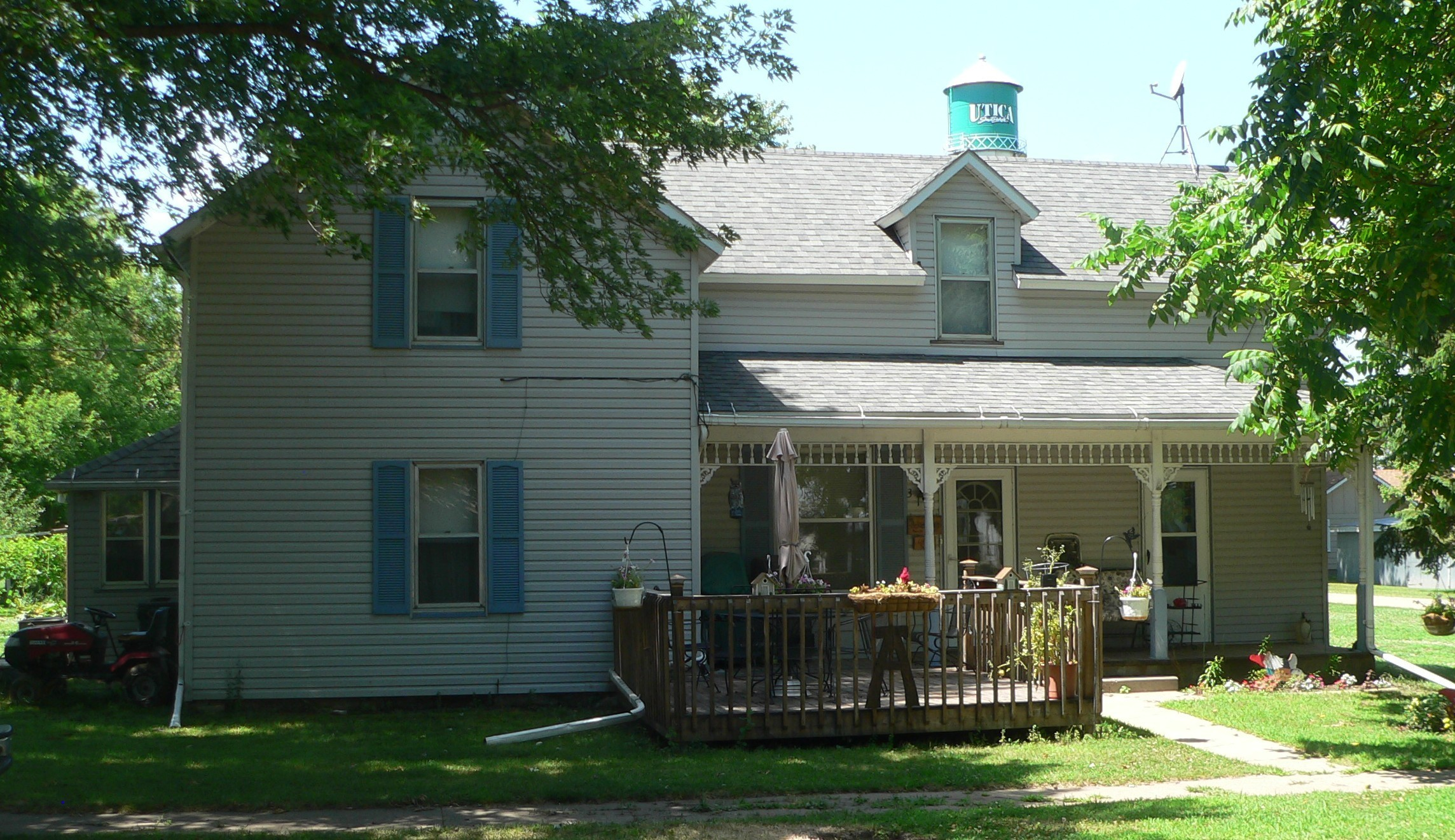
- The house in 2016

- Location within South Dakota Location within the United States
- Location: In Utica, Utica, South Dakota
- Coordinates: 42°58′52″N 97°29′54″W
- Area: 1 acre (0.40 ha)
- Built: 1905
- Architectural style: Vernacular L-shaped
- MPS: Northern and Central Townships of Yankton MRA
- NRHP reference No.: 80003750
- Added to NRHP: April 16, 1980

The DeJong House is a historic one-and-a-half-story house in Utica, South Dakota. It was built in 1905 as an "L-shaped gable structure with clapboard facing and two single stack chimneys." It has been listed on the National Register of Historic Places since April 16, 1980.
