= Zion Lutheran Church (Volin, South Dakota) =

Historic church in South Dakota, United States

- U.S. National Register of Historic Places
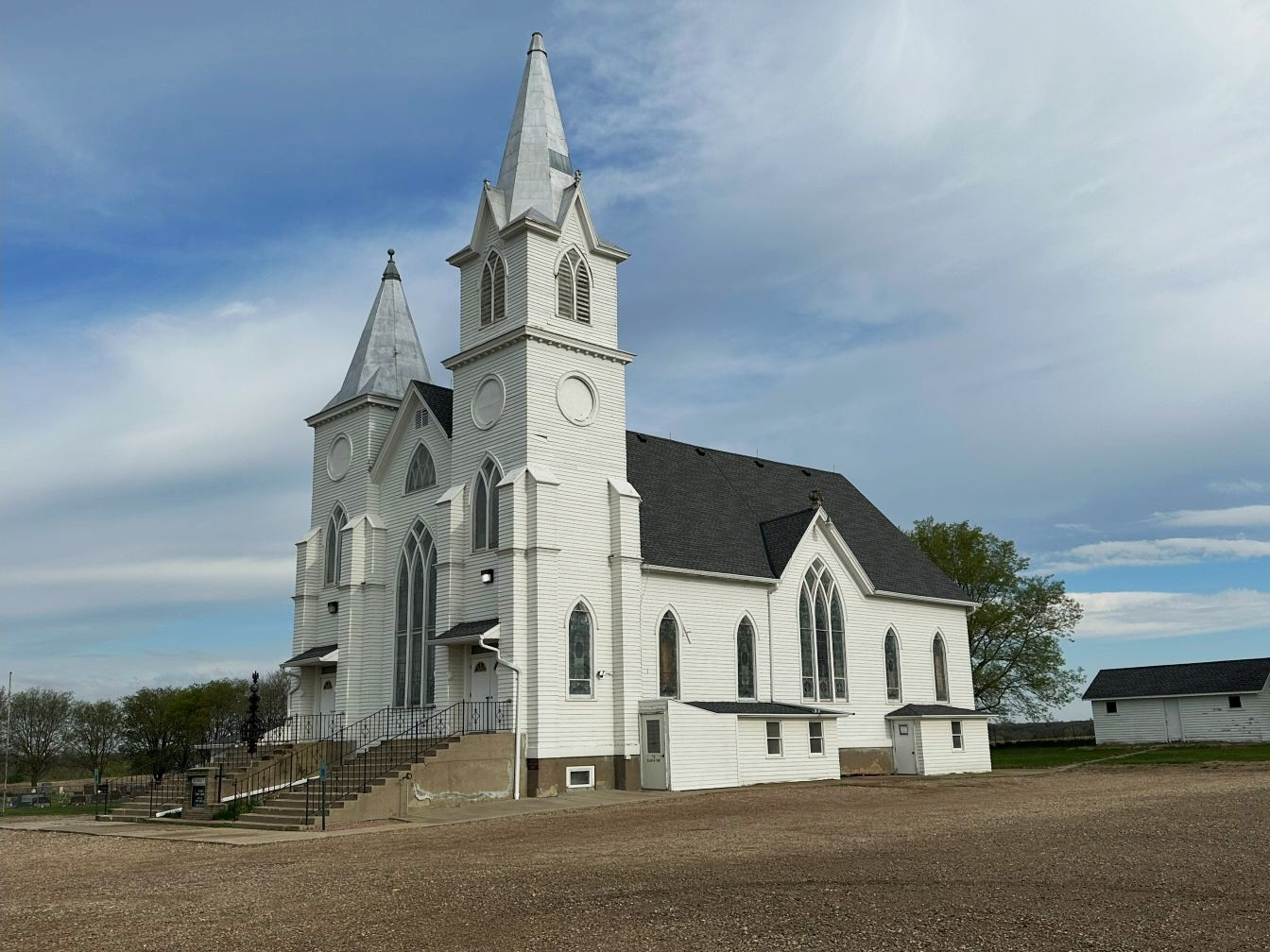
- The church in 2025

- Location within South Dakota Location within the United States
- Location: NW of Volin, South Dakota
- Coordinates: 42°59′47″N 97°13′23″W
- Area: 4 acres (1.6 ha)
- Built: 1915
- Architectural style: Vernacular Gothic
- MPS: Northern and Central Townships of Yankton MRA
- NRHP reference No.: 80004527
- Added to NRHP: April 16, 1980

Zion Lutheran Church is a historic church northwest of Volin in rural Yankton County, South Dakota. It is situated 8½ miles east of the Volin exit on U.S. Route 81. The church was built in 1915 in Gothic Vernacular style. The building is of wood-frame construction with a foundation of concrete block veneer. Stained glass windows, vaulted ceilings and twin steeples are distinctive features of the building. The church was added to the National Register of Historic Places in 1980. The church now houses the Faith United Lutheran Church which is affiliated with the Evangelical Lutheran Church in America
