= Volin Town Hall =

- U.S. National Register of Historic Places
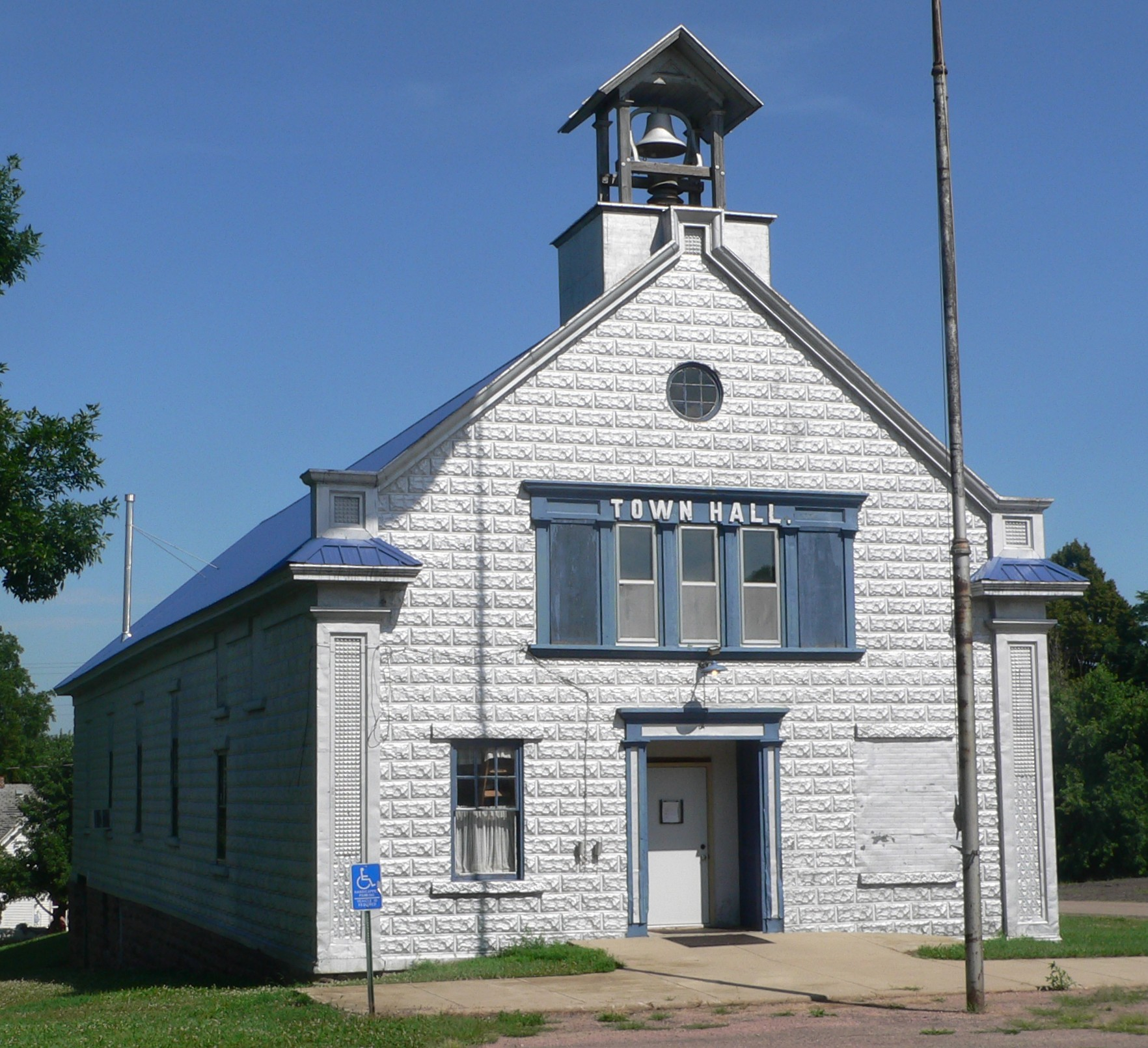
- The building in 2016

- Location within South Dakota Location within the United States
- Location: In Volin, Volin, South Dakota
- Coordinates: 42°57′31″N 97°10′53″W
- Area: 1 acre (0.40 ha)
- Built: 1905
- Built by: Larving & Terhosen
- Architectural style: Vernacular Neo-Classical
- MPS: Northern and Central Townships of Yankton MRA
- NRHP reference No.: 80003767
- Added to NRHP: April 16, 1980

The Volin Town Hall is a historic building in Volin, South Dakota. It was built in 1905 by Larving & Terhosen, and designed in the Vernacular Neoclassical architectural style. Besides being the town hall for Volin, it has also served as "a theater, an opera house, a lecture hall, a basketball court, and a public meeting house." It has been listed on the National Register of Historic Places since April 16, 1980.
