= Vangen =

Vangen may refer to:

== Places ==
- Vangen, Akershus, a village in Fet municipality, Akershus county, Norway
- Vangen, Enebakk, a tourist retreat in Enebakk municipality, Akershus county, Norway
- Vossevangen or simply Vangen, a village in Voss municipality, Hordaland county, Norway
- Vangen Church (Aurland), a church in Aurland municipality, Sogn og Fjordane county, Norway
- Vangen Church (South Dakota), a church in Mission Hill, South Dakota, USA
- Vangen power station, one of the five facilities that are part of the Aurland Hydroelectric Power Station

== People ==
- Thorleif Vangen, a Norwegian skier from Kongsvinger
