= Brockmueller Barn =

- U.S. National Register of Historic Places
- Location within South Dakota Location within the United States
- Location: S of SD 46, Volin, South Dakota
- Coordinates: 43.043500°N 97.319693°W
- Area: 1 acre (0.40 ha)
- Built: 1902
- Built by: Charles Brockmueller
- MPS: Northern and Central Townships of Yankton MRA
- NRHP reference No.: 80003757
- Added to NRHP: April 16, 1980

The Brockmueller Barn is a historic barn near Volin, South Dakota. It was built in 1902 by Charles Brockmueller who had acquired the land in 1893, and designed with a "pitched gable roof with side extensions, a random rock-faced stone ground story and horizontal wood siding upper levels.". It was purchased by John Schnider in 1945, and later inherited by his son. It has been listed on the National Register of Historic Places since April 16, 1980.

It is located on a farm on what is now 444th Ave., about 500 yards (460 m) north of 300th St., in Walshtown Township, Yankton County, South Dakota. It is located northwest of Volin.
