= Gorsett Farmstead =

- U.S. National Register of Historic Places
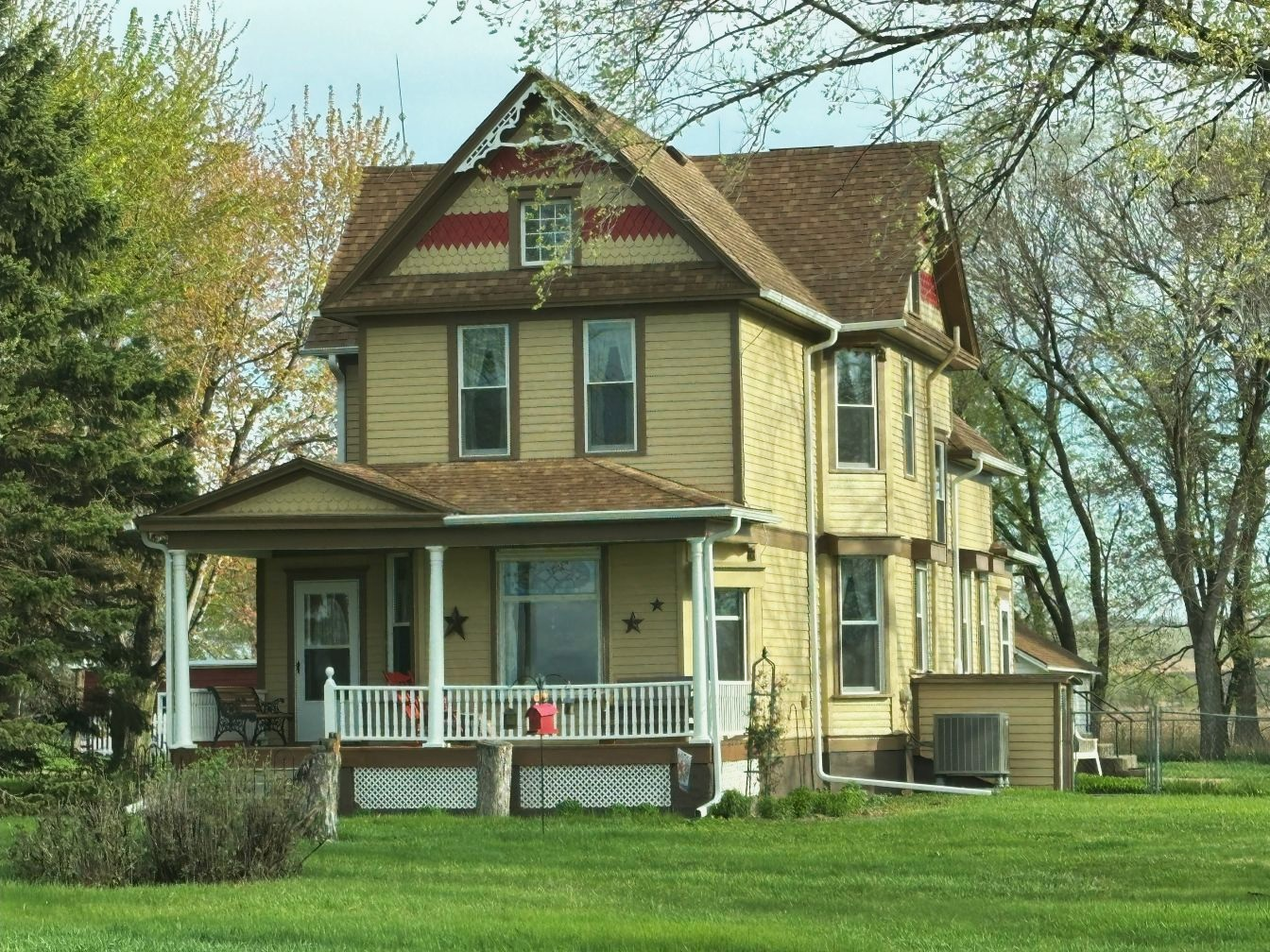

- Location within South Dakota Location within the United States
- Location: N of Volin, Volin, South Dakota
- Coordinates: 42°58′56″N 97°11′11″W
- Area: 4 acres (1.6 ha)
- Built: 1912
- Architectural style: Colonial Revival, Queen Anne
- MPS: Northern and Central Townships of Yankton MRA
- NRHP reference No.: 80003759
- Added to NRHP: April 16, 1980

The Gorsett Farmstead is a historic house in Volin, South Dakota. It was built in 1912, and designed in the Neocolonial and Queen Anne architectural styles. It has been listed on the National Register of Historic Places since April 16, 1980.
