= Lesterville =

Lesterville may refer to:

- Lesterville, Michigan
- Lesterville, Missouri
- Lesterville, South Dakota
