= Mathias Lasele House =

- U.S. National Register of Historic Places
- Location within South Dakota Location within the United States
- Location: E of Lesterville, Lesterville, South Dakota
- Coordinates: 43°03′40″N 97°31′51″W
- Area: 1 acre (0.40 ha)
- Built: 1890
- MPS: Northern and Central Townships of Yankton MRA
- NRHP reference No.: 80003739
- Added to NRHP: April 16, 1980

The Mathias Lasele House is a historic one-story house in Lesterville, South Dakota. It was built in 1890 with sod, which was "typically the first construction material that was used by European immigrants when they arrived in Dakota Territory." It has been listed on the National Register of Historic Places since April 16, 1980.
