= Van Osdel House =

- U.S. National Register of Historic Places
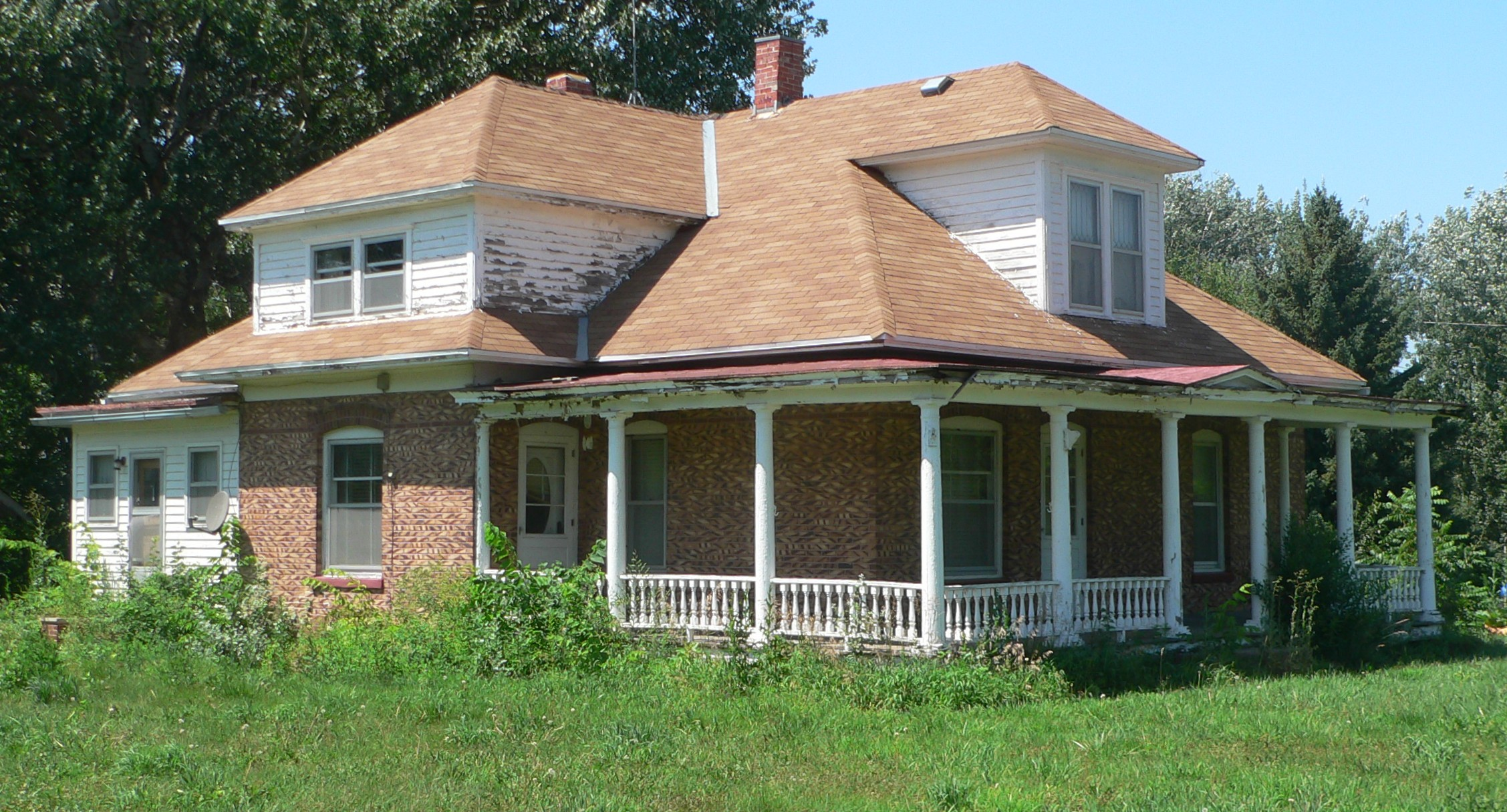
- The house in 2016

- Location within South Dakota Location within the United States
- Location: In Mission Hill, Mission Hill, South Dakota
- Coordinates: 42°55′12″N 97°16′50″W
- Area: less than one acre
- Built: 1912
- Architectural style: Hip Cottage
- MPS: Northern and Central Townships of Yankton MRA
- NRHP reference No.: 80003747
- Added to NRHP: April 16, 1980

The Van Osdel House is a historic house in Mission Hill, South Dakota. It was built in 1912 for Abraham Lincoln Van Osdel, who served in the Union Army during the American Civil War of 1861-1865 and was later elected as a member of the South Dakota Legislature in 1877, 1881, 1885, 1899, 1906 and 1907. Van Osdel was also the commander of the South Dakota department of the Grand Army of the Republic, a book collector, an author and a poet; he died in 1936. The house has been listed on the National Register of Historic Places since April 16, 1980.
