= Ripple House =

- U.S. National Register of Historic Places
- Location within South Dakota Location within the United States
- Location: S of Lesterville, Lesterville, South Dakota
- Coordinates: 43°01′49″N 97°35′47″W
- Area: 1 acre (0.40 ha)
- Built: 1919
- Architectural style: Craftsman-Colonial Revival
- MPS: Northern and Central Townships of Yankton MRA
- NRHP reference No.: 80003740
- Added to NRHP: April 16, 1980

The Ripple House is a historic house in Lesterville, South Dakota. It was built in 1919, with a gable roof and a dormer. The porch was designed in the American Craftsman and Neoclassical styles, with Palladian windows. The house has been listed on the National Register of Historic Places since April 16, 1980.
