= Jamesville Colony, South Dakota =

- Census-designated place
- Location within South Dakota Location within the United States
- Coordinates: 43°06′06″N 97°28′54″W
- Country: United States
- State: South Dakota
- County: Yankton

Area
  - Total: 0.10 sq mi (0.27 km^{2})
  - Land: 0.10 sq mi (0.27 km^{2})
  - Water: 0 sq mi (0.00 km^{2})
- Elevation: 1,184 ft (361 m)

Population (2020)
  - Total: 110
  - Density: 1,049.8/sq mi (405.34/km^{2})
- Time zone: UTC-6 (Central (CST))
  - Summer (DST): UTC-5 (CDT)
- ZIP Code: 57067 (Utica)
- Area code: 605
- FIPS code: 46-32388
- GNIS feature ID: 2813067

Jamesville Colony is a census-designated place (CDP) and Hutterite colony in Yankton County, South Dakota, United States. The population was 110 at the 2020 census. It was first listed as a CDP prior to the 2020 census.

It is in the northwest part of the county, on the north side of the James River. It is 9 miles (14 km) north of Utica and 20 miles (32 km) north-northwest of Yankton, the county seat.

== Demographics ==
Historical population
Census	Pop.	Note	%±
2020	110		—
U.S. Decennial Census

== Education ==
It is in the Menno School District 33-2.
