= Aggergaard Manor =

- U.S. National Register of Historic Places
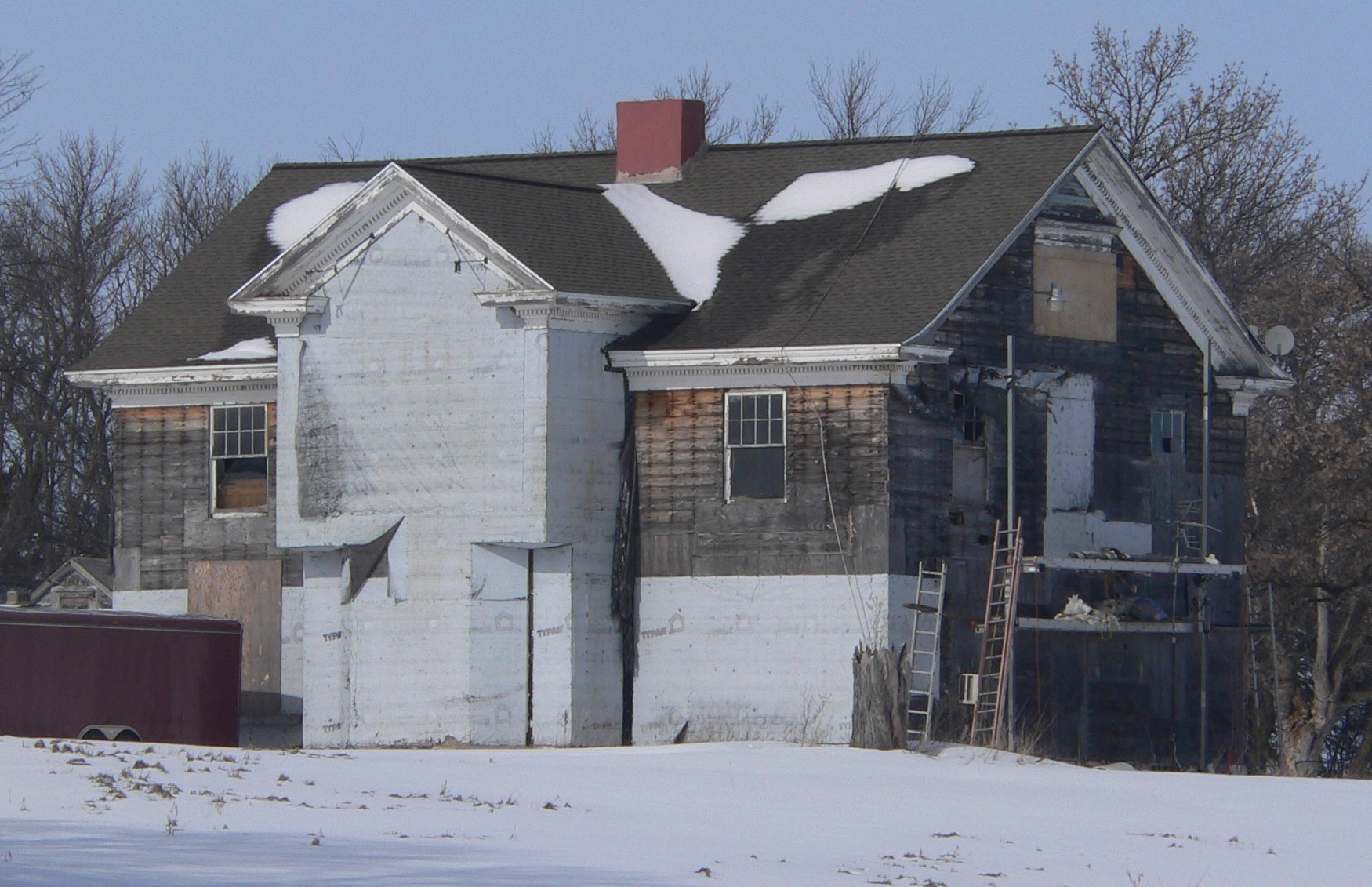
- The building in 2016

- Location within South Dakota Location within the United States
- Location: Thompson Street, Irene, South Dakota
- Coordinates: 43°05′03″N 97°09′37″W
- Area: 5 acres (2.0 ha)
- Built: 1904
- Architectural style: Colonial Revival
- NRHP reference No.: 01000636
- Added to NRHP: June 6, 2001

Aggergaard Manor is a historic house in Irene, South Dakota. It was designed in the Colonial Revival style, and built in 1904 for Peter N. Aggergaard, an immigrant from Denmark. Born in 1844, he emigrated to the United States in 1872 and became a homesteader in the Dakota Territory in 1873, eventually owning 16,000 acres. Aggergaard sponsored Danes to emigrate to the United States and work on his farm. He was also a banker, and he became known as the "King of the Viborg settlement." He lived here with his wife, their three sons and six daughters; he died in 1921. The house has been listed on the National Register of Historic Places since June 6, 2001.
