= Simonson Farmstead =

- U.S. National Register of Historic Places
- Location within South Dakota Location within the United States
- Location: SW of Volin, Mission Hill, South Dakota
- Coordinates: 42°56′00″N 97°13′11″W
- Area: 2 acres (0.81 ha)
- Built: 1890
- Architectural style: Vernacular Neo-Dutch Colon.
- MPS: Northern and Central Townships of Yankton MRA
- NRHP reference No.: 80003745
- Added to NRHP: April 16, 1980

The Simonson Farmstead is a historic house in Mission Hill, South Dakota. It was built in 1890, and designed in the Dutch Colonial Revival architectural style, with a gable roof. A gambrel roof was added in 1906. The house has been listed on the National Register of Historic Places since April 16, 1980.
