= John Sloan Homestead =

- Sloan, John, Homestead
- U.S. National Register of Historic Places
- Location within South Dakota Location within the United States
- Location: SW of Irene, Volin, South Dakota
- Coordinates: 43°01′28″N 97°11′53″W
- Area: 4 acres (1.6 ha)
- Built: 1883
- MPS: Northern and Central Townships of Yankton MRA
- NRHP reference No.: 80003764
- Added to NRHP: April 16, 1980

The John Sloan Homestead is a historic house in Volin, South Dakota. It was built in 1881–1885 with chalk rock by John Sloan, who established the homestead in 1880. It has been listed on the National Register of Historic Places since April 16, 1980.
