= Mathias Peterson Homestead =

- U.S. National Register of Historic Places
- Location within South Dakota Location within the United States
- Location: SW of Volin, Mission Hill, South Dakota
- Coordinates: 42°56′19″N 97°14′03″W
- Area: 2 acres (0.81 ha)
- Built: 1880
- Architectural style: log house
- MPS: Northern and Central Townships of Yankton MRA
- NRHP reference No.: 80003744
- Added to NRHP: April 16, 1980

The Mathias Peterson Homestead is a historic log house in Mission Hill, South Dakota. It was built in 1880 by Pete Peterson Hovden, with "a gable roof with wooden shingles and a small gabled portice marking the off-set front door." It has been listed on the National Register of Historic Places since April 16, 1980.
