= Blocker House =

Blocker House may refer to:

- Blocker House (Edgefield, South Carolina), listed on the National Register of Historic Places
- Emma Petznick and Otto Schade House, Bowman, North Dakota also known as the H.A. Blocker House
