= Larson-Simonson House =

- U.S. National Register of Historic Places
- Location within South Dakota Location within the United States
- Location: In Mission Hill, Mission Hill, South Dakota
- Coordinates: 42°55′19″N 97°16′48″W
- Area: 1 acre (0.40 ha)
- Built: 1911
- Architectural style: Colonial Revival
- MPS: Northern and Central Townships of Yankton MRA
- NRHP reference No.: 80003742
- Added to NRHP: April 16, 1980

The Larson-Simonson House is a historic house in Mission Hill, South Dakota. It was built in 1911 for Mathis Larson, who sold it to Andrew Simonson in 1915. It was designed in the Neoclassical architectural style, with a gable roof and a Palladian window. It has been listed on the National Register of Historic Places since April 16, 1980.
