= Old Catholic Church (disambiguation) =

Old Catholic Church, various churches which have their origins in separations from the Roman Catholic Church or which formed later with a similar identity

Otherwise, Old Catholic Church may also refer to:

- History of the Catholic Church
- Lakeport Church (Yankton County, South Dakota), listed as "Old Catholic Church" in the National Register of Historic Places
