= Bernt Gustad House =

- U.S. National Register of Historic Places
- Location within South Dakota Location within the United States
- Location: NW of Volin, Volin, South Dakota
- Coordinates: 42°58′10″N 97°20′13″W
- Area: 1 acre (0.40 ha)
- Built: 1906
- Architectural style: Queen Anne
- MPS: Northern and Central Townships of Yankton MRA
- NRHP reference No.: 80003760
- Added to NRHP: April 16, 1980

The Bernt Gustad House is a historic one-and-a-half-story house in Volin, South Dakota. It was built in 1906 as a cottage with a dormer, and designed in the Queen Anne architectural style. It has been listed on the National Register of Historic Places since April 16, 1980.
