= Louis Volin House =

- U.S. National Register of Historic Places
- Location within South Dakota Location within the United States
- Location: NW of Volin, Volin, South Dakota
- Coordinates: 42°57′25″N 97°10′45″W
- Area: 1 acre (0.40 ha)
- Built: 1875
- Architectural style: Queen Anne
- MPS: Northern and Central Townships of Yankton MRA
- NRHP reference No.: 80003768
- Added to NRHP: April 16, 1980

The Louis Volin House is a historic two-story house in Volin, South Dakota. It was built in 1875 for Louis Volin, an immigrant from Quebec, Canada who founded the town of Volin in what was then known as the Dakota Territory. The facade was designed in the Queen Anne and Neocolonial architectural styles. The house has been listed on the National Register of Historic Places since April 16, 1980.
