= Frantisek Pechan Log House =

Historic house in South Dakota, United States

- U.S. National Register of Historic Places
- Location within South Dakota Location within the United States
- Location: North of highways 50 and 52 near Tabor
- Coordinates: 42°54′51″N 97°32′23″W
- Architect: Pechan, Frankisek
- Architectural style: Czech folk architecture
- MPS: Czech Folk Architecture of Southeastern South Dakota
- NRHP reference No.: 87001054
- Added to NRHP: July 6, 1987

The Frantisek Pechan Log House is a historic barn located near Tabor, South Dakota, United States. It was added to the National Register of Historic Places on July 6, 1987, as part of a "Thematic Nomination of Czech Folk Architecture of Southeastern South Dakota".

== See also ==
- National Register of Historic Places listings in Yankton County, South Dakota
