= Marindahl Post Office =

- U.S. National Register of Historic Places
- Location within South Dakota Location within the United States
- Location: NW of Volin, Volin, South Dakota
- Coordinates: 42°59′49″N 97°14′01″W
- Area: 1 acre (0.40 ha)
- Built: c.1870
- Architectural style: log
- MPS: Northern and Central Townships of Yankton MRA
- NRHP reference No.: 80003762
- Added to NRHP: April 16, 1980

The Marindahl Post Office, located northwest of Volin, South Dakota, was built around 1870. It was listed on the National Register of Historic Places in 1980.

It is a one-and-a-half-story log building. It was the first non-military post office in South Dakota. It was built by Christian Marindahl. It served as a gathering and meeting place as well as a post office.
