= Walker McGregor Farmstead =

- McGregor, Walker, Farmstead
- U.S. National Register of Historic Places
- Location within South Dakota Location within the United States
- Location: NW of Volin, Yankton, South Dakota
- Coordinates: 42°58′22″N 97°12′44″W
- Area: 4 acres (1.6 ha)
- Built: 1876
- Built by: Fergus Walker
- MPS: Northern and Central Townships of Yankton MRA
- NRHP reference No.: 80003774
- Added to NRHP: April 16, 1980

The Walker McGregor Farmstead is a historic house in Yankton, South Dakota. It was built by Fergus Walker with chalk rock in 1876. It was purchased by Scottish-born Alexander McGregor in 1884, and it remained in the McGregor family until 1916. It was listed on the National Register of Historic Places in 1980.
