= Bishop Marty Rectory =

- U.S. National Register of Historic Places
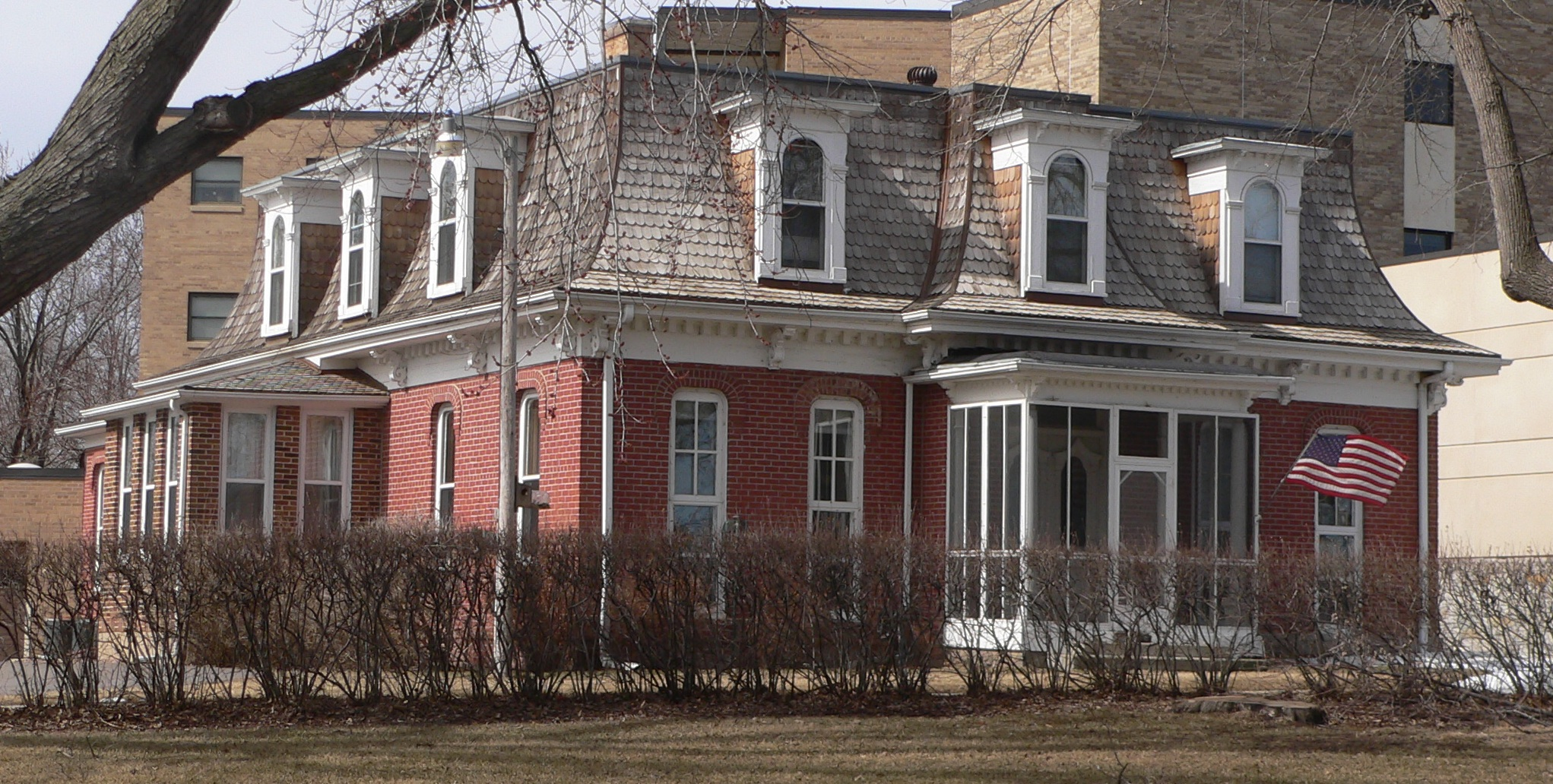
- The building in 2011

- Location within South Dakota Location within the United States
- Location: 1101 West 5th Street, Yankton, South Dakota
- Coordinates: 42°52′16″N 97°24′29″W
- Area: less than one acre
- Built: 1883
- NRHP reference No.: 74001900
- Added to NRHP: December 27, 1974

The Bishop Marty Rectory is a historic one-story building on the campus of Mount Marty College in Yankton, South Dakota. It was built in 1883 as a Roman Catholic rectory, and Bishop Martin Marty moved in the following year. It has been listed on the National Register of Historic Places since December 27, 1974.
