= Bruce-Donaldson House =

- U.S. National Register of Historic Places
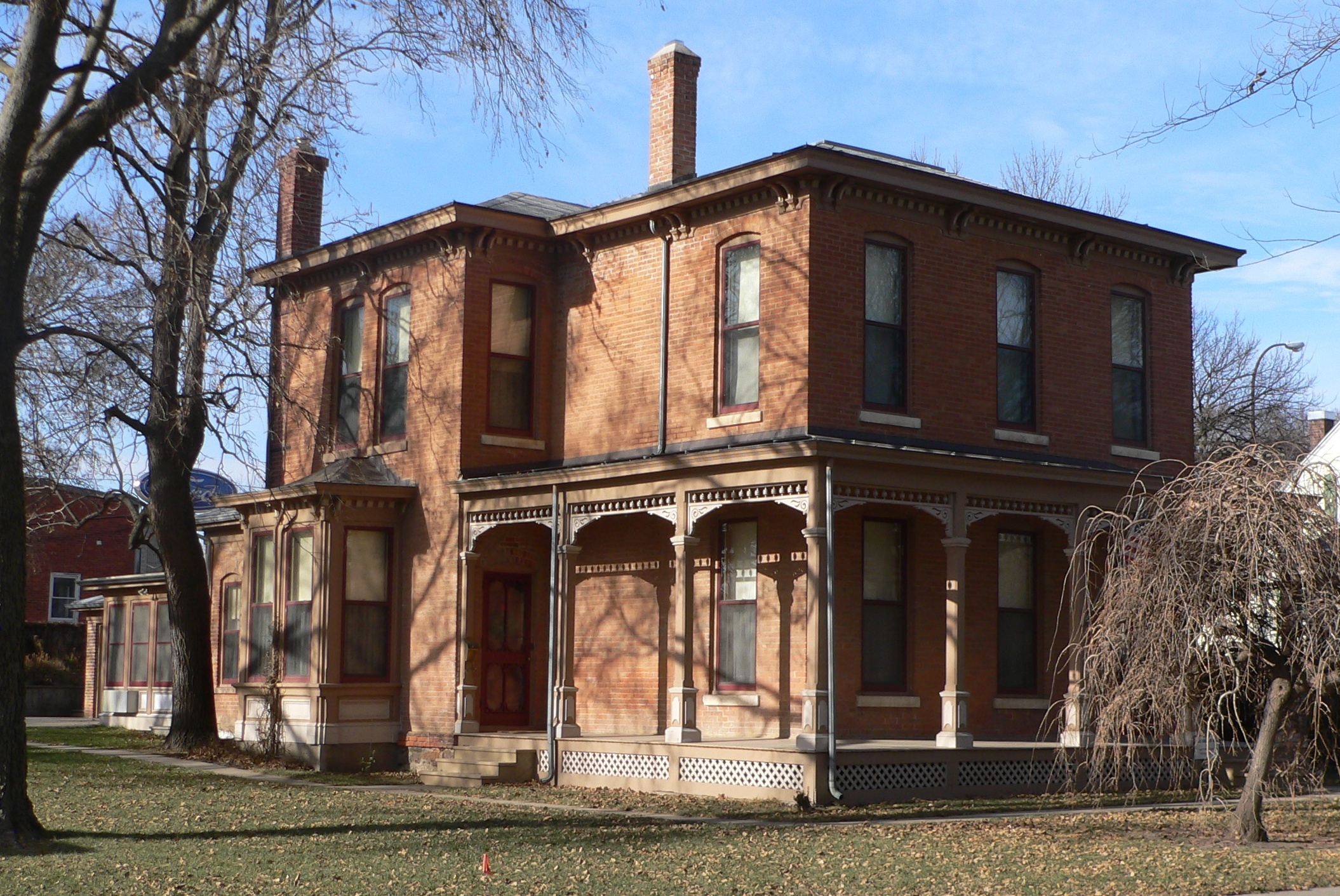
- The house in 2010

- Location within South Dakota Location within the United States
- Location: 313 Pine Street, Yankton, South Dakota
- Coordinates: 42°52′14″N 97°23′20″W
- Area: 1.5 acres (0.61 ha)
- Built: 1879
- Architectural style: Italianate
- NRHP reference No.: 82003946
- Added to NRHP: March 5, 1982

The Bruce-Donaldson House is a historic two-story house in Yankton, South Dakota. It was built in 1879 for James E. Bruce, who sold it to Fred Donaldson, an immigrant from Sweden who became a grocer in Yankton. It was designed in the Italianate architectural style. It has been listed on the National Register of Historic Places since March 5, 1982.
