= Dr. B.M. Banton House =

- Dr. B. M. Banton House
- U.S. National Register of Historic Places
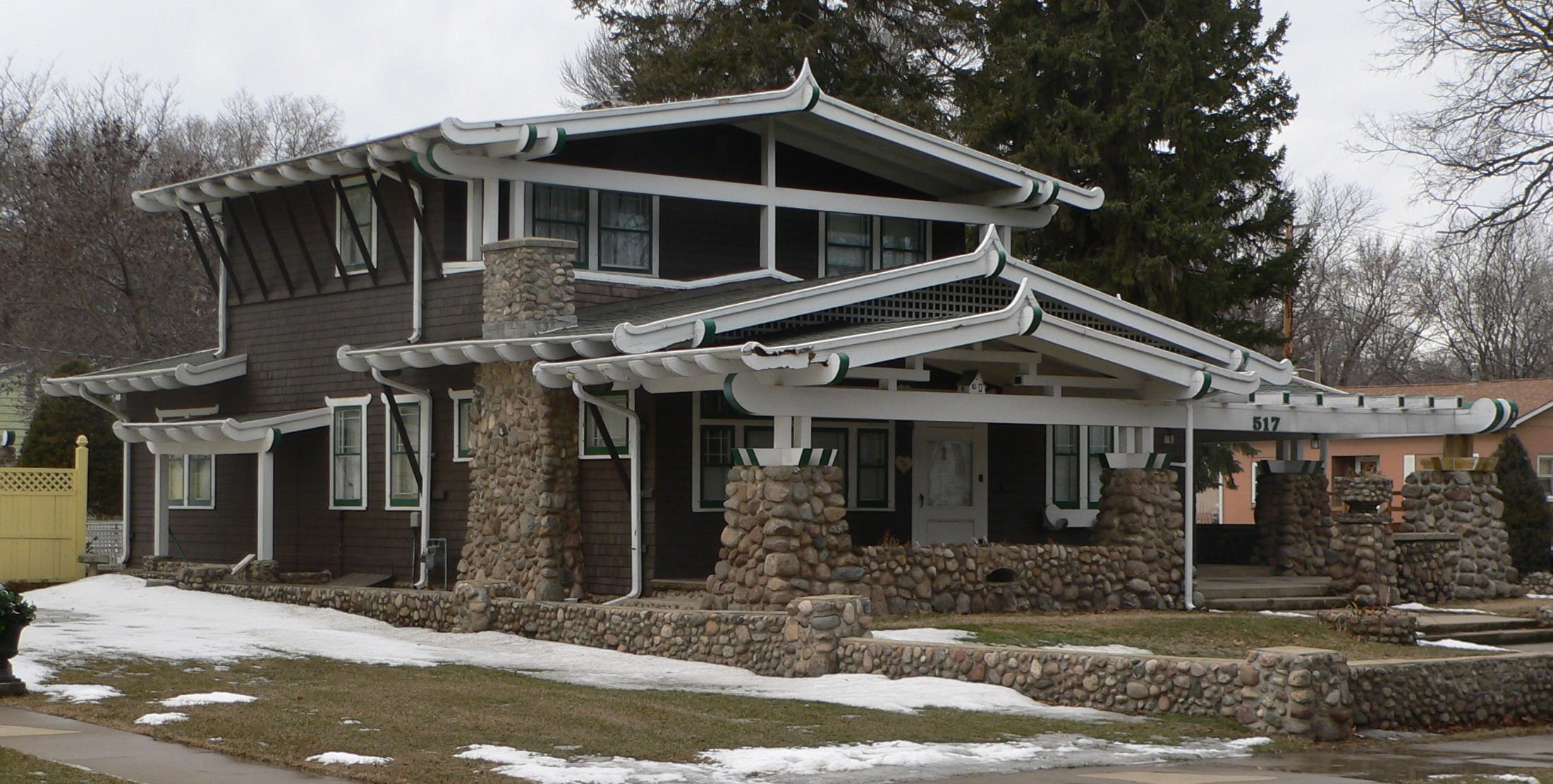
- The house in 2011

- Location within South Dakota Location within the United States
- Location: 517 Locust Street, Yankton, South Dakota
- Coordinates: 42°52′24″N 97°23′59″W
- Area: less than one acre
- Built: 1920
- Architect: Dr. B.M. Banton
- Architectural style: Airplane Bungalow
- NRHP reference No.: 87001729
- Added to NRHP: October 8, 1987

The Dr. B.M. Banton House is a historic two-story house in Yankton, South Dakota. It was built in 1920-1921 and designed in the California bungalow style by Dr. B.M. Banton, a dentist. It has been listed on the National Register of Historic Places since October 8, 1987.
