= Mathias Merkwan Rubblestone Barn =

- U.S. National Register of Historic Places
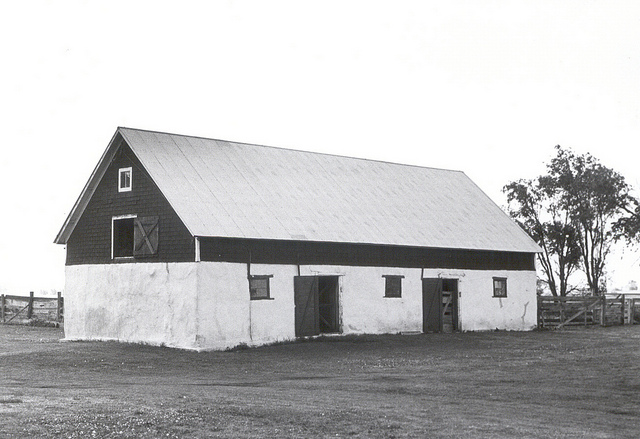

- Location within South Dakota Location within the United States
- Location: East of Tabor
- Coordinates: 42°57′01″N 97°37′57″W
- Architect: Merkwan, Mathias
- Architectural style: Czech folk architecture
- NRHP reference No.: 87001055
- Added to NRHP: July 6, 1987

The Mathias Merkwan Rubblestone Barn is a historic barn located near Tabor, South Dakota, United States. It was added to the National Register of Historic Places on July 6, 1987, as part of a "Thematic Nomination of Czech Folk Architecture of Southeastern South Dakota".

== See also ==
- National Register of Historic Places listings in Yankton County, South Dakota
