= Frank Svatos Rubblestone Barn =

- U.S. National Register of Historic Places
- Location within South Dakota Location within the United States
- Location: Southeast of Tabor off Highway 50
- Coordinates: 42°56′08″N 97°37′43″W
- Architect: Svatos, Frank
- Architectural style: Czech folk architecture
- NRHP reference No.: 87001056
- Added to NRHP: July 6, 1987

The Frank Svatos Rubblestone Barn is a historic barn located near Tabor, South Dakota, United States. It was added to the National Register of Historic Places on July 6, 1987, as part of a "Thematic Nomination of Czech Folk Architecture of Southeastern South Dakota".

== See also ==
- National Register of Historic Places listings in Yankton County, South Dakota
