= Mueller Homestead =

- U.S. National Register of Historic Places
- Location within South Dakota Location within the United States
- Location: E of Lesterville, Utica, South Dakota
- Coordinates: 43°02′45″N 97°30′43″W
- Area: 4 acres (1.6 ha)
- Built: 1905
- Architectural style: Late Victorian
- MPS: Northern and Central Townships of Yankton MRA
- NRHP reference No.: 80003753
- Added to NRHP: April 16, 1980

The Mueller Homestead is a historic house in Utica, South Dakota. It was built in 1905, and designed in the Late Victorian architectural style, with a gable roof designed in the stick style. The house has been listed on the National Register of Historic Places since April 16, 1980.
