= Utica Fire and City Hall =

- U.S. National Register of Historic Places
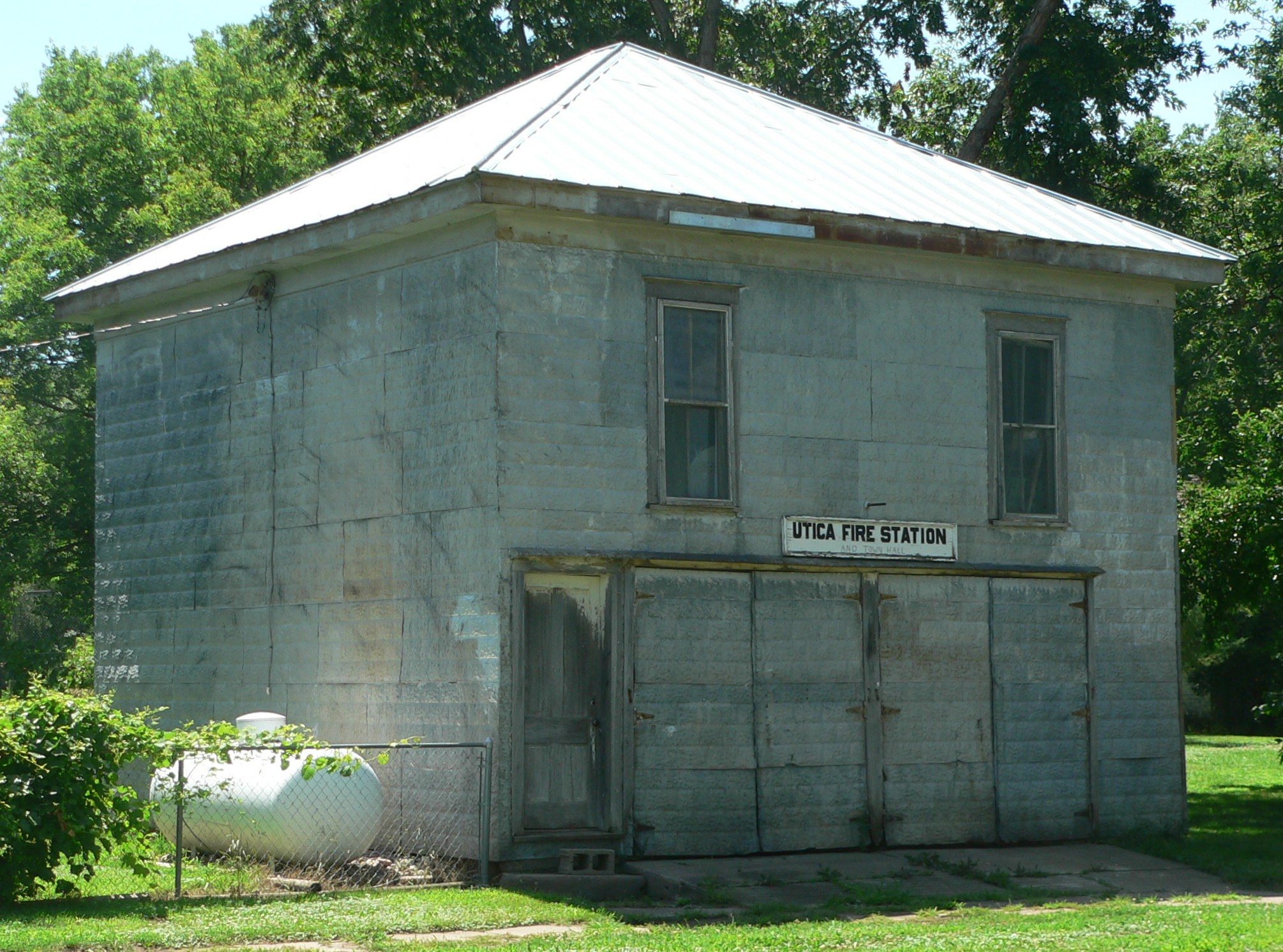

- Location within South Dakota Location within the United States
- Location: In Utica, Utica, South Dakota
- Coordinates: 42°58′50″N 97°29′56″W
- Area: 1 acre (0.40 ha)
- Built: c.1915
- MPS: Northern and Central Townships of Yankton MRA
- NRHP reference No.: 80004591
- Added to NRHP: April 16, 1980

The Utica Fire and City Hall in Utica, South Dakota was built around 1915. It was listed on the National Register of Historic Places in 1980.

It is a two-story building with stamp metal facing upon a stone foundation, with a hipped roof. It has two fire doors. In 1980, the building still contained "four fire carts, with wooden wheels manufactured by the W.S. Knott Company of Minneapolis, Minnesota"; "these objects are more scarce than the building itself."
