= Fred Schnauber House =

- U.S. National Register of Historic Places
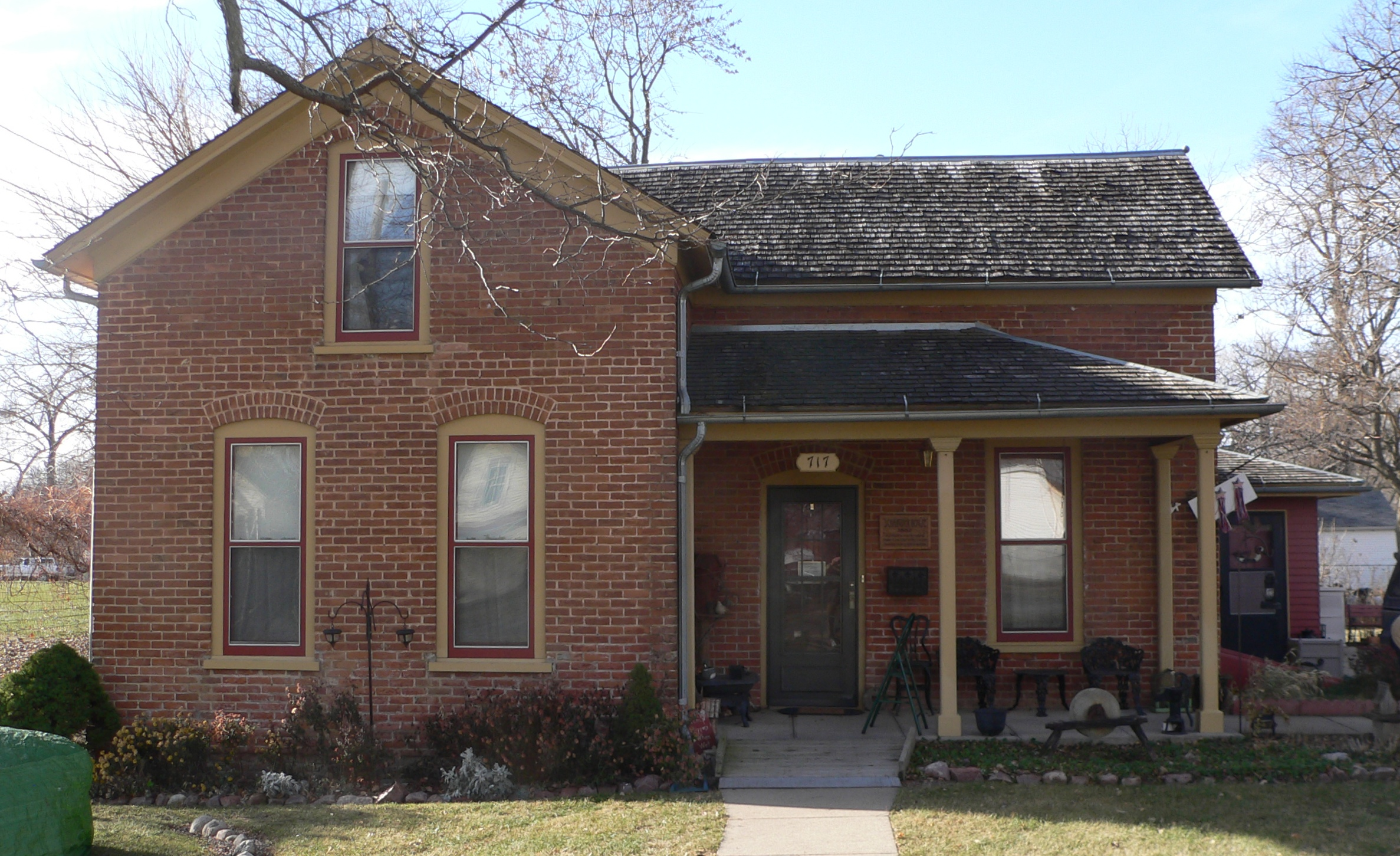
- The house in 2010

- Location within South Dakota Location within the United States
- Location: 717 Walnut Street, Yankton, South Dakota
- Coordinates: 42°52′34″N 97°23′37″W
- Area: less than one acre
- Built: 1886
- NRHP reference No.: 85000185
- Added to NRHP: January 31, 1985

The Fred Schnauber House is a historic house in Yankton, South Dakota. It was built in 1886 as a boarding house for Fred Schnauber's employees as well as railroad workers. Schnauber was a brewer and a bottler; he died in the 1920s. The house was later purchased by Martin Rathjen, and inherited by her great-nephew, John Coates, in the 1970s. It has been listed on the National Register of Historic Places since January 31, 1985.
