= United Church of Christ (Mission Hill, South Dakota) =

Historic church in South Dakota, United States

- U.S. National Register of Historic Places
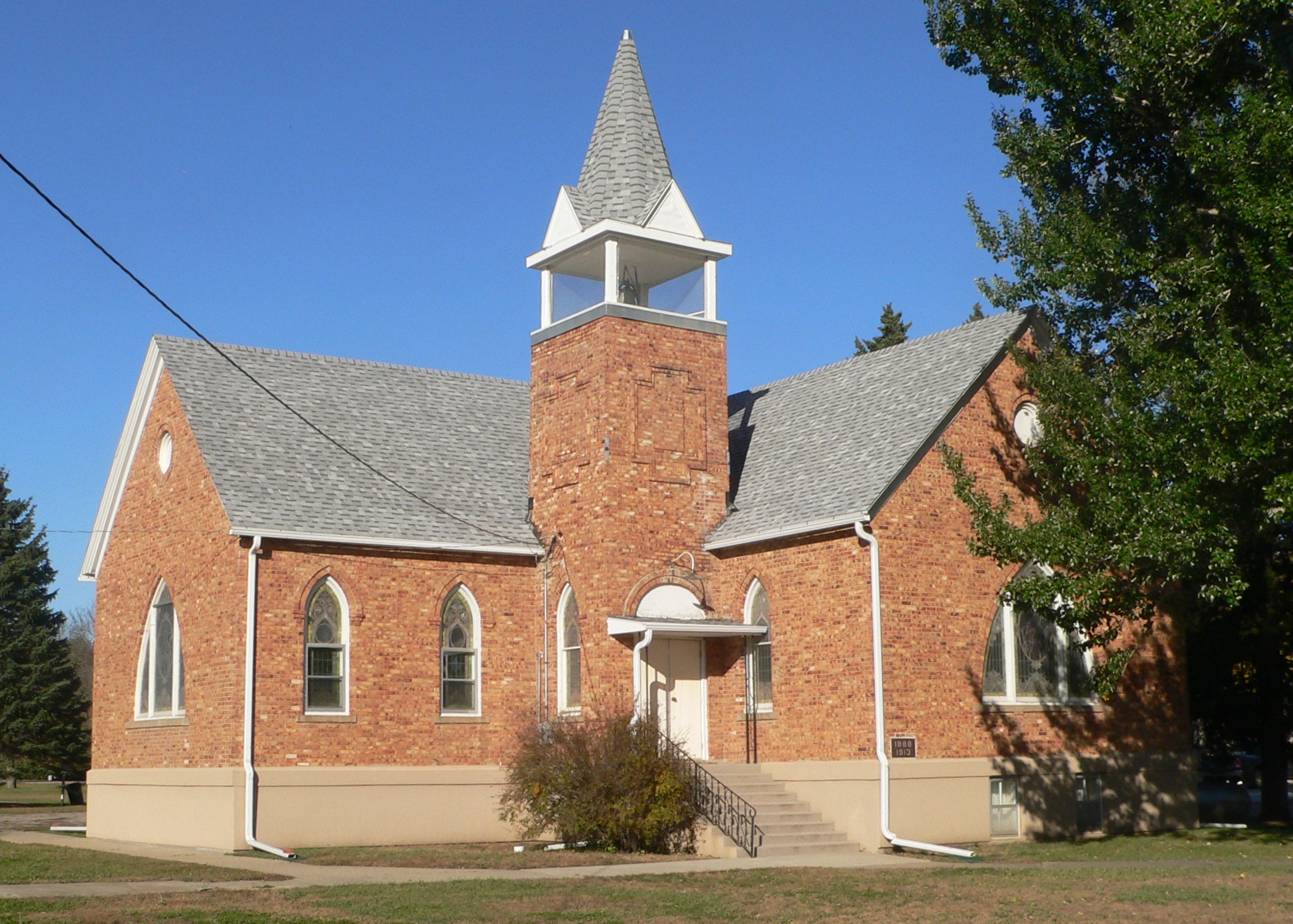

- Location within South Dakota Location within the United States
- Location: Mission Hill, South Dakota
- Coordinates: 42.923844°N 97.279328°W
- Built: 1913
- MPS: Northern and Central Townships of Yankton MRA
- NRHP reference No.: 80003746
- Added to NRHP: April 16, 1980

The United Church of Christ in Mission Hill, South Dakota is a church which was built in 1913. It was added to the National Register of Historic Places in 1980.

== Description ==
It is an L-shaped church with a square tower in the elbow of the plan.

== History ==
The property was deeded to the church in 1889, and a first church was built on the location thereafter. The present church is a replacement for the first building.
