= Lakeport Church (Yankton County, South Dakota) =

Historic church in South Dakota, United States

- Old Catholic Church
- U.S. National Register of Historic Places
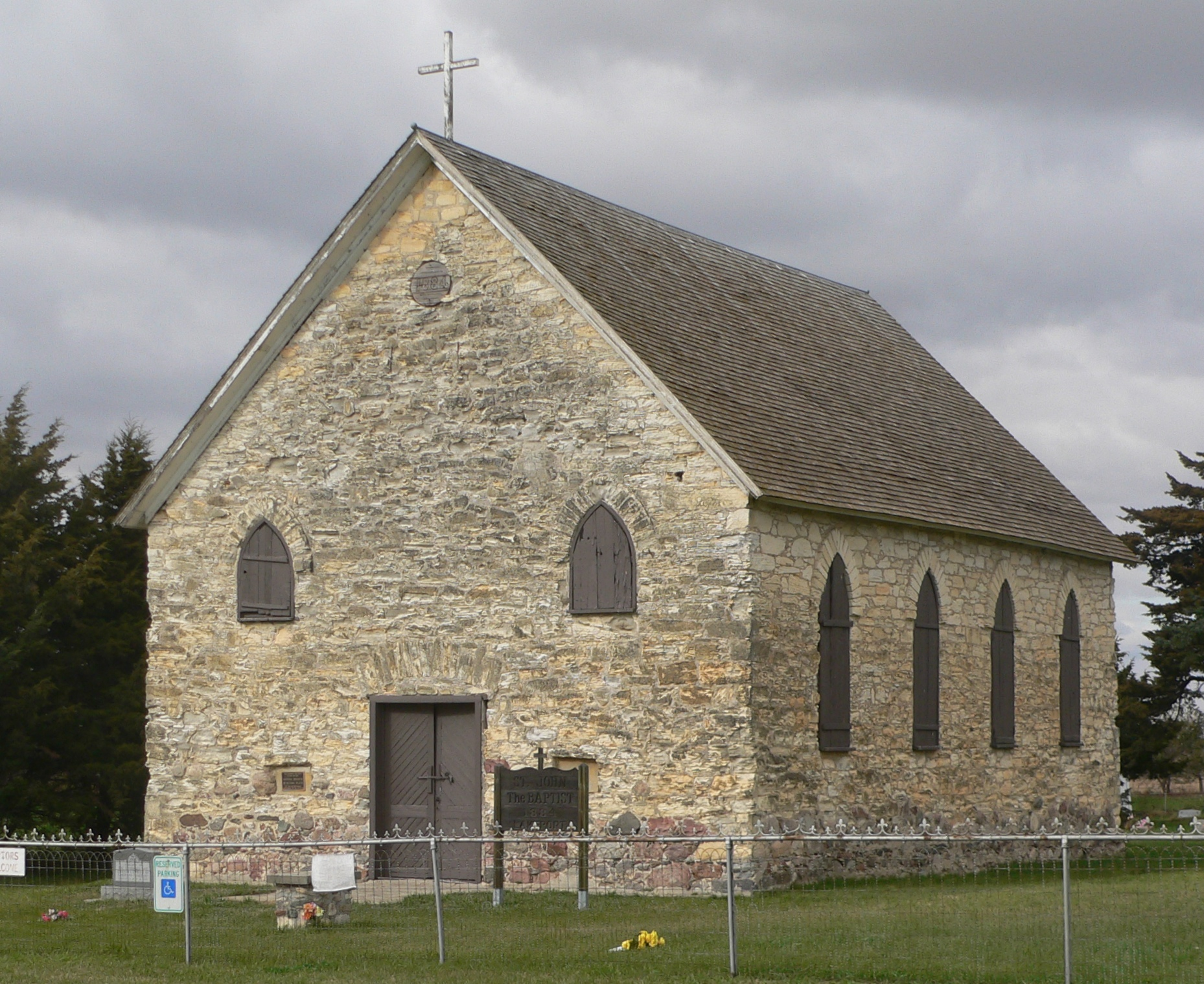

- Location within South Dakota
- Location: Yankton County, South Dakota
- Coordinates: 42.914568°N 97.582911°W
- Built: 1884
- Architectural style: Gothic revival
- NRHP reference No.: 80003776
- Added to NRHP: 1980

Saint John the Baptist Church, commonly known as Lakeport Church, is a stone church located in rural Yankton County in the state of South Dakota in the Midwestern United States. It was built in 1884 and served a predominantly Czech Catholic parish until 1903. In 1980, it was listed in the National Register of Historic Places.

== History ==
In 1859, brothers George and Parker V. Brown moved from Vermillion in the Dakota Territory to "a beautiful and sightly location ten miles [about 15 km] from Yankton", which they dubbed "Lakeport", and where they built a log hotel.

In 1868, a group of Czechs living in Chicago established the Czech Agricultural Society, with the purpose of promoting Czech settlement in the regions west of Iowa and Minnesota. A year later, the organization's first expedition arrived in the vicinity of Yankton. Finding most of the land there already occupied, they moved further west, where some of them settled near Lakeport. There, they built the Church of St. John the Baptist, the Dakota Territory's first Czech Catholic church.

In 1882, construction began on a new St. John the Baptist church, located closer to Lakeport. Since timber was scarce on the prairie, the church was built out of chalkrock, quarried from the banks of the Missouri River to the south. Construction took two years; the church was opened in 1884.

After 1903, the church no longer had an assigned priest, and its parishioners moved to churches in Tabor, Lesterville, or Yankton. The church was essentially abandoned and began to deteriorate, despite some maintenance by local residents. After many years, a grant was secured from the South Dakota Historical Society to assist in the restoration of the building. In 1984, a Mass was held for the church's centennial; annual Masses were celebrated thereafter.

In 1980, the church was listed in the National Register of Historic Places, under the name "Old Catholic Church".

== Architecture ==
The church is built out of chalkrock blocks 2–3 feet (60–90 cm) thick. It is a one-story building with a gable roof. There are tall narrow lancet windows on the sides of the building, half-story windows on the front and back, and ocular windows in the gable ends. In its nomination to the National Register, the building was described as "an excellent example of Gothic style, ethnically interpreted".

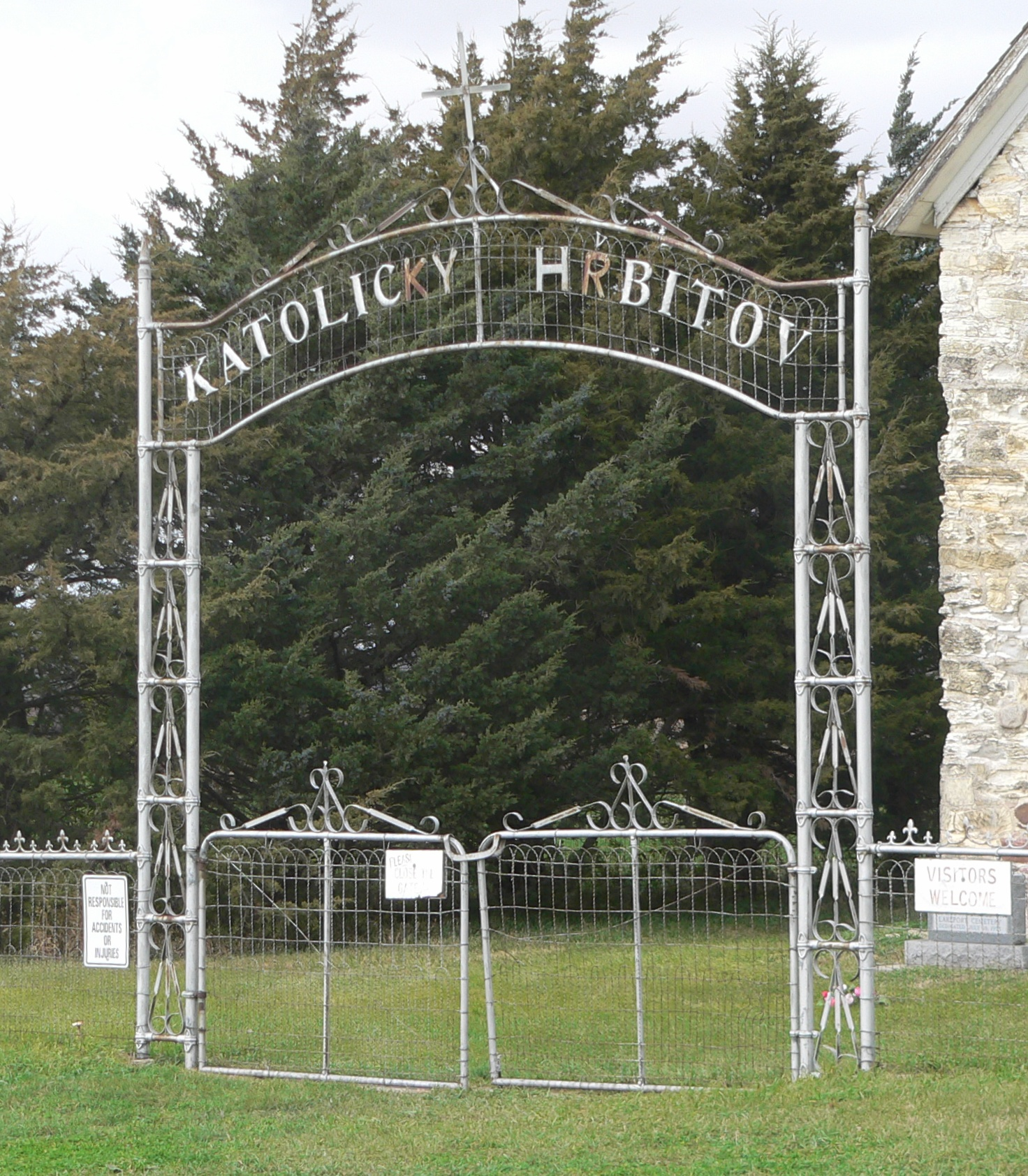
Cemetery gate with Czech inscription
