= Schaffer Farmstead =

- U.S. National Register of Historic Places
- Location within South Dakota Location within the United States
- Location: N of Yankton, off US 81, Yankton, South Dakota
- Coordinates: 42°55′53″N 97°22′42″W
- Area: 2 acres (0.81 ha)
- Built: 1889
- Architectural style: Vernacular Italianate
- MPS: Northern and Central Townships of Yankton MRA
- NRHP reference No.: 80003777
- Added to NRHP: April 16, 1980

The Schaffer Farmstead is a historic house in Yankton, South Dakota. It was built in 1889, and designed in the vernacular Italianate architectural style. The original homestead was established by Frank Schaffer in 1873. It has been listed on the National Register of Historic Places since April 16, 1980.
