= Gordon House (Irene, South Dakota) =

- U.S. National Register of Historic Places
- Location within South Dakota Location within the United States
- Location: N of SD 46, Irene, South Dakota
- Coordinates: 43°06′03″N 97°19′13″W
- Area: 4 acres (1.6 ha)
- Built: 1885
- MPS: Northern and Central Townships of Yankton MRA
- NRHP reference No.: 80003736
- Added to NRHP: April 16, 1980

The Gordon House is a historic house in Irene, South Dakota. It was built in 1885 with bricks from Yankton. It is the only property with double walls in Irene, and there are hood moulds. It has been listed on the National Register of Historic Places since April 16, 1980.
