= Burns House (Yankton, South Dakota) =

- U.S. National Register of Historic Places
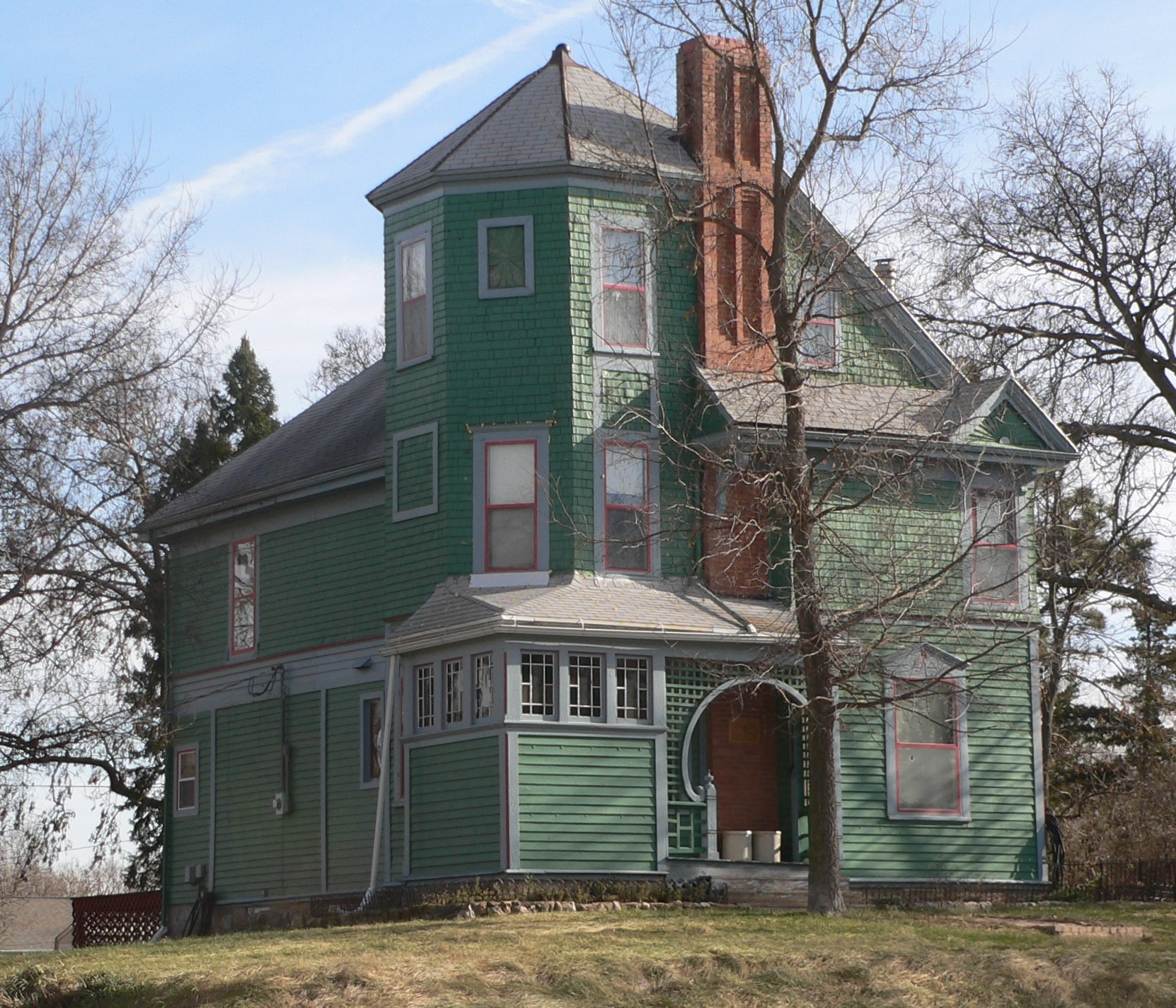
- The house in 2010

- Location within South Dakota Location within the United States
- Location: 816 Pine Street, Yankton, South Dakota
- Coordinates: 42°52′39″N 97°23′18″W
- Area: less than one acre
- Built: 1886
- Architectural style: Queen Anne
- NRHP reference No.: 01000094
- Added to NRHP: February 9, 2001

The Burns House is a historic house in Yankton, South Dakota. It was built in 1886 for Robert Burns, a banker who served as the president of the Mortgage Bank. It was acquired by George Durand, the vice president of Yankton College, in the 1900s. Durand and his wife were art collectors. The house was designed in the Queen Anne architectural style, with a tower. It has been listed on the National Register of Historic Places since February 9, 2001.
