= Vangen Church (South Dakota) =

Historic church in South Dakota, United States

- U.S. National Register of Historic Places
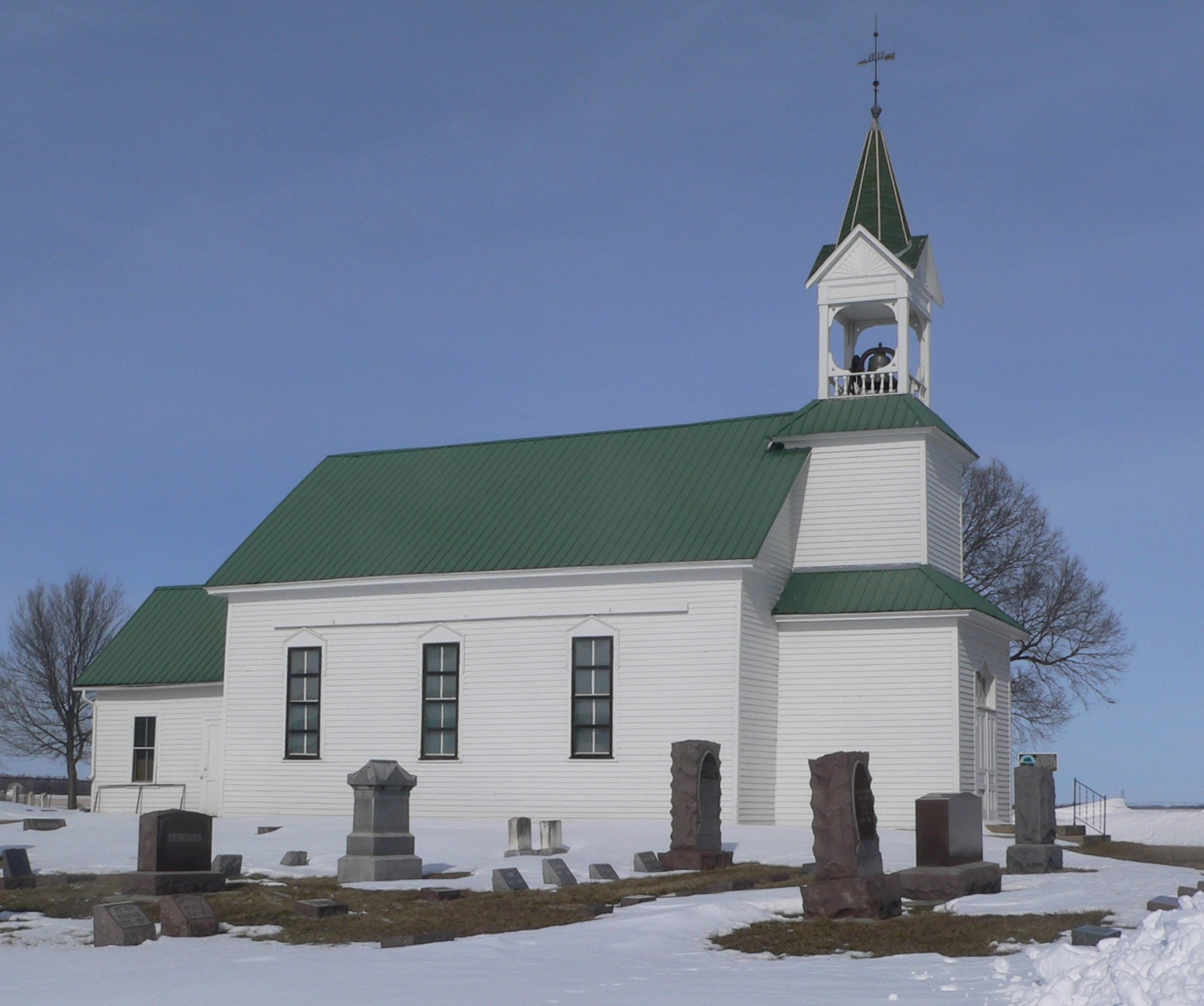
- The church seen from the south-southeast

- Location within South Dakota Location within the United States
- Location: Mission Hill, South Dakota
- Coordinates: 42°55′34″N 97°15′52″W
- Built: 1896
- MPS: Northern and Central Townships of Yankton MRA
- NRHP reference No.: 80003748
- Added to NRHP: April 16, 1980

The Vangen Church near Mission Hill, South Dakota was built in 1896. It was added to the National Register of Historic Places in 1980.

Its weather vane is dated 1869 but it stands on a Queen Anne-style belfry that was built at a later date.

It has also been known as the Vangen Norwegian Evangelical Lutheran Church and, when listed, was believed to be the oldest Lutheran Church building surviving in the Dakotas.
