= Emma Petznick and Otto Schade House =

Historic house in North Dakota, United States

- U.S. National Register of Historic Places
- Location within North Dakota Location within the United States
- Location: 406 W. Divide, Bowman, North Dakota
- Coordinates: 46°11′2″N 103°24′3″W
- Area: less than one acre
- Built: 1919
- Architectural style: Prairie School
- NRHP reference No.: 08000313
- Added to NRHP: April 16, 2008

The Emma Petznick and Otto Schade House in Bowman, North Dakota, United States, is a Prairie School house built in 1919. It was listed on the National Register of Historic Places in 2008. It has also been known as the Opal Burns Home, as the H.A. Blocker House, and as the G.A. Tembreull House.

It was the longtime home of Opal Anderson Burns, granddaughter of Otto and Emma.

By 1908 or 1909, the Otto Schade family had four children and lived in a sod house, in front of which they were photographed.
