= Yankton County, South Dakota =

County in South Dakota, United States

- County
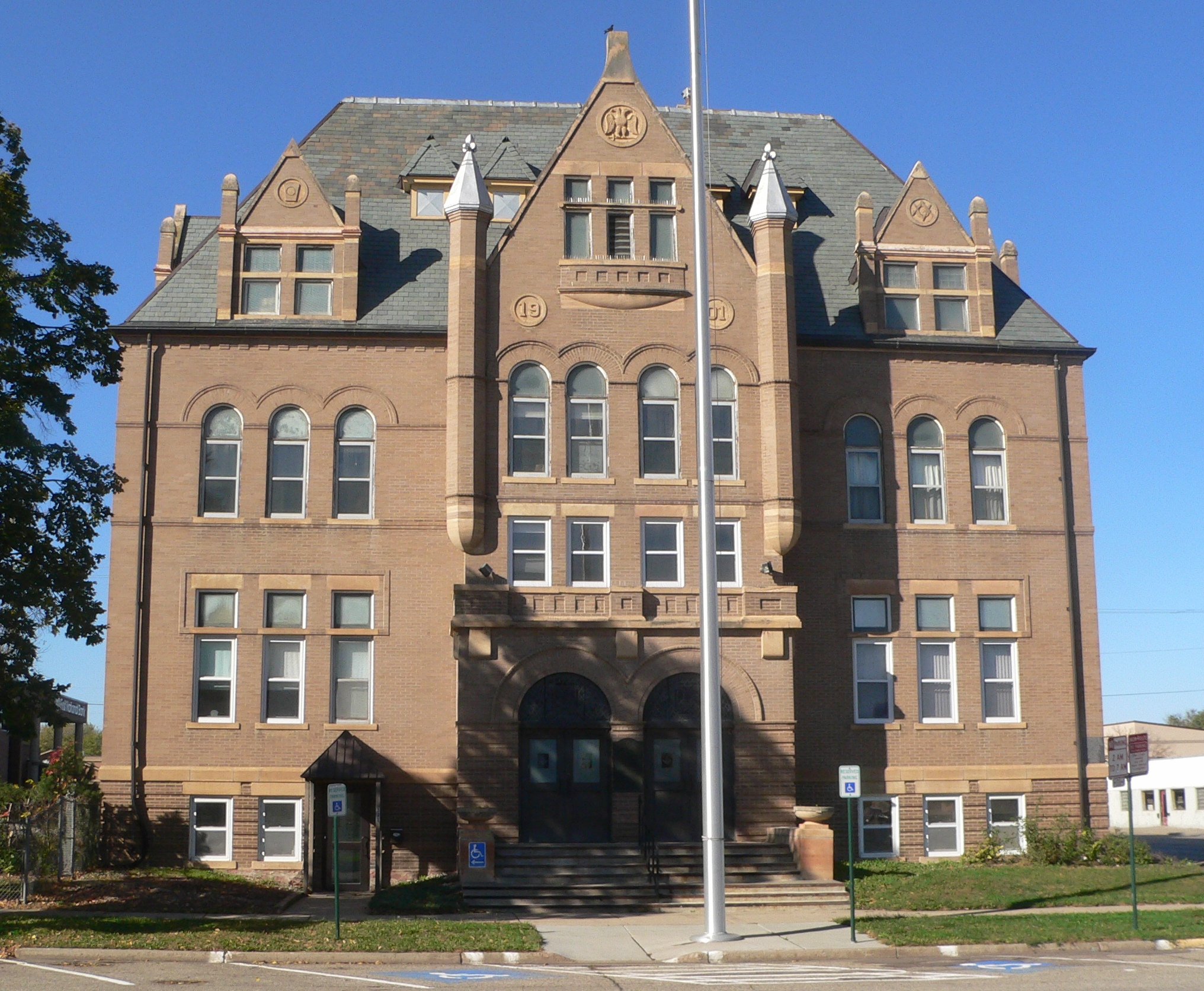
- Scottish Rite Masonic Center in Yankton.

- Location within the U.S. state of South Dakota
- Coordinates: 43°01′N 97°23′W
- Country: United States
- State: South Dakota
- Founded: April 10, 1862
- Named for: Yankton Sioux
- Seat: Yankton
- Largest city: Yankton

Area
  - Total: 532 sq mi (1,380 km^{2})
  - Land: 521 sq mi (1,350 km^{2})
  - Water: 11 sq mi (28 km^{2}) 2.1%

Population (2020)
  - Total: 23,310
  - Estimate (2025): 23,635 ▲
  - Density: 45.4/sq mi (17.5/km^{2})
- Time zone: UTC−6 (Central)
  - Summer (DST): UTC−5 (CDT)
- Congressional district: At-large
- Website: www.co.yankton.sd.us

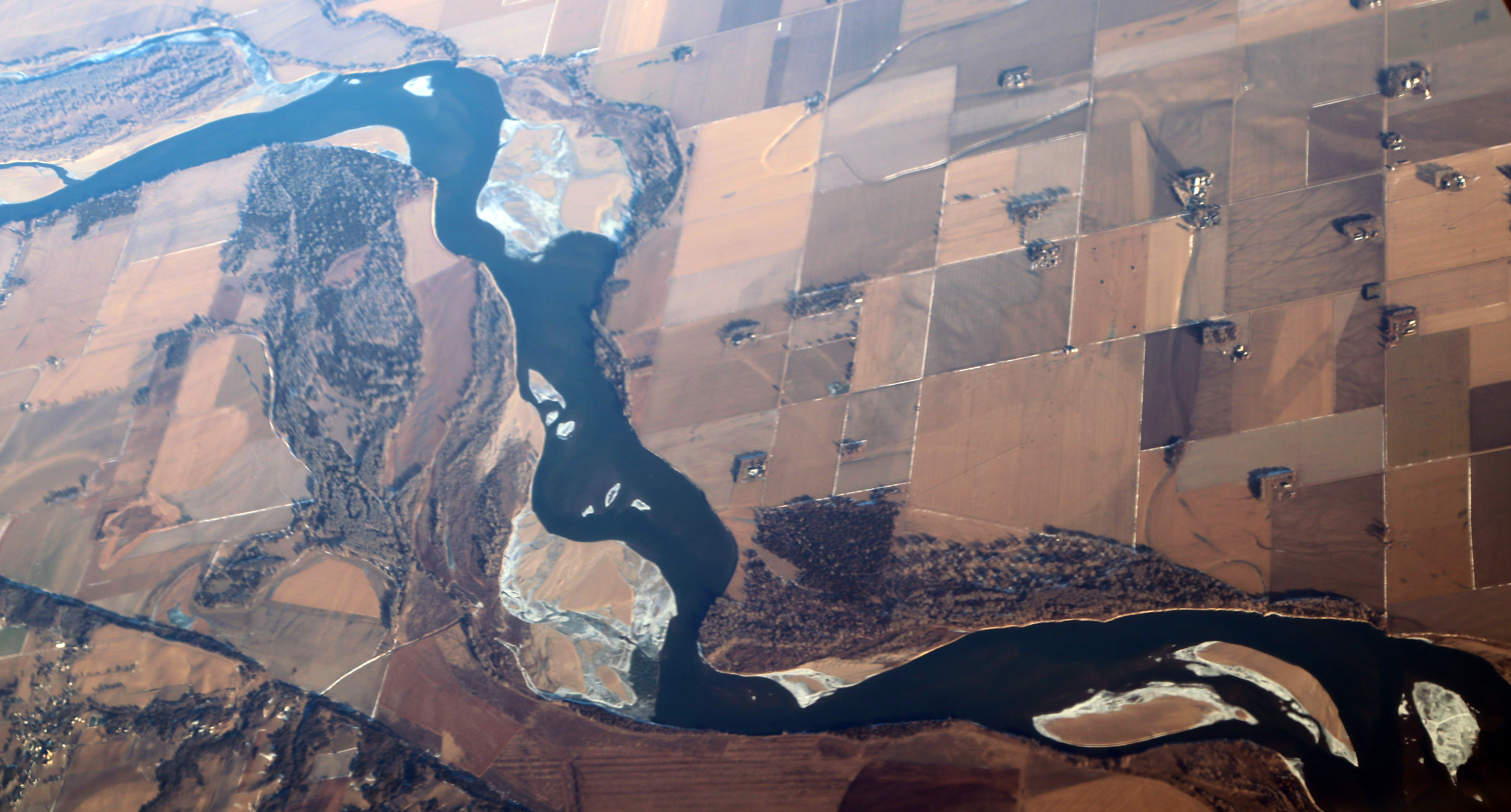
Missouri River in winter downstream from Yankton, with Nebraska below and South Dakota above. This stretch of the river is part of the 59-mile reach of the Missouri National Recreational River.

Yankton County is a county in the U.S. state of South Dakota. As of the 2020 census, the population was 23,310, making it the 9th most populous county in South Dakota. Its county seat is Yankton. Yankton County comprises the Yankton, SD Micropolitan Statistical Area.

== Geography ==
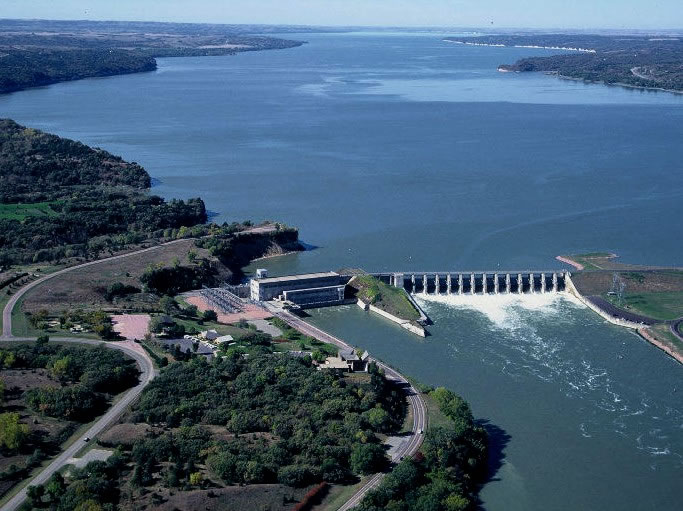
Gavins Point Dam, impounding Lewis and Clark Lake on the Missouri River in the southwestern part of Yankton County.

View of Lewis and Clark Lake from Lewis & Clark Recreation Area along the South Dakota shore, west of Yankton.

Yankton County lies on the south side of South Dakota. Its south boundary line abuts the north boundary line of the state of Nebraska (across the Missouri River). The Missouri flows eastward along the county's south border. The James River flows south-southeastward through the west central portion of the county, discharging into the Missouri near the midpoint of the county's south line. The county terrain consists of rolling hills, carved by creeks and drainages, hosting several lakes and ponds. The area is devoted to agriculture. The terrain slopes to the south and the east. Its highest point is 1,473 ft (449 m) ASL, on the eastern portion of its north boundary line. The county has a total area of 532 square miles (1,380 km^{2}), of which 521 square miles (1,350 km^{2}) is land and 11 square miles (28 km^{2}) (2.1%) is water.

Lewis & Clark Lake, a popular regional tourist and recreational destination is found in the southwestern part of the county.

=== Major highways ===
- U.S. Highway 81
- South Dakota Highway 46
- South Dakota Highway 50
- South Dakota Highway 52
- South Dakota Highway 153
- South Dakota Highway 314

=== Airports ===
- Chan Gurney Municipal Airport

=== Adjacent counties ===
- Turner County – northeast
- Clay County – east
- Cedar County, Nebraska – southeast
- Knox County, Nebraska – southwest
- Bon Homme County – west
- Hutchinson County – northwest

=== Protected areas ===
- Chief White Crane State Recreation Area
- Dakota Territorial Capitol Building/Riverside Park
- Diede Waterfowl Production Area
- Edelman Waterfowl Production Area
- Gavins Point National Fish Hatchery
- Hansen Waterfowl Production Area
- Lewis & Clark State Recreation Area
- Missouri National Recreational River (part)
- Pierson Ranch State Recreation Area

=== Lakes and reservoirs ===
- Beaver Lake
- Guthmiller Lake
- Lake Yankton
- Lewis and Clark Lake (part)
- Marindahl Lake

== Demographics ==
Historical population
Census	Pop.	Note	%±
1870	2,097		—
1880	8,390		300.1%
1890	10,414		24.1%
1900	12,649		21.5%
1910	13,135		3.8%
1920	15,233		16.0%
1930	16,589		8.9%
1940	16,725		0.8%
1950	16,804		0.5%
1960	17,551		4.4%
1970	19,039		8.5%
1980	18,952		−0.5%
1990	19,252		1.6%
2000	21,652		12.5%
2010	22,438		3.6%
2020	23,310		3.9%
2025 (est.)	23,635	▲	1.4%
U.S. Decennial Census:

=== 2020 census ===
As of the 2020 census, there were 23,310 people, 9,435 households, and 5,693 families in the county. Of the residents, 21.1% were under the age of 18 and 20.4% were 65 years of age or older; the median age was 42.3 years. For every 100 females there were 103.8 males, and for every 100 females age 18 and over there were 104.4 males.

The population density was 44.7 inhabitants per square mile (17.3/km^{2}). There were 10,372 housing units, of which 9.0% were vacant. Among occupied housing units, 67.7% were owner-occupied and 32.3% were renter-occupied. The homeowner vacancy rate was 1.7% and the rental vacancy rate was 8.1%.

The racial makeup of the county was 88.3% White, 1.4% Black or African American, 3.0% American Indian and Alaska Native, 0.6% Asian, 2.2% from some other race, and 4.6% from two or more races. Hispanic or Latino residents of any race comprised 5.3% of the population.

There were 9,435 households in the county, of which 25.8% had children under the age of 18 living with them and 24.2% had a female householder with no spouse or partner present. About 33.5% of all households were made up of individuals and 13.9% had someone living alone who was 65 years of age or older.

=== 2010 census ===
As of the 2010 census, there were 22,438 people, 8,770 households, and 5,476 families in the county. The population density was 43.1 inhabitants per square mile (16.6/km^{2}). There were 9,652 housing units at an average density of 18.5 per square mile (7.1/km^{2}). The racial makeup of the county was 92.8% white, 2.5% American Indian, 1.5% black or African American, 0.5% Asian, 1.1% from other races, and 1.4% from two or more races. Those of Hispanic or Latino origin made up 2.7% of the population. In terms of ancestry.

Of the 8,770 households, 29.2% had children under the age of 18 living with them, 50.1% were married couples living together, 8.8% had a female householder with no husband present, 37.6% were non-families, and 32.0% of all households were made up of individuals. The average household size was 2.30 and the average family size was 2.90. The median age was 41.3 years.

The median income for a household in the county was $47,124 and the median income for a family was $62,070. Males had a median income of $37,637 versus $29,488 for females. The per capita income for the county was $24,776. About 5.0% of families and 11.2% of the population were below the poverty line, including 10.7% of those under age 18 and 13.5% of those age 65 or over.

== Communities ==
=== Cities ===
- Irene (partial)
- Yankton (county seat)

=== Towns ===
- Gayville
- Lesterville
- Mission Hill
- Utica
- Volin

=== Census-designated place ===
- Jamesville Colony

=== Townships ===
- Gayville
- Jamesville
- Marindahl
- Mayfield
- Mission Hill
- Turkey Valley
- Utica
- Volin
- Walshtown

=== Unorganized territories ===
- Southeast Yankton
- West Yankton

== Politics and government ==
Yankton County is Governed by the County Commission, a five-member legislative body elected at-large. The current commissioners are:

- John Marquardt, Chairman
- Wanda Howey-Fox, Vice Chairman
- Don Kettering
- Ryan Heine
- Dan Klimisch

The county is located in South Dakota Legislative District 18. As of 2024, Yankton County is represented in the South Dakota Senate by Senator Jean Hunhoff-(R), and in the South Dakota House of Representatives by State Representatives Mike Stevens-(R) and Ryan Cwach-(D). The county is located in South Dakota's At-Large Congressional District, currently held by Republican Dusty Johnson.

In national elections, Yankton County voters have been reliably Republican for several decades. In no national election since 1964 has the county selected the Democratic Party candidate.

United States presidential election results for Yankton County, South Dakota
Year	Republican		Democratic		Third party(ies)	
Year	No.	%	No.	%	No.	%
1892	1,166	53.98%	228	10.56%	766	35.46%
1896	1,423	51.39%	1,330	48.03%	16	0.58%
1900	1,639	55.75%	1,268	43.13%	33	1.12%
1904	1,968	69.03%	788	27.64%	95	3.33%
1908	1,644	56.81%	1,118	38.63%	132	4.56%
1912	0	0.00%	1,289	44.02%	1,639	55.98%
1916	1,429	48.66%	1,438	48.96%	70	2.38%
1920	2,555	61.80%	1,147	27.75%	432	10.45%
1924	1,504	39.78%	693	18.33%	1,584	41.89%
1928	2,971	50.88%	2,841	48.66%	27	0.46%
1932	1,693	25.16%	4,930	73.25%	107	1.59%
1936	2,702	36.33%	4,349	58.47%	387	5.20%
1940	4,179	57.70%	3,064	42.30%	0	0.00%
1944	3,313	58.41%	2,359	41.59%	0	0.00%
1948	2,904	49.28%	2,932	49.75%	57	0.97%
1952	4,802	68.39%	2,220	31.61%	0	0.00%
1956	4,063	57.63%	2,987	42.37%	0	0.00%
1960	4,065	57.04%	3,061	42.96%	0	0.00%
1964	3,208	46.13%	3,747	53.87%	0	0.00%
1968	3,977	56.08%	2,733	38.54%	382	5.39%
1972	4,366	53.08%	3,835	46.63%	24	0.29%
1976	4,029	49.82%	3,987	49.30%	71	0.88%
1980	5,355	61.22%	2,698	30.84%	694	7.93%
1984	5,161	63.36%	2,932	36.00%	52	0.64%
1988	4,186	52.05%	3,777	46.96%	80	0.99%
1992	3,430	36.60%	3,404	36.32%	2,538	27.08%
1996	3,885	44.02%	3,775	42.77%	1,166	13.21%
2000	4,904	56.11%	3,596	41.14%	240	2.75%
2004	6,003	57.55%	4,237	40.62%	191	1.83%
2008	5,039	49.72%	4,838	47.74%	257	2.54%
2012	5,495	55.09%	4,226	42.37%	253	2.54%
2016	5,659	58.81%	3,301	34.30%	663	6.89%
2020	6,581	60.38%	4,016	36.84%	303	2.78%
2024	6,650	61.39%	3,883	35.85%	299	2.76%

The Yankton County Sheriff's Office provides law enforcement in the county and operates the 120-bed county jail. As of 2021 the current Sheriff is Preston Crissey.

== Recreation and tourism ==
Lewis and Clark Lake is located in southwestern Yankton County, four miles (6.4 km) west of Yankton. The Lewis & Clark Lake area is a popular regional tourist and recreation destination with parks, trails, campgrounds, boat ramps, and marinas. Gavins Point Dam, which creates Lewis & Clark Lake, is a popular fishing destination on the Missouri River. The South Dakota Department of Game, Fish, and Parks operates the Lewis & Clark State Recreation Area on the northern shore of the lake.

Below Gavins Point Dam, the Missouri National Recreational River is home to one of the few non-channelized portions of the "Big Muddy", and is popular with birdwatchers, hunters, canoers, and kayakers.

== Education ==
School districts include:

- Bon Homme School District 04-2
- Gayville-Volin School District 63-1
- Irene-Wakonda School District 13-3
- Menno School District 33-2
- Scotland School District 04-3
- Viborg Hurley School District 60-6
- Yankton School District 63-3

Former school districts:

- Viborg School District 60-5. - Merged into Viborg Hurley in 2013.

== See also ==
- National Register of Historic Places listings in Yankton County, South Dakota
