= Irene, South Dakota =

- City
- Location in Clay County and the state of South Dakota
- Coordinates: 43°05′01″N 97°09′27″W
- Country: United States
- State: South Dakota
- Counties: Turner, Clay, Yankton
- Incorporated: 1895

Area
  - Total: 0.25 sq mi (0.66 km^{2})
  - Land: 0.25 sq mi (0.66 km^{2})
  - Water: 0 sq mi (0.00 km^{2})
- Elevation: 1,394 ft (425 m)

Population (2020)
  - Total: 422
  - Density: 1,653.2/sq mi (638.32/km^{2})
- Time zone: UTC-6 (Central (CST))
  - Summer (DST): UTC-5 (CDT)
- ZIP code: 57037
- Area code: 605
- FIPS code: 46-31940
- GNIS feature ID: 1267437
- Website: www.irenesd.com

Irene is a city in Clay, Turner, and Yankton counties in South Dakota, United States. The population was 422 at the 2020 census. The portion of Irene that is located in Turner County is a part of the Sioux Falls, South Dakota metropolitan area, the portion located in Yankton County is part of the Yankton Micropolitan Statistical Area, and the portion located in Clay County is part of both the Vermillion Micropolitan Statistical Area and the Sioux City-Vermillion Combined Statistical Area. Irene is also host to the Irene Rodeo, held every summer.

Irene was laid out in 1893, and named after Irene Fry, the daughter of a first settler.

== Geography ==
According to the United States Census Bureau, the city has a total area of 0.26 square miles (0.67 km^{2}), all land.

South Dakota Highway 46 runs east–west through the city. Irene is located approximately 18 miles west of I-29.

== Demographics ==
Historical population
Census	Pop.	Note	%±
1900	229		—
1910	263		14.8%
1920	446		69.6%
1930	491		10.1%
1940	391		−20.4%
1950	374		−4.3%
1960	399		6.7%
1970	461		15.5%
1980	523		13.4%
1990	464		−11.3%
2000	432		−6.9%
2010	420		−2.8%
2020	422		0.5%
U.S. Decennial Census

=== 2020 census ===
As of the 2020 census, Irene had a population of 422. The median age was 42.5 years. 23.9% of residents were under the age of 18 and 22.0% of residents were 65 years of age or older. For every 100 females there were 114.2 males, and for every 100 females age 18 and over there were 114.0 males age 18 and over.

0.0% of residents lived in urban areas, while 100.0% lived in rural areas.

There were 166 households in Irene, of which 29.5% had children under the age of 18 living in them. Of all households, 41.0% were married-couple households, 24.7% were households with a male householder and no spouse or partner present, and 25.3% were households with a female householder and no spouse or partner present. About 38.6% of all households were made up of individuals and 14.4% had someone living alone who was 65 years of age or older.

There were 190 housing units, of which 12.6% were vacant. The homeowner vacancy rate was 1.7% and the rental vacancy rate was 10.0%.

Racial composition as of the 2020 census
Race	Number	Percent
White	394	93.4%
Black or African American	0	0.0%
American Indian and Alaska Native	12	2.8%
Asian	2	0.5%
Native Hawaiian and Other Pacific Islander	0	0.0%
Some other race	8	1.9%
Two or more races	6	1.4%
Hispanic or Latino (of any race)	11	2.6%

=== 2010 census ===
As of the census of 2010, there were 420 people, 172 households, and 102 families residing in the city. The population density was 1,615.4 inhabitants per square mile (623.7/km^{2}). There were 194 housing units at an average density of 746.2 per square mile (288.1/km^{2}). The racial makeup of the city was 98.6% White, 0.7% Native American, 0.2% Asian, 0.2% from other races, and 0.2% from two or more races. Hispanic or Latino of any race were 0.5% of the population.

There were 172 households, of which 29.7% had children under the age of 18 living with them, 44.2% were married couples living together, 9.9% had a female householder with no husband present, 5.2% had a male householder with no wife present, and 40.7% were non-families. 35.5% of all households were made up of individuals, and 15.7% had someone living alone who was 65 years of age or older. The average household size was 2.18 and the average family size was 2.78.

The median age in the city was 43.1 years. 22.6% of residents were under the age of 18; 5% were between the ages of 18 and 24; 25.2% were from 25 to 44; 26.4% were from 45 to 64; and 20.7% were 65 years of age or older. The gender makeup of the city was 44.0% male and 56.0% female.

=== 2000 census ===
As of the census of 2000, there were 432 people, 169 households, and 110 families residing in the city. The population density was 1,790.0 inhabitants per square mile (691.1/km^{2}). There were 189 housing units at an average density of 783.1 per square mile (302.4/km^{2}). The racial makeup of the city was 99.77% White and 0.23% Native American.

There were 169 households, out of which 26.0% had children under the age of 18 living with them, 56.8% were married couples living together, 7.1% had a female householder with no husband present, and 34.9% were non-families. 32.5% of all households were made up of individuals, and 19.5% had someone living alone who was 65 years of age or older. The average household size was 2.21 and the average family size was 2.76.

In the city, the population was spread out, with 19.7% under the age of 18, 6.9% from 18 to 24, 20.1% from 25 to 44, 22.0% from 45 to 64, and 31.3% who were 65 years of age or older. The median age was 47 years. For every 100 females, there were 79.3 males. For every 100 females age 18 and over, there were 70.9 males.

The median income for a household in the city was $30,500, and the median income for a family was $39,688. Males had a median income of $29,583 versus $20,000 for females. The per capita income for the city was $14,983. About 4.7% of families and 9.0% of the population were below the poverty line, including 10.8% of those under age 18 and 11.8% of those age 65 or over.

== Education ==
The school district is Irene-Wakonda School District 13-3.

== See also ==
- List of cities in South Dakota
