= Utica, South Dakota =

- Town
- Location in Yankton County and the state of South Dakota
- Coordinates: 42°58′52″N 97°29′54″W
- Country: United States
- State: South Dakota
- County: Yankton

Area
  - Total: 0.26 sq mi (0.68 km^{2})
  - Land: 0.26 sq mi (0.68 km^{2})
  - Water: 0 sq mi (0.00 km^{2})
- Elevation: 1,365 ft (416 m)

Population (2020)
  - Total: 70
  - Density: 265.3/sq mi (102.43/km^{2})
- Time zone: UTC-6 (Central (CST))
  - Summer (DST): UTC-5 (CDT)
- ZIP code: 57067
- Area code: 605
- FIPS code: 46-65780
- GNIS feature ID: 1267609
- Website: uticasd.com

Utica is a town in Yankton County, South Dakota, United States. The population was 70 at the 2020 census.

Some say Utica is a name derived from the Sioux language meaning "dweller", while others believe the name is a transfer from Utica, New York.

== Geography ==
According to the United States Census Bureau, the town has a total area of 0.26 square miles (0.67 km^{2}), all land.

== Demographics ==
Historical population
Census	Pop.	Note	%±
1910	103		—
1920	141		36.9%
1930	98		−30.5%
1940	95		−3.1%
1950	84		−11.6%
1960	70		−16.7%
1970	89		27.1%
1980	100		12.4%
1990	115		15.0%
2000	86		−25.2%
2010	65		−24.4%
2020	70		7.7%
U.S. Decennial Census

=== 2010 census ===
As of the census of 2010, there were 65 people, 31 households, and 16 families residing in the town. The population density was 250.0 inhabitants per square mile (96.5/km^{2}). There were 44 housing units at an average density of 169.2 per square mile (65.3/km^{2}). The racial makeup of the town was 86.2% White, 4.6% African American, 1.5% Native American, 4.6% from other races, and 3.1% from two or more races. Hispanic or Latino of any race were 4.6% of the population.

There were 31 households, of which 25.8% had children under the age of 18 living with them, 48.4% were married couples living together, 3.2% had a female householder with no husband present, and 48.4% were non-families. 41.9% of all households were made up of individuals, and 19.4% had someone living alone who was 65 years of age or older. The average household size was 2.10 and the average family size was 3.00.

The median age in the town was 41.5 years. 21.5% of residents were under the age of 18; 6.3% were between the ages of 18 and 24; 26.2% were from 25 to 44; 26.3% were from 45 to 64; and 20% were 65 years of age or older. The gender makeup of the town was 53.8% male and 46.2% female.

=== 2000 census ===
As of the census of 2000, there were 86 people, 39 households, and 18 families residing in the town. The population density was 325.2 inhabitants per square mile (125.6/km^{2}). There were 43 housing units at an average density of 162.6 per square mile (62.8/km^{2}). The racial makeup of the town was 87.21% White, 4.65% Native American, 4.65% from other races, and 3.49% from two or more races. Hispanic or Latino of any race were 1.16% of the population.

There were 39 households, out of which 25.6% had children under the age of 18 living with them, 38.5% were married couples living together, 7.7% had a female householder with no husband present, and 51.3% were non-families. 43.6% of all households were made up of individuals, and 12.8% had someone living alone who was 65 years of age or older. The average household size was 2.21 and the average family size was 3.32.

In the town, the population was spread out, with 25.6% under the age of 18, 10.5% from 18 to 24, 29.1% from 25 to 44, 20.9% from 45 to 64, and 14.0% who were 65 years of age or older. The median age was 34 years. For every 100 females, there were 126.3 males. For every 100 females age 18 and over, there were 120.7 males.

The median income for a household in the town was $25,417, and the median income for a family was $47,500. Males had a median income of $23,750 versus $18,750 for females. The per capita income for the town was $20,057. There were no families and 4.8% of the population living below the poverty line, including no under eighteens and none of those over 64.

== Education ==
It is in the Yankton School District 63-3.
