= Lesterville, South Dakota =

- Town
- Nickname: Lesty
- Location in Yankton County and the state of South Dakota
- Coordinates: 43°02′19″N 97°35′26″W
- Country: United States
- State: South Dakota
- County: Yankton
- Incorporated: 1883

Area
  - Total: 0.20 sq mi (0.52 km^{2})
  - Land: 0.20 sq mi (0.52 km^{2})
  - Water: 0 sq mi (0.00 km^{2})
- Elevation: 1,388 ft (423 m)

Population (2020)
  - Total: 115
  - Density: 570.0/sq mi (220.09/km^{2})
- Time zone: UTC-6 (Central (CST))
  - Summer (DST): UTC-5 (CDT)
- ZIP code: 57040
- Area code: 605
- FIPS code: 46-36540
- GNIS feature ID: 1267461

Lesterville is a town in Yankton County, South Dakota, United States. The population was 115 at the 2020 census.

== History ==
The town is named for Lester Dix, the grandson of an early postmaster.

== Geography ==
According to the United States Census Bureau, the town has a total area of 0.20 square miles (0.52 km^{2}), all land.

== Demographics ==
Historical population
Census	Pop.	Note	%±
1900	244		—
1910	279		14.3%
1920	281		0.7%
1930	228		−18.9%
1940	229		0.4%
1950	192		−16.2%
1960	173		−9.9%
1970	181		4.6%
1980	156		−13.8%
1990	168		7.7%
2000	158		−6.0%
2010	127		−19.6%
2020	115		−9.4%
U.S. Decennial Census

=== 2010 census ===
As of the census of 2010, there were 127 people, 56 households, and 36 families residing in the town. The population density was 635.0 inhabitants per square mile (245.2/km^{2}). There were 68 housing units at an average density of 340.0 units per square mile (131.3 units/km^{2}). The racial makeup of the town was 100.0% White.

There were 56 households, of which 26.8% had children under the age of 18 living with them, 57.1% were married couples living together, 5.4% had a female householder with no husband present, 1.8% had a male householder with no wife present, and 35.7% were non-families. 32.1% of all households were made up of individuals, and 14.3% had someone living alone who was 65 years of age or older. The average household size was 2.27 and the average family size was 2.89.

The median age in the town was 44.5 years. 22.8% of residents were under the age of 18; 6.2% were between the ages of 18 and 24; 22% were from 25 to 44; 29.1% were from 45 to 64; and 19.7% were 65 years of age or older. The gender makeup of the town was 52.0% male and 48.0% female.

=== 2000 census ===
As of the census of 2000, there were 158 people, 63 households, and 45 families residing in the town. The population density was 787.0 inhabitants per square mile (303.9/km^{2}). There were 73 housing units at an average density of 363.6 units per square mile (140.4 units/km^{2}). The racial makeup of the town was 96.20% White, 1.90% Native American, 1.27% from other races, and 0.63% from two or more races. Hispanic or Latino of any race were 1.27% of the population.

There were 63 households, out of which 36.5% had children under the age of 18 living with them, 58.7% were married couples living together, 7.9% had a female householder with no husband present, and 27.0% were non-families. 23.8% of all households were made up of individuals, and 14.3% had someone living alone who was 65 years of age or older. The average household size was 2.51 and the average family size was 2.98.

In the town, the population was spread out, with 29.1% under the age of 18, 2.5% from 18 to 24, 28.5% from 25 to 44, 20.9% from 45 to 64, and 19.0% who were 65 years of age or older. The median age was 36 years. For every 100 females, there were 107.9 males. For every 100 females age 18 and over, there were 100.0 males.

The median income for a household in the town was $41,667, and the median income for a family was $45,833. Males had a median income of $24,464 versus $17,813 for females. The per capita income for the town was $15,487. None of the families and 3.4% of the population were living below the poverty line, including no under eighteens and 18.2% of those over 64.

== Education ==
It is in the Scotland School District 04-3.
