= Mission Hill, South Dakota =

- Town
- Location in Yankton County and the state of South Dakota
- Coordinates: 42°55′15″N 97°16′45″W
- Country: United States
- State: South Dakota
- County: Yankton
- Incorporated: 1913

Area
  - Total: 0.33 sq mi (0.85 km^{2})
  - Land: 0.33 sq mi (0.85 km^{2})
  - Water: 0 sq mi (0.00 km^{2})
- Elevation: 1,184 ft (361 m)

Population (2020)
  - Total: 190
  - Density: 579.2/sq mi (223.62/km^{2})
- Time zone: UTC-6 (Central (CST))
  - Summer (DST): UTC-5 (CDT)
- ZIP code: 57046
- Area code: 605
- FIPS code: 46-42980
- GNIS feature ID: 1267479
- Website: missionhillsd.org

Mission Hill is a town in Yankton County, South Dakota, United States. The population was 190 at the 2020 census.

== History ==
Mission Hill was laid out in 1894. The town was named for a nearby hill where a church stood. A post office called Mission Hill has been in operation since 1892.

== Geography ==
According to the United States Census Bureau, the town has a total area of 0.33 square miles (0.85 km^{2}), all land.

== Demographics ==
Historical population
Census	Pop.	Note	%±
1920	167		—
1930	184		10.2%
1940	195		6.0%
1950	169		−13.3%
1960	165		−2.4%
1970	161		−2.4%
1980	197		22.4%
1990	180		−8.6%
2000	183		1.7%
2010	177		−3.3%
2020	190		7.3%

=== 2010 census ===
As of the census of 2010, there were 177 people, 69 households, and 51 families residing in the town. The population density was 536.4 inhabitants per square mile (207.1/km^{2}). There were 77 housing units at an average density of 233.3 per square mile (90.1/km^{2}). The racial makeup of the town was 98.3% White, 1.1% Native American, and 0.6% from other races. Hispanic or Latino of any race were 1.1% of the population.

There were 69 households, of which 40.6% had children under the age of 18 living with them, 63.8% were married couples living together, 5.8% had a female householder with no husband present, 4.3% had a male householder with no wife present, and 26.1% were non-families. 21.7% of all households were made up of individuals, and 4.3% had someone living alone who was 65 years of age or older. The average household size was 2.57 and the average family size was 3.02.

The median age in the town was 38.3 years. 28.2% of residents were under the age of 18; 4% were between the ages of 18 and 24; 24.8% were from 25 to 44; 29.9% were from 45 to 64; and 13% were 65 years of age or older. The gender makeup of the town was 53.1% male and 46.9% female.

=== 2000 census ===
As of the 2000 Census, there were 183 people, 71 households, and 57 families residing in the town. The population density was 557.2 inhabitants per square mile (215.1/km^{2}). There were 76 housing units at an average density of 231.4 per square mile (89.3/km^{2}). The racial makeup of the town was 96.17% White, 1.09% Native American, 0.55% Asian, 1.09% from other races, and 1.09% from two or more races. Hispanic or Latino of any race were 1.09% of the population.

There were 71 households, out of which 33.8% had children under the age of 18 living with them, 64.8% were married couples living together, 5.6% had a female householder with no husband present, and 19.7% were non-families. 16.9% of all households were made up of individuals, and 2.8% had someone living alone who was 65 years of age or older. The average household size was 2.58 and the average family size was 2.84.

In the town, the population was spread out, with 26.8% under the age of 18, 7.7% from 18 to 24, 29.5% from 25 to 44, 21.9% from 45 to 64, and 14.2% who were 65 years of age or older. The median age was 38 years. For every 100 females, there were 117.9 males. For every 100 females age 18 and over, there were 119.7 males.

As of 2000 the median income for a household in the town was $35,625, and the median income for a family was $35,625. Males had a median income of $25,313 versus $18,750 for females. The per capita income for the town was $14,405. About 7.5% of families and 12.3% of the population were below the poverty line, including 27.1% of those under the age of eighteen and none of those 65 or over.

== Education ==
It is in the Yankton School District 63-3.
