= Volin, South Dakota =

- Town
- Location in Yankton County and the state of South Dakota
- Coordinates: 42°57′31″N 97°10′52″W
- Country: United States
- State: South Dakota
- County: Yankton
- Incorporated: 1901

Area
  - Total: 0.20 sq mi (0.51 km^{2})
  - Land: 0.20 sq mi (0.51 km^{2})
  - Water: 0 sq mi (0.00 km^{2})
- Elevation: 1,201 ft (366 m)

Population (2020)
  - Total: 158
  - Density: 802.1/sq mi (309.69/km^{2})
- Time zone: UTC-6 (Central (CST))
  - Summer (DST): UTC-5 (CDT)
- ZIP code: 57072
- Area code: 605
- FIPS code: 46-67780
- GNIS feature ID: 1267619

Volin (pronounced VAH'-lin) is a town in Yankton County, South Dakota, United States. The population was 158 at the 2020 census.

== Geography ==
According to the United States Census Bureau, the town has a total area of 0.20 square miles (0.52 km^{2}), all land.

== History ==
A post office called Volin has been in operation since 1887. The town was named for Henry P. Volin, a local landowner.

== Demographics ==
Historical population
Census	Pop.	Note	%±
1910	286		—
1920	314		9.8%
1930	283		−9.9%
1940	292		3.2%
1950	197		−32.5%
1960	171		−13.2%
1970	157		−8.2%
1980	156		−0.6%
1990	175		12.2%
2000	207		18.3%
2010	161		−22.2%
2020	158		−1.9%
U.S. Decennial Census

=== 2010 census ===
As of the census of 2010, there were 161 people, 61 households, and 41 families residing in the town. The population density was 805.0 inhabitants per square mile (310.8/km^{2}). There were 76 housing units at an average density of 380.0 per square mile (146.7/km^{2}). The racial makeup of the town was 99.4% White and 0.6% from two or more races.

There were 61 households, of which 39.3% had children under the age of 18 living with them, 50.8% were married couples living together, 11.5% had a female householder with no husband present, 4.9% had a male householder with no wife present, and 32.8% were non-families. 21.3% of all households were made up of individuals, and 8.2% had someone living alone who was 65 years of age or older. The average household size was 2.64 and the average family size was 3.10.

The median age in the town was 33.8 years. 29.8% of residents were under the age of 18; 8.1% were between the ages of 18 and 24; 26.8% were from 25 to 44; 26.1% were from 45 to 64; and 9.3% were 65 years of age or older. The gender makeup of the town was 52.8% male and 47.2% female.

=== 2000 census ===
As of the census of 2000, there were 207 people, 74 households, and 54 families residing in the town. The population density was 1,068.5 inhabitants per square mile (412.6/km^{2}). There were 81 housing units at an average density of 418.1 per square mile (161.4/km^{2}). The racial makeup of the town was 94.20% White, 3.86% Native American, and 1.93% from two or more races.

There were 74 households, out of which 45.9% had children under the age of 18 living with them, 52.7% were married couples living together, 10.8% had a female householder with no husband present, and 27.0% were non-families. 24.3% of all households were made up of individuals, and 10.8% had someone living alone who was 65 years of age or older. The average household size was 2.80 and the average family size was 3.35.

In the town, the population was spread out, with 33.8% under the age of 18, 13.5% from 18 to 24, 23.7% from 25 to 44, 20.3% from 45 to 64, and 8.7% who were 65 years of age or older. The median age was 27 years. For every 100 females, there were 101.0 males. For every 100 females age 18 and over, there were 107.6 males.

The median income for a household in the town was $30,938, and the median income for a family was $39,375. Males had a median income of $29,583 versus $17,000 for females. The per capita income for the town was $12,123. About 22.0% of families and 23.5% of the population were below the poverty line, including 21.4% of those under the age of eighteen and 50.0% of those 65 or over.

== Education ==
It is in the Gayville-Volin School District 63-1.
