= National Register of Historic Places listings in Clay County, South Dakota =

Location of Clay County in South Dakota

This is a list of the National Register of Historic Places listings in Clay County, South Dakota.

This is intended to be a complete list of the properties and districts on the National Register of Historic Places in Clay County, South Dakota, United States. The locations of National Register properties and districts for which the latitude and longitude coordinates are included below, may be seen in a map.

There are 44 properties and districts listed on the National Register in the county. Another 2 properties were once listed but have since been removed.

This National Park Service list is complete through NPS recent listings posted September 26, 2025.

== Current listings ==
| | Name on the Register | Image | Date listed | Location | City or town | Description |
|---|---|---|---|---|---|---|
| 1 | Anderson Homestead | | March 30, 1978 (#78002543) | East of Hub City; 42°57′45″N 96°48′23″W | Hub City | |
| 2 | William Andre House | William Andre House | October 31, 2002 (#02001284) | 31256 452nd Ave. 42°51′29″N 97°09′35″W | Gayville | |
| 3 | Austin-Whittemore House | Austin-Whittemore House | October 18, 1972 (#72001225) | 15 Austin Ave. 42°46′44″N 96°56′07″W | Vermillion | Now a local history museum. |
| 4 | Bluff Historic District | Bluff Historic District | June 23, 2016 (#16000415) | Oak Pl. and Court, Kidder, Church, and Bloomingdale Sts. 42°46′38″N 96°55′54″W | Vermillion | |
| 5 | Bluff View Cemetery Chapel | Bluff View Cemetery Chapel | May 31, 2006 (#06000458) | 0.2 miles south of junction of Crawford Rd. and Pinehurst Dr. 42°46′25″N 96°54′20″W | Vermillion | |
| 6 | Brookman House | Brookman House | August 28, 2023 (#100009320) | 404 Cottage Ave. 42°47′02″N 96°55′57″W | Vermillion | |
| 7 | Building at 125 Ohio St. | Building at 125 Ohio St. | February 14, 2002 (#02000021) | 125 Ohio St. 43°00′31″N 97°06′25″W | Wakonda | |
| 8 | Burbank School No. 10 | Burbank School No. 10 | July 5, 1996 (#96000740) | White St., 2 blocks north of the former Chicago, Milwaukee, St. Paul and Pacific railroad tracks. 42°44′53″N 96°49′41″W | Burbank | |
| 9 | Clay County Courthouse | Clay County Courthouse | August 18, 1983 (#83003005) | 211 W. Main St. 42°46′47″N 96°56′08″W | Vermillion | |
| 10 | Colton House | Colton House | November 19, 2007 (#07001210) | 402 S. University St. 42°46′37″N 96°55′26″W | Vermillion | |
| 11 | Downtown Vermillion Historic District | Downtown Vermillion Historic District | March 7, 2003 (#02001288) | Main St., roughly bounded by Market and Dakota Sts. 42°46′45″N 96°55′52″W | Vermillion | |
| 12 | First Baptist Church of Vermillion | First Baptist Church of Vermillion | March 5, 1982 (#82003921) | 101 E. Main St. 42°46′44″N 96°55′49″W | Vermillion | |
| 13 | First Congregational Church, Vermillion | First Congregational Church, Vermillion | July 16, 2021 (#100006723) | 226 East Main St. 42°46′46″N 96°55′40″W | Vermillion | |
| 14 | First Methodist Episcopal Church | First Methodist Episcopal Church | January 28, 2004 (#03001522) | 14-16 North Dakota St. 42°46′46″N 96°55′46″W | Vermillion | |
| 15 | First National Bank Building of Vermillion | First National Bank Building of Vermillion | February 13, 1986 (#86000244) | 1 E. Main St. 42°46′45″N 96°55′54″W | Vermillion | |
| 16 | Forest Avenue Historic District | Forest Avenue Historic District | October 18, 1979 (#79002400) | Forest Ave. and Lewis St. Boundary clarification (listed March 6, 2012, refnum 12000086): 15-322 Forest Ave., 205-221 Lewis St. 42°46′36″N 96°55′43″W | Vermillion | |
| 17 | Garfield Township Hall | Garfield Township Hall | January 28, 2004 (#03001523) | 16667 306th St. 42°57′08″N 96°51′50″W | Beresford | |
| 18 | Gunderson House | Gunderson House | February 9, 2001 (#01000092) | 24 S. Harvard; 42°46′38″N 96°55′39″W | Vermillion | |
| 19 | Inman House | Inman House | May 24, 1976 (#76001723) | 415 E. Main St. 42°46′45″N 96°55′31″W | Vermillion | |
| 20 | Basil H. & Frances Jacobson House | Basil H. & Frances Jacobson House | November 17, 2022 (#100008376) | 1101 James St. 42°47′24″N 96°57′17″W | Vermillion | |
| 21 | Calle Nissen Johnsen Farm | Calle Nissen Johnsen Farm | December 17, 1999 (#99001581) | 31494 453rd Ave. 42°49′26″N 97°08′24″W | Gayville | |
| 22 | Jolley Historic District | Jolley Historic District | November 17, 2022 (#100008377) | Roughly bounded by East Main, South Pine, East Lewis, East Canby, and South Harvard St. 42°46′33″N 96°55′27″W | Vermillion | |
| 23 | Jens N. and Anna Junker Farmstead | Jens N. and Anna Junker Farmstead | December 20, 1988 (#88002841) | Norway Township, Section 6; 42°48′46″N 97°08′57″W | Norway Township | |
| 24 | Lincoln School No. 12 | Lincoln School No. 12 | August 16, 2000 (#00000995) | 45352 Timber Rd. 42°47′39″N 97°07′50″W | Meckling | |
| 25 | Linden House | Linden House | September 14, 2001 (#01001001) | 509 Linden Ave. 42°46′26″N 96°55′24″W | Vermillion | |
| 26 | Daniel A. Messler Homestead | | February 14, 2002 (#02000022) | 30337 Greenfield Rd. 42°59′36″N 96°50′59″W | Beresford | |
| 27 | Old Armory-Vermillion | Old Armory-Vermillion | October 31, 2002 (#02001285) | 414 E. Clark St. 42°47′03″N 96°55′31″W | Vermillion | Now the Belbas Center on the campus of the University of South Dakota. |
| 28 | Old Main | Old Main | March 24, 1973 (#73001738) | Clark St. on the University of South Dakota campus 42°47′02″N 96°55′26″W | Vermillion | |
| 29 | Prentis Park | Prentis Park | November 8, 2001 (#01001218) | Plum and Main Sts. 42°46′53″N 96°55′05″W | Vermillion | |
| 30 | Rice Farm | | January 20, 1978 (#78002544) | West of Vermillion; 42°53′47″N 97°01′11″W | Vermillion | |
| 31 | St. Agnes Catholic Church | St. Agnes Catholic Church | March 27, 1995 (#95000280) | 202 Washington St. 42°46′54″N 96°56′04″W | Vermillion | Now an arts center. |
| 32 | Sample-Lindblaum House | Sample-Lindblaum House | December 2, 1998 (#98001405) | 410 Idaho St. 43°00′15″N 97°06′29″W | Wakonda | |
| 33 | South Dakota Department of Trans. Br. No. 14-130-176 | South Dakota Department of Trans. Br. No. 14-130-176 | November 8, 2001 (#01001220) | Local road over the Vermillion River; 42°49′47″N 96°54′16″W | Vermillion | |
| 34 | South Dakota Department of Trans. Br. No. 14-133-170 | South Dakota Department of Trans. Br. No. 14-133-170 | November 8, 2001 (#01001222) | Local road over the Vermillion River; 42°50′14″N 96°53′44″W | Vermillion | |
| 35 | South Dakota Department of Transportation Bridge No. 14-060-032 | South Dakota Department of Transportation Bridge No. 14-060-032 | January 28, 2000 (#00000020) | Local road over Spring Creek; 43°02′19″N 97°02′32″W | Wakonda | Apparently no longer extant |
| 36 | South Dakota Department of Transportation Bridge No. 14-088-170 | South Dakota Department of Transportation Bridge No. 14-088-170 | January 14, 2000 (#99001689) | Local road over Clay Creek Ditch; 42°50′14″N 96°59′19″W | Vermillion | |
| 37 | South Dakota Department of Transportation Bridge No. 14-090-042 | | January 14, 2000 (#99001700) | Local road over the Vermillion River; 43°01′23″N 96°58′58″W | Wakonda | |
| 38 | Spirit Mound | Spirit Mound | November 19, 1974 (#74001889) | North of Vermillion; 42°52′32″N 96°57′32″W | Vermillion | |
| 39 | University Historic District | University Historic District | February 24, 1975 (#75001714) | Bounded by N. Yale, E. Clark, Willow, and E. Main Sts. 42°46′52″N 96°55′27″W | Vermillion | Named "Vermillion Historic District" until September 1, 2015 |
| 40 | University of South Dakota Historic Core District | University of South Dakota Historic Core District | February 28, 2025 (#100011471) | 414 E. Clark Street; 42°47′02″N 96°55′29″W | Vermillion | |
| 41 | Vermillion-Andrew Carnegie Library | Vermillion-Andrew Carnegie Library | August 18, 1983 (#83003006) | 12 Church St. 42°46′43″N 96°55′49″W | Vermillion | |
| 42 | Wakonda State Bank | Wakonda State Bank | August 15, 2003 (#03000765) | 118 Ohio St. 43°00′31″N 97°06′26″W | Wakonda | |
| 43 | E.H. Willey House | E.H. Willey House | June 17, 1982 (#82003922) | 104 Court St. 42°46′41″N 96°55′54″W | Vermillion | |
| 44 | Yusten House | | January 23, 2007 (#06001310) | 30831 Highway 19; 42°55′20″N 96°57′17″W | Vermillion | |

== Former listings ==
| | Name on the Register | Image | Date listed | Date removed | Location | City or town | Description |
|---|---|---|---|---|---|---|---|
| 1 | South Dakota Department of Transportation Bridge No. 14-105-209 | | January 14, 2000 (#99001690) | March 26, 2008 | Local Road over Chicago, Milwaukee, St. Paul and Pacific Railroad tracks | Vermillion | |
| 2 | South Dakota Department of Transportation Bridge No. 14-120-222 | | September 29, 1999 (#99001218) | March 26, 2008 | Local road over Ash Creek | Vermillion | |

== See also ==
- List of National Historic Landmarks in South Dakota
- National Register of Historic Places listings in South Dakota
