= Garfield Historic District =

Garfield Historic District may refer to:

- Garfield Historic District (Phoenix), Arizona, National Register of Historic Places listings in Phoenix, Arizona
- Garfield Street Historic District, Cambridge, Massachusetts
- Garfield Historic District (Poplar Bluff, Missouri), National Register of Historic Places listings in Butler County, Missouri
- Garfield Place Historic District, Poughkeepsie, New York

== See also ==
- Garfield House (disambiguation)
- Garfield Building (disambiguation)
- Garfield Park (disambiguation)
- Garfield Library (disambiguation)
- Garfield School (disambiguation)
