= Garfield House =

Garfield House may refer to:

- Garfield House (South Pasadena, California), listed on the NRHP in Los Angeles County, California
- Garfield Farm and Inn Museum, St. Charles, Illinois, NRHP-listed as "Garfield Farm and Tavern"
- Sims-Garfield Ranch, Ryegate, Montana, listed on the NRHP in Golden Valley County, Montana
- Halsey Garfield House, Sheffield, Ohio, listed on the NRHP in Lorain County, Ohio
- James A. Garfield House, Hiram, Ohio, listed on the NRHP in Portage County, Ohio
- Milton Garfield House, Sheffield, Ohio, listed on the NRHP in Lorain County, Ohio
- Garfield-Broad Apartments, Columbus, Ohio, listed on the NRHP in Columbus, Ohio
- James A. Garfield National Historic Site, Mentor, Ohio, NRHP-listed
- A sketch in the first season of I Think You Should Leave with Tim Robinson

== See also ==
- Garfield Building (disambiguation)
- Garfield Park (disambiguation)
- Garfield Historic District (disambiguation)
- Garfield Library (disambiguation)
- Garfield School (disambiguation)
