= Garfield School =

Garfield School or Old Garfield School or variations may refer to:

- Garfield Elementary School (disambiguation), various places
- Garfield Intermediate School, Berkeley, California, listed on the National Register of Historic Places (NRHP) in Alameda County
- Garfield School (Boise, Idaho), listed on the NRHP in Ada County
- Garfield School (Lewiston, Idaho), listed on the NRHP in Nez Perce County
- James A. Garfield School, Detroit, Michigan, listed on the NRHP in Wayne County
- Garfield School (Sault Ste. Marie, Michigan), listed on the NRHP in Chippewa County
- Garfield School (Billings, Montana), listed on the NRHP in Yellowstone County
- Garfield School (Brunswick, New York), listed on the NRHP in Rensselaer County
- Old Garfield School (Salem, Oregon), listed on the NRHP in Marion County

== See also ==
- Garfield Building (disambiguation)
- Garfield House (disambiguation)
