= Clay County Courthouse =

Clay County Courthouse or Old Clay County Courthouse may refer to:

- Clay County Courthouse (Alabama), Ashland, Alabama, listed on the National Register of Historic Places (NRHP)
- Clay County Courthouse, Eastern District, Piggott, Arkansas, NRHP-listed
- Clay County Courthouse (Florida), Green Cove Springs, Florida, NRHP-listed
- Clay County Courthouse (Georgia), Fort Gaines, Georgia, NRHP-listed
- Clay County Courthouse (Indiana), Brazil, Indiana, NRHP-listed
- Clay County Courthouse (Illinois), Louisville, Illinois, NRHP-listed
- Clay County Courthouse (Iowa), Spencer, Iowa, NRHP-listed
- Clay County Courthouse (Kansas), Clay Center, Kansas, NRHP-listed
- Clay County Courthouse (Mississippi), West Point, Mississippi
- Clay County Courthouse (Nebraska), Clay Center, Nebraska, NRHP-listed
- Clay County Courthouse (North Carolina), Haynesville, North Carolina, NRHP-listed
- Clay County Courthouse (South Dakota), Vermillion, South Dakota, NRHP-listed
- Clay County Courthouse (Tennessee), Celina, Tennessee, NRHP-listed
- Clay County Courthouse and Jail, Henrietta, Texas, NRHP-listed
- Old Clay County Courthouse (West Virginia), Clay, West Virginia, NRHP-listed
