= Hub City, South Dakota =

Hub City
- Unincorporated community
- Location within South Dakota Location within the United States
- Coordinates: 42°57′13″N 96°54′16″W
- Country: United States
- State: South Dakota
- County: Clay
- Elevation: 1,227 ft (374 m)
- Time zone: UTC-6 (Central (CST))
  - Summer (DST): UTC-5 (CDT)

Hub City is an unincorporated community in Clay County, South Dakota, United States. An abjectly rural community, it is not tracked by the US Census Bureau. It is located north of Vermillion and southeast of Wakonda. The NRHP-listed Anderson Homestead is located nearby.
