= Westerville =

Westerville may refer to one of the following places in the United States:

- Westerville, Ohio, the largest Westerville
- Westerville, Nebraska, an unincorporated community
- Westerville Township, Custer County, Nebraska

== See also ==
- Westernville, New York
- Westreville, South Dakota
- Westville (disambiguation)
