= Kevin Rivers =

Kevin Rivers may refer to:

- Kevin Rivers (songwriter) (born 1987), American songwriter and entrepreneur
- Kevin Rivers (beach volleyball), beach volleyball and volleyball player from Trinidad and Tobago
