= Wakonda Variety =

- Building at 125 Ohio St.
- U.S. National Register of Historic Places
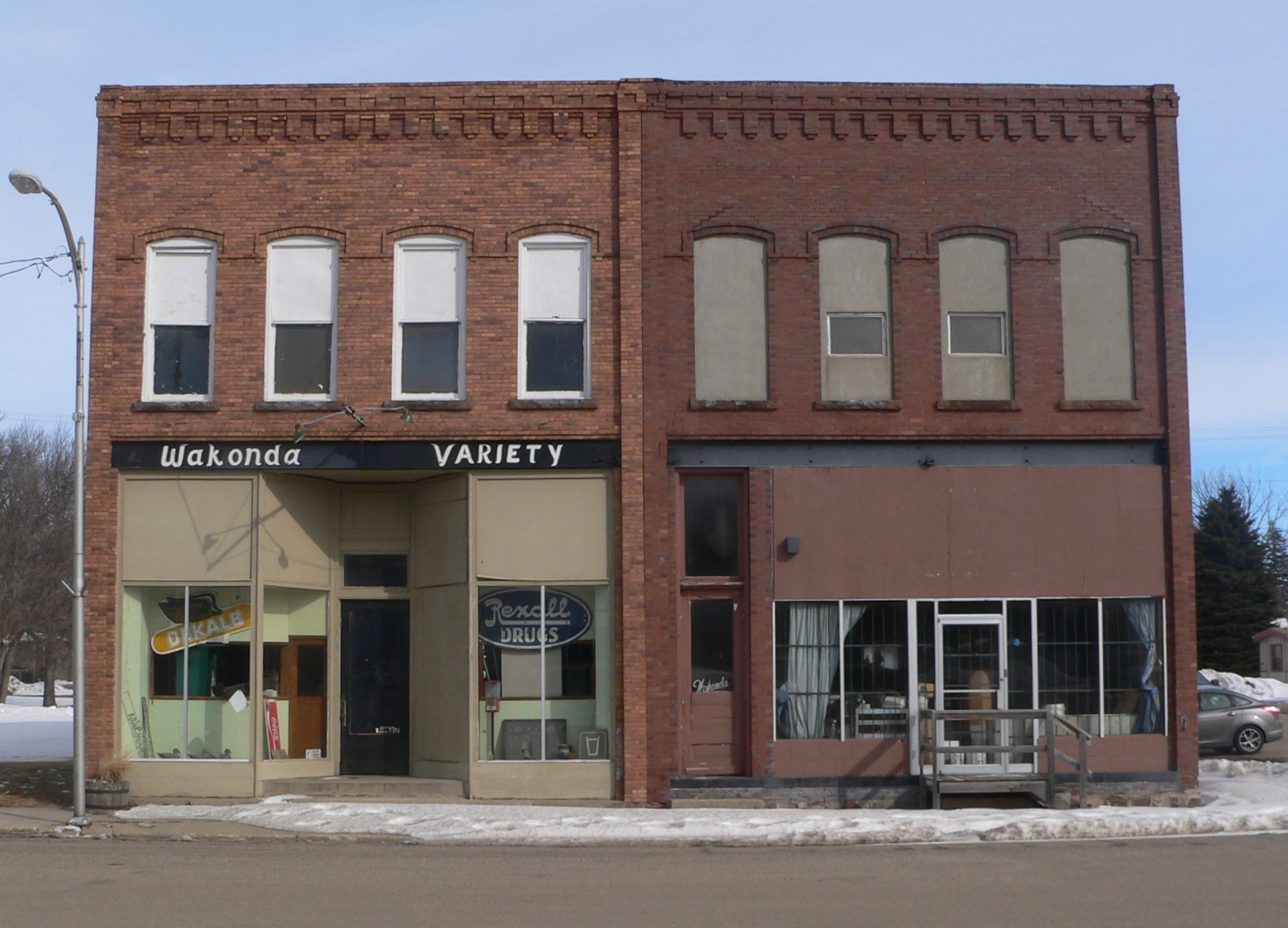
- Wakonda Variety, left façade, in 2016

- Location within South Dakota Location within the United States
- Location: 125 Ohio St., Wakonda, South Dakota
- Coordinates: 43°00′28″N 97°06′21″W
- Area: less than one acre
- Built: c. 1907; 119 years ago
- Built by: Wallace Wright
- Architectural style: Early Commercial
- NRHP reference No.: 02000021
- Added to NRHP: February 14, 2002

Wakonda Variety is a historic commercial building at 125 Ohio Street on Wakonda, South Dakota. It was listed on the National Register of Historic Places in 2002 as Building at 125 Ohio St. Its nomination form cited the Wakonda Variety building as a "well-preserved example of the Commercial style in a rural town setting where very few historic buildings are left."

== History ==
The community of Wakonda began growing after a railroad was built through the area. A 1906 fire destroyed multiple wooden buildings in the commercial area. The Wakonda Variety building lot was first purchased by Wallace Wright in January 1907 from a local real estate company, and the building is believed to have been built later that year. Because it was constructed out of brick, the building survived a 1917 fire that destroyed most of the surrounding commercial structures (the nearby Wakonda State Bank also survived this event). Since its construction, the building has variably been a meat market, a drug store, a variety store, a newspaper office, and a casket storage space. By the late 1930s and through the 1940s, it was a pharmacy run by Neil Chancellor and later by Glen and Mae Sample. In 1968, it was sold to Wilfred and Ann Doty, who turned it into the Wakonda Variety store, by which name it is now best known. This store closed in 1980, at which point the Steffen family briefly took over the variety store business. After the final variety store closed, the building became vacant and has since been used as a private storage space. On February 14, 2002, it was added to the National Register of Historic Places.

== Architecture ==
The Wakonda Variety building is a rare example of surviving early 20th architecture in Wakonda. Built in the Early Commercial style, it is constructed mostly out of brick and sits atop a concrete foundation. It contains a recessed central entryway with two large plate glass display windows on either side. An exposed metal beam divides the first and second floors and still bears the text "Wakonda Variety". At each corner is a brick pilaster, which rises to and joins the corbelled parapet adorning the flat asphalt roof. The second floor contains double-hung arched windows with stone sills and decorative brickwork hoods. The building sharing its southeast wall, 127 Ohio Street, has a nearly identical façade but is not NRHP-listed due to having undergone heavy alterations.
