= Meckling, South Dakota =

- Unincorporated community
- Location within South Dakota Location within the United States
- Coordinates: 42°50′24″N 97°04′02″W
- Country: United States
- State: South Dakota
- County: Clay
- Founded: 1873

Area
  - Total: 0.20 sq mi (0.53 km^{2})
  - Land: 0.20 sq mi (0.53 km^{2})
  - Water: 0 sq mi (0.00 km^{2})
- Elevation: 1,155 ft (352 m)

Population (2020)
  - Total: 48
  - Density: 235.5/sq mi (90.94/km^{2})
- Time zone: UTC-6 (Central (CST))
  - Summer (DST): UTC-5 (CDT)
- ZIP code: 57069 (Formerly 57044)
- Area code: 605
- FIPS code: 46-41740
- GNIS feature ID: 2813012

Meckling is an unincorporated community and a census-designated place (CDP) in Clay County, South Dakota, United States. The population was 48 at the 2020 census.

== History ==
Meckling was laid out in 1873, and named in honor of Jones S. Meckling, a railroad employee.

Due to the large number of farms that grow the crop alfalfa it has become known as the "Hay Capital of the Universe". In this fertile Missouri River valley of southeastern South Dakota, alfalfa hay is the crop of choice. Each August Meckling and its neighboring town Gayville, the Hay Capital of the World host the Annual Hay Days.

In 1965, the local school closed, and the residents were allowed to choose between the Gayville or Vermillion school districts. A couple of families, displeased with those choices, campaigned for an additional selection to be added: Wakonda. The principal at the time, Henry Mollman, argued that the Wakonda School District did not have the appropriate resources to accommodate the extra students, and thus the choice was not given.

Recently Meckling's zip code has been changed to Vermillion, SD's zip code of 57069.

== Demographics ==
Historical population
Census	Pop.	Note	%±
2020	48		—
U.S. Decennial Census

== Education ==
The school district is Vermillion School District 13-1.

== Notable people ==
- Donna Schafer, member of the South Dakota House of Representatives from 2001 to 2006
