= Garfield Building =

Garfield Building may refer to:

- Garfield Building (Los Angeles, California)
- Edwin S. George Building, Detroit, Michigan
- Garfield Building (New York City)
- Garfield Building (Cleveland)

== See also ==
- Garfield Township Hall, Beresford, South Dakota
- Garfield Memorial, Cleveland, Ohio
- Garfield Methodist Church, Phoenix, Arizona
- Garfield Library (disambiguation)
- Garfield House (disambiguation)
