= William Andre House =

Historic house in South Dakota, United States

- U.S. National Register of Historic Places
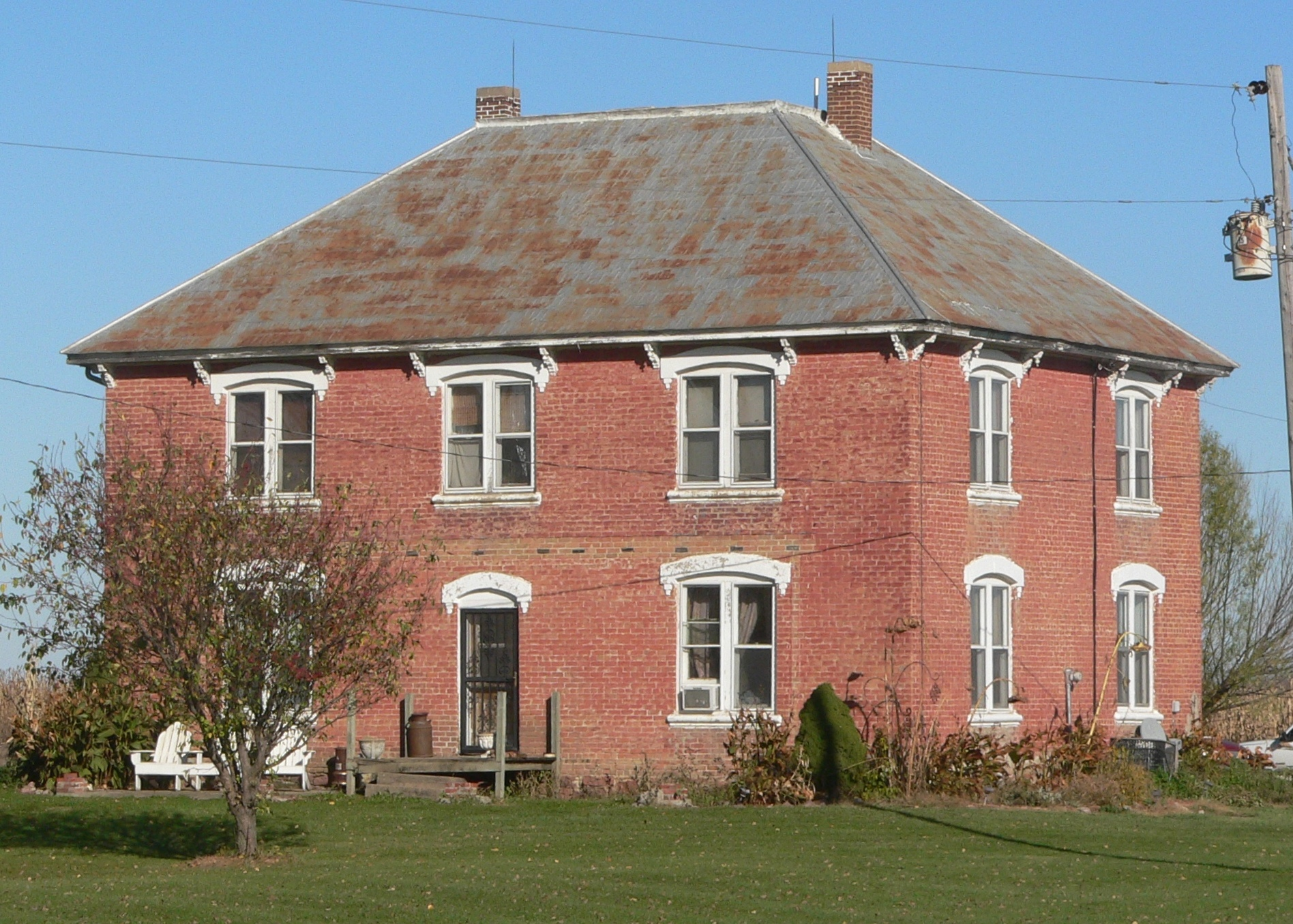

- Location within South Dakota Location within the United States
- Nearest city: Gayville, South Dakota
- Coordinates: 42°51′29″N 97°09′35″W
- Area: less than one acre
- Built: 1896
- Built by: William Andre
- Architectural style: Italianate
- NRHP reference No.: 02001284
- Added to NRHP: October 31, 2002

The William Andre House, sometimes simply the Andre House, is a historic house located at 31256 452nd Avenue in rural Clay County, South Dakota, near Gayville. It was listed on the National Register of Historic Places in 2002.

== History ==
William Frederick Andre was a German immigrant who came to the United States in 1867. He moved from Nebraska to the Gayville area in 1874. After his first wife died in 1885, he returned to Germany the following year and reconnected with an old sweetheart, Georgina, who was also recently widowed. He brought her and her children back to Gayville, where they married, and in 1896 William constructed this large brick house for his family. William died in 1906 and Georgina in 1939, and both are buried in Vangen Church Cemetery in Mission Hill.

== Architecture ==
It is a two-story brick Italianate style house on a brick foundation. Specifically, it is classified into a subtype of Italianate architecture that features a simple hipped roof and box-shaped construction. It contained fourteen rooms and an additional five basement rooms: eight bedrooms, a library, a kitchen, a dining room, a sitting room, and a large parlor with plush carpets and blue satin furniture. This parlor was used to entertain guests and host events, including dances. A grand central oak staircase provides access to the second floor. The two-story gable portion at the rear was used as a servants' living space. Two large brick chimneys are located on either side. A large porch on the first floor was removed sometime prior to 1980. It was deemed notable as "an excellent example of the Italianate style of architecture in South Dakota"; the house has defining elements of Italianate including a "low pitched roof, decorative brackets beneath the eaves, tall narrow windows and elaborate window crowns."
