= Garfield Library =

Garfield Library may refer to:

- Garfield Park Branch Library, Santa Cruz, California, listed on the NRHP in Santa Cruz County, California
- Garfield Library (Mentor, Ohio), listed on the NRHP in Lake County, Ohio

== See also ==
- Garfield Building (disambiguation)
- Garfield School (disambiguation)
- Garfield House (disambiguation)
