= Garfield Elementary School =

Garfield Elementary School may refer to:

in the United States

(by state then city)

- Garfield Elementary School (Garfield, Arkansas), listed on the NRHP in Benton County, Arkansas
- Garfield Elementary School (San Francisco, California)
- Garfield Elementary School (Santa Ana, California)
- Garfield Elementary School (Boise, Idaho)
- Garfield Elementary School (Elgin, Illinois) in Elgin Area School District U46
- Garfield Elementary School (Moline, Illinois), listed on the NRHP in Rock Island County, Illinois
- Garfield Elementary School (Abilene, Kansas), listed on the NRHP in Dickinson County, Kansas
- Garfield Elementary School (Livonia, Michigan), where Kevin Rogers began
- Garfield Elementary School (Medina, Ohio)
