= Westreville, South Dakota =

Unincorporated community in South Dakota, US

See also Westerville for similarly named places.

Westreville is an unincorporated community in Clay County, South Dakota, United States.

The community is located at 42°55′27″N 97°01′24″W with an elevation of 1309 feet.
