= Watunes =

American social music service

WaTunes
- Type: Private
- Industry: Music
- Genre: Publishing
- Founded: 2006
- Headquarters: Detroit, United States
- Area served: Worldwide
- Products: Digital delivery (music)
- Services: MP3 Downloads; MP3 Streaming
- Number of employees: 10+
- Parent: Venzo Digital
- Website: watunes.com

WaTunes was a social music service founded in 2006 by American songwriter and entrepreneur Kevin Rivers. Based in Detroit, Michigan, WaTunes used to provide artist users an opportunity to get their music place into leading digital retailers such as iTunes, Napster, Amazon, Rhapsody, and eMusic. WaTunes was the world's first Facebook Music Store app that enables users to discover millions of songs, stream & download MP3s, share music on any social network and more on Facebook. WaTunes closed down in April 2010.

== Artists ==
Though providing a social media service for thousands of independent artists, WaTunes has been used by many notable artists & celebrities.

- Jesse Saunders
- Dr. Chud
- Chubb Rock
- Earl Monroe
- Sam Glaser
- Spyder-D
- Mick Taylor

== Company Highlights ==
- On March 3, 2009, WaTunes made a historical announcement to offer its online music distribution service entirely free to musicians and other rights holders while they earn 100% of their royalties. This position has drawn immediate media attention from places such as Vator, CNET, and TechCrunch.
- On April 11, 2009, WaTunes partnered with Jango to provide musicians the opportunity to get airplay in front of Jango's 6 million users.
- On May 11, 2009, WaTunes partnered with SoundOps to offer musicians a multi-mastering service. WaTunes is the first online music distribution service to offer independent artists and record labels the ability to track their sales on iTunes on a day-to-day basis.
- On February 22, 2010, WaTunes partners with MediaNet to launch the WaTunes Marketplace, a social music store that enables its users to discover and buy millions of songs. The WaTunes Marketplace currently license songs from thousands of independent labels and major labels Universal Music Group & EMI Music.
- On April 6, 2010, WaTunes launches Music Store, the first Facebook Application that enables its users to discover and buy millions of songs on Facebook using a full fledge storefront.
- On April 11, 2010, Warner Music Group signs its full catalog with WaTunes through MediaNet for WaTunes' Facebook application.
- On January 19, 2011, WaTunes closes its social website and moves all operations to Facebook. As a result, becoming one of the most convenient ways to download and share music on Facebook. WaTunes also secures license from Sony Music Entertainment, the last of the four major labels to sign its full catalog with WaTunes.
