= Old Garfield School (Salem, Oregon) =

Office building and former schoolhouse

- U.S. National Register of Historic Places
- U.S. Historic district – Contributing property
- Garfield Elementary School
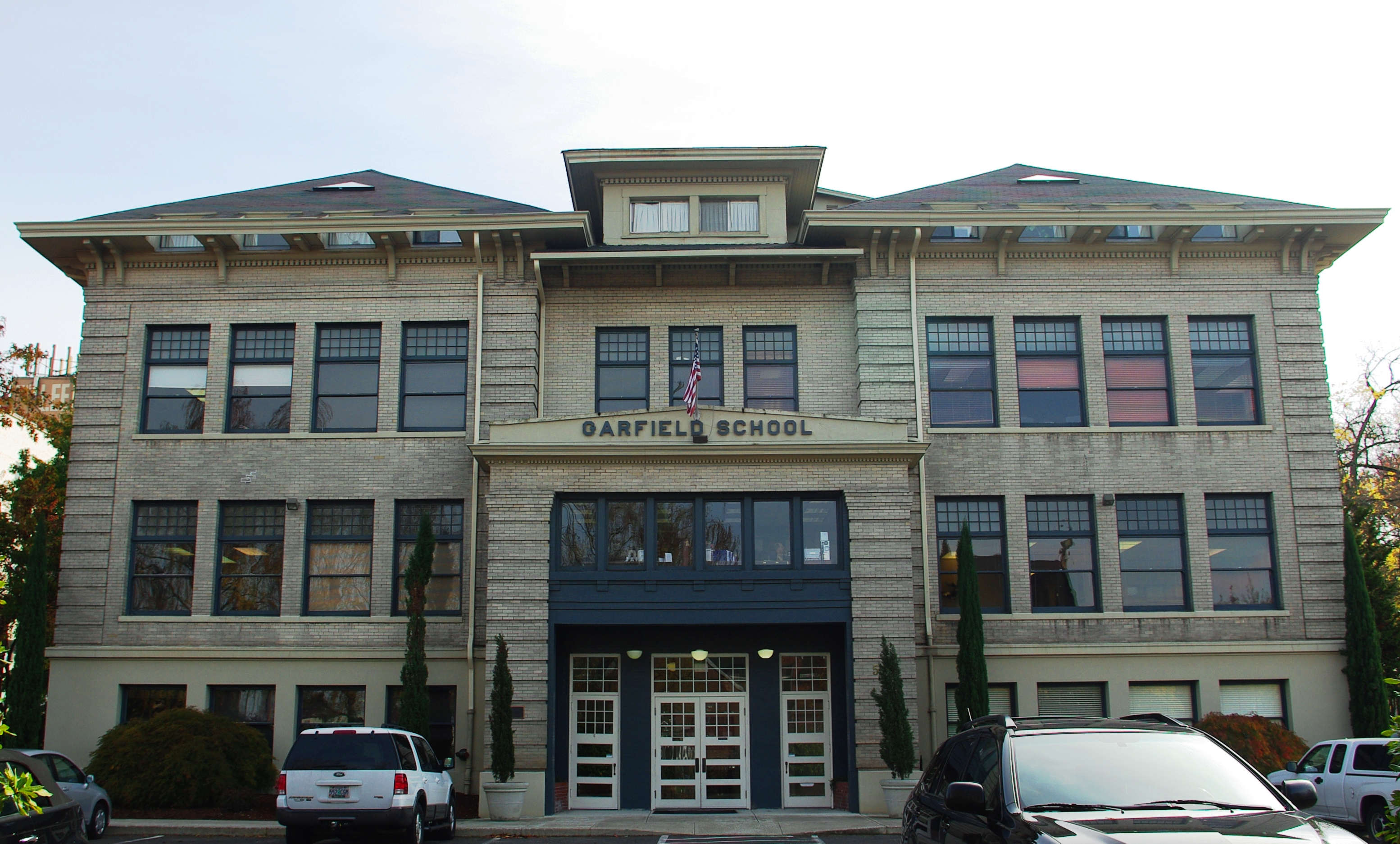
- Old Garfield School
- Location: 528 Cottage Street NE; Salem, Oregon
- Coordinates: 44.94345°N 123.03096°W
- Built: 1909; 117 years ago
- Architect: Fred A. Legg
- Architectural style: American Renaissance
- NRHP reference No.: 81000510
- Added to NRHP: December 2, 1981

The Old Garfield School is a former schoolhouse in Salem, Oregon. From 1909 to 1973, it was an elementary school called the Garfield Elementary School, and was part of the Salem-Keizer School District. The school closed In 1973 and the City of Salem sold the property to a private company, which then renovated the building. It reopened as office space for lease in 1974 and remains in use as of March 2026.

The Old Garfield School has been listed on the National Register of Historic Places since 1981.

== Location and structure ==
The Old Garfield School is located near downtown Salem, Oregon, on the corner of Marion and Cottage streets. It was built in the American Renaissance style and is made of brick, with three floors and an attic. Renovations have preserved the exterior appearance of the building.

The original floor plan had two floors, and each floor had four major classrooms, with one in each corner and small rooms between them. The renovations of the 1970s changed the interior layout, including additions such as an elevator and two murals which reflect the building's history.

== History ==
=== Construction (1908–1909) ===
In March 1909, the public voted to pass a bond measure to build the Garfield school on a property the School Board had bought in 1908. Two days before the vote, a fire broke out at a wooden schoolhouse in East Salem, threatening the lives of 550 students.

The Garfield School was the first public elementary school in Salem to be constructed out of brick. At the time, there were six schoolhouses in Salem, and all of them were made of wood. Several schoolhouses experienced fires which endangered the students and staff, so brick and concrete were chosen as the materials for the new school in the hopes that their relatively fire-resistant properties would mitigate fire risk.

Local architect Frank A. Legg designed the building, (Note: Legg received five percent of the construction costs. This was the first school Legg designed in the region; after this he designed additional schools in the Salem school district and in other areas in the Pacific Northwest, including another schoolhouse in Camas, Washington.) and construction was completed in October 1909.

=== Garfield Elementary School operation (1909–1973) ===
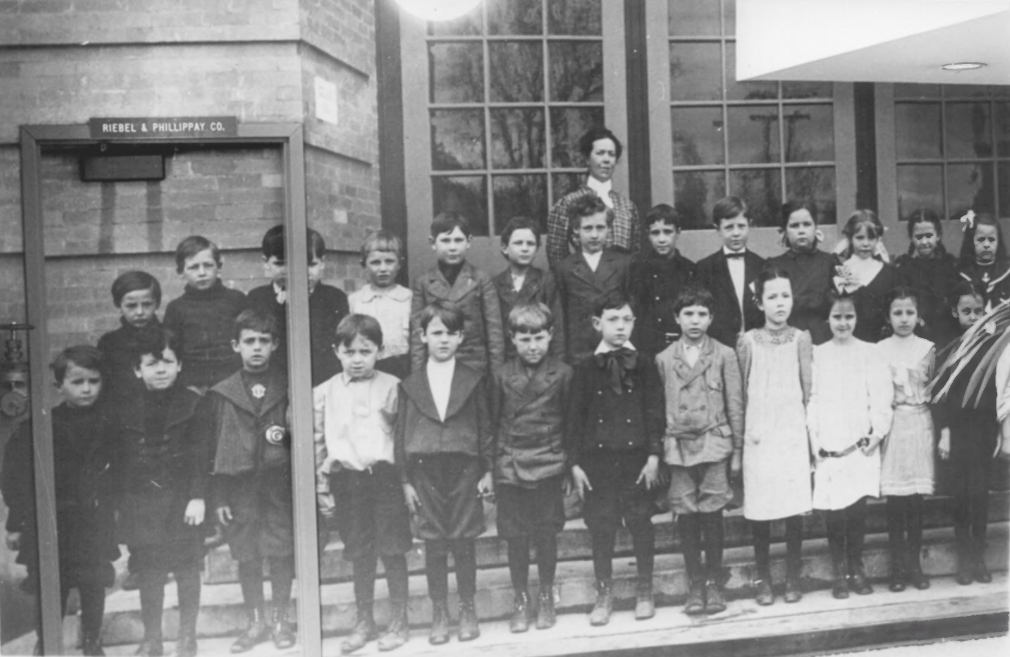
Margaret Cosper and her pupils appear in this mural, which is located in the lobby of the Garfield School.

The first principal of the Garfield Elementary School was Margaret J. Cosper. She placed a strong emphasis on discipline and was known for playing martial music on her Victrola Gramophone while students marched out of classes at noon and the end of the day. She also placed high value on European art in education; photographs of well-known artworks were placed in the hallways, and three Italian statues were displayed in prominent places around the school.

The school closed in 1973.

=== Closure and renovation (1973–present) ===
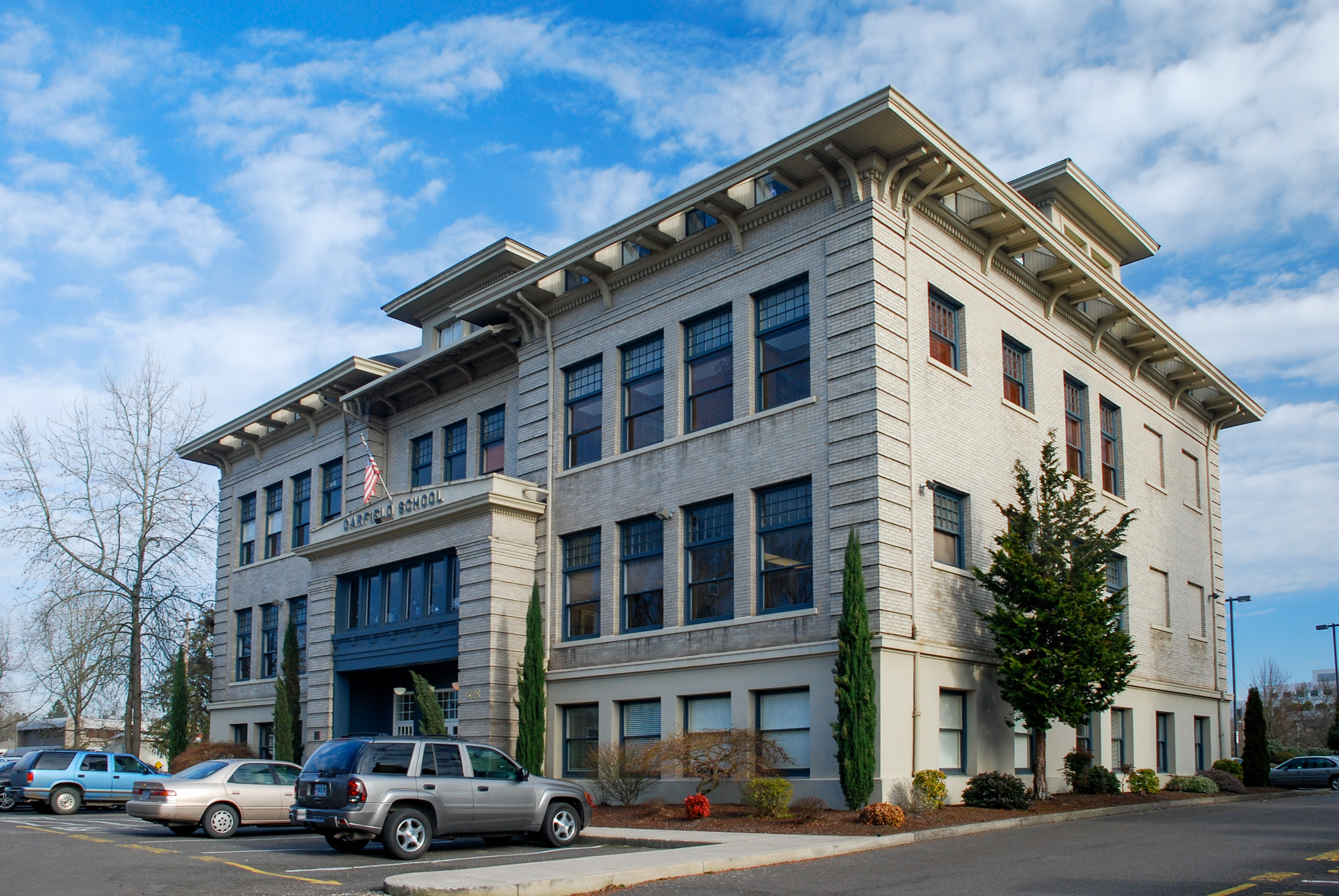
The building in 2009

In 1974, a year after the school was closed, the Garfield building was bought and renovated. Adaptive-use renovation in 1974 turned the rooms and attic into office spaces. A second round of renovation took place in 1979; this renovation had minimal effect on the inside of the building and was just focused on making the space leasable. An elevator was added to ensure the building met modern building code, and the playground was removed and replaced with a parking lot. Alan and Marianne Riebel were involved in renovating the building.

The office space has been used by the Oregon Employment Relations Board, mental health and counseling service providers, and legal firms.

The Old Garfield School was added to the National Register of Historic Places in December 1981.
