= Clay County =

Clay County is the name of 18 counties in the United States. Most are named for Henry Clay, U.S. Senator and statesman:

- Clay County, Alabama
- Clay County, Arkansas (named for John Clayton, and originally named Clayton County)
- Clay County, Florida
- Clay County, Georgia
- Clay County, Illinois
- Clay County, Indiana
- Clay County, Iowa (named for Henry Clay Jr., son of Henry Clay and a soldier in the Mexican–American War)
- Clay County, Kansas
- Clay County, Kentucky (named for Green Clay, cousin of Henry Clay, a member of the Kentucky state legislature)
- Clay County, Minnesota
- Clay County, Mississippi
- Clay County, Missouri
- Clay County, Nebraska
- Clay County, North Carolina
- Clay County, South Dakota
- Clay County, Tennessee
- Clay County, Texas
- Clay County, West Virginia
