= Donna Schafer =

American politician (born 1934)

Member of the South Dakota House of Representatives from the 17th district
- In office 2003–2006

Personal details
- Born: April 12, 1934 (age 92) Meckling, South Dakota
- Party: Republican
- Spouse: Henry
- Children: five
- Profession: teacher

Donna J. Schafer (born April 12, 1934) is an American former politician. She served in the South Dakota House of Representatives from 2001 to 2006.
