= Irene-Wakonda School District 13-3 =

School district in South Dakota, United States

Irene-Wakonda School District 13-3 is a school district headquartered in Irene, South Dakota.

In Clay County the district includes that county's portion of Irene as well as Wakonda. In Turner and Yankton counties, the district includes the remainder of Irene.

== History ==
In 2004 the Irene and Wakonda school district boards of trustees were facilitating discussions on possibly merging, and by then the school districts' athletic teams were set to combine. In 2006, the Irene school district had 190 students and the Wakonda school district had 140 students. Larry Johnke was the superintendent of both school districts. The two district's elementary schools and secondary schools each shared the same person with the other of the same educational stages as the principal.

A referendum on merging the districts was scheduled for June 27, 2006. The merger proposal stated that Wakonda and Irene would host the elementary and secondary schools, respectively, with the district beginning operations on July 1, 2007. The merger would proceed if above 50% of each of the districts both approved merging. Johnke stated that both districts, if they did not combine, would face lower enrollment and problems with money-related issues.

The merger was approved. 35.5% of registered voters in the Wakonda district and 30% of the registered voters in the Irene district participated in the referendum.

The combined district started operations in 2007.

In 2011 the school district began holding school on four days per week, Monday through Thursday, instead of five. That year, the enrollment was 300. This was also true in 2013. That year, Larry Johnke, the superintendent, was scheduled to retire.
