= Anderson Homestead =

- U.S. National Register of Historic Places
- Location within South Dakota Location within the United States
- Nearest city: Hub City, South Dakota
- Coordinates: 42°57′45″N 96°48′23″W
- Area: 9 acres (3.6 ha)
- Built: 1871 or 1876, 1901
- Architectural style: Classical Revival
- NRHP reference No.: 78002543
- Added to NRHP: March 30, 1978

The Anderson Homestead, located in Clay County, South Dakota east of Hub City, South Dakota on the county line road between Clay County and Union County, South Dakota, dates from 1876. It was listed on the National Register of Historic Places in 1978. The listing included 13 contributing buildings, three contributing structures, and a contributing site.

It includes a large Classical Revival-style farmhouse built in 1901, 21 outbuildings, and an original small hall and parlor plan farmhouse which was built in 1871 or 1876 by Olaf Erickson, who immigrated from Uppsala, Sweden and founded the community of Alsen, South Dakota.
