= Garfield Building (New York City) =

Coordinates: 40.69329°N 73.99079°W

The Garfield Building was located at 26 Court Street, at Remsen Street, in Brooklyn, New York. It was built by contractor William Lamb, who was originally from Glasgow, Scotland. Together with his brother Thomas, the builders began their careers with the firm W&T Lamb, starting in 1861. The seven-story Garfield Building was offered in an auction by the Brooklyn Real Estate Exchange in January 1906. The lot covered 100 feet by 150 feet on Remsen Street. It was near Borough Hall, the court house, Temple Bar, Hall of Records, the borough's first subway station, and the heart of the financial center.

== Description and history ==
The building was constructed by tea merchant Abiel Abbot Low, the father of future New York City mayor Seth Low, in 1881. The structure, designed by J. C. Cady of the then-separate city of New York, replaced four brick buildings on Court Street and three on Remsen Street. The Garfield Building was eight stories high and measured 121.5 ft (37.0 m) high, with a clock tower at the corner of Court and Remsen Streets. It was designed in the Italian Renaissance style, with a facade of brownstone on its first two stories and Philadelphia brick and terracotta on its upper stories, as well as a red-tiled roof. Inside were 279 offices (illuminated by a light court), two elevators, and a law library.

In the late 19th century the structure often served as a meeting place for railroad officials and the Brooklyn Republican Campaign Committee. Colonel Charles L. Fincke, of the 23rd Regiment of the United States National Guard, maintained an office at the Garfield Building. It also was home to lawyers.

The Garfield Building was razed after a period of building inactivity following World War I. City departments were moved to a new Municipal Building and the Court Remsen Building. The Chanin Construction Company, led by Irwin Chanin, bought the building from the Childs Restaurants chain for $1.3 million and announced plans in 1924 to construct a 26-story building on the site for $4 million. The developer, the 26 Court Street Corporation, filed a lawsuit later that year, which sought to overturn an old covenant that banned development within 8 ft (2.4 m) of the sidewalk on Court Street. The dispute was prolonged because many neighboring property owners opposed the proposed annulment of the covenant. By May 1925, the Chanin Construction Company was demolishing the edifice. During demolition, several workers were nearly killed after the building partially collapsed.
