= Belbas Center =

- Old Armory-Vermillion
- U.S. National Register of Historic Places
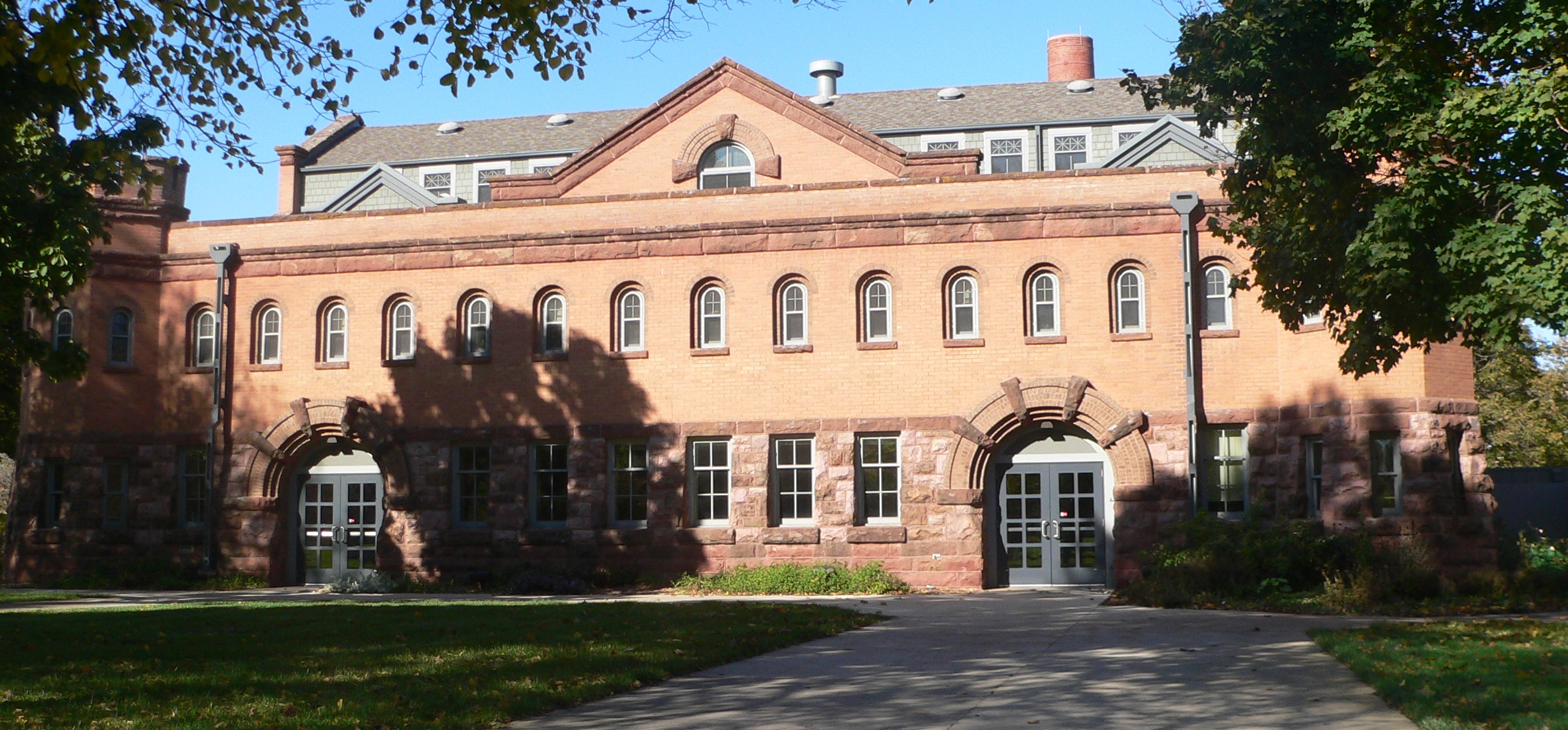
- Belbas Center from the front

- Location within South Dakota
- Location: Vermillion, South Dakota
- Coordinates: 42°47′03″N 96°55′31″W
- Built: 1905
- Architects: Frank Kinney and Menno Detweiler
- Architectural style: Richardsonian Romanesque
- NRHP reference No.: 02001285
- Added to NRHP: October 31, 2002

The Dean Belbas Center, referred to simply as the Belbas Center or the Old Armory, is a historic building on the University of South Dakota campus. Originally constructed in 1905 as an armory, it has been repurposed multiple times over the years; it has served as a barracks, an athletics building, and a recreation ground. Currently, the admissions, registrar, and financial aid offices are located there.

== Architecture ==
The armory was designed by Minnesotan architects Frank Kinney and Menno Detweiler in the Richardsonian Romanesque style, although it also boasts Grecian-style windows. The building is made out of rough-cut stone and brick, with a base of red Sioux Quartzite. Castle-like turrets sit on the southeast and southwest corners. A flag tower on top of the southwestern tower was removed in the 1960s. It is three stories in the northern half but only two stories in the south half.

== History ==
The University of South Dakota was lacking space by 1900 and began constructing new buildings at that time. The new armory and gymnasium building was completed in January 1905, with the intent of being used mainly as a military base. The interior was largely open; the space could be used for military drills as well as sports and recreation. By 1907, it became clear that a military presence on campus was not necessary, and the building became a full-time athletics facility. It was here that all of USD's home basketball games were held until 1929. Due to its open floor plan, it also became an ideal venue for student organizations to host parties and dances.

In 1918, with World War I drawing to a close, the building shifted back into the secondary role of a campus arsenal and barracks. The campus ROTC also had its headquarters here. In 1929, a new armory building was completed, which today is the Al Neuharth Media Center. All military operations moved into the new building, and the Old Armory became home to the women's gymnasium and physical education program. It was used in this capacity until the mid-1960s, at which time it became a multipurpose space that housed the campus radio, a dance class space, and a general wellness center. By the 1980s, it was used only as storage and as a facilities management building.
