= Garfield Township Hall =

- U.S. National Register of Historic Places
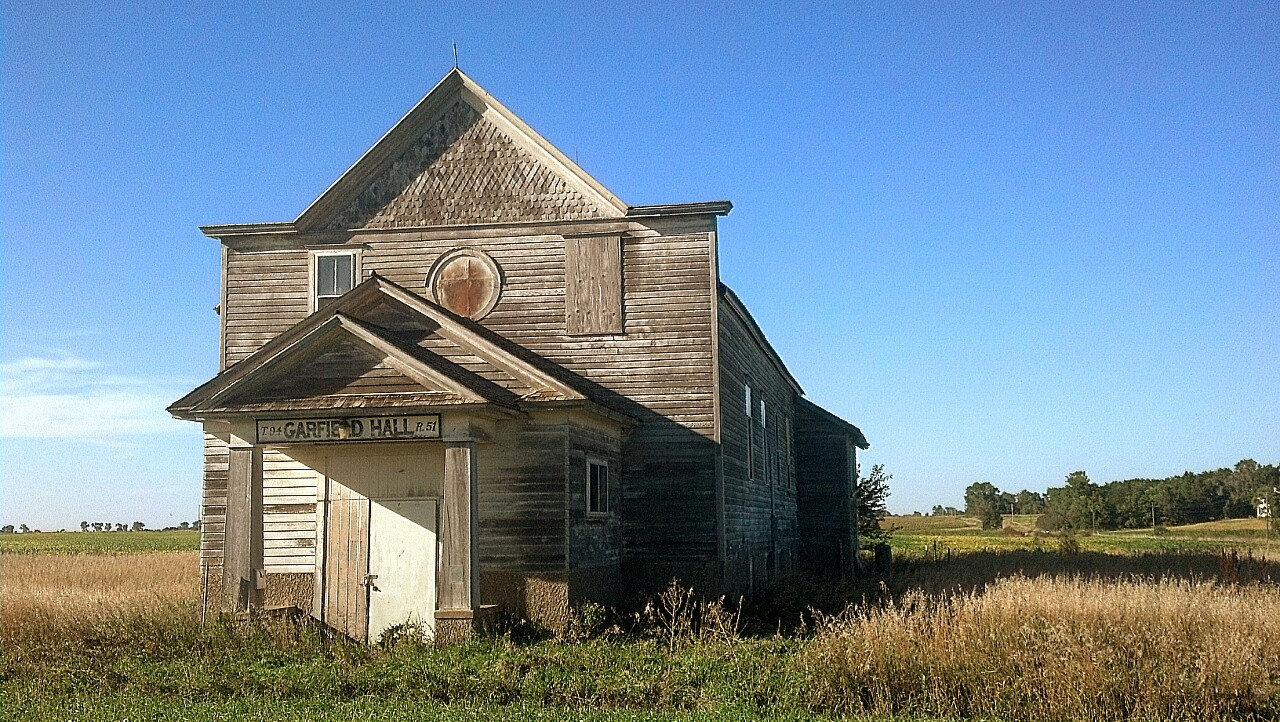

- Location within South Dakota Location within the United States
- Location: 46667 306th Street
- Nearest city: Beresford, South Dakota
- Coordinates: 42°57′08″N 96°51′50″W
- Area: 1 acre (0.40 ha)
- Built: c. 1908
- Built by: Unknown; WPA (addition and alterations)
- Architectural style: Late 19th And 20th Century Revivals
- NRHP reference No.: 03001523
- Added to NRHP: January 28, 2004

Garfield Township Hall is a two-story historic building located near Beresford in rural Clay County, South Dakota. It served the now-defunct Garfield Township in Clay County. It was added to the National Register of Historic Places in 2004.

== History ==
The township of Garfield was established in 1880, at a time when the surrounding region of Dakota Territory was being settled and developed from early trading posts and forts along the Missouri River. Constructed around 1908, the township hall created a central space for nearby pioneers to conduct business, instead of having to hold events and transactions in their private residences. It served variably as a polling place, a theater, a local government office, and a public meeting space. Around 1936, the Works Progress Administration added a basement and renovated the building's facade to its present appearance. Although most other township halls in the area have been abandoned for decades, Garfield Township Hall is one of the few that remain standing.

== Architecture ==
Although there are hints of Queen Anne influence on its roof shingles, the township hall building technically has no distinctive style and is described as a simple wooden rectangular building with a gabled roof, with two stories and a basement. It has a false front facade characteristic of many contemporary buildings in the Old West. One circular window is centered between two windows above the front pediment. The outside of the building is undecorated. A chimney sits on the north exterior wall of the building. All of its two-over-two double-hung windows are now boarded up to protect against vandalism.

An interior staircase in the center of the building provides access to the other floors. The first floor contains a ticket booth and restrooms that were used for public events. The first and second floors are combined in the theater area to widen the space, with the second floor providing extra seating, and an elevated stage runs along the northern wall.
