= Garfield Elementary School (Moline, Illinois) =

- U.S. National Register of Historic Places
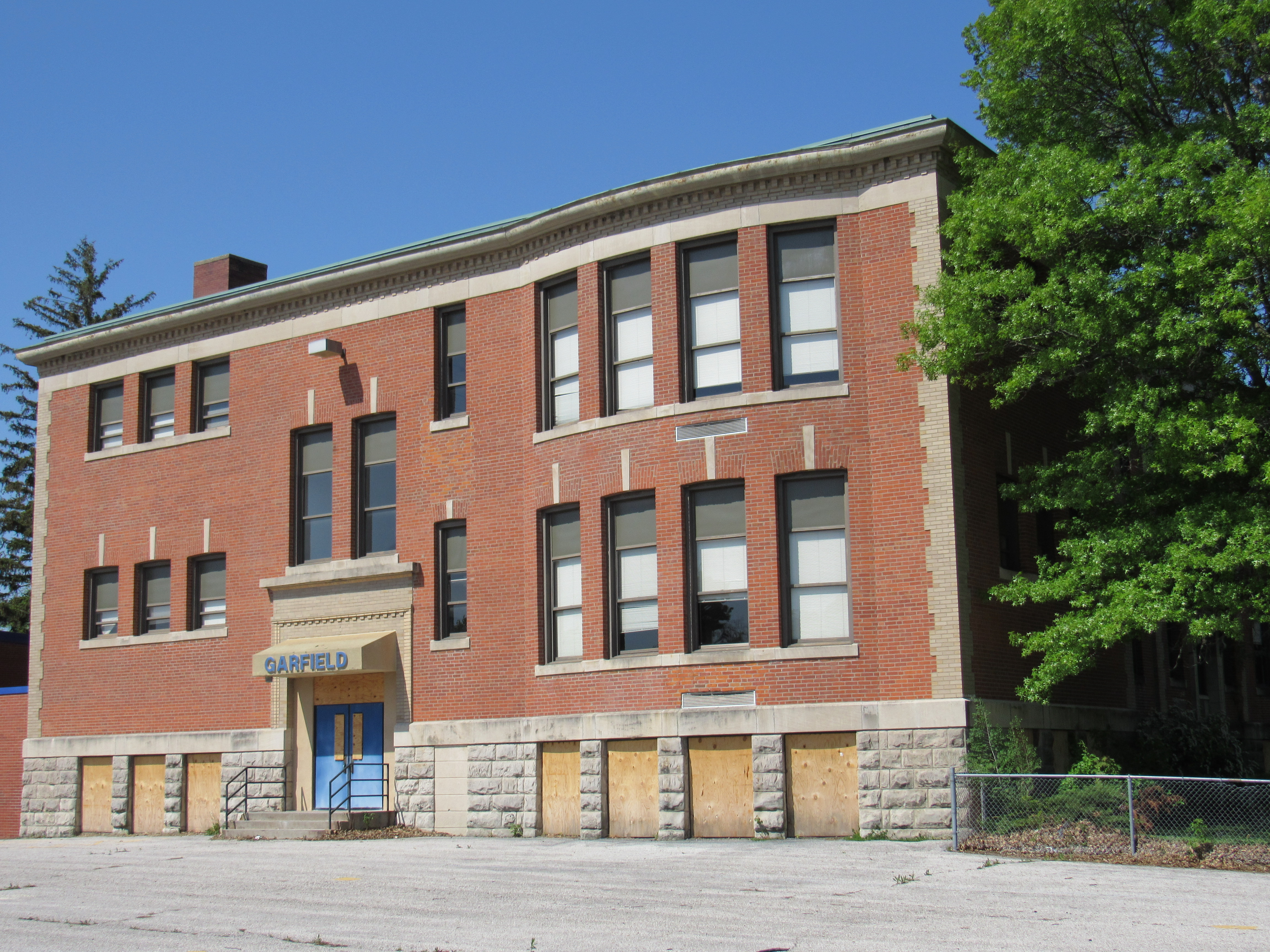

- Location within Illinois Location within the United States
- Location: 1518 25th Ave. Moline, Illinois
- Coordinates: 41°29′14″N 90°30′53″W
- Area: less than one acre
- Built: 1902
- Architect: Olof Z. Cervin
- Architectural style: Classical Revival
- NRHP reference No.: 100000848
- Added to NRHP: April 10, 2017

Garfield Elementary School is a historic school building located at 1518 25th Avenue in Moline, Illinois. The school was built in 1902 to replace the original Garfield Elementary, which had burned down the previous year. The original school opened in the 1870s and was the first to serve Moline's Stewartville neighborhood; when the new school opened in 1902, it was still the only school in Stewartville. Local architect Olof Z. Cervin designed the brick Classical Revival building. In 1955, an addition designed by William F. Bernbrock provided the school with a new gymnasium and more classrooms.

The school closed in 2015 and was sold to private developers. It was added to the National Register of Historic Places on April 10, 2017. It is one of the three oldest public school buildings in Moline and the only surviving public school building in Stewartville.
