= Clay County Courthouse (Tennessee) =

- U.S. National Register of Historic Places
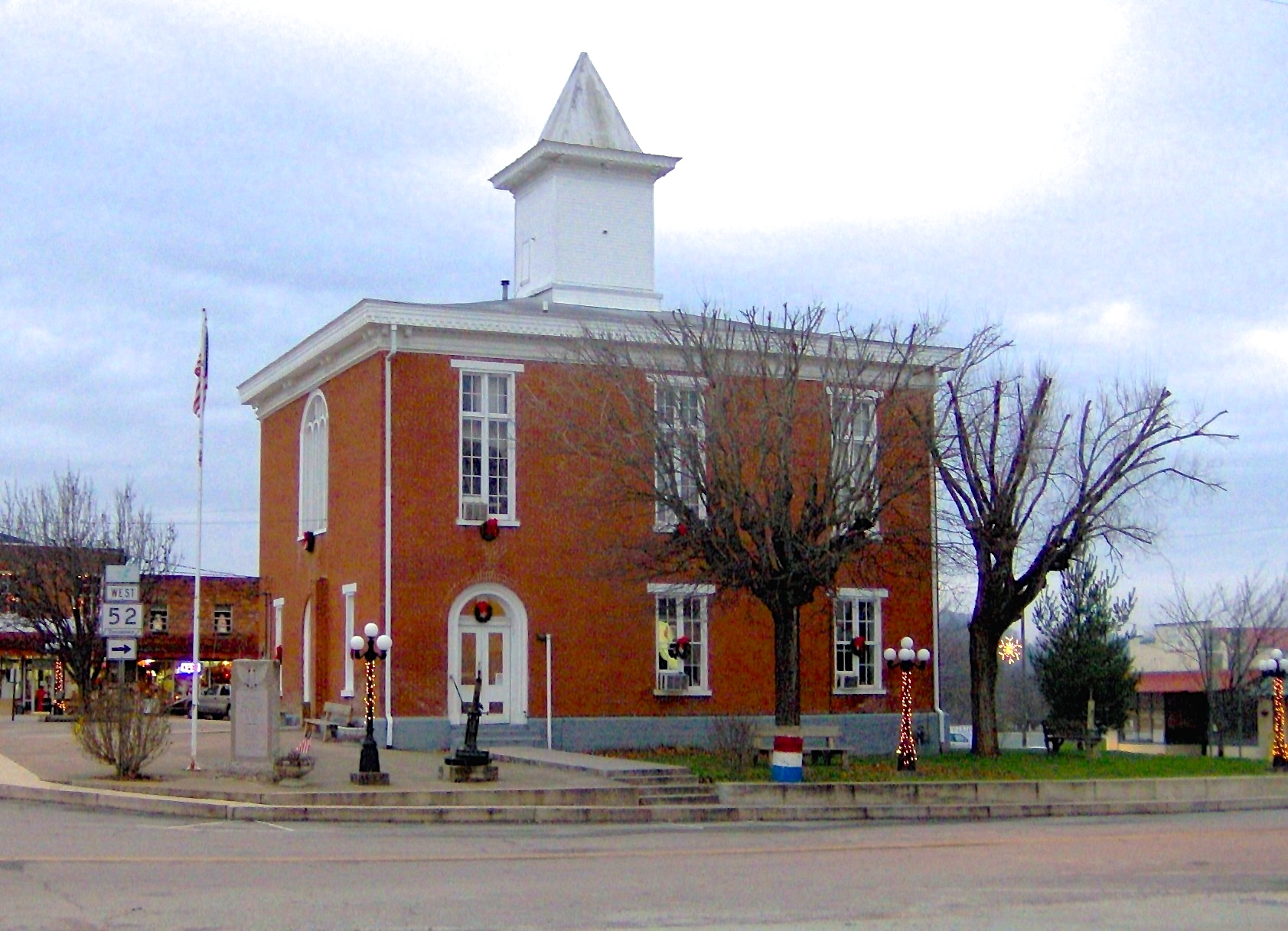

- Location within Tennessee Location within the United States
- Location: State Route 52, Celina, Tennessee
- Coordinates: 36°33′02″N 85°30′22″W
- Area: 0.5 acres (0.20 ha)
- Built: 1873
- Built by: D.L. Dow
- NRHP reference No.: 77001261
- Added to NRHP: September 22, 1977

The Clay County Courthouse in Celina, Tennessee is a historic courthouse built in 1873. It was listed on the National Register of Historic Places in 1977.

It is the first county courthouse ever serving Clay County. It is a two-story brick building with brick laid in common bond, located on State Route 52.

== History ==
Plans for erecting the courthouse began in 1870, and construction began in 1872 with the contract price of $9,999. The first court session was held in 1874.
