= Inman House =

- U.S. National Register of Historic Places
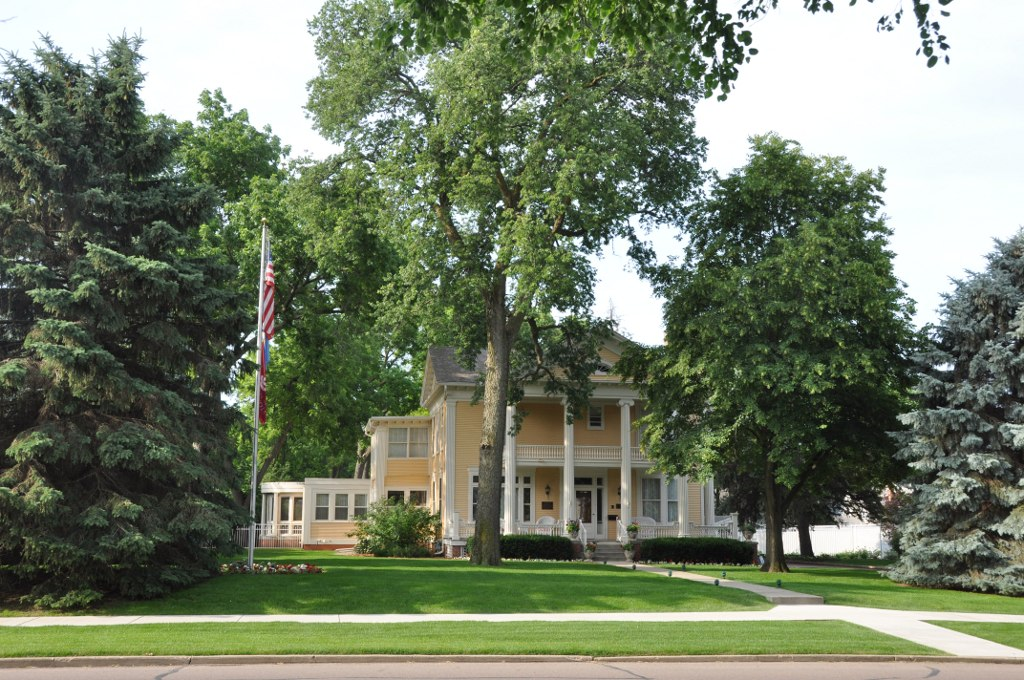
- Inman House from the front

- Location within South Dakota
- Location: 415 E. Main St., Vermillion, South Dakota
- Coordinates: 42°46′45″N 96°55′31″W
- Area: less than one acre
- Built: 1882
- Architectural style: Classical Revival
- NRHP reference No.: 76001723
- Added to NRHP: May 24, 1976

Inman House, formerly known as the University of South Dakota Alumni House, is a historic American building in Vermillion, South Dakota. It is currently a private residence for the president of the University of South Dakota. It was added to the National Register of Historic Places in 1976.

== History ==
This house was built in 1882 as a private residence by Darwin M. and Adele Inman after the couple lost their previous home in the 1881 Vermillion flood. Darwin, a native of New York state, had moved to the area in 1874. Darwin used his influence to successfully campaign for state funds to build the University of Dakota (now the University of South Dakota) in Vermillion; once it was installed, he served as president of the executive committee and later as a trustee. Darwin also founded the First National Bank of Vermillion and served as president there until his death in 1913. After Adele had also died, a relative donated the house to the University of South Dakota in 1941. It became the official residence of the president of USD until 1968, at which time the USD Alumni Association and the USD Historical Preservation Center moved their headquarters there. After it was added to the NRHP in 1976, Inman House returned to its function as a university presidential residence. When Inman House underwent interior renovations in 2018, the property next door—403 East Main Street—was also purchased. This neighboring property was turned into Founders Park in late 2021.

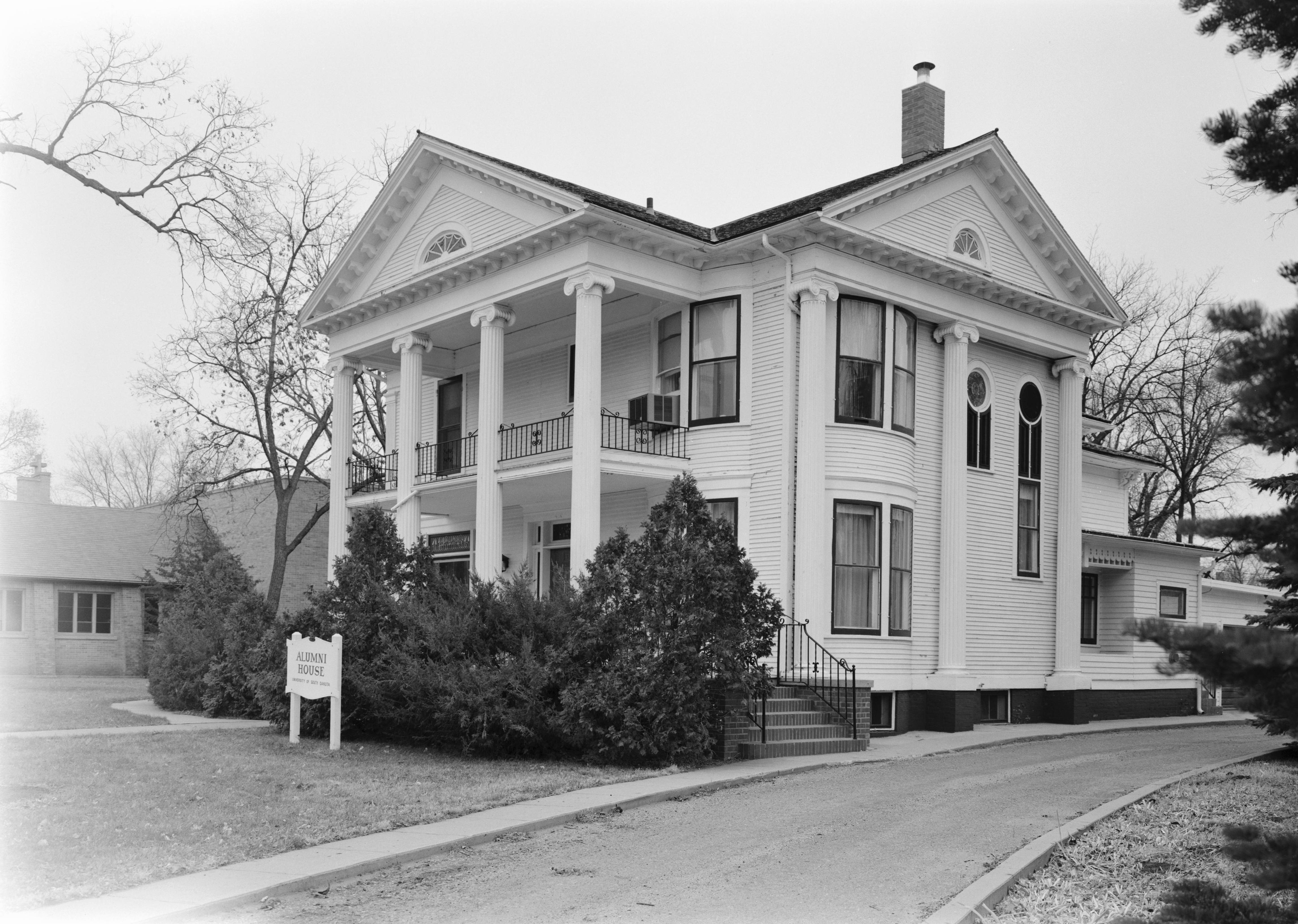
Inman House, 1976

== Architecture ==
The original two-story frame was completed in 1882; in 1883, the Inmans added another two-story addition. Darwin did renovations around 1900, removing the original gingerbread trim and replacing it with Neo-Classical decor. Four two-story Ionic columns support the large pediment above the front entrance and porch. Around the back of the building is a large sunroom that projects into the backyard. The interior is meticulously decorated; the Inmans trimmed their wallpaper with 14 karat gold and had murals painted across the walls and ceilings of the parlor. It is notable as "the most outstanding example of a Neo-Classical style home in Vermillion".
