= First National Bank Building of Vermillion =

- U.S. National Register of Historic Places
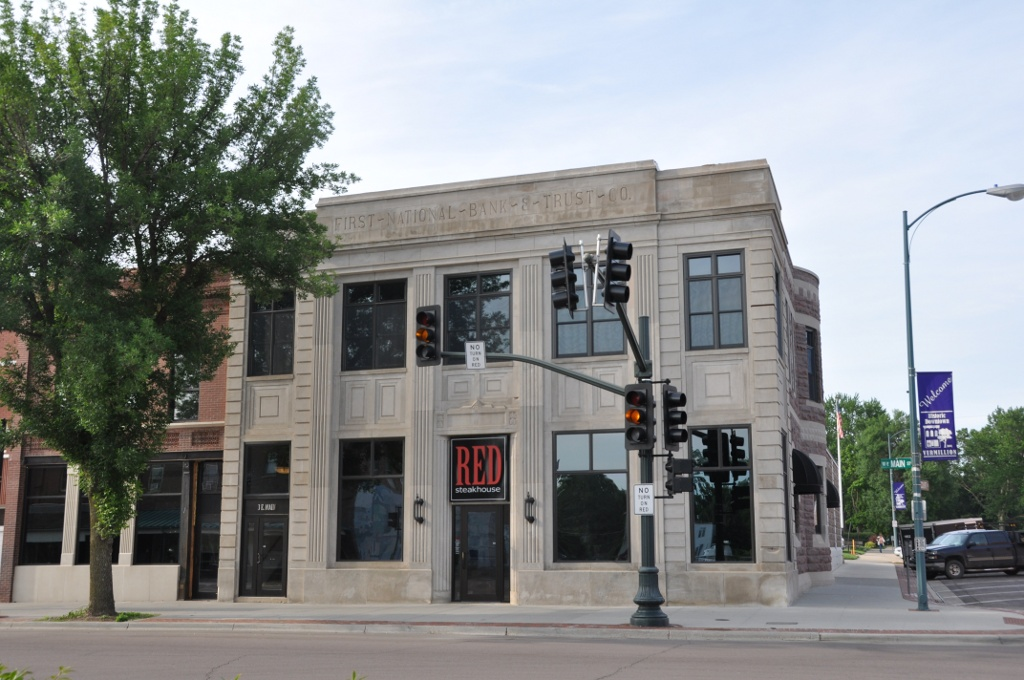

- Location within South Dakota Location within the United States
- Location: 1 E. Main St., Vermillion, South Dakota
- Coordinates: 42°46′45″N 96°55′54″W
- Area: 0.1 acres (0.040 ha)
- Built: 1893
- Architectural style: Classical Revival
- NRHP reference No.: 86000244
- Added to NRHP: February 13, 1986

The First National Bank Building of Vermillion, also known as the Old Bank Building, is a historic building at 1 East Main Street in Vermillion, South Dakota. It was added to the National Register of Historic Places in 1986.

The original building was constructed in 1893 out of granite in the Romanesque Revival style. Darwin H. Inman, an early investor and founder of Vermillion, founded D.H. Inman and Company in 1875, which became the First National Bank of Vermillion. Originally located on Broadway Street, an 1881 flood destroyed most of Vermillion; however, the bank building survived and moved atop the bluff to the corner of Main and Court Streets. By 1890, the bank was thriving and was dubbed "one of the most viable and prosperous private banking firms in Dakota". Inman had it chartered as the First National Bank of Vermillion in 1891, making it Vermillion's first chartered bank. An 1892 fire destroyed the building, but it was rebuilt in 1893; it is this structure that still stands today. The bank became the center of financial business in Vermillion; it provided vital loans to farmers and even gave out Christmas presents to customers. Inman died in 1913; his residence is also listed on the NRHP.

By 1925, under the leadership of the second president Myron Thompson, the bank had become the largest financial institution in Clay County. After Thompson's death in 1929, The First National Bank of Vermillion was sold to a holding company before it merged with the Vermillion National Bank, and the new owners completed a major remodel in February 1930. The outside facade was extended to include a small neighboring building and was redone in a Classical Revival style. "First National Bank & Trust Co." is engraved on the top cornice. Four stone pilasters now divide the exterior into five parts, each containing large rectangular windows. Modillion blocks, subtle stone quoins, and geometric designs popular during this era decorate the surface. In the 1980s, it was being used as offices and then entered a period of vacancy. It was the site of RED Steakhouse from 2010 until 2020, when the restaurant announced its closing.
