= Gunderson House =

- U.S. National Register of Historic Places
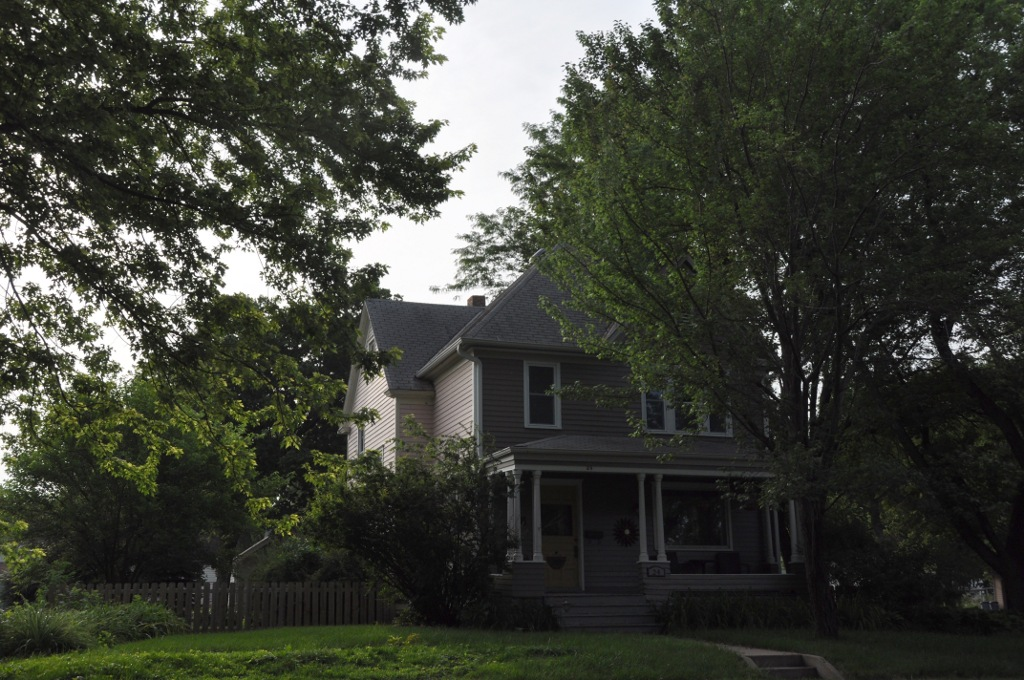
- Gunderson House from the front, 2012

- Location within South Dakota Location within the United States
- Location: 24 South Harvard Street, Vermillion, South Dakota
- Coordinates: 42°46′38″N 96°55′39″W
- Area: less than one acre
- Built: 1895
- Built by: Harvey Gunderson
- Architectural style: Queen Anne
- NRHP reference No.: 01000092
- Added to NRHP: February 9, 2001

The Gunderson House is a historic residence located at 24 South Harvard Street in Vermillion, South Dakota. It was listed on the National Register of Historic Places in 2001, due to being a notable example of Queen Anne architecture in Clay County.

The house's builder, Harvey Gunderson, moved to Dakota Territory by way of Wisconsin in 1869 and purchased a 160-acre farm in the Vermillion area. In 1895, he built this house for his family, which at the time was still on the outskirts of town. Today, Gunderson House sits near the center of Vermillion, borders the Forest Avenue Historic District, and is a few blocks from the University of South Dakota. It is still a private residence.

== Architecture ==
Gunderson House is a classic example of Queen Anne style architecture—and specifically, the Free Classic subtype—which was popular in the Midwest during the Late Victorian and Edwardian eras. It is two stories tall and sits on a foundation made of Sioux Quartzite. Its steep cross-gabled roof is entirely clad in asphalt shingles. Its siding was originally wooden clapboard; between 1978 and 2000, it had aluminum siding, but the wood was restored after this time. A raised porch spans the entire front façade and features paired classic columns and a simple frieze. The large picture window on the ground floor that overlooks the porch was installed in the 1960s. A chimney sits on the south side of the house, next to a large bay projection in the center of the elevation. The Gunderson family added an extension to the rear of the house in 1928. A small solarium was later added to the building in 1971. One non-contributing building, a two-port garage, was added at the rear of the property in 1990.
