= Burbank, South Dakota =

- Unincorporated community
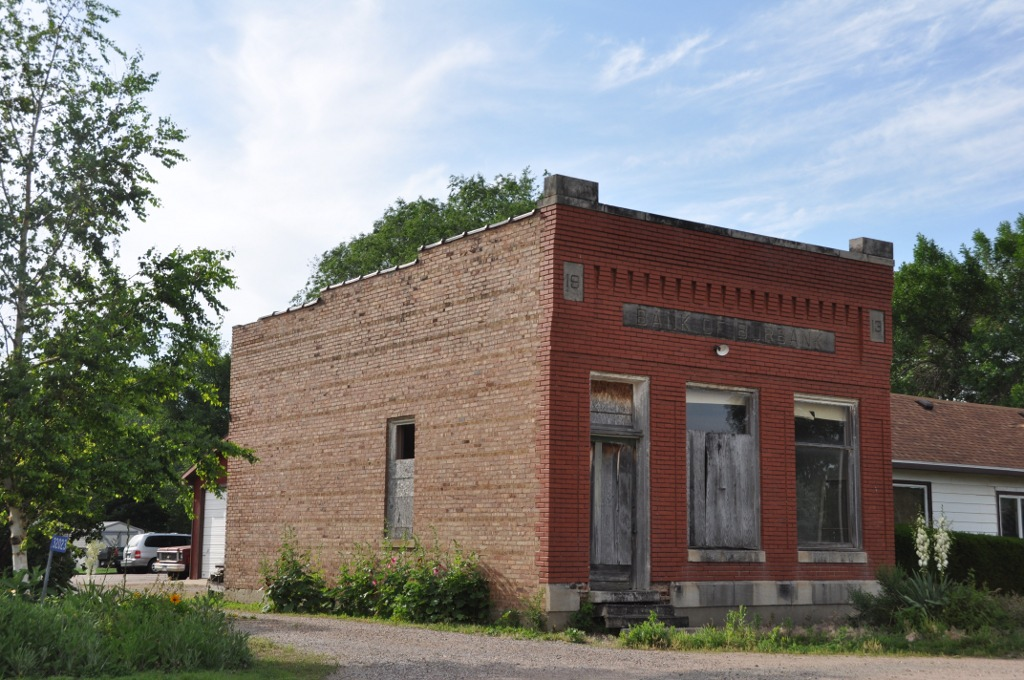
- The old Bank of Burbank building

- Location within the state of South Dakota Burbank (the United States)
- Coordinates: 42°44′48″N 96°49′54″W
- Country: United States
- State: South Dakota
- County: Clay

Area
  - Total: 0.31 sq mi (0.80 km^{2})
  - Land: 0.31 sq mi (0.80 km^{2})
  - Water: 0 sq mi (0.00 km^{2})
- Elevation: 1,142 ft (348 m)

Population (2020)
  - Total: 93
  - Density: 303.0/sq mi (116.97/km^{2})
- Time zone: UTC-6 (Central (CST))
  - Summer (DST): UTC-5 (CDT)
- ZIP codes: 57010
- FIPS code: 46-08500
- GNIS feature ID: 2813011

Burbank is an unincorporated community and a census-designated place (CDP) in Clay County, South Dakota, United States. The population was 93 at the 2020 census.

Burbank was laid out in 1873, and it is named in honor of John A. Burbank, the fourth Governor of Dakota Territory.

== Demographics ==
Historical population
Census	Pop.	Note	%±
2020	93		—
U.S. Decennial Census

== Education ==
The school district is Vermillion School District 13-1.

== Notable person ==
- Kelley Jorgensen - Contestant on Big Brother 27
