= Sims-Garfield Ranch =

- U.S. National Register of Historic Places
- Location within Montana Location within the United States
- Location: East of Ryegate, Montana
- Coordinates: 46.30161°N 109.21248°W
- Area: 5 acres (2.0 ha)
- Built: 1877
- Built by: Sims, Joseph; Schaff, Victor
- NRHP reference No.: 80002419
- Added to NRHP: August 27, 1980

The Sims-Garfield Ranch is a site on the National Register of Historic Places located near Ryegate, Montana. It was added to the Register on August 27, 1980. The listing included six contributing buildings:

- An original log cabin built by John T. Sally, perhaps as early as 1855
- A six-room log house built by Joseph Sims in c. 1878
- A ranch house built by the Victor Schaff family in 1910, renovated in 1927 and in 1942
- A log barn, built in c. 1878
- A stone barn, built in the 1880s
- A frame board barn
