= Garfield School (Sault Ste. Marie, Michigan) =

- U.S. National Register of Historic Places
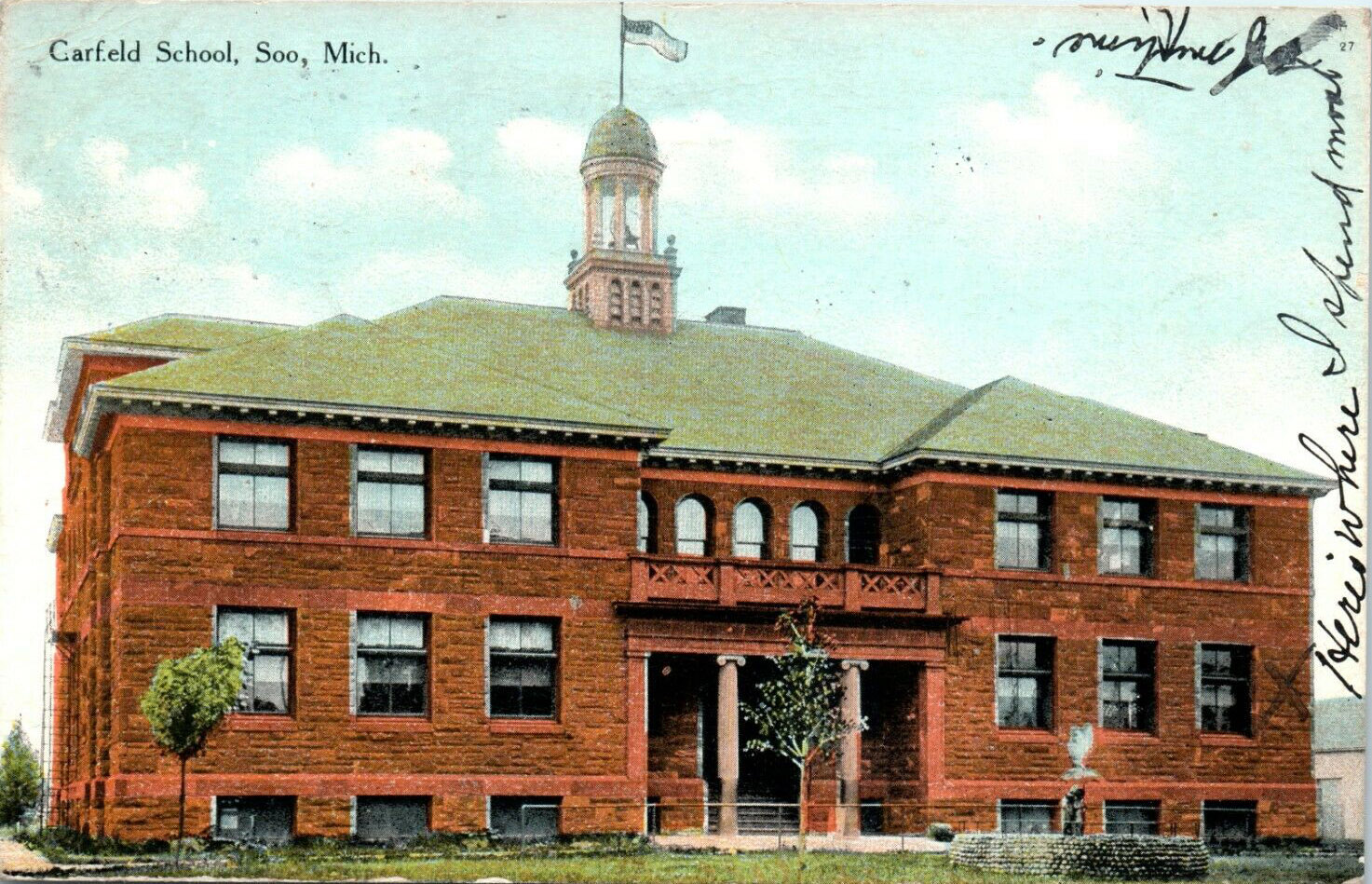
- Garfield School, c. 1913

- Location within Michigan Location within the United States
- Interactive map showing building location
- Location: 510 East Spruce St., Sault Ste. Marie, Michigan
- Coordinates: 46°29′41″N 84°20′18″W
- Built: 1898
- Built by: Lipsett & Gregg
- Architect: Charlton, Gilbert, & Demar
- NRHP reference No.: 10000219
- Added to NRHP: April 14, 2022

The Garfield School, also known as the Garfield Commons, is a former school building located at 510 East Spruce Street in Sault Ste. Marie, Michigan. It was listed on the National Register of Historic Places in 2022.

== History ==
The Third Ward of Sault Ste. Marie was originally served by the Seymour School, a one-room schoolhouse constructed in 1876. However, despite its enlargement in the mid-1880s, this school was at capacity by 1897. The school board hired the Marquette architectural firm of Charlton, Gilbert, & Demar to design the Garfield School as a replacement, and the local firm of Lipsett & Gregg to construct it. The building was completed in 1898.

The school remained as built until 1952, when a covered basement exit and an addition containing a gymnasium were added to the building. However, by the 1960s, the Garfield School was already the oldest in the district, and in 1970 the school's students were relocated to the former junior high school building. The district continued to use the building for support services until 1989, after which the district sold the building. In the 2010s, there were plans to rehabilitate the building into a community center known as the "Garfield Commons," but no steps had been taken to do so. In 2022, plans were announced to renovate the school into 14 apartments, keeping most of the existing historical structure.

== Description ==
The Garfield School is a two-story, rough-faced Marquette brownstone main building with a 1952 red brick addition containing a gymnasium. The original building has an I-shaped footprint and sits on a raised basement. Smooth brownstone bands run at the water table, first floor window lintel and second floor windowsill lines. A wood cornice with egg and dart molding and carved brackets supporting the deep roof eaves tops the walls. The gable roof runs side-to-side, with hipped roofs over the projections located at the four corners of the building. The gymnasium and a connector are both clad in red brick and have flat roofs. The building remains much as it was constructed, save for the removal of the original roof cupola and the original entrance porch and stone columns.
