= Garfield Street Historic District =

Historic district in Massachusetts, United States

- U.S. National Register of Historic Places
- U.S. Historic district
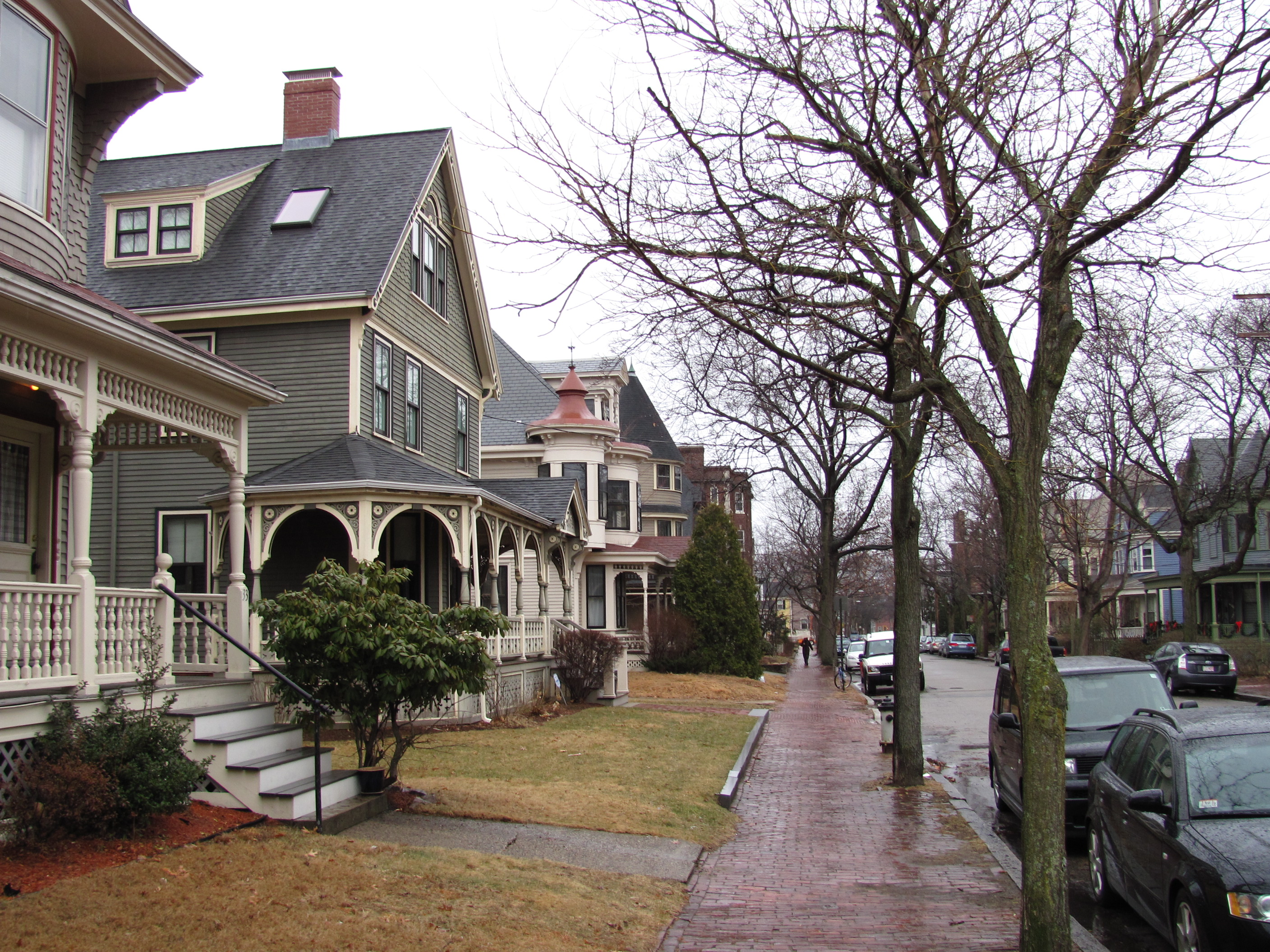
- Looking east on Garfield Street

- Location within Massachusetts Location within the United States
- Location: Cambridge, Massachusetts
- Coordinates: 42°23′2″N 71°7′6″W
- Built: 1885
- Architect: Multiple
- Architectural style: Queen Anne
- MPS: Cambridge MRA
- NRHP reference No.: 83000803
- Added to NRHP: June 30, 1983

The Garfield Street Historic District is a historic district on Garfield Street between Massachusetts Ave. and Oxford Street in Cambridge, Massachusetts. The district encompasses a unified residential area developed between 1885 and 1891. Garfield Street was laid out in 1883, and all but three of the houses built before 1891 still stand on the street. The houses were built by different developers, and most were architect designed, and thus vary stylistically. The streetview, however, is unified by uniform lot sizes, house heights, and setbacks. Queen Anne styling predominates, with a variety of massing and roof lines; many houses have turrets and/or wraparound porches typical of that style.

The district was listed on the National Register of Historic Places in 1983.

== See also ==
- National Register of Historic Places listings in Cambridge, Massachusetts
