= Wakonda State Bank =

- U.S. National Register of Historic Places
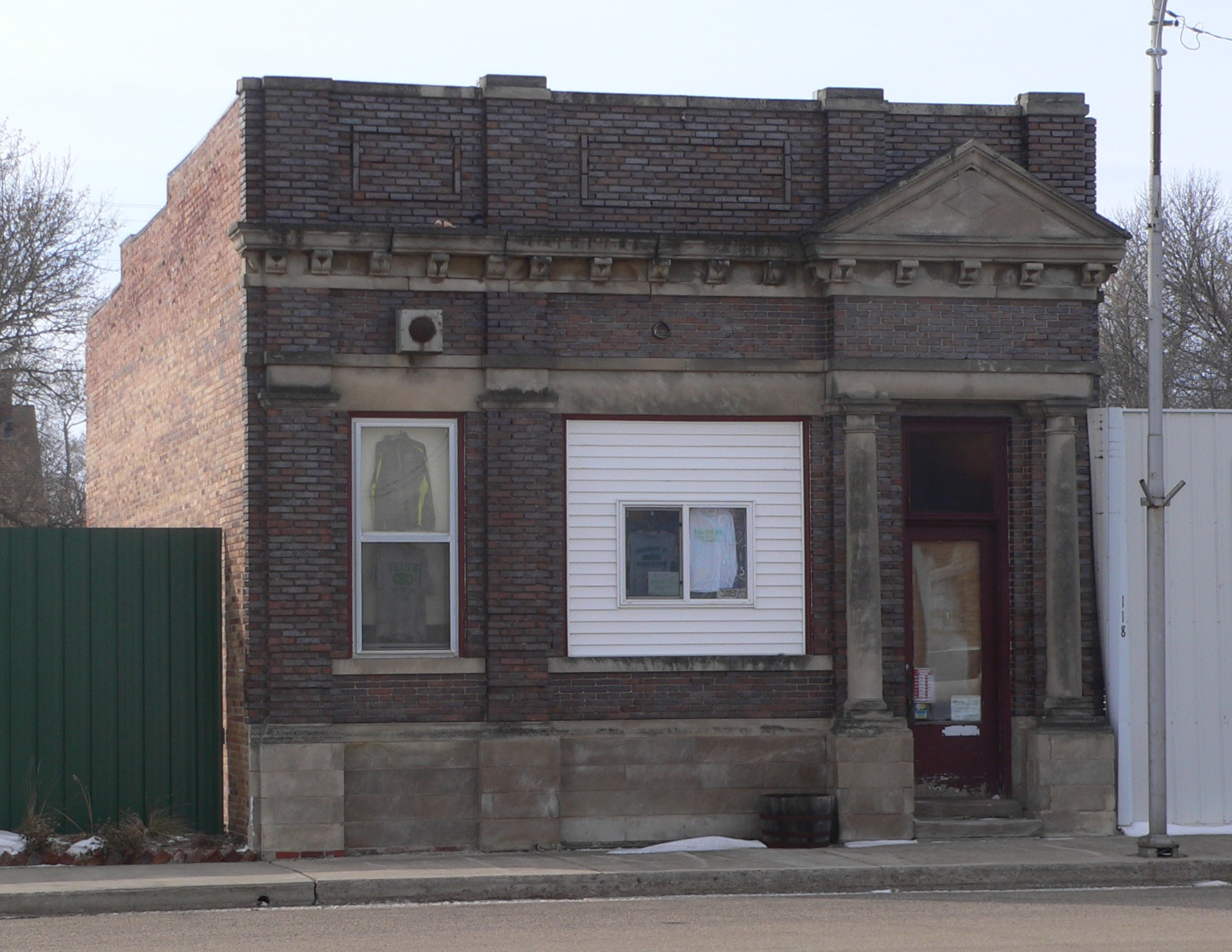
- The Wakonda State Bank building in 2016

- Location within South Dakota Location within the United States
- Location: 118 Ohio St., Wakonda, South Dakota
- Coordinates: 43°00′31″N 97°06′26″W
- Area: less than one acre
- Built: 1913
- Architectural style: Early Commercial
- NRHP reference No.: 03000765
- Added to NRHP: August 15, 2003

The Wakonda State Bank, later the Wakonda Public Library, is a historic bank building at 118 Ohio Street in Wakonda, South Dakota. It was listed on the National Register of Historic Places in 2003 due to being a rare surviving local example of early 20th-century architecture.

== History ==
The community of Wakonda, which was established in 1884, began to grow during the last decades of the 19th century as the Chicago and Northwestern Railroad planned to establish a station in the town. After the beginning of the 20th century, multiple buildings in the small community were lost in fires. Following a 1906 fire that destroyed the wooden building formerly located at 118 Ohio Street, construction on a new brick building began at that address. This building, completed in 1913, served as the town's bank. Due to its construction material, it survived a 1917 fire. At the advent of the Great Depression, the Wakonda State Bank struggled, kept afloat only by local investors. Despite their efforts, the Bank of Wakonda went into receivership and closed in 1931. Following this, the investors opened a new bank, the Security State Bank, in the building shortly thereafter. It operated under multiple different names until 1961, at which point the building was converted into the Wakonda Public Library. By 2006, however, the library had closed and the building last housed a private business. On August 15, 2003, it was added to the National Register of Historic Places as one of the "few remaining historic buildings in the commercial core".

== Architecture ==
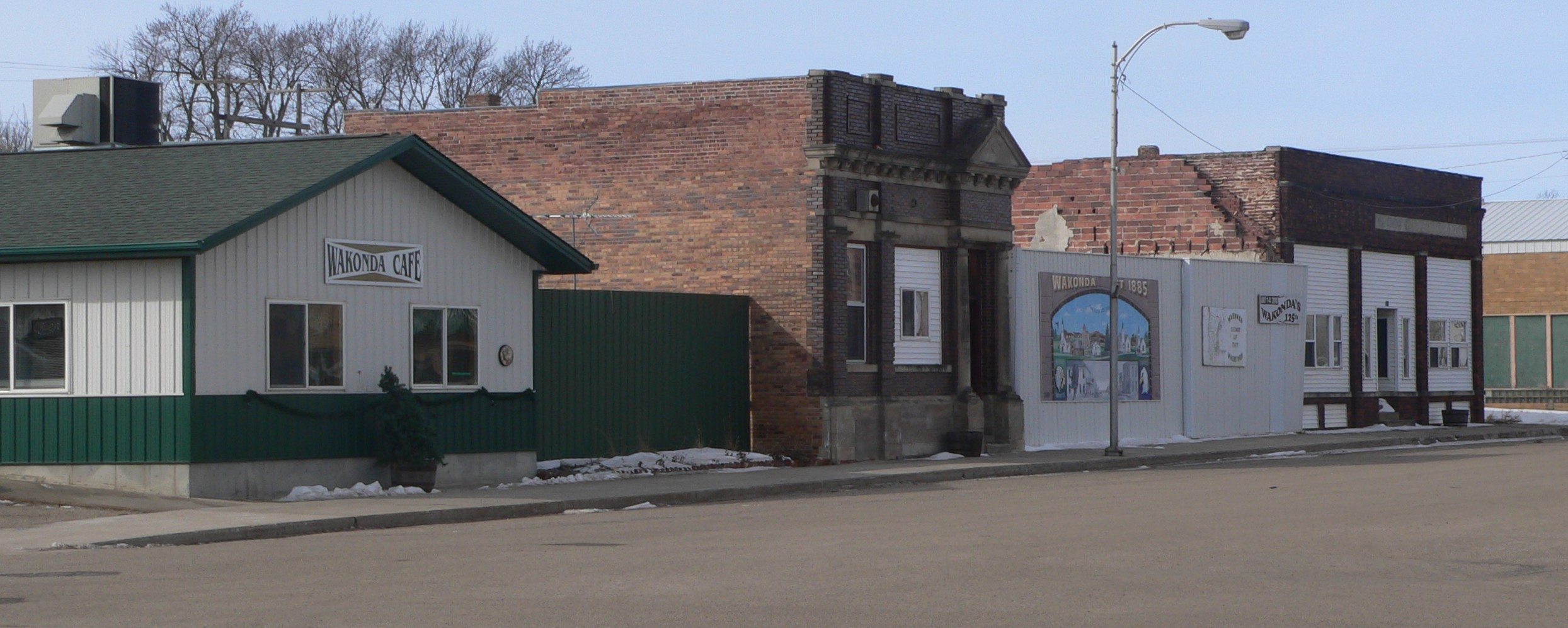
Wakonda State Bank building on Ohio Street

The Wakonda State Bank is a rare example of Early Commercial architecture with some Colonial Revival details; very few historic buildings are left standing in Wakonda. Constructed out of locally sourced brick and limestone on a stone foundation, it has not been heavily altered from its original appearance. The northeastern-facing front façade contains limestone blocks around the base. Brickwork and limestone pilasters divide the front into four bays—one at each corner and two in the middle—and extend past the height of the building. The flat roof is surrounded by a decorative parapet. Located at the northwestern corner of the front, the main entrance is bordered on both sides by limestone Doric columns that support an entablature and pediment. The interior ceiling is made of pressed tin and contains a skylight. At the back exterior wall of the building is a small brick chimney. The basement contains a small vault room.
