= Garfield Methodist Church =

Historic church in Arizona, United States

- U.S. National Register of Historic Places
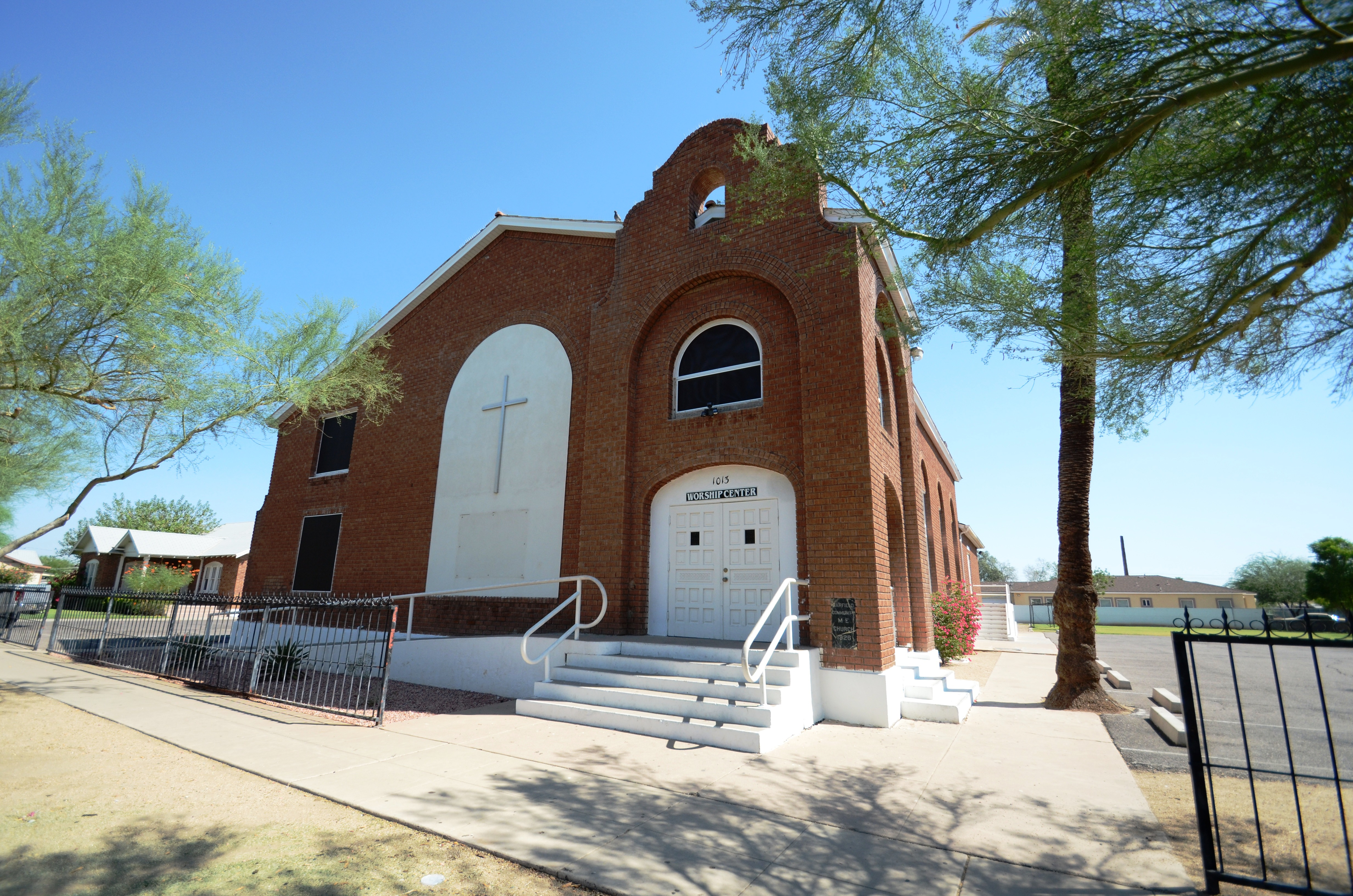

- Location within Arizona Location within the United States
- Location: 1302 E. Roosevelt St., Phoenix, Arizona
- Coordinates: 33°27′33″N 112°03′11″W
- Area: less than one acre
- Built: 1926
- Architect: Vere O. Wallingford
- Architectural style: Mission/spanish Revival
- MPS: Religious Architecture in Phoenix MPS
- NRHP reference No.: 93000743
- Added to NRHP: August 10, 1993

Garfield Methodist Church is a historic church at 1302 E. Roosevelt Street in Phoenix, Arizona.

It was built in 1926 in a Mission/Spanish Revival style. It was added to the National Register of Historic Places in 1993. It is currently home to Aim Right Ministries.

The church is a two-story 80 by 40 feet (24 m × 12 m) building designed by local architect Vere Wallingford. It is built of wire-cut bricks, with a gable roof, on a concrete foundation. It has a two-story corner entry vestibule resembling a bell tower.
