= Westville =

Westville may refer to:

in Canada

- Westville, Nova Scotia

in South Africa

- Westville, KwaZulu-Natal

in the United Kingdom

- Westville, Nottinghamshire
- Westville, Lincolnshire

in the United States

- Westville, California, an unincorporated community in Placer County
- Westville (New Haven), Connecticut, a neighborhood
- Westville, Florida, a town in Holmes County
- Westville (Georgia), an open-air museum town in the city of Columbus
- Westville, Illinois, a village in Vermilion County
- Westville, Indiana, a town in LaPorte County
- Westville, Monroe County, Mississippi, a village
- Westville, Simpson County, Mississippi, a ghost town
- Westville, Missouri, an unincorporated community
- Westville, New Jersey, a borough in Gloucester County
- Westville, New York, a town in Franklin County
- Westville, Oklahoma, a town in Adair County
- Westville, Pennsylvania, an unincorporated community
- Westville, South Carolina, an unincorporated community

== See also ==
- New Westville, Ohio
