= Clay County Courthouse (South Dakota) =

- U.S. National Register of Historic Places
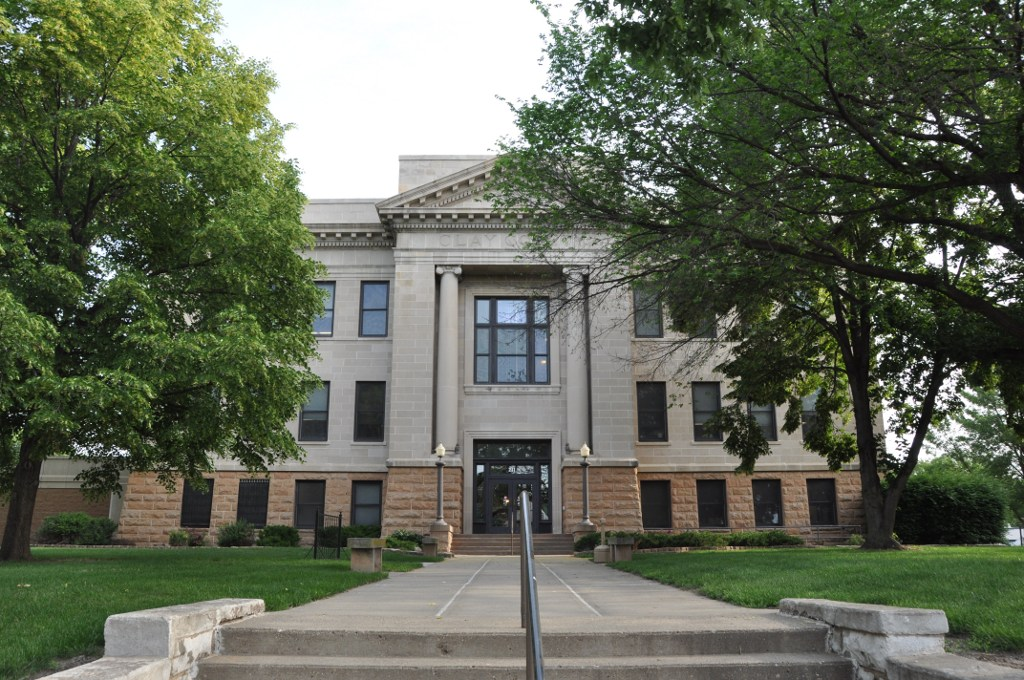

- Location within South Dakota Location within the United States
- Interactive map showing the location of Clay County Courthouse
- Location: 211 W. Main St., Vermillion, South Dakota
- Coordinates: 42°46′47″N 96°56′08″W
- Area: 4 acres (1.6 ha)
- Built: 1913
- Architect: Lloyd D. Willis
- Architectural style: Classical Revival
- NRHP reference No.: 83003005
- Added to NRHP: August 18, 1983

The Clay County Courthouse in Vermillion, South Dakota is a Classical Revival-style courthouse built in 1913. It was listed on the National Register of Historic Places in 1983.

It is a two-and-a-half-story building with stone veneer, on a raised basement.
