= Garfield Park =

Garfield Park may refer to:

- East Garfield Park, Chicago, a City of Chicago community area
- West Garfield Park, Chicago, a City of Chicago community area
- Garfield Park (Chicago), a park in the East Garfield Park neighborhood of Chicago known for its conservatory
- Garfield Park (Indianapolis), a park on the south side of Indianapolis known for its conservatory and sunken gardens
- Garfield Park, a park in Garfield Heights, Ohio
- Garfield Park, a playground in Washington, DC, under DPR (Department of Parks and Recreation), located at Third and G Streets SE (Ward 6)
- Garfield Square, a park in the Mission District of San Francisco that is also known as Garfield Park
- Piatt Park, a park in Cincinnati, Ohio that is also known as Garfield Park
- Three areas of Willingboro Township, New Jersey named Garfield Park, Garfield Park East, and Garfield North
- A small park in Oakland, California
- A park in Corvallis, Oregon
