= Kevin Rivers (songwriter) =

American entrepreneur (born 1987)

- Born: June 27, 1987 (age 38); Port Huron, Michigan, United States
- Occupations: Founder & Managing Partner of Black Ventures
- Spouses: Aleasha Lewis (m. 2012; div. 2019); Yu Mikami (m. 2020)
- Parent(s): Keith Rivers, Marlene Rivers
- Website: https://bvinternational.fund

Kevin Marlin Darrell Rivers (born June 27, 1987) is an American entrepreneur and founder of Black Ventures (formerly Rivers Company). Through Black Ventures, Rivers owns Global Media Bank and BV International.

== Early life ==
Rivers grew up in Michigan with his parents Keith and Marlene Rivers. In 1990, Rivers was introduced into music as a pianist. During his youth, Rivers wrote compositions and arrangements delving off of Ludwig van Beethoven and Johann Sebastian Bach. In 1994, Rivers won many awards, including but not limited to the Grand Prize at the Garfield Elementary School Talent Show. During his high school career, Rivers was fascinated with the world of business. In 2004, prior to founding Black Ventures, Rivers was considered a leader in many retail stores including Macy's, Belk, and Younkers. In 2007, Rivers attended DeVry University, where he studied business administration and social media.

== Career ==
In 2004, Rivers founded Black Ventures to build innovations through media, social, and digital entertainment. Since then, Rivers has led the company to establish brands that focused on distribution and Social Media. In 2009, Rivers was nominated for the OnHollywood 2009 Top 100 media companies list. Rivers was also interviewed by Vator to speak about his revolutionary business model. On January 13, 2010, Rivers established a new retailing deal with MediaNet, which garnered attention from Billboard. On April 6, 2010, Rivers launched the first full-fledged storefront, WaTunes, for Facebook. Rivers has been featured on news including TechCrunch and Music Week.

In 2012, Rivers launched Venzo Digital, an award-winning iTunes music distribution service that helped musicians generate over $2 million in revenue. On April 25, 2015, Venzo Digital was acquired by Lester Ventures.
