= Gayville, South Dakota =

- Town
- Location in Yankton County and the state of South Dakota
- Coordinates: 42°53′20″N 97°10′25″W
- Country: United States
- State: South Dakota
- County: Yankton
- Incorporated: 1892

Government
  - Mayor: Catalina Renteria (2025)

Area
  - Total: 0.20 sq mi (0.53 km^{2})
  - Land: 0.20 sq mi (0.53 km^{2})
  - Water: 0 sq mi (0.00 km^{2})
- Elevation: 1,165 ft (355 m)

Population (2020)
  - Total: 382
  - Density: 1,900/sq mi (720/km^{2})
- Time zone: UTC-6 (Central (CST))
  - Summer (DST): UTC-5 (CDT)
- ZIP code: 57031
- Area code: 605
- FIPS code: 46-23900
- GNIS feature ID: 1267402
- Website: www.gayvillesd.org

Gayville is a town in Yankton County, South Dakota, United States. The population was 382 at the 2020 census.

== History ==
Gayville was originally settled chiefly by Scandinavian farmers. A post office was established as White Hall in 1870, renamed Boreman in 1872, and again renamed Gayville in 1873. The present name honors Elkanah Gay, an early postmaster. Gayville was a station on the Chicago, Milwaukee, St. Paul and Pacific Railroad.

== Geography ==
According to the United States Census Bureau, the town has a total area of 0.21 square miles (0.54 km^{2}), all land.

South Dakota Highway 50 is located just south of the town. Gayville is approximately 22 miles west of I-29.

== Demographics ==
Historical population
Census	Pop.	Note	%±
1910	257		—
1920	305		18.7%
1930	261		−14.4%
1940	278		6.5%
1950	271		−2.5%
1960	261		−3.7%
1970	269		3.1%
1980	407		51.3%
1990	401		−1.5%
2000	418		4.2%
2010	407		−2.6%
2020	382		−6.1%
U.S. Decennial Census

=== 2010 census ===
As of the census of 2010, there were 407 people, 163 households, and 109 families residing in the town. The population density was 1,938.1 inhabitants per square mile (748.3/km^{2}). There were 179 housing units at an average density of 852.4 per square mile (329.1/km^{2}). The racial makeup of the town was 96.8% White, 0.7% Native American, 0.7% Asian, 0.7% from other races, and 1.0% from two or more races. Hispanic or Latino of any race were 1.2% of the population.

There were 163 households, of which 41.1% had children under the age of 18 living with them, 54.0% were married couples living together, 9.2% had a female householder with no husband present, 3.7% had a male householder with no wife present, and 33.1% were non-families. 28.2% of all households were made up of individuals, and 12.9% had someone living alone who was 65 years of age or older. The average household size was 2.50 and the average family size was 3.09.

The median age in the town was 34.1 years. 31.2% of residents were under the age of 18; 7.1% were between the ages of 18 and 24; 26.8% were from 25 to 44; 21.3% were from 45 to 64; and 13.5% were 65 years of age or older. The gender makeup of the town was 49.6% male and 50.4% female.

=== 2000 census ===
As of the census of 2000, there were 418 people, 169 households, and 111 families residing in the town. The population density was 2,181.3 inhabitants per square mile (842.2/km^{2}). There were 182 housing units at an average density of 949.7 per square mile (366.7/km^{2}). The racial makeup of the town was 95.45% White, 2.63% Native American, 0.24% Asian, 0.48% from other races, and 1.20% from two or more races. Hispanic or Latino of any race were 0.48% of the population.

There were 169 households, out of which 33.1% had children under the age of 18 living with them, 56.2% were married couples living together, 7.1% had a female householder with no husband present, and 34.3% were non-families. 30.2% of all households were made up of individuals, and 16.0% had someone living alone who was 65 years of age or older. The average household size was 2.47 and the average family size was 3.11.

In the town, the population was spread out, with 29.2% under the age of 18, 5.7% from 18 to 24, 28.9% from 25 to 44, 20.3% from 45 to 64, and 15.8% who were 65 years of age or older. The median age was 36 years. For every 100 females, there were 90.9 males. For every 100 females age 18 and over, there were 78.3 males.

As of 2000 the median income for a household in the town was $35,000, and the median income for a family was $45,682. Males had a median income of $27,344 versus $19,167 for females. The per capita income for the town was $13,535. About 6.7% of families and 9.4% of the population were below the poverty line, including 13.6% of those under age 18 and 10.5% of those age 65 or over.

== Notable people ==
- Marv Olson, professional baseball player
- Nels H. Smith, 18th governor of Wyoming
