= Clay County, South Dakota =

County in South Dakota, United States

- County
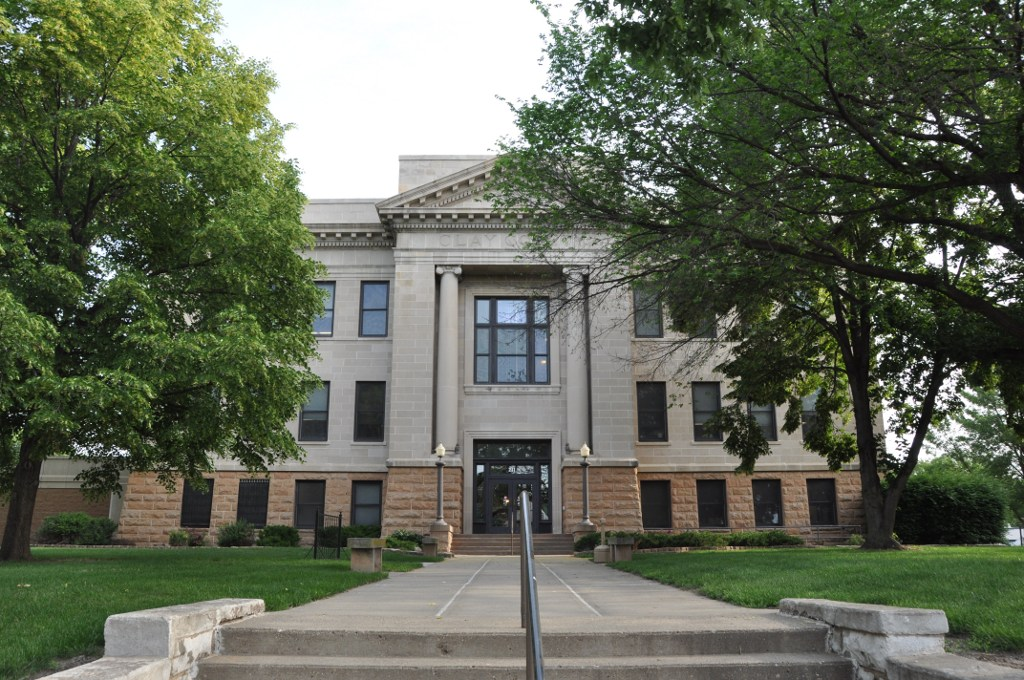
- Clay County Courthouse

- Location within the U.S. state of South Dakota
- Coordinates: 42°54′58.14″N 96°58′49.684″W
- Country: United States
- State: South Dakota
- Founded: April 10, 1862
- Named for: Henry Clay
- Seat: Vermillion
- Largest city: Vermillion

Area
  - Total: 417.419 sq mi (1,081.11 km^{2})
  - Land: 412.022 sq mi (1,067.13 km^{2})
  - Water: 5.397 sq mi (13.98 km^{2}) 1.3%

Population (2020)
  - Total: 14,967
  - Estimate (2025): 15,031 ▲
  - Density: 37.451/sq mi (14.460/km^{2})
- Time zone: UTC−6 (Central)
  - Summer (DST): UTC−5 (CDT)
- Congressional district: At-large
- Website: claycountysd.org

Clay County is a county in the U.S. state of South Dakota. As of the 2020 census, the population was 14,967, and was estimated to be 15,245 in 2024. The county seat is Vermillion, which is also home to the University of South Dakota. The county is named for Henry Clay, American statesman, US Senator from Kentucky, and United States Secretary of State in the 19th century. Clay County comprises the Vermillion, SD Micropolitan Statistical Area, which is also included in the Sioux City-Vermillion, Iowa-SD-Nebraska Combined Statistical Area.

== History ==
The future Clay County area was opened for legal settlement in 1859. In Autumn 1859, Ahira A. Partridge (who would become the first elected sheriff of the county) crossed the Missouri river into the Dakota territory, and became the first white man to settle, on 160 acres of land that now underlies Vermillion. In 1862 the county was formally organized. The Clay County Courthouse was built in 1912.

Clay County is the name of 17 other counties in the United States, most of them named for Henry Clay.

== Geography ==
Clay County lies on the south line of South Dakota. The south boundary line of Clay County abuts the north line of the state of Nebraska (across the Missouri River). The Missouri River flows southeast along the south boundary line of Clay County. A small drainage creek flows into the county from Turner County, draining the central and eastern portions of the county and discharging into the river. Smaller drainages move water from the western county areas into the river. In addition to sloping into the drainage through the center of the county, the terrain generally slopes to the south. The area is largely devoted to agriculture.

According to the United States Census Bureau, the county has a total area of 417.419 square miles (1,081.11 km^{2}), of which 412.022 square miles (1,067.13 km^{2}) is land and 5.397 square miles (13.98 km^{2}) (1.3%) is water. It is the 66th largest county in South Dakota by total area. It is the smallest county by area in South Dakota.

=== Adjacent counties ===
- Turner County – north
- Lincoln County – northeast
- Union County – east
- Dixon County, Nebraska – southeast
- Cedar County, Nebraska – southwest
- Yankton County – west

=== Major highways ===
- South Dakota Highway 19
- South Dakota Highway 46
- South Dakota Highway 50

=== Protected areas ===
- Missouri National Recreational River (part)
- Spirit Mound State Historic Prairie

== Demographics ==
Historical population
Census	Pop.	Note	%±
1870	2,621		—
1880	5,001		90.8%
1890	7,509		50.1%
1900	9,316		24.1%
1910	8,711		−6.5%
1920	9,654		10.8%
1930	10,088		4.5%
1940	9,592		−4.9%
1950	10,993		14.6%
1960	10,810		−1.7%
1970	12,923		19.5%
1980	13,689		5.9%
1990	13,186		−3.7%
2000	13,537		2.7%
2010	13,864		2.4%
2020	14,967		8.0%
2025 (est.)	15,031	▲	0.4%
U.S. Decennial Census; 1790–1960 1900–1990; 1990–2000 2010–2020

As of the third quarter of 2024, the median home value in Clay County was $230,280.

=== American Community Survey ===
As of the 2023 American Community Survey, there are 5,561 estimated households in Clay County with an average of 2.28 persons per household. The county has a median household income of $58,794. Approximately 17.5% of the county's population lives at or below the poverty line. Clay County has an estimated 66.6% employment rate, with 46.0% of the population holding a bachelor's degree or higher and 93.9% holding a high school diploma.

The top five reported ancestries (people were allowed to report up to two ancestries, thus the figures will generally add to more than 100%) were English (94.4%), Spanish (1.5%), Indo-European (1.3%), Asian and Pacific Islander (1.7%), and Other (1.0%).

The median age in the county was 24.5 years.

=== 2020 census ===
As of the 2020 census, there were 14,967 people, 5,564 households, and 2,795 families residing in the county. The population density was 36.3 inhabitants per square mile (14.0/km^{2}). There were 6,180 housing units, of which 10.0% were vacant. Among occupied housing units, 51.1% were owner-occupied and 48.9% were renter-occupied. The homeowner vacancy rate was 1.6% and the rental vacancy rate was 8.3%.

Of the residents, 17.2% were under the age of 18 and 13.1% were 65 years of age or older; the median age was 25.1 years. For every 100 females there were 90.6 males, and for every 100 females age 18 and over there were 87.4 males.

The racial makeup of the county was 85.6% White, 1.6% Black or African American, 4.0% American Indian and Alaska Native, 2.4% Asian, 1.1% from some other race, and 5.3% from two or more races. Hispanic or Latino residents of any race comprised 3.1% of the population.

There were 5,564 households in the county, of which 23.7% had children under the age of 18 living with them and 28.5% had a female householder with no spouse or partner present. About 35.1% of all households were made up of individuals and 10.5% had someone living alone who was 65 years of age or older.

=== 2010 census ===
As of the 2010 census, there were 13,864 people, 5,110 households, and 2,628 families in the county. The population density was 33.6 inhabitants per square mile (13.0/km^{2}). There were 5,639 housing units at an average density of 13.7 per square mile (5.3/km^{2}). The racial makeup of the county was 91.1% White, 3.1% American Indian, 1.7% Asian, 1.3% black or African American, 0.5% from other races, and 2.3% from two or more races. Those of Hispanic or Latino origin made up 2.0% of the population. In terms of ancestry, 43.9% were German, 16.4% were Norwegian, 15.8% were Irish, 8.7% were English, 5.4% were Swedish, and 1.8% were American.

Of the 5,110 households, 24.7% had children under the age of 18 living with them, 40.9% were married couples living together, 7.3% had a female householder with no husband present, 48.6% were non-families, and 32.4% of all households were made up of individuals. The average household size was 2.28 and the average family size was 2.91. The median age was 25.0 years.

The median income for a household in the county was $37,198 and the median income for a family was $61,159. Males had a median income of $37,059 versus $28,016 for females. The per capita income for the county was $19,518. About 8.0% of families and 24.0% of the population were below the poverty line, including 13.6% of those under age 18 and 6.7% of those age 65 or over.

=== Racial/ethnic makeup ===
The racial makeup of the county was 92.78% White, 1.00% Black or African American, 2.66% Native American, 1.95% Asian, 0.01% Pacific Islander, 0.29% from other races, and 1.31% from two or more races. 0.89% of the population were Hispanic or Latino of any race. 32.0% were of German, 15.6% Norwegian, 9.9% Irish and 5.4% English ancestry.

=== Religion ===
From 2000 Census data, over 50% consider themselves "unclaimed".

- Mainline Protestant with 3,840 is most common around 28%; mainly Lutheran;
- Catholic with 1820 comes second around 13%;
- Evangelical Protestant with 613 would be around 5%; mainly Lutheran Church–Missouri Synod and Southern Baptist.

== Education ==
- University of South Dakota - In 1862 the territorial legislature located the State University in Vermillion, but nothing was done until 1882 when Clay County voted $10,000 in bonds to construct a building on its campus.

School districts include:

- Beresford School District 61-2
- Centerville School District 60-1
- Gayville-Volin School District 63-1
- Irene-Wakonda School District 13-3
- Vermillion School District 13-1
- Viborg Hurley School District 60-6

== Communities ==
=== Cities ===
- Irene (partial)
- Vermillion (county seat)

=== Town ===
- Wakonda

=== Census-designated places ===
- Burbank
- Meckling

=== Unincorporated communities ===
- Alsen (partial)
- Dalesburg
- Greenfield
- Hub City
- Westreville

=== Townships ===
- Bethel
- Fairview
- Garfield
- Glenwood
- Meckling
- Norway
- Pleasant Valley
- Prairie Center
- Riverside
- Spirit Mound
- Star
- Vermillion

== Politics ==
Largely due to the presence of the University of South Dakota, Clay County has consistently voted for Democratic Party candidates for president from 1988 onward, frequently by double digit margins. In 2000, 2016, 2020, and 2024, it was the only county in the Dakotas without a Native American majority to vote Democratic for president.

United States presidential election results for Clay County, South Dakota
Year	Republican		Democratic		Third party(ies)	
Year	No.	%	No.	%	No.	%
1892	918	53.65%	164	9.59%	629	36.76%
1896	1,238	53.36%	1,061	45.73%	21	0.91%
1900	1,387	56.41%	1,037	42.17%	35	1.42%
1904	1,723	77.40%	361	16.22%	142	6.38%
1908	1,291	59.94%	803	37.28%	60	2.79%
1912	0	0.00%	929	41.00%	1,337	59.00%
1916	1,000	44.52%	1,207	53.74%	39	1.74%
1920	1,885	61.88%	907	29.78%	254	8.34%
1924	1,415	42.30%	492	14.71%	1,438	42.99%
1928	2,573	63.42%	1,474	36.33%	10	0.25%
1932	1,514	32.74%	3,040	65.74%	70	1.51%
1936	1,692	33.60%	3,070	60.97%	273	5.42%
1940	2,463	52.08%	2,266	47.92%	0	0.00%
1944	1,970	52.31%	1,796	47.69%	0	0.00%
1948	2,228	51.09%	2,080	47.70%	53	1.22%
1952	3,302	70.05%	1,412	29.95%	0	0.00%
1956	2,632	57.72%	1,928	42.28%	0	0.00%
1960	2,772	59.61%	1,878	40.39%	0	0.00%
1964	1,802	40.95%	2,599	59.05%	0	0.00%
1968	2,249	51.28%	2,006	45.74%	131	2.99%
1972	2,518	47.05%	2,821	52.71%	13	0.24%
1976	2,647	49.93%	2,593	48.92%	61	1.15%
1980	3,004	47.56%	2,271	35.96%	1,041	16.48%
1984	3,057	52.63%	2,711	46.68%	40	0.69%
1988	2,307	44.37%	2,859	54.98%	34	0.65%
1992	1,869	30.96%	2,826	46.82%	1,341	22.22%
1996	2,008	36.04%	2,980	53.48%	584	10.48%
2000	2,363	46.29%	2,638	51.67%	104	2.04%
2004	2,692	43.87%	3,315	54.03%	129	2.10%
2008	2,296	36.78%	3,808	61.01%	138	2.21%
2012	2,147	41.02%	2,955	56.46%	132	2.52%
2016	2,109	41.61%	2,608	51.45%	352	6.94%
2020	2,456	43.10%	3,083	54.11%	159	2.79%
2024	2,574	45.50%	2,944	52.04%	139	2.46%

== See also ==
- National Register of Historic Places listings in Clay County, South Dakota
