= Wakonda, South Dakota =

- Town
- Location in Clay County and the state of South Dakota
- Coordinates: 43°00′29″N 97°06′22″W
- Country: United States
- State: South Dakota
- County: Clay
- Platted: 1888

Area
  - Total: 0.39 sq mi (1.00 km^{2})
  - Land: 0.39 sq mi (1.00 km^{2})
  - Water: 0 sq mi (0.00 km^{2})
- Elevation: 1,388 ft (423 m)

Population (2020)
  - Total: 347
  - Density: 898.8/sq mi (347.03/km^{2})
- Time zone: UTC-6 (Central (CST))
  - Summer (DST): UTC-5 (CDT)
- ZIP code: 57073
- Area code: 605
- FIPS code: 46-68100
- GNIS feature ID: 1267621

Wakonda is an incorporated town in Clay County, South Dakota, United States. The population was 347 at the 2020 census.

== History ==
A post office called Wakonda has been in operation since 1886. Wakonda was platted in 1888. Its name refers to something holy in the Sioux language, and it was chosen by William Henry Harrison Beadle.

== Geography ==
According to the United States Census Bureau, the town has a total area of 0.39 square miles (1.01 km^{2}), all land. Corn and soybeans are grown on the farms surrounding the town. The climate is humid continental, with hot summers and cold winters. Annual precipitation is approximately 25 inches.

== Demographics ==
Historical population
Census	Pop.	Note	%±
1900	220		—
1910	326		48.2%
1920	451		38.3%
1930	453		0.4%
1940	451		−0.4%
1950	454		0.7%
1960	382		−15.9%
1970	290		−24.1%
1980	383		32.1%
1990	329		−14.1%
2000	374		13.7%
2010	321		−14.2%
2020	347		8.1%
U.S. Decennial Census

=== 2010 census ===
At the 2010 census, there were 321 people, 128 households and 72 families residing in the town. The population density was 823.1 per square mile (317.8/km^{2}). There were 163 housing units at an average density of 417.9 per square mile (161.4/km^{2}). The racial make-up of the town was 98.4% White, 0.3% African American and 1.2% from other races. Hispanic or Latino of any race were 1.2% of the population.

There were 128 households, of which 29.7% had children under the age of 18 living with them, 50.8% were married couples living together, 1.6% had a female householder with no husband present, 3.9% had a male householder with no wife present, and 43.8% were non-families. 40.6% of all households were made up of individuals, and 22.6% had someone living alone who was 65 years of age or older. The average household size was 2.20 and the average family size was 3.03.

The median age in the town was 48.9 years. 21.8% of residents were under the age of 18; 3.7% were between the ages of 18 and 24; 20.2% were from 25 to 44; 27.7% were from 45 to 64; and 26.5% were 65 years of age or older. The sex make-up of the town was 49.8% male and 50.2% female.

=== 2000 census ===
At the 2000 census, there were 374 people, 133 households and 90 families residing in the town. The population density was 978.2 per square mile (377.7/km^{2}). There were 156 housing units at an average density of 408.0 per square mile (157.5/km^{2}). The racial make-up of the town was 99.47% White, 0.27% Native American and 0.27% from two or more races.

There were 133 households, of which 39.8% had children under the age of 18 living with them, 55.6% were married couples living together, 8.3% had a female householder with no husband present and 32.3% were non-families. 30.8% of all households were made up of individuals and 17.3% had someone living alone who was 65 years of age or older. The average household size was 2.47 and the average family size was 3.06.

27.3% of the population were under the age of 18, 4.0% from 18 to 24, 25.1% from 25 to 44, 16.8% from 45 to 64 and 26.7% were 65 years of age or older. The median age was 39 years. For every 100 females, there were 92.8 males. For every 100 females age 18 and over, there were 86.3 males.

The median household income was $31,875 and the median family income was $38,750. Males had a median income of $31,458 and females $18,250. The per capita income was $15,685. About 2.3% of families and 4.2% of the population were below the poverty line, including 6.3% of those under age 18 and none of those age 65 or over.

== Education ==
The school district is Irene-Wakonda School District 13-3.
