= 1984 United States presidential election in South Dakota =

- November 6, 1984

Nominee	Ronald Reagan	Walter Mondale
Party	Republican	Democratic
Home state	California	Minnesota
Running mate	George H. W. Bush	Geraldine Ferraro
Electoral vote	3	0
Popular vote	200,267	116,113
Percentage	63.00%	36.53%
County results
Reagan
50–60%
60–70%
70–80%
80–90%
Mondale
50–60%
80–90%
President before election
Ronald Reagan
Republican
Elected President
Ronald Reagan
Republican

The 1984 United States presidential election in South Dakota took place on November 6, 1984. All 50 states and the District of Columbia, were part of the 1984 United States presidential election. Voters chose three electors to the Electoral College, which selected the president and vice president of the United States.

South Dakota was won by incumbent United States President Ronald Reagan of California, who was running against former Vice President Walter Mondale of Minnesota. Reagan ran for a second time with incumbent Vice President and former C.I.A. Director George H. W. Bush of Texas, and Mondale ran with Representative Geraldine Ferraro of New York, the first major female candidate for the vice presidency.

The presidential election of 1984 was a very partisan election for South Dakota, with over 99.5% of the electorate voting for either the Democratic or Republican parties, and only four candidates appearing on the ballot. All but two counties in South Dakota voted in majority for the Republican candidate. This included the typically more Democratic East River counties such as Brown, and Minnehaha (Sioux Falls). Reagan did the best in Haakon County, and Mondale did the best in nearby Shannon County, which gave Mondale his third-best percentage nationwide behind the District of Columbia and Alabama’s Macon County.

South Dakota weighed in for this election as about eight points more Republican than the national average. As of the 2024 presidential election, this is the last election in which Dewey County, Buffalo County, and Clay County voted for a Republican presidential candidate.

Reagan carried South Dakota by 26.5%, the strongest performance of any presidential nominee in the state since 1952. After nearly voting for Carter in 1976, the state trended much more heavily Republican in both of Reagan's elections; it had been one of only nine to give Reagan over 60% of the vote in the three-way election of 1980. South Dakota became much more competitive in the drought-influenced 1988 election, but would go on to re-establish itself as a reliably red state in the 21st century. Even so, Reagan's 63.00% vote share in South Dakota remained unmatched by any subsequent nominee until Donald Trump received a vote share of 63.43% in 2024.

== Results ==
1984 United States presidential election in South Dakota
Party	Candidate	Votes	Percentage	Electoral votes
Republican	Ronald Reagan (incumbent)	200,267	63.00%	3
Democratic	Walter Mondale	116,113	36.53%	0
Independent	Dennis Serrette	1,150	0.36%	0
Independent	Melvin Mason	337	0.11%	0
Totals		317,867	100.0%	3

=== Results by county ===
County	Ronald Reagan Republican		Walter Mondale Democratic		Dennis Serrette Independent		Melvin Mason Independent		Margin		Total votes cast
County	#	%	#	%	#	%	#	%	#	%	Total votes cast
Aurora	1,029	54.65%	840	44.61%	10	0.53%	4	0.21%	189	10.04%	1,883
Beadle	5,876	62.36%	3,523	37.39%	18	0.19%	5	0.05%	2,353	24.97%	9,422
Bennett	856	65.05%	453	34.42%	4	0.30%	3	0.23%	403	30.63%	1,316
Bon Homme	2,478	63.44%	1,408	36.05%	13	0.33%	7	0.18%	1,070	27.39%	3,906
Brookings	6,679	61.76%	4,089	37.81%	37	0.34%	9	0.08%	2,590	23.95%	10,814
Brown	10,541	60.35%	6,852	39.23%	51	0.29%	21	0.12%	3,689	21.12%	17,465
Brule	1,578	61.74%	961	37.60%	13	0.51%	4	0.16%	617	24.14%	2,556
Buffalo	253	51.21%	236	47.77%	3	0.61%	2	0.40%	17	3.44%	494
Butte	2,865	78.13%	784	21.38%	14	0.38%	4	0.11%	2,081	56.75%	3,667
Campbell	1,035	82.47%	214	17.05%	4	0.32%	2	0.16%	821	65.42%	1,255
Charles Mix	2,660	58.29%	1,879	41.18%	14	0.31%	10	0.22%	781	17.11%	4,563
Clark	1,748	64.31%	960	35.32%	7	0.26%	3	0.11%	788	28.99%	2,718
Clay	3,057	52.63%	2,711	46.68%	29	0.50%	11	0.19%	346	5.95%	5,808
Codington	6,108	63.11%	3,528	36.45%	37	0.38%	5	0.05%	2,580	26.66%	9,678
Corson	955	54.48%	792	45.18%	5	0.29%	1	0.06%	163	9.30%	1,753
Custer	2,183	71.27%	858	28.01%	19	0.62%	3	0.10%	1,325	43.26%	3,063
Davison	4,783	59.43%	3,248	40.36%	14	0.17%	3	0.04%	1,535	19.07%	8,048
Day	2,150	52.43%	1,932	47.11%	14	0.34%	5	0.12%	218	5.32%	4,101
Deuel	1,537	61.73%	941	37.79%	11	0.44%	1	0.04%	596	23.94%	2,490
Dewey	941	54.49%	772	44.70%	8	0.46%	6	0.35%	169	9.79%	1,727
Douglas	1,713	76.00%	536	23.78%	5	0.22%	0	0.00%	1,177	52.22%	2,254
Edmunds	1,553	60.43%	1,007	39.18%	9	0.35%	1	0.04%	546	21.25%	2,570
Fall River	2,748	70.37%	1,135	29.07%	16	0.41%	6	0.15%	1,613	41.30%	3,905
Faulk	1,124	65.89%	579	33.94%	3	0.18%	0	0.00%	545	31.95%	1,706
Grant	2,738	62.80%	1,606	36.83%	13	0.30%	3	0.07%	1,132	25.97%	4,360
Gregory	1,777	69.17%	780	30.36%	12	0.47%	0	0.00%	997	38.81%	2,569
Haakon	1,168	82.84%	237	16.81%	4	0.28%	1	0.07%	931	66.03%	1,410
Hamlin	1,782	64.54%	963	34.88%	10	0.36%	6	0.22%	819	29.66%	2,761
Hand	2,030	70.34%	846	29.31%	8	0.28%	2	0.07%	1,184	41.03%	2,886
Hanson	898	58.69%	625	40.85%	6	0.39%	1	0.07%	273	17.84%	1,530
Harding	723	79.28%	186	20.39%	2	0.22%	1	0.11%	537	58.89%	912
Hughes	4,985	70.32%	2,072	29.23%	29	0.41%	3	0.04%	2,913	41.09%	7,089
Hutchinson	3,372	72.92%	1,237	26.75%	8	0.17%	7	0.15%	2,135	46.17%	4,624
Hyde	797	69.43%	350	30.49%	1	0.09%	0	0.00%	447	38.94%	1,148
Jackson	903	70.82%	365	28.63%	6	0.47%	1	0.08%	538	42.19%	1,275
Jerauld	1,012	64.79%	542	34.70%	6	0.38%	2	0.13%	470	30.09%	1,562
Jones	689	76.64%	206	22.91%	3	0.33%	1	0.11%	483	53.73%	899
Kingsbury	2,121	62.70%	1,249	36.92%	12	0.35%	1	0.03%	872	25.78%	3,383
Lake	3,027	55.92%	2,367	43.73%	15	0.28%	4	0.07%	660	12.19%	5,413
Lawrence	5,949	69.42%	2,565	29.93%	39	0.46%	16	0.19%	3,384	39.49%	8,569
Lincoln	3,988	60.10%	2,626	39.57%	19	0.29%	3	0.05%	1,362	20.53%	6,636
Lyman	1,120	69.78%	478	29.78%	6	0.37%	1	0.06%	642	40.00%	1,605
Marshall	1,529	57.72%	1,111	41.94%	5	0.19%	4	0.15%	418	15.78%	2,649
McCook	1,902	56.57%	1,448	43.07%	8	0.24%	4	0.12%	454	13.50%	3,362
McPherson	1,813	81.08%	418	18.69%	5	0.22%	0	0.00%	1,395	62.39%	2,236
Meade	5,908	73.47%	2,093	26.03%	31	0.39%	9	0.11%	3,815	47.44%	8,041
Mellette	616	66.45%	303	32.69%	6	0.65%	2	0.22%	313	33.76%	927
Miner	1,004	50.78%	960	48.56%	8	0.40%	5	0.25%	44	2.22%	1,977
Minnehaha	29,908	56.25%	23,042	43.34%	177	0.33%	44	0.08%	6,866	12.91%	53,171
Moody	1,633	50.59%	1,586	49.13%	7	0.22%	2	0.06%	47	1.46%	3,228
Pennington	21,947	72.22%	8,224	27.06%	186	0.61%	32	0.11%	13,723	45.16%	30,389
Perkins	1,686	69.93%	714	29.61%	11	0.46%	0	0.00%	972	40.32%	2,411
Potter	1,551	76.22%	482	23.69%	2	0.10%	0	0.00%	1,069	52.53%	2,035
Roberts	2,767	57.17%	2,063	42.62%	7	0.14%	3	0.06%	704	14.55%	4,840
Sanborn	1,080	63.72%	611	36.05%	2	0.12%	2	0.12%	469	27.67%	1,695
Shannon	324	17.71%	1,489	81.41%	7	0.38%	9	0.49%	-1,165	-63.70%	1,829
Spink	2,627	60.75%	1,680	38.85%	12	0.28%	5	0.12%	947	21.90%	4,324
Stanley	942	72.52%	351	27.02%	6	0.46%	0	0.00%	591	45.50%	1,299
Sully	836	75.52%	266	24.03%	4	0.36%	1	0.09%	570	51.49%	1,107
Todd	679	39.61%	1,022	59.63%	7	0.41%	6	0.35%	-343	-20.02%	1,714
Tripp	2,483	72.18%	935	27.18%	14	0.41%	8	0.23%	1,548	45.00%	3,440
Turner	3,086	67.20%	1,486	32.36%	14	0.30%	6	0.13%	1,600	34.84%	4,592
Union	2,431	51.98%	2,221	47.49%	20	0.43%	5	0.11%	210	4.49%	4,677
Walworth	2,396	75.02%	779	24.39%	15	0.47%	4	0.13%	1,617	50.63%	3,194
Yankton	5,161	63.36%	2,932	36.00%	37	0.45%	15	0.18%	2,229	27.36%	8,145
Ziebach	429	54.17%	359	45.33%	2	0.25%	2	0.25%	70	8.84%	792
Totals	200,267	63.00%	116,113	36.53%	1,150	0.36%	337	0.11%	84,154	26.47%	317,867

== See also ==
- Presidency of Ronald Reagan
- United States presidential elections in South Dakota
