= 1972 United States presidential election in South Dakota =

- November 7, 1972

Nominee	Richard Nixon	George McGovern
Party	Republican	Democratic
Home state	California	South Dakota
Running mate	Spiro Agnew	Sargent Shriver
Electoral vote	4	0
Popular vote	166,476	139,945
Percentage	54.15%	45.52%
County results
Nixon
40–50%
50–60%
60–70%
70–80%
McGovern
40–50%
50–60%
70–80%
President before election
Richard Nixon
Republican
Elected President
Richard Nixon
Republican

The 1972 United States presidential election in South Dakota took place on November 7, 1972, as part of the 1972 United States presidential election. Voters chose four representatives, or electors, to the Electoral College, who voted for president and vice president.

South Dakota was the home state of George McGovern, the Democratic Party nominee in the 1972 United States presidential election.

McGovern, a member of the liberal wing of his party in a relatively conservative state, was at the time of the election a popular two-term Senator, having won re-election in 1968 with 56.8% of the vote. However, he lost the presidential vote here to incumbent Republican President Richard Nixon. McGovern's loss was heavily influenced by voter opposition to his perceived far-left ideology. Eight years later, McGovern would lose South Dakota again by roughly double the margin he lost to Nixon by. Despite his loss in South Dakota, it was the only state that voted more Democratic in 1972 than it had in 1968. Overall, South Dakota was McGovern's fourth-strongest state after Massachusetts, Rhode Island, and Minnesota.

McGovern's loss of South Dakota made him the second candidate in four years to lose his state of birth (in 1968, Hubert Humphrey also lost South Dakota, where he was born) and residence (also in 1968, Nixon lost New York, where he lived at the time). McGovern remained the last candidate to lose his state of residence until 2000, when Al Gore lost his home state of Tennessee. Mitt Romney would also lose his then-home state of Massachusetts in 2012 to Barack Obama, and Donald Trump would lose his then-home state of New York in 2016, to Hillary Clinton (who also lived in New York).

Bon Homme, Deuel, Davison, Clay, Edmunds, Hanson, McCook, Moody, Sanborn, and Union counties all flipped to McGovern, twice the amount he flipped elsewhere nationwide. South Dakota voted in this election as nearly 15 points more Democratic than the nation at-large, a significant historical anomaly considering that the state normally leans very heavily Republican. In fact, this election marked one of only four times since statehood that South Dakota voted to the left of the nation, (Note: The others being 1896, 1932, and 1988.) and the state is tied with eight others for the longest ongoing Republican streak in presidential elections.

== Results ==
Electoral results
Presidential candidate	Party	Home state	Popular vote		Electoral vote	Running mate		
Presidential candidate	Party	Home state	Count	Percentage	Electoral vote	Vice-presidential candidate	Home state	Electoral vote
Richard Nixon (incumbent)	Republican	California	166,476	54.15%	4	Spiro Agnew (incumbent)	Maryland	4
George McGovern	Democratic	South Dakota	139,945	45.52%	0	Sargent Shriver	Maryland	0
Linda Jenness	Independent (Note: Jenness was the nominee of the Socialist Workers Party, but appeared on the ballot in South Dakota as an independent candidate.)	Georgia	994	0.34%	0	Andrew Pulley	Illinois	0
Total			307,415	100%	538			538
Needed to win					270			270

=== Results by county ===
County	Richard Nixon Republican		George McGovern Democratic		Linda Jenness Independent		Margin		Total votes cast
County	#	%	#	%	#	%	#	%	Total votes cast
Aurora	1,075	45.96%	1,257	53.74%	7	0.30%	-182	-7.78%	2,339
Beadle	5,922	57.81%	4,297	41.95%	25	0.24%	1,625	15.86%	10,244
Bennett	808	62.83%	476	37.01%	2	0.16%	332	25.82%	1,286
Bon Homme	2,116	47.10%	2,368	52.70%	9	0.20%	-252	-5.60%	4,493
Brookings	5,182	52.26%	4,701	47.41%	33	0.33%	481	4.85%	9,916
Brown	8,134	49.44%	8,216	49.94%	101	0.61%	-82	-0.50%	16,451
Brule	1,421	45.88%	1,665	53.76%	11	0.36%	-244	-7.88%	3,097
Buffalo	221	44.47%	275	55.33%	1	0.20%	-54	-10.86%	497
Butte	2,452	68.82%	1,085	30.45%	26	0.73%	1,367	38.37%	3,563
Campbell	1,169	76.06%	361	23.49%	7	0.46%	808	52.57%	1,537
Charles Mix	2,020	42.79%	2,691	57.00%	10	0.21%	-671	-14.21%	4,721
Clark	1,617	54.59%	1,336	45.10%	9	0.30%	281	9.49%	2,962
Clay	2,518	47.05%	2,821	52.71%	13	0.24%	-303	-5.66%	5,352
Codington	4,936	51.61%	4,601	48.11%	27	0.28%	335	3.50%	9,564
Corson	975	58.28%	689	41.18%	9	0.54%	286	17.10%	1,673
Custer	1,476	64.48%	798	34.86%	15	0.66%	678	29.62%	2,289
Davison	3,796	44.50%	4,710	55.21%	25	0.29%	-914	-10.71%	8,531
Day	1,971	41.95%	2,719	57.86%	9	0.19%	-748	-15.91%	4,699
Deuel	1,357	49.60%	1,370	50.07%	9	0.33%	-13	-0.47%	2,736
Dewey	1,008	58.88%	699	40.83%	5	0.29%	309	18.05%	1,712
Douglas	1,434	61.68%	887	38.15%	4	0.17%	547	23.53%	2,325
Edmunds	1,567	48.73%	1,646	51.18%	3	0.09%	-79	-2.45%	3,216
Fall River	2,374	67.89%	1,107	31.66%	16	0.46%	1,267	36.23%	3,497
Faulk	1,004	50.07%	986	49.18%	15	0.75%	18	0.89%	2,005
Grant	2,247	50.04%	2,231	49.69%	12	0.27%	16	0.35%	4,490
Gregory	1,670	51.59%	1,555	48.04%	12	0.37%	115	3.55%	3,237
Haakon	1,021	73.14%	366	26.22%	9	0.64%	655	46.92%	1,396
Hamlin	1,693	56.85%	1,276	42.85%	9	0.30%	417	14.00%	2,978
Hand	1,806	57.90%	1,307	41.90%	6	0.19%	499	16.00%	3,119
Hanson	876	45.96%	1,022	53.62%	8	0.42%	-146	-7.66%	1,906
Harding	637	71.57%	253	28.43%	0	0.00%	384	43.14%	890
Hughes	4,231	67.35%	2,037	32.43%	14	0.22%	2,194	34.92%	6,282
Hutchinson	3,092	57.82%	2,248	42.03%	8	0.15%	844	15.79%	5,348
Hyde	789	59.50%	533	40.20%	4	0.30%	256	19.30%	1,326
Jackson	581	68.68%	261	30.85%	4	0.47%	320	37.83%	846
Jerauld	988	54.29%	829	45.55%	3	0.16%	159	8.74%	1,820
Jones	642	64.39%	346	34.70%	9	0.90%	296	29.69%	997
Kingsbury	2,320	58.62%	1,632	41.23%	6	0.15%	688	17.39%	3,958
Lake	2,919	50.14%	2,886	49.57%	17	0.29%	33	0.57%	5,822
Lawrence	4,795	65.22%	2,533	34.45%	24	0.33%	2,262	30.77%	7,352
Lincoln	3,201	54.92%	2,617	44.90%	10	0.17%	584	10.02%	5,828
Lyman	1,166	59.98%	774	39.81%	4	0.21%	392	20.17%	1,944
Marshall	1,500	47.66%	1,646	52.30%	1	0.03%	-146	-4.64%	3,147
McCook	1,963	49.53%	1,993	50.29%	7	0.18%	-30	-0.76%	3,963
McPherson	1,950	76.92%	579	22.84%	6	0.24%	1,371	54.08%	2,535
Meade	3,416	67.24%	1,633	32.15%	31	0.61%	1,783	35.09%	5,080
Mellette	637	59.20%	433	40.24%	6	0.56%	204	18.96%	1,076
Miner	1,059	44.03%	1,337	55.59%	9	0.37%	-278	-11.56%	2,405
Minnehaha	22,447	49.90%	22,386	49.76%	155	0.34%	61	0.14%	44,988
Moody	1,648	46.37%	1,895	53.32%	11	0.31%	-247	-6.95%	3,554
Pennington	13,654	61.16%	8,592	38.48%	80	0.36%	5,062	22.68%	22,326
Perkins	1,691	65.09%	900	34.64%	7	0.27%	791	30.45%	2,598
Potter	1,389	61.65%	858	38.08%	6	0.27%	531	23.57%	2,253
Roberts	2,187	42.29%	2,976	57.54%	9	0.17%	-789	-15.25%	5,172
Sanborn	1,064	49.60%	1,074	50.07%	7	0.33%	-10	-0.47%	2,145
Shannon	356	22.10%	1,246	77.34%	9	0.56%	-890	-55.24%	1,611
Spink	2,547	52.19%	2,321	47.56%	12	0.25%	226	4.63%	4,880
Stanley	779	60.95%	492	38.50%	7	0.55%	287	22.45%	1,278
Sully	773	64.90%	414	34.76%	4	0.34%	359	30.14%	1,191
Todd	806	46.78%	907	52.64%	10	0.58%	-101	-5.86%	1,723
Tripp	2,592	62.73%	1,538	37.22%	2	0.05%	1,054	25.51%	4,132
Turner	3,007	60.02%	1,993	39.78%	10	0.20%	1,014	20.24%	5,010
Union	2,271	46.90%	2,554	52.75%	17	0.35%	-283	-5.85%	4,842
Walworth	2,416	65.10%	1,287	34.68%	8	0.22%	1,129	30.42%	3,711
Washabaugh	245	53.73%	211	46.27%	0	0.00%	34	7.46%	456
Yankton	4,366	53.08%	3,835	46.63%	24	0.29%	531	6.45%	8,225
Ziebach	486	55.86%	378	43.45%	6	0.69%	108	12.41%	870
Totals	166,476	54.15%	139,945	45.52%	994	0.32%	26,531	8.63%	307,415

== See also ==
- United States presidential elections in South Dakota
