= 1988 United States presidential election in South Dakota =

- November 8, 1988
- Turnout: 71.1% (of registered voters); 61.7% (of voting age population)

| Nominee | George H. W. Bush | Michael Dukakis |
| Party | Republican | Democratic |
| Home state | Texas | Massachusetts |
| Running mate | Dan Quayle | Lloyd Bentsen |
| Electoral vote | 3 | 0 |
| Popular vote | 165,415 | 145,560 |
| Percentage | 52.85% | 46.51% |
County results
Bush
40–50%
50–60%
60–70%
70–80%
Dukakis
40–50%
50–60%
60–70%
80–90%
President before election
Ronald Reagan
Republican
Elected President
George H. W. Bush
Republican

The 1988 United States presidential election in South Dakota took place on November 8, 1988. All 50 states and the District of Columbia, were part of the 1988 United States presidential election. Voters chose three electors to the Electoral College, which selected the president and vice president.

South Dakota was won by incumbent United States Vice President George H. W. Bush of Texas, who was running against Massachusetts Governor Michael Dukakis. Bush ran with Indiana Senator Dan Quayle as Vice President, and Dukakis ran with Texas Senator Lloyd Bentsen.

South Dakota weighed in for this election as 1.5% more Democratic than the national average. This is the last of only four elections since statehood when South Dakota has voted more Democratic than the national average, (Note: The others are 1896 during Bryan's "Cross of Gold" campaign, 1932 during the Dust Bowl, and 1972 when favorite son George McGovern was the Democratic nominee.) an anomaly probably caused by the persistent crisis in the United States' farming sector during the decade.

Bush won the election in South Dakota with a 6-point margin.

The presidential election of 1988 was a very partisan election for South Dakota, with more than 99 percent of the electorate voting for either the Republican or the Democratic parties, and only five candidates appearing on the ballot. While most counties turned out in this election for Bush, the highly populated centers of Brown County and Sioux Falls's Minnehaha County, voted in majority for Dukakis.

== Results ==
1988 United States presidential election in South Dakota
| Party | Candidate | Votes | Percentage | Electoral votes |
|---|---|---|---|---|
| Republican | George H. W. Bush | 165,415 | 52.85% | 3 |
| Democratic | Michael Dukakis | 145,560 | 46.51% | 0 |
| Libertarian | Ron Paul | 1,060 | 0.34% | 0 |
| New Alliance Party | Lenora Fulani | 730 | 0.23% | 0 |
| Socialist Workers Party | James Warren | 226 | 0.07% | 0 |
| Totals | | 312,991 | 100.0% | 3 |

=== Results by county ===
| County | George H. W. Bush Republican | | Michael Dukakis Democratic | | Ron Paul Libertarian | | Lenora Fulani New Alliance | | James Warren Socialist Workers | | Margin | | Total votes cast |
| County | # | % | # | % | # | % | # | % | # | % | # | % | Total votes cast |
|---|---|---|---|---|---|---|---|---|---|---|---|---|---|
| Aurora | 856 | 46.17% | 987 | 53.24% | 5 | 0.27% | 5 | 0.27% | 1 | 0.05% | -131 | -7.07% | 1,854 |
| Beadle | 4,611 | 50.23% | 4,523 | 49.27% | 29 | 0.32% | 15 | 0.16% | 2 | 0.02% | 88 | 0.96% | 9,180 |
| Bennett | 663 | 52.54% | 579 | 45.88% | 18 | 1.43% | 1 | 0.08% | 1 | 0.08% | 84 | 6.66% | 1,262 |
| Bon Homme | 1,826 | 53.44% | 1,574 | 46.06% | 6 | 0.18% | 9 | 0.26% | 2 | 0.06% | 252 | 7.38% | 3,417 |
| Brookings | 5,394 | 52.34% | 4,860 | 47.16% | 20 | 0.19% | 29 | 0.28% | 2 | 0.02% | 534 | 5.18% | 10,305 |
| Brown | 8,537 | 49.34% | 8,673 | 50.13% | 42 | 0.24% | 39 | 0.23% | 11 | 0.06% | -136 | -0.79% | 17,302 |
| Brule | 971 | 49.19% | 991 | 50.20% | 9 | 0.46% | 2 | 0.10% | 1 | 0.05% | -20 | -1.01% | 1,974 |
| Buffalo | 151 | 30.82% | 334 | 68.16% | 2 | 0.41% | 1 | 0.20% | 2 | 0.41% | -183 | -37.34% | 490 |
| Butte | 2,291 | 63.96% | 1,256 | 35.06% | 19 | 0.53% | 15 | 0.42% | 1 | 0.03% | 1,035 | 28.90% | 3,582 |
| Campbell | 909 | 72.60% | 334 | 26.68% | 8 | 0.64% | 1 | 0.08% | 0 | 0.00% | 575 | 45.92% | 1,252 |
| Charles Mix | 1,966 | 46.99% | 2,205 | 52.70% | 5 | 0.12% | 4 | 0.10% | 4 | 0.10% | -239 | -5.71% | 4,184 |
| Clark | 1,247 | 51.44% | 1,164 | 48.02% | 3 | 0.12% | 9 | 0.37% | 1 | 0.04% | 83 | 3.42% | 2,424 |
| Clay | 2,307 | 44.37% | 2,859 | 54.98% | 18 | 0.35% | 7 | 0.13% | 9 | 0.17% | -552 | -10.61% | 5,200 |
| Codington | 5,050 | 51.99% | 4,570 | 47.05% | 34 | 0.35% | 46 | 0.47% | 14 | 0.14% | 480 | 4.94% | 9,714 |
| Corson | 710 | 49.03% | 722 | 49.86% | 11 | 0.76% | 4 | 0.28% | 1 | 0.07% | -12 | -0.83% | 1,448 |
| Custer | 1,806 | 59.49% | 1,180 | 38.87% | 34 | 1.12% | 9 | 0.30% | 7 | 0.23% | 626 | 20.62% | 3,036 |
| Davison | 4,024 | 51.68% | 3,705 | 47.59% | 20 | 0.26% | 30 | 0.39% | 7 | 0.09% | 319 | 4.09% | 7,786 |
| Day | 1,616 | 42.82% | 2,137 | 56.62% | 19 | 0.50% | 2 | 0.05% | 0 | 0.00% | -521 | -13.80% | 3,774 |
| Deuel | 1,251 | 49.49% | 1,246 | 49.29% | 17 | 0.67% | 12 | 0.47% | 2 | 0.08% | 5 | 0.20% | 2,528 |
| Dewey | 765 | 42.76% | 1,007 | 56.29% | 14 | 0.78% | 1 | 0.06% | 2 | 0.11% | -242 | -13.53% | 1,789 |
| Douglas | 1,438 | 67.23% | 695 | 32.49% | 3 | 0.14% | 3 | 0.14% | 0 | 0.00% | 743 | 34.74% | 2,139 |
| Edmunds | 1,327 | 51.06% | 1,259 | 48.44% | 7 | 0.27% | 4 | 0.15% | 2 | 0.08% | 68 | 2.62% | 2,599 |
| Fall River | 2,002 | 58.59% | 1,380 | 40.39% | 25 | 0.73% | 7 | 0.20% | 3 | 0.09% | 622 | 18.20% | 3,417 |
| Faulk | 842 | 53.94% | 714 | 45.74% | 2 | 0.13% | 3 | 0.19% | 0 | 0.00% | 128 | 8.20% | 1,561 |
| Grant | 2,148 | 51.49% | 1,988 | 47.65% | 19 | 0.46% | 15 | 0.36% | 2 | 0.05% | 160 | 3.84% | 4,172 |
| Gregory | 1,566 | 57.53% | 1,138 | 41.81% | 7 | 0.26% | 9 | 0.33% | 2 | 0.07% | 428 | 15.72% | 2,722 |
| Haakon | 958 | 70.91% | 379 | 28.05% | 9 | 0.67% | 5 | 0.37% | 0 | 0.00% | 579 | 42.86% | 1,351 |
| Hamlin | 1,380 | 52.06% | 1,258 | 47.45% | 9 | 0.34% | 4 | 0.15% | 0 | 0.00% | 122 | 4.61% | 2,651 |
| Hand | 1,461 | 56.67% | 1,101 | 42.71% | 8 | 0.31% | 8 | 0.31% | 0 | 0.00% | 360 | 13.96% | 2,578 |
| Hanson | 786 | 50.00% | 776 | 49.36% | 8 | 0.51% | 2 | 0.13% | 0 | 0.00% | 10 | 0.64% | 1,572 |
| Harding | 633 | 70.33% | 259 | 28.78% | 5 | 0.56% | 3 | 0.33% | 0 | 0.00% | 374 | 41.55% | 900 |
| Hughes | 4,545 | 61.07% | 2,853 | 38.34% | 24 | 0.32% | 15 | 0.20% | 5 | 0.07% | 1,692 | 22.73% | 7,442 |
| Hutchinson | 2,700 | 62.56% | 1,594 | 36.93% | 9 | 0.21% | 13 | 0.30% | 0 | 0.00% | 1,106 | 25.63% | 4,316 |
| Hyde | 546 | 53.58% | 436 | 42.79% | 29 | 2.85% | 5 | 0.49% | 3 | 0.29% | 110 | 10.79% | 1,019 |
| Jackson | 671 | 58.81% | 450 | 39.44% | 14 | 1.23% | 2 | 0.18% | 4 | 0.35% | 221 | 19.37% | 1,141 |
| Jerauld | 777 | 50.65% | 751 | 48.96% | 2 | 0.13% | 4 | 0.26% | 0 | 0.00% | 26 | 1.69% | 1,534 |
| Jones | 521 | 66.28% | 261 | 33.21% | 3 | 0.38% | 1 | 0.13% | 0 | 0.00% | 260 | 33.07% | 786 |
| Kingsbury | 1,592 | 51.57% | 1,472 | 47.68% | 11 | 0.36% | 7 | 0.23% | 5 | 0.16% | 120 | 3.89% | 3,087 |
| Lake | 2,439 | 47.62% | 2,663 | 51.99% | 8 | 0.16% | 9 | 0.18% | 3 | 0.06% | -224 | -4.37% | 5,122 |
| Lawrence | 5,570 | 59.39% | 3,705 | 39.50% | 66 | 0.70% | 32 | 0.34% | 6 | 0.06% | 1,865 | 19.89% | 9,379 |
| Lincoln | 3,537 | 52.35% | 3,190 | 47.21% | 15 | 0.22% | 9 | 0.13% | 6 | 0.09% | 347 | 5.14% | 6,757 |
| Lyman | 843 | 56.96% | 631 | 42.64% | 3 | 0.20% | 3 | 0.20% | 0 | 0.00% | 212 | 14.32% | 1,480 |
| Marshall | 1,142 | 45.23% | 1,372 | 54.34% | 7 | 0.28% | 4 | 0.16% | 0 | 0.00% | -230 | -9.11% | 2,525 |
| McCook | 1,501 | 50.00% | 1,492 | 49.70% | 1 | 0.03% | 6 | 0.20% | 2 | 0.07% | 9 | 0.30% | 3,002 |
| McPherson | 1,358 | 70.14% | 571 | 29.49% | 4 | 0.21% | 2 | 0.10% | 1 | 0.05% | 787 | 40.65% | 1,936 |
| Meade | 5,189 | 61.24% | 3,212 | 37.91% | 43 | 0.51% | 27 | 0.32% | 2 | 0.02% | 1,977 | 23.33% | 8,473 |
| Mellette | 460 | 53.99% | 385 | 45.19% | 6 | 0.70% | 1 | 0.12% | 0 | 0.00% | 75 | 8.80% | 852 |
| Miner | 795 | 45.30% | 955 | 54.42% | 4 | 0.23% | 1 | 0.06% | 0 | 0.00% | -160 | -9.12% | 1,755 |
| Minnehaha | 26,765 | 47.71% | 29,135 | 51.94% | 82 | 0.15% | 84 | 0.15% | 29 | 0.05% | -2,370 | -4.23% | 56,095 |
| Moody | 1,161 | 40.19% | 1,715 | 59.36% | 4 | 0.14% | 7 | 0.24% | 2 | 0.07% | -554 | -19.17% | 2,889 |
| Pennington | 19,510 | 61.44% | 12,068 | 38.00% | 90 | 0.28% | 71 | 0.22% | 18 | 0.06% | 7,442 | 23.44% | 31,757 |
| Perkins | 1,326 | 60.36% | 851 | 38.73% | 17 | 0.77% | 3 | 0.14% | 0 | 0.00% | 475 | 21.63% | 2,197 |
| Potter | 1,175 | 62.07% | 701 | 37.03% | 10 | 0.53% | 5 | 0.26% | 2 | 0.11% | 474 | 25.04% | 1,893 |
| Roberts | 2,012 | 46.67% | 2,267 | 52.59% | 20 | 0.46% | 6 | 0.14% | 6 | 0.14% | -255 | -5.92% | 4,311 |
| Sanborn | 815 | 51.10% | 770 | 48.28% | 4 | 0.25% | 6 | 0.38% | 0 | 0.00% | 45 | 2.82% | 1,595 |
| Shannon | 256 | 17.31% | 1,206 | 81.54% | 7 | 0.47% | 4 | 0.27% | 6 | 0.41% | -950 | -64.23% | 1,479 |
| Spink | 1,969 | 48.47% | 2,071 | 50.98% | 9 | 0.22% | 8 | 0.20% | 5 | 0.12% | -102 | -2.51% | 4,062 |
| Stanley | 698 | 57.26% | 511 | 41.92% | 8 | 0.66% | 2 | 0.16% | 0 | 0.00% | 187 | 15.34% | 1,219 |
| Sully | 571 | 56.76% | 393 | 39.07% | 41 | 4.08% | 1 | 0.10% | 0 | 0.00% | 178 | 17.69% | 1,006 |
| Todd | 535 | 31.92% | 1,117 | 66.65% | 5 | 0.30% | 9 | 0.54% | 10 | 0.60% | -582 | -34.73% | 1,676 |
| Tripp | 2,113 | 62.96% | 1,219 | 36.32% | 13 | 0.39% | 6 | 0.18% | 5 | 0.15% | 894 | 26.64% | 3,356 |
| Turner | 2,436 | 57.47% | 1,780 | 41.99% | 11 | 0.26% | 8 | 0.19% | 4 | 0.09% | 656 | 15.48% | 4,239 |
| Union | 1,907 | 41.91% | 2,612 | 57.41% | 11 | 0.24% | 14 | 0.31% | 6 | 0.13% | -705 | -15.50% | 4,550 |
| Walworth | 1,940 | 63.40% | 1,094 | 35.75% | 15 | 0.49% | 9 | 0.29% | 2 | 0.07% | 846 | 27.65% | 3,060 |
| Yankton | 4,186 | 52.05% | 3,777 | 46.96% | 26 | 0.32% | 41 | 0.51% | 13 | 0.16% | 409 | 5.09% | 8,043 |
| Ziebach | 362 | 45.53% | 427 | 53.71% | 3 | 0.38% | 2 | 0.25% | 1 | 0.13% | -65 | -8.18% | 795 |
| Totals | 165,415 | 52.85% | 145,560 | 46.51% | 1,060 | 0.34% | 730 | 0.23% | 226 | 0.07% | 19,855 | 6.34% | 312,991 |

==== Counties that flipped from Republican to Democratic ====
- Aurora
- Brown
- Brule
- Buffalo
- Charles Mix
- Clay
- Corson
- Day
- Dewey
- Lake
- Marshall
- Miner
- Minnehaha
- Moody
- Roberts
- Spink
- Ziebach
- Union

== See also ==
- Presidency of George H. W. Bush
- United States presidential elections in South Dakota
