= Cuthbert, South Dakota =

Unincorporated community in South Dakota, U.S.

Coordinates: 43°58′04″N 98°13′26″W

Cuthbert is an unincorporated community in Sanborn County, in the U.S. state of South Dakota.

== History ==
A post office called Cuthbert was established in 1908, and remained in operation until 1954. An early variant name was Espe.
