= Hyde County, South Dakota =

County in South Dakota, United States

- County
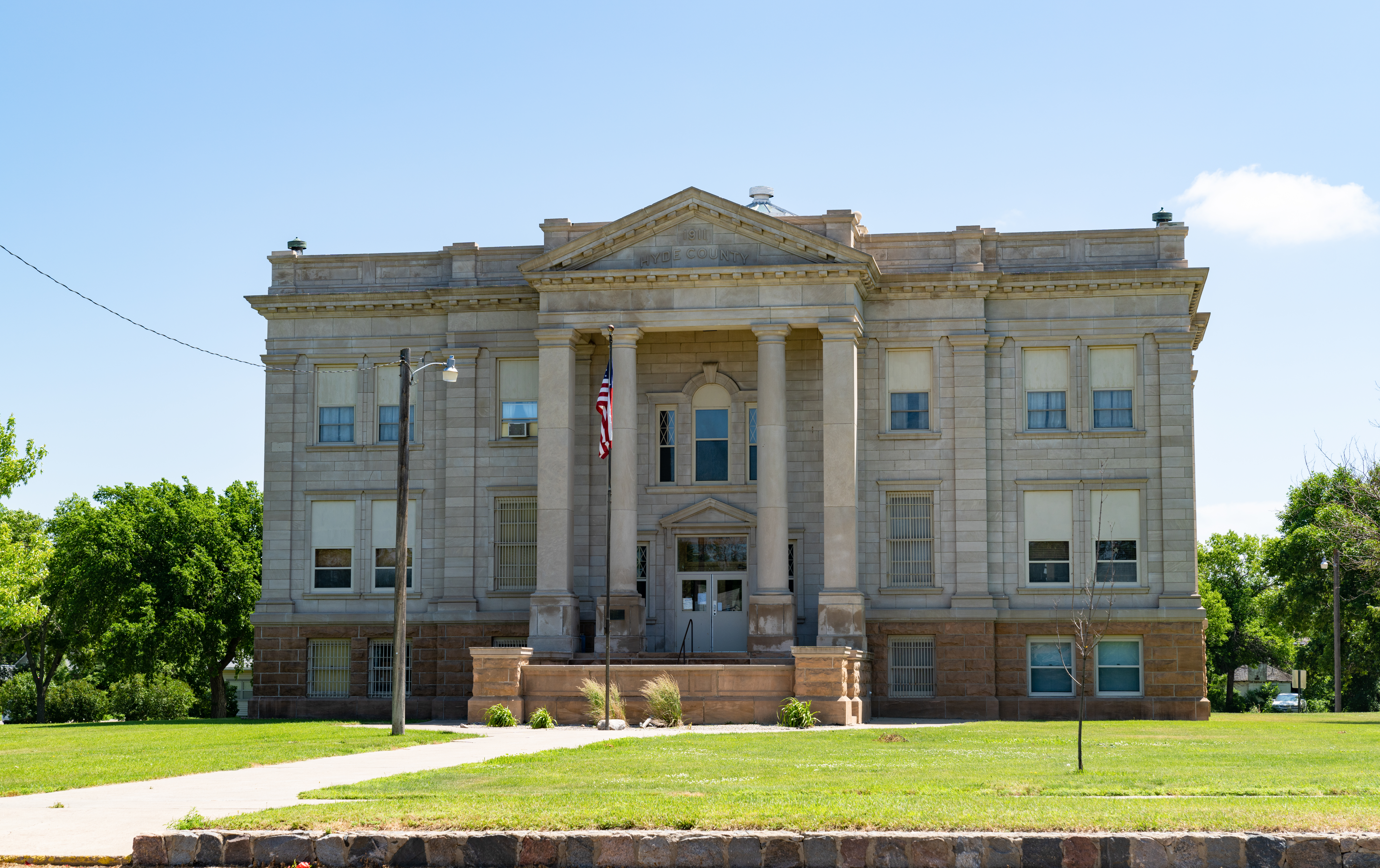
- Hyde County Courthouse in Highmore

- Location within the U.S. state of South Dakota
- Coordinates: 44°32′13.826″N 99°28′21.849″W
- Country: United States
- State: South Dakota
- Founded: 1883
- Named for: James Hyde
- Seat: Highmore
- Largest city: Highmore

Area
  - Total: 866 sq mi (2,240 km^{2})
  - Land: 861 sq mi (2,230 km^{2})
  - Water: 5.6 sq mi (15 km^{2}) 0.6%

Population (2020)
  - Total: 1,262
  - Estimate (2025): 1,191 ▼
  - Density: 1.47/sq mi (0.566/km^{2})
- Time zone: UTC−6 (Central)
  - Summer (DST): UTC−5 (CDT)
- Congressional district: At-large
- Website: hydeco.org

Hyde County is a county in the U.S. state of South Dakota. As of the 2020 census, the population was 1,262, making it the second-least populous county in South Dakota. Its county seat is Highmore. The county was founded in 1873, as a county of the Dakota Territory, and organized in 1883. It was named for James Hyde, a member of legislature in the 1870s.

== History ==
Hyde County was created by the territorial legislature on January 8, 1873, with area partitioned from Buffalo County. It was not organized by that action. Its boundaries were altered by changes in October 1879 and February 1883. On November 5, 1883, the county organization was filled and the county was placed in independent operation.

The current Hyde County courthouse was constructed in 1911 (it is currently listed on the National Register of Historic Places). The county organization included a jail until 1974, when the jail was abandoned and jail-related services were contracted to surrounding counties.

== Geography ==
The county terrain consists of semi-arid rolling hills, partly devoted to agriculture. The Missouri River flows southeastward at its SW corner, and delineates a portion of the county's south boundary line.

The terrain slopes toward the county's SW corner. Its highest point is on the lower part of its eastern boundary line, at 2,080 ft (630 m) ASL.

Hyde County has a total area of 866 square miles (2,240 km^{2}), of which 861 square miles (2,230 km^{2}) is land and 5.6 square miles (15 km^{2}) (0.6%) is water.

=== Major highways ===
- U.S. Highway 14
- South Dakota Highway 26
- South Dakota Highway 34
- South Dakota Highway 47

=== Adjacent counties ===
- Faulk County – north
- Hand County – east
- Buffalo County – south
- Lyman County – southwest
- Hughes County – southwest
- Sully County – west
- Potter County – northwest

=== Protected areas ===
- Chapelle State Game Production Area
- Highmore State Game Production Area
- Rezac Lake State Game Production Area
- Rice Lake State Game Production Area

=== Lakes ===
- Baloun Lake
- Chapelle Lake
- Lake Boehm
- Rezac Lake
- Rice Lake
- Thomas Lake

== Demographics ==
Historical population
| Census | Pop. | Note | %± |
|---|---|---|---|
| 1890 | 1,860 | | — |
| 1900 | 1,492 | | −19.8% |
| 1910 | 3,307 | | 121.6% |
| 1920 | 3,315 | | 0.2% |
| 1930 | 3,690 | | 11.3% |
| 1940 | 3,113 | | −15.6% |
| 1950 | 2,811 | | −9.7% |
| 1960 | 2,602 | | −7.4% |
| 1970 | 2,515 | | −3.3% |
| 1980 | 2,069 | | −17.7% |
| 1990 | 1,696 | | −18.0% |
| 2000 | 1,671 | | −1.5% |
| 2010 | 1,420 | | −15.0% |
| 2020 | 1,262 | | −11.1% |
| 2025 (est.) | 1,191 | ▼ | −5.6% |
U.S. Decennial Census; 1790–1960 1900–1990; 1990–2000 2010–2020

=== 2020 census ===
As of the 2020 census, there were 1,262 people, 522 households, and 355 families residing in the county. The population density was 1.5 inhabitants per square mile (0.58/km^{2}).

Of the residents, 21.7% were under the age of 18 and 25.8% were 65 years of age or older; the median age was 45.5 years. For every 100 females there were 103.5 males, and for every 100 females age 18 and over there were 102.5 males.

The racial makeup of the county was 86.5% White, 0.3% Black or African American, 8.2% American Indian and Alaska Native, 0.4% Asian, 0.6% from some other race, and 4.0% from two or more races. Hispanic or Latino residents of any race comprised 1.9% of the population.

There were 522 households in the county, of which 31.4% had children under the age of 18 living with them and 19.9% had a female householder with no spouse or partner present. About 28.6% of all households were made up of individuals and 12.7% had someone living alone who was 65 years of age or older.

There were 626 housing units, of which 16.6% were vacant. Among occupied housing units, 78.0% were owner-occupied and 22.0% were renter-occupied. The homeowner vacancy rate was 1.7% and the rental vacancy rate was 15.2%.

=== 2010 census ===
As of the 2010 census, there were 1,420 people, 600 households, and 385 families in the county. The population density was 1.7 inhabitants per square mile (0.66/km^{2}). There were 708 housing units at an average density of 0.8 units per square mile (0.31 units/km^{2}). The racial makeup of the county was 89.1% white, 8.5% American Indian, 0.2% Asian, 0.1% Pacific islander, 0.1% black or African American, 0.2% from other races, and 1.9% from two or more races. Those of Hispanic or Latino origin made up 1.1% of the population. In terms of ancestry,

Of the 600 households, 26.2% had children under the age of 18 living with them, 53.7% were married couples living together, 5.5% had a female householder with no husband present, 35.8% were non-families, and 33.0% of all households were made up of individuals. The average household size was 2.30 and the average family size was 2.92. The median age was 46.4 years.

The median income for a household in the county was $41,196 and the median income for a family was $61,161. Males had a median income of $36,053 versus $28,456 for females. The per capita income for the county was $22,995. About 8.3% of families and 11.2% of the population were below the poverty line, including 11.6% of those under age 18 and 14.1% of those age 65 or over.

== Communities ==
=== City ===
- Highmore (county seat)

=== Census-designated place ===
- Stephan

=== Townships ===
- Banner
- Bramhall
- Dewey
- Douglas
- Eden
- Franklin
- Holabird
- Highmore
- Illinois
- Lincoln
- Loomis
- Spring Lake
- Union
- Valley
- William Hamilton

=== Unorganized territories ===
- Central Hyde
- Crow Creek
- North Hyde

== Politics ==
Hyde County voters have been reliably Republican ever since South Dakota's statehood. In only two national elections – the Democratic landslides of Franklin D. Roosevelt in 1932 and Lyndon B. Johnson in 1964 – has the county ever voted for a Democratic presidential candidate – although in the Republican landslides of 1956 (due to a major drought and resultant agricultural problems) and 1972 (due to a strong “favorite son” vote for George McGovern) the county actually voted about 4 points more Democratic than the nation at-large.

United States presidential election results for Hyde County, South Dakota
| Year | Republican | | Democratic | | Third party(ies) | |
| Year | No. | % | No. | % | No. | % |
|---|---|---|---|---|---|---|
| 1892 | 184 | 56.44% | 51 | 15.64% | 91 | 27.91% |
| 1896 | 223 | 64.45% | 121 | 34.97% | 2 | 0.58% |
| 1900 | 286 | 69.76% | 115 | 28.05% | 9 | 2.20% |
| 1904 | 443 | 76.91% | 91 | 15.80% | 42 | 7.29% |
| 1908 | 455 | 64.45% | 212 | 30.03% | 39 | 5.52% |
| 1912 | 0 | 0.00% | 232 | 33.14% | 468 | 66.86% |
| 1916 | 438 | 55.58% | 305 | 38.71% | 45 | 5.71% |
| 1920 | 710 | 68.53% | 233 | 22.49% | 93 | 8.98% |
| 1924 | 669 | 50.53% | 257 | 19.41% | 398 | 30.06% |
| 1928 | 961 | 60.82% | 608 | 38.48% | 11 | 0.70% |
| 1932 | 678 | 42.48% | 895 | 56.08% | 23 | 1.44% |
| 1936 | 795 | 52.51% | 683 | 45.11% | 36 | 2.38% |
| 1940 | 1,018 | 60.31% | 670 | 39.69% | 0 | 0.00% |
| 1944 | 842 | 64.97% | 454 | 35.03% | 0 | 0.00% |
| 1948 | 817 | 59.25% | 553 | 40.10% | 9 | 0.65% |
| 1952 | 1,051 | 72.78% | 393 | 27.22% | 0 | 0.00% |
| 1956 | 755 | 55.84% | 597 | 44.16% | 0 | 0.00% |
| 1960 | 773 | 53.94% | 660 | 46.06% | 0 | 0.00% |
| 1964 | 666 | 47.50% | 736 | 52.50% | 0 | 0.00% |
| 1968 | 713 | 53.81% | 499 | 37.66% | 113 | 8.53% |
| 1972 | 789 | 59.50% | 533 | 40.20% | 4 | 0.30% |
| 1976 | 687 | 54.39% | 572 | 45.29% | 4 | 0.32% |
| 1980 | 864 | 70.76% | 273 | 22.36% | 84 | 6.88% |
| 1984 | 797 | 69.43% | 350 | 30.49% | 1 | 0.09% |
| 1988 | 546 | 53.58% | 436 | 42.79% | 37 | 3.63% |
| 1992 | 440 | 46.07% | 301 | 31.52% | 214 | 22.41% |
| 1996 | 493 | 54.54% | 309 | 34.18% | 102 | 11.28% |
| 2000 | 592 | 70.90% | 218 | 26.11% | 25 | 2.99% |
| 2004 | 631 | 70.11% | 259 | 28.78% | 10 | 1.11% |
| 2008 | 547 | 69.68% | 226 | 28.79% | 12 | 1.53% |
| 2012 | 531 | 72.44% | 189 | 25.78% | 13 | 1.77% |
| 2016 | 543 | 78.70% | 125 | 18.12% | 22 | 3.19% |
| 2020 | 564 | 79.44% | 136 | 19.15% | 10 | 1.41% |
| 2024 | 530 | 76.26% | 148 | 21.29% | 17 | 2.45% |

== See also ==
- National Register of Historic Places listings in Hyde County, South Dakota
