= Sanborn County, South Dakota =

County in South Dakota, United States

- County
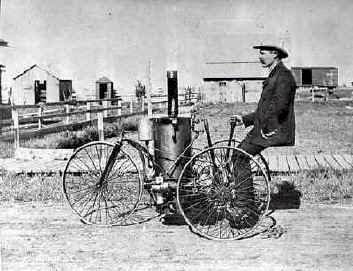
- Steam-powered automobile by E.S. Callihan in Woonsocket (1884)

- Location within the U.S. state of South Dakota
- Coordinates: 44°02′N 98°05′W
- Country: United States
- State: South Dakota
- Founded: 1883
- Named for: George W. Sanborn
- Seat: Woonsocket
- Largest city: Woonsocket

Area
  - Total: 570 sq mi (1,500 km^{2})
  - Land: 569 sq mi (1,470 km^{2})
  - Water: 1.2 sq mi (3.1 km^{2}) 0.2%

Population (2020)
  - Total: 2,330
  - Estimate (2025): 2,388 ▲
  - Density: 4.2/sq mi (1.6/km^{2})
- Time zone: UTC−6 (Central)
  - Summer (DST): UTC−5 (CDT)
- Congressional district: At-large

Sanborn County is a county in the U.S. state of South Dakota. As of the 2020 census, the population was 2,330. Its county seat and largest city is Woonsocket. The county was created by the Dakota Territorial legislature on May 1, 1883, with land partitioned from Miner County. It was fully organized by July 18, 1883.

== Geography ==
The terrain of Sanborn County consists of rolling hills, largely devoted to agriculture. The James River flows southward through the east-central part of the county, and the SW part of the country is drained by Dry Run Creek. The terrain slopes to the south and to the southeast; its highest point is in its SW corner, at 1,358 ft (414 m) ASL. The county has a total area of 570 square miles (1,500 km^{2}), of which 569 square miles (1,470 km^{2}) is land and 1.2 square miles (3.1 km^{2}) (0.2%) is water.

=== Major highways ===
- South Dakota Highway 34
- South Dakota Highway 37
- South Dakota Highway 224

=== Adjacent counties ===
- Beadle County – north
- Kingsbury County – northeast
- Miner County – east
- Hanson County – southeast
- Davison County – south
- Aurora County – southwest
- Jerauld County – west

=== Protected areas ===
- McCoy Lake State Public Shooting Area

=== Lakes and reservoirs ===
- Long Lake
- Twin Lakes (partial)

== Demographics ==
Historical population
Census	Pop.	Note	%±
1890	4,610		—
1900	4,464		−3.2%
1910	6,607		48.0%
1920	7,877		19.2%
1930	7,326		−7.0%
1940	5,754		−21.5%
1950	5,142		−10.6%
1960	4,641		−9.7%
1970	3,697		−20.3%
1980	3,213		−13.1%
1990	2,833		−11.8%
2000	2,675		−5.6%
2010	2,355		−12.0%
2020	2,330		−1.1%
2025 (est.)	2,388	▲	2.5%
U.S. Decennial Census:

=== 2020 census ===
As of the 2020 census, there were 2,330 people, 936 households, and 630 families residing in the county. The population density was 4.1 inhabitants per square mile (1.6/km^{2}). Of the residents, 24.2% were under the age of 18 and 20.9% were 65 years of age or older; the median age was 40.5 years. For every 100 females there were 107.9 males, and for every 100 females age 18 and over there were 108.6 males.

The racial makeup of the county was 93.8% White, 0.1% Black or African American, 1.1% American Indian and Alaska Native, 0.4% Asian, 0.4% from some other race, and 4.2% from two or more races. Hispanic or Latino residents of any race comprised 2.4% of the population.

There were 936 households in the county, of which 31.4% had children under the age of 18 living with them and 16.8% had a female householder with no spouse or partner present. About 28.7% of all households were made up of individuals and 13.1% had someone living alone who was 65 years of age or older.

There were 1,134 housing units, of which 17.5% were vacant. Among occupied housing units, 78.2% were owner-occupied and 21.8% were renter-occupied. The homeowner vacancy rate was 1.6% and the rental vacancy rate was 6.8%.

=== 2010 census ===
As of the 2010 census, there were 2,355 people, 975 households, and 630 families in the county. The population density was 4.1 inhabitants per square mile (1.6/km^{2}). There were 1,172 housing units at an average density of 2.1 units per square mile (0.81 units/km^{2}). The racial makeup of the county was 98.0% white, 0.3% American Indian, 0.2% Asian, 0.6% from other races, and 1.1% from two or more races. Those of Hispanic or Latino origin made up 1.2% of the population. In terms of ancestry.

Of the 975 households, 24.2% had children under the age of 18 living with them, 55.0% were married couples living together, 6.3% had a female householder with no husband present, 35.4% were non-families, and 31.1% of all households were made up of individuals. The average household size was 2.24 and the average family size was 2.79. The median age was 47.1 years.

The median income for a household in the county was $44,732 and the median income for a family was $56,304. Males had a median income of $32,361 versus $23,724 for females. The per capita income for the county was $21,055. About 7.7% of families and 12.7% of the population were below the poverty line, including 21.4% of those under age 18 and 15.1% of those age 65 or over.

== Communities ==
=== City ===
- Woonsocket (county seat)

=== Towns ===
- Artesian
- Letcher

=== Census-designated place ===
- Forestburg
- Upland Colony

=== Unincorporated community ===
- Cuthbert

=== Townships ===
- Afton
- Benedict
- Butler
- Diana
- Elliott
- Floyd
- Jackson
- Letcher
- Logan
- Oneida
- Ravenna
- Silver Creek
- Twin Lake
- Union
- Warren
- Woonsocket

== Politics ==
Sanborn County has been a swing county in the past, but in recent decades has tended to vote Republican. In 64% of the national elections since 1960, the county selected the Republican Party candidate (as of 2020).

United States presidential election results for Sanborn County, South Dakota
Year	Republican		Democratic		Third party(ies)	
Year	No.	%	No.	%	No.	%
1892	564	55.62%	95	9.37%	355	35.01%
1896	530	50.72%	500	47.85%	15	1.44%
1900	628	51.56%	549	45.07%	41	3.37%
1904	1,013	74.05%	265	19.37%	90	6.58%
1908	847	57.70%	513	34.95%	108	7.36%
1912	0	0.00%	577	37.13%	977	62.87%
1916	711	42.00%	898	53.04%	84	4.96%
1920	1,125	49.89%	517	22.93%	613	27.18%
1924	1,184	47.34%	327	13.07%	990	39.58%
1928	1,576	54.08%	1,321	45.33%	17	0.58%
1932	860	26.21%	2,398	73.09%	23	0.70%
1936	1,174	36.64%	1,919	59.89%	111	3.46%
1940	1,732	55.34%	1,398	44.66%	0	0.00%
1944	1,212	54.84%	998	45.16%	0	0.00%
1948	990	48.03%	1,046	50.75%	25	1.21%
1952	1,761	66.05%	905	33.95%	0	0.00%
1956	1,327	50.48%	1,302	49.52%	0	0.00%
1960	1,254	50.10%	1,249	49.90%	0	0.00%
1964	912	39.43%	1,401	60.57%	0	0.00%
1968	1,024	49.71%	956	46.41%	80	3.88%
1972	1,064	49.60%	1,074	50.07%	7	0.33%
1976	881	46.08%	1,025	53.61%	6	0.31%
1980	1,178	60.97%	628	32.51%	126	6.52%
1984	1,080	63.72%	611	36.05%	4	0.24%
1988	815	51.10%	770	48.28%	10	0.63%
1992	595	36.96%	632	39.25%	383	23.79%
1996	630	43.81%	647	44.99%	161	11.20%
2000	767	60.49%	468	36.91%	33	2.60%
2004	817	57.29%	581	40.74%	28	1.96%
2008	669	55.43%	500	41.43%	38	3.15%
2012	688	61.70%	389	34.89%	38	3.41%
2016	819	72.93%	241	21.46%	63	5.61%
2020	905	76.37%	257	21.69%	23	1.94%
2024	929	76.65%	259	21.37%	24	1.98%

== Education ==
School districts include:

- Huron School District 02-2
- Mount Vernon School District 17-3
- Sanborn Central School District
- Wessington Springs School District 36-2
- Woonsocket School District 55-4

== See also ==
- National Register of Historic Places listings in Sanborn County, South Dakota
