= 1892 United States presidential election in South Dakota =

- November 8, 1892
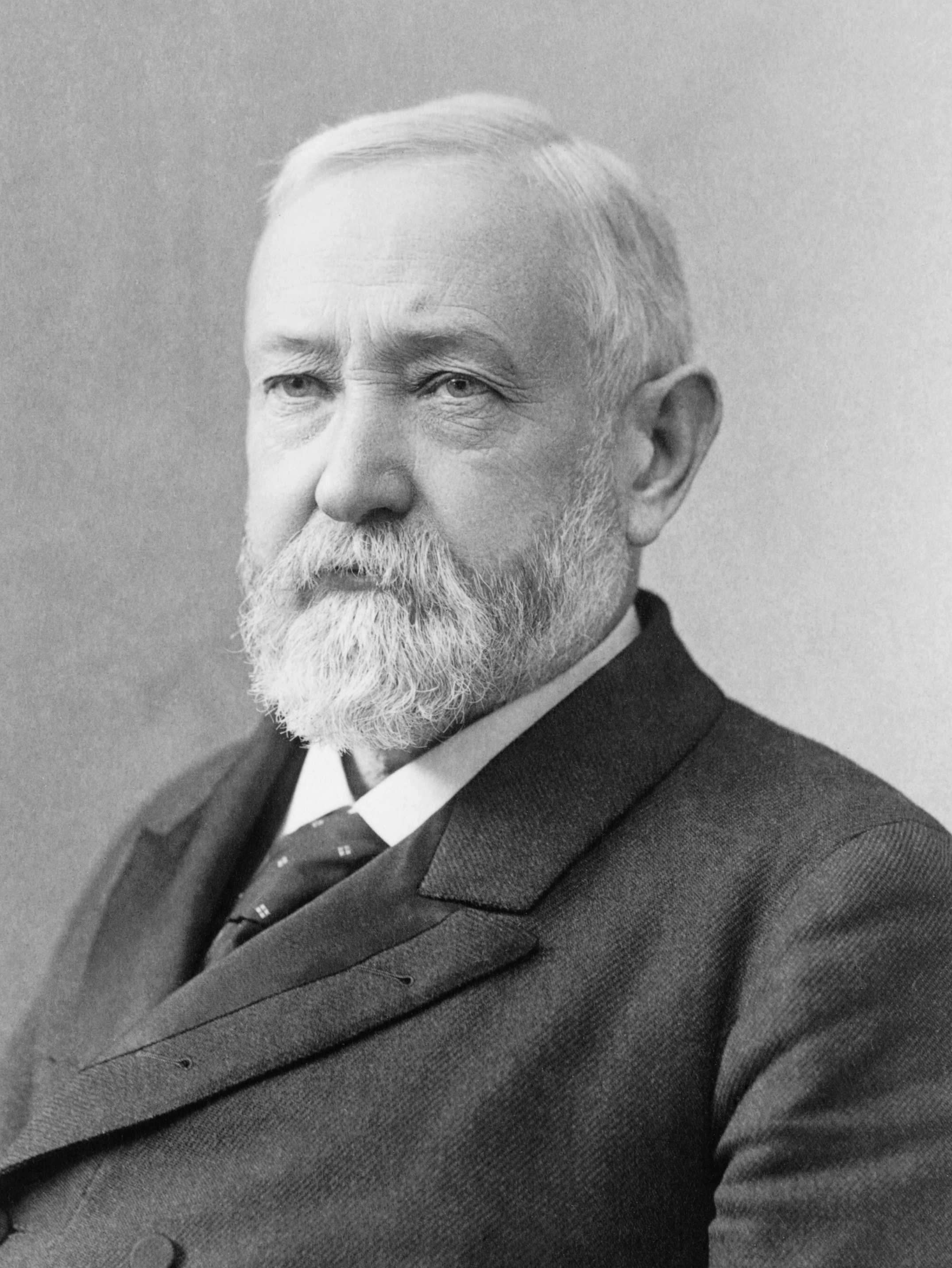

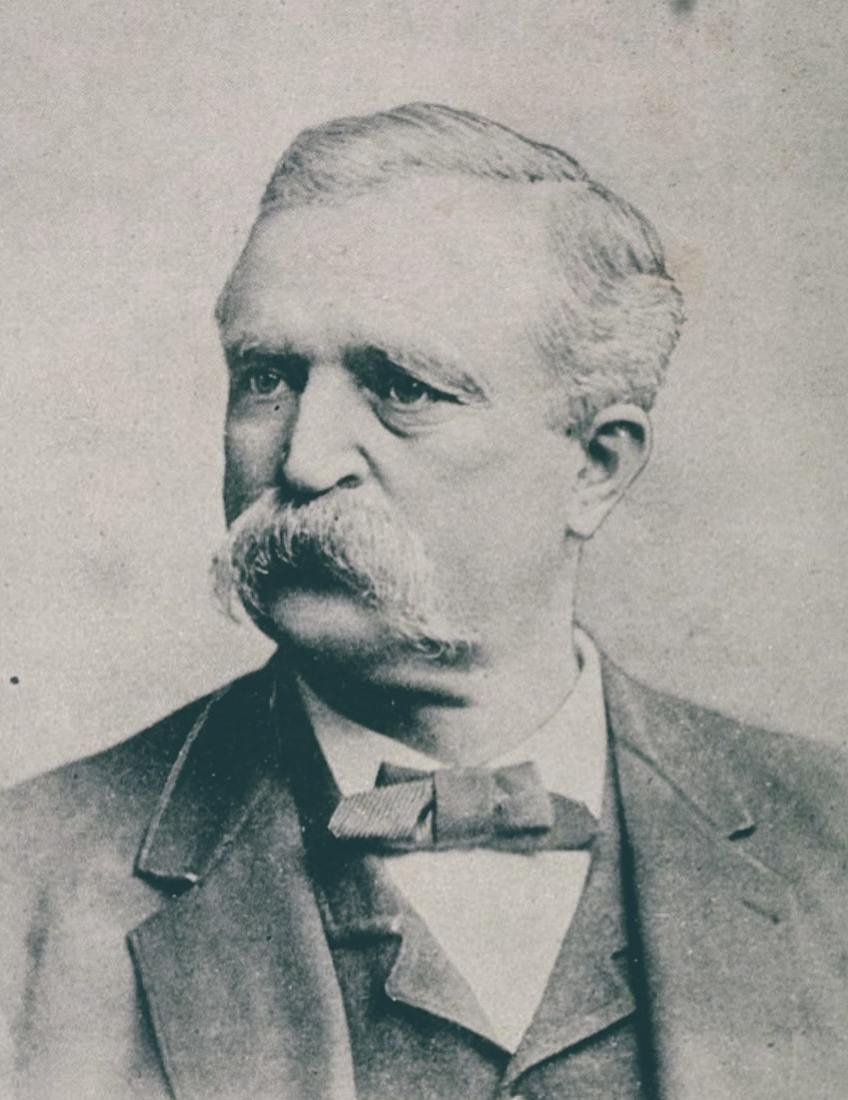

Nominee	Benjamin Harrison	James B. Weaver	Grover Cleveland
Party	Republican	Independent	Democratic
Alliance		Populist
Home state	Indiana	Iowa	New York
Running mate	Whitelaw Reid	James G. Field	Adlai Stevenson I
Electoral vote	4	0	0
Popular vote	34,888	26,544	9,081
Percentage	49.48%	37.64%	12.88%
County results
Harrison
30–40%
40–50%
50–60%
60–70%
Weaver
40–50%
50–60%
President before election
Benjamin Harrison
Republican
Elected President
Grover Cleveland
Democratic

The 1892 United States presidential election in South Dakota took place on November 8, 1892. All contemporary 44 states were part of the 1892 United States presidential election. Voters chose four electors to the Electoral College, which selected the president and vice president. South Dakota participated in its first ever presidential election, having been admitted as the 40th state on November 2, 1889.

The state was won by the Republican ticket of incumbent President Benjamin Harrison of Indiana and his running mate Whitelaw Reid of New York, by a margin of 11.84%. He defeated independent James B. Weaver of Iowa and his running mate James G. Field of Virginia (both of whom ran under the Populist banner nationally), and the Democratic ticket of former (and future) President Grover Cleveland of New York and his running mate Adlai Stevenson I of Illinois.

== Results ==
1892 United States presidential election in South Dakota
Party	Candidate	Votes	Percentage	Electoral votes
Republican	Benjamin Harrison (incumbent)	34,888	49.48%	4
Independent	James B. Weaver	26,544	37.64%	0
Democratic	Grover Cleveland	9,081	12.88%	0
Totals		70,513	100.00%	4
Voter turnout				—

=== Results by county ===
County	Benjamin Harrison Republican		Grover Cleveland Democratic		James B. Weaver Independent		Margin (Note: Because Weaver finished second behind Harrison and ahead of Cleveland in South Dakota as a whole, all margins given are Harrison vote minus Weaver vote and percentage margins Harrison percentage minus Weaver percentage unless otherwise stated for the county in question.)		Total votes cast
County	#	%	#	%	#	%	#	%	Total votes cast
Aurora	461	46.95%	207	21.08%	314	31.98%	147	14.97%	982
Beadle	984	52.85%	206	11.06%	672	36.09%	312	16.76%	1,862
Bon Homme	879	49.52%	260	14.65%	636	35.83%	243	13.69%	1,775
Brookings	1,082	51.57%	189	9.01%	827	39.42%	255	12.15%	2,098
Brown	1,446	45.33%	279	8.75%	1,465	45.92%	-19	-0.60%	3,190
Brule	538	44.03%	200	16.37%	484	39.61%	54	4.42%	1,222
Buffalo	78	50.65%	13	8.44%	63	40.91%	15	9.74%	154
Butte	154	40.10%	28	7.29%	202	52.60%	-48	-12.50%	384
Campbell	390	58.12%	77	11.48%	204	30.40%	186	27.72%	671
Charles Mix	516	57.40%	115	12.79%	268	29.81%	248	27.59%	899
Clark	731	47.19%	197	12.72%	621	40.09%	110	7.10%	1,549
Clay	918	53.65%	164	9.59%	629	36.76%	289	16.89%	1,711
Codington	882	52.16%	408	24.13%	401	23.71%	474 (Note: In this county where Cleveland did finish second ahead of Weaver, margin given is Harrison vote minus Cleveland vote and percentage margin Harrison percentage minus Cleveland percentage.)	28.03%	1,691
Custer	503	49.27%	166	16.26%	352	34.48%	151	14.79%	1,021
Davison	569	42.81%	120	9.03%	640	48.16%	-71	-5.34%	1,329
Day	752	38.92%	362	18.74%	818	42.34%	-66	-3.42%	1,932
Deuel	441	43.79%	126	12.51%	440	43.69%	1	0.10%	1,007
Douglas	541	50.85%	109	10.24%	414	38.91%	127	11.94%	1,064
Edmunds	386	44.22%	156	17.87%	331	37.92%	55	6.30%	873
Fall River	569	53.73%	262	24.74%	228	21.53%	307	28.99%	1,059
Faulk	473	63.75%	107	14.42%	162	21.83%	311	41.91%	742
Grant	605	40.74%	188	12.66%	692	46.60%	-87	-5.86%	1,485
Hamlin	537	50.80%	161	15.23%	359	33.96%	178	16.84%	1,057
Hand	526	44.46%	70	5.92%	587	49.62%	-61	-5.16%	1,183
Hanson	378	36.21%	196	18.77%	470	45.02%	-92	-8.81%	1,044
Hughes	459	62.88%	102	13.97%	169	23.15%	290	39.73%	730
Hutchinson	1,034	64.42%	254	15.83%	317	19.75%	717	44.67%	1,605
Hyde	184	56.44%	51	15.64%	91	27.91%	93	28.53%	326
Jerauld	327	47.05%	45	6.47%	323	46.47%	4	0.58%	695
Kingsbury	951	46.28%	175	8.52%	929	45.21%	22	1.07%	2,055
Lake	742	43.47%	196	11.48%	769	45.05%	-27	-1.58%	1,707
Lawrence	2,140	51.18%	546	13.06%	1,495	35.76%	645	15.43%	4,181
Lincoln	1,130	55.53%	206	10.12%	699	34.35%	431	21.18%	2,035
Marshall	477	43.96%	114	10.51%	494	45.53%	-17	-1.57%	1,085
McCook	573	37.35%	262	17.08%	699	45.57%	-126	-8.21%	1,534
McPherson	487	50.52%	221	22.93%	256	26.56%	231	23.96%	964
Meade	427	36.56%	128	10.96%	613	52.48%	-186	-15.92%	1,168
Miner	486	38.57%	290	23.02%	484	38.41%	2	0.16%	1,260
Minnehaha	2,208	52.31%	484	11.47%	1,529	36.22%	679	16.09%	4,221
Moody	735	53.30%	96	6.96%	548	39.74%	187	13.56%	1,379
Pennington	959	50.66%	147	7.77%	787	41.57%	172	9.09%	1,893
Potter	320	51.12%	57	9.11%	249	39.78%	71	11.34%	626
Roberts	538	62.85%	68	7.94%	250	29.21%	288	33.64%	856
Sanborn	564	55.62%	95	9.37%	355	35.01%	209	20.61%	1,014
Spink	1,133	53.04%	171	8.01%	832	38.95%	301	14.09%	2,136
Stanley	76	49.03%	29	18.71%	50	32.26%	26	16.77%	155
Sully	278	57.44%	39	8.06%	167	34.50%	111	22.93%	484
Turner	1,108	56.68%	429	21.94%	418	21.38%	679	34.73%	1,955
Union	860	43.30%	241	12.13%	885	44.56%	-25	-1.26%	1,986
Walworth	187	44.21%	45	10.64%	191	45.15%	-4	-0.95%	423
Yankton	1,166	53.98%	228	10.56%	766	35.46%	400	18.52%	2,160
Totals	34,888	49.40%	9,085	12.87%	26,644	37.73%	8,244	11.67%	70,617

== See also ==
- United States presidential elections in South Dakota
