= 1908 United States presidential election in South Dakota =

- November 3, 1908

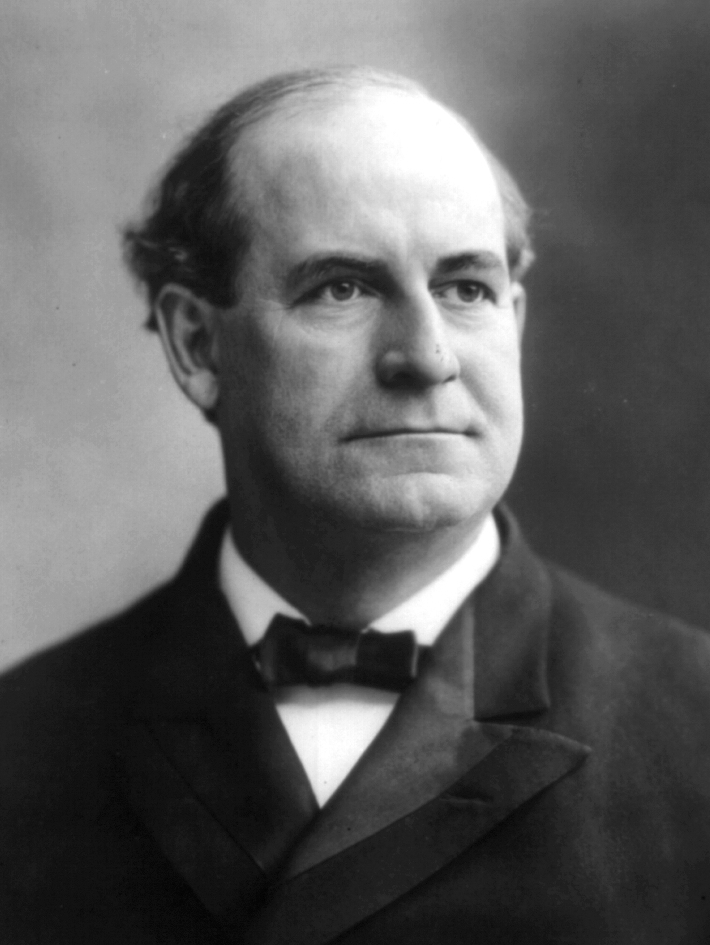
Nominee	William Howard Taft	William Jennings Bryan
Party	Republican	Democratic
Home state	Ohio	Nebraska
Running mate	James S. Sherman	John W. Kern
Electoral vote	4	0
Popular vote	67,536	40,266
Percentage	58.84%	35.08%
County results
Taft
40–50%
50–60%
60–70%
70–80%
80–90%
Bryan
40–50%
50–60%
President before election
Theodore Roosevelt
Republican
Elected President
William Howard Taft
Republican

The 1908 United States presidential election in South Dakota took place on November 3, 1908. Voters chose four representatives, or electors to the Electoral College, who voted for president and vice president.

South Dakota voted for the Republican nominee, Secretary of War William Howard Taft of Ohio and his running mate James S. Sherman of New York. They defeated the Democratic nominees, former U.S. Representative of Nebraska William Jennings Bryan and his running mate John W. Kern of Indiana. Taft won the state by a margin of 23.76 percentage points.

William Bryan had previously won South Dakota during his run against William McKinley in 1896 but would later lose the state to McKinley four years later in 1900 and again in this election.

== Results ==
1908 United States presidential election in South Dakota
Party	Candidate	Running mate	Popular vote		Electoral vote	
Party	Candidate	Running mate	Count	%	Count	%
Republican	William Howard Taft of Ohio	James Schoolcraft Sherman of New York	67,536	58.84%	4	100.00%
Democratic	William Jennings Bryan of Nebraska	John Worth Kern of Indiana	40,266	35.08%	0	0.00%
Prohibition	Eugene Wilder Chafin of Illinois	Aaron Sherman Watkins of Ohio	4,039	3.52%	0	0.00%
Socialist	Eugene Victor Debs of Indiana	Ben Hanford of New York	2,846	2.48%	0	0.00%
Scales of Justice	Thomas Louis Hisgen	John Temple Graves	88	0.08%	0	0.00%
Total			114,775	100.00%	4	100.00%

=== Results by county ===
County	William Howard Taft Republican		William Jennings Bryan Democratic		Eugene W. Chafin Prohibition		Eugene V. Debs Socialist		Thomas L. Hisgen Scales of Justice		Margin		Total votes cast
County	#	%	#	%	#	%	#	%	#	%	#	%	Total votes cast
Aurora	686	47.91%	694	48.46%	48	3.35%	4	0.28%	0	0.00%	-8	-0.56%	1,432
Beadle	1,776	58.50%	1,105	36.40%	96	3.16%	57	1.88%	2	0.07%	671	22.10%	3,036
Bon Homme	1,324	55.26%	1,014	42.32%	47	1.96%	10	0.42%	1	0.04%	310	12.94%	2,396
Brookings	1,697	63.58%	588	22.03%	337	12.63%	45	1.69%	2	0.07%	1,109	41.55%	2,669
Brown	2,646	55.93%	1,772	37.46%	128	2.71%	182	3.85%	3	0.06%	874	18.47%	4,731
Brule	753	46.80%	823	51.15%	12	0.75%	20	1.24%	1	0.06%	-70	-4.35%	1,609
Buffalo	105	58.99%	69	38.76%	0	0.00%	4	2.25%	0	0.00%	36	20.22%	178
Butte	1,636	60.21%	915	33.68%	27	0.99%	139	5.12%	0	0.00%	721	26.54%	2,717
Campbell	627	75.18%	175	20.98%	29	3.48%	3	0.36%	0	0.00%	452	54.20%	834
Charles Mix	1,863	55.88%	1,391	41.72%	32	0.96%	46	1.38%	2	0.06%	472	14.16%	3,334
Clark	1,234	64.37%	557	29.06%	87	4.54%	36	1.88%	3	0.16%	677	35.32%	1,917
Clay	1,291	59.94%	803	37.28%	41	1.90%	19	0.88%	0	0.00%	488	22.66%	2,154
Codington	1,618	63.30%	831	32.51%	75	2.93%	30	1.17%	2	0.08%	787	30.79%	2,556
Custer	487	49.39%	428	43.41%	5	0.51%	64	6.49%	2	0.20%	59	5.98%	986
Davison	1,276	50.92%	1,081	43.14%	135	5.39%	11	0.44%	3	0.12%	195	7.78%	2,506
Day	1,616	59.22%	813	29.79%	256	9.38%	40	1.47%	4	0.15%	803	29.42%	2,729
Deuel	1,022	64.77%	425	26.93%	125	7.92%	4	0.25%	2	0.13%	597	37.83%	1,578
Douglas	836	55.99%	647	43.34%	7	0.47%	3	0.20%	0	0.00%	189	12.66%	1,493
Edmunds	726	50.14%	658	45.44%	56	3.87%	7	0.48%	1	0.07%	68	4.70%	1,448
Fall River	726	57.62%	466	36.98%	43	3.41%	25	1.98%	0	0.00%	260	20.63%	1,260
Faulk	835	62.55%	421	31.54%	74	5.54%	5	0.37%	0	0.00%	414	31.01%	1,335
Grant	1,122	59.87%	628	33.51%	111	5.92%	12	0.64%	1	0.05%	494	26.36%	1,874
Gregory	1,550	52.83%	1,266	43.15%	53	1.81%	64	2.18%	1	0.03%	284	9.68%	2,934
Hamlin	1,095	68.57%	434	27.18%	59	3.69%	8	0.50%	1	0.06%	661	41.39%	1,597
Hand	851	51.58%	655	39.70%	135	8.18%	9	0.55%	0	0.00%	196	11.88%	1,650
Hanson	668	48.69%	630	45.92%	66	4.81%	8	0.58%	0	0.00%	38	2.77%	1,372
Hughes	795	66.64%	349	29.25%	19	1.59%	30	2.51%	0	0.00%	446	37.38%	1,193
Hutchinson	1,507	69.03%	619	28.36%	51	2.34%	6	0.27%	0	0.00%	888	40.68%	2,183
Hyde	455	64.45%	212	30.03%	22	3.12%	17	2.41%	0	0.00%	243	34.42%	706
Jerauld	582	53.30%	403	36.90%	93	8.52%	12	1.10%	2	0.18%	179	16.39%	1,092
Kingsbury	1,537	60.70%	799	31.56%	163	6.44%	33	1.30%	0	0.00%	738	29.15%	2,532
Lake	1,415	65.60%	636	29.49%	65	3.01%	39	1.81%	2	0.09%	779	36.11%	2,157
Lawrence	2,735	50.86%	1,564	29.09%	37	0.69%	1,036	19.27%	5	0.09%	1,171	21.78%	5,377
Lincoln	1,887	69.40%	699	25.71%	84	3.09%	46	1.69%	3	0.11%	1,188	43.69%	2,719
Lyman	1,524	53.12%	1,183	41.23%	81	2.82%	76	2.65%	5	0.17%	341	11.89%	2,869
Marshall	874	59.46%	453	30.82%	116	7.89%	25	1.70%	2	0.14%	421	28.64%	1,470
McCook	1,209	57.00%	826	38.94%	66	3.11%	17	0.80%	3	0.14%	383	18.06%	2,121
McPherson	785	81.86%	157	16.37%	9	0.94%	6	0.63%	2	0.21%	628	65.48%	959
Meade	953	51.24%	792	42.58%	30	1.61%	84	4.52%	1	0.05%	161	8.66%	1,860
Miner	906	53.93%	720	42.86%	42	2.50%	12	0.71%	0	0.00%	186	11.07%	1,680
Minnehaha	4,125	64.07%	1,948	30.26%	254	3.95%	106	1.65%	5	0.08%	2,177	33.81%	6,438
Moody	1,275	63.50%	623	31.03%	80	3.98%	30	1.49%	0	0.00%	652	32.47%	2,008
Pennington	1,702	57.38%	1,160	39.11%	26	0.88%	78	2.63%	0	0.00%	542	18.27%	2,966
Potter	614	58.09%	400	37.84%	24	2.27%	5	0.47%	14	1.32%	214	20.25%	1,057
Roberts	1,562	61.02%	777	30.35%	101	3.95%	119	4.65%	1	0.04%	785	30.66%	2,560
Sanborn	847	57.70%	513	34.95%	103	7.02%	5	0.34%	0	0.00%	334	22.75%	1,468
Spink	1,847	59.01%	1,121	35.81%	126	4.03%	34	1.09%	2	0.06%	726	23.19%	3,130
Stanley	2,313	56.52%	1,598	39.05%	74	1.81%	104	2.54%	3	0.07%	715	17.47%	4,092
Sully	368	68.27%	154	28.57%	5	0.93%	11	2.04%	1	0.19%	214	39.70%	539
Turner	1,792	66.17%	793	29.28%	112	4.14%	11	0.41%	0	0.00%	999	36.89%	2,708
Union	1,392	56.63%	1,009	41.05%	51	2.07%	5	0.20%	1	0.04%	383	15.58%	2,458
Walworth	825	67.96%	351	28.91%	24	1.98%	13	1.07%	1	0.08%	474	39.04%	1,214
Yankton	1,644	56.81%	1,118	38.63%	97	3.35%	31	1.07%	4	0.14%	526	18.18%	2,894
Totals	67,536	58.84%	40,266	35.08%	4,039	3.52%	2,846	2.48%	88	0.08%	27,270	23.76%	114,775

== See also ==
- United States presidential elections in South Dakota
