= South Dakota Highway 224 =

State highway in South Dakota, United States

Highway 224
- SD 224 highlighted in red

Route information
- Maintained by SDDOT
- Length: 7.962 mi (12.814 km)

Major junctions
- West end: Willow Avenue in Alpena
- East end: SD 37 near Huron

Location
- Country: United States
- State: South Dakota
- Counties: Jerauld, Sanborn

Highway system
- South Dakota State Trunk Highway System; Interstate; US; State
← SD 204	→ I-229

South Dakota State Highway 224 (SD 224) is a 7.962-mile-long (12.814 km) state highway located in south-central South Dakota. It connects the town of Alpena to SD 37.

== Route description ==
SD 224 begins at Willow Avenue in the town of Alpena in Jerauld County. The highway travels due east on 221st Street, crossing over a railroad and leaving the town, into Sanborn County. From the county line, SD 224 continues 5 miles (8.0 km) to a junction with SD 37, where the highway ends.

== History ==
SD 224 was designated in 1976 on a segment of former South Dakota Highway 32.

== Main intersections ==
County	Location	mi	km	Destinations	Notes
Jerauld	Alpena	0.000	0.000	Willow Avenue	
Sanborn		7.962	12.814	SD 37 – Huron	
1.000 mi = 1.609 km; 1.000 km = 0.621 mi
