= Jerauld County, South Dakota =

County in South Dakota, United States

- County
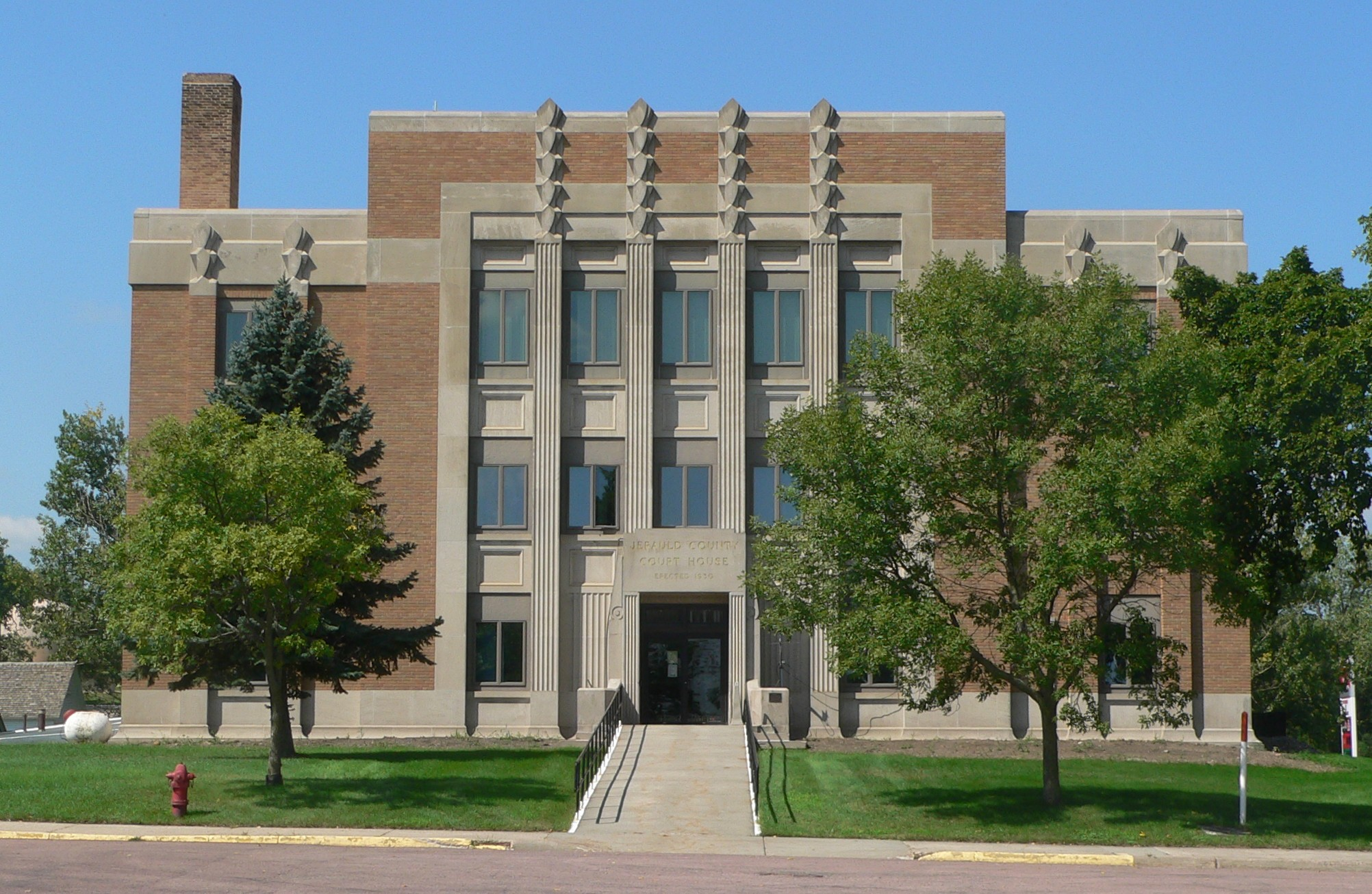
- Jerauld County Courthouse in Wessington Springs

- Location within the U.S. state of South Dakota
- Coordinates: 44°03′48.276″N 98°37′23.412″W
- Country: United States
- State: South Dakota
- Founded: 1883
- Named for: H. J. Jerauld
- Seat: Wessington Springs
- Largest city: Wessington Springs

Area
  - Total: 533 sq mi (1,380 km^{2})
  - Land: 526 sq mi (1,360 km^{2})
  - Water: 6.4 sq mi (17 km^{2}) 1.2%

Population (2020)
  - Total: 1,663
  - Estimate (2025): 1,654 ▼
  - Density: 3.1/sq mi (1.2/km^{2})
- Time zone: UTC−6 (Central)
  - Summer (DST): UTC−5 (CDT)
- Congressional district: At-large
- Website: https://jerauldcountysd.com/

Jerauld County is a county in the U.S. state of South Dakota. As of the 2020 census, the population was 1,663. Its county seat is Wessington Springs.

== History ==
In 1873, the area occupied by the present Jerauld County was organized into Wetmore County. In 1881, Wetmore and its neighbor county to the south, Cragin County, were combined to form Aurora County. In 1883, the area of the former Wetmore County was reincorporated as present-day Jerauld County.

It was named for H. J. Jerauld, a legislator.

== Geography ==
The terrain of Jerauld County consists of low rolling hills, mostly devoted to agriculture. The terrain slopes to the south and east, with the county's highest point on the west boundary line near its NW corner, at 1,932 ft (589 m) ASL. The county has a total area of 533 square miles (1,380 km^{2}), of which 526 square miles (1,360 km^{2}) is land and 6.4 square miles (17 km^{2}) (1.2%) is water.

=== Major highways ===
- U.S. Highway 281
- South Dakota Highway 34
- South Dakota Highway 224

=== Adjacent counties ===
- Beadle County – northeast
- Sanborn County – east
- Aurora County – south
- Brule County – southwest
- Buffalo County – west
- Hand County – northwest

=== Protected areas ===
- Crow Lake State Game Production Area
- Horseshoe Lake State Game Production Area

=== Lakes ===
- Bakers Lake
- Cottonwood Lake
- Horseshoe Lake
- Long Lake
- Rempter Lake
- Twin Lakes (partial)

== Demographics ==
Historical population
Census	Pop.	Note	%±
1890	3,605		—
1900	2,798		−22.4%
1910	5,120		83.0%
1920	6,338		23.8%
1930	5,816		−8.2%
1940	4,752		−18.3%
1950	4,476		−5.8%
1960	4,048		−9.6%
1970	3,310		−18.2%
1980	2,929		−11.5%
1990	2,425		−17.2%
2000	2,295		−5.4%
2010	2,071		−9.8%
2020	1,663		−19.7%
2025 (est.)	1,654	▼	−0.5%
U.S. Decennial Census:

=== 2020 census ===
As of the 2020 census, there were 1,663 people, 747 households, and 463 families residing in the county, with a population density of 3.2 inhabitants per square mile (1.2/km^{2}).

Of the residents, 22.9% were under the age of 18 and 30.1% were 65 years of age or older; the median age was 50.5 years. For every 100 females there were 102.3 males, and for every 100 females age 18 and over there were 97.7 males.

The racial makeup of the county was 93.6% White, 0.1% Black or African American, 0.8% American Indian and Alaska Native, 0.5% Asian, 2.0% from some other race, and 3.0% from two or more races. Hispanic or Latino residents of any race comprised 4.4% of the population.

There were 747 households in the county, of which 25.4% had children under the age of 18 living with them and 23.6% had a female householder with no spouse or partner present. About 35.3% of all households were made up of individuals and 21.3% had someone living alone who was 65 years of age or older.

There were 952 housing units, of which 21.5% were vacant. Among occupied housing units, 77.6% were owner-occupied and 22.4% were renter-occupied. The homeowner vacancy rate was 3.3% and the rental vacancy rate was 18.1%.

=== 2010 census ===
As of the 2010 census, there were 2,071 people, 870 households, and 564 families residing in the county. The population density was 3.9 inhabitants per square mile (1.5/km^{2}). There were 1,070 housing units at an average density of 2.0 units per square mile (0.77 units/km^{2}). The racial makeup of the county was 97.0% white, 0.2% Asian, 0.2% American Indian, 0.1% Pacific islander, 1.6% from other races, and 0.7% from two or more races. Those of Hispanic or Latino origin made up 4.1% of the population. In terms of ancestry, 50.6% were German, 17.7% were Norwegian, 11.6% were English, 6.8% were Irish, 5.3% were Swedish, and 2.2% were American.

Of the 870 households, 20.2% had children under the age of 18 living with them, 55.1% were married couples living together, 6.2% had a female householder with no husband present, 35.2% were non-families, and 30.9% of all households were made up of individuals. The average household size was 2.18 and the average family size was 2.70. The median age was 48.6 years.

The median income for a household in the county was $40,607 and the median income for a family was $44,717. Males had a median income of $32,017 versus $20,505 for females. The per capita income for the county was $24,942. About 10.2% of families and 10.9% of the population were below the poverty line, including 13.3% of those under age 18 and 12.9% of those age 65 or over.

== Politics ==
In the 2008 US presidential election, Republican John McCain won Jerauld County over Democrat Barack Obama by four votes. It was the closest county result in the country in the 2008 election. Jerauld County voters have tended to vote Republican; since 1960 the county has chosen the Republican Party candidate in 71% of national elections.

United States presidential election results for Jerauld County, South Dakota
Year	Republican		Democratic		Third party(ies)	
Year	No.	%	No.	%	No.	%
1892	327	47.05%	45	6.47%	323	46.47%
1896	274	44.48%	336	54.55%	6	0.97%
1900	374	48.57%	357	46.36%	39	5.06%
1904	586	68.86%	139	16.33%	126	14.81%
1908	582	53.30%	403	36.90%	107	9.80%
1912	0	0.00%	436	38.01%	711	61.99%
1916	612	48.42%	589	46.60%	63	4.98%
1920	1,038	57.03%	357	19.62%	425	23.35%
1924	1,054	52.89%	228	11.44%	711	35.67%
1928	1,517	62.69%	875	36.16%	28	1.16%
1932	836	31.28%	1,773	66.33%	64	2.39%
1936	1,075	42.93%	1,343	53.63%	86	3.43%
1940	1,576	63.17%	919	36.83%	0	0.00%
1944	1,217	62.47%	731	37.53%	0	0.00%
1948	1,085	54.60%	876	44.09%	26	1.31%
1952	1,520	69.19%	677	30.81%	0	0.00%
1956	1,175	53.90%	1,005	46.10%	0	0.00%
1960	1,165	57.45%	863	42.55%	0	0.00%
1964	857	46.17%	999	53.83%	0	0.00%
1968	1,002	55.57%	745	41.32%	56	3.11%
1972	988	54.29%	829	45.55%	3	0.16%
1976	821	49.19%	845	50.63%	3	0.18%
1980	1,018	58.88%	595	34.41%	116	6.71%
1984	1,012	64.79%	542	34.70%	8	0.51%
1988	777	50.65%	751	48.96%	6	0.39%
1992	518	35.31%	600	40.90%	349	23.79%
1996	530	38.86%	656	48.09%	178	13.05%
2000	624	55.61%	468	41.71%	30	2.67%
2004	736	59.55%	482	39.00%	18	1.46%
2008	546	49.41%	542	49.05%	17	1.54%
2012	538	53.48%	452	44.93%	16	1.59%
2016	648	67.01%	264	27.30%	55	5.69%
2020	721	71.67%	270	26.84%	15	1.49%
2024	708	70.87%	276	27.63%	15	1.50%

== Media ==
The county is served by the True Dakotan weekly newspaper.

== Communities ==
=== City ===
- Wessington Springs (county seat)

=== Towns ===
- Alpena
- Lane

=== Census-designated place ===
- Spring Valley Colony

=== Unincorporated communities ===
- Crow Lake
- Dale

=== Townships ===
- Alpena
- Anina
- Blaine
- Chery
- Crow
- Crow Lake
- Franklin
- Harmony
- Logan
- Marlar
- Media
- Pleasant
- Viola
- Wessington Springs

=== Unorganized territory ===
- Dale

== See also ==
- National Register of Historic Places listings in Jerauld County, South Dakota
