= 1900 United States presidential election in South Dakota =

- November 6, 1900
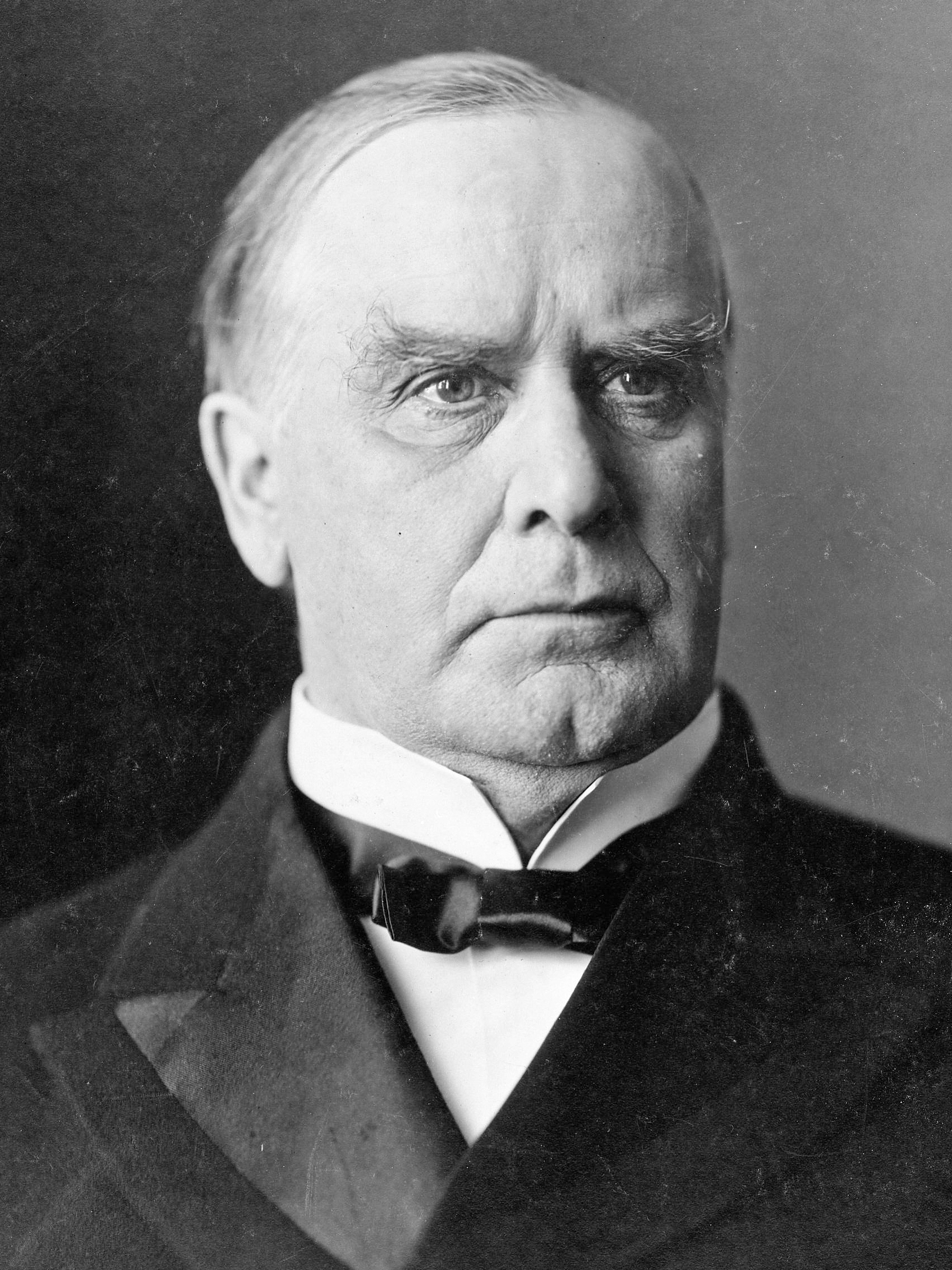

Nominee	William McKinley	William Jennings Bryan
Party	Republican	Democratic
Home state	Ohio	Nebraska
Running mate	Theodore Roosevelt	Adlai Stevenson I
Electoral vote	4	0
Popular vote	54,530	39,544
Percentage	56.73%	41.14%
County results
McKinley
40–50%
50–60%
60–70%
70–80%
Bryan
40–50%
50–60%
Tie
40–50%
President before election
William McKinley
Republican
Elected President
William McKinley
Republican

The 1900 United States presidential election in South Dakota took place on November 6, 1900. All contemporary 45 states were part of the 1900 United States presidential election. State voters chose four electors to the Electoral College, which selected the president and vice president.

South Dakota was won by the Republican nominees, incumbent President William McKinley of Ohio and his running mate Theodore Roosevelt of New York. They defeated the Democratic nominees, former U.S. Representative and 1896 Democratic presidential nominee William Jennings Bryan and his running mate, former Vice President Adlai Stevenson I. McKinley won the state by a margin of 15.59% in this rematch of the 1896 presidential election. The return of economic prosperity and recent victory in the Spanish–American War helped McKinley to score a decisive victory.

McKinley had previously lost the state to Bryan four years earlier, who in turn would lose the state to William Howard Taft in 1908.

== Results ==
1900 United States presidential election in South Dakota
Party	Candidate	Votes	Percentage	Electoral votes
Republican	William McKinley (incumbent)	54,530	56.73%	4
Democratic	William Jennings Bryan	39,544	41.14%	0
Prohibition	John G. Woolley	1,542	1.60%	0
Populist	Wharton Barker	339	0.35%	0
Social Democratic	Eugene V. Debs	169	0.18%	0
Totals		96,124	100.00%	4
Voter turnout				—

=== Results by county ===
County	William McKinley Republican		William Jennings Bryan Democratic		John G. Woolley Prohibition		Wharton Barker Populist		Eugene V. Debs Social Democratic		Margin		Total votes cast
County	#	%	#	%	#	%	#	%	#	%	#	%	Total votes cast
Aurora	503	49.75%	486	48.07%	22	2.18%	0	0.00%	0	0.00%	17	1.68%	1,011
Beadle	1,220	55.53%	915	41.65%	55	2.50%	7	0.32%	0	0.00%	305	13.88%	2,197
Bon Homme	1,271	54.93%	1,028	44.43%	9	0.39%	4	0.17%	2	0.09%	243	10.50%	2,314
Brookings	1,707	57.36%	1,084	36.42%	171	5.75%	8	0.27%	6	0.20%	623	20.93%	2,976
Brown	2,197	54.42%	1,722	42.66%	64	1.59%	25	0.62%	29	0.72%	475	11.77%	4,037
Brule	644	46.00%	746	53.29%	5	0.36%	4	0.29%	1	0.07%	-102	-7.29%	1,400
Buffalo	87	46.28%	100	53.19%	1	0.53%	0	0.00%	0	0.00%	-13	-6.91%	188
Butte	492	53.25%	420	45.45%	1	0.11%	9	0.97%	2	0.22%	72	7.79%	924
Campbell	626	70.42%	250	28.12%	6	0.67%	5	0.56%	2	0.22%	376	42.29%	889
Charles Mix	1,108	50.43%	1,058	48.16%	17	0.77%	5	0.23%	9	0.41%	50	2.28%	2,197
Clark	996	54.16%	752	40.89%	86	4.68%	5	0.27%	0	0.00%	244	13.27%	1,839
Clay	1,387	56.43%	1,037	42.19%	30	1.22%	2	0.08%	2	0.08%	350	14.24%	2,458
Codington	1,225	58.28%	805	38.30%	69	3.28%	2	0.10%	1	0.05%	420	19.98%	2,102
Custer	483	53.37%	415	45.86%	3	0.33%	3	0.33%	1	0.11%	68	7.51%	905
Davison	853	50.27%	782	46.08%	47	2.77%	12	0.71%	3	0.18%	71	4.18%	1,697
Day	1,558	56.37%	1,092	39.51%	105	3.80%	5	0.18%	4	0.14%	466	16.86%	2,764
Deuel	1,052	62.77%	604	36.04%	9	0.54%	9	0.54%	2	0.12%	448	26.73%	1,676
Douglas	649	52.85%	567	46.17%	10	0.81%	0	0.00%	2	0.16%	82	6.68%	1,228
Edmunds	621	51.97%	553	46.28%	16	1.34%	4	0.33%	1	0.08%	68	5.69%	1,195
Fall River	521	54.96%	421	44.41%	3	0.32%	3	0.32%	0	0.00%	100	10.55%	948
Faulk	618	65.05%	302	31.79%	22	2.32%	7	0.74%	1	0.11%	316	33.26%	950
Grant	1,305	62.86%	716	34.49%	47	2.26%	6	0.29%	2	0.10%	589	28.37%	2,076
Gregory	323	55.03%	259	44.12%	4	0.68%	0	0.00%	1	0.17%	64	10.90%	587
Hamlin	928	62.79%	509	34.44%	35	2.37%	6	0.41%	0	0.00%	419	28.35%	1,478
Hand	592	49.05%	594	49.21%	18	1.49%	1	0.08%	2	0.17%	-2	-0.17%	1,207
Hanson	607	49.07%	607	49.07%	21	1.70%	2	0.16%	0	0.00%	0	0.00%	1,237
Hughes	537	65.73%	272	33.29%	4	0.49%	2	0.24%	2	0.24%	265	32.44%	817
Hutchinson	1,528	73.39%	534	25.65%	15	0.72%	5	0.24%	0	0.00%	994	47.74%	2,082
Hyde	286	69.76%	115	28.05%	7	1.71%	2	0.49%	0	0.00%	171	41.71%	410
Jerauld	374	48.57%	357	46.36%	37	4.81%	2	0.26%	0	0.00%	17	2.21%	770
Kingsbury	1,330	58.10%	868	37.92%	75	3.28%	5	0.22%	11	0.48%	462	20.18%	2,289
Lake	1,172	55.57%	901	42.72%	32	1.52%	2	0.09%	2	0.09%	271	12.85%	2,109
Lawrence	3,435	55.96%	2,619	42.67%	24	0.39%	41	0.67%	19	0.31%	816	13.29%	6,138
Lincoln	1,908	59.96%	1,226	38.53%	27	0.85%	18	0.57%	3	0.09%	682	21.43%	3,182
Lyman	429	66.61%	210	32.61%	3	0.47%	2	0.31%	0	0.00%	219	34.01%	644
Marshall	829	51.91%	728	45.59%	30	1.88%	9	0.56%	1	0.06%	101	6.32%	1,597
McCook	978	49.07%	989	49.62%	19	0.95%	4	0.20%	3	0.15%	-11	-0.55%	1,993
McPherson	898	74.15%	297	24.53%	5	0.41%	11	0.91%	0	0.00%	601	49.63%	1,211
Meade	550	48.89%	565	50.22%	2	0.18%	5	0.44%	3	0.27%	-15	-1.33%	1,125
Miner	662	48.01%	697	50.54%	15	1.09%	2	0.15%	3	0.22%	-35	-2.54%	1,379
Minnehaha	3,410	57.04%	2,440	40.82%	109	1.82%	7	0.12%	12	0.20%	970	16.23%	5,978
Moody	1,190	56.91%	875	41.85%	15	0.72%	8	0.38%	3	0.14%	315	15.06%	2,091
Pennington	898	52.92%	784	46.20%	5	0.29%	4	0.24%	6	0.35%	114	6.72%	1,697
Potter	375	47.95%	381	48.72%	23	2.94%	2	0.26%	1	0.13%	-6	-0.77%	782
Roberts	1,875	62.11%	1,067	35.34%	43	1.42%	30	0.99%	4	0.13%	808	26.76%	3,019
Sanborn	628	51.56%	549	45.07%	39	3.20%	1	0.08%	1	0.08%	79	6.49%	1,218
Spink	1,496	56.41%	1,087	40.99%	40	1.51%	15	0.57%	14	0.53%	409	15.42%	2,652
Stanley	254	49.51%	252	49.12%	7	1.36%	0	0.00%	0	0.00%	2	0.39%	513
Sully	294	64.90%	152	33.55%	4	0.88%	1	0.22%	2	0.44%	142	31.35%	453
Turner	1,977	68.22%	871	30.06%	31	1.07%	13	0.45%	6	0.21%	1,106	38.16%	2,898
Union	1,571	53.00%	1,358	45.82%	23	0.78%	9	0.30%	3	0.10%	213	7.19%	2,964
Walworth	478	61.92%	282	36.53%	7	0.91%	4	0.52%	1	0.13%	196	25.39%	772
Yankton	1,639	55.77%	1,268	43.14%	24	0.82%	5	0.17%	3	0.10%	371	12.62%	2,939
Totals	54,574	56.73%	39,568	41.13%	1,541	1.60%	343	0.36%	176	0.18%	15,006	15.60%	96,202

== See also ==
- United States presidential elections in South Dakota
