= United States presidential elections in South Dakota =

Presidential elections in South Dakota
- Number of elections: 34
- Voted Democratic: 4
- Voted Republican: 29
- Voted other: 1 (Note: Theodore Roosevelt, 1912.)
- Voted for winning candidate: 19
- Voted for losing candidate: 15

Following is a table of United States presidential elections in South Dakota, ordered by year. Since its admission to statehood in 1889, South Dakota has participated in every U.S. presidential election.

Winners of the state are in bold. The shading refers to the state winner, and not the national winner.

View source data.

Year	Winner (nationally)	Votes	Percent	Runner-up (nationally)	Votes	Percent	Other national candidates (Note: For purposes of these lists, other national candidates are defined as those who won at least one electoral vote, or won at least ten percent of the vote in multiple states.)	Votes	Percent	Electoral votes	Notes
2024	**Donald Trump**	272,081	63.43	Kamala Harris	146,859	34.24	—			3	
2020	Joe Biden	150,471	35.61	**Donald Trump**	261,043	61.77	—			3	
2016	**Donald Trump** (Note: Won the electoral college while losing the popular vote)	227,721	61.53	Hillary Clinton	117,458	31.74	—			3	
2012	Barack Obama	145,039	39.87	**Mitt Romney**	210,610	57.89	-			3	
2008	Barack Obama	170,924	44.75	**John McCain**	203,054	53.16	-			3	
2004	**George W. Bush**	232,584	59.91	John Kerry	149,244	38.44	-			3	
2000	**George W. Bush**	190,700	60.30	Al Gore	118,804	37.56	-			3	
1996	Bill Clinton	139,333	43.03	**Bob Dole**	150,543	46.49	Ross Perot	31,250	9.65	3	
1992	Bill Clinton	124,888	37.14	**George H. W. Bush**	136,718	40.66	Ross Perot	73,295	21.80	3	
1988	**George H. W. Bush**	165,415	52.85	Michael Dukakis	145,560	46.51	-			3	
1984	**Ronald Reagan**	200,267	63.00	Walter Mondale	116,113	36.53	-			3	
1980	**Ronald Reagan**	198,343	60.53	Jimmy Carter	103,855	31.69	John B. Anderson	21,431	6.54	4	
1976	Jimmy Carter	147,068	48.91	**Gerald Ford**	151,505	50.39	-			4	
1972	**Richard Nixon**	166,476	54.15	George McGovern	139,945	45.52	-			4	
1968	**Richard Nixon**	149,841	53.27	Hubert Humphrey	118,023	41.96	George Wallace	13,400	4.76	4	
1964	**Lyndon B. Johnson**	163,010	55.61	Barry Goldwater	130,108	44.39	-			4	
1960	John F. Kennedy	128,070	41.79	**Richard Nixon**	178,417	58.21	-			4	
1956	**Dwight D. Eisenhower**	171,569	58.39	Adlai Stevenson II	122,288	41.61	T. Coleman Andrews/ Unpledged Electors (Note: Was allied with a slate of unpledged electors in Louisiana, Mississippi and South Carolina)	-		4	
1952	**Dwight D. Eisenhower**	203,857	69.27	Adlai Stevenson II	90,426	30.73	-			4	
1948	Harry S. Truman	117,653	47.04	**Thomas E. Dewey**	129,651	51.84	Strom Thurmond	-		4	
1944	Franklin D. Roosevelt	96,711	41.67	**Thomas E. Dewey**	135,365	58.33	-			4	
1940	Franklin D. Roosevelt	131,362	42.59	**Wendell Willkie**	177,065	57.41	-			4	
1936	**Franklin D. Roosevelt**	160,137	54.02	Alf Landon	125,977	42.49	-			4	
1932	**Franklin D. Roosevelt**	183,515	63.62	Herbert Hoover	99,212	34.40	-			4	
1928	**Herbert Hoover**	157,603	60.18	Al Smith	102,660	39.20	-			5	
1924	**Calvin Coolidge**	101,299	49.69	John W. Davis	27,214	13.35	Robert M. La Follette	75,355	36.96	5	
1920	**Warren G. Harding**	110,692	60.74	James M. Cox	35,938	19.72	Parley P. Christensen	34,707	19.04	5	
1916	Woodrow Wilson	59,191	45.91	**Charles E. Hughes**	64,217	49.80	-			5	
1912	Woodrow Wilson	48,942	42.07	**Theodore Roosevelt**	58,811	50.56	William H. Taft	-	-	5	
1908	**William H. Taft**	67,536	58.84	William Jennings Bryan	40,266	35.08	-			4	
1904	**Theodore Roosevelt**	72,083	71.09	Alton B. Parker	21,969	21.67	-			4	
1900	**William McKinley**	54,530	56.73	William Jennings Bryan	39,544	41.14	-			4	
1896	William McKinley	41,042	49.48	**William Jennings Bryan**	41,225	49.70	-			4	
1892	Grover Cleveland	9,081	12.88	**Benjamin Harrison**	34,888	49.48	James B. Weaver	26,544	37.64	4	

== See also ==
- Elections in South Dakota
