= 1980 United States presidential election in South Dakota =

- November 4, 1980

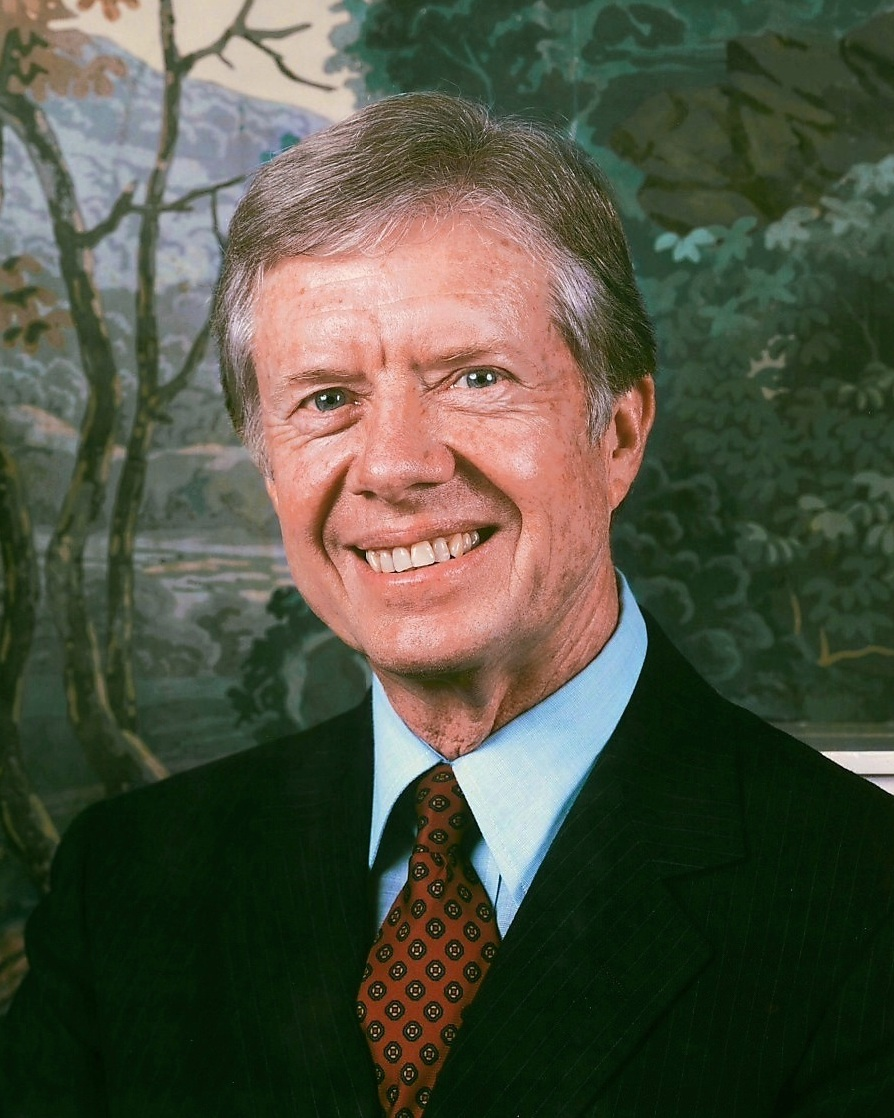

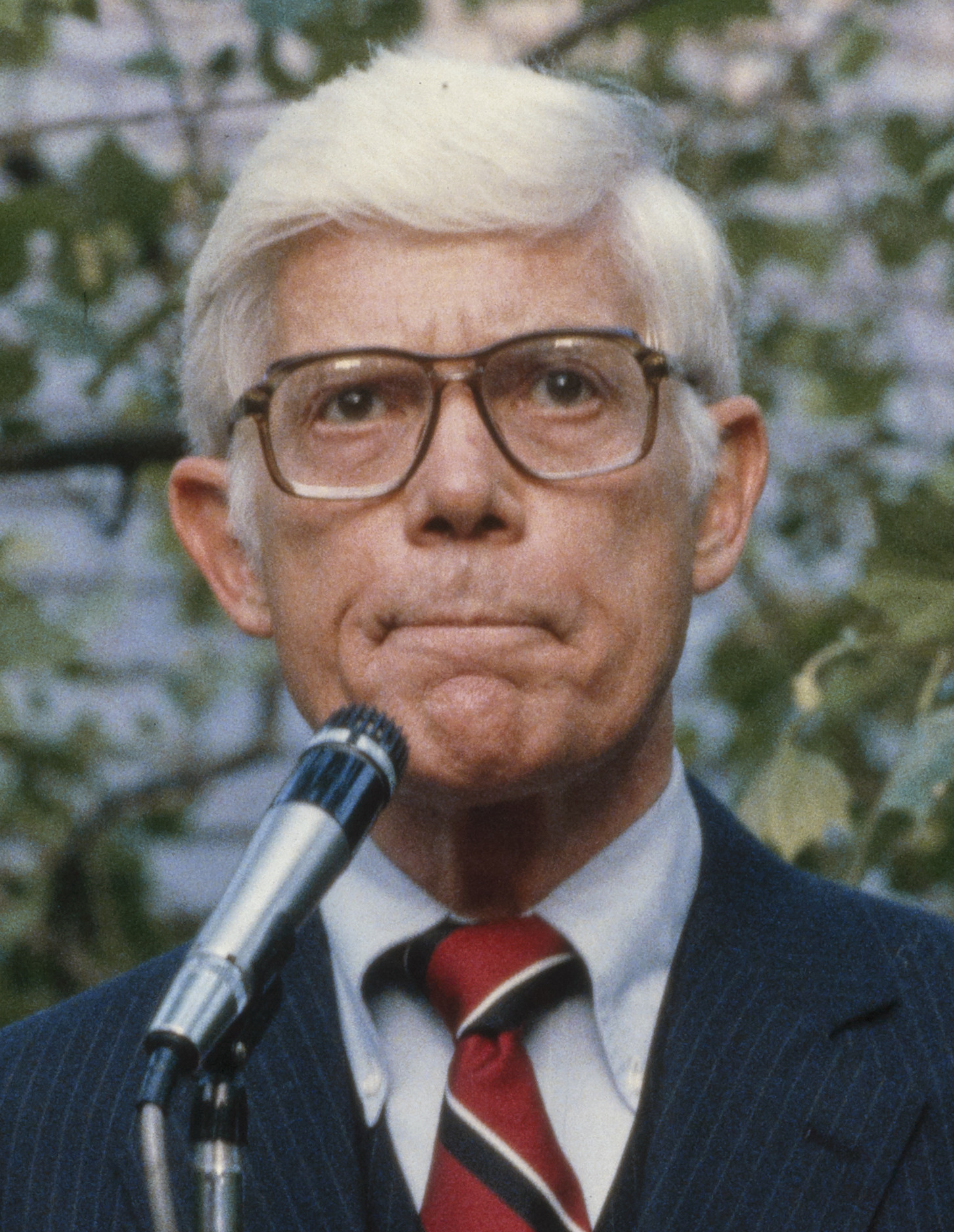
Nominee	Ronald Reagan	Jimmy Carter	John B. Anderson
Party	Republican	Democratic	Independent
Home state	California	Georgia	Illinois
Running mate	George H. W. Bush	Walter Mondale	Patrick Lucey
Electoral vote	4	0	0
Popular vote	198,343	103,855	21,431
Percentage	60.53%	31.69%	6.54%
County results
Reagan
40–50%
50–60%
60–70%
70–80%
80–90%
Carter
50–60%
60–70%
President before election
Jimmy Carter
Democratic
Elected President
Ronald Reagan
Republican

The 1980 United States presidential election in South Dakota took place on November 4, 1980. All 50 states and the District of Columbia were part of the 1980 United States presidential election. Voters chose four electors to the Electoral College, who voted for president and vice president.

South Dakota was won by former California Governor Ronald Reagan (R) by a 29-point landslide. Despite it voting consistently for the Republican Nominee from 1940 to this election (except for 1964), For the last two elections South Dakota had been considered competitive. In 1972, It was Democratic Nominee George McGovern's home state and despite a national landslide, it was the only state that swung to the left from 1968. In 1976, President Gerald Ford only narrowly won the State over Carter by a slim 1.5%. Given this competitive streak for South Dakota, Reagan's overwhelming win in the state was especially surprising with the state swinging 27.4 points to the right this election.

== Results ==
1980 United States presidential election in South Dakota
Party	Candidate	Votes	%
Republican	Ronald Reagan	198,343	60.53%
Democratic	Jimmy Carter (incumbent)	103,855	31.69%
Independent	John B. Anderson	21,431	6.54%
Libertarian	Edward Clark	3,824	1.17%
Socialist Workers	Andrew Pulley	250	0.08%
Majority		94,488	28.84%
Total votes		327,703	100.00%
Republican win			

=== Results by county ===
County	Ronald Reagan Republican		Jimmy Carter Democratic		John B. Anderson Independent		Ed Clark Independent		Andrew Pulley Independent		Margin		Total votes cast
County	#	%	#	%	#	%	#	%	#	%	#	%	Total votes cast
Aurora	1,251	58.93%	709	33.40%	125	5.89%	35	1.65%	3	0.14%	542	25.53%	2,123
Beadle	5,921	58.60%	3,521	34.85%	545	5.39%	109	1.08%	8	0.08%	2,400	23.75%	10,104
Bennett	919	69.41%	350	26.44%	42	3.17%	13	0.98%	0	0.00%	569	42.97%	1,324
Bon Homme	2,794	65.91%	1,191	28.10%	214	5.05%	38	0.90%	2	0.05%	1,603	37.81%	4,239
Brookings	5,727	52.15%	3,934	35.83%	1,169	10.65%	140	1.27%	11	0.10%	1,793	16.32%	10,981
Brown	10,550	58.61%	6,050	33.61%	1,143	6.35%	231	1.28%	25	0.14%	4,500	25.00%	17,999
Brule	1,674	59.79%	925	33.04%	153	5.46%	47	1.68%	1	0.04%	749	26.75%	2,800
Buffalo	272	59.65%	147	32.24%	26	5.70%	11	2.41%	0	0.00%	125	27.41%	456
Butte	2,850	73.11%	843	21.63%	150	3.85%	53	1.36%	2	0.05%	2,007	51.48%	3,898
Campbell	1,271	84.85%	182	12.15%	39	2.60%	6	0.40%	0	0.00%	1,089	72.70%	1,498
Charles Mix	2,608	56.71%	1,741	37.86%	203	4.41%	40	0.87%	7	0.15%	867	18.85%	4,599
Clark	1,963	67.43%	774	26.59%	151	5.19%	22	0.76%	1	0.03%	1,189	40.84%	2,911
Clay	3,004	47.56%	2,271	35.96%	906	14.34%	111	1.76%	24	0.38%	733	11.60%	6,316
Codington	5,903	59.09%	3,353	33.56%	638	6.39%	85	0.85%	11	0.11%	2,550	25.53%	9,990
Corson	1,233	66.47%	522	28.14%	82	4.42%	16	0.86%	2	0.11%	711	38.33%	1,855
Custer	2,057	69.61%	708	23.96%	129	4.37%	60	2.03%	1	0.03%	1,349	45.65%	2,955
Davison	4,743	55.72%	3,107	36.50%	568	6.67%	89	1.05%	5	0.06%	1,636	19.22%	8,512
Day	2,507	55.18%	1,720	37.86%	259	5.70%	56	1.23%	1	0.02%	787	17.32%	4,543
Deuel	1,657	60.39%	891	32.47%	169	6.16%	27	0.98%	0	0.00%	766	27.92%	2,744
Dewey	1,045	59.14%	600	33.96%	109	6.17%	11	0.62%	2	0.11%	445	25.18%	1,767
Douglas	1,855	75.31%	508	20.63%	91	3.69%	9	0.37%	0	0.00%	1,347	54.68%	2,463
Edmunds	1,881	64.55%	883	30.30%	125	4.29%	25	0.86%	0	0.00%	998	34.25%	2,914
Fall River	2,831	69.61%	982	24.15%	184	4.52%	67	1.65%	3	0.07%	1,849	45.46%	4,067
Faulk	1,300	66.84%	520	26.74%	110	5.66%	15	0.77%	0	0.00%	780	40.10%	1,945
Grant	2,691	58.58%	1,602	34.87%	254	5.53%	44	0.96%	3	0.07%	1,089	23.71%	4,594
Gregory	2,283	68.35%	883	26.44%	121	3.62%	50	1.50%	3	0.09%	1,400	41.91%	3,340
Haakon	1,162	79.32%	255	17.41%	38	2.59%	10	0.68%	0	0.00%	907	61.91%	1,465
Hamlin	1,885	62.69%	903	30.03%	197	6.55%	20	0.67%	2	0.07%	982	32.66%	3,007
Hand	2,066	67.38%	803	26.19%	159	5.19%	38	1.24%	0	0.00%	1,263	41.19%	3,066
Hanson	1,015	58.84%	598	34.67%	93	5.39%	18	1.04%	1	0.06%	417	24.17%	1,725
Harding	727	74.64%	205	21.05%	28	2.87%	14	1.44%	0	0.00%	522	53.59%	974
Hughes	4,652	66.00%	1,751	24.84%	554	7.86%	82	1.16%	9	0.13%	2,901	41.16%	7,048
Hutchinson	3,789	73.15%	1,145	22.10%	228	4.40%	15	0.29%	3	0.06%	2,644	51.05%	5,180
Hyde	864	70.76%	273	22.36%	60	4.91%	21	1.72%	3	0.25%	591	48.40%	1,221
Jackson	929	68.71%	354	26.18%	50	3.70%	19	1.41%	0	0.00%	575	42.53%	1,352
Jerauld	1,018	58.88%	595	34.41%	103	5.96%	12	0.69%	1	0.06%	423	24.47%	1,729
Jones	689	74.97%	189	20.57%	37	4.03%	4	0.44%	0	0.00%	500	54.40%	919
Kingsbury	2,376	62.41%	1,132	29.73%	258	6.78%	40	1.05%	1	0.03%	1,244	32.68%	3,807
Lake	3,093	52.85%	2,207	37.71%	504	8.61%	47	0.80%	1	0.02%	886	15.14%	5,852
Lawrence	5,306	63.14%	2,259	26.88%	574	6.83%	250	2.98%	14	0.17%	3,047	36.26%	8,403
Lincoln	3,848	57.45%	2,261	33.76%	524	7.82%	57	0.85%	8	0.12%	1,587	23.69%	6,698
Lyman	1,256	66.88%	486	25.88%	106	5.64%	29	1.54%	1	0.05%	770	41.00%	1,878
Marshall	1,710	56.98%	1,120	37.32%	147	4.90%	22	0.73%	2	0.07%	590	19.66%	3,001
McCook	2,014	56.83%	1,223	34.51%	269	7.59%	36	1.02%	2	0.06%	791	22.32%	3,544
McPherson	2,056	85.60%	287	11.95%	54	2.25%	5	0.21%	0	0.00%	1,769	73.65%	2,402
Meade	5,349	70.93%	1,721	22.82%	342	4.54%	127	1.68%	2	0.03%	3,628	48.11%	7,541
Mellette	624	64.80%	279	28.97%	46	4.78%	14	1.45%	0	0.00%	345	35.83%	963
Miner	1,172	53.98%	833	38.37%	148	6.82%	17	0.78%	1	0.05%	339	15.61%	2,171
Minnehaha	26,256	51.00%	20,008	38.87%	4,658	9.05%	531	1.03%	25	0.05%	6,248	12.13%	51,478
Moody	1,807	51.93%	1,364	39.20%	279	8.02%	29	0.83%	1	0.03%	443	12.73%	3,480
Pennington	18,991	67.33%	7,121	25.25%	1,650	5.85%	433	1.54%	9	0.03%	11,870	42.08%	28,204
Perkins	1,931	72.73%	595	22.41%	93	3.50%	33	1.24%	3	0.11%	1,336	50.32%	2,655
Potter	1,633	75.29%	436	20.10%	81	3.73%	18	0.83%	1	0.05%	1,197	55.19%	2,169
Roberts	2,904	57.98%	1,829	36.51%	235	4.69%	37	0.74%	4	0.08%	1,075	21.47%	5,009
Sanborn	1,178	60.97%	628	32.51%	107	5.54%	19	0.98%	0	0.00%	550	28.46%	1,932
Shannon	438	25.96%	1,132	67.10%	91	5.39%	20	1.19%	6	0.36%	-694	-41.14%	1,687
Spink	2,915	60.30%	1,572	32.52%	294	6.08%	50	1.03%	3	0.06%	1,343	27.78%	4,834
Stanley	892	68.67%	339	26.10%	55	4.23%	12	0.92%	1	0.08%	553	42.57%	1,299
Sully	852	74.15%	220	19.15%	60	5.22%	17	1.48%	0	0.00%	632	55.00%	1,149
Todd	803	41.76%	972	50.55%	112	5.82%	30	1.56%	6	0.31%	-169	-8.79%	1,923
Tripp	2,669	70.68%	947	25.08%	130	3.44%	26	0.69%	4	0.11%	1,722	45.60%	3,776
Turner	3,343	66.43%	1,369	27.21%	281	5.58%	37	0.74%	2	0.04%	1,974	39.22%	5,032
Union	2,788	55.16%	1,830	36.21%	359	7.10%	74	1.46%	3	0.06%	958	18.95%	5,054
Walworth	2,675	74.55%	753	20.99%	139	3.87%	19	0.53%	2	0.06%	1,922	53.56%	3,588
Yankton	5,355	61.22%	2,698	30.84%	553	6.32%	127	1.45%	14	0.16%	2,657	30.38%	8,747
Ziebach	523	65.05%	246	30.60%	30	3.73%	5	0.62%	0	0.00%	277	34.45%	804
Totals	198,343	60.53%	103,855	31.69%	21,431	6.54%	3,824	1.17%	250	0.08%	94,488	28.84%	327,703

==== Counties that flipped from Democratic to Republican ====
- Aurora
- Beadle
- Bon Homme
- Brown
- Brule
- Buffalo
- Charles Mix
- Codington
- Corson
- Davison
- Day
- Deuel
- Edmunds
- Faulk
- Grant
- Gregory
- Hanson
- Jerauld
- Lake
- Marshall
- McCook
- Miner
- Moody
- Roberts
- Sanborn
- Spink
- Union
- Washabaugh
- Ziebach

== See also ==
- Presidency of Ronald Reagan
- United States presidential elections in South Dakota
