= 1932 United States presidential election in South Dakota =

- November 8, 1932

All 4 South Dakota votes to the Electoral College

Nominee	Franklin D. Roosevelt	Herbert Hoover
Party	Democratic	Republican
Home state	New York	California
Running mate	John Nance Garner	Charles Curtis
Electoral vote	4	0
Popular vote	183,515	99,212
Percentage	63.62%	34.40%
County results
Roosevelt
40–50%
50–60%
60–70%
70–80%
80–90%
90–100%
Hoover
50–60%
President before election
Herbert Hoover
Republican
Elected President
Franklin D. Roosevelt
Democratic

The 1932 United States presidential election in South Dakota took place on November 8, 1932, as part of the 1932 United States presidential election. Voters chose four representatives, or electors, to the Electoral College, who voted for president and vice president.

South Dakota was won by Governor Franklin D. Roosevelt (D–New York), running with Speaker John Nance Garner, with 63.62 percent of the popular vote, against incumbent President Herbert Hoover (R–California), running with Vice President Charles Curtis, with 34.40 percent of the popular vote.

As a result of his win in the state, Roosevelt became only the second Democratic presidential candidate to win South Dakota as well as the first since William Jennings Bryan in 1896.

This is the only occasion since South Dakota's statehood when Campbell County, Hutchinson County, Sully County and Turner County have voted for a Democratic presidential candidate, and the last occasion when Butte County and McPherson County have done so. Every county except for arch-Yankee Lawrence County voted for Roosevelt.

This election constitutes the most raw votes a Democrat has ever received in South Dakota. Along with North Dakota in the same year, this is the longest standing such record. It is one of just seven states where a candidate other than Joe Biden in 2020 or Barack Obama in either of his runs holds the record for most raw votes ever received by a Democrat for president, the other six being Rhode Island and West Virginia (Lyndon Johnson), Louisiana and Arkansas (Bill Clinton), North Dakota (Franklin D. Roosevelt), and Oklahoma (Jimmy Carter).

== Results ==
1932 United States presidential election in South Dakota
Party	Candidate	Votes	%
Democratic	Franklin D. Roosevelt	183,515	63.62%
Republican	Herbert Hoover (inc.)	99,212	34.40%
Liberty	William Hope Harvey	3,333	1.16%
Independent	Norman Thomas	1,551	0.54%
Independent	William Upshaw	463	0.16%
Independent	William Foster	364	0.13%
Total votes		288,438	100%

=== Results by county ===
County	Franklin D. Roosevelt Democratic		Herbert Hoover Republican		William Hope Harvey Liberty		Norman Thomas Independent		Various candidates Other parties		Margin		Total votes cast
County	#	%	#	%	#	%	#	%	#	%	#	%	Total votes cast
Aurora	2,304	71.58%	860	26.72%	17	0.53%	33	1.03%	5	0.16%	1,444	44.86%	3,219
Beadle	6,246	66.83%	2,995	32.05%	32	0.34%	58	0.62%	15	0.16%	3,251	34.78%	9,346
Bennett	1,410	73.90%	453	23.74%	22	1.15%	16	0.84%	7	0.37%	957	50.16%	1,908
Bon Homme	3,504	71.72%	1,354	27.71%	9	0.18%	14	0.29%	5	0.10%	2,150	44.00%	4,886
Brookings	3,247	49.20%	3,231	48.96%	33	0.50%	61	0.92%	27	0.41%	16	0.24%	6,599
Brown	8,669	63.74%	4,639	34.11%	89	0.65%	93	0.68%	111	0.82%	4,030	29.63%	13,601
Brule	2,465	74.36%	797	24.04%	5	0.15%	40	1.21%	8	0.24%	1,668	50.32%	3,315
Buffalo	634	69.59%	270	29.64%	5	0.55%	1	0.11%	1	0.11%	364	39.96%	911
Butte	1,684	50.46%	1,594	47.77%	18	0.54%	3	0.09%	38	1.14%	90	2.70%	3,337
Campbell	1,116	58.61%	770	40.44%	12	0.63%	2	0.11%	4	0.21%	346	18.17%	1,904
Charles Mix	5,399	78.86%	1,397	20.41%	15	0.22%	26	0.38%	9	0.13%	4,002	58.46%	6,846
Clark	2,649	61.60%	1,572	36.56%	51	1.19%	13	0.30%	15	0.35%	1,077	25.05%	4,300
Clay	3,040	65.74%	1,514	32.74%	23	0.50%	38	0.82%	9	0.19%	1,526	33.00%	4,624
Codington	4,806	64.98%	2,538	34.32%	23	0.31%	20	0.27%	9	0.12%	2,268	30.67%	7,396
Corson	2,403	68.97%	946	27.15%	111	3.19%	20	0.57%	4	0.11%	1,457	41.82%	3,484
Custer	1,548	60.28%	977	38.05%	21	0.82%	12	0.47%	10	0.39%	571	22.24%	2,568
Davison	5,233	69.96%	2,147	28.70%	40	0.53%	30	0.40%	30	0.40%	3,086	41.26%	7,480
Day	3,910	63.16%	1,983	32.03%	208	3.36%	27	0.44%	63	1.02%	1,927	31.13%	6,191
Deuel	1,658	58.96%	1,131	40.22%	9	0.32%	7	0.25%	7	0.25%	527	18.74%	2,812
Dewey	1,591	68.37%	710	30.51%	18	0.77%	7	0.30%	1	0.04%	881	37.86%	2,327
Douglas	2,005	65.39%	1,045	34.08%	7	0.23%	6	0.20%	3	0.10%	960	31.31%	3,066
Edmunds	2,588	67.47%	1,183	30.84%	23	0.60%	23	0.60%	19	0.50%	1,405	36.63%	3,836
Fall River	2,603	64.61%	1,351	33.53%	41	1.02%	23	0.57%	11	0.27%	1,252	31.07%	4,029
Faulk	1,743	59.49%	1,141	38.94%	16	0.55%	23	0.78%	7	0.24%	602	20.55%	2,930
Grant	2,887	64.56%	1,515	33.88%	33	0.74%	26	0.58%	11	0.25%	1,372	30.68%	4,472
Gregory	3,278	73.30%	1,169	26.14%	18	0.40%	4	0.09%	3	0.07%	2,109	47.16%	4,472
Haakon	1,245	55.73%	797	35.68%	175	7.83%	14	0.63%	3	0.13%	448	20.05%	2,234
Hamlin	1,920	59.44%	1,267	39.23%	14	0.43%	13	0.40%	16	0.50%	653	20.22%	3,230
Hand	2,658	64.75%	1,394	33.96%	33	0.80%	14	0.34%	6	0.15%	1,264	30.79%	4,105
Hanson	1,783	67.28%	845	31.89%	14	0.53%	7	0.26%	1	0.04%	938	35.40%	2,650
Harding	715	49.52%	625	43.28%	76	5.26%	22	1.52%	6	0.42%	90	6.23%	1,444
Hughes	1,852	56.64%	1,374	42.02%	22	0.67%	8	0.24%	14	0.43%	478	14.62%	3,270
Hutchinson	3,630	69.92%	1,504	28.97%	21	0.40%	27	0.52%	10	0.19%	2,126	40.95%	5,192
Hyde	895	56.08%	678	42.48%	8	0.50%	13	0.81%	2	0.13%	217	13.60%	1,596
Jackson	812	60.42%	499	37.13%	23	1.71%	4	0.30%	6	0.45%	313	23.29%	1,344
Jerauld	1,773	66.33%	836	31.28%	33	1.23%	8	0.30%	23	0.86%	937	35.05%	2,673
Jones	929	63.85%	472	32.44%	26	1.79%	23	1.58%	5	0.34%	457	31.41%	1,455
Kingsbury	2,808	55.79%	2,135	42.42%	72	1.43%	11	0.22%	7	0.14%	673	13.37%	5,033
Lake	3,090	57.15%	2,222	41.09%	54	1.00%	37	0.68%	4	0.07%	868	16.05%	5,407
Lawrence	3,106	45.22%	3,708	53.99%	12	0.17%	30	0.44%	12	0.17%	-602	-8.77%	6,868
Lincoln	3,300	59.35%	2,160	38.85%	25	0.45%	66	1.19%	9	0.16%	1,140	20.50%	5,560
Lyman	1,879	68.83%	811	29.71%	23	0.84%	13	0.48%	4	0.15%	1,068	39.12%	2,730
Marshall	2,137	62.01%	935	27.13%	349	10.13%	9	0.26%	16	0.46%	1,202	34.88%	3,446
McCook	2,884	65.22%	1,436	32.47%	89	2.01%	9	0.20%	4	0.09%	1,448	32.75%	4,422
McPherson	2,650	80.25%	606	18.35%	24	0.73%	20	0.61%	2	0.06%	2,044	61.90%	3,302
Meade	2,687	58.31%	1,735	37.65%	126	2.73%	37	0.80%	23	0.50%	952	20.66%	4,608
Mellette	1,583	70.20%	657	29.14%	9	0.40%	5	0.22%	1	0.04%	926	41.06%	2,255
Miner	2,332	68.27%	976	28.57%	85	2.49%	20	0.59%	3	0.09%	1,356	39.70%	3,416
Minnehaha	12,646	54.34%	10,288	44.21%	126	0.54%	152	0.65%	61	0.26%	2,358	10.13%	23,273
Moody	2,547	65.21%	1,289	33.00%	33	0.84%	34	0.87%	3	0.08%	1,258	32.21%	3,906
Pennington	5,178	58.34%	3,638	40.99%	42	0.47%	16	0.18%	1	0.01%	1,540	17.35%	8,875
Perkins	1,852	53.96%	1,406	40.97%	134	3.90%	34	0.99%	6	0.17%	446	13.00%	3,432
Potter	1,668	70.98%	660	28.09%	5	0.21%	9	0.38%	8	0.34%	1,008	42.89%	2,350
Roberts	4,440	69.72%	1,381	21.69%	485	7.62%	40	0.63%	22	0.35%	3,059	48.04%	6,368
Sanborn	2,398	73.09%	860	26.21%	18	0.55%	1	0.03%	4	0.12%	1,538	46.88%	3,281
Shannon	798	63.23%	463	36.69%	1	0.08%	0	0.00%	0	0.00%	335	26.55%	1,262
Spink	4,046	60.98%	2,433	36.67%	104	1.57%	38	0.57%	14	0.21%	1,613	24.31%	6,635
Stanley	757	56.66%	553	41.39%	15	1.12%	4	0.30%	7	0.52%	204	15.27%	1,336
Sully	961	61.25%	559	35.63%	30	1.91%	8	0.51%	11	0.70%	402	25.62%	1,569
Todd	1,485	73.01%	533	26.20%	9	0.44%	5	0.25%	2	0.10%	952	46.80%	2,034
Tripp	3,647	75.26%	1,147	23.67%	16	0.33%	28	0.58%	8	0.17%	2,500	51.59%	4,846
Turner	3,170	58.65%	2,172	40.19%	33	0.61%	24	0.44%	6	0.11%	998	18.46%	5,405
Union	3,530	71.21%	1,381	27.86%	5	0.10%	22	0.44%	19	0.38%	2,149	43.35%	4,957
Walworth	2,221	66.90%	1,049	31.60%	22	0.66%	18	0.54%	10	0.30%	1,172	35.30%	3,320
Washabaugh	612	80.42%	134	17.61%	3	0.39%	6	0.79%	6	0.79%	478	62.81%	761
Washington	342	67.99%	157	31.21%	2	0.40%	1	0.20%	1	0.20%	185	36.78%	503
Yankton	4,930	73.25%	1,693	25.16%	13	0.19%	88	1.31%	6	0.09%	3,237	48.10%	6,730
Ziebach	982	66.67%	462	31.36%	25	1.70%	3	0.20%	1	0.07%	520	35.30%	1,473
Armstrong (Note: No returns were canvassed for Armstrong County and voters from this county were listed in neighbouring counties.)	0	N/A	0	N/A	0	N/A	0	N/A	0	N/A	N/A	N/A	0
Totals	183,515	63.62%	99,212	34.40%	3,333	1.16%	1,551	0.54%	827	0.29%	84,303	29.23%	288,438

==== Counties that flipped from Republican to Democratic ====
- Aurora
- Beadle
- Bennett
- Bon Homme
- Brookings
- Brown
- Buffalo
- Butte
- Campbell
- Charles Mix
- Clark
- Clay
- Codington
- Corson
- Custer
- Davsion
- Day
- Deuel
- Douglas
- Edmunds
- Fall River
- Faulk
- Grant
- Gregory
- Haakon
- Hamlin
- Hand
- Hanson
- Harding
- Hughes
- Hutchinson
- Hyde
- Jackson
- Jerauld
- Jones
- Kingsbury
- Lake
- Lincoln
- Lyman
- Marshall
- McCook
- Meade
- Mellette
- Miner
- Minnehaha
- Moody
- Pennington
- Perkins
- Potter
- Roberts
- Sanborn
- Spink
- Stanley
- Sully
- Tripp
- Turner
- Union
- Walworth
- Washabaugh
- Yankton
- Ziebach

== See also ==
- United States presidential elections in South Dakota
