= 1896 United States presidential election in South Dakota =

- November 3, 1896

Nominee	William Jennings Bryan	William McKinley
Party	Populist	Republican
Alliance	Democratic	-
Home state	Nebraska	Ohio
Running mate	Arthur Sewall (Democratic); Thomas E. Watson (Populist)	Garret Hobart
Electoral vote	4	0
Popular vote	41,225	41,042
Percentage	49.70%	49.48%
County results
Bryan
40–50%
50–60%
60–70%
McKinley
40–50%
50–60%
60–70%
70–80%
80–90%
Tie
50%
President before election
Grover Cleveland
Democratic
Elected President
William McKinley
Republican

The 1896 United States presidential election in South Dakota took place on November 3, 1896. All contemporary 45 states were part of the 1896 United States presidential election. Voters chose four electors to the Electoral College, which selected the president and vice president.

South Dakota was won by the Populist nominees, (Note: Although Bryan ran nationally as the Democratic nominee, that party was so weak in South Dakota that Bryan was instead endorsed by the state’s Populist Party, which was the major competitor with the GOP.) former U.S. Representative William Jennings Bryan of Nebraska and his running mate Arthur Sewall of Maine. Two electors cast their vice presidential ballots for Thomas E. Watson.

Bryan won the state by a very narrow margin of 0.22 percentage points, becoming the first national Democratic presidential candidate to win the state. Bryan would later lose the state to Republican incumbent president William McKinley four years later and would later lose the state again to William Howard Taft in 1908. The state would not vote Democratic again until 1932. As of the 2024 election, this is the only time that a Republican candidate has won the presidency without carrying South Dakota.

== Results ==
1896 United States presidential election in South Dakota
Party	Candidate	Votes	Percentage	Electoral votes
Populist	William Jennings Bryan	41,225	49.70%	2
Democratic	William Jennings Bryan	0	0.00%	2
Total	William Jennings Bryan	41,225	49.70%	4
Republican	William McKinley	41,042	49.48%	0
Prohibition	Joshua Levering	683	0.82%	0
Totals		82,950	100.00%	4
Voter turnout				—

=== Results by county ===
County	William McKinley Republican		William Jennings Bryan Populist		Joshua Levering Prohibition		Margin		Total votes cast
County	#	%	#	%	#	%	#	%	Total votes cast
Aurora	387	44.08%	479	54.56%	12	1.37%	-92	-10.48%	878
Beadle	935	49.84%	915	48.77%	26	1.39%	20	1.07%	1,876
Bon Homme	1,163	56.37%	893	43.29%	7	0.34%	270	13.09%	2,063
Brookings	1,263	48.71%	1,288	49.67%	42	1.62%	-25	-0.96%	2,593
Brown	1,618	46.15%	1,867	53.25%	21	0.60%	-249	-7.10%	3,506
Brule	441	39.59%	668	59.96%	5	0.45%	-227	-20.38%	1,114
Buffalo	68	46.26%	79	53.74%	0	0.00%	-11	-7.48%	147
Butte	222	43.53%	286	56.08%	2	0.39%	-64	-12.55%	510
Campbell	449	54.62%	369	44.89%	4	0.49%	80	9.73%	822
Charles Mix	698	53.57%	594	45.59%	11	0.84%	104	7.98%	1,303
Clark	695	45.01%	816	52.85%	33	2.14%	-121	-7.84%	1,544
Clay	1,238	53.36%	1,061	45.73%	21	0.91%	177	7.63%	2,320
Codington	1,041	57.10%	759	41.63%	23	1.26%	282	15.47%	1,823
Custer	429	45.30%	515	54.38%	3	0.32%	-86	-9.08%	947
Davison	616	45.13%	733	53.70%	16	1.17%	-117	-8.57%	1,365
Day	1,171	48.07%	1,230	50.49%	35	1.44%	-59	-2.42%	2,436
Deuel	698	50.95%	668	48.76%	4	0.29%	30	2.19%	1,370
Douglas	533	58.06%	380	41.39%	5	0.54%	153	16.67%	918
Edmunds	371	41.78%	510	57.43%	7	0.79%	-139	-15.65%	888
Fall River	532	48.76%	555	50.87%	4	0.37%	-23	-2.11%	1,091
Faulk	430	64.08%	237	35.32%	4	0.60%	193	28.76%	671
Grant	1,029	52.72%	902	46.21%	21	1.08%	127	6.51%	1,952
Hamlin	702	55.10%	559	43.88%	13	1.02%	143	11.22%	1,274
Hand	451	43.96%	567	55.26%	8	0.78%	-116	-11.31%	1,026
Hanson	420	38.75%	658	60.70%	6	0.55%	-238	-21.96%	1,084
Hughes	462	58.33%	327	41.29%	3	0.38%	135	17.05%	792
Hutchinson	1,413	74.96%	458	24.30%	14	0.74%	955	50.66%	1,885
Hyde	223	64.45%	121	34.97%	2	0.58%	102	29.48%	346
Jerauld	274	44.48%	336	54.55%	6	0.97%	-62	-10.06%	616
Kingsbury	950	46.82%	1,051	51.80%	28	1.38%	-101	-4.98%	2,029
Lake	864	46.10%	999	53.31%	11	0.59%	-135	-7.20%	1,874
Lawrence	2,210	42.91%	2,905	56.41%	35	0.68%	-695	-13.50%	5,150
Lincoln	1,516	51.86%	1,393	47.66%	14	0.48%	123	4.21%	2,923
Lyman	114	59.07%	78	40.41%	1	0.52%	36	18.65%	193
Marshall	553	43.78%	694	54.95%	16	1.27%	-141	-11.16%	1,263
McCook	678	39.03%	1,047	60.28%	12	0.69%	-369	-21.24%	1,737
McPherson	512	58.25%	361	41.07%	6	0.68%	151	17.18%	879
Meade	550	40.56%	802	59.14%	4	0.29%	-252	-18.58%	1,356
Miner	582	45.05%	705	54.57%	5	0.39%	-123	-9.52%	1,292
Minnehaha	2,429	47.15%	2,667	51.77%	56	1.09%	-238	-4.62%	5,152
Moody	780	43.36%	1,012	56.25%	7	0.39%	-232	-12.90%	1,799
Pennington	739	41.40%	1,038	58.15%	8	0.45%	-299	-16.75%	1,785
Potter	333	45.74%	390	53.57%	5	0.69%	-57	-7.83%	728
Roberts	1,324	58.20%	929	40.84%	22	0.97%	395	17.36%	2,275
Sanborn	530	50.72%	500	47.85%	15	1.44%	30	2.87%	1,045
Spink	1,132	51.31%	1,061	48.10%	13	0.59%	71	3.22%	2,206
Stanley	89	38.53%	140	60.61%	2	0.87%	-51	-22.08%	231
Sully	262	56.34%	198	42.58%	5	1.08%	64	13.76%	465
Turner	1,616	62.47%	950	36.72%	21	0.81%	666	25.74%	2,587
Union	1,297	46.24%	1,491	53.16%	17	0.61%	-194	-6.92%	2,805
Walworth	250	46.21%	286	52.87%	5	0.92%	-36	-6.65%	541
Yankton	1,423	51.39%	1,330	48.03%	16	0.58%	93	3.36%	2,769
Unorganized	337	47.73%	368	52.12%	1	0.14%	-31	-4.39%	706
Totals	41,042	49.48%	41,225	49.70%	683	0.82%	-183	-0.22	82,950

== See also ==
- United States presidential elections in South Dakota
