= Government of South Dakota =

Government of the U.S. state of South Dakota

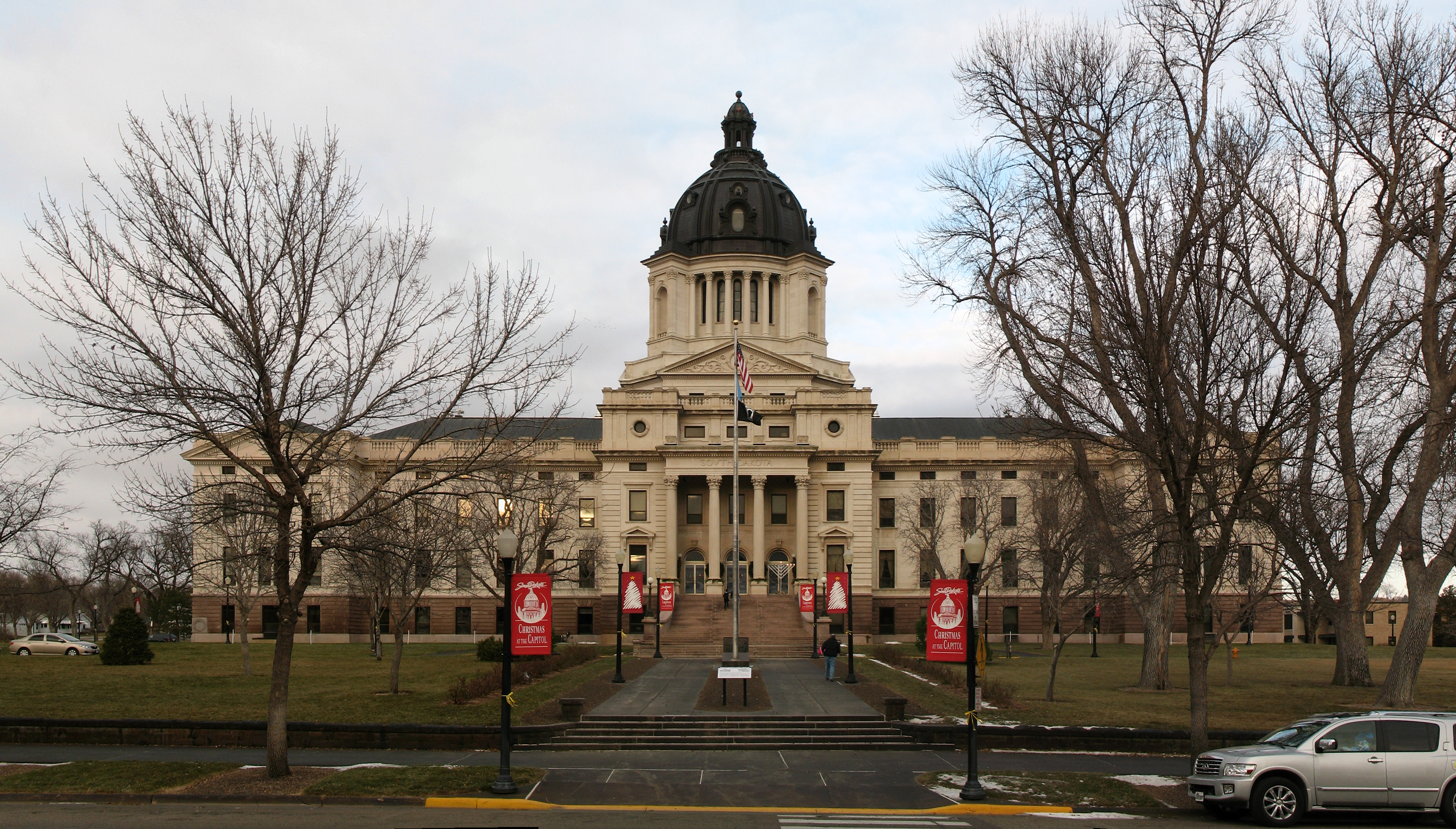
State capitol building in Pierre

The structure of the government of South Dakota is based on that of the federal government, with three branches of government: executive, legislative, and judicial. The structure of the state government is laid out in the Constitution of South Dakota, the highest law in the state. The constitution may be amended either by a majority vote of both houses of the legislature, or by voter initiative.

== Executive branch ==
The governor of South Dakota heads the executive branch of the state government. The state constitution gives the governor the power to either sign into law or veto bills passed by the state legislature, to serve as commander-in-chief of the state's armed forces, to appoint a cabinet, and to commute criminal sentences or to pardon those convicted of crimes. The governor serves for a four-year term, and may not serve more than two consecutive terms.

The current governor is Larry Rhoden, a Republican from Sturgis. The lieutenant governor is Tony Venhuizen (R), the attorney general is Marty Jackley (R), the commissioner of school and public lands is Brock Greenfield (R), the secretary of state is Monae Johnson (R), the state auditor is Rich Sattgast (R), and the treasurer is Josh Haeder (R).

== Legislature ==
Map showing the 35 legislative districts of South Dakota from 2008. Every district elects one senator and two representatives to the state legislature.

The state legislature is made up of two bodies, the Senate, which has 35 members, and the House of Representatives, with 70 members. South Dakota is divided into 35 legislative districts, with voters electing two representatives and one senator per district. The legislature meets for an annual session which begins on the second Tuesday in January and lasts for 40 days. it also meets if a special session is called by the governor. The Republican Party currently holds majorities in both houses of the South Dakota Legislature. Currently, the Senate consists of 30 Republicans and 5 Democrats, while the House of Representatives is made up of 59 Republicans, 11 Democrats State law currently limits legislators to a maximum of four consecutive terms in the same house of the Legislature.

== Judicial branch ==
The judicial branch is made up of several levels. The state supreme court, with four justices and a chief justice, is the highest court in the state. Below the supreme court are the circuit courts; 41 circuit judges serve in seven judicial circuits in the state. Below the circuit courts are the magistrate courts, which deal with more minor criminal and civil actions.

== Federal representation ==
South Dakota is represented at the federal level by Senator Mike Rounds, Senator John Thune, and Representative Dusty Johnson. All the federal representatives are Republicans, this hasn't been the case since 1961. South Dakota is one of seven states with only one seat in the US House of Representatives.

South Dakota is part of the United States District Court for the District of South Dakota in the federal judiciary. The district's cases are appealed to the St-Louis-based United States Court of Appeals for the Eighth Circuit.

== Native government ==
Native Americans' governments are significantly independent of the state and its local governments. For example, federal law forbids states and local authorities to tax Indian lands.

== Politics ==
United States presidential election results for South Dakota
Year	Republican		Democratic		Third party(ies)	
Year	No.	%	No.	%	No.	%
1892	34,888	49.48%	9,081	12.88%	26,544	37.64%
1896	41,042	49.48%	41,225	49.70%	683	0.82%
1900	54,530	56.73%	39,544	41.14%	2,050	2.13%
1904	72,083	71.09%	21,969	21.67%	7,343	7.24%
1908	67,536	58.84%	40,266	35.08%	6,973	6.08%
1912	0	0.00%	48,942	42.07%	67,383	57.93%
1916	64,217	49.80%	59,191	45.91%	5,534	4.29%
1920	110,692	60.74%	35,938	19.72%	35,611	19.54%
1924	101,299	49.69%	27,214	13.35%	75,355	36.96%
1928	157,603	60.18%	102,660	39.20%	1,602	0.61%
1932	99,212	34.40%	183,515	63.62%	5,711	1.98%
1936	125,977	42.49%	160,137	54.02%	10,338	3.49%
1940	177,065	57.41%	131,362	42.59%	0	0.00%
1944	135,365	58.33%	96,711	41.67%	0	0.00%
1948	129,651	51.84%	117,653	47.04%	2,801	1.12%
1952	203,857	69.27%	90,426	30.73%	0	0.00%
1956	171,569	58.39%	122,288	41.61%	0	0.00%
1960	178,417	58.21%	128,070	41.79%	0	0.00%
1964	130,108	44.39%	163,010	55.61%	0	0.00%
1968	149,841	53.27%	118,023	41.96%	13,400	4.76%
1972	166,476	54.15%	139,945	45.52%	994	0.32%
1976	151,505	50.39%	147,068	48.91%	2,105	0.70%
1980	198,343	60.53%	103,855	31.69%	25,505	7.78%
1984	200,267	63.00%	116,113	36.53%	1,487	0.47%
1988	165,415	52.85%	145,560	46.51%	2,016	0.64%
1992	136,718	40.66%	124,888	37.14%	74,648	22.20%
1996	150,543	46.49%	139,333	43.03%	33,950	10.48%
2000	190,700	60.30%	118,804	37.56%	6,765	2.14%
2004	232,584	59.91%	149,244	38.44%	6,387	1.65%
2008	203,054	53.16%	170,924	44.75%	7,997	2.09%
2012	210,610	57.89%	145,039	39.87%	8,166	2.24%
2016	227,721	61.53%	117,458	31.74%	24,914	6.73%
2020	261,043	61.77%	150,471	35.61%	11,095	2.63%
2024	272,081	63.43%	146,859	34.24%	9,982	2.33%

South Dakota politics are generally dominated by the Republican Party, and the state has not supported a Democratic presidential candidate since 1964—especially notable when one considers that George McGovern, the Democratic nominee in 1972, was from South Dakota. Since statehood, it has only voted Democratic four times, in 1896, 1932, 1936, and 1964, as well as for the Progressive candidate in 1912.

There are only five reliably Democratic counties in the state—most of them with primarily Native American populations. Republicans have won the last 13 gubernatorial elections and have controlled the legislature, with one brief interruption, for over thirty years. Democrats, however, have been successful in winning election to Congress from South Dakota, including former Senators Tom Daschle, who served as Majority Leader, James Abourezk, George McGovern, and Tim Johnson; and former Representative Stephanie Herseth Sandlin.

While President Bush received a lower vote percentage in 2004 than he did in 2000, he still received a very strong 60% of the popular vote. Part of the deviation had to do with record turnout driven by the intense Senate campaigns that year. As of 2016, Republicans hold a 15% voter registration advantage over Democrats and hold large majorities in both the state House of Representatives and Senate. Additionally, all but one of the statewide elected officers are Republicans.

In the more than a quarter century between 1979 and 2005, two politicians, one a Republican and one a Democrat, dominated South Dakota politics. Republican Governor Bill Janklow served four terms as governor from 1979 to 1987 and then from 1995 to 2003 followed by a brief partial term as a United States representative from 2003 to 2004. Janklow's career was ended by a motor vehicle manslaughter conviction causing his resignation from Congress. Democrat Tom Daschle was also a dominant figure in South Dakota politics, serving in Congress, 1979–2005. He first served eight years in the United States House of Representatives and then eighteen years in the United States Senate after his senate election in 1986. Over a period of ten years, he served both as minority leader and majority leader in the Senate. In 2004, he lost his Senate seat to a Republican, former United States representative John Thune, who narrowly defeated Daschle by a 51%-49% margin. Daschle became the first Senate party leader in 52 years to lose re-election to his own Senate seat.

South Dakota has a history of voting out powerful members of the Senate who seek fourth terms. Former Commerce Committee Chairman Larry Pressler lost to Congressman Tim Johnson in 1996, and 1972 Democratic presidential nominee George McGovern was defeated by Congressman James Abdnor in 1980. Abdnor was, in turn, defeated by Daschle in 1986.

=== Political geography ===
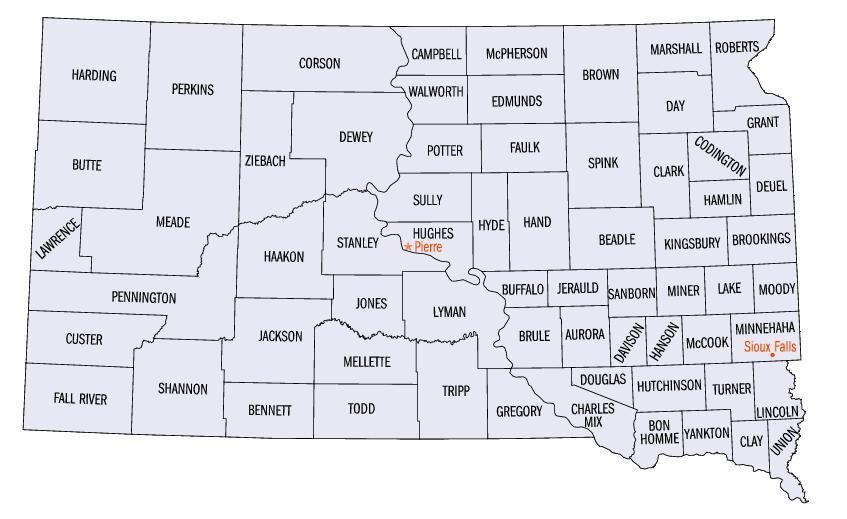
Map showing the counties of South Dakota

The Missouri River, bisects the state. The area east of the Missouri River (or "East River"), is generally more moderate, with views that are more in line with those found in its Midwestern neighbors, Iowa and Minnesota. "West River" is more conservative, with views that are generally more in line with those found in its western neighbors, Montana and Wyoming. Large exceptions exist to the East River-West River political generalizations, however. The strongest Democratic counties in the state are West River. These counties are located within Indian Reservations. The strongest Republican counties are located East River. These counties were primarily settled by Protestant Germans from Russia, and be they Mennonite, Lutheran, Baptist or Reformed, they vote overwhelmingly Republican. A large part of the western half of East River responds politically in the same fashion as West River. Many observers think that the James River Valley really is the political dividing line between East River political thought and West River political thought.

== Recent elections ==
=== 2006 election ===
In the 2006 midterm elections, little change occurred in South Dakota in statewide elections. The Republicans defeated the sole Democratic state officeholder previously elected statewide, but lost another statewide elected office to the Democrats. Otherwise, all federal and state officeholders were comfortably re-elected. The Democrats made a significant gain in the state senate, narrowing the Republican margin from 25–10 to 20–15, costing the Republican legislative leadership its two-thirds majority in both houses of the legislature.

By referendum, the electorate rejected an abortion ban approved by the state legislature. 56% of the electorate voted to overturn the law, generally considered a direct challenge to Roe v. Wade. Additionally, the electorate rejected a proposed law permitting the use of marijuana for medical purposes, and narrowly approved a state constitutional amendment banning same-sex marriage. The prevailing side received a 52%–48% margin in both cases.

=== 2008 election ===
Senator Tim Johnson defeated state Sen. Joel Dykstra on November 4, 2008. Congresswoman Stephanie Herseth Sandlin defeated Rapid City businessman Chris Lien. Both were the last Democrats to win statewide elections in South Dakota.

=== 2010 election ===
In 2010, Republican Dennis Daugaard defeated Democrat Scott Heidepriem for governor, and Republican Kristi Noem defeated incumbent Congresswoman Stephanie Herseth Sandlin for South Dakota's at-large seat in the US House of Representatives. Republican John Thune won a second term as US senator, running unopposed in 2010.

=== 2012 election ===
In 2012, Noem retained her seat with 57% of the vote and the state voted for Republican nominee Mitt Romney over Democratic President Barack Obama by a margin of 18%.

=== 2014 election ===
Republican Dennis Daugaard won re-election with 70.47% over Susan Wismer with 25.43%. Mike Rounds won his campaign over Rick Weiland.

== Issues ==
As of 2005, South Dakota has the lowest per capita total state tax rate in the United States. The state does not levy personal or corporate income taxes, inheritance taxes, or taxes on intangible personal property. The state sales tax rate is 4.5 percent. Various localities have local levies so in some areas the rate is 6 percent. The state sales tax does not apply to sales to Indians on Indian reservations, but many reservations have a compact with the state. Businesses on the reservation collect the tax and the state refunds to the Indian Tribes the percentage of sales tax collections relating to the ratio of Indian population to total population in the county or area affected. Ad valorem property taxes are local taxes and are a large source of funding for school systems, counties, municipalities and other local government units. The South Dakota Special Tax Division regulates some taxes including cigarette and alcohol-related taxes.

== U.S. senators ==
Seat 1
Senator	Took office	Left office	Party
Mike Rounds	2015	present	Republican
Tim Johnson	1997	2015	Democrat
Larry Pressler	1979	1997	Republican
James Abourezk	1973	1979	Democrat
Karl E. Mundt	1948	1973	Republican
Vera C. Bushfield	1948	1948	Republican
Harlan J. Bushfield	1943	1948	Republican
William J. Bulow	1931	1943	Democrat
William H. McMaster	1925	1931	Republican
Thomas Sterling	1913	1925	Republican
Robert J. Gamble	1901	1913	Republican
Richard F. Pettigrew	1889	1901	Republican

Seat 2
Senator	Took office	Left office	Party
John Thune	2005	present	Republican
Tom Daschle	1987	2005	Democrat
James Abdnor	1981	1987	Republican
George McGovern	1963	1981	Democrat
Joseph H. Bottum	1962	1963	Republican
Francis H. Case	1951	1962	Republican
J. Chandler Gurney	1939	1951	Republican
Gladys Pyle	1938	1939	Republican
Herbert E. Hitchcock	1936	1938	Democrat
Peter Norbeck	1921	1936	Republican
Edwin S. Johnson	1915	1921	Democrat
Coe I. Crawford	1909	1915	Republican
Alfred B. Kittredge	1901	1909	Republican
James H. Kyle	1891	1901	Populist
Gideon C. Moody	1889	1891	Republican
