= Badnation, South Dakota =

Unincorporated community in South Dakota, United States

Coordinates: 43°39′06″N 100°22′11″W

Badnation is an unincorporated community in Mellette County, in the U.S. state of South Dakota.

== History ==
Badnation was originally called Runningville. A post office called Runningville was established in 1916, the name was changed to Badnation in 1938, and the post office closed in 1942. The community takes its present name from Bad Nation Township.
