= Whitlocks Crossing, South Dakota =

Ghost town in the U.S. state of South Dakota

Coordinates: 45°02′47″N 100°17′16″W

Whitlocks Crossing is a ghost town in Potter County, in the U.S. state of South Dakota.

== History ==
A post office called Whitlocks Crossing was established in 1935, and remained in operation until 1954. The town was named for the original owner of the town site.
