= Cow Creek =

Cow Creek may refer to:

== Places in the United States ==
- Cow Creek, Kentucky
- Cow Creek, South Dakota
- Cow Creek, a CCC camp in Death Valley National Park later used as a detention facility for Japanese Americans in WWII

== Streams and rivers in the United States ==
- Cow Creek (Sacramento River tributary), California
- Cow Creek (Kansas)
- Cow Creek (Montana), a tributary of the Missouri River
- Cow Creek (Jordan Creek), Oregon
- Cow Creek (South Umpqua River), a stream in southern Oregon
- Cow Creek (Washington), a river in Washington

== Other uses ==
- Cow Creek Band of Umpqua Tribe of Indians, a Native American tribe from the Cow Creek area of Oregon
- Cow Creek Skirmish, a minor American Civil War skirmish in Pittsburg, Kansas
