= Washabaugh County, South Dakota =

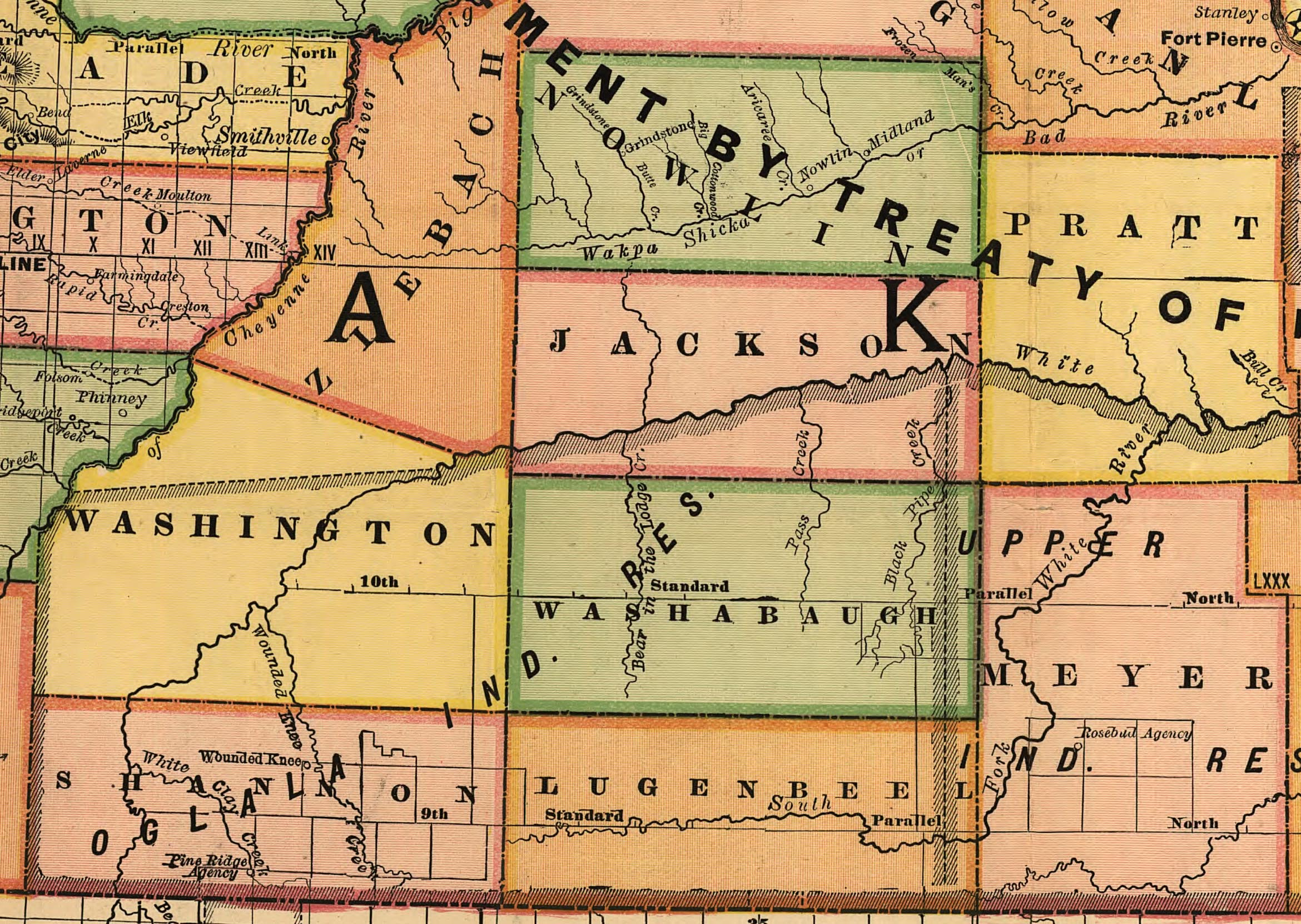
- Map of Washabaugh County showing its boundaries in 1892
- Coordinates: 43°33′10″N 101°41′12″W
- County: United States
- State: South Dakota
- Established: March 9, 1883
- Dissolved: January 1, 1983

Area
  - Total: 1,061 sq mi (2,750 km^{2})
- Elevation: 2,713 ft (827 m)

Population (1970)
  - Total: 1,389
  - Density: 1.3/sq mi (0.50/km^{2})
- GNIS feature ID: 1265805

Washabaugh County was a county in South Dakota. The county was named after Frank J. Washabaugh, a prominent South Dakota politician.

== History ==
First established in 1883 as a county in Dakota Territory from a part of Lugenbeel County, it became a county in the new state of South Dakota in 1889. Washabaugh remained an unorganized county, attached to various other counties for judicial purposes, until it merged with Jackson County in 1983. When Absaroka was proposed as a new state in the late 1930s, its territory included Washabaugh County.

United States presidential election results for Washabaugh County, South Dakota
| Year | Republican | | Democratic | | Third party(ies) | |
| Year | No. | % | No. | % | No. | % |
|---|---|---|---|---|---|---|
| 1924 | 246 | 57.88% | 121 | 28.47% | 58 | 13.65% |
| 1928 | 294 | 50.69% | 282 | 48.62% | 4 | 0.69% |
| 1932 | 134 | 17.61% | 612 | 80.42% | 15 | 1.97% |
| 1936 | 238 | 42.42% | 313 | 55.79% | 10 | 1.78% |
| 1940 | 358 | 48.91% | 374 | 51.09% | 0 | 0.00% |
| 1944 | 139 | 48.77% | 146 | 51.23% | 0 | 0.00% |
| 1948 | 192 | 45.82% | 223 | 53.22% | 4 | 0.95% |
| 1952 | 319 | 68.45% | 147 | 31.55% | 0 | 0.00% |
| 1956 | 265 | 58.89% | 185 | 41.11% | 0 | 0.00% |
| 1960 | 260 | 54.97% | 213 | 45.03% | 0 | 0.00% |
| 1964 | 211 | 37.75% | 348 | 62.25% | 0 | 0.00% |
| 1968 | 224 | 49.89% | 203 | 45.21% | 22 | 4.90% |
| 1972 | 245 | 53.73% | 211 | 46.27% | 0 | 0.00% |
| 1976 | 229 | 43.54% | 276 | 52.47% | 21 | 3.99% |

== Geography ==
The county encompassed the northeast corner of the Pine Ridge Indian Reservation including the community of Wanblee. The eastern portion of the county was within the Rosebud Indian Reservation until 1911, when that part was annexed into the newly created Mellette County. By 1914, Washabaugh County's boundaries were expanded to include a portion of Washington County to the west and all of Jackson County south of the White River.

== Demographics ==
As an unorganized county lying entirely within two American Indian reservations, Washabaugh did not report separate population totals during the 1890, 1900, and 1910 censuses. Instead, population was included in the total population counts for the Pine Ridge and Rosebud reservations. The county started reporting separate population counts with the 1920 Census.

Washabaugh County Population by Year
| 1890 | 1900 | 1910 | 1920 | 1930 | 1940 | 1950 | 1960 | 1970 |
|---|---|---|---|---|---|---|---|---|
| | | | 1,166 | 2,474 | 1,980 | 1,551 | 1,042 | 1,389 |
