= 2020 United States presidential election in South Dakota =

- November 3, 2020
- Turnout: 73.88% (of registered voters) ▲4.27 pp 63.41% (of voting age population) ▲5.3 pp

Nominee	Donald Trump	Joe Biden
Party	Republican	Democratic
Home state	Florida	Delaware
Running mate	Mike Pence	Kamala Harris
Electoral vote	3	0
Popular vote	261,043	150,471
Percentage	61.77%	35.61%

Trump
40–50%
50–60%
60–70%
70–80%
80–90%
90–100%
Biden
40–50%
50–60%
60–70%
70–80%
80–90%
90–100%
Tie
President before election
Donald Trump
Republican
Elected President
Joe Biden
Democratic

The 2020 United States presidential election in South Dakota was held on Tuesday, November 3, 2020, as part of the 2020 United States presidential election in which all 50 states plus the District of Columbia participated. South Dakota voters chose electors to represent them in the Electoral College via a popular vote, pitting the Republican Party's nominee, incumbent President Donald Trump, and running mate Vice President Mike Pence against Democratic Party nominee, former Vice President Joe Biden, and his running mate California Senator Kamala Harris. South Dakota has three electoral votes in the Electoral College.

Trump carried South Dakota by 61.8%–35.6%, or a margin of 26.2%. Biden performed four points better than Hillary Clinton in 2016. Prior to the election, all 12 news organizations considered this a state Trump would win, or a safe red state. This was Libertarian Jo Jorgensen’s best state, with 2.63% of the vote.

== Primary elections ==
The primary elections were held on June 2, 2020.

=== Republican primary ===
Donald Trump ran unopposed in the Republican primary, and thus received all of the state's 29 delegates to the 2020 Republican National Convention.

=== Democratic primary ===
2020 South Dakota Democratic presidential primary
Candidate	Votes	%	Delegates
Joe Biden	40,800	77.48	13
Bernie Sanders (withdrawn)	11,861	22.52	3
Total	52,661	100%	16

=== Libertarian nominee ===
Prior to the South Dakota primaries, the 2020 Libertarian National Convention was held on May 22–24, 2020, selecting Jo Jorgensen, Psychology Senior Lecturer at Clemson University, as their presidential nominee.

== General election ==
=== Final predictions ===
Source	Ranking
The Cook Political Report	Solid R
Inside Elections	Solid R
Sabato's Crystal Ball	Safe R
Politico	Solid R
RCP	Solid R
Niskanen	Safe R
CNN	Solid R
The Economist	Safe R
CBS News	Likely R
270towin	Safe R
ABC News	Solid R
NPR	Likely R
NBC News	Solid R
538	Solid R

=== Polling ===
View source data.

Aggregate polls

Source of poll aggregation	Dates administered	Dates updated	Joe Biden Democratic	Donald Trump Republican	Other/ Undecided (Note: Calculated by taking the difference of 100% and all other candidates combined.)	Margin
270 to Win	October 17–25, 2020	November 3, 2020	42.0%	52.5%	5.5%	Trump +10.5
FiveThirtyEight	until November 2, 2020	November 3, 2020	39.0%	54.5%	6.5%	Trump +15.4
Average			40.5%	53.5%	6.0%	Trump +13.0

Polls

Poll source	Date(s) administered	Sample size (Note: Key: A – all adults RV – registered voters LV – likely voters V – unclear)	Margin of error	Donald Trump Republican	Joe Biden Democratic	Jo Jorgensen Libertarian	Other	Undecided
SurveyMonkey/Axios	Oct 20 – Nov 2, 2020	606 (LV)	± 5.5%	63% (Note: Overlapping sample with the previous SurveyMonkey/Axios poll, but more information available regarding sample size)	36%	–	–	–
Nielson Brothers Polling	Oct 24–28, 2020	484 (LV)	± 4.45%	55%	40%	3%	–	2%
SurveyMonkey/Axios	Oct 1–28, 2020	1,098 (LV)	–	57%	41%	–	–	–
Mason-Dixon	Oct 19–21, 2020	625 (LV)	± 4%	51%	40%	–	3%	6%
SurveyMonkey/Axios	Sep 1–30, 2020	354 (LV)	–	58%	41%	–	–	1%
SurveyMonkey/Axios	Aug 1–31, 2020	277 (LV)	–	59%	38%	–	–	3%
SurveyMonkey/Axios	Jul 1–31, 2020	396 (LV)	–	62%	35%	–	–	2%
SurveyMonkey/Axios	Jun 8–30, 2020	160 (LV)	–	61%	37%	–	–	2%

=== Electoral slates ===
These slates of electors were nominated by each party in order to vote in the Electoral College should their candidate win the state:

Donald Trump and Mike Pence Republican Party	Joe Biden and Kamala Harris Democratic Party	Jo Jorgensen and Spike Cohen Libertarian Party
Kristi Noem (Note: After her election, Noem was replaced by Dan Lederman.); Larry Rhoden; Jason Ravnsborg	Joseph M. Yracheta; Nicole A. Gronli; Randy Seiler	Devin Saxon; Tracey Quint; N/A

=== Results ===
2020 United States presidential election in South Dakota
Party	Candidate	Votes	%	±%
Republican	Donald Trump Mike Pence	261,043	61.77%	+0.24%
Democratic	Joe Biden Kamala Harris	150,471	35.61%	+3.87%
Libertarian	Jo Jorgensen Spike Cohen	11,095	2.63%	−3.00%
Total votes		422,609	100.00%	N/A

==== By county ====
County	Donald Trump Republican		Joe Biden Democratic		Jo Jorgensen Libertarian		Margin		Total
County	#	%	#	%	#	%	#	%	Total
Aurora	1,052	74.88%	317	22.56%	36	2.56%	735	52.31%	1,405
Beadle	4,808	67.90%	2,107	29.76%	166	2.34%	2,701	38.14%	7,081
Bennett	694	58.66%	466	39.39%	23	1.94%	228	19.27%	1,183
Bon Homme	2,235	74.48%	721	24.03%	45	1.50%	1,514	50.45%	3,001
Brookings	8,000	54.92%	6,110	41.94%	457	3.14%	1,890	12.97%	14,567
Brown	10,580	60.30%	6,538	37.26%	429	2.44%	4,042	23.04%	17,547
Brule	1,750	70.28%	673	27.03%	67	2.69%	1,077	43.25%	2,490
Buffalo	183	33.33%	352	64.12%	14	2.55%	-169	-30.78%	549
Butte	3,731	77.70%	939	19.55%	132	2.75%	2,792	58.14%	4,802
Campbell	747	85.57%	117	13.40%	9	1.03%	630	72.16%	873
Charles Mix	2,552	67.46%	1,177	31.11%	54	1.43%	1,375	36.35%	3,783
Clark	1,373	74.22%	437	23.62%	40	2.16%	936	50.59%	1,850
Clay	2,456	43.10%	3,083	54.11%	159	2.79%	-627	-11.00%	5,698
Codington	8,958	68.06%	3,837	29.15%	366	2.78%	5,121	38.91%	13,161
Corson	647	50.43%	622	48.48%	14	1.09%	25	1.95%	1,283
Custer	3,852	70.11%	1,522	27.70%	120	2.18%	2,330	42.41%	5,494
Davison	5,613	66.39%	2,648	31.32%	193	2.28%	2,965	35.07%	8,454
Day	1,869	63.06%	1,052	35.49%	43	1.45%	817	27.56%	2,964
Deuel	1,699	72.30%	609	25.91%	42	1.79%	1,090	46.38%	2,350
Dewey	790	40.18%	1,131	57.53%	45	2.29%	-341	-17.34%	1,966
Douglas	1,468	86.00%	216	12.65%	23	1.35%	1,252	73.35%	1,707
Edmunds	1,538	77.48%	417	21.01%	30	1.51%	1,121	56.47%	1,985
Fall River	2,878	71.20%	1,053	26.05%	111	2.75%	1,825	45.15%	4,042
Faulk	964	81.56%	198	16.75%	20	1.69%	766	64.81%	1,182
Grant	2,618	69.91%	1,056	28.20%	71	1.90%	1,562	41.71%	3,745
Gregory	1,771	78.43%	455	20.15%	32	1.42%	1,316	58.28%	2,258
Haakon	1,026	90.24%	105	9.23%	6	0.53%	921	81.00%	1,137
Hamlin	2,372	76.94%	647	20.99%	64	2.08%	1,725	55.95%	3,083
Hand	1,433	78.05%	373	20.32%	30	1.63%	1,060	57.73%	1,836
Hanson	1,793	75.08%	557	23.32%	38	1.59%	1,236	51.76%	2,388
Harding	748	92.00%	49	6.03%	16	1.97%	699	85.98%	813
Hughes	5,522	63.30%	2,953	33.85%	248	2.84%	2,569	29.45%	8,723
Hutchinson	2,944	78.15%	762	20.23%	61	1.62%	2,182	57.92%	3,767
Hyde	564	79.44%	136	19.15%	10	1.41%	428	60.28%	710
Jackson	738	66.19%	359	32.20%	18	1.61%	379	33.99%	1,115
Jerauld	721	71.67%	270	26.84%	15	1.49%	451	44.83%	1,006
Jones	498	83.14%	90	15.03%	11	1.84%	408	68.11%	599
Kingsbury	1,904	68.51%	819	29.47%	56	2.02%	1,085	39.04%	2,779
Lake	3,681	62.68%	2,068	35.21%	124	2.11%	1,613	27.46%	5,873
Lawrence	8,753	63.30%	4,537	32.81%	538	3.89%	4,216	30.49%	13,828
Lincoln	19,617	60.55%	11,981	36.98%	798	2.46%	7,636	23.57%	32,396
Lyman	1,042	65.25%	525	32.87%	30	1.88%	517	32.37%	1,597
Marshall	1,287	59.09%	858	39.39%	33	1.52%	429	19.70%	2,178
McCook	2,068	71.31%	769	26.52%	63	2.17%	1,299	44.79%	2,900
McPherson	1,075	81.19%	222	16.77%	27	2.04%	853	64.43%	1,324
Meade	9,875	72.24%	3,285	24.03%	510	3.73%	6,590	48.21%	13,670
Mellette	449	58.39%	298	38.75%	22	2.86%	151	19.64%	769
Miner	787	69.16%	320	28.12%	31	2.72%	467	41.04%	1,138
Minnehaha	49,249	53.34%	40,482	43.85%	2,595	2.81%	8,767	9.50%	92,326
Moody	1,951	60.85%	1,179	36.77%	76	2.37%	772	24.08%	3,206
Oglala Lakota	297	9.28%	2,829	88.41%	74	2.31%	-2,532	-79.13%	3,200
Pennington	35,063	60.96%	20,606	35.83%	1,849	3.21%	14,457	25.13%	57,518
Perkins	1,401	83.94%	239	14.32%	29	1.74%	1,162	69.62%	1,669
Potter	1,139	82.54%	227	16.45%	14	1.01%	912	66.09%	1,380
Roberts	2,404	55.82%	1,828	42.44%	75	1.74%	576	13.37%	4,307
Sanborn	905	76.37%	257	21.69%	23	1.94%	648	54.68%	1,185
Spink	2,104	66.52%	998	31.55%	61	1.93%	1,106	34.97%	3,163
Stanley	1,203	72.82%	421	25.48%	28	1.69%	782	47.34%	1,652
Sully	726	78.06%	185	19.89%	19	2.04%	541	58.17%	930
Todd	532	20.95%	1,963	77.31%	44	1.73%	-1,431	-56.36%	2,539
Tripp	2,161	80.16%	495	18.36%	40	1.48%	1,666	61.80%	2,696
Turner	3,290	72.34%	1,139	25.04%	119	2.62%	2,151	47.30%	4,548
Union	5,944	67.13%	2,725	30.77%	186	2.10%	3,219	36.35%	8,855
Walworth	1,966	76.20%	565	21.90%	49	1.90%	1,401	54.30%	2,580
Yankton	6,581	60.38%	4,016	36.84%	303	2.78%	2,565	23.53%	10,900
Ziebach	404	44.59%	481	53.09%	21	2.32%	-77	-8.50%	906
Totals	261,043	61.77%	150,471	35.61%	11,095	2.63%	110,572	26.16%	422,609

Counties that flipped from Republican to Democratic

- Ziebach (largest municipality: Dupree)

==== By congressional district ====
South Dakota has only one congressional district because of its small population compared to other states. This district, called the at-large district because it covers the entire state, is equivalent to the statewide election results.

District	Trump	Biden	Representative
At-large	61.77%	35.61%	Dusty Johnson

== Analysis ==
South Dakota, a majority-White, mainly-rural state in the Midwestern Plains, is normally a Republican stronghold at both the state and presidential levels, while being more populated than—and voting to the left of—neighboring North Dakota. It hasn't voted for a Democratic presidential candidate since Lyndon B. Johnson carried it in 1964, against the backdrop of his nationwide landslide victory. It has only been competitive (within 5 points of a Democratic victory) in three elections since then: 1976, 1992, and 1996, all elections the Democratic nominee won. Even South Dakota Senator George McGovern failed to carry his home state as Democratic nominee in the Republican landslide of 1972.

Despite Trump's win in the state, Biden flipped majority-Native American Ziebach County back to Democratic after it flipped red in 2016. Meanwhile, Trump held the majority-Native American counties of Bennett, Mellette and Jackson, and grew his support in Corson County, particularly in white-majority precincts while Biden held on to Native American support in other majority-minority precincts in the state. Per exit polls by the Associated Press, Trump won 63% of White Americans, a group composing 94% of the electorate. A sparsely populated state with a rural and conservative lifestyle, South Dakota has an agrarian populist streak to which Trump made direct appeals. He campaigned personally in the state, using Mount Rushmore as a backdrop to cast himself as waging battle against a "new far-left fascism".

While Biden did not win Minnehaha County, home to the state's largest city, Sioux Falls, that Barack Obama carried by less than one percent in 2008, he reduced Trump's 2016 14.6-percent winning margin in the county to 9.4 points, although Trump received a higher percentage of votes in the county than Mitt Romney did in 2012. Biden became the first Democrat to win the White House without carrying Roberts County since Woodrow Wilson in 1916, as well as the first to do so without carrying Day County since Franklin D. Roosevelt in 1944, and the first to do so without carrying Marshall County since John F. Kennedy in 1960.

== See also ==
- Presidency of Joe Biden
- United States presidential elections in South Dakota
- 2020 United States presidential election
- 2020 Democratic Party presidential primaries
- 2020 Libertarian Party presidential primaries
- 2020 Republican Party presidential primaries
- 2020 United States elections
