= Daniel Washabaugh =

American politician (1803–1894)

Daniel Washabaugh (October 17, 1803 – January 10, 1894) was an American legislator and public official.

Born near Hagerstown, Maryland, Washabaugh moved to Chambersburg, Pennsylvania and then to Bedford, Pennsylvania. He served in the Pennsylvania House of Representatives as a Whig in 1841. He also served as a prothonotary for Bedford County, Pennsylvania. He died in Everett, Pennsylvania. His son was Frank J. Washabaugh who was a South Dakota legislator and jurist.
