= South Dakota Special Tax Division =

The Department of Liquor Control is a South Dakota state government agency which is responsible for licensing certain operations and for collecting certain state taxes. These taxes include cigarette excise, estate, bank franchise, ore, energy mineral severance, coin-operated laundromat license fees, beer, wine and distilled spirits, gaming excise, beer and liquor license fees, and alcohol beverage brand registration fees. It is also responsible for the sales and property tax refund program for the elderly and disabled.

== See also ==
- South Dakota v. Wayfair, Inc.
