= Frank J. Washabaugh =

American politician and jurist

Frank J. Washabaugh (July 2, 1849 – May 29, 1902) was an American politician and jurist.

== Career ==
Born in Bedford, Pennsylvania, he graduated from Lafayette College. His father Daniel Washabaugh served in the Pennsylvania General Assembly. He then moved to Yankton, Dakota Territory and then to Rapid City, Dakota Territory where he practiced law. In 1882, Washabaugh was elected to the Dakota Territorial Council. In 1889, Washabaugh was elected to the South Dakota State Senate from Deadwood, South Dakota, as a Republican. In 1898, he was elected county judge for Lawrence County, South Dakota. He died in Baltimore, Maryland where he had gone for medical treatment.

== Legacy ==
The former Washabaugh County, South Dakota was named after Frank J. Washabaugh.
