= Sully County, South Dakota =

County in South Dakota, United States

- County
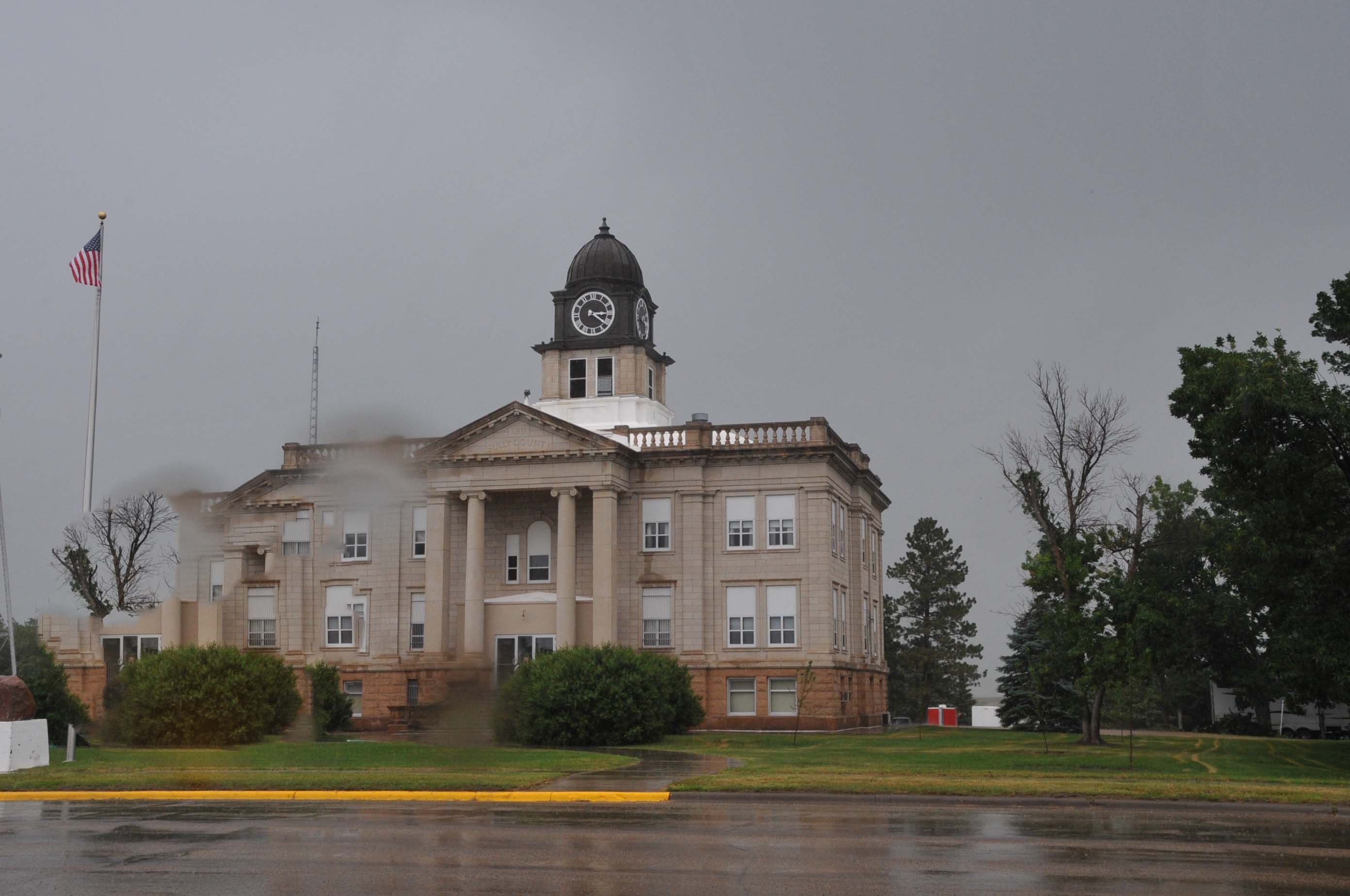
- Sully Courthouse (2013)

- Location within the U.S. state of South Dakota
- Coordinates: 44°43′20.37″N 100°07′53.036″W
- Country: United States
- State: South Dakota
- Created: 1873
- Organized: 1883
- Named for: Alfred Sully
- Seat: Onida
- Largest city: Onida

Area
  - Total: 1,070 sq mi (2,800 km^{2})
  - Land: 1,007 sq mi (2,610 km^{2})
  - Water: 63 sq mi (160 km^{2}) 5.9%

Population (2020)
  - Total: 1,446
  - Estimate (2025): 1,479 ▲
  - Density: 1.436/sq mi (0.5544/km^{2})
- Time zone: UTC−6 (Central)
  - Summer (DST): UTC−5 (CDT)
- Congressional district: At-large
- Website: sully.sdcounty.gov

Sully County is a county in the U.S. state of South Dakota. As of the 2020 census, the population was 1,446, making it the fifth-least populous county in South Dakota. Its county seat is Onida. The county was created in 1873 and organized in 1883. It is named after General Alfred Sully, who built Fort Sully.

Sully County is included in the Micropolitan Statistical Area of Pierre.

Sully County was the location of the largest African American homesteader settlement in the state, the Blair Colony. An Illinois man named Norvel Blair arrived in Fairbank Township in 1884, after sending his sons Benjamin and Patrick to investigate the area for settlement. Blair's financial success, achieved through farming and breeding racehorses, attracted dozens of other Black families to the colony. Blair became the first Black South Dakotan to serve on a school board.

The decline of South Dakota agriculture during the Great Depression led most Blair Colony residents to seek work in larger cities like Minneapolis and Chicago. A historical marker in the county seat of Onida remembers the colony.

== Geography ==
The west boundary line of Sully County is defined by the meanderings of the Missouri River, which flows southward along its edge. The county's terrain is composed of semi-arid rolling hills, partially devoted to agriculture. The terrain slopes to the south and east, but the west portion of the county slopes westward into the river valley. The county's highest point is along the midpoint of its north boundary line, at 1,949 ft (594 m) ASL. The county has a total area of 1,070 square miles (2,800 km^{2}), of which 1,007 square miles (2,610 km^{2}) is land and 63 square miles (160 km^{2}) (5.9%) is water.

The eastern portion of South Dakota's counties (48 of 66) observe Central Time; the western counties (18 of 66) observe Mountain Time. Sully County is at the western edge of those counties that observe Central Time.

=== Major highways ===
- U.S. Highway 83
- South Dakota Highway 1804

=== Adjacent counties ===
- Potter County – north
- Hyde County – east
- Hughes County – south
- Stanley County – southwest (observes mountain time)
- Dewey County – northwest (observes Mountain Time)

=== Protected areas ===
- Bush's Landing State Lakeside Use Area
- Cottonwood Lake State Game Production Area
- Cow Creek State Game Production Area
- Cow Creek State Recreation Area
- Elk State Game Production Area
- Fort Sully State Game Production Area
- Hofer State Game Production Area
- Koenig State Game Production Area Area
- Lambrecht State Game Production Area
- Lake State Game Production Area
- Little Bend State Game Production Area
- Little Bend State Lakeside Use Area Area
- Mail Shack State Game Production Area
- Medicine Knoll Creek State Game Production Area
- Okobojo Creek State Game Production Area
- Okobojo Point State Recreation Area
- Onida State Game Production Area
- Pleasant State Game Production Area
- Spring Creek Recreation Area
- Stone Lake State Game Production Area
- Sutton Bay State Game Production Area
- Sutton Bay State Lakeside Use Area

=== Lakes ===
- Cottonwood Lake
- Mundt Lake
- Fuller Lake
- Lake Oahe (part)
- Lake Okobojo
- Stone Lake
- Sully Lake
- Walker Lake
- Warnes Slough

== Demographics ==
Historical population
Census	Pop.	Note	%±
1880	296		—
1890	2,412		714.9%
1900	1,715		−28.9%
1910	2,462		43.6%
1920	2,831		15.0%
1930	3,852		36.1%
1940	2,668		−30.7%
1950	2,713		1.7%
1960	2,607		−3.9%
1970	2,362		−9.4%
1980	1,990		−15.7%
1990	1,589		−20.2%
2000	1,556		−2.1%
2010	1,373		−11.8%
2020	1,446		5.3%
2025 (est.)	1,479	▲	2.3%
U.S. Decennial Census; 1790–1960 1900–1990; 1990–2000 2010–2020

=== 2020 census ===
As of the 2020 census, there were 1,446 people, 635 households, and 428 families residing in the county. The population density was 1.4 inhabitants per square mile (0.54/km^{2}).

Of the residents, 21.2% were under the age of 18 and 22.2% were 65 years of age or older; the median age was 45.4 years. For every 100 females there were 112.0 males, and for every 100 females age 18 and over there were 111.1 males.

The racial makeup of the county was 93.4% White, 0.3% Black or African American, 0.7% American Indian and Alaska Native, 0.4% Asian, 0.6% from some other race, and 4.6% from two or more races. Hispanic or Latino residents of any race comprised 2.9% of the population.

There were 635 households in the county, of which 28.7% had children under the age of 18 living with them and 14.0% had a female householder with no spouse or partner present. About 26.8% of all households were made up of individuals and 12.1% had someone living alone who was 65 years of age or older.

There were 892 housing units, of which 28.8% were vacant. Among occupied housing units, 81.9% were owner-occupied and 18.1% were renter-occupied. The homeowner vacancy rate was 0.2% and the rental vacancy rate was 24.8%.

=== 2010 census ===
As of the 2010 census, there were 1,373 people, 610 households, and 397 families in the county. The population density was 1.4 inhabitants per square mile (0.54/km^{2}). There were 845 housing units at an average density of 0.84 units per square mile (0.32 units/km^{2}). The racial makeup of the county was 96.6% white, 1.2% American Indian, 0.1% black or African American, 0.0% from other races, and 2.2% from two or more races. Those of Hispanic or Latino origin made up 0.9% of the population. In terms of ancestry,

Of the 610 households, 27.0% had children under the age of 18 living with them, 57.5% were married couples living together, 4.6% had a female householder with no husband present, 34.9% were non-families, and 31.6% of all households were made up of individuals. The average household size was 2.25 and the average family size was 2.82. The median age was 46.6 years.

The median income for a household in the county was $48,958 and the median income for a family was $58,875. Males had a median income of $34,375 versus $29,087 for females. The per capita income for the county was $26,596. About 4.4% of families and 8.0% of the population were below the poverty line, including 12.8% of those under age 18 and 8.4% of those age 65 or over.

== Communities ==
=== City ===
- Onida (county seat)

=== Town ===
- Agar

=== Census-designated place ===
- Cow Creek

=== Unorganized territories ===
The county organization does not include division into townships. Its area is divided into two areas of unorganized territory: West Sully and East Sully.

== Politics ==
Throughout its history, Sully County has been powerfully Republican. The solitary Democrat to carry Sully County at a Presidential level has been Franklin D. Roosevelt in 1932 during an election heavily influenced by the "Dust Bowl" and Great Depression. Nonetheless, in the following 1936 election, Alf Landon won the county by over twenty percent. Since that time, the Democratic Party has bettered FDR's 1936 effort five times, but only Lyndon Johnson in 1964 has held the GOP to a single-digit margin. In modern times, like almost all of rural America, Sully County has become more and more Republican. The last Democrat to carry one-third of the county's vote was Michael Dukakis in 1988 during an election severely affected by a major drought.

United States presidential election results for Sully County, South Dakota
Year	Republican		Democratic		Third party(ies)	
Year	No.	%	No.	%	No.	%
1892	278	57.44%	39	8.06%	167	34.50%
1896	262	56.34%	198	42.58%	5	1.08%
1900	294	64.76%	152	33.48%	8	1.76%
1904	364	82.92%	50	11.39%	25	5.69%
1908	368	68.27%	154	28.57%	17	3.15%
1912	0	0.00%	242	42.31%	330	57.69%
1916	281	50.45%	268	48.11%	8	1.44%
1920	542	62.95%	147	17.07%	172	19.98%
1924	555	59.04%	138	14.68%	247	26.28%
1928	999	70.50%	415	29.29%	3	0.21%
1932	559	35.63%	961	61.25%	49	3.12%
1936	667	58.61%	437	38.40%	34	2.99%
1940	840	64.71%	458	35.29%	0	0.00%
1944	612	67.11%	300	32.89%	0	0.00%
1948	579	58.37%	405	40.83%	8	0.81%
1952	860	70.96%	352	29.04%	0	0.00%
1956	726	59.51%	494	40.49%	0	0.00%
1960	864	64.14%	483	35.86%	0	0.00%
1964	667	52.81%	596	47.19%	0	0.00%
1968	676	60.09%	356	31.64%	93	8.27%
1972	773	64.90%	414	34.76%	4	0.34%
1976	630	55.31%	505	44.34%	4	0.35%
1980	852	74.15%	220	19.15%	77	6.70%
1984	836	75.52%	266	24.03%	5	0.45%
1988	571	56.76%	393	39.07%	42	4.17%
1992	565	55.94%	273	27.03%	172	17.03%
1996	592	57.76%	321	31.32%	112	10.93%
2000	633	72.68%	209	24.00%	29	3.33%
2004	702	76.55%	201	21.92%	14	1.53%
2008	581	69.75%	233	27.97%	19	2.28%
2012	613	74.94%	186	22.74%	19	2.32%
2016	679	78.86%	137	15.91%	45	5.23%
2020	726	78.06%	185	19.89%	19	2.04%
2024	716	79.47%	168	18.65%	17	1.89%

== Notable person ==
- Irwin Gunsalus (1912–2008), biochemist, was born in Sully County.

== See also ==
- National Register of Historic Places listings in Sully County, South Dakota
