= Herman Malchow =

American politician

Herman Malchow was an American politician who served as a member of the South Dakota House of Representatives from 1893 to 1894. He represented Potter County, South Dakota, where he resided.
