= Horse Creek, South Dakota =

- Census-designated place
- Location within South Dakota Location within the United States
- Coordinates: 43°32′17″N 100°44′17″W
- Country: United States
- State: South Dakota
- County: Mellette

Area
  - Total: 0.95 sq mi (2.46 km^{2})
  - Land: 0.95 sq mi (2.46 km^{2})
  - Water: 0 sq mi (0.00 km^{2})
- Elevation: 2,005 ft (611 m)

Population (2020)
  - Total: 187
  - Density: 196.8/sq mi (75.99/km^{2})
- Time zone: UTC-7 (Mountain (MST))
  - Summer (DST): UTC-6 (MDT)
- ZIP Code: 57579 (White River)
- Area code: 605
- FIPS code: 46-30056
- GNIS feature ID: 2813051

Horse Creek is an unincorporated community and census-designated place (CDP) in Mellette County, South Dakota, United States. It was first listed as a CDP prior to the 2020 census. The population of the CDP was 187 at the 2020 census.

It is in the central part of the county, 2 miles (3 km) south of White River, the county seat. The Little White River flows from north to south through the CDP, with most of the community's development to the east of the river on high ground.

U.S. Route 83 runs along the eastern edge of the CDP, leading north through White River 25 miles (40 km) to Interstate 90 at Murdo and south 20 miles (32 km) to Mission. South Dakota Highway 44 leads east-southeast from the CDP 52 miles (84 km) to Winner. Highway 44 follows US 83 north to White River, then turns west and leads 77 miles (124 km) to Interior, near Badlands National Park.

== Demographics ==
Historical population
| Census | Pop. | Note | %± |
|---|---|---|---|
| 2020 | 187 | | — |
U.S. Decennial Census
