= 1964 United States presidential election in South Dakota =

- November 3, 1964

Nominee	Lyndon B. Johnson	Barry Goldwater
Party	Democratic	Republican
Home state	Texas	Arizona
Running mate	Hubert Humphrey	William E. Miller
Electoral vote	4	0
Popular vote	163,010	130,108
Percentage	55.61%	44.39%
County results
Johnson
50–60%
60–70%
70–80%
Goldwater
50–60%
70–80%
President before election
Lyndon B. Johnson
Democratic
Elected President
Lyndon B. Johnson
Democratic

The 1964 United States presidential election in South Dakota took place on November 3, 1964, as part of the 1964 United States presidential election. Voters chose four representatives, or electors, to the Electoral College, who voted for president and vice president.

South Dakota was won by incumbent President Lyndon B. Johnson (D–Texas), with 55.61 percent of the popular vote, against Senator Barry Goldwater (R–Arizona), with 44.39% of the popular vote. As of 2024, this is the only presidential race since 1936 where South Dakota voted Democratic (although it nearly did so in 1976 for Jimmy Carter), as well as the last time a Democrat won any of the following counties: Pennington, Lincoln, Meade, Yankton, Custer, Bennett, Clark, Hamlin, Hand, Hyde, Jackson, Jones, Lyman, Mellette, Potter, Stanley, Tripp, and Walworth. This is also the last time that South Dakota voted more Republican than North Dakota, and the last of only 5 times since statehood that South Dakota voted against the Republican presidential nominee.

== Results ==
1964 United States presidential election in South Dakota
Party	Candidate	Votes	%
Democratic	Lyndon B. Johnson (inc.)	163,010	55.61%
Republican	Barry Goldwater	130,108	44.39%
Total votes		293,118	100%

=== Results by county ===
County	Lyndon B. Johnson Democratic		Barry Goldwater Republican		Margin		Total votes cast
County	#	%	#	%	#	%	Total votes cast
Aurora	1,555	64.10%	871	35.90%	684	28.20%	2,426
Beadle	5,968	59.57%	4,051	40.43%	1,917	19.14%	10,019
Bennett	775	55.40%	624	44.60%	151	10.80%	1,399
Bon Homme	2,494	58.30%	1,784	41.70%	710	16.60%	4,278
Brookings	4,191	53.17%	3,692	46.83%	499	6.34%	7,883
Brown	9,107	62.24%	5,524	37.76%	3,583	24.48%	14,631
Brule	2,205	69.49%	968	30.51%	1,237	38.98%	3,173
Buffalo	501	64.31%	278	35.69%	223	28.62%	779
Butte	1,863	49.81%	1,877	50.19%	-14	-0.38%	3,740
Campbell	411	26.13%	1,162	73.87%	-751	-47.74%	1,573
Charles Mix	3,488	68.22%	1,625	31.78%	1,863	36.44%	5,113
Clark	1,771	53.96%	1,511	46.04%	260	7.92%	3,282
Clay	2,599	59.05%	1,802	40.95%	797	18.10%	4,401
Codington	5,353	59.84%	3,593	40.16%	1,760	19.68%	8,946
Corson	1,328	56.22%	1,034	43.78%	294	12.44%	2,362
Custer	1,176	50.73%	1,142	49.27%	34	1.46%	2,318
Davison	4,861	63.54%	2,789	36.46%	2,072	27.08%	7,650
Day	3,235	62.83%	1,914	37.17%	1,321	25.66%	5,149
Deuel	1,524	53.64%	1,317	46.36%	207	7.28%	2,841
Dewey	1,259	56.21%	981	43.79%	278	12.42%	2,240
Douglas	1,149	49.14%	1,189	50.86%	-40	-1.72%	2,338
Edmunds	1,708	54.22%	1,442	45.78%	266	8.44%	3,150
Fall River	1,706	45.71%	2,026	54.29%	-320	-8.58%	3,732
Faulk	1,225	55.71%	974	44.29%	251	11.42%	2,199
Grant	2,583	58.22%	1,854	41.78%	729	16.44%	4,437
Gregory	1,995	54.82%	1,644	45.18%	351	9.64%	3,639
Haakon	662	45.44%	795	54.56%	-133	-9.12%	1,457
Hamlin	1,561	50.58%	1,525	49.42%	36	1.16%	3,086
Hand	1,563	51.60%	1,466	48.40%	97	3.20%	3,029
Hanson	1,232	60.57%	802	39.43%	430	21.14%	2,034
Harding	487	49.90%	489	50.10%	-2	-0.20%	976
Hughes	2,606	48.82%	2,732	51.18%	-126	-2.36%	5,338
Hutchinson	2,189	43.15%	2,884	56.85%	-695	-13.70%	5,073
Hyde	736	52.50%	666	47.50%	70	5.00%	1,402
Jackson	480	51.72%	448	48.28%	32	3.44%	928
Jerauld	999	53.83%	857	46.17%	142	7.66%	1,856
Jones	548	56.91%	415	43.09%	133	13.82%	963
Kingsbury	2,005	48.54%	2,126	51.46%	-121	-2.92%	4,131
Lake	2,988	55.28%	2,417	44.72%	571	10.56%	5,405
Lawrence	3,468	48.09%	3,743	51.91%	-275	-3.82%	7,211
Lincoln	2,836	50.86%	2,740	49.14%	96	1.72%	5,576
Lyman	1,057	55.08%	862	44.92%	195	10.16%	1,919
Marshall	2,063	63.56%	1,183	36.44%	880	27.12%	3,246
McCook	2,181	55.40%	1,756	44.60%	425	10.80%	3,937
McPherson	723	27.66%	1,891	72.34%	-1,168	-44.68%	2,614
Meade	2,323	52.05%	2,140	47.95%	183	4.10%	4,463
Mellette	658	55.62%	525	44.38%	133	11.24%	1,183
Miner	1,679	63.99%	945	36.01%	734	27.98%	2,624
Minnehaha	20,929	55.52%	16,766	44.48%	4,163	11.04%	37,695
Moody	2,301	61.16%	1,461	38.84%	840	22.32%	3,762
Pennington	9,881	52.54%	8,926	47.46%	955	5.08%	18,807
Perkins	1,255	47.11%	1,409	52.89%	-154	-5.78%	2,664
Potter	1,260	56.91%	954	43.09%	306	13.82%	2,214
Roberts	3,567	64.88%	1,931	35.12%	1,636	29.76%	5,498
Sanborn	1,401	60.57%	912	39.43%	489	21.14%	2,313
Shannon	1,748	75.84%	557	24.16%	1,191	51.68%	2,305
Spink	3,120	61.50%	1,953	38.50%	1,167	23.00%	5,073
Stanley	750	57.74%	549	42.26%	201	15.48%	1,299
Sully	596	47.19%	667	52.81%	-71	-5.62%	1,263
Todd	1,274	63.80%	723	36.20%	551	27.60%	1,997
Tripp	2,241	53.64%	1,937	46.36%	304	7.28%	4,178
Turner	2,184	43.42%	2,846	56.58%	-662	-13.16%	5,030
Union	2,828	62.09%	1,727	37.91%	1,101	24.18%	4,555
Walworth	1,952	51.35%	1,849	48.65%	103	2.70%	3,801
Washabaugh	348	62.25%	211	37.75%	137	24.50%	559
Yankton	3,747	53.87%	3,208	46.13%	539	7.74%	6,955
Ziebach	554	55.34%	447	44.66%	107	10.68%	1,001
Totals	163,010	55.61%	130,108	44.39%	32,902	11.22%	293,118

==== Counties that flipped from Republican to Democratic ====
- Beadle
- Bennett
- Bon Homme
- Brookings
- Brown
- Clark
- Clay
- Codington
- Corson
- Custer
- Deuel
- Dewey
- Edmunds
- Faulk
- Grant
- Gregory
- Hamlin
- Hand
- Hyde
- Jackson
- Jerauld
- Jones
- Lake
- Lincoln
- Lyman
- Marshall
- McCook
- Meade
- Mellette
- Miner
- Minnehaha
- Moody
- Pennington
- Potter
- Sanborn
- Spink
- Todd
- Tripp
- Union
- Walworth
- Washabaugh
- Yankton
- Ziebach

== See also ==
- United States presidential elections in South Dakota
