= Cow Creek, South Dakota =

- Unincorporated community
- Location within South Dakota Location within the United States
- Coordinates: 44°33′14″N 100°28′31″W
- Country: United States
- State: South Dakota
- County: Sully

Area
  - Total: 1.84 sq mi (4.76 km^{2})
  - Land: 1.84 sq mi (4.76 km^{2})
  - Water: 0 sq mi (0.00 km^{2})
- Elevation: 1,650 ft (500 m)

Population (2020)
  - Total: 52
  - Density: 28.3/sq mi (10.93/km^{2})
- Time zone: UTC-6 (Central (CST))
  - Summer (DST): UTC-5 (CDT)
- Area code: 605
- GNIS feature ID: 2584551

Cow Creek is an unincorporated community and census-designated place in Sully County, South Dakota, United States. As of the 2020 census, Cow Creek had a population of 52. The community is located on the eastern shore of Lake Oahe.

== Geography ==
According to the U.S. Census Bureau, the community has an area of 1.831 square miles (4.74 km^{2}), all land.

== Demographics ==
Historical population
Census	Pop.	Note	%±
2020	52		—
U.S. Decennial Census
