= 1936 United States presidential election in South Dakota =

- November 3, 1936

Nominee	Franklin D. Roosevelt	Alf Landon
Party	Democratic	Republican
Home state	New York	Kansas
Running mate	John Nance Garner	Frank Knox
Electoral vote	4	0
Popular vote	160,137	125,977
Percentage	54.02%	42.49%
County results
Roosevelt
40–50%
50–60%
60–70%
Landon
40–50%
50–60%
60–70%

The 1936 United States presidential election in South Dakota took place on November 3, 1936, as part of the 1936 United States presidential election. Voters chose four representatives, or electors to the Electoral College, who voted for president and vice president.

South Dakota voted for the Democratic candidate Franklin D. Roosevelt over Republican candidate Alf Landon. Roosevelt won the state by a margin of 11.53%. As of the 2024 presidential election, this is the last occasion when the following counties have voted for a Democratic presidential candidate: Douglas, Fall River, Haakon, Harding, Hughes and Perkins. Roosevelt remains the only Democrat in history to carry the state twice, and this is the only time in history that South Dakota has voted Democratic in two consecutive presidential races.

== Primary elections ==
=== Democratic primary ===
Incumbent President Franklin D. Roosevelt ran unopposed in the Democratic primary, held on May 5, 1936.

1936 South Dakota Democratic Primary - Results
Candidate	Votes	Percentage	Delegates
Franklin D. Roosevelt	48,262	100.00%	8
Total	48,262	100.00%	8

=== Republican primary ===
U.S. Senator William Borah from Idaho and former South Dakota Governor Warren E. Green (leading a "No Preference" delegate list) faced off in the Republican primary, held on May 5, 1936.

1936 South Dakota Republican Primary - Results
Candidate	Votes	Percentage	Delegates
Warren E. Green/No Preference	44,518	50.14%	8
William Borah	44,261	49.86%	0
Total	88,779	100.00%	8

== Results ==
The general election was held on November 3, 1936. Armstrong County did not participate.

1936 United States presidential election in South Dakota
Party	Candidate	Running mate	Votes	%	Electoral votes
Democratic	Franklin D. Roosevelt	John Nance Garner	160,137	54.02%	4
Republican	Alf Landon	Frank Knox	125,977	42.49%	0
Independent	William Lemke	Thomas C. O'Brien	10,338	3.49%	0
Total			296,452	100.0%	4

=== Results by county ===
County	Franklin D. Roosevelt Democratic		Alf Landon Republican		William Lemke Independent		Margin		Total votes cast
County	#	%	#	%	#	%	#	%	Total votes cast
Aurora	1,801	60.78%	1,082	36.52%	80	2.70%	719	24.27%	2,963
Beadle	5,843	64.84%	2,965	32.90%	203	2.25%	2,878	31.94%	9,011
Bennett	807	59.82%	530	39.29%	12	0.89%	277	20.53%	1,349
Bon Homme	2,959	55.84%	2,236	42.20%	104	1.96%	723	13.64%	5,299
Brookings	3,161	43.29%	3,899	53.40%	242	3.31%	-738	-10.11%	7,302
Brown	9,177	65.58%	4,505	32.19%	311	2.22%	4,672	33.39%	13,993
Brule	2,274	68.56%	982	29.61%	61	1.84%	1,292	38.95%	3,317
Buffalo	410	51.57%	368	46.29%	17	2.14%	42	5.28%	795
Butte	1,519	48.30%	1,525	48.49%	101	3.21%	-6	-0.19%	3,145
Campbell	736	36.31%	1,236	60.98%	55	2.71%	-500	-24.67%	2,027
Charles Mix	4,628	66.96%	2,209	31.96%	75	1.09%	2,419	35.00%	6,912
Clark	2,036	49.82%	1,883	46.07%	168	4.11%	153	3.74%	4,087
Clay	3,070	60.97%	1,692	33.60%	273	5.42%	1,378	27.37%	5,035
Codington	4,256	55.85%	3,005	39.44%	359	4.71%	1,251	16.42%	7,620
Corson	1,781	54.05%	1,408	42.73%	106	3.22%	373	11.32%	3,295
Custer	1,519	52.16%	1,365	46.88%	28	0.96%	154	5.29%	2,912
Davison	4,983	63.84%	2,510	32.16%	312	4.00%	2,473	31.68%	7,805
Day	3,335	58.21%	2,113	36.88%	281	4.90%	1,222	21.33%	5,729
Deuel	1,440	45.67%	1,595	50.59%	118	3.74%	-155	-4.92%	3,153
Dewey	1,216	53.17%	1,012	44.25%	59	2.58%	204	8.92%	2,287
Douglas	1,680	53.01%	1,418	44.75%	71	2.24%	262	8.27%	3,169
Edmunds	2,030	52.21%	1,818	46.76%	40	1.03%	212	5.45%	3,888
Fall River	1,927	48.39%	1,876	47.11%	179	4.50%	51	1.28%	3,982
Faulk	1,404	54.95%	1,111	43.48%	40	1.57%	293	11.47%	2,555
Grant	2,101	51.76%	1,847	45.50%	111	2.73%	254	6.26%	4,059
Gregory	2,603	57.27%	1,868	41.10%	74	1.63%	735	16.17%	4,545
Haakon	948	48.47%	933	47.70%	75	3.83%	15	0.77%	1,956
Hamlin	1,622	45.64%	1,857	52.25%	75	2.11%	-235	-6.61%	3,554
Hand	1,721	53.17%	1,289	39.82%	227	7.01%	432	13.35%	3,237
Hanson	1,530	56.50%	1,090	40.25%	88	3.25%	440	16.25%	2,708
Harding	819	59.26%	524	37.92%	39	2.82%	295	21.35%	1,382
Hughes	1,662	50.18%	1,547	46.71%	103	3.11%	115	3.47%	3,312
Hutchinson	2,500	43.10%	2,804	48.34%	497	8.57%	-304	-5.24%	5,801
Hyde	683	45.11%	795	52.51%	36	2.38%	-112	-7.40%	1,514
Jackson	593	53.71%	481	43.57%	30	2.72%	112	10.14%	1,104
Jerauld	1,343	53.63%	1,075	42.93%	86	3.43%	268	10.70%	2,504
Jones	620	49.05%	608	48.10%	36	2.85%	12	0.95%	1,264
Kingsbury	2,037	40.13%	2,813	55.42%	226	4.45%	-776	-15.29%	5,076
Lake	2,520	41.94%	3,182	52.95%	307	5.11%	-662	-11.02%	6,009
Lawrence	3,809	43.03%	4,974	56.19%	69	0.78%	-1,165	-13.16%	8,852
Lincoln	2,541	42.17%	2,918	48.42%	567	9.41%	-377	-6.26%	6,026
Lyman	1,321	54.14%	1,090	44.67%	29	1.19%	231	9.47%	2,440
Marshall	2,220	65.54%	1,105	32.62%	62	1.83%	1,115	32.92%	3,387
McCook	2,536	52.28%	2,117	43.64%	198	4.08%	419	8.64%	4,851
McPherson	1,556	44.39%	1,921	54.81%	28	0.80%	-365	-10.41%	3,505
Meade	2,304	49.91%	2,064	44.71%	248	5.37%	240	5.20%	4,616
Mellette	808	52.91%	711	46.56%	8	0.52%	97	6.35%	1,527
Miner	2,051	57.74%	1,377	38.77%	124	3.49%	674	18.98%	3,552
Minnehaha	13,174	49.70%	12,418	46.85%	916	3.46%	756	2.85%	26,508
Moody	2,366	51.89%	1,992	43.68%	202	4.43%	374	8.20%	4,560
Pennington	5,557	53.29%	4,442	42.60%	429	4.11%	1,115	10.69%	10,428
Perkins	1,940	56.64%	1,408	41.11%	77	2.25%	532	15.53%	3,425
Potter	1,338	58.02%	914	39.64%	54	2.34%	424	18.39%	2,306
Roberts	3,820	64.19%	1,934	32.50%	197	3.31%	1,886	31.69%	5,951
Sanborn	1,919	59.89%	1,174	36.64%	111	3.46%	745	23.25%	3,204
Shannon	634	47.46%	667	49.93%	35	2.62%	-33	-2.47%	1,336
Spink	3,569	60.79%	2,078	35.39%	224	3.82%	1,491	25.40%	5,871
Stanley	629	53.49%	495	42.09%	52	4.42%	134	11.39%	1,176
Sully	437	38.40%	667	58.61%	34	2.99%	-230	-20.21%	1,138
Todd	1,318	67.04%	624	31.74%	24	1.22%	694	35.30%	1,966
Tripp	2,708	60.38%	1,693	37.75%	84	1.87%	1,015	22.63%	4,485
Turner	2,923	44.79%	3,214	49.25%	389	5.96%	-291	-4.46%	6,526
Union	3,520	60.85%	1,845	31.89%	420	7.26%	1,675	28.95%	5,785
Walworth	2,212	60.34%	1,420	38.73%	34	0.93%	792	21.60%	3,666
Washabaugh	313	55.79%	238	42.42%	10	1.78%	75	13.37%	561
Washington	234	59.69%	158	40.31%	0	0.00%	76	19.39%	392
Yankton	4,349	58.47%	2,702	36.33%	387	5.20%	1,647	22.14%	7,438
Ziebach	737	55.46%	561	42.21%	31	2.33%	176	13.24%	1,329
Armstrong (Note: No returns were canvassed for Armstrong County and voters from this county were listed in neighbouring counties.)	0	N/A	0	N/A	0	N/A	N/A	N/A	0
Totals	160,137	54.02%	125,977	42.49%	10,348	3.49%	34,160	11.52%	296,462

==== Counties that flipped from Democratic to Republican ====
- Brookings
- Butte
- Campbell
- Deuel
- Hamlin
- Hutchinson
- Hyde
- Kingsbury
- Lake
- Lincoln
- McPherson
- Shannon
- Sully
- Turner

== See also ==
- United States presidential elections in South Dakota
