= 1960 United States presidential election in South Dakota =

- November 8, 1960

Nominee	Richard Nixon	John F. Kennedy
Party	Republican	Democratic
Home state	California	Massachusetts
Running mate	Henry Cabot Lodge Jr.	Lyndon B. Johnson
Electoral vote	4	0
Popular vote	178,417	128,070
Percentage	58.21%	41.79%
County results
Nixon
50–60%
60–70%
70–80%
Kennedy
50–60%
60–70%
President before election
Dwight D. Eisenhower
Republican
Elected President
John F. Kennedy
Democratic

The 1960 United States presidential election in South Dakota took place on November 8, 1960, as part of the 1960 United States presidential election. Voters chose four representatives, or electors, to the Electoral College, who voted for president and vice president.

South Dakota was won by incumbent Vice President Richard Nixon (R–California), running with United States Ambassador to the United Nations Henry Cabot Lodge Jr. of Massachusetts, with 58.21% of the popular vote, against Massachusetts Senator John F. Kennedy (D), running with Texas Senator Lyndon B. Johnson, with 41.79% of the popular vote.

As of the 2024 presidential election, this is the last election in which majority Native American Todd County voted for a Republican presidential candidate. With 58.21% of the popular vote, South Dakota would prove to be Nixon's fifth strongest state in the 1960 election after Nebraska, Kansas, Oklahoma and Vermont.

== Primaries ==
Both the Republican and Democratic parties held primaries on June 7.

=== Democratic primary ===
Hubert Humphrey was unopposed on the Democratic primary ballot. Kennedy had decided against competing in the state because he recognized that Humphrey, who had grown up in the state, had a distinct advantage there.

1960 South Dakota Democratic Presidential Primary Results
Party	Candidate	Votes	Percentage
Democratic	Hubert Humphrey	24,773	100.00%
Totals		24,773	100%

=== Republican primary ===
No candidates ran in the Republican primary.

1960 South Dakota Republican Presidential Primary Results
Party	Candidate	Votes	Percentage
Republican	Unpledged delegates	48,461	100%
Totals		48,461	100%

== Results ==
1960 United States presidential election in South Dakota
Party	Candidate	Votes	%
Republican	Richard Nixon	178,417	58.21%
Democratic	John F. Kennedy	128,070	41.79%
Total votes		306,487	100%

=== Results by county ===
County	Richard Nixon Republican		John F. Kennedy Democratic		Margin		Total votes cast
County	#	%	#	%	#	%	Total votes cast
Aurora	1,267	49.94%	1,270	50.06%	-3	-0.12%	2,537
Beadle	5,911	59.17%	4,079	40.83%	1,832	18.34%	9,990
Bennett	779	56.20%	607	43.80%	172	12.40%	1,386
Bon Homme	2,730	57.09%	2,052	42.91%	678	14.18%	4,782
Brookings	5,710	65.75%	2,974	34.25%	2,736	31.50%	8,684
Brown	8,037	50.45%	7,893	49.55%	144	0.90%	15,930
Brule	1,403	46.72%	1,600	53.28%	-197	-6.56%	3,003
Buffalo	294	46.82%	334	53.18%	-40	-6.36%	628
Butte	2,496	65.44%	1,318	34.56%	1,178	30.88%	3,814
Campbell	1,330	78.61%	362	21.39%	968	57.22%	1,692
Charles Mix	2,446	47.04%	2,754	52.96%	-308	-5.92%	5,200
Clark	2,204	61.05%	1,406	38.95%	798	22.10%	3,610
Clay	2,772	59.61%	1,878	40.39%	894	19.22%	4,650
Codington	5,309	55.23%	4,304	44.77%	1,005	10.46%	9,613
Corson	1,290	54.13%	1,093	45.87%	197	8.26%	2,383
Custer	1,533	63.58%	878	36.42%	655	27.16%	2,411
Davison	4,105	49.98%	4,108	50.02%	-3	-0.04%	8,213
Day	2,626	48.09%	2,835	51.91%	-209	-3.82%	5,461
Deuel	1,907	61.92%	1,173	38.08%	734	23.84%	3,080
Dewey	1,168	52.80%	1,044	47.20%	124	5.60%	2,212
Douglas	2,002	78.73%	541	21.27%	1,461	57.46%	2,543
Edmunds	1,728	51.78%	1,609	48.22%	119	3.56%	3,337
Fall River	2,492	63.60%	1,426	36.40%	1,066	27.20%	3,918
Faulk	1,240	54.31%	1,043	45.69%	197	8.62%	2,283
Grant	2,611	55.26%	2,114	44.74%	497	10.52%	4,725
Gregory	2,063	53.71%	1,778	46.29%	285	7.42%	3,841
Haakon	980	62.22%	595	37.78%	385	24.44%	1,575
Hamlin	2,139	63.49%	1,230	36.51%	909	26.98%	3,369
Hand	1,872	57.27%	1,397	42.73%	475	14.54%	3,269
Hanson	1,087	48.53%	1,153	51.47%	-66	-2.94%	2,240
Harding	676	63.89%	382	36.11%	294	27.78%	1,058
Hughes	3,320	61.99%	2,036	38.01%	1,284	23.98%	5,356
Hutchinson	3,948	71.72%	1,557	28.28%	2,391	43.44%	5,505
Hyde	773	53.94%	660	46.06%	113	7.88%	1,433
Jackson	581	61.35%	366	38.65%	215	22.70%	947
Jerauld	1,165	57.45%	863	42.55%	302	14.90%	2,028
Jones	644	60.36%	423	39.64%	221	20.72%	1,067
Kingsbury	2,887	63.26%	1,677	36.74%	1,210	26.52%	4,564
Lake	3,520	61.28%	2,224	38.72%	1,296	22.56%	5,744
Lawrence	5,083	66.06%	2,612	33.94%	2,471	32.12%	7,695
Lincoln	3,553	64.16%	1,985	35.84%	1,568	28.32%	5,538
Lyman	1,166	57.78%	852	42.22%	314	15.56%	2,018
Marshall	1,704	50.44%	1,674	49.56%	30	0.88%	3,378
McCook	2,375	56.93%	1,797	43.07%	578	13.86%	4,172
McPherson	2,354	79.26%	616	20.74%	1,738	58.52%	2,970
Meade	2,644	57.89%	1,923	42.11%	721	15.78%	4,567
Mellette	774	60.28%	510	39.72%	264	20.56%	1,284
Miner	1,377	51.13%	1,316	48.87%	61	2.26%	2,693
Minnehaha	23,238	60.53%	15,152	39.47%	8,086	21.06%	38,390
Moody	2,119	52.49%	1,918	47.51%	201	4.98%	4,037
Pennington	11,364	60.31%	7,478	39.69%	3,886	20.62%	18,842
Perkins	1,767	60.29%	1,164	39.71%	603	20.58%	2,931
Potter	1,326	56.91%	1,004	43.09%	322	13.82%	2,330
Roberts	2,857	48.05%	3,089	51.95%	-232	-3.90%	5,946
Sanborn	1,254	50.10%	1,249	49.90%	5	0.20%	2,503
Shannon	655	36.59%	1,135	63.41%	-480	-26.82%	1,790
Spink	2,738	51.65%	2,563	48.35%	175	3.30%	5,301
Stanley	678	48.15%	730	51.85%	-52	-3.70%	1,408
Sully	864	64.14%	483	35.86%	381	28.28%	1,347
Todd	909	50.14%	904	49.86%	5	0.28%	1,813
Tripp	2,466	58.52%	1,748	41.48%	718	17.04%	4,214
Turner	4,120	72.70%	1,547	27.30%	2,573	45.40%	5,667
Union	2,688	53.56%	2,331	46.44%	357	7.12%	5,019
Walworth	2,406	62.11%	1,468	37.89%	938	24.22%	3,874
Washabaugh	260	54.97%	213	45.03%	47	9.94%	473
Yankton	4,065	57.04%	3,061	42.96%	1,004	14.08%	7,126
Ziebach	568	52.59%	512	47.41%	56	5.18%	1,080
Totals	178,417	58.21%	128,070	41.79%	50,347	16.42%	306,487

==== Counties that flipped from Republican to Democratic ====
- Davison
- Stanley

==== Counties that flipped from Democratic to Republican ====
- Miner
- Spink
- Todd

== See also ==
- United States presidential elections in South Dakota
