= 1956 United States presidential election in South Dakota =

- November 6, 1956

All 4 South Dakota votes to the Electoral College

Nominee	Dwight D. Eisenhower	Adlai Stevenson
Party	Republican	Democratic
Home state	Pennsylvania (Note: Although he was born in Texas and grew up in Kansas before his military career, at the time of the 1952 election Eisenhower was president of Columbia University and was, officially, a resident of New York. During his first term as president, he moved his private residence to Gettysburg, Pennsylvania, and officially changed his residency to Pennsylvania.)	Illinois
Running mate	Richard Nixon	Estes Kefauver
Electoral vote	4	0
Popular vote	171,569	122,288
Percentage	58.39%	41.61%
County results
Eisenhower
50–60%
60–70%
70–80%
80–90%
Stevenson
50–60%
President before election
Dwight D. Eisenhower
Republican
Elected President
Dwight D. Eisenhower
Republican

The 1956 United States presidential election in South Dakota took place on November 6, 1956, as part of the 1956 United States presidential election. Voters chose four representatives, or electors, to the Electoral College, who voted for president and vice president.

South Dakota was won by incumbent President Dwight D. Eisenhower (R–Pennsylvania), running with Vice President Richard Nixon, with 58.39 percent of the popular vote, against Adlai Stevenson (D–Illinois), running with Tennessee Senator Estes Kefauver, with 41.61% of the popular vote. Although President Eisenhower easily won the state, it was by a significantly smaller margin than he did four years prior.

== Results ==
1956 United States presidential election in South Dakota
Party	Candidate	Votes	%
Republican	Dwight D. Eisenhower (inc.)	171,569	58.39%
Democratic	Adlai Stevenson	122,288	41.61%
Total votes		293,857	100%

=== Results by county ===
County	Dwight D. Eisenhower Republican		Adlai Stevenson Democratic		Margin		Total votes cast
County	#	%	#	%	#	%	Total votes cast
Aurora	1,055	43.43%	1,374	56.57%	-319	-13.14%	2,429
Beadle	5,216	53.06%	4,614	46.94%	602	6.12%	9,830
Bennett	746	52.13%	685	47.87%	61	4.26%	1,431
Bon Homme	2,696	55.70%	2,144	44.30%	552	11.40%	4,840
Brookings	5,293	66.89%	2,620	33.11%	2,673	33.78%	7,913
Brown	8,193	53.28%	7,184	46.72%	1,009	6.56%	15,377
Brule	1,317	41.02%	1,894	58.98%	-577	-17.96%	3,211
Buffalo	314	49.68%	318	50.32%	-4	-0.64%	632
Butte	2,231	68.46%	1,028	31.54%	1,203	36.92%	3,259
Campbell	1,268	81.44%	289	18.56%	979	62.88%	1,557
Charles Mix	2,202	41.40%	3,117	58.60%	-915	-17.20%	5,319
Clark	2,173	58.83%	1,521	41.17%	652	17.66%	3,694
Clay	2,632	57.72%	1,928	42.28%	704	15.44%	4,560
Codington	5,150	57.72%	3,772	42.28%	1,378	15.44%	8,922
Corson	1,394	55.63%	1,112	44.37%	282	11.26%	2,506
Custer	1,514	63.96%	853	36.04%	661	27.92%	2,367
Davison	4,056	51.57%	3,809	48.43%	247	3.14%	7,865
Day	2,652	47.16%	2,971	52.84%	-319	-5.68%	5,623
Deuel	1,698	55.47%	1,363	44.53%	335	10.94%	3,061
Dewey	1,197	56.76%	912	43.24%	285	13.52%	2,109
Douglas	1,713	67.81%	813	32.19%	900	35.62%	2,526
Edmunds	1,685	51.61%	1,580	48.39%	105	3.22%	3,265
Fall River	2,377	67.39%	1,150	32.61%	1,227	34.78%	3,527
Faulk	1,260	52.17%	1,155	47.83%	105	4.34%	2,415
Grant	2,621	55.87%	2,070	44.13%	551	11.74%	4,691
Gregory	1,945	52.01%	1,795	47.99%	150	4.02%	3,740
Haakon	936	61.18%	594	38.82%	342	22.36%	1,530
Hamlin	2,083	61.68%	1,294	38.32%	789	23.36%	3,377
Hand	1,804	55.39%	1,453	44.61%	351	10.78%	3,257
Hanson	1,050	46.94%	1,187	53.06%	-137	-6.12%	2,237
Harding	650	63.35%	376	36.65%	274	26.70%	1,026
Hughes	2,923	63.41%	1,687	36.59%	1,236	26.82%	4,610
Hutchinson	3,870	73.16%	1,420	26.84%	2,450	46.32%	5,290
Hyde	755	55.84%	597	44.16%	158	11.68%	1,352
Jackson	490	54.57%	408	45.43%	82	9.14%	898
Jerauld	1,175	53.90%	1,005	46.10%	170	7.80%	2,180
Jones	601	56.06%	471	43.94%	130	12.12%	1,072
Kingsbury	2,933	64.92%	1,585	35.08%	1,348	29.84%	4,518
Lake	3,404	62.32%	2,058	37.68%	1,346	24.64%	5,462
Lawrence	4,654	71.33%	1,871	28.67%	2,783	42.66%	6,525
Lincoln	3,529	62.24%	2,141	37.76%	1,388	24.48%	5,670
Lyman	1,151	56.87%	873	43.13%	278	13.74%	2,024
Marshall	1,639	50.06%	1,635	49.94%	4	0.12%	3,274
McCook	2,382	57.54%	1,758	42.46%	624	15.08%	4,140
McPherson	2,225	77.85%	633	22.15%	1,592	55.70%	2,858
Meade	2,467	59.81%	1,658	40.19%	809	19.62%	4,125
Mellette	643	55.29%	520	44.71%	123	10.58%	1,163
Miner	1,456	48.97%	1,517	51.03%	-61	-2.06%	2,973
Minnehaha	22,285	62.99%	13,093	37.01%	9,192	25.98%	35,378
Moody	2,133	53.69%	1,840	46.31%	293	7.38%	3,973
Pennington	10,955	67.26%	5,332	32.74%	5,623	34.52%	16,287
Perkins	1,743	59.41%	1,191	40.59%	552	18.82%	2,934
Potter	1,445	63.16%	843	36.84%	602	26.32%	2,288
Roberts	2,854	46.79%	3,246	53.21%	-392	-6.42%	6,100
Sanborn	1,327	50.48%	1,302	49.52%	25	0.96%	2,629
Shannon	782	45.18%	949	54.82%	-167	-9.64%	1,731
Spink	2,683	48.29%	2,873	51.71%	-190	-3.42%	5,556
Stanley	587	50.87%	567	49.13%	20	1.74%	1,154
Sully	726	59.51%	494	40.49%	232	19.02%	1,220
Todd	748	47.31%	833	52.69%	-85	-5.38%	1,581
Tripp	2,064	52.94%	1,835	47.06%	229	5.88%	3,899
Turner	4,096	70.89%	1,682	29.11%	2,414	41.78%	5,778
Union	2,636	52.94%	2,343	47.06%	293	5.88%	4,979
Walworth	2,132	60.21%	1,409	39.79%	723	20.42%	3,541
Washabaugh	265	58.89%	185	41.11%	80	17.78%	450
Yankton	4,063	57.63%	2,987	42.37%	1,076	15.26%	7,050
Ziebach	627	57.05%	472	42.95%	155	14.10%	1,099
Totals	171,569	58.39%	122,288	41.61%	49,281	16.78%	293,857

==== Counties that flipped from Republican to Democratic ====
- Aurora
- Brule
- Buffalo
- Charles Mix
- Day
- Hanson
- Miner
- Roberts
- Shannon
- Spink
- Todd

== See also ==
- United States presidential elections in South Dakota
