= Bad Nation Township, Mellette County, South Dakota =

Township in Mellette County, South Dakota

Coordinates: 43.6003°N 100.3430°W

Bad Nation Township is a township in Mellette County, in the U.S. state of South Dakota.

== History ==
The township has the name of Bad Nation, a Native American chieftain.
