= 1968 United States presidential election in South Dakota =

- November 5, 1968

Nominee	Richard Nixon	Hubert Humphrey
Party	Republican	Democratic
Home state	New York (Note: Although he was born in California and he served as a U.S. senator from California, in 1968 Richard Nixon's official state of residence was New York, because he moved there to practice law after his defeat in the 1962 California gubernatorial election. During his first term as president, Nixon re-established his residency in California. Consequently, most reliable reference books list Nixon's home state as New York in the 1968 election and his home state as California in the 1972 (and 1960) election.)	Minnesota
Running mate	Spiro Agnew	Edmund Muskie
Electoral vote	4	0
Popular vote	149,841	118,023
Percentage	53.27%	41.96%

Nixon
40–50%
50–60%
60–70%
70–80%
80–90%
90–100%
Humphrey
30–40%
40–50%
50–60%
60–70%
70–80%
80–90%
90–100%
Wallace
30–40%
President before election
Lyndon B. Johnson
Democratic
Elected President
Richard Nixon
Republican

The 1968 United States presidential election in South Dakota took place on November 5, 1968, as part of the 1968 United States presidential election. Voters chose four representatives, or electors, to the Electoral College, who voted for president and vice president.

South Dakota was won by former Vice President Richard Nixon (R–New York), with 53.27 percent of the popular vote, against Vice President Hubert Humphrey (D–Minnesota), with 41.96 percent of the popular vote. Independent candidate George Wallace would carry five Southern states, but finished with a mere 4.76 percent of South Dakota's popular vote. Although the West River region of South Dakota possessed racial conflicts between Whites and Native Americans (similar to White-Black racial conflict in Northern cities like Chicago), significant anti-Southern feeling amongst its Yankee descendants limited Wallace's appeal even there, and in the East River with fewer Native Americans and a strong Scandinavian-American influence, Wallace possessed generally insignificant appeal. Although he performed reasonably in some West River counties (which had South Dakota’s highest concentration of settlers from Southern/border states), within the more populous East River Wallace cracked half his national percentage (6.75%) only in ranching and wheat-dependent Hyde, Faulk, Hand, and Sully Counties. Consequently, South Dakota proved Wallace's eighth-weakest state nationally, and second-weakest in the Midwest (after neighbor Minnesota). Davison and Hanson counties were the only ones to vote for Nixon in 1968 but in neither 1960 nor 1972, along with Rusk County in Wisconsin.

== Results ==
1968 United States presidential election in South Dakota
Party	Candidate	Votes	%
Republican	Richard Nixon	149,841	53.27%
Democratic	Hubert Humphrey	118,023	41.96%
Independent	George Wallace	13,400	4.76%
Total votes		281,264	100%

=== Results by county ===
County	Richard Nixon Republican		Hubert Humphrey Democratic		George Wallace Independent		Margin		Total votes cast
County	#	%	#	%	#	%	#	%	Total votes cast
Aurora	1,043	46.71%	1,060	47.47%	130	5.82%	-17	-0.76%	2,233
Beadle	4,214	42.66%	5,357	54.23%	307	3.11%	-1,143	-11.57%	9,878
Bennett	665	53.93%	457	37.06%	111	9.00%	208	16.87%	1,233
Bon Homme	2,411	55.01%	1,773	40.45%	199	4.54%	638	14.56%	4,383
Brookings	4,674	57.84%	3,202	39.62%	205	2.54%	1,472	18.22%	8,081
Brown	6,685	45.95%	7,302	50.20%	560	3.85%	-617	-4.25%	14,547
Brule	1,237	43.94%	1,425	50.62%	153	5.44%	-188	-6.68%	2,815
Buffalo	261	47.11%	265	47.83%	28	5.05%	-4	-0.72%	554
Butte	2,090	63.28%	1,017	30.79%	196	5.93%	1,073	32.49%	3,303
Campbell	1,216	79.27%	245	15.97%	73	4.76%	971	63.30%	1,534
Charles Mix	2,093	44.77%	2,369	50.67%	213	4.56%	-276	-5.90%	4,675
Clark	1,596	52.50%	1,325	43.59%	119	3.91%	271	8.91%	3,040
Clay	2,249	51.28%	2,006	45.74%	131	2.99%	243	5.54%	4,386
Codington	3,929	46.49%	4,235	50.11%	288	3.41%	-306	-3.62%	8,452
Corson	1,108	55.15%	821	40.87%	80	3.98%	287	14.28%	2,009
Custer	1,143	55.38%	727	35.22%	194	9.40%	416	20.16%	2,064
Davison	3,869	50.12%	3,585	46.44%	265	3.43%	284	3.68%	7,719
Day	2,062	43.81%	2,463	52.33%	182	3.87%	-401	-8.52%	4,707
Deuel	1,398	53.26%	1,076	40.99%	151	5.75%	322	12.27%	2,625
Dewey	941	52.72%	721	40.39%	123	6.89%	220	12.33%	1,785
Douglas	1,613	70.68%	592	25.94%	77	3.37%	1,021	44.74%	2,282
Edmunds	1,534	52.18%	1,225	41.67%	181	6.16%	309	10.51%	2,940
Fall River	1,843	59.57%	965	31.19%	286	9.24%	878	28.38%	3,094
Faulk	997	49.48%	819	40.65%	199	9.88%	178	8.83%	2,015
Grant	2,259	51.81%	1,890	43.35%	211	4.84%	369	8.46%	4,360
Gregory	1,810	54.40%	1,266	38.05%	251	7.54%	544	16.35%	3,327
Haakon	759	60.96%	377	30.28%	109	8.76%	382	30.68%	1,245
Hamlin	1,649	56.36%	1,149	39.27%	128	4.37%	500	17.09%	2,926
Hand	1,650	54.78%	1,136	37.72%	226	7.50%	514	17.06%	3,012
Hanson	901	50.08%	826	45.91%	72	4.00%	75	4.17%	1,799
Harding	564	63.02%	266	29.72%	65	7.26%	298	33.30%	895
Hughes	3,204	61.46%	1,666	31.96%	343	6.58%	1,538	29.50%	5,213
Hutchinson	3,544	69.07%	1,412	27.52%	175	3.41%	2,132	41.55%	5,131
Hyde	713	53.81%	499	37.66%	113	8.53%	214	16.15%	1,325
Jackson	480	56.80%	267	31.60%	98	11.60%	213	25.20%	845
Jerauld	1,002	55.57%	745	41.32%	56	3.11%	257	14.25%	1,803
Jones	562	55.75%	358	35.52%	88	8.73%	204	20.23%	1,008
Kingsbury	2,300	58.42%	1,491	37.87%	146	3.71%	809	20.55%	3,937
Lake	2,876	53.68%	2,294	42.81%	188	3.51%	582	10.87%	5,358
Lawrence	4,185	60.23%	2,425	34.90%	338	4.86%	1,760	25.33%	6,948
Lincoln	3,259	59.89%	1,961	36.03%	222	4.08%	1,298	23.86%	5,442
Lyman	1,063	57.87%	643	35.00%	131	7.13%	420	22.87%	1,837
Marshall	1,471	47.01%	1,518	48.51%	140	4.47%	-47	-1.50%	3,129
McCook	1,959	51.55%	1,653	43.50%	188	4.95%	306	8.05%	3,800
McPherson	2,105	80.34%	389	14.85%	126	4.81%	1,716	65.49%	2,620
Meade	2,392	56.19%	1,522	35.75%	343	8.06%	870	20.44%	4,257
Mellette	611	55.70%	407	37.10%	79	7.20%	204	18.60%	1,097
Miner	1,045	43.69%	1,255	52.47%	92	3.85%	-210	-8.78%	2,392
Minnehaha	20,141	53.31%	16,462	43.57%	1,177	3.12%	3,679	9.74%	37,780
Moody	1,689	48.87%	1,614	46.70%	153	4.43%	75	2.17%	3,456
Pennington	9,671	53.29%	7,303	40.24%	1,174	6.47%	2,368	13.05%	18,148
Perkins	1,498	60.38%	869	35.03%	114	4.59%	629	25.35%	2,481
Potter	1,273	57.81%	780	35.42%	149	6.77%	493	22.39%	2,202
Roberts	2,225	42.68%	2,651	50.85%	337	6.46%	-426	-8.17%	5,213
Sanborn	1,024	49.71%	956	46.41%	80	3.88%	68	3.30%	2,060
Shannon	533	29.68%	1,202	66.93%	61	3.40%	-669	-37.25%	1,796
Spink	2,068	42.08%	2,669	54.30%	178	3.62%	-601	-12.22%	4,915
Stanley	572	51.58%	439	39.59%	98	8.84%	133	11.99%	1,109
Sully	676	60.09%	356	31.64%	93	8.27%	320	28.45%	1,125
Todd	683	38.78%	987	56.05%	91	5.17%	-304	-17.27%	1,761
Tripp	2,242	58.25%	1,362	35.39%	245	6.37%	880	22.86%	3,849
Turner	3,246	67.61%	1,350	28.12%	205	4.27%	1,896	39.49%	4,801
Union	2,212	49.70%	2,014	45.25%	225	5.06%	198	4.45%	4,451
Walworth	2,204	60.19%	1,276	34.84%	182	4.97%	928	25.35%	3,662
Washabaugh	224	49.89%	203	45.21%	22	4.90%	21	4.68%	449
Yankton	3,977	56.08%	2,733	38.54%	382	5.39%	1,244	17.54%	7,092
Ziebach	449	52.58%	350	40.98%	55	6.44%	99	11.60%	854
Totals	149,841	53.27%	118,023	41.96%	13,400	4.76%	31,818	11.31%	281,264

==== Counties that flipped from Democratic to Republican ====
- Bennett
- Bon Homme
- Brookings
- Buffalo
- Clark
- Clay
- Corson
- Custer
- Davison
- Deuel
- Dewey
- Douglas
- Edmunds
- Faulk
- Grant
- Gregory
- Hamlin
- Hand
- Hanson
- Hyde
- Jackson
- Jerauld
- Jones
- Lake
- Lincoln
- Lyman
- McCook
- Meade
- Mellette
- Minnehaha
- Moody
- Pennington
- Potter
- Sanborn
- Stanley
- Tripp
- Union
- Walworth
- Yankton
- Ziebach

== See also ==
- United States presidential elections in South Dakota
