= 1976 United States presidential election in South Dakota =

- November 2, 1976

Nominee	Gerald Ford	Jimmy Carter
Party	Republican	Democratic
Home state	Michigan	Georgia
Running mate	Bob Dole	Walter Mondale
Electoral vote	4	0
Popular vote	151,505	147,068
Percentage	50.39%	48.91%
County results
Ford
40–50%
50–60%
60–70%
70–80%
Carter
40–50%
50–60%
60–70%
President before election
Gerald Ford
Republican
Elected President
Jimmy Carter
Democratic

The 1976 United States presidential election in South Dakota was held on November 2, 1976 as part of the 1976 United States presidential election. Incumbent President Gerald Ford won the state of South Dakota, defeating Democratic candidate Jimmy Carter by a slim margin of 1.48%. Ford won all four of the state's electoral votes, but lost the national election to Carter. This is the closest that a Democrat presidential nominee has come to carrying South Dakota since 1964.

South Dakota weighed in as 4 points more Republican than the national average. As of the 2024 presidential election, this is the last election in which Codington County, Edmunds County, Faulk County, Gregory County, and McCook County voted for a Democratic presidential candidate. This is also the last time a Democrat won any of South Dakota's congressional districts, namely the 1st, as both it and the 2nd would be eliminated after the 1980 census.

== Results ==
Presidential Candidate	Running Mate	Party	Electoral Vote (EV)	Popular Vote (PV)	
Gerald Ford of Michigan (incumbent)	Bob Dole	Republican	4	151,505	50.39%
Jimmy Carter	Walter Mondale	Democratic	0	147,068	48.91%
Roger MacBride	David Bergland	Independent	0	1,619	0.54%
Gus Hall	Jarvis Tyner	Independent	0	318	0.11%
Peter Camejo	Willie Mae Reid	Independent	0	168	0.06%

=== Results by county ===
County	Gerald Ford Republican		Jimmy Carter Democratic		Roger MacBride Independent		Gus Hall Independent		Peter Camejo Independent		Margin		Total votes cast
County	#	%	#	%	#	%	#	%	#	%	#	%	Total votes cast
Aurora	831	39.40%	1,269	60.17%	4	0.19%	5	0.24%	0	0.00%	-438	-20.77%	2,109
Beadle	4,758	49.22%	4,846	50.13%	38	0.39%	18	0.19%	6	0.06%	-88	-0.91%	9,666
Bennett	610	54.91%	481	43.29%	15	1.35%	1	0.09%	4	0.36%	129	11.62%	1,111
Bon Homme	1,897	46.58%	2,154	52.88%	12	0.29%	10	0.25%	0	0.00%	-257	-6.30%	4,073
Brookings	5,278	52.64%	4,685	46.73%	40	0.40%	14	0.14%	9	0.09%	593	5.91%	10,026
Brown	7,609	45.75%	8,888	53.44%	91	0.55%	29	0.17%	16	0.10%	-1,279	-7.69%	16,633
Brule	1,175	43.15%	1,534	56.33%	6	0.22%	5	0.18%	3	0.11%	-359	-13.18%	2,723
Buffalo	194	44.70%	240	55.30%	0	0.00%	0	0.00%	0	0.00%	-46	-10.60%	434
Butte	2,055	59.19%	1,366	39.34%	43	1.24%	6	0.17%	2	0.06%	689	19.85%	3,472
Campbell	897	64.49%	489	35.15%	3	0.22%	2	0.14%	0	0.00%	408	29.34%	1,391
Charles Mix	1,779	40.49%	2,593	59.01%	12	0.27%	9	0.20%	1	0.02%	-814	-18.52%	4,394
Clark	1,449	51.06%	1,376	48.48%	7	0.25%	4	0.14%	2	0.07%	73	2.58%	2,838
Clay	2,647	49.93%	2,593	48.92%	41	0.77%	11	0.21%	9	0.17%	54	1.01%	5,301
Codington	4,504	48.89%	4,680	50.80%	19	0.21%	7	0.08%	3	0.03%	-176	-1.91%	9,213
Corson	846	46.41%	967	53.04%	9	0.49%	1	0.05%	0	0.00%	-121	-6.63%	1,823
Custer	1,373	57.09%	995	41.37%	34	1.41%	2	0.08%	1	0.04%	378	15.72%	2,405
Davison	3,688	44.71%	4,510	54.68%	35	0.42%	13	0.16%	2	0.02%	-822	-9.97%	8,248
Day	1,617	37.98%	2,610	61.31%	16	0.38%	10	0.23%	4	0.09%	-993	-23.33%	4,257
Deuel	1,177	44.38%	1,465	55.24%	6	0.23%	2	0.08%	2	0.08%	-288	-10.86%	2,652
Dewey	820	53.46%	706	46.02%	7	0.46%	1	0.07%	0	0.00%	114	7.44%	1,534
Douglas	1,315	57.30%	975	42.48%	4	0.17%	1	0.04%	0	0.00%	340	14.82%	2,295
Edmunds	1,294	44.13%	1,629	55.56%	3	0.10%	6	0.20%	0	0.00%	-335	-11.43%	2,932
Fall River	2,046	56.60%	1,537	42.52%	28	0.77%	3	0.08%	1	0.03%	509	14.08%	3,615
Faulk	868	44.81%	1,063	54.88%	4	0.21%	2	0.10%	0	0.00%	-195	-10.07%	1,937
Grant	2,051	45.95%	2,398	53.72%	11	0.25%	3	0.07%	1	0.02%	-347	-7.77%	4,464
Gregory	1,475	46.90%	1,658	52.72%	12	0.38%	0	0.00%	0	0.00%	-183	-5.82%	3,145
Haakon	812	61.89%	477	36.36%	20	1.52%	2	0.15%	1	0.08%	335	25.53%	1,312
Hamlin	1,452	50.66%	1,402	48.92%	8	0.28%	3	0.10%	1	0.03%	50	1.74%	2,866
Hand	1,510	50.43%	1,477	49.33%	3	0.10%	3	0.10%	1	0.03%	33	1.10%	2,994
Hanson	693	40.60%	1,005	58.88%	5	0.29%	4	0.23%	0	0.00%	-312	-18.28%	1,707
Harding	470	49.74%	459	48.57%	16	1.69%	0	0.00%	0	0.00%	11	1.17%	945
Hughes	3,997	61.15%	2,506	38.34%	17	0.26%	7	0.11%	9	0.14%	1,491	22.81%	6,536
Hutchinson	2,822	57.52%	2,062	42.03%	14	0.29%	7	0.14%	1	0.02%	760	15.49%	4,906
Hyde	687	54.39%	572	45.29%	2	0.16%	1	0.08%	1	0.08%	115	9.10%	1,263
Jackson	532	61.50%	313	36.18%	16	1.85%	2	0.23%	2	0.23%	219	25.32%	865
Jerauld	821	49.19%	845	50.63%	2	0.12%	1	0.06%	0	0.00%	-24	-1.44%	1,669
Jones	515	57.87%	374	42.02%	1	0.11%	0	0.00%	0	0.00%	141	15.85%	890
Kingsbury	1,844	50.98%	1,762	48.71%	11	0.30%	0	0.00%	0	0.00%	82	2.27%	3,617
Lake	2,530	46.20%	2,930	53.51%	10	0.18%	5	0.09%	1	0.02%	-400	-7.31%	5,476
Lawrence	4,206	56.46%	3,102	41.64%	129	1.73%	9	0.12%	3	0.04%	1,104	14.82%	7,449
Lincoln	3,105	51.04%	2,957	48.60%	19	0.31%	1	0.02%	2	0.03%	148	2.44%	6,084
Lyman	892	51.29%	831	47.79%	13	0.75%	1	0.06%	2	0.12%	61	3.50%	1,739
Marshall	1,233	41.56%	1,721	58.00%	11	0.37%	2	0.07%	0	0.00%	-488	-16.44%	2,967
McCook	1,744	48.74%	1,822	50.92%	11	0.31%	1	0.03%	0	0.00%	-78	-2.18%	3,578
McPherson	1,662	70.22%	693	29.28%	6	0.25%	6	0.25%	0	0.00%	969	40.94%	2,367
Meade	3,096	54.41%	2,478	43.55%	106	1.86%	2	0.04%	8	0.14%	618	10.86%	5,690
Mellette	508	53.53%	429	45.21%	10	1.05%	2	0.21%	0	0.00%	79	8.32%	949
Miner	839	39.21%	1,289	60.23%	9	0.42%	1	0.05%	2	0.09%	-450	-21.02%	2,140
Minnehaha	23,286	51.12%	22,068	48.44%	151	0.33%	26	0.06%	25	0.05%	1,218	2.68%	45,556
Moody	1,475	43.03%	1,942	56.65%	8	0.23%	2	0.06%	1	0.03%	-467	-13.62%	3,428
Pennington	13,352	56.34%	10,058	42.44%	273	1.15%	5	0.02%	11	0.05%	3,294	13.90%	23,699
Perkins	1,298	50.08%	1,262	48.69%	29	1.12%	1	0.04%	2	0.08%	36	1.39%	2,592
Potter	1,136	55.36%	908	44.25%	6	0.29%	1	0.05%	1	0.05%	228	11.11%	2,052
Roberts	1,915	39.73%	2,890	59.96%	9	0.19%	4	0.08%	2	0.04%	-975	-20.23%	4,820
Sanborn	881	46.08%	1,025	53.61%	5	0.26%	1	0.05%	0	0.00%	-144	-7.53%	1,912
Shannon	301	27.84%	756	69.94%	17	1.57%	5	0.46%	2	0.19%	-455	-42.10%	1,081
Spink	2,003	42.81%	2,650	56.64%	17	0.36%	6	0.13%	3	0.06%	-647	-13.83%	4,679
Stanley	637	53.57%	548	46.09%	3	0.25%	1	0.08%	0	0.00%	89	7.48%	1,189
Sully	630	55.31%	505	44.34%	4	0.35%	0	0.00%	0	0.00%	125	10.97%	1,139
Todd	583	40.66%	826	57.60%	17	1.19%	4	0.28%	4	0.28%	-243	-16.94%	1,434
Tripp	1,980	51.87%	1,822	47.73%	8	0.21%	5	0.13%	2	0.05%	158	4.14%	3,817
Turner	2,694	58.34%	1,906	41.27%	16	0.35%	2	0.04%	0	0.00%	788	17.07%	4,618
Union	2,297	47.26%	2,540	52.26%	21	0.43%	2	0.04%	0	0.00%	-243	-5.00%	4,860
Walworth	2,187	58.66%	1,516	40.67%	19	0.51%	4	0.11%	2	0.05%	671	17.99%	3,728
Washabaugh	229	43.54%	276	52.47%	17	3.23%	4	0.76%	0	0.00%	-47	-8.93%	526
Yankton	4,029	49.82%	3,987	49.30%	49	0.61%	16	0.20%	6	0.07%	42	0.52%	8,087
Ziebach	369	48.49%	370	48.62%	15	1.97%	5	0.66%	2	0.26%	-1	-0.13%	761
Totals	151,505	50.39%	147,068	48.91%	1,619	0.54%	318	0.11%	168	0.06%	4,437	1.48%	300,678

==== Counties that flipped from Democratic to Republican ====
- Clay

==== Counties that flipped from Republican to Democratic ====
- Beadle
- Codington
- Corson
- Faulk
- Grant
- Gregory
- Jerauld
- Lake
- Spink
- Washabaugh
- Ziebach

== See also ==
- United States presidential elections in South Dakota
