= Potter County, South Dakota =

County in South Dakota, United States

- County
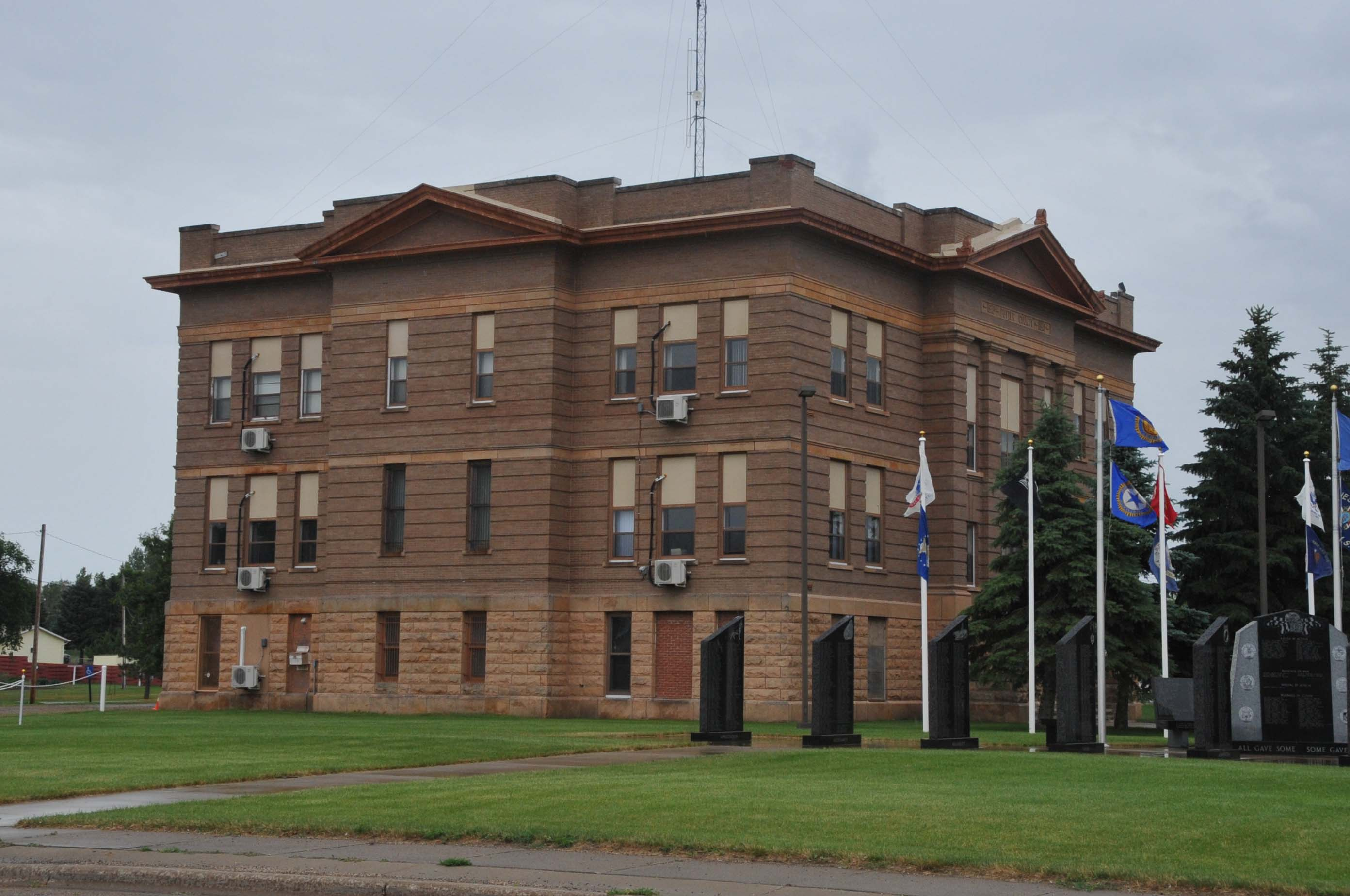
- Potter County Courthouse (July 2013)

- Location within the U.S. state of South Dakota
- Coordinates: 45°04′N 99°57′W
- Country: United States
- State: South Dakota
- Created: 1873
- Organized: 1883
- Named for: Joel A. Potter
- Seat: Gettysburg
- Largest city: Gettysburg

Area
  - Total: 899 sq mi (2,330 km^{2})
  - Land: 861 sq mi (2,230 km^{2})
  - Water: 38 sq mi (98 km^{2}) 4.2%

Population (2020)
  - Total: 2,472
  - Estimate (2025): 2,377 ▼
  - Density: 2.87/sq mi (1.11/km^{2})
- Time zone: UTC−6 (Central)
  - Summer (DST): UTC−5 (CDT)
- Congressional district: At-large

Potter County is a county in the U.S. state of South Dakota. As of the 2020 census, the population was 2,472. Its county seat is Gettysburg. The county was created in 1873 and organized in 1883.

== Geography ==
The Missouri River flows southward along the west boundary line of Potter County. The county terrain consists of rolling hills, mostly devoted to agriculture. The county generally slopes to the south, although the western portion slopes into the river valley. The county has a total area of 899 square miles (2,330 km^{2}), of which 861 square miles (2,230 km^{2}) is land and 38 square miles (98 km^{2}) (4.2%) is water.

The eastern portion of South Dakota's counties (48 of 66) observe Central Time; the western counties (18 of 66) observe Mountain Time. Potter County is the westernmost of the SD counties to observe Central Time.

=== Major highways ===
- U.S. Highway 83
- U.S. Highway 212
- South Dakota Highway 20
- South Dakota Highway 47
- South Dakota Highway 1804

=== Adjacent counties ===
- Walworth County – north
- Edmunds County – northeast
- Faulk County – east
- Hyde County – southeast
- Sully County – south
- Dewey County – west (observes Mountain Time)

=== Protected areas ===
- Dodge Draw State Game Production Area
- Dodge Draw State Lakeside Use Area
- East Whitlock State Lakeside Use Area
- Forest City State Game Production Area
- Green Lake State Game Production Area
- Potts Dam State Game Production Area
- Siebrasse State Game Production Area
- West Whitlock State Recreation Area
- Whitlocks Bay State Game Production Area

=== Lakes ===
- Green Lake
- Lake Hurley
- Lake Oahe (part)

== Demographics ==
Historical population
Census	Pop.	Note	%±
1890	2,910		—
1900	2,988		2.7%
1910	4,466		49.5%
1920	4,382		−1.9%
1930	5,762		31.5%
1940	4,614		−19.9%
1950	4,688		1.6%
1960	4,926		5.1%
1970	4,449		−9.7%
1980	3,674		−17.4%
1990	3,190		−13.2%
2000	2,693		−15.6%
2010	2,329		−13.5%
2020	2,472		6.1%
2025 (est.)	2,377	▼	−3.8%
U.S. Decennial Census; 1790–1960 1900–1990; 1990–2000 2010–2020

=== 2020 census ===
As of the 2020 census, there were 2,472 people, 1,127 households, and 753 families residing in the county. Of the residents, 19.5% were under the age of 18 and 30.7% were 65 years of age or older; the median age was 52.2 years. For every 100 females there were 99.0 males, and for every 100 females age 18 and over there were 97.5 males. The population density was 2.9 inhabitants per square mile (1.1/km^{2}).

The racial makeup of the county was 94.2% White, 0.2% Black or African American, 2.3% American Indian and Alaska Native, 0.6% Asian, 0.6% from some other race, and 2.1% from two or more races. Hispanic or Latino residents of any race comprised 1.6% of the population.

There were 1,127 households in the county, of which 23.1% had children under the age of 18 living with them and 20.1% had a female householder with no spouse or partner present. About 30.5% of all households were made up of individuals and 17.2% had someone living alone who was 65 years of age or older.

There were 1,569 housing units, of which 28.2% were vacant. Among occupied housing units, 74.4% were owner-occupied and 25.6% were renter-occupied. The homeowner vacancy rate was 2.9% and the rental vacancy rate was 11.3%.

=== 2010 census ===
As of the 2010 census, there were 2,329 people, 1,062 households, and 648 families in the county. The population density was 2.7 inhabitants per square mile (1.0/km^{2}). There were 1,500 housing units at an average density of 1.7 units per square mile (0.66 units/km^{2}). The racial makeup of the county was 97.6% white, 0.9% American Indian, 0.3% Asian, 0.1% black or African American, 0.2% from other races, and 0.9% from two or more races. Those of Hispanic or Latino origin made up 0.7% of the population. In terms of ancestry, 65.3% were German, 11.1% were Irish, 8.2% were Norwegian, 8.0% were English, and 3.9% were American.

Of the 1,062 households, 21.7% had children under the age of 18 living with them, 53.0% were married couples living together, 4.2% had a female householder with no husband present, 39.0% were non-families, and 35.5% of all households were made up of individuals. The average household size was 2.13 and the average family size was 2.76. The median age was 50.6 years.

The median income for a household in the county was $42,422 and the median income for a family was $53,214. Males had a median income of $33,750 versus $29,792 for females. The per capita income for the county was $23,986. About 5.4% of families and 10.0% of the population were below the poverty line, including 11.7% of those under age 18 and 10.8% of those age 65 or over.

== Communities ==
=== City ===
- Gettysburg (county seat)

=== Towns ===
- Hoven
- Lebanon
- Tolstoy

=== Unincorporated area ===
- Forest City

=== Unorganized territories ===
The county has no organized townships. It is divided into three areas of unorganized territory: West Potter, Central Potter, and East Potter.

== Politics ==
Like most of South Dakota outside of Native American counties, Potter County has been predominantly Republican throughout most of the state's history. Only three Democrats – William Jennings Bryan, Franklin D. Roosevelt and Lyndon Johnson – have carried the county as of 2024, and since Jimmy Carter in 1976 no Democrat has passed forty percent of the county's vote.

United States presidential election results for Potter County, South Dakota
Year	Republican		Democratic		Third party(ies)	
Year	No.	%	No.	%	No.	%
1892	320	51.12%	57	9.11%	249	39.78%
1896	333	45.74%	390	53.57%	5	0.69%
1900	375	47.95%	381	48.72%	26	3.32%
1904	525	62.80%	275	32.89%	36	4.31%
1908	614	58.09%	400	37.84%	43	4.07%
1912	0	0.00%	423	46.95%	478	53.05%
1916	512	54.58%	408	43.50%	18	1.92%
1920	1,073	72.30%	255	17.18%	156	10.51%
1924	1,075	59.82%	283	15.75%	439	24.43%
1928	1,240	52.77%	1,100	46.81%	10	0.43%
1932	660	28.09%	1,668	70.98%	22	0.94%
1936	914	39.64%	1,338	58.02%	54	2.34%
1940	1,278	54.80%	1,054	45.20%	0	0.00%
1944	1,001	58.27%	717	41.73%	0	0.00%
1948	1,044	49.69%	1,039	49.45%	18	0.86%
1952	1,625	73.73%	579	26.27%	0	0.00%
1956	1,445	63.16%	843	36.84%	0	0.00%
1960	1,326	56.91%	1,004	43.09%	0	0.00%
1964	954	43.09%	1,260	56.91%	0	0.00%
1968	1,273	57.81%	780	35.42%	149	6.77%
1972	1,389	61.65%	858	38.08%	6	0.27%
1976	1,136	55.36%	908	44.25%	8	0.39%
1980	1,633	75.29%	436	20.10%	100	4.61%
1984	1,551	76.22%	482	23.69%	2	0.10%
1988	1,175	62.07%	701	37.03%	17	0.90%
1992	901	50.67%	493	27.73%	384	21.60%
1996	979	57.52%	534	31.37%	189	11.10%
2000	1,112	74.43%	356	23.83%	26	1.74%
2004	1,143	70.64%	463	28.62%	12	0.74%
2008	937	65.07%	482	33.47%	21	1.46%
2012	1,029	74.51%	339	24.55%	13	0.94%
2016	1,071	80.10%	215	16.08%	51	3.81%
2020	1,139	82.54%	227	16.45%	14	1.01%
2024	1,059	81.59%	214	16.49%	25	1.93%

== See also ==
- National Register of Historic Places listings in Potter County, South Dakota
- Herman Malchow
