= Mellette County, South Dakota =

County in South Dakota, United States

- County
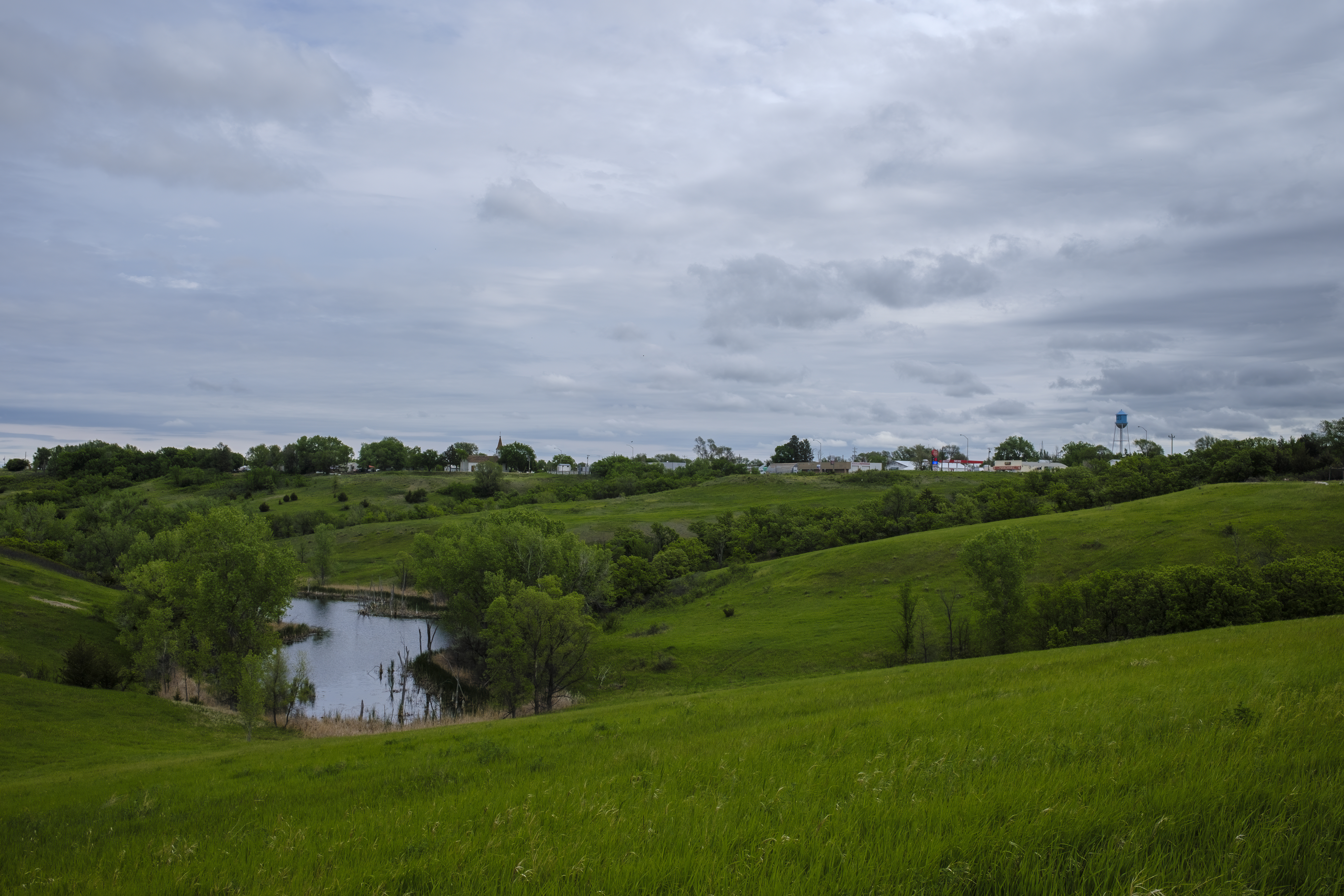
- White River from the West, the county seat

- Location within the U.S. state of South Dakota
- Coordinates: 43°34′52.802″N 100°45′18.756″W
- Country: United States
- State: South Dakota
- Created: 1909
- Organized: 1911
- Named for: Arthur C. Mellette
- Seat: White River
- Largest city: White River

Area
  - Total: 1,311 sq mi (3,400 km^{2})
  - Land: 1,307 sq mi (3,390 km^{2})
  - Water: 3.6 sq mi (9.3 km^{2}) 0.3%

Population (2020)
  - Total: 1,918
  - Estimate (2025): 2,137 ▲
  - Density: 1.467/sq mi (0.5666/km^{2})
- Time zone: UTC−6 (Central)
  - Summer (DST): UTC−5 (CDT)
- Congressional district: At-large
- Website: mellette.sdcounty.gov

Mellette County is a county in the U.S. state of South Dakota. As of the 2020 census, the population was 1,918. Its county seat is White River. The county was created in 1909, and was organized in 1911. It was named for Arthur C. Mellette, the last Governor of the Dakota Territory and the first Governor of the state of South Dakota.

Historically territory of the Sioux/Lakota peoples, 33.35 percent of the county's land is trust land associated with the Rosebud Indian Reservation in the neighboring county to the south. According to the 2000 United States census, 52.2% of the population is Native American, mostly the federally recognized Sicangu Oyate (Upper Brulé Sioux) and the Rosebud Sioux Tribe, a branch of the Lakota people.

== Geography ==
The White River flows eastward along the north boundary line of Mellette County. The Little White River flows northward through central Mellette County, discharging into White River. The terrain consists of semi-arid rolling hills, the northern portion dotted with ponds and small lakes. The area is mostly devoted to agriculture. The terrain slopes to the northeast; its highest point is the SW corner at 2,779 ft (847 m) ASL. The county has a total area of 1,311 square miles (3,400 km^{2}), of which 1,307 square miles (3,390 km^{2}) is land and 3.6 square miles (9.3 km^{2}) (0.3%) is water.

The eastern portion of South Dakota's counties (48 of 66) observe Central Time; the western counties (18 of 66) observe Mountain Time. Mellette County is the westernmost of the SD counties to observe Central Time.

=== Major highways ===
- U.S. Highway 83
- South Dakota Highway 44
- South Dakota Highway 53
- South Dakota Highway 63

=== Adjacent counties ===
- Jones County – north
- Lyman County – northeast
- Tripp County – east
- Todd County – south
- Bennett County – southwest (observes Mountain Time)
- Jackson County – west (observes Mountain Time)

== Demographics ==
Historical population
Census	Pop.	Note	%±
1910	1,700		—
1920	3,850		126.5%
1930	5,293		37.5%
1940	4,107		−22.4%
1950	3,046		−25.8%
1960	2,664		−12.5%
1970	2,420		−9.2%
1980	2,249		−7.1%
1990	2,137		−5.0%
2000	2,083		−2.5%
2010	2,048		−1.7%
2020	1,918		−6.3%
2025 (est.)	2,137	▲	11.4%
U.S. Decennial Census; 1790–1960 1900–1990; 1990–2000 2010–2020

=== 2020 census ===
As of the 2020 census, there were 1,918 people, 651 households, and 419 families residing in the county; the population density was 1.5 inhabitants per square mile (0.58/km^{2}) and there were 775 housing units.

Of the residents, 33.0% were under the age of 18 and 16.5% were 65 years of age or older; the median age was 34.8 years. For every 100 females there were 103.4 males, and for every 100 females age 18 and over there were 102.7 males. 0.0% of residents lived in urban areas and 100.0% lived in rural areas.

The racial makeup of the county was 34.2% White, 0.1% Black or African American, 58.0% American Indian and Alaska Native, 0.2% Asian, 0.5% from some other race, and 7.1% from two or more races. Hispanic or Latino residents of any race comprised 2.0% of the population.

Of the 651 households, 35.8% had children under the age of 18 living with them and 28.0% had a female householder with no spouse or partner present. About 28.5% of all households were made up of individuals and 12.8% had someone living alone who was 65 years of age or older.

There were 775 housing units, of which 16.0% were vacant. Among occupied housing units, 68.8% were owner-occupied and 31.2% were renter-occupied. The homeowner vacancy rate was 1.5% and the rental vacancy rate was 4.2%.

=== 2010 census ===
As of the 2010 census, there were 2,048 people, 693 households, and 493 families in the county. The population density was 1.6 inhabitants per square mile (0.62/km^{2}). There were 838 housing units at an average density of 0.6 units per square mile (0.23 units/km^{2}). The racial makeup of the county was 54.1% American Indian, 39.7% white, 0.2% Asian, 0.1% black or African American, 0.2% from other races, and 5.6% from two or more races. Those of Hispanic or Latino origin made up 1.5% of the population. In terms of ancestry, 25.6% were German, 8.4% were Irish, 6.1% were English, and 0.6% were American.

Of the 693 households, 41.6% had children under the age of 18 living with them, 43.3% were married couples living together, 19.0% had a female householder with no husband present, 28.9% were non-families, and 24.7% of all households were made up of individuals. The average household size was 2.88 and the average family size was 3.38. The median age was 34.2 years.

The median income for a household in the county was $34,055 and the median income for a family was $35,781. Males had a median income of $31,625 versus $30,956 for females. The per capita income for the county was $16,971. About 23.4% of families and 27.0% of the population were below the poverty line, including 40.5% of those under age 18 and 6.3% of those age 65 or over.

== Communities ==
=== City ===
- White River (county seat)

=== Town ===
- Wood

=== Census-designated places ===
- Corn Creek
- Horse Creek
- Norris

=== Unincorporated communities ===
- Mosher

=== Townships ===
- Bad Nation
- Blackpipe
- Butte
- Cody
- Fairview
- Mosher
- New Surprise Valley
- Norris
- Prospect
- Red Fish
- Ring Thunder
- Riverside
- Rocky Ford
- Rosebud
- Running Bird
- Surprise Valley

=== Unorganized territories ===
- Cedarbutte
- Central Mellette.

== Politics ==
Like most of South Dakota, Mellette County is solidly Republican. It has not been carried by a Democrat since Lyndon Johnson’s 1964 landslide, although Barack Obama came within six votes of doing so in the 2012 election.

United States presidential election results for Mellette County, South Dakota
Year	Republican		Democratic		Third party(ies)	
Year	No.	%	No.	%	No.	%
1912	0	0.00%	320	53.96%	273	46.04%
1916	379	45.55%	436	52.40%	17	2.04%
1920	533	63.53%	261	31.11%	45	5.36%
1924	642	39.93%	604	37.56%	362	22.51%
1928	943	50.13%	927	49.28%	11	0.58%
1932	657	29.14%	1,583	70.20%	15	0.67%
1936	711	46.56%	808	52.91%	8	0.52%
1940	990	52.24%	905	47.76%	0	0.00%
1944	544	57.02%	410	42.98%	0	0.00%
1948	482	49.33%	482	49.33%	13	1.33%
1952	787	69.40%	347	30.60%	0	0.00%
1956	643	55.29%	520	44.71%	0	0.00%
1960	774	60.28%	510	39.72%	0	0.00%
1964	525	44.38%	658	55.62%	0	0.00%
1968	611	55.70%	407	37.10%	79	7.20%
1972	637	59.20%	433	40.24%	6	0.56%
1976	508	53.53%	429	45.21%	12	1.26%
1980	624	64.80%	279	28.97%	60	6.23%
1984	616	66.45%	303	32.69%	8	0.86%
1988	460	53.99%	385	45.19%	7	0.82%
1992	417	49.58%	277	32.94%	147	17.48%
1996	417	52.26%	302	37.84%	79	9.90%
2000	495	67.53%	222	30.29%	16	2.18%
2004	553	59.40%	361	38.78%	17	1.83%
2008	445	52.79%	373	44.25%	25	2.97%
2012	381	49.54%	375	48.76%	13	1.69%
2016	402	58.86%	238	34.85%	43	6.30%
2020	449	58.39%	298	38.75%	22	2.86%
2024	434	58.65%	285	38.51%	21	2.84%

== See also ==
The Geography, Geology and Biology of Mellett, Washabaugh, Bennett and Todd Counties, South-Central South Dakota

- National Register of Historic Places listings in Mellette County, South Dakota
