= 2024 United States presidential election in South Dakota =

- November 5, 2024
- Turnout: 69.93% (of registered voters) ▼3.96 pp 62% (of voting age population) ▼1.41 pp

Nominee	Donald Trump	Kamala Harris
Party	Republican	Democratic
Home state	Florida	California
Running mate	JD Vance	Tim Walz
Electoral vote	3	0
Popular vote	272,081	146,859
Percentage	63.43%	34.24%

Trump
40–50%
50–60%
60–70%
70–80%
80–90%
90–100%
Harris
40–50%
50–60%
60–70%
70–80%
80–90%
90–100%
Tie/No data
President before election
Joe Biden
Democratic
Elected President
Donald Trump
Republican

The 2024 United States presidential election in South Dakota took place on Tuesday, November 5, 2024, as part of the 2024 United States presidential election in which all 50 states plus the District of Columbia participated. South Dakota voters chose electors to represent them in the Electoral College via a popular vote. The state of South Dakota has three electoral votes in the Electoral College, following reapportionment due to the 2020 United States census in which the state neither gained nor lost a seat.

Republican Donald Trump carried the state by 29.8% in 2016 and again by 26.2% four years later. Trump won the state by 29.2% in 2024. Trump flipped back Ziebach County, which he won in 2016 but lost to Biden in 2020.

== Primary elections ==
=== Democratic primary ===
The South Dakota Democratic primary was held on June 4, 2024, alongside primaries in the District of Columbia, Montana, New Jersey, and New Mexico.

=== Republican primary ===
The South Dakota Republican primary was held on June 4, 2024, alongside primaries in Montana, New Jersey, and New Mexico. Under state law, no primary will be held if a candidate runs for a nomination unopposed. As Donald Trump was the only Republican candidate to file for the presidential primary, no popular vote was held.

== General election ==
=== Predictions ===
Source	Ranking	As of
Cook Political Report	Solid R	December 19, 2023
Inside Elections	Solid R	April 26, 2023
Sabato's Crystal Ball	Safe R	June 29, 2023
Decision Desk HQ/The Hill	Safe R	December 14, 2023
CNalysis	Solid R	December 30, 2023
CNN	Solid R	January 14, 2024
The Economist	Safe R	June 12, 2024
538	Solid R	June 11, 2024
RCP	Solid R	June 26, 2024
NBC News	Safe R	October 6, 2024

=== Polling ===
Donald Trump vs. Kamala Harris

Poll source	Date(s) administered	Sample size (Note: Key: A – all adults RV – registered voters LV – likely voters V – unclear)	Margin of error	Donald Trump Republican	Kamala Harris Democratic	Other / Undecided
Emerson College	October 19–22, 2024	825 (LV)	± 3.3%	62%	35%	3% (Note: "Someone else" with 2%)
Emerson College	October 19–22, 2024	825 (LV)	± 3.3%	62% (Note: With voters who lean towards a given candidate)	37%	1% (Note: "Someone else" with 1%)

Hypothetical polling with Donald Trump and Joe Biden

Donald Trump vs. Joe Biden

Poll source	Date(s) administered	Sample size	Margin of error	Donald Trump Republican	Joe Biden Democratic	Other / Undecided
John Zogby Strategies (Note: Poll conducted for Kennedy's campaign)	April 13–21, 2024	303 (LV)	–	60%	32%	8%
Emerson College	January 23–28, 2024	1,777 (RV)	± 2.2%	55%	26%	18%
Emerson College	October 1–4, 2023	432 (RV)	± 4.7%	50%	28%	22%
Emerson College (Note: Poll sponsored by KELO-TV)	October 19–21, 2022	1,500 (LV)	± 2.4%	53%	33%	14%

Donald Trump vs. Joe Biden vs. Robert F. Kennedy Jr.

Poll source	Date(s) administered	Sample size	Margin of error	Donald Trump Republican	Joe Biden Democratic	Robert Kennedy Jr Independent	Other / Undecided
Mason-Dixon (Note: Poll sponsored by South Dakota News Watch & Chiesman Center for Democracy at the University of South Dakota)	May 10–13, 2024	500 (RV)	± 4.5%	50%	31%	11%	8%

Hypothetical polling with other candidates

Donald Trump vs. Robert F. Kennedy Jr.

Poll source	Date(s) administered	Sample size	Margin of error	Donald Trump Republican	Robert Kennedy Jr. Independent	Other / Undecided
John Zogby Strategies	April 13–21, 2024	303 (LV)	–	51%	38%	11%

Robert F. Kennedy Jr. vs. Joe Biden

Poll source	Date(s) administered	Sample size	Margin of error	Robert Kennedy Jr. Independent	Joe Biden Democratic	Other / Undecided
John Zogby Strategies	April 13–21, 2024	303 (LV)	–	53%	33%	14%

=== Results ===
State House district results: Trump 40–50% 50–60% 60–70% 70–80% 80–90% / Harris 50–60% 60–70%

2024 United States presidential election in South Dakota
Party	Candidate	Votes	%	±%
Republican	Donald Trump; JD Vance	272,081	63.43%	▲1.66%
Democratic	Kamala Harris; Tim Walz	146,859	34.24%	▼1.37%
Independent	Robert F. Kennedy Jr. (withdrawn); Nicole Shanahan (withdrawn)	7,204	1.68%	N/A
Libertarian	Chase Oliver; Mike ter Maat	2,778	0.65%	▼1.98%
Total votes		428,922	100.00%	N/A

==== By county ====
County	Donald Trump Republican		Kamala Harris Democratic		Various candidates Other parties		Margin		Total
County	#	%	#	%	#	%	#	%	Total
Aurora	1,056	75.81%	302	21.68%	35	2.51%	754	54.13%	1,393
Beadle	4,826	68.84%	2,017	28.77%	167	2.38%	2,809	40.07%	7,010
Bennett	676	62.13%	389	35.75%	23	2.11%	287	26.38%	1,088
Bon Homme	2,236	74.73%	697	23.30%	59	1.97%	1,539	51.44%	2,992
Brookings	8,575	57.40%	5,978	40.02%	386	2.58%	2,597	17.38%	14,939
Brown	10,645	62.46%	6,075	35.65%	323	1.90%	4,570	26.81%	17,043
Brule	1,694	69.91%	666	27.49%	63	2.60%	1,028	42.43%	2,423
Buffalo	164	35.19%	291	62.45%	11	2.36%	-127	-27.25%	466
Butte	4,024	79.18%	942	18.54%	116	2.28%	3,082	60.65%	5,082
Campbell	706	84.45%	120	14.35%	10	1.20%	586	70.10%	836
Charles Mix	2,551	70.57%	1,000	27.66%	64	1.77%	1,551	42.90%	3,615
Clark	1,382	75.03%	415	22.53%	45	2.44%	967	52.50%	1,842
Clay	2,574	45.50%	2,944	52.04%	139	2.46%	-370	-6.54%	5,657
Codington	9,349	69.20%	3,840	28.42%	321	2.38%	5,509	40.78%	13,510
Corson	631	55.21%	495	43.31%	17	1.49%	136	11.90%	1,143
Custer	4,313	71.87%	1,567	26.11%	121	2.02%	2,746	45.76%	6,001
Davison	6,208	67.65%	2,743	29.89%	226	2.46%	3,465	37.76%	9,177
Day	1,876	63.98%	1,000	34.11%	56	1.91%	876	29.88%	2,932
Deuel	1,717	74.72%	528	22.98%	53	2.31%	1,189	51.74%	2,298
Dewey	793	42.38%	1,032	55.16%	46	2.46%	-239	-12.77%	1,871
Douglas	1,419	85.59%	219	13.21%	20	1.21%	1,200	72.38%	1,658
Edmunds	1,618	79.67%	384	18.91%	29	1.43%	1,234	60.76%	2,031
Fall River	3,135	73.35%	1,030	24.10%	109	2.55%	2,105	49.25%	4,274
Faulk	920	81.42%	183	16.19%	27	2.39%	737	65.22%	1,130
Grant	2,594	71.46%	946	26.06%	90	2.48%	1,648	45.40%	3,630
Gregory	1,790	78.96%	426	18.79%	51	2.25%	1,364	60.17%	2,267
Haakon	1,004	89.24%	105	9.33%	16	1.42%	899	79.91%	1,125
Hamlin	2,560	79.36%	610	18.91%	56	1.74%	1,950	60.45%	3,226
Hand	1,376	78.00%	365	20.69%	23	1.30%	1,011	57.31%	1,764
Hanson	1,611	78.74%	399	19.50%	36	1.76%	1,212	59.24%	2,046
Harding	754	91.95%	48	5.85%	18	2.20%	706	86.10%	820
Hughes	5,379	63.77%	2,838	33.65%	218	2.58%	2,541	30.12%	8,435
Hutchinson	2,918	78.10%	755	20.21%	63	1.69%	2,163	57.90%	3,736
Hyde	530	76.26%	148	21.29%	17	2.45%	382	54.96%	695
Jackson	753	66.70%	357	31.62%	19	1.68%	396	35.08%	1,129
Jerauld	708	70.87%	276	27.63%	15	1.50%	432	43.24%	999
Jones	477	86.73%	60	10.91%	13	2.36%	417	75.82%	550
Kingsbury	1,989	71.01%	760	27.13%	52	1.86%	1,229	43.88%	2,801
Lake	3,819	64.66%	1,978	33.49%	109	1.85%	1,841	31.17%	5,906
Lawrence	9,904	64.27%	5,074	32.93%	431	2.80%	4,830	31.35%	15,409
Lincoln	22,621	62.16%	12,981	35.67%	791	2.17%	9,640	26.49%	36,393
Lyman	993	68.62%	422	29.16%	32	2.21%	571	39.46%	1,447
Marshall	1,288	61.07%	782	37.08%	39	1.85%	506	23.99%	2,109
McCook	2,227	73.47%	733	24.18%	71	2.34%	1,494	49.29%	3,031
McPherson	1,087	83.68%	188	14.47%	24	1.85%	899	69.21%	1,299
Meade	10,887	74.20%	3,421	23.32%	364	2.48%	7,466	50.89%	14,672
Mellette	434	58.65%	285	38.51%	21	2.84%	149	20.14%	740
Miner	841	72.07%	293	25.11%	33	2.83%	548	46.96%	1,167
Minnehaha	51,842	55.16%	39,923	42.48%	2,221	2.36%	11,919	12.68%	93,986
Moody	2,068	64.85%	1,052	32.99%	69	2.16%	1,016	31.86%	3,189
Oglala Lakota	406	13.26%	2,567	83.83%	89	2.91%	-2,161	-70.57%	3,062
Pennington	35,009	61.88%	20,051	35.44%	1,520	2.69%	14,958	26.44%	56,580
Perkins	1,342	84.35%	228	14.33%	21	1.32%	1,114	70.02%	1,591
Potter	1,059	81.59%	214	16.49%	25	1.93%	845	65.10%	1,298
Roberts	2,514	60.59%	1,560	37.60%	75	1.81%	954	22.99%	4,149
Sanborn	929	76.65%	259	21.37%	24	1.98%	670	55.28%	1,212
Spink	2,145	68.33%	921	29.34%	73	2.33%	1,224	38.99%	3,139
Stanley	1,260	72.62%	447	25.76%	28	1.61%	813	46.86%	1,735
Sully	716	79.47%	168	18.65%	17	1.89%	548	60.82%	901
Todd	497	23.38%	1,570	73.85%	59	2.78%	-1,073	-50.47%	2,126
Tripp	2,150	81.01%	470	17.71%	34	1.28%	1,680	63.30%	2,654
Turner	3,374	74.35%	1,044	23.01%	120	2.64%	2,330	51.34%	4,538
Union	6,160	69.40%	2,548	28.71%	168	1.89%	3,612	40.69%	8,876
Walworth	1,940	78.67%	481	19.51%	45	1.82%	1,459	59.16%	2,466
Yankton	6,650	61.39%	3,883	35.85%	299	2.76%	2,767	25.54%	10,832
Ziebach	388	49.68%	366	46.86%	27	3.46%	22	2.82%	781
Totals	272,081	63.43%	146,859	34.24%	9,982	2.33%	125,222	29.19%	428,922

==== County that flipped from Democratic to Republican ====
- Ziebach (largest city: Dupree)

==== By congressional district ====
South Dakota has only one congressional district because of its small population compared to other states. This district, called the at-large district because it covers the entire state, is equivalent to the statewide election results.

District	Trump	Harris	Representative
At-large	63.43%	34.24%	Dusty Johnson

== See also ==
- United States presidential elections in South Dakota
- 2024 United States presidential election
- 2024 Democratic Party presidential primaries
- 2024 Republican Party presidential primaries
- 2024 United States elections

== Notes ==
Partisan clients
