= 1928 United States presidential election in South Dakota =

- November 6, 1928

Nominee	Herbert Hoover	Al Smith
Party	Republican	Democratic
Home state	California	New York
Running mate	Charles Curtis	Joseph T. Robinson
Electoral vote	5	0
Popular vote	157,603	102,660
Percentage	60.18%	39.20%
County results
Hoover
50–60%
60–70%
70–80%
Smith
50–60%
90–100%
President before election
Calvin Coolidge
Republican
Elected President
Herbert Hoover
Republican

The 1928 United States presidential election in South Dakota took place on November 6, 1928, as part of the 1928 United States presidential election which was held throughout all contemporary 48 states. Voters chose five representatives, or electors to the Electoral College, who voted for president and vice president.

Ever since statehood South Dakota had been solidly Republican apart from when supporting Populist-backed William Jennings Bryan by an exceedingly narrow 0.22% margin in 1896. However, the state had been one of the strongest for insurgent Robert M. La Follette senior in 1924, and after La Follette died six months following that election his family would endorse New York City Catholic Democrat Al Smith rather than any Republican.

In the more Catholic states of North Dakota and Wisconsin, this endorsement would have a major effect in reviving a largely moribund Democratic Party at a presidential level, although it was not adequate to give Smith those states’ electoral votes. In less Catholic and more Yankee-settled and Methodist South Dakota, anti-Catholicism was a powerful force in most areas and as a result Smith's gain on Davis’ vote was much less, with the exception of a few powerfully pro-La Follette German Lutheran counties whose voters were lured by Smith's opposition to Prohibition. Armstrong County, a sparsely populated part of an Indian reservation, cast all 7 of its votes for Smith, setting a record for the nation. Smith was the first ever Democrat to win McPherson County, but South Dakota still voted for Republican nominee Herbert Hoover by a margin of 20.98%, which made it 3.56% more Republican than the nation at-large in a major landslide.

== Results ==
Presidential Candidate	Running Mate	Party	Electoral Vote (EV)	Popular Vote (PV)	
Herbert Hoover of California	Charles Curtis	Republican	157,603	60.18%	5
Al Smith	Joseph T. Robinson	Democratic	102,660	39.20%	0
Frank Webb	Will Vereen	Farm Labor	927	0.35%	0
Norman Thomas	James Maurer	Socialist	443	0.17%	0
William Z. Foster	Benjamin Gitlow	Workers	232	0.09%	0

=== Results by county ===
County	Herbert Hoover Republican		Al Smith Democratic		Frank E. Webb Farm Labor		Norman Thomas Socialist		William Z. Foster Workers		Margin		Total votes cast
County	#	%	#	%	#	%	#	%	#	%	#	%	Total votes cast
Armstrong	0	0.00%	7	100.00%	0	0.00%	0	0.00%	0	0.00%	-7	-100.00%	7
Aurora	1,552	51.72%	1,426	47.52%	14	0.47%	7	0.23%	2	0.07%	126	4.20%	3,001
Beadle	5,094	61.43%	3,168	38.20%	17	0.20%	12	0.14%	2	0.02%	1,926	23.22%	8,293
Bennett	766	58.16%	544	41.31%	4	0.30%	2	0.15%	1	0.08%	222	16.86%	1,317
Bon Homme	2,262	50.93%	2,166	48.77%	6	0.14%	7	0.16%	0	0.00%	96	2.16%	4,441
Brookings	4,586	70.05%	1,915	29.25%	42	0.64%	4	0.06%	0	0.00%	2,671	40.80%	6,547
Brown	7,266	58.03%	5,065	40.45%	67	0.54%	48	0.38%	76	0.61%	2,201	17.58%	12,522
Brule	1,431	46.46%	1,599	51.92%	15	0.49%	28	0.91%	7	0.23%	-168	-5.45%	3,080
Buffalo	405	51.01%	387	48.74%	2	0.25%	0	0.00%	0	0.00%	18	2.27%	794
Butte	1,988	69.36%	840	29.31%	11	0.38%	6	0.21%	21	0.73%	1,148	40.06%	2,866
Campbell	1,346	69.13%	588	30.20%	8	0.41%	4	0.21%	1	0.05%	758	38.93%	1,947
Charles Mix	3,087	50.28%	3,039	49.50%	6	0.10%	2	0.03%	6	0.10%	48	0.78%	6,140
Clark	2,665	65.46%	1,370	33.65%	30	0.74%	5	0.12%	1	0.02%	1,295	31.81%	4,071
Clay	2,573	63.42%	1,474	36.33%	10	0.25%	0	0.00%	0	0.00%	1,099	27.09%	4,057
Codington	3,762	53.08%	3,299	46.55%	21	0.30%	4	0.06%	1	0.01%	463	6.53%	7,087
Corson	1,847	56.92%	1,374	42.34%	11	0.34%	10	0.31%	3	0.09%	473	14.58%	3,245
Custer	1,464	66.85%	715	32.65%	9	0.41%	2	0.09%	0	0.00%	749	34.20%	2,190
Davison	3,821	58.15%	2,729	41.53%	12	0.18%	9	0.14%	0	0.00%	1,092	16.62%	6,571
Day	3,180	54.22%	2,642	45.05%	28	0.48%	11	0.19%	4	0.07%	538	9.17%	5,865
Deuel	1,869	64.40%	999	34.42%	22	0.76%	9	0.31%	3	0.10%	870	29.98%	2,902
Dewey	1,293	56.39%	996	43.44%	2	0.09%	2	0.09%	0	0.00%	297	12.95%	2,293
Douglas	1,949	68.68%	879	30.97%	6	0.21%	2	0.07%	2	0.07%	1,070	37.70%	2,838
Edmunds	1,743	51.95%	1,597	47.60%	7	0.21%	5	0.15%	3	0.09%	146	4.35%	3,355
Fall River	2,216	63.51%	1,258	36.06%	9	0.26%	6	0.17%	0	0.00%	958	27.46%	3,489
Faulk	1,907	62.46%	1,135	37.18%	3	0.10%	6	0.20%	2	0.07%	772	25.29%	3,053
Grant	2,508	59.49%	1,656	39.28%	29	0.69%	17	0.40%	6	0.14%	852	20.21%	4,216
Gregory	2,274	53.04%	2,001	46.68%	10	0.23%	2	0.05%	0	0.00%	273	6.37%	4,287
Haakon	1,255	64.33%	663	33.98%	25	1.28%	6	0.31%	2	0.10%	592	30.34%	1,951
Hamlin	1,959	63.19%	1,088	35.10%	34	1.10%	5	0.16%	14	0.45%	871	28.10%	3,100
Hand	2,430	63.26%	1,397	36.37%	7	0.18%	7	0.18%	0	0.00%	1,033	26.89%	3,841
Hanson	1,576	58.13%	1,129	41.65%	3	0.11%	3	0.11%	0	0.00%	447	16.49%	2,711
Harding	1,032	72.78%	368	25.95%	12	0.85%	3	0.21%	3	0.21%	664	46.83%	1,418
Hughes	1,912	61.56%	1,171	37.70%	16	0.52%	4	0.13%	3	0.10%	741	23.86%	3,106
Hutchinson	2,145	52.61%	1,898	46.55%	26	0.64%	2	0.05%	6	0.15%	247	6.06%	4,077
Hyde	960	60.80%	608	38.51%	7	0.44%	3	0.19%	1	0.06%	352	22.29%	1,579
Jackson	704	62.63%	417	37.10%	2	0.18%	1	0.09%	0	0.00%	287	25.53%	1,124
Jerauld	1,517	62.69%	875	36.16%	15	0.62%	13	0.54%	0	0.00%	642	26.53%	2,420
Jones	857	66.43%	422	32.71%	5	0.39%	5	0.39%	1	0.08%	435	33.72%	1,290
Kingsbury	3,499	71.88%	1,352	27.77%	15	0.31%	2	0.04%	0	0.00%	2,147	44.10%	4,868
Lake	3,048	63.41%	1,744	36.28%	15	0.31%	0	0.00%	0	0.00%	1,304	27.13%	4,807
Lawrence	4,141	69.63%	1,785	30.02%	17	0.29%	4	0.07%	0	0.00%	2,356	39.62%	5,947
Lincoln	3,463	71.40%	1,364	28.12%	14	0.29%	9	0.19%	0	0.00%	2,099	43.28%	4,850
Lyman	1,488	54.75%	1,222	44.96%	5	0.18%	3	0.11%	0	0.00%	266	9.79%	2,718
Marshall	1,858	57.13%	1,315	40.44%	73	2.24%	4	0.12%	2	0.06%	543	16.70%	3,252
McCook	2,234	55.78%	1,758	43.90%	10	0.25%	3	0.07%	0	0.00%	476	11.89%	4,005
McPherson	1,234	45.52%	1,468	54.15%	6	0.22%	2	0.07%	1	0.04%	-234	-8.63%	2,711
Meade	2,845	66.04%	1,441	33.45%	11	0.26%	10	0.23%	1	0.02%	1,404	32.59%	4,308
Mellette	943	50.13%	927	49.28%	5	0.27%	6	0.32%	0	0.00%	16	0.85%	1,881
Miner	1,990	59.37%	1,341	40.01%	13	0.39%	7	0.21%	1	0.03%	649	19.36%	3,352
Minnehaha	13,741	66.68%	6,805	33.02%	35	0.17%	20	0.10%	7	0.03%	6,936	33.66%	20,608
Moody	2,108	59.63%	1,416	40.06%	5	0.14%	4	0.11%	2	0.06%	692	19.58%	3,535
Pennington	4,645	66.97%	2,266	32.67%	9	0.13%	10	0.14%	6	0.09%	2,379	34.30%	6,936
Perkins	2,262	68.57%	1,010	30.62%	12	0.36%	11	0.33%	4	0.12%	1,252	37.95%	3,299
Potter	1,240	52.77%	1,100	46.81%	6	0.26%	2	0.09%	2	0.09%	140	5.96%	2,350
Roberts	2,966	52.73%	2,619	46.56%	26	0.46%	7	0.12%	7	0.12%	347	6.17%	5,625
Sanborn	1,576	54.08%	1,321	45.33%	12	0.41%	4	0.14%	1	0.03%	255	8.75%	2,914
Shannon	469	43.63%	601	55.91%	2	0.19%	3	0.28%	0	0.00%	-132	-12.28%	1,075
Spink	3,868	60.89%	2,451	38.59%	16	0.25%	14	0.22%	3	0.05%	1,417	22.31%	6,352
Stanley	736	62.32%	437	37.00%	1	0.08%	6	0.51%	1	0.08%	299	25.32%	1,181
Sully	999	70.50%	415	29.29%	3	0.21%	0	0.00%	0	0.00%	584	41.21%	1,417
Todd	789	48.43%	831	51.01%	7	0.43%	2	0.12%	0	0.00%	-42	-2.58%	1,629
Tripp	2,396	53.02%	2,099	46.45%	10	0.22%	14	0.31%	0	0.00%	297	6.57%	4,519
Turner	3,362	70.65%	1,380	29.00%	10	0.21%	5	0.11%	2	0.04%	1,982	41.65%	4,759
Union	2,415	53.19%	2,106	46.39%	5	0.11%	9	0.20%	5	0.11%	309	6.81%	4,540
Walworth	1,854	59.96%	1,216	39.33%	15	0.49%	5	0.16%	2	0.06%	638	20.63%	3,092
Washabaugh	294	50.69%	282	48.62%	3	0.52%	1	0.17%	0	0.00%	12	2.07%	580
Washington	205	47.34%	228	52.66%	0	0.00%	0	0.00%	0	0.00%	-23	-5.31%	433
Yankton	2,971	50.88%	2,841	48.66%	14	0.24%	9	0.15%	4	0.07%	130	2.23%	5,839
Ziebach	759	55.00%	615	44.57%	2	0.14%	3	0.22%	1	0.07%	144	10.43%	1,380
Totals	157,603	60.19%	102,660	39.20%	927	0.35%	443	0.17%	224	0.09%	54,943	20.98%	261,857

== See also ==
- United States presidential elections in South Dakota
