= 1940 United States presidential election in South Dakota =

- November 5, 1940

All 4 South Dakota votes to the Electoral College

Nominee	Wendell Willkie	Franklin D. Roosevelt
Party	Republican	Democratic
Home state	New York	New York
Running mate	Charles L. McNary	Henry A. Wallace
Electoral vote	4	0
Popular vote	177,065	131,362
Percentage	57.41%	42.59%
County results
Willkie
50–60%
60–70%
70–80%
80–90%
Roosevelt
50–60%
President before election
Franklin D. Roosevelt
Democratic
Elected President
Franklin D. Roosevelt
Democratic

The 1940 United States presidential election in South Dakota took place on November 5, 1940, as part of the 1940 United States presidential election. Voters chose four representatives, or electors, to the Electoral College, who voted for president and vice president.

South Dakota was won by Wendell Willkie (R–New York), running with Minority Leader Charles L. McNary, with 57.41% of the popular vote, against incumbent President Franklin D. Roosevelt (D–New York), running with Secretary Henry A. Wallace, with 42.59% of the popular vote.

South Dakota would prove to be Willkie's largest win of any state, as he carried the state by 14.82 percentage points, despite Roosevelt carrying it by 12 percentage points four years prior. Additionally, with 57.41% of the popular vote, South Dakota was Willkie's strongest state in the 1940 election in terms of popular vote percentage.

== Results ==
1940 United States presidential election in South Dakota
Party	Candidate	Votes	%
Republican	Wendell Willkie	177,065	57.41%
Democratic	Franklin D. Roosevelt (inc.)	131,362	42.59%
Total votes		308,427	100%

=== Results by county ===
County	Wendell Lewis Willkie Republican		Franklin Delano Roosevelt Democratic		Margin		Total votes cast
County	#	%	#	%	#	%	Total votes cast
Aurora	1,408	50.41%	1,385	49.59%	23	0.82%	2,793
Beadle	4,356	45.33%	5,253	54.67%	-897	-9.33%	9,609
Bennett	915	51.55%	860	48.45%	55	3.10%	1,775
Bon Homme	3,046	55.29%	2,463	44.71%	583	10.58%	5,509
Brookings	5,016	65.25%	2,671	34.75%	2,345	30.51%	7,687
Brown	6,598	45.05%	8,048	54.95%	-1,450	-9.90%	14,646
Brule	1,352	42.42%	1,835	57.58%	-483	-15.16%	3,187
Buffalo	491	55.42%	395	44.58%	96	10.84%	886
Butte	2,164	60.99%	1,384	39.01%	780	21.98%	3,548
Campbell	1,733	80.64%	416	19.36%	1,317	61.28%	2,149
Charles Mix	2,993	47.54%	3,303	52.46%	-310	-4.92%	6,296
Clark	2,622	61.75%	1,624	38.25%	998	23.50%	4,246
Clay	2,463	52.08%	2,266	47.92%	197	4.17%	4,729
Codington	4,320	53.83%	3,705	46.17%	615	7.66%	8,025
Corson	1,709	56.27%	1,328	43.73%	381	12.55%	3,037
Custer	1,796	60.94%	1,151	39.06%	645	21.89%	2,947
Davison	3,659	46.38%	4,230	53.62%	-571	-7.24%	7,889
Day	3,277	49.85%	3,297	50.15%	-20	-0.30%	6,574
Deuel	2,304	66.40%	1,166	33.60%	1,138	32.80%	3,470
Dewey	1,396	56.36%	1,081	43.64%	315	12.72%	2,477
Douglas	1,977	65.53%	1,040	34.47%	937	31.06%	3,017
Edmunds	2,341	61.87%	1,443	38.13%	898	23.73%	3,784
Fall River	2,420	63.27%	1,405	36.73%	1,015	26.54%	3,825
Faulk	1,431	54.41%	1,199	45.59%	232	8.82%	2,630
Grant	2,981	59.38%	2,039	40.62%	942	18.76%	5,020
Gregory	2,478	54.91%	2,035	45.09%	443	9.82%	4,513
Haakon	1,129	61.49%	707	38.51%	422	22.98%	1,836
Hamlin	2,279	64.00%	1,282	36.00%	997	28.00%	3,561
Hand	2,002	55.46%	1,608	44.54%	394	10.91%	3,610
Hanson	1,408	53.66%	1,216	46.34%	192	7.32%	2,624
Harding	755	52.98%	670	47.02%	85	5.96%	1,425
Hughes	1,982	59.27%	1,362	40.73%	620	18.54%	3,344
Hutchinson	5,051	82.08%	1,103	17.92%	3,948	64.15%	6,154
Hyde	1,018	60.31%	670	39.69%	348	20.62%	1,688
Jackson	620	58.77%	435	41.23%	185	17.54%	1,055
Jerauld	1,576	63.17%	919	36.83%	657	26.33%	2,495
Jones	832	62.09%	508	37.91%	324	24.18%	1,340
Kingsbury	3,551	70.26%	1,503	29.74%	2,048	40.52%	5,054
Lake	4,179	68.87%	1,889	31.13%	2,290	37.74%	6,068
Lawrence	5,288	60.07%	3,515	39.93%	1,773	20.14%	8,803
Lincoln	4,081	66.59%	2,048	33.41%	2,033	33.17%	6,129
Lyman	1,409	56.05%	1,105	43.95%	304	12.09%	2,514
Marshall	1,989	50.21%	1,972	49.79%	17	0.43%	3,961
McCook	3,310	66.12%	1,696	33.88%	1,614	32.24%	5,006
McPherson	2,839	77.46%	826	22.54%	2,013	54.92%	3,665
Meade	2,560	57.00%	1,931	43.00%	629	14.01%	4,491
Mellette	990	52.24%	905	47.76%	85	4.49%	1,895
Miner	2,095	60.55%	1,365	39.45%	730	21.10%	3,460
Minnehaha	16,664	57.62%	12,259	42.38%	4,405	15.23%	28,923
Moody	2,749	60.17%	1,820	39.83%	929	20.33%	4,569
Pennington	6,603	57.51%	4,878	42.49%	1,725	15.02%	11,481
Perkins	1,777	57.36%	1,321	42.64%	456	14.72%	3,098
Potter	1,278	54.80%	1,054	45.20%	224	9.61%	2,332
Roberts	3,504	48.30%	3,750	51.70%	-246	-3.39%	7,254
Sanborn	1,732	55.34%	1,398	44.66%	334	10.67%	3,130
Shannon	1,094	58.04%	791	41.96%	303	16.07%	1,885
Spink	2,975	48.70%	3,134	51.30%	-159	-2.60%	6,109
Stanley	679	55.66%	541	44.34%	138	11.31%	1,220
Sully	840	64.71%	458	35.29%	382	29.43%	1,298
Todd	1,245	50.14%	1,238	49.86%	7	0.28%	2,483
Tripp	2,492	54.40%	2,089	45.60%	403	8.80%	4,581
Turner	4,644	72.36%	1,774	27.64%	2,870	44.72%	6,418
Union	3,116	54.44%	2,608	45.56%	508	8.87%	5,724
Walworth	1,921	55.11%	1,565	44.89%	356	10.21%	3,486
Washabaugh	358	48.91%	374	51.09%	-16	-2.19%	732
Washington	335	52.59%	302	47.41%	33	5.18%	637
Yankton	4,179	57.70%	3,064	42.30%	1,115	15.39%	7,243
Ziebach	691	50.15%	687	49.85%	4	0.29%	1,378
Armstrong (Note: No returns were canvassed for Armstrong County and voters from this county were listed in neighbouring counties.)	0	N/A	0	N/A	N/A	N/A	0
Totals	177,065	57.41%	131,362	42.59%	45,703	14.82%	308,427

==== Counties that flipped from Democratic to Republican ====
- Aurora
- Bennett
- Bon Homme
- Buffalo
- Clark
- Clay
- Codington
- Corson
- Custer
- Deuel
- Douglas
- Edmunds
- Fall River
- Faulk
- Grant
- Gregory
- Haakon
- Hand
- Hanson
- Harding
- Hughes
- Jackson
- Jerauld
- Jones
- Lyman
- Marshall
- McCook
- Meade
- Mellette
- Miner
- Minnehaha
- Moody
- Pennington
- Perkins
- Potter
- Sanborn
- Stanley
- Todd
- Tripp
- Union
- Walworth
- Washington
- Yankton
- Ziebach

== See also ==
- United States presidential elections in South Dakota
