= Hilland, South Dakota =

Coordinates: 44°16′58″N 101°51′24″W

Hilland is an extinct town in Haakon County, in the U.S. state of South Dakota. The GNIS classifies it as a populated place.

== History ==
Hilland was laid out in 1908, and named for Hilland Campbell, the son of a first settler. A post office called Hilland was established in 1908, and remained in operation until 1958.
