= 2016 United States presidential election in South Dakota =

- November 8, 2016
- Turnout: 69.61% (of registered voters) ▲0.4 pp 58.11% (of voting age population) ▼0.04 pp

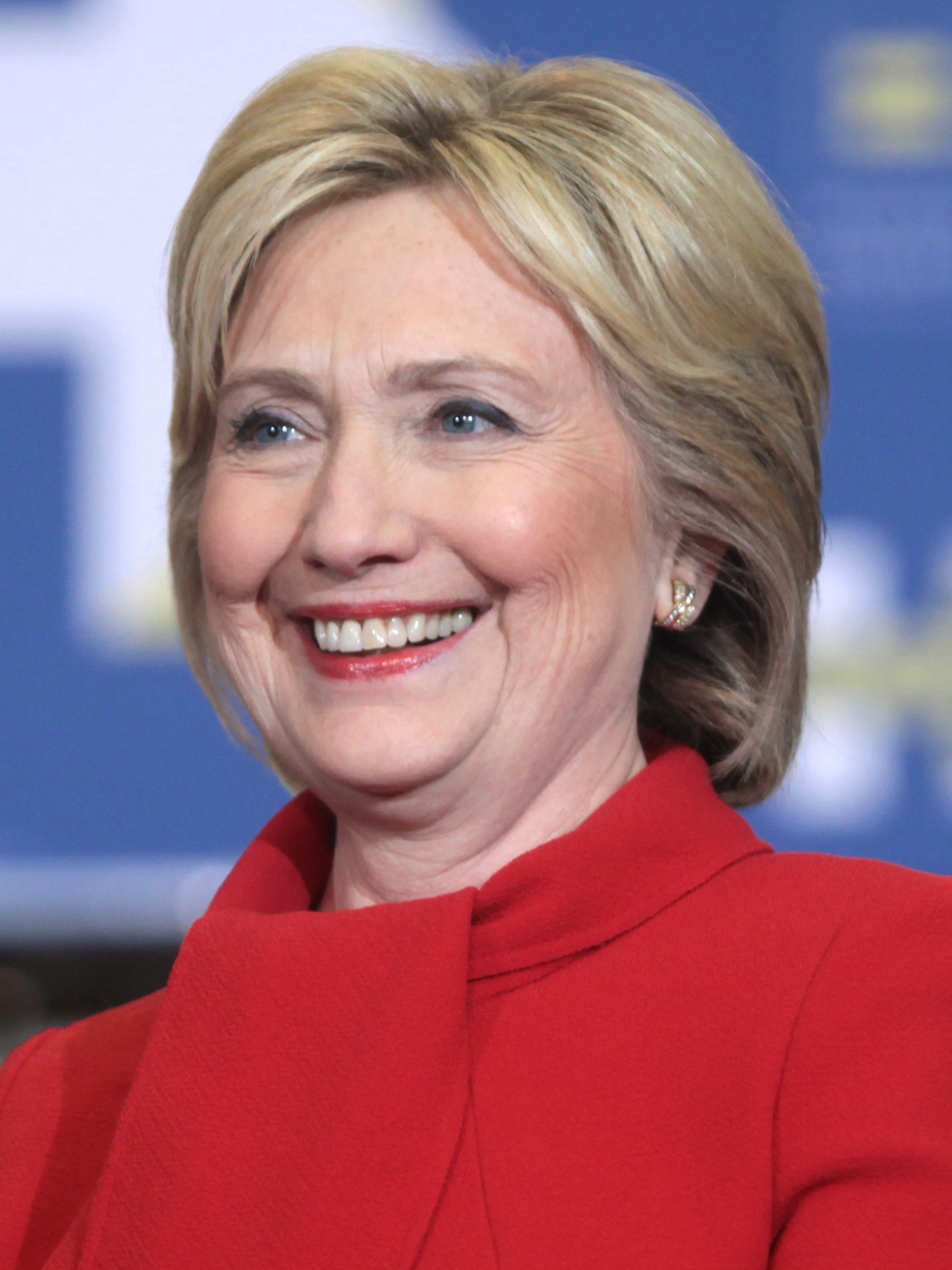

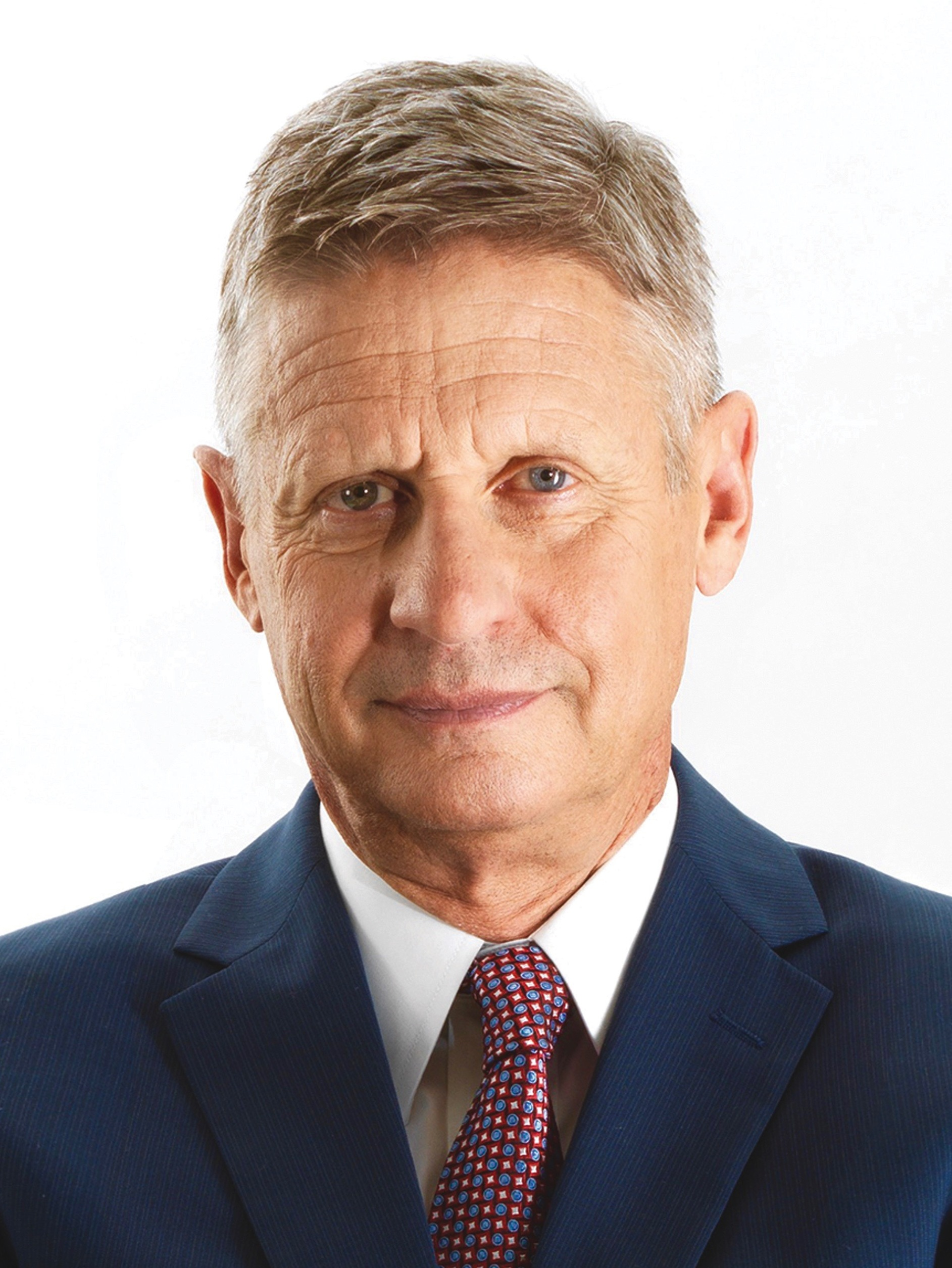
Nominee	Donald Trump	Hillary Clinton	Gary Johnson
Party	Republican	Democratic	Libertarian
Home state	New York	New York	New Mexico
Running mate	Mike Pence	Tim Kaine	Bill Weld
Electoral vote	3	0	0
Popular vote	227,721	117,458	20,850
Percentage	61.53%	31.74%	5.63%

Trump
40–50%
50–60%
60–70%
70–80%
80–90%
90–100%
Clinton
40–50%
50–60%
60–70%
70–80%
80–90%
90–100%
President before election
Barack Obama
Democratic
Elected President
Donald Trump
Republican

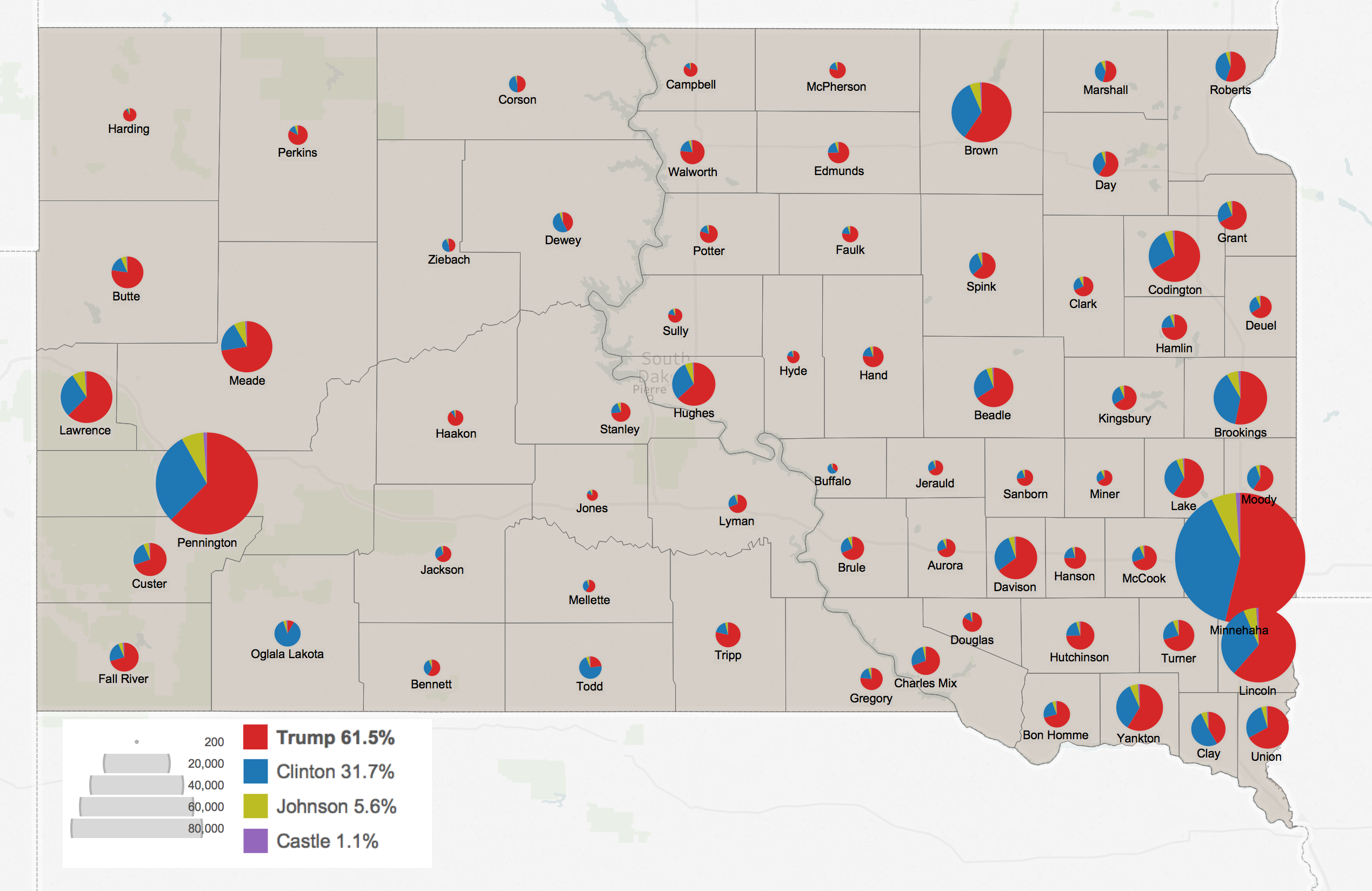
Results by county showing number of votes by size and candidates by color

Treemap of the popular vote by county.

The 2016 United States presidential election in South Dakota was held on November 8, 2016, as part of the 2016 United States presidential election in which all 50 states plus the District of Columbia participated. South Dakota voters chose electors to represent them in the Electoral College via a popular vote pitting the Republican nominee, celebrity Donald Trump, and running mate Indiana Governor Mike Pence against Democratic nominee, former Secretary of State Hillary Clinton and her running mate, Virginia Senator Tim Kaine.

South Dakota has voted for the Republican ticket in every election since 1968. South Dakota was also Libertarian Party candidate Gary Johnson's fifth strongest state in the 2016 election, which his 5.63% in popular vote being only behind New Mexico, North Dakota, Alaska and Oklahoma.

Donald Trump continued the Republican tradition in South Dakota, carrying the state with 61.5% of the vote, to Hillary Clinton's 31.7% of the vote, a 29.8% margin of victory, the largest margin of victory for a candidate of either party since Republican Dwight D. Eisenhower's 38.5% margin in 1952. South Dakota shifted rightward by 12%, one of the larger rightward shifts in 2016. This highlighted the strong rightward shift among white working class voters, particularly in rural areas in Northern states.

== Primary elections ==
=== Democratic primary ===
Two candidates appeared on the Democratic presidential primary ballot:

- Hillary Clinton
- Bernie Sanders

South Dakota Democratic primary, June 7, 2016
Candidate	Popular vote		Estimated delegates		
Candidate	Count	Percentage	Pledged	Unpledged	Total
Hillary Clinton	27,047	51.03%	10	2	12
Bernie Sanders	25,959	48.97%	10	0	10
Uncommitted	—N/a		0	3	3
Total	53,006	100%	20	5	25

=== Republican primary ===
Three candidates appeared on the Republican presidential primary ballot. The only candidate with a campaign that remained active was Donald Trump. Trump's state director was Neal Tapio.

- Ted Cruz (withdrawn)
- John Kasich (withdrawn)
- Donald Trump

Republican primary results by county. Donald Trump

South Dakota Republican primary, June 7, 2016
Candidate	Votes	Percentage	Actual delegate count		
Candidate	Votes	Percentage	Bound	Unbound	Total
Donald Trump	44,867	67.09%	29	0	29
Ted Cruz (withdrawn)	11,352	16.97%	0	0	0
John Kasich (withdrawn)	10,660	15.94%	0	0	0
Unprojected delegates:			0	0	0
Total:	66,879	100.00%	29	0	29
Source: The Green Papers

== General election ==
=== Predictions ===
The following are final 2016 predictions from various organizations for South Dakota as of Election Day.

Source	Ranking	As of
Los Angeles Times	Safe R	November 6, 2016
CNN	Safe R	November 8, 2016
Rothenberg Political Report	Safe R	November 7, 2016
Sabato's Crystal Ball	Safe R	November 7, 2016
NBC	Likely R	November 7, 2016
RealClearPolitics	Likely R	November 8, 2016
Fox News	Safe R	November 7, 2016
ABC	Safe R	November 7, 2016

=== Results ===
Chart of popular vote
1. Trump (61.5%)
2. Clinton (31.7%)
3. Johnson (5.63%)
4. Castle (1.10%)

2016 United States presidential election in South Dakota
Party	Candidate	Running Mate	Votes	Percentage	Electoral votes
Republican	Donald Trump	Mike Pence	227,721	61.53%	3
Democratic	Hillary Clinton	Tim Kaine	117,458	31.74%	0
Libertarian	Gary Johnson	Bill Weld	20,850	5.63%	0
Constitution	Darrell L. Castle	Scott N. Bradley	4,064	1.10%	0
Totals			370,093	100.00%	3

==== By county ====
County	Donald Trump Republican		Hillary Clinton Democratic		Various candidates Other parties		Margin		Total
County	#	%	#	%	#	%	#	%	Total
Aurora	974	69.23%	340	24.16%	93	6.61%	634	45.06%	1,407
Beadle	4,455	65.79%	1,912	28.23%	405	5.98%	2,543	37.55%	6,772
Bennett	666	57.96%	412	35.86%	71	6.18%	254	22.11%	1,149
Bon Homme	2,105	70.78%	704	23.67%	165	5.55%	1,401	47.11%	2,974
Brookings	6,748	53.22%	4,879	38.48%	1,053	8.30%	1,869	14.74%	12,680
Brown	9,613	59.66%	5,452	33.83%	1,049	6.51%	4,161	25.82%	16,114
Brule	1,565	68.40%	571	24.96%	152	6.64%	994	43.44%	2,288
Buffalo	171	34.90%	296	60.41%	23	4.69%	-125	-25.51%	490
Butte	3,357	77.15%	696	16.00%	298	6.85%	2,661	61.16%	4,351
Campbell	704	84.72%	105	12.64%	22	2.65%	599	72.08%	831
Charles Mix	2,382	69.39%	935	27.24%	116	3.38%	1,447	42.15%	3,433
Clark	1,139	68.74%	398	24.02%	120	7.24%	741	44.72%	1,657
Clay	2,109	41.61%	2,608	51.45%	352	6.94%	-499	-9.84%	5,069
Codington	7,764	66.54%	3,174	27.20%	731	6.26%	4,590	39.33%	11,669
Corson	588	50.04%	535	45.53%	52	4.43%	53	4.51%	1,175
Custer	3,293	69.75%	1,121	23.74%	307	6.50%	2,172	46.01%	4,721
Davison	5,157	64.85%	2,355	29.62%	440	5.53%	2,802	35.24%	7,952
Day	1,627	59.23%	974	35.46%	146	5.31%	653	23.77%	2,747
Deuel	1,366	65.67%	570	27.40%	144	6.92%	796	38.27%	2,080
Dewey	723	42.33%	888	51.99%	97	5.68%	-165	-9.66%	1,708
Douglas	1,338	83.36%	214	13.33%	53	3.30%	1,124	70.03%	1,605
Edmunds	1,433	74.71%	380	19.81%	105	5.47%	1,053	54.90%	1,918
Fall River	2,511	70.47%	821	23.04%	231	6.48%	1,690	47.43%	3,563
Faulk	858	76.74%	204	18.25%	56	5.01%	654	58.50%	1,118
Grant	2,382	66.84%	971	27.24%	211	5.92%	1,411	39.59%	3,564
Gregory	1,600	76.52%	391	18.70%	100	4.78%	1,209	57.82%	2,091
Haakon	936	89.66%	77	7.38%	31	2.97%	859	82.28%	1,044
Hamlin	2,051	74.26%	555	20.09%	156	5.65%	1,496	54.16%	2,762
Hand	1,391	76.51%	334	18.37%	93	5.12%	1,057	58.14%	1,818
Hanson	1,497	74.63%	424	21.14%	85	4.24%	1,073	53.49%	2,006
Harding	695	90.26%	38	4.94%	37	4.81%	657	85.32%	770
Hughes	5,174	63.29%	2,450	29.97%	551	6.74%	2,724	33.32%	8,175
Hutchinson	2,517	74.80%	692	20.56%	156	4.64%	1,825	54.23%	3,365
Hyde	543	78.70%	125	18.12%	22	3.19%	418	60.58%	690
Jackson	722	65.94%	323	29.50%	50	4.57%	399	36.44%	1,095
Jerauld	648	67.01%	264	27.30%	55	5.69%	384	39.71%	967
Jones	450	80.65%	69	12.37%	39	6.99%	381	68.28%	558
Kingsbury	1,680	65.86%	703	27.56%	168	6.59%	977	38.30%	2,551
Lake	4,038	59.50%	2,314	34.10%	434	6.40%	1,724	25.41%	6,786
Lawrence	7,411	62.58%	3,356	28.34%	1,075	9.08%	4,055	34.24%	11,842
Lincoln	15,499	61.43%	8,076	32.01%	1,656	6.56%	7,423	29.42%	25,231
Lyman	977	68.75%	369	25.97%	75	5.28%	608	42.79%	1,421
Marshall	1,056	54.24%	754	38.73%	137	7.04%	302	15.51%	1,947
McCook	1,794	69.35%	623	24.08%	170	6.57%	1,171	45.26%	2,587
McPherson	892	78.45%	192	16.89%	53	4.66%	700	61.57%	1,137
Meade	8,441	72.64%	2,223	19.13%	957	8.24%	6,218	53.51%	11,621
Mellette	402	58.86%	238	34.85%	43	6.30%	164	24.01%	683
Miner	706	66.35%	281	26.41%	77	7.24%	425	39.94%	1,064
Minnehaha	42,043	53.72%	30,610	39.11%	5,610	7.17%	11,433	14.61%	78,263
Moody	1,731	59.02%	1,043	35.56%	159	5.42%	688	23.46%	2,933
Oglala Lakota	241	8.30%	2,510	86.40%	154	5.30%	-2,269	-78.11%	2,905
Pennington	29,804	62.43%	14,074	29.48%	3,865	8.10%	15,730	32.95%	47,743
Perkins	1,333	83.00%	188	11.71%	85	5.29%	1,145	71.30%	1,606
Potter	1,071	80.10%	215	16.08%	51	3.81%	856	64.02%	1,337
Roberts	2,144	55.13%	1,540	39.60%	205	5.27%	604	15.53%	3,889
Sanborn	819	72.93%	241	21.46%	63	5.61%	578	51.47%	1,123
Spink	1,854	62.83%	919	31.14%	178	6.03%	935	31.68%	2,951
Stanley	1,148	73.26%	329	21.00%	90	5.74%	819	52.27%	1,567
Sully	679	78.86%	137	15.91%	45	5.23%	542	62.95%	861
Todd	487	22.92%	1,505	70.82%	133	6.26%	-1,018	-47.91%	2,125
Tripp	2,069	78.67%	462	17.57%	99	3.76%	1,607	61.10%	2,630
Turner	2,937	70.77%	961	23.16%	252	6.07%	1,976	47.61%	4,150
Union	5,290	66.99%	2,227	28.20%	380	4.81%	3,063	38.79%	7,897
Walworth	1,896	76.54%	457	18.45%	124	5.01%	1,439	58.09%	2,477
Yankton	5,659	58.81%	3,301	34.30%	663	6.89%	2,358	24.50%	9,623
Ziebach	368	47.98%	353	46.02%	46	6.00%	15	1.96%	767
Totals	227,721	61.53%	117,458	31.74%	24,914	6.73%	110,263	29.79%	370,093

Counties that flipped from Democratic to Republican

- Day (largest town: Webster)
- Corson (largest city: McLaughlin)
- Marshall (largest city: Britton)
- Roberts (largest city: Sisseston)
- Ziebach (largest city: Dupree)

==== By congressional district ====
South Dakota has only one congressional district because of its small population compared to other states. This district, called the at-large district because it covers the entire state, is equivalent to the statewide election results.

District	Trump	Clinton	Representative
At-large	61.53%	31.74%	Kristi Noem

== Analysis ==
South Dakota gave Republican nominee Donald Trump a more than 29-point margin of victory over Democratic rival Hillary Clinton, thus gaining him three electoral votes. The Mount Rushmore state's politics are driven by agrarian conservatism, with the eastern portion of the state being largely rural and considered an extension of the Corn Belt. The western portion of the state is even more conservative. South Dakota, like many neighboring majority-white Great Plains and prairie states in the Farm Belt, has not voted for a Democratic candidate since the landslide election of Lyndon B. Johnson in 1964.

Donald Trump carried most of the state's counties, including Hughes County where the capital city of Pierre is located, Pennington County which contains Rapid City, Minnehaha County which contains Sioux Falls, Brown County which contains Aberdeen, and Codington County which contains Watertown. Clinton won only five counties statewide: Todd, Buffalo, Dewey, and Oglala Lakota, all of which are majority Native American, and Clay County which contains the University of South Dakota. However, Trump did fare well with some Native American groups, and thus held the Native American-majority counties of Bennett, Corson, Mellette and Ziebach, along with the plurality-Native county of Jackson. Distinctly noticeable were the split of both the Pine Ridge and Standing Rock reservations votes and the majority-Native counties they contained: the western half of Pine Ridge (Oglala Lakota County) voted Democrat, while eastern Pine Ridge (Bennett and Jackson Counties) voted Republican, and while northern Standing Rock (Sioux County) remained heavily Democratic, southern Standing Rock (Corson County) swung Republican for the first time in three elections.

== See also ==
- First presidency of Donald Trump
- United States presidential elections in South Dakota
- 2016 Democratic Party presidential debates and forums
- 2016 Democratic Party presidential primaries
- 2016 Republican Party presidential debates and forums
- 2016 Republican Party presidential primaries
