= Bridger, South Dakota =

- Census-designated place
- Location within South Dakota Location within the United States
- Coordinates: 44°32′32″N 101°54′49″W
- Country: United States
- State: South Dakota
- County: Ziebach

Area
  - Total: 0.27 sq mi (0.69 km^{2})
  - Land: 0.27 sq mi (0.69 km^{2})
  - Water: 0 sq mi (0.00 km^{2})
- Elevation: 1,870 ft (570 m)

Population (2020)
  - Total: 48
  - Density: 181.4/sq mi (70.04/km^{2})
- Time zone: UTC-7 (Mountain (MST))
  - Summer (DST): UTC-6 (MDT)
- ZIP Code: 57748 (Howes)
- Area code: 605
- FIPS code: 46-07140
- GNIS feature ID: 2813068

Bridger is an unincorporated community and census-designated place (CDP) in Ziebach County, South Dakota, United States, within the Cheyenne River Indian Reservation. The population was 48 at the 2020 census. It was first listed as a CDP prior to the 2020 census.

It is in the southwest corner of the county, 1 mile (1.6 km) north of the Cheyenne River, which forms the border with Haakon County to the south. Bridger is also 1 mile (1.6 km) east of South Dakota Highway 34, which leads 87 miles (140 km) west to Sturgis and east 86 miles (138 km) to Pierre.

== Demographics ==
Historical population
Census	Pop.	Note	%±
2020	48		—
U.S. Decennial Census

== Education ==
The CDP is served by Dupree School District 64-2.
