= Kirley, South Dakota =

Unincorporated community in South Dakota, U.S.

Coordinates: 44°31′25″N 101°18′43″W

Kirley is an unincorporated community in Haakon County, in the U.S. state of South Dakota.

== History ==
A post office called Kirley was established in 1908, and remained in operation until 1973. The community has the name of a pioneer settler.
