= Armstrong County, South Dakota =

County in South Dakota, United States, 1883–1952

- 1883–1952
- Armstrong County (red) and Stanley County (pink)
- Area
  - Coordinates: 44.75°N 101.0°W
  - 1950: 1,359.744 km^{2} (525.000 sq mi)
- Population
  - 1950: 52
- Status: Unorganized county in South Dakota
- Government
  - Type: Attached to Stanley County with appointed officers
- History
  - Established: 8 March 1883
  - Disestablished: 1952
Preceded by
| Cheyenne County |
| Rusk County |
| Stanley County |
Succeeded by
| Dewey County |
- Today part of: Dewey County

Armstrong County was a county in the U.S. state of South Dakota, and its predecessor Dakota Territory, between 1883 and 1952. Located in the western part of the state, it was a sparsely-inhabited part of the Cheyenne River Indian Reservation that relied primarily on the cattle trade and the Missouri and Cheyenne Rivers. Never having an organized county government in its own right, it was attached to Stanley County, with its county seat at Fort Pierre, for administrative purposes.

An unrelated "Armstrong County" had existed in the eastern part of the Dakota Territory between 1873 and 1879. Pyatt County was established in 1883 in the western part of the territory near the Missouri River, and was renamed Armstrong County in 1895. Having lost a significant part of its territory to Stanley and Ziebach Counties between 1898 and 1911, its subsequent population was so low that it set several records: it was often the only county in the nation to cast the entirety of its votes for one presidential candidate, by 1940 it was the only county without a post office, and by 1950 it was the only county without a single employee of the federal government.

The construction of the Oahe Dam flooded out most of the valuable land in the county. Dewey County, which had refused to annex the county in the past, finally did so in 1952. The site of Armstrong County is now home to several more homesites than it had when it was a county.

== History ==
=== Original Armstrong County (1873–1879) ===
An Armstrong County was created by the Dakota Territorial Legislature in 1873 in the southeastern part of the territory, taking its territory from Charles Mix County and Hutchinson County. The county was short lived and never fully organized. In 1879 it was annexed into Hutchinson County.

=== Pyatt County (1883–1895) ===
In 1883 Dakota Territory created a new county west of the Missouri River and named it Pyatt County. The county was formed from unorganized lands and parts of Cheyenne, Dewey (then named Rusk) and Stanley Counties.

=== Armstrong County, losses (1895–1911) ===
In 1895, the county was renamed Armstrong in honor of Moses K. Armstrong, a pioneer in the territory who lobbied for territorial organization and later served in the Territorial Legislature and as a territorial delegate to the United States House of Representatives. The county originally covered much of the southern part of what is now the Cheyenne River Indian Reservation. In 1898, part of the county was annexed to Stanley County to the south. The western portion was lost when Ziebach County was created in 1911.

=== Subsequent years (1911–1952) ===
In World War II parts of the county were used for aerial gunnery practice. During that conflict the county lost one citizen who was killed in action.

In 1952, given its small population and with much of the best land flooded by the Oahe Dam, the county was abolished and annexed into the southern part of Dewey County. In addition, tax collectors alleged that cattle owners were moving their herds into the county in order to pay lower levies.

Dewey County continues to maintain an "Armstrong County Road" as of 2022.

== Geography ==
Armstrong County was 525 square miles (1,360 km^{2}) in area. As of 1978, the land that had been Armstrong County was part of the Sansarc-Opal association, except for the extreme northwest corner that was part of the Wayden-Cabba association.

== Politics and government ==
United States presidential election results for Armstrong County, South Dakota
| Year | Republican | | Democratic | | Third party(ies) | |
| Year | No. | % | No. | % | No. | % |
|---|---|---|---|---|---|---|
| 1928 | 0 | 0.00% | 7 | 100.00% | 0 | 0.00% |
| 1932 | 0 | 0.00% | 17 | 100.00% | 0 | 0.00% |
| 1944 | 0 | 0.00% | 4 | 100.00% | 0 | 0.00% |
| 1948 | 1 | 14.29% | 6 | 85.71% | 0 | 0.00% |
| 1952 | 6 | 54.55% | 5 | 45.45% | 0 | 0.00% |

The county was never formally organized, and was attached to Stanley County for governmental purposes. County residents were unable to vote for Stanley County officers, only state and federal positions. This created a situation of "taxation without representation", which caused a scandal in the early 1950s. The house of resident Ethan Alexander was selected as the polling place, but not enough voters were present in the county to ever have a proper board of elections. Alexander himself served as the county's assessor for years. Like its neighbors, but unlike many other counties in South Dakota, Armstrong County was not divided into townships.

In the 1928 presidential election, the county cast all seven of its votes for Democratic candidate Al Smith, the only county in the country to cast the entirety of its votes to a single candidate. For 1932 through 1940, no returns were listed for Armstrong County in particular, and its voters were instead recorded in neighboring counties. Armstrong County returned to election statistics in 1944, where it once again had a unanimous return, for Democratic candidate Franklin D. Roosevelt with all four votes. Harry S. Truman, the Democratic nominee for 1948, won the county but fell short of unanimity by one vote, which went to Republican Thomas Dewey instead. The county swung to the Republicans for its final presidential election in 1952, when Dwight Eisenhower narrowly defeated Adlai Stevenson II six votes to five.

In 1940, Armstrong County was the only county in the nation without a post office.

== Demographics and economy ==
Historical population
| Census | Pop. | Note | %± |
|---|---|---|---|
| 1900 | 8 | | — |
| 1910 | 647 | | 7,987.5% |
| 1930 | 80 | | — |
| 1940 | 42 | | −47.5% |
| 1950 | 52 | | 23.8% |

After the 1911 incorporation of Ziebach and Dewey Counties, Armstrong County had 52 people living in 8 families. The majority of county residents lived on the banks of the Missouri and Cheyenne Rivers, which provided grass and timber for the local cattle economy and whose river bottoms provided shelter.

Most of the county's land was leased to cattle companies such as Diamond A. The resident Norvold family owned land both in the county and in Ziebach County.

The county had no schools. The Norvold children in particular were educated in various places such as Cheyenne Agency, Eagle Butte, and other adjacent counties. There were no roads in the county, nor telephones nor electric lights.

In 1950, Armstrong had the distinction of being the only county in the United States without a single civilian federal employee. Spiritual Mobilization, a group opposed to government spending, wrote a song about it:

All Hail to Armstrong, South Dakota,
Land of the Free
You have yet to fill your quota
With a Federal Employee!

No one from Agriculture?
How do you farm?
No one from Justice?
Who keeps you from harm?

No one from Veterans?
By whom are you paid?
No one from Commerce?
How do you trade?

No one from Housing?
Who buildeth your shacks?
No one from Treasury?
Who takes your tax?

No one from Post Office?
Who sells your stamp supply?
No one from Military?
Who keeps your powder dry?

And no one from Security?
How, then, can you be social?
If you have no single bureaucrat
To decide things equivocal?

Even the Department of the Interior
Is from Armstrong’s roster missed.
Tell me, Armstrong County,
How do you exist?

All Hail to Armstrong County,
Where there’s no 'share the pelf,'
And despite the Welfare Staters,
Each does things for himself!

Following the demise of Armstrong County, a second song by Peter Steele was written to the tune of Battle Hymn of the Republic:

They have conquered Armstrong County - they are jubilant today!
In the name of tax evasion they have voted it away.
The citadel of freedom has been levelled in the fray.
And "progress" marches on!

"Progress," "progress," we salute you!
No one living shall refute you!
Lack of dollars shan't dilute you!
We'll help you on your way!

The victors in the tussle were the tax collection men,
Tried and trusted commissaries of the welfare regimen,
They fought to get the shekels out of every citizen
To finance "progress" on!

"Progress," "progress,"...

So they trampled Armstrong's freedom and its democratic stand,
Got the folks of Dewey County to absorb Sudetenland.
No hope on Armstrong's ramparts - "Lebensraum!" was the demand
Of "progress" marching on!

"Progress," "progress,"...

Now they've cleansed the Armstrong stigma from the South Dakota plains.
On the wallmaps of the bureaucrats no tiny speck remains
To indicate a single spot where independence reigns
As "progress" marches on!

"Progress," "progress,"...

Today in Armstrong's borders watch the cattle bend a knee
To a brand new herd of bi-peds which has joined the coterie.
Their genus name is Federal: their species - Employee.
And "progress" marches on!

"Progress," "progress,"...

The moral of this story it is tragic to relate
Is that freedom made it possible to have the Welfare State.
Trade freedom for security and we degenerate.
True progress will be gone!

"Progress," "progress," we remind you!
Is a slogan which can blind you!
Instead of serving it can bind you!
Make liberty its prey!

== Works cited ==
- United States Department of Agriculture Soil Conservation Service; Bureau of Indian Affairs; South Dakota Agricultural Experiment Station (1978). Soil Survey of Dewey County, South Dakota. Washington – via Internet Archive.
