= 1944 United States presidential election in South Dakota =

- November 7, 1944

All 4 South Dakota votes to the Electoral College

Nominee	Thomas E. Dewey	Franklin D. Roosevelt
Party	Republican	Democratic
Home state	New York	New York
Running mate	John W. Bricker	Harry S. Truman
Electoral vote	4	0
Popular vote	135,365	96,711
Percentage	58.33%	41.67%
County results
Dewey
50–60%
60–70%
70–80%
80–90%
Roosevelt
50–60%
90–100%
President before election
Franklin D. Roosevelt
Democratic
Elected President
Franklin D. Roosevelt
Democratic

The 1944 United States presidential election in South Dakota took place on November 7, 1944, as part of the 1944 United States presidential election. Voters chose four representatives, or electors, to the Electoral College, who voted for president and vice president.

South Dakota was won by Governor Thomas E. Dewey (R–New York), running with Governor John Bricker, with 58.33% of the popular vote, against incumbent President Franklin D. Roosevelt (D–New York), running with Senator Harry S. Truman, with 41.67% of the popular vote.

With 58.33% of the popular vote, South Dakota would prove to be Dewey's third strongest state after Kansas and Nebraska.

== Results ==
1944 United States presidential election in South Dakota
Party	Candidate	Votes	%
Republican	Thomas E. Dewey	135,365	58.33%
Democratic	Franklin D. Roosevelt (inc.)	96,711	41.67%
Total votes		232,076	100%

=== Results by county ===
County	Thomas Edmund Dewey Republican		Franklin Delano Roosevelt Democratic		Margin		Total votes cast
County	#	%	#	%	#	%	Total votes cast
Armstrong	0	0.00%	4	100.00%	-4	-100.00%	4
Aurora	1,163	53.50%	1,011	46.50%	152	6.99%	2,174
Beadle	3,610	48.44%	3,842	51.56%	-232	-3.11%	7,452
Bennett	494	46.60%	566	53.40%	-72	-6.79%	1,060
Bon Homme	2,553	56.31%	1,981	43.69%	572	12.62%	4,534
Brookings	4,136	66.61%	2,073	33.39%	2,063	33.23%	6,209
Brown	5,611	46.90%	6,352	53.10%	-741	-6.19%	11,963
Brule	1,002	41.51%	1,412	58.49%	-410	-16.98%	2,414
Buffalo	324	56.45%	250	43.55%	74	12.89%	574
Butte	1,824	66.28%	928	33.72%	896	32.56%	2,752
Campbell	1,047	83.43%	208	16.57%	839	66.85%	1,255
Charles Mix	2,171	44.56%	2,701	55.44%	-530	-10.88%	4,872
Clark	1,936	61.56%	1,209	38.44%	727	23.12%	3,145
Clay	1,970	52.31%	1,796	47.69%	174	4.62%	3,766
Codington	3,348	51.76%	3,120	48.24%	228	3.53%	6,468
Corson	1,008	56.19%	786	43.81%	222	12.37%	1,794
Custer	1,288	64.40%	712	35.60%	576	28.80%	2,000
Davison	2,929	47.62%	3,222	52.38%	-293	-4.76%	6,151
Day	2,593	51.04%	2,487	48.96%	106	2.09%	5,080
Deuel	1,910	61.81%	1,180	38.19%	730	23.62%	3,090
Dewey	913	64.12%	511	35.88%	402	28.23%	1,424
Douglas	1,483	67.35%	719	32.65%	764	34.70%	2,202
Edmunds	1,762	64.71%	961	35.29%	801	29.42%	2,723
Fall River	1,938	63.33%	1,122	36.67%	816	26.67%	3,060
Faulk	1,090	54.88%	896	45.12%	194	9.77%	1,986
Grant	2,278	60.70%	1,475	39.30%	803	21.40%	3,753
Gregory	2,067	56.17%	1,613	43.83%	454	12.34%	3,680
Haakon	638	62.61%	381	37.39%	257	25.22%	1,019
Hamlin	1,811	63.97%	1,020	36.03%	791	27.94%	2,831
Hand	1,558	57.62%	1,146	42.38%	412	15.24%	2,704
Hanson	1,070	55.33%	864	44.67%	206	10.65%	1,934
Harding	552	52.82%	493	47.18%	59	5.65%	1,045
Hughes	1,676	64.12%	938	35.88%	738	28.23%	2,614
Hutchinson	3,799	84.46%	699	15.54%	3,100	68.92%	4,498
Hyde	842	64.97%	454	35.03%	388	29.94%	1,296
Jackson	340	61.48%	213	38.52%	127	22.97%	553
Jerauld	1,217	62.47%	731	37.53%	486	24.95%	1,948
Jones	465	63.79%	264	36.21%	201	27.57%	729
Kingsbury	2,541	68.73%	1,156	31.27%	1,385	37.46%	3,697
Lake	2,956	65.70%	1,543	34.30%	1,413	31.41%	4,499
Lawrence	3,528	65.41%	1,866	34.59%	1,662	30.81%	5,394
Lincoln	3,298	66.99%	1,625	33.01%	1,673	33.98%	4,923
Lyman	867	57.92%	630	42.08%	237	15.83%	1,497
Marshall	1,511	52.57%	1,363	47.43%	148	5.15%	2,874
McCook	2,516	68.39%	1,163	31.61%	1,353	36.78%	3,679
McPherson	2,290	84.81%	410	15.19%	1,880	69.63%	2,700
Meade	1,912	62.16%	1,164	37.84%	748	24.32%	3,076
Mellette	544	57.02%	410	42.98%	134	14.05%	954
Miner	1,544	58.62%	1,090	41.38%	454	17.24%	2,634
Minnehaha	13,920	57.67%	10,216	42.33%	3,704	15.35%	24,136
Moody	2,080	59.43%	1,420	40.57%	660	18.86%	3,500
Pennington	5,246	59.87%	3,517	40.13%	1,729	19.73%	8,763
Perkins	1,325	57.11%	995	42.89%	330	14.22%	2,320
Potter	1,001	58.27%	717	41.73%	284	16.53%	1,718
Roberts	2,721	47.36%	3,024	52.64%	-303	-5.27%	5,745
Sanborn	1,212	54.84%	998	45.16%	214	9.68%	2,210
Shannon	562	53.93%	480	46.07%	82	7.87%	1,042
Spink	2,365	50.86%	2,285	49.14%	80	1.72%	4,650
Stanley	384	62.14%	234	37.86%	150	24.27%	618
Sully	612	67.11%	300	32.89%	312	34.21%	912
Todd	737	51.90%	683	48.10%	54	3.80%	1,420
Tripp	1,911	53.82%	1,640	46.18%	271	7.63%	3,551
Turner	3,549	73.13%	1,304	26.87%	2,245	46.26%	4,853
Union	2,501	54.87%	2,057	45.13%	444	9.74%	4,558
Walworth	1,533	55.64%	1,222	44.36%	311	11.29%	2,755
Washabaugh	139	48.77%	146	51.23%	-7	-2.46%	285
Yankton	3,313	58.41%	2,359	41.59%	954	16.82%	5,672
Ziebach	331	48.32%	354	51.68%	-23	-3.36%	685
Totals	135,365	58.33%	96,711	41.67%	38,654	16.66%	232,076

==== Counties that flipped from Republican to Democratic ====
- Bennett
- Ziebach

==== Counties that flipped from Democratic to Republican ====
- Day
- Spink

== See also ==
- United States presidential elections in South Dakota
