= Milesville, South Dakota =

- Unincorporated community
- Location within South Dakota Location within the United States
- Coordinates: 44°27′29″N 101°40′46″W
- Country: United States
- State: South Dakota
- County: Haakon
- Elevation: 2,356 ft (718 m)
- Time zone: UTC-6 (Mountain (MST))
  - Summer (DST): UTC-5 (MDT)
- ZIP codes: 57553
- GNIS feature ID: 1256463

Milesville is an unincorporated community in Haakon County, South Dakota, United States. Population and other demographics are not reported by the Census Bureau. The village consists of one church, a veterinary clinic, and a volunteer fire department.

Milesville was laid out in 1905 by one Mr. Miles, and named for him.
