= Ziebach County, South Dakota =

County in South Dakota, United States

- County
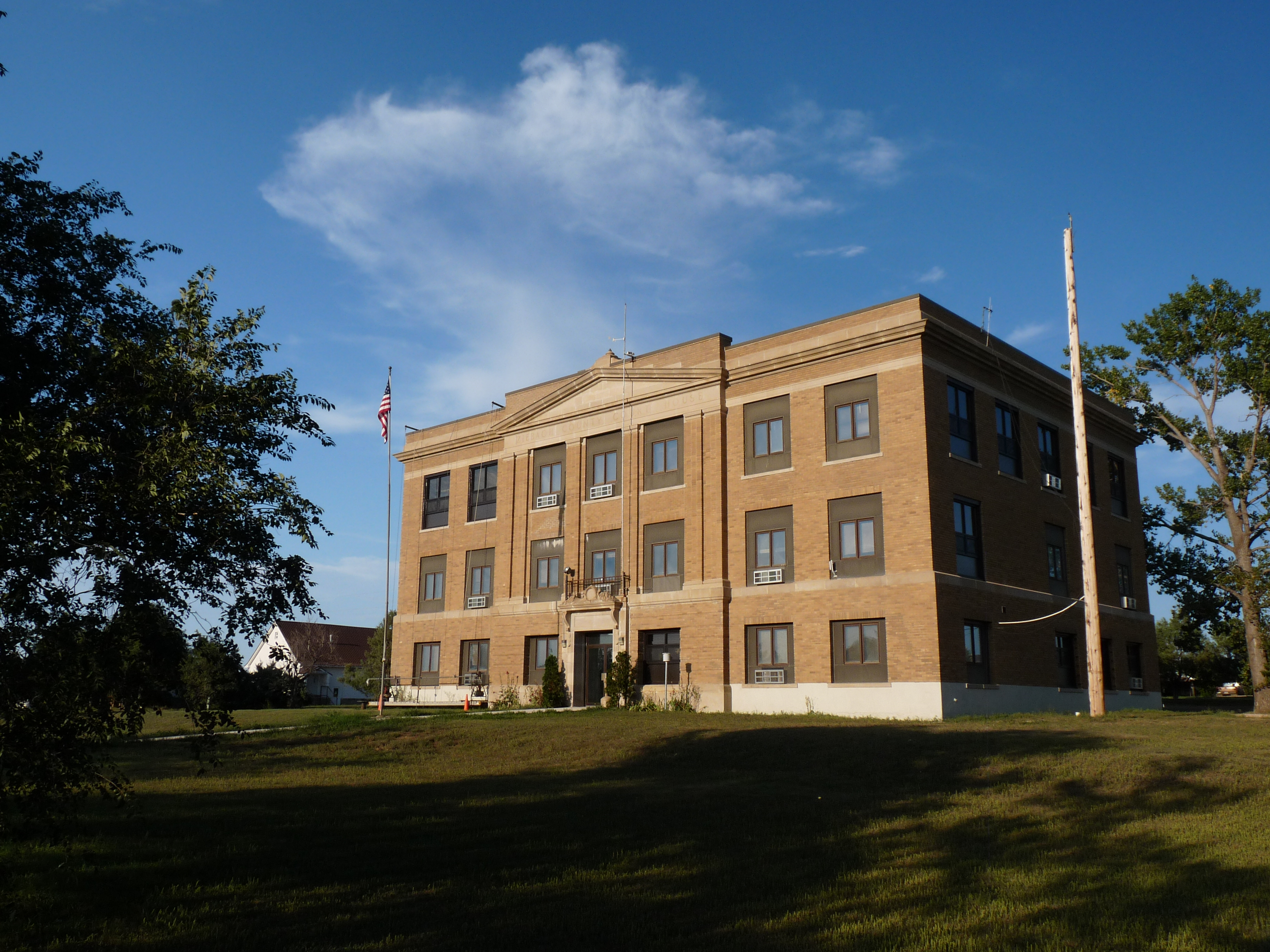
- Ziebach County Courthouse

- Location within the U.S. state of South Dakota
- Coordinates: 44°59′N 101°40′W
- Country: United States
- State: South Dakota
- Founded: 1911
- Named for: Frank M. Ziebach
- Seat: Dupree
- Largest city: Dupree

Area
  - Total: 1,971 sq mi (5,100 km^{2})
  - Land: 1,961 sq mi (5,080 km^{2})
  - Water: 9.3 sq mi (24 km^{2}) 0.5%

Population (2020)
  - Total: 2,413
  - Estimate (2025): 2,389 ▼
  - Density: 1.230/sq mi (0.4751/km^{2})
- Time zone: UTC−7 (Mountain)
  - Summer (DST): UTC−6 (MDT)
- Congressional district: At-large
- Website: ziebachcounty.org

Ziebach County (/ˈziːbɑːk/ ZEE-bahk) is a county in the U.S. state of South Dakota. As of the 2020 census, the population was 2,413. Its county seat is Dupree. It is the last county (or county equivalent) in the United States alphabetically.

Ziebach County consists entirely of Indian reservations. Most of the county is within the Cheyenne River Indian Reservation and the remainder is within the Standing Rock Sioux Reservation.

== History ==
A county named Ziebach was created in Dakota Territory in 1877. However, after South Dakota became a state, this county was dissolved in 1898 and its areas absorbed by Pennington and Stanley counties. The present Ziebach County was created by the South Dakota Legislature on February 1, 1911, and was fully organized by April 22. The 1911 Ziebach County encompassed parts of the former counties of Schnasse, Armstrong and Sterling, which were the last three extinct counties of South Dakota to cease to exist. It was named for Frank M. Ziebach, a political figure in the Dakota Territory during the territorial period from 1861 to 1889. Previously the area had been used by trappers and in 1907 part was briefly a reservation for Ute Indians displaced from Utah and Wyoming. Early in the 20th Century cattle were raised in substantial numbers, but when the railroad bypassed the area this industry declined. Limited homesteading also occurred on the more fertile lands.

== Geography ==
The Cheyenne River flows east-northeastward along the southern boundary of Ziebach County. The Moreau River flows eastward through the upper portion of the county, and Cherry Creek flows southeastward through the lower portion, draining the area into the Cheyenne River. The terrain is composed of semi-arid rolling hills interrupted by buttes and carved by drainages and gullies, partly devoted to agriculture and cattle. The terrain slopes to the south and the east; its highest point (except for the isolated Thunder Butte, at 2,733 feet or 833 meters) is near its northwest corner at 2,582 ft (787 m) ASL. The county has a total area of 1,971 square miles (5,100 km^{2}), of which 1,961 square miles (5,080 km^{2}) is land and 9.3 square miles (24 km^{2}) (0.5%) is water. Almost the entire county lies within the Cheyenne River Indian Reservation. The balance of the county, along its extreme northern county line, lies within the Standing Rock Sioux Reservation. It is one of five South Dakota counties that are composed entirely of land that is within the boundaries of Indian reservations.

=== Buttes ===
Ziebach County is part of the Great Plains and is characterized by rolling grasslands and numerous buttes. The buttes form the highest points of elevation in Ziebach County:

- Bessie Butte 2,474 feet (754 m)
- Eagle Butte 2,484 feet (757 m)
- Gray Butte 2,316 feet (706 m)
- High Elk Hill 2,395 feet (730 m)
- Joshua Butte 2,165 feet (660 m)
- Marple Butte 2,484 feet (757 m)
- Mud Butte 2,500 feet (760 m)
- Mud Butte 2,365 feet (721 m)
- Rattlesnake Butte 2,411 feet (735 m)
- Saint Patrick Butte 2,356 feet (718 m)
- Squaw Teat Butte 2,365 feet (721 m)
- Thunder Butte 2,733 feet (833 m)

=== Major highways ===
- U.S. Highway 212
- South Dakota Highway 20
- South Dakota Highway 34
- South Dakota Highway 63
- South Dakota Highway 65
- South Dakota Highway 73

=== Adjacent counties ===
- Corson County – north
- Dewey County – east
- Stanley County – southeast
- Haakon County – south
- Pennington County – southwest
- Meade County – west
- Perkins County – northwest

=== Protected areas ===
- Bednor Lake State Game Production Area
- Cheyenne State Game Production Area (part)
- Grand River National Grassland (part)

=== Lakes and reservoirs ===
- Bedners Dam
- Lake Buffalo
- K C Dam
- Rattlesnake Lake

== Demographics ==
Historical population
Census	Pop.	Note	%±
1920	3,718		—
1930	4,039		8.6%
1940	2,875		−28.8%
1950	2,606		−9.4%
1960	2,495		−4.3%
1970	2,221		−11.0%
1980	2,308		3.9%
1990	2,220		−3.8%
2000	2,519		13.5%
2010	2,801		11.2%
2020	2,413		−13.9%
2025 (est.)	2,389	▼	−1.0%
U.S. Decennial Census; 1790–1960 1900–1990; 1990–2000 2010–2020

=== 2020 census ===
As of the 2020 census, there were 2,413 people, 732 households, and 528 families in the county. The population density was 1.2 inhabitants per square mile (0.46/km^{2}). There were 882 housing units, of which 17.0% were vacant. Among occupied housing units, 53.1% were owner-occupied and 46.9% were renter-occupied. The homeowner vacancy rate was 0.0% and the rental vacancy rate was 13.1%.

Of the residents, 34.9% were under the age of 18 and 10.4% were 65 years of age or older; the median age was 28.9 years. For every 100 females there were 97.1 males, and for every 100 females age 18 and over there were 98.5 males.

The racial makeup of the county was 16.9% White, 0.0% Black or African American, 79.8% American Indian and Alaska Native, 0.1% Asian, 0.1% from some other race, and 3.0% from two or more races. Hispanic or Latino residents of any race comprised 1.4% of the population.

There were 732 households in the county, of which 48.4% had children under the age of 18 living with them and 33.6% had a female householder with no spouse or partner present. About 22.4% of all households were made up of individuals and 7.7% had someone living alone who was 65 years of age or older.

=== 2010 census ===
As of the 2010 census, there were 2,801 people, 836 households, and 638 families in the county. The population density was 1.4 inhabitants per square mile (0.54/km^{2}). There were 987 housing units at an average density of 0.5 per square mile (0.19/km^{2}). The racial makeup of the county was 74.9% American Indian, 21.8% white, 0.2% black or African American, 0.1% Asian, 0.1% from other races, and 3.0% from two or more races. Those of Hispanic or Latino origin made up 3.1% of the population.

Of the 836 households, 53.7% had children under the age of 18 living with them, 39.0% were married couples living together, 29.3% had a female householder with no husband present, 23.7% were non-families, and 20.9% of all households were made up of individuals. The average household size was 3.35 and the average family size was 3.82. The median age was 25.4 years.

The median income for a household in the county was $27,578 and the median income for a family was $22,857. Males had a median income of $28,954 versus $24,327 for females. The per capita income for the county was $11,069. About 41.9% of families and 46.0% of the population were below the poverty line, including 56.1% of those under age 18 and 22.9% of those age 65 or over.

== Communities ==
=== Cities ===
- Dupree (county seat)
- Eagle Butte (partial)

=== Census-designated places ===
- Bridger
- Cherry Creek

=== Unincorporated communities ===
- Chase
- Glad Valley
- Iron Lightning
- Red Elm
- Red Scaffold
- Thunder Butte

=== Unorganized territories ===
Ziebach County government does not include subdivision into townships. The county is divided into three areas of unorganized territory: Dupree, North Ziebach, and South Ziebach.

== Politics ==
Ziebach County has traditionally been a swing county. Only Ronald Reagan in 1980 and Barack Obama in 2008 have topped sixty percent for either major party in the past six decades. Donald Trump won 48% of the vote in 2016, being the county or equivalent he won with the highest percentage of Native Americans. Joe Biden won 53% of the vote in 2020. It flipped back to Donald Trump in 2024.

United States presidential election results for Ziebach County, South Dakota
Year	Republican		Democratic		Third party(ies)	
Year	No.	%	No.	%	No.	%
1912	0	0.00%	349	45.56%	417	54.44%
1916	275	54.89%	211	42.12%	15	2.99%
1920	507	65.42%	177	22.84%	91	11.74%
1924	659	55.01%	153	12.77%	386	32.22%
1928	759	55.00%	615	44.57%	6	0.43%
1932	462	31.36%	982	66.67%	29	1.97%
1936	561	42.53%	737	55.88%	21	1.59%
1940	691	50.15%	687	49.85%	0	0.00%
1944	331	48.32%	354	51.68%	0	0.00%
1948	463	47.24%	503	51.33%	14	1.43%
1952	779	67.68%	372	32.32%	0	0.00%
1956	627	57.05%	472	42.95%	0	0.00%
1960	568	52.59%	512	47.41%	0	0.00%
1964	447	44.66%	554	55.34%	0	0.00%
1968	449	52.58%	350	40.98%	55	6.44%
1972	486	55.86%	378	43.45%	6	0.69%
1976	369	48.49%	370	48.62%	22	2.89%
1980	523	65.05%	246	30.60%	35	4.35%
1984	429	54.17%	359	45.33%	4	0.51%
1988	362	45.53%	427	53.71%	6	0.75%
1992	328	44.93%	280	38.36%	122	16.71%
1996	375	40.32%	483	51.94%	72	7.74%
2000	384	53.26%	314	43.55%	23	3.19%
2004	447	40.05%	641	57.44%	28	2.51%
2008	312	35.02%	554	62.18%	25	2.81%
2012	314	41.26%	439	57.69%	8	1.05%
2016	368	47.98%	353	46.02%	46	6.00%
2020	404	44.59%	481	53.09%	21	2.32%
2024	388	49.68%	366	46.86%	27	3.46%

== Education ==
School districts include:

- Dupree School District 64-2
- Eagle Butte School District 20-1
- Faith School District 46-2
- Lemmon School District 52-4
- Timber Lake School District 20-3

== See also ==
- National Register of Historic Places listings in Ziebach County, South Dakota
