= Mitchell Township, Davison County, South Dakota =

Township in Davison County, South Dakota

Coordinates: 43°44′30″N 098°02′01″W

Mitchell Township is a township in Davison County, South Dakota, United States, now primarily overlaid by the city of Mitchell. Due in part to (1) rising road expenditures; (2 ) a declining tax base resulting from annexations of portions of Mitchell Township by the city of Mitchell, and (3) residents' unwillingness to increase their own property tax levy for road work, a majority of Mitchell Township residents affirmatively voted to abolish their political subdivision in 2001.

As a result of the 2001 abolition election, that part of Davison County that previously comprised Mitchell Township became unorganized territory and was governed by the Davison County Board of Commissioners.

Due to various continuing issues relating to road maintenance, accountability for tax assessments and expenditure of tax revenues, fire protection, and a general desire for local control, a special election was held in 2009 on the question of reestablishing Mitchell Township. The result of the election was positive and Mitchell Township was subsequently reorganized as a political subdivision of the State of South Dakota. Mitchell Township regained independent taxing authority and, following reorganization, is governed by an elected board of township supervisors.
