= 1948 United States presidential election in South Dakota =

- November 2, 1948

All 4 South Dakota votes to the Electoral College
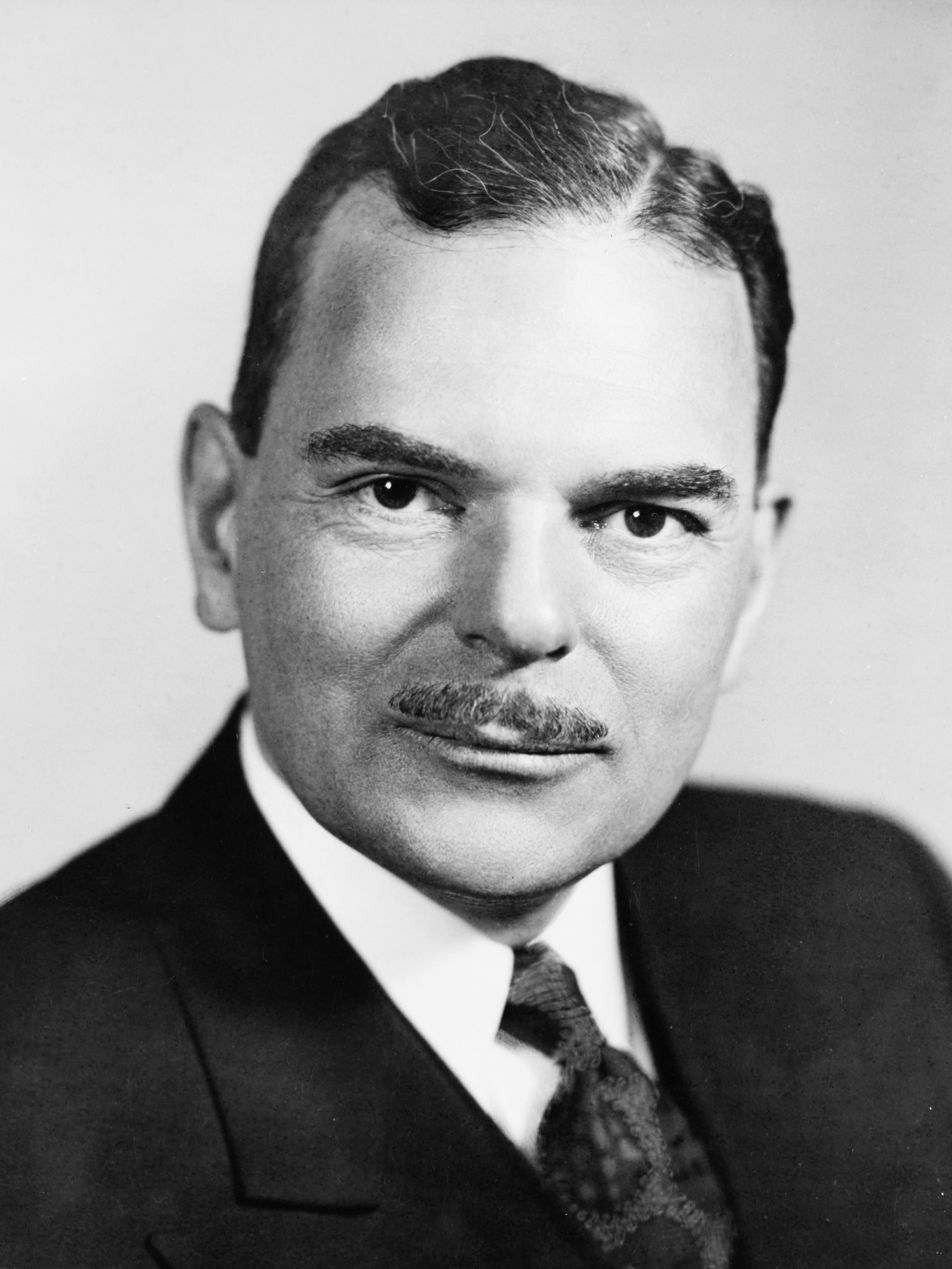

Nominee	Thomas E. Dewey	Harry S. Truman
Party	Republican	Democratic
Home state	New York	Missouri
Running mate	Earl Warren	Alben W. Barkley
Electoral vote	4	0
Popular vote	129,651	117,653
Percentage	51.84%	47.04%
County results
Dewey
40–50%
50–60%
60–70%
70–80%
Truman
40–50%
50–60%
60–70%
80–90%
Tie
40–50%
President before election
Harry S. Truman
Democratic
Elected President
Harry S. Truman
Democratic

The 1948 United States presidential election in South Dakota took place on November 2, 1948, as part of the 1948 United States presidential election. Voters chose four representatives, or electors, to the Electoral College, who voted for president and vice president.

South Dakota was won by Governor Thomas E. Dewey (R–New York), running with Governor Earl Warren, with 51.84% of the popular vote, against incumbent President Harry S. Truman (D–Missouri), running with Senator Alben W. Barkley, with 47.04% of the popular vote.

== Results ==
1948 United States presidential election in South Dakota
Party	Candidate	Votes	%
Republican	Thomas E. Dewey	129,651	51.84%
Democratic	Harry S. Truman (inc.)	117,653	47.04%
Independent	Henry A. Wallace	2,801	1.12%
Total votes		250,105	100%

=== Results by county ===
County	Thomas E. Dewey Republican		Harry S. Truman Democratic		Henry Wallace Independent		Margin		Total votes cast
County	#	%	#	%	#	%	#	%	Total votes cast
Armstrong	1	14.29%	6	85.71%	0	0.00%	-5	-71.43%	7
Aurora	1,056	45.30%	1,275	54.70%	16	0.69%	-219	-9.40%	2,331
Beadle	3,662	45.58%	4,372	54.42%	77	0.96%	-710	-8.84%	8,034
Bennett	477	38.62%	758	61.38%	17	1.38%	-281	-22.75%	1,235
Bon Homme	2,283	52.36%	2,077	47.64%	48	1.10%	206	4.72%	4,360
Brookings	3,975	57.76%	2,907	42.24%	44	0.64%	1,068	15.52%	6,882
Brown	5,632	44.07%	7,148	55.93%	192	1.50%	-1,516	-11.86%	12,780
Brule	1,056	38.48%	1,646	59.99%	42	1.53%	-590	-21.51%	2,744
Buffalo	313	48.38%	334	51.62%	5	0.77%	-21	-3.25%	647
Butte	1,726	61.84%	1,065	38.16%	51	1.83%	661	23.68%	2,791
Campbell	1,518	78.05%	410	21.08%	17	0.87%	1,108	56.97%	1,945
Charles Mix	1,800	36.47%	3,086	62.53%	49	0.99%	-1,286	-26.06%	4,935
Clark	1,625	50.59%	1,559	48.54%	28	0.87%	66	2.05%	3,212
Clay	2,228	51.09%	2,080	47.70%	53	1.22%	148	3.39%	4,361
Codington	3,349	45.01%	4,042	54.32%	50	0.67%	-693	-9.31%	7,441
Corson	1,154	49.63%	1,154	49.63%	17	0.73%	0	0.00%	2,325
Custer	1,217	56.66%	917	42.69%	14	0.65%	300	13.97%	2,148
Davison	2,996	42.03%	4,064	57.01%	68	0.95%	-1,068	-14.98%	7,128
Day	2,438	42.91%	3,146	55.38%	97	1.71%	-708	-12.46%	5,681
Deuel	1,357	49.91%	1,324	48.69%	38	1.40%	33	1.21%	2,719
Dewey	864	53.80%	727	45.27%	15	0.93%	137	8.53%	1,606
Douglas	1,301	63.71%	736	36.04%	5	0.24%	565	27.67%	2,042
Edmunds	1,493	54.00%	1,253	45.32%	19	0.69%	240	8.68%	2,765
Fall River	2,037	59.72%	1,348	39.52%	26	0.76%	689	20.20%	3,411
Faulk	1,054	51.49%	971	47.44%	22	1.07%	83	4.05%	2,047
Grant	1,972	48.57%	2,052	50.54%	36	0.89%	-80	-1.97%	4,060
Gregory	1,723	48.37%	1,793	50.34%	46	1.29%	-70	-1.97%	3,562
Haakon	753	57.92%	519	39.92%	28	2.15%	234	18.00%	1,300
Hamlin	1,608	53.98%	1,326	44.51%	45	1.51%	282	9.47%	2,979
Hand	1,402	50.47%	1,367	49.21%	9	0.32%	35	1.26%	2,778
Hanson	860	47.05%	953	52.13%	15	0.82%	-93	-5.09%	1,828
Harding	529	50.87%	479	46.06%	32	3.08%	50	4.81%	1,040
Hughes	1,739	61.43%	1,080	38.15%	12	0.42%	659	23.28%	2,831
Hutchinson	2,906	70.01%	1,209	29.13%	36	0.87%	1,697	40.88%	4,151
Hyde	817	59.25%	553	40.10%	9	0.65%	264	19.14%	1,379
Jackson	432	56.40%	321	41.91%	13	1.70%	111	14.49%	766
Jerauld	1,085	54.60%	876	44.09%	26	1.31%	209	10.52%	1,987
Jones	522	55.06%	414	43.67%	12	1.27%	108	11.39%	948
Kingsbury	2,332	62.55%	1,338	35.89%	58	1.56%	994	26.66%	3,728
Lake	2,837	56.95%	2,093	42.01%	52	1.04%	744	14.93%	4,982
Lawrence	3,778	62.50%	2,209	36.54%	58	0.96%	1,569	25.96%	6,045
Lincoln	2,771	59.51%	1,826	39.22%	59	1.27%	945	20.30%	4,656
Lyman	993	51.94%	904	47.28%	15	0.78%	89	4.65%	1,912
Marshall	1,419	44.37%	1,710	53.47%	69	2.16%	-291	-9.10%	3,198
McCook	2,064	59.46%	1,387	39.96%	20	0.58%	677	19.50%	3,471
McPherson	2,034	76.24%	611	22.90%	23	0.86%	1,423	53.34%	2,668
Meade	2,053	54.47%	1,681	44.60%	35	0.93%	372	9.87%	3,769
Mellette	482	49.33%	482	49.33%	13	1.33%	0	0.00%	977
Miner	1,188	45.92%	1,373	53.07%	26	1.01%	-185	-7.15%	2,587
Minnehaha	14,047	53.77%	11,770	45.05%	308	1.18%	2,277	8.72%	26,125
Moody	1,691	50.19%	1,630	48.38%	48	1.42%	61	1.81%	3,369
Pennington	6,392	56.01%	4,929	43.19%	92	0.81%	1,463	12.82%	11,413
Perkins	1,424	55.04%	1,096	42.37%	67	2.59%	328	12.68%	2,587
Potter	1,044	49.69%	1,039	49.45%	18	0.86%	5	0.24%	2,101
Roberts	2,211	39.12%	3,277	57.98%	164	2.90%	-1,066	-18.86%	5,652
Sanborn	990	48.03%	1,046	50.75%	25	1.21%	-56	-2.72%	2,061
Shannon	641	44.09%	803	55.23%	10	0.69%	-162	-11.14%	1,454
Spink	2,310	45.59%	2,702	53.33%	55	1.09%	-392	-7.74%	5,067
Stanley	522	58.85%	359	40.47%	6	0.68%	163	18.38%	887
Sully	579	58.37%	405	40.83%	8	0.81%	174	17.54%	992
Todd	625	43.46%	796	55.35%	17	1.18%	-171	-11.89%	1,438
Tripp	1,845	48.32%	1,918	50.24%	55	1.44%	-73	-1.91%	3,818
Turner	3,048	66.26%	1,514	32.91%	38	0.83%	1,534	33.35%	4,600
Union	2,205	49.38%	2,237	50.10%	23	0.52%	-32	-0.72%	4,465
Walworth	1,607	50.94%	1,513	47.96%	35	1.11%	94	2.98%	3,155
Washabaugh	192	45.82%	223	53.22%	4	0.95%	-31	-7.40%	419
Yankton	2,904	49.28%	2,932	49.75%	57	0.97%	-28	-0.48%	5,893
Ziebach	463	47.24%	503	51.33%	14	1.43%	-40	-4.08%	980
Totals	129,651	51.84%	117,653		2,801	1.12%	11,998	4.80%	250,105

==== Counties that flipped from Republican to Democratic ====
- Aurora
- Codington
- Corson (became tied)
- Day
- Grant
- Gregory
- Hanson
- Marshall
- Mellette (became tied)
- Miner
- Sanborn
- Shannon
- Spink
- Todd
- Tripp
- Union
- Yankton

== See also ==
- United States presidential elections in South Dakota
