= Eagle Butte (Ziebach County, South Dakota) =

Mountain in South Dakota, United States

Coordinates: 44°57′58″N 101°13′08″W

Eagle Butte (Lakota: Waŋblí Paha) is a summit in Ziebach County, South Dakota, in the United States. With an elevation of 2,480 feet (760 m), Eagle Butte is the 439th highest summit in the state of South Dakota.

Eagle Butte was so named on account of the area being a favourite hunting ground for eagles to be used for making war bonnets.
