= Nowlin, South Dakota =

Unincorporated community in South Dakota, U.S.

Coordinates: 44°02′59″N 101°18′10″W

Nowlin is an unincorporated community in Haakon County, in the U.S. state of South Dakota.

== History ==
A post office called Nowlin was established in 1890, and remained in operation until it was discontinued in 1963. The community was named for Henry J. Nowlan, of the U.S. Army (a recording error accounts for the error in spelling, which was never corrected).
