= Davison County, South Dakota =

County in South Dakota, United States

- County
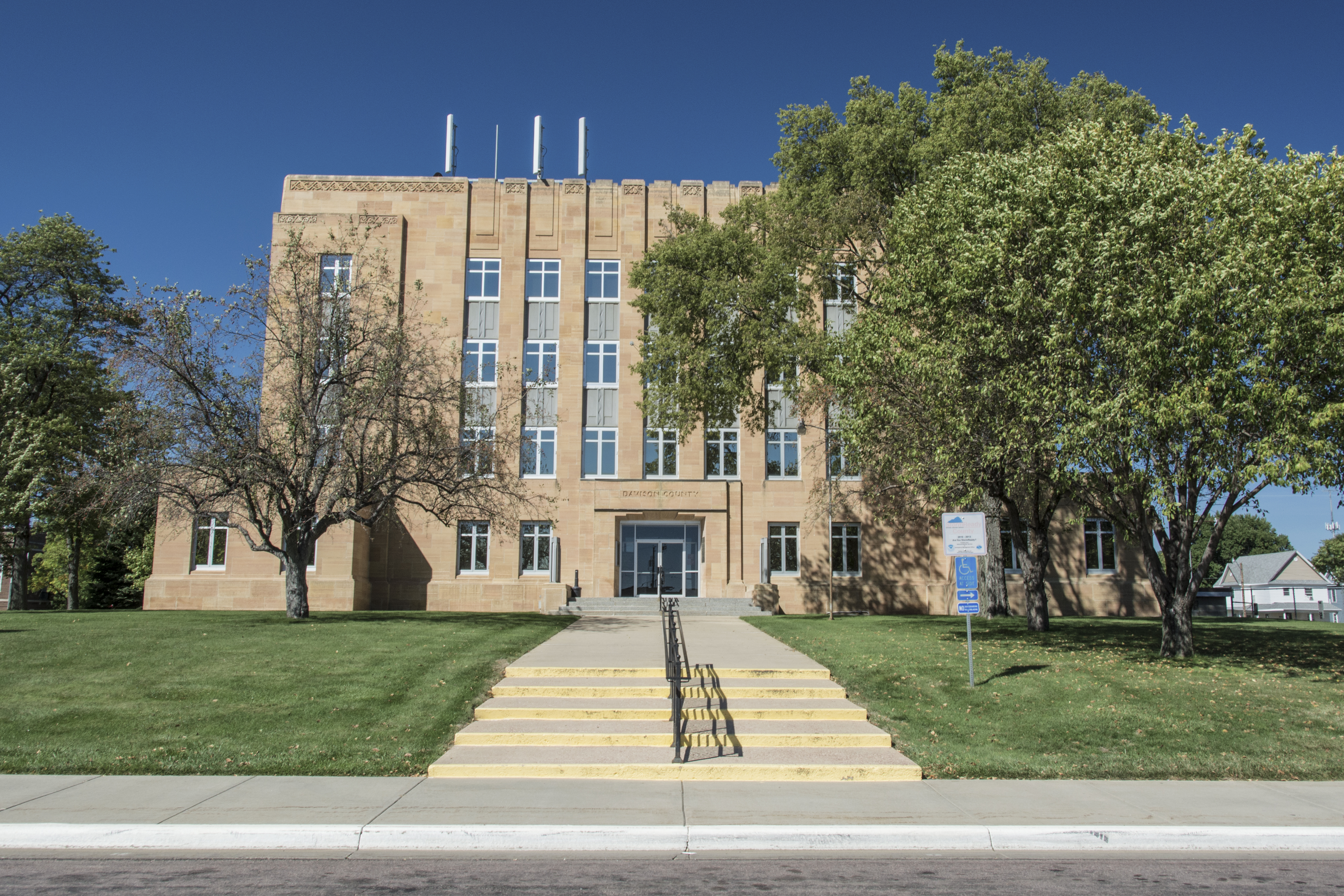
- Davison County Courthouse in Mitchell

- Location within the U.S. state of South Dakota
- Coordinates: 43°41′N 98°10′W
- Country: United States
- State: South Dakota
- Created: 1873
- Organized: 1874
- Seat: Mitchell
- Largest city: Mitchell

Area
  - Total: 437 sq mi (1,130 km^{2})
  - Land: 436 sq mi (1,130 km^{2})
  - Water: 1.4 sq mi (3.6 km^{2}) 0.3%

Population (2020)
  - Total: 19,956
  - Estimate (2025): 20,069 ▲
  - Density: 45.8/sq mi (17.7/km^{2})
- Time zone: UTC−6 (Central)
  - Summer (DST): UTC−5 (CDT)
- Congressional district: At-large
- Website: www.davisoncounty.org

Davison County is a county in the U.S. state of South Dakota. As of the 2020 census, the population was 19,956, making it the 10th most populous county in South Dakota. Its county seat is Mitchell. The county was created in 1873 and organized in 1874. It was named for Henry C. Davison, the first settler in the county.

Davison County is part of the Mitchell, SD Micropolitan Statistical Area.

== History ==
The area's first settlement occurred in 1871 in "Firesteel Creek"; the settlers were Herman Cady Greene and John Head. Greene brought lumber from Yankton in 1872 and built a frame house. The small community which grew around this house was called Firesteel. It became part of a county created by the territorial legislature in 1873.

In 1881 the territorial legislature met and considered two bills redefining the boundaries of Hanson and Davison Counties. They considered adjusting the two counties' boundaries by either combining the two, or changing their method of separation. A public vote determined to add four townships to the west, and split the two previous counties down the middle.

The settlement originally called "Arlandton" was renamed "Mount Vernon" in 1882; by 1883 it boasted a hardware store, a livery stable, lumber yard, drugstore, cigar maker, and a hotel.

During the latter part of the nineteenth century the county was served by railroad spur lines. By the mid-twentieth century, those lines had been abandoned and removed.

== Geography ==
The terrain of Davison County consists of rolling hills. Its area is largely devoted to agriculture. The James River flows south-southeastward through the NE portion of the county. A local drainage flows eastward through the upper quarter of the county, terminating in Lake Mitchell, north of the city of Mitchell. The terrain slopes to the east, and rises toward its SW corner. Its highest point is on the western portion of its southern border, at 1,667 ft (508 m) ASL.

The county has a total area of 437 square miles (1,130 km^{2}), of which 436 square miles (1,130 km^{2}) is land and 1.4 square miles (3.6 km^{2}) (0.3%) is water. It is the fourth-smallest county in South Dakota by area.

=== Major highways ===
- Interstate 90
- South Dakota Highway 37
- South Dakota Highway 42

=== Transit ===
- Jefferson Lines

=== Adjacent counties ===
- Sanborn County – north
- Hanson County – east
- Hutchinson County – southeast
- Douglas County – southwest
- Aurora County – west

== Demographics ==
Historical population
Census	Pop.	Note	%±
1880	1,256		—
1890	5,449		333.8%
1900	7,483		37.3%
1910	11,625		55.4%
1920	14,139		21.6%
1930	16,821		19.0%
1940	15,336		−8.8%
1950	16,522		7.7%
1960	16,681		1.0%
1970	17,319		3.8%
1980	17,820		2.9%
1990	17,503		−1.8%
2000	18,741		7.1%
2010	19,504		4.1%
2020	19,956		2.3%
2025 (est.)	20,069	▲	0.6%
U.S. Decennial Census; 1790–1960 1900–1990; 1990–2000 2010–2020

=== 2020 census ===
As of the 2020 census, the county had a population of 19,956. There were 8,581 households and 4,983 families residing in the county. The population density was 45.8 inhabitants per square mile (17.7/km^{2}).

Of the residents, 23.0% were under the age of 18 and 19.6% were 65 years of age or older; the median age was 39.5 years. For every 100 females there were 99.5 males, and for every 100 females age 18 and over there were 99.2 males.

The racial makeup of the county was 89.1% White, 0.8% Black or African American, 3.3% American Indian and Alaska Native, 0.6% Asian, 2.2% from some other race, and 4.0% from two or more races. Hispanic or Latino residents of any race comprised 4.6% of the population.

There were 8,581 households in the county, of which 26.6% had children under the age of 18 living with them and 26.0% had a female householder with no spouse or partner present. About 35.5% of all households were made up of individuals and 14.5% had someone living alone who was 65 years of age or older.

There were 9,484 housing units, of which 9.5% were vacant. Among occupied housing units, 60.9% were owner-occupied and 39.1% were renter-occupied. The homeowner vacancy rate was 1.7% and the rental vacancy rate was 13.1%.

=== 2010 census ===
As of the 2010 census, there were 19,504 people, 8,296 households, and 4,892 families in the county. The population density was 44.8 inhabitants per square mile (17.3/km^{2}). There were 8,852 housing units at an average density of 20.3 per square mile (7.8/km^{2}). The racial makeup of the county was 94.4% white, 2.5% American Indian, 0.5% Asian, 0.4% black or African American, 0.1% Pacific islander, 0.5% from other races, and 1.6% from two or more races. Those of Hispanic or Latino origin made up 1.5% of the population. In terms of ancestry, 51.8% were German, 10.6% were Norwegian, 10.1% were Irish, 7.4% were English, 6.0% were Dutch, and 4.5% were American.

Of the 8,296 households, 28.1% had children under the age of 18 living with them, 46.6% were married couples living together, 8.5% had a female householder with no husband present, 41.0% were non-families, and 34.3% of all households were made up of individuals. The average household size was 2.26 and the average family size was 2.91. The median age was 37.8 years.

The median income for a household in the county was $41,867 and the median income for a family was $54,677. Males had a median income of $37,688 versus $26,223 for females. The per capita income for the county was $22,794. About 6.9% of families and 13.8% of the population were below the poverty line, including 12.1% of those under age 18 and 10.4% of those age 65 or over.

== Communities ==
=== Cities ===
- Mitchell (county seat)
- Mount Vernon

=== Town ===
- Ethan

=== Census-designated place ===
- Loomis

=== Townships ===
- Badger Township
- Baker Township
- Beulah Township
- Blenden Township
- Lisbon Township
- Mitchell Township
- Mount Vernon Township
- Perry Township
- Prosper Township
- Rome Township
- Tobin Township
- Union Township

== Politics ==
Davison County voters traditionally vote Republican in presidential elections, but Bill Clinton managed to pick up a plurality of the county's vote in 1992, and 20 years earlier it gave a majority of its votes to losing Democratic candidate George McGovern, who was brought up in the county seat of Mitchell.

United States presidential election results for Davison County, South Dakota
Year	Republican		Democratic		Third party(ies)	
Year	No.	%	No.	%	No.	%
1892	569	42.81%	120	9.03%	640	48.16%
1896	616	45.13%	733	53.70%	16	1.17%
1900	853	50.27%	782	46.08%	62	3.65%
1904	1,626	68.84%	506	21.42%	230	9.74%
1908	1,276	50.92%	1,081	43.14%	149	5.95%
1912	0	0.00%	1,266	45.28%	1,530	54.72%
1916	1,516	50.48%	1,374	45.75%	113	3.76%
1920	2,605	54.16%	1,105	22.97%	1,100	22.87%
1924	2,801	51.71%	578	10.67%	2,038	37.62%
1928	3,821	58.15%	2,729	41.53%	21	0.32%
1932	2,147	28.70%	5,233	69.96%	100	1.34%
1936	2,510	32.16%	4,983	63.84%	312	4.00%
1940	3,659	46.38%	4,230	53.62%	0	0.00%
1944	2,929	47.62%	3,222	52.38%	0	0.00%
1948	2,996	42.03%	4,064	57.01%	68	0.95%
1952	4,774	59.67%	3,227	40.33%	0	0.00%
1956	4,056	51.57%	3,809	48.43%	0	0.00%
1960	4,105	49.98%	4,108	50.02%	0	0.00%
1964	2,789	36.46%	4,861	63.54%	0	0.00%
1968	3,869	50.12%	3,585	46.44%	265	3.43%
1972	3,796	44.50%	4,710	55.21%	25	0.29%
1976	3,688	44.71%	4,510	54.68%	50	0.61%
1980	4,743	55.72%	3,107	36.50%	662	7.78%
1984	4,783	59.43%	3,248	40.36%	17	0.21%
1988	4,024	51.68%	3,705	47.59%	57	0.73%
1992	3,111	38.19%	3,285	40.33%	1,750	21.48%
1996	3,371	44.78%	3,364	44.69%	793	10.53%
2000	4,445	59.05%	2,936	39.00%	147	1.95%
2004	5,561	62.12%	3,263	36.45%	128	1.43%
2008	4,731	55.96%	3,554	42.03%	170	2.01%
2012	4,757	59.68%	3,042	38.16%	172	2.16%
2016	5,157	64.85%	2,355	29.62%	440	5.53%
2020	5,613	66.39%	2,648	31.32%	193	2.28%
2024	6,208	67.65%	2,743	29.89%	226	2.46%

== See also ==
- National Register of Historic Places listings in Davison County, South Dakota
