= 1924 United States presidential election in South Dakota =

- November 4, 1924

Nominee	Calvin Coolidge	Robert M. La Follette	John W. Davis
Party	Republican	Independent	Democratic
Alliance		Progressive
Home state	Massachusetts	Wisconsin	West Virginia
Running mate	Charles G. Dawes	Burton K. Wheeler	Charles W. Bryan
Electoral vote	5	0	0
Popular vote	101,299	75,355	27,214
Percentage	49.69%	36.96%	13.35%
County results
Coolidge
30–40%
40–50%
50–60%
60–70%
70–80%
80–90%
La Follette
30–40%
40–50%
50–60%
60–70%
70–80%
President before election
Calvin Coolidge
Republican
Elected President
Calvin Coolidge
Republican

The 1924 United States presidential election in South Dakota took place on November 4, 1924, as part of the 1924 United States presidential election which was held throughout all contemporary 48 states. Voters chose five representatives, or electors to the Electoral College, who voted for president and vice president.

South Dakota voted for the Republican nominee, incumbent President Calvin Coolidge of Massachusetts, over Independent (Note: Although La Follette was nationally the nominee of the Progressive Party, he ran as an independent candidate without a party label in South Dakota.) nominee, Senator Robert M. La Follette of Wisconsin and Democratic nominee, Ambassador John W. Davis of West Virginia. Coolidge ran with former Budget Director Charles G. Dawes of Illinois, while Davis ran with Governor Charles W. Bryan of Nebraska and La Follette ran with Montana Senator Burton K. Wheeler.

Coolidge won South Dakota by a margin of 12.73% of the vote.

With 36.96 percent of the popular vote, South Dakota would prove to be La Follette's fifth strongest state in the 1924 election in terms of popular vote percentage after Wisconsin, North Dakota, Minnesota and Montana. He carried 18 counties here.

== Results ==
1924 United States presidential election in South Dakota
Party	Candidate	Running mate	Popular vote		Electoral vote	
Party	Candidate	Running mate	Count	%	Count	%
Republican	Calvin Coolidge of Massachusetts	Charles G. Dawes of Illinois	101,299	49.69%	5	100.00%
Independent	Robert M. La Follette of Wisconsin	Burton K. Wheeler of Montana	75,355	36.96%	0	0.00%
Democratic	John W. Davis of West Virginia	Charles W. Bryan of Nebraska	27,214	13.35%	0	0.00%
Total			203,868	100.00%	5	100.00%

=== Results by county ===
County	Calvin Coolidge Republican		John W. Davis Democratic		Robert M. La Follette Independent		Margin (Note: Because La Follette finished ahead of Davis in South Dakota as a whole, all margins given are Coolidge minus La Follette unless stated in the total for the county in question.)		Total votes cast
County	#	%	#	%	#	%	#	%	Total votes cast
Aurora	967	36.31%	665	24.97%	1,031	38.72%	-64	-2.40%	2,663
Beadle	3,466	53.37%	851	13.10%	2,177	33.52%	1,289	19.85%	6,494
Bennett	444	57.07%	102	13.11%	232	29.82%	212	27.25%	778
Bon Homme	1,420	41.79%	860	25.31%	1,118	32.90%	302	8.89%	3,398
Brookings	4,708	48.51%	1,010	10.41%	3,987	41.08%	721	7.43%	9,705
Brown	2,740	60.67%	361	7.99%	1,415	31.33%	1,325	29.34%	4,516
Brule	1,060	37.11%	650	22.76%	1,146	40.13%	-86	-3.01%	2,856
Buffalo	309	41.53%	225	30.24%	210	28.23%	84 (Note: In this county where Davis did run second ahead of La Follette, the margin given is Coolidge vote minus Davis vote.)	11.29%	744
Butte	1,199	55.59%	277	12.84%	681	31.57%	518	24.01%	2,157
Campbell	641	54.55%	46	3.91%	488	41.53%	153	13.02%	1,175
Charles Mix	1,680	31.22%	1,306	24.27%	2,396	44.52%	-716	-13.30%	5,382
Clark	1,684	56.85%	325	10.97%	953	32.17%	731	24.68%	2,962
Clay	1,415	42.30%	492	14.71%	1,438	42.99%	-23	-0.69%	3,345
Codington	1,862	41.38%	627	13.93%	2,011	44.69%	-149	-3.31%	4,500
Corson	1,364	56.50%	140	5.80%	910	37.70%	454	18.81%	2,414
Custer	833	53.36%	236	15.12%	492	31.52%	341	21.84%	1,561
Davison	2,801	51.71%	578	10.67%	2,038	37.62%	763	14.09%	5,417
Day	2,193	55.17%	308	7.75%	1,474	37.08%	719	18.09%	3,975
Deuel	1,362	60.32%	168	7.44%	728	32.24%	634	28.08%	2,258
Dewey	956	53.05%	222	12.32%	624	34.63%	332	18.42%	1,802
Douglas	1,125	50.25%	317	14.16%	797	35.60%	328	14.65%	2,239
Edmunds	1,043	42.38%	277	11.26%	1,141	46.36%	-98	-3.98%	2,461
Fall River	1,392	52.13%	342	12.81%	936	35.06%	456	17.08%	2,670
Faulk	1,112	56.08%	277	13.97%	594	29.95%	518	26.12%	1,983
Grant	1,227	42.02%	202	6.92%	1,491	51.06%	-264	-9.04%	2,920
Gregory	1,643	44.61%	818	22.21%	1,222	33.18%	421	11.43%	3,683
Haakon	797	49.87%	319	19.96%	482	30.16%	315	19.71%	1,598
Hamlin	1,144	52.38%	207	9.48%	833	38.14%	311	14.24%	2,184
Hand	1,727	54.00%	690	21.58%	781	24.42%	946	29.58%	3,198
Hanson	811	40.47%	299	14.92%	894	44.61%	-83	-4.14%	2,004
Harding	702	62.07%	107	9.46%	322	28.47%	380	33.60%	1,131
Hughes	1,260	53.21%	325	13.72%	783	33.07%	477	20.14%	2,368
Hutchinson	893	24.65%	180	4.97%	2,550	70.38%	-1,657	-45.74%	3,623
Hyde	669	50.53%	257	19.41%	398	30.06%	271	20.47%	1,324
Jackson	583	56.93%	194	18.95%	247	24.12%	336	32.81%	1,024
Jerauld	1,054	52.89%	228	11.44%	711	35.67%	343	17.21%	1,993
Jones	732	55.45%	141	10.68%	447	33.86%	285	21.59%	1,320
Kingsbury	2,242	65.65%	333	9.75%	840	24.60%	1,402	41.05%	3,415
Lake	1,888	45.35%	297	7.13%	1,978	47.51%	-90	-2.16%	4,163
Lawrence	3,255	71.07%	649	14.17%	676	14.76%	2,579	56.31%	4,580
Lincoln	1,825	43.81%	265	6.36%	2,076	49.83%	-251	-6.02%	4,166
Lyman	1,061	44.30%	387	16.16%	947	39.54%	114	4.76%	2,395
Marshall	1,271	51.54%	190	7.70%	1,005	40.75%	266	10.79%	2,466
McCook	1,368	44.27%	457	14.79%	1,265	40.94%	103	3.33%	3,090
McPherson	833	28.83%	94	3.25%	1,962	67.91%	-1,129	-39.08%	2,889
Meade	2,006	57.43%	786	22.50%	701	20.07%	1,220	34.93%	3,493
Mellette	642	39.93%	604	37.56%	362	22.51%	38	2.36%	1,608
Miner	995	35.65%	308	11.04%	1,488	53.31%	-493	-17.66%	2,791
Minnehaha	8,822	55.93%	1,524	9.66%	5,427	34.41%	3,395	21.52%	15,773
Moody	1,181	41.69%	234	8.26%	1,418	50.05%	-237	-8.37%	2,833
Pennington	3,201	63.57%	854	16.96%	980	19.46%	2,221	44.11%	5,035
Perkins	1,421	59.21%	277	11.54%	702	29.25%	719	29.96%	2,400
Potter	1,075	59.82%	283	15.75%	439	24.43%	636	35.39%	1,797
Roberts	1,744	40.99%	215	5.05%	2,296	53.96%	-552	-12.97%	4,255
Sanborn	1,184	47.34%	327	13.07%	990	39.58%	194	7.76%	2,501
Shannon	992	88.89%	76	6.81%	48	4.30%	916	82.08%	1,116
Spink	2,613	57.81%	595	13.16%	1,312	29.03%	1,301	28.78%	4,520
Stanley	531	43.81%	249	20.54%	432	35.64%	99	8.17%	1,212
Sully	555	59.04%	138	14.68%	247	26.28%	308	32.77%	940
Todd	837	67.01%	237	18.98%	175	14.01%	600	48.04%	1,249
Tripp	1,647	42.45%	932	24.02%	1,301	33.53%	346	8.92%	3,880
Turner	1,708	45.93%	285	7.66%	1,726	46.41%	-18	-0.48%	3,719
Union	1,665	45.04%	877	23.72%	1,155	31.24%	510	13.79%	3,697
Walworth	1,033	44.15%	114	4.87%	1,193	50.98%	-160	-6.84%	2,340
Washabaugh	246	57.88%	121	28.47%	58	13.65%	125	29.41%	425
Washington	277	87.66%	31	9.81%	8	2.53%	246	77.85%	316
Yankton	1,504	39.78%	693	18.33%	1,584	41.89%	-80	-2.12%	3,781
Ziebach	659	55.01%	153	12.77%	386	32.22%	273	22.79%	1,198
Totals	101,299	49.69%	27,214	13.35%	75,355	36.96%	25,944	12.73%	203,868

== See also ==
- United States presidential elections in South Dakota
