= 1992 United States presidential election in South Dakota =

- November 3, 1992
- Turnout: 75.0% (of registered voters) ▲3.9 pp 67.2% (of voting age population) ▲5.5 pp
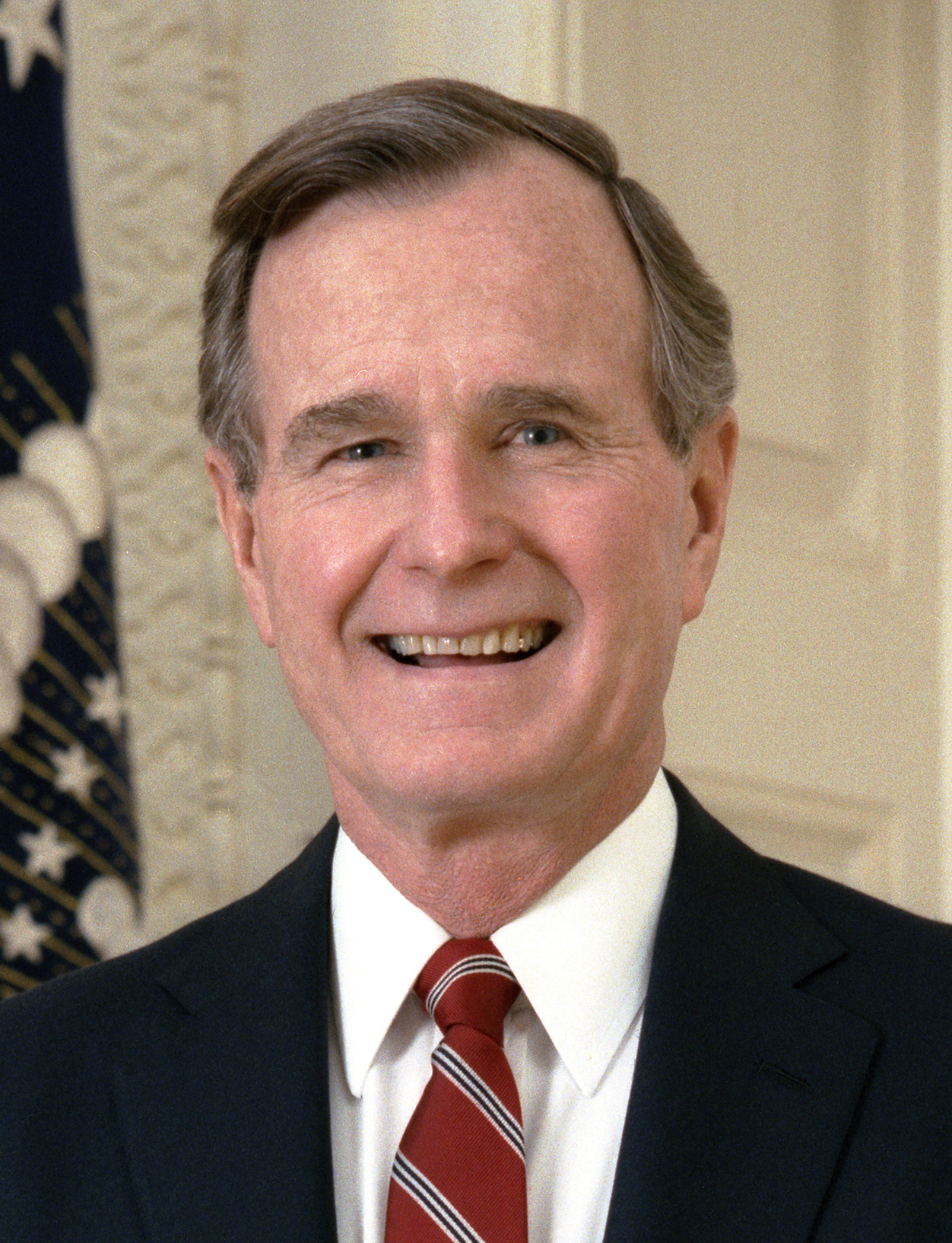

Nominee	George H. W. Bush	Bill Clinton	Ross Perot
Party	Republican	Democratic	Independent
Home state	Texas	Arkansas	Texas
Running mate	Dan Quayle	Al Gore	James Stockdale
Electoral vote	3	0	0
Popular vote	136,718	124,888	73,295
Percentage	40.66%	37.14%	21.80%
County results
Bush
30–40%
40–50%
50–60%
60–70%
Clinton
30–40%
40–50%
50–60%
70–80%
President before election
George H. W. Bush
Republican
Elected President
Bill Clinton
Democratic

The 1992 United States presidential election in South Dakota took place on November 3, 1992, as part of the 1992 United States presidential election. Voters chose three representatives, or electors to the Electoral College, who voted for president and vice president.

South Dakota was won by incumbent President George H. W. Bush (R-Texas) with 40.66% of the popular vote over Governor Bill Clinton (D-Arkansas) with 37.14%. Businessman Ross Perot (I-Texas) finished in third, with 21.80% of the popular vote. Clinton ultimately won the national vote, defeating incumbent President Bush and Perot. As of the 2024 presidential election, this is the last election in which Spink County, Hanson County, Davison County, and Aurora County voted for a Democratic presidential candidate.

Despite winning the state, Bush's 40.66% of the vote remains the worst performance for a Republican in South Dakota since Herbert Hoover's 34.4% in 1932, and the second-worst ever (after the 1932 election) for a Republican on the ballot in the state. (Note: In 1912, official national Republican nominee William Howard Taft was not on the ballot in South Dakota and received no votes. Theodore Roosevelt, who ran as a member of the Progressive Party, was listed as the Republican nominee, and received 50.88% of the vote in the state)

== Results ==
1992 United States presidential election in South Dakota
Party	Candidate	Votes	Percentage	Electoral votes
Republican	George H. W. Bush (incumbent)	136,718	40.66%	3
Democratic	Bill Clinton	124,888	37.14%	0
Independent	Ross Perot	73,295	21.80%	0
Libertarian	Andre Marrou	814	0.24%	0
Natural Law Party	Dr. John Hagelin	429	0.13%	0
New Alliance Party	Lenora Fulani	110	0.03%	0
Totals		336,254	100.0%	3

=== Results by county ===
County	George H. W. Bush Republican		Bill Clinton Democratic		Ross Perot Independent		Various candidates Other parties		Margin		Total votes cast
County	#	%	#	%	#	%	#	%	#	%	Total votes cast
Aurora	594	34.70%	680	39.72%	435	25.41%	3	0.18%	-86	-5.02%	1,712
Beadle	3,363	36.81%	3,925	42.96%	1,819	19.91%	29	0.32%	-562	-6.15%	9,136
Bennett	556	46.45%	413	34.50%	221	18.46%	7	0.58%	143	11.95%	1,197
Bon Homme	1,212	36.00%	1,294	38.43%	836	24.83%	25	0.74%	-82	-2.43%	3,367
Brookings	4,698	39.14%	4,645	38.70%	2,614	21.78%	45	0.37%	53	0.44%	12,002
Brown	6,665	36.93%	7,521	41.67%	3,812	21.12%	49	0.27%	-856	-4.74%	18,047
Brule	908	33.93%	1,060	39.61%	687	25.67%	21	0.78%	-152	-5.68%	2,676
Buffalo	137	27.62%	282	56.85%	72	14.52%	5	1.01%	-145	-29.23%	496
Butte	1,674	45.24%	973	26.30%	1,039	28.08%	14	0.38%	635 (Note: In this county where Clinton ran third behind Bush and Perot, margin given is Bush vote minus Perot vote and percentage margin Bush percentage minus Perot percentage.)	17.16%	3,700
Campbell	574	54.51%	222	21.08%	252	23.93%	5	0.47%	322	30.58%	1,053
Charles Mix	1,570	38.30%	1,639	39.99%	886	21.62%	4	0.10%	-69	-1.69%	4,099
Clark	803	33.81%	799	33.64%	761	32.04%	12	0.51%	4	0.17%	2,375
Clay	1,869	30.96%	2,826	46.82%	1,303	21.59%	38	0.63%	-957	-15.86%	6,036
Codington	3,943	36.03%	3,701	33.82%	3,262	29.81%	37	0.34%	242	2.21%	10,943
Corson	483	38.61%	444	35.49%	321	25.66%	3	0.24%	39	3.12%	1,251
Custer	1,422	42.28%	1,078	32.05%	845	25.13%	18	0.54%	344	10.23%	3,363
Davison	3,111	38.19%	3,285	40.33%	1,706	20.94%	44	0.54%	-174	-2.14%	8,146
Day	1,161	31.17%	1,578	42.36%	973	26.12%	13	0.35%	-417	-11.19%	3,725
Deuel	778	32.11%	880	36.32%	761	31.41%	4	0.17%	-102	-4.21%	2,423
Dewey	642	36.64%	766	43.72%	340	19.41%	4	0.23%	-124	-7.08%	1,752
Douglas	1,175	56.85%	481	23.27%	403	19.50%	8	0.39%	694	33.58%	2,067
Edmunds	944	41.77%	894	39.56%	415	18.36%	7	0.31%	50	2.21%	2,260
Fall River	1,533	40.84%	1,416	37.72%	792	21.10%	13	0.35%	117	3.12%	3,754
Faulk	658	45.89%	488	34.03%	281	19.60%	7	0.49%	170	11.86%	1,434
Grant	1,595	38.81%	1,484	36.11%	1,018	24.77%	13	0.32%	111	2.70%	4,110
Gregory	1,027	39.27%	879	33.61%	688	26.31%	21	0.80%	148	5.66%	2,615
Haakon	860	65.25%	209	15.86%	245	18.59%	4	0.30%	615	46.66%	1,318
Hamlin	1,133	41.35%	826	30.15%	774	28.25%	7	0.26%	307	11.20%	2,740
Hand	1,130	44.38%	785	30.83%	624	24.51%	7	0.27%	345	13.55%	2,546
Hanson	522	36.38%	566	39.44%	341	23.76%	6	0.42%	-44	-3.06%	1,435
Harding	515	58.46%	139	15.78%	225	25.54%	2	0.23%	290	32.92%	881
Hughes	4,325	53.26%	2,578	31.74%	1,160	14.28%	58	0.71%	1,747	21.52%	8,121
Hutchinson	2,002	48.17%	1,211	29.14%	920	22.14%	23	0.55%	791	19.03%	4,156
Hyde	440	46.07%	301	31.52%	211	22.09%	3	0.31%	139	14.55%	955
Jackson	627	53.68%	351	30.05%	184	15.75%	6	0.51%	276	23.63%	1,168
Jerauld	518	35.31%	600	40.90%	346	23.59%	3	0.20%	-82	-5.59%	1,467
Jones	454	58.28%	166	21.31%	154	19.77%	5	0.64%	288	36.97%	779
Kingsbury	1,113	35.41%	1,267	40.31%	744	23.67%	19	0.60%	-154	-4.90%	3,143
Lake	1,890	33.81%	2,388	42.72%	1,299	23.24%	13	0.23%	-498	-8.91%	5,590
Lawrence	3,770	39.03%	3,157	32.68%	2,673	27.67%	59	0.61%	613	6.35%	9,659
Lincoln	3,365	42.47%	2,943	37.15%	1,593	20.11%	22	0.28%	422	5.32%	7,923
Lyman	669	45.20%	486	32.84%	311	21.01%	14	0.95%	183	12.36%	1,480
Marshall	810	35.26%	1,056	45.97%	427	18.59%	4	0.17%	-246	-10.71%	2,297
McCook	1,177	39.44%	1,167	39.11%	617	20.68%	23	0.77%	10	0.33%	2,984
McPherson	945	53.94%	478	27.28%	322	18.38%	7	0.40%	467	26.66%	1,752
Meade	4,724	46.89%	2,694	26.74%	2,611	25.92%	46	0.46%	2,030	20.15%	10,075
Mellette	417	49.58%	277	32.94%	140	16.65%	7	0.83%	140	16.64%	841
Miner	543	34.28%	698	44.07%	332	20.96%	11	0.69%	-155	-9.79%	1,584
Minnehaha	25,081	39.32%	27,016	42.35%	11,496	18.02%	193	0.30%	-1,935	-3.03%	63,786
Moody	898	28.93%	1,473	47.45%	715	23.03%	18	0.58%	-575	-18.52%	3,104
Pennington	18,052	47.92%	11,106	29.48%	8,358	22.19%	153	0.41%	6,946	18.44%	37,669
Perkins	872	43.80%	566	28.43%	541	27.17%	12	0.60%	306	15.37%	1,991
Potter	901	50.67%	493	27.73%	375	21.09%	9	0.51%	408	22.94%	1,778
Roberts	1,437	34.87%	1,716	41.64%	954	23.15%	14	0.34%	-279	-6.77%	4,121
Sanborn	595	36.96%	632	39.25%	376	23.35%	7	0.43%	-37	-2.29%	1,610
Shannon	225	13.63%	1,267	76.74%	137	8.30%	22	1.33%	-1,042	-63.11%	1,651
Spink	1,527	37.14%	1,732	42.12%	839	20.40%	14	0.34%	-205	-4.98%	4,112
Stanley	719	51.39%	427	30.52%	240	17.16%	13	0.93%	292	20.87%	1,399
Sully	565	55.94%	273	27.03%	167	16.53%	5	0.50%	292	28.91%	1,010
Todd	456	27.98%	915	56.13%	246	15.09%	13	0.80%	-459	-28.15%	1,630
Tripp	1,459	43.38%	1,046	31.10%	848	25.22%	10	0.30%	413	12.28%	3,363
Turner	1,906	44.43%	1,507	35.13%	867	20.21%	10	0.23%	399	9.30%	4,290
Union	1,784	35.00%	2,210	43.36%	1,085	21.29%	18	0.35%	-426	-8.36%	5,097
Walworth	1,439	49.48%	829	28.51%	628	21.60%	12	0.41%	610	20.97%	2,908
Yankton	3,430	36.60%	3,404	36.32%	2,511	26.79%	27	0.29%	26	0.28%	9,372
Ziebach	328	44.93%	280	38.36%	117	16.03%	5	0.68%	48	6.57%	730
Totals	136,718	40.66%	124,888	37.14%	73,295	21.80%	1,353	0.40%	11,830	3.52%	336,254

==== Counties that flipped from Democratic to Republican ====
- Corson
- Ziebach

==== Counties that flipped from Republican to Democratic ====
- Beadle
- Bon Homme
- Davison
- Deuel
- Hanson
- Jerauld
- Kingsbury
- Sanborn

== See also ==
- Presidency of Bill Clinton
- United States presidential elections in South Dakota
