= 1952 United States presidential election in South Dakota =

- November 4, 1952

All 4 South Dakota votes to the Electoral College

Nominee	Dwight D. Eisenhower	Adlai Stevenson
Party	Republican	Democratic
Home state	New York	Illinois
Running mate	Richard Nixon	John Sparkman
Electoral vote	4	0
Popular vote	203,857	90,426
Percentage	69.27%	30.73%
County results
Eisenhower
50–60%
60–70%
70–80%
80–90%
90–100%
President before election
Harry S. Truman
Democratic
Elected President
Dwight D. Eisenhower
Republican

The 1952 United States presidential election in South Dakota took place on November 4, 1952, as part of the 1952 United States presidential election. Voters chose four representatives, or electors, to the Electoral College, who voted for president and vice president.

South Dakota was won by Columbia University President Dwight D. Eisenhower (R–New York), running with California Senator Richard Nixon, with 69.27 percent of the popular vote, against Illinois Governor Adlai Stevenson II (D), running with Alabama Senator John Sparkman, with 30.73 percent of the popular vote.

With 69.27% of the popular vote, South Dakota would be Eisenhower's third strongest state after Vermont and neighboring North Dakota. As of the 2024 presidential election, this is the last election in which Oglala Lakota County, known until 2015 as Shannon County and home to the Pine Ridge Indian Reservation, voted for a Republican presidential candidate. This is also the last time any presidential candidate has won every single county in the state, which occurred once before in 1904.

This was also the last time Armstrong County participated in a presidential election, as the county was abolished and absorbed into the Southern portion of Dewey County.

== Results ==
1952 United States presidential election in South Dakota
Party	Candidate	Votes	%
Republican	Dwight D. Eisenhower	203,857	69.27%
Democratic	Adlai Stevenson	90,426	30.73%
Total votes		294,283	100%

=== Results by county ===
County	Dwight D. Eisenhower Republican		Adlai Stevenson Democratic		Margin		Total votes cast
County	#	%	#	%	#	%	Total votes cast
Armstrong	6	54.55%	5	45.45%	1	9.10%	11
Aurora	1,458	59.39%	997	40.61%	461	18.78%	2,455
Beadle	6,487	65.33%	3,443	34.67%	3,044	30.66%	9,930
Bennett	873	62.85%	516	37.15%	357	25.70%	1,389
Bon Homme	3,157	65.57%	1,658	34.43%	1,499	31.14%	4,815
Brookings	5,988	76.29%	1,861	23.71%	4,127	52.58%	7,849
Brown	9,581	60.94%	6,140	39.06%	3,441	21.88%	15,721
Brule	1,578	53.13%	1,392	46.87%	186	6.26%	2,970
Buffalo	413	61.46%	259	38.54%	154	22.92%	672
Butte	2,689	76.26%	837	23.74%	1,852	52.52%	3,526
Campbell	1,536	90.14%	168	9.86%	1,368	80.28%	1,704
Charles Mix	3,316	54.31%	2,790	45.69%	526	8.62%	6,106
Clark	2,692	71.44%	1,076	28.56%	1,616	42.88%	3,768
Clay	3,302	70.05%	1,412	29.95%	1,890	40.10%	4,714
Codington	5,750	65.91%	2,974	34.09%	2,776	31.82%	8,724
Corson	1,757	69.01%	789	30.99%	968	38.02%	2,546
Custer	1,725	72.57%	652	27.43%	1,073	45.14%	2,377
Davison	4,774	59.67%	3,227	40.33%	1,547	19.34%	8,001
Day	3,648	60.81%	2,351	39.19%	1,297	21.62%	5,999
Deuel	2,279	72.17%	879	27.83%	1,400	44.34%	3,158
Dewey	1,301	66.34%	660	33.66%	641	32.68%	1,961
Douglas	2,103	79.93%	528	20.07%	1,575	59.86%	2,631
Edmunds	2,178	68.25%	1,013	31.75%	1,165	36.50%	3,191
Fall River	2,863	73.96%	1,008	26.04%	1,855	47.92%	3,871
Faulk	1,619	68.69%	738	31.31%	881	37.38%	2,357
Grant	3,234	68.31%	1,500	31.69%	1,734	36.62%	4,734
Gregory	2,463	64.22%	1,372	35.78%	1,091	28.44%	3,835
Haakon	1,176	74.81%	396	25.19%	780	49.62%	1,572
Hamlin	2,391	71.48%	954	28.52%	1,437	42.96%	3,345
Hand	2,262	70.71%	937	29.29%	1,325	41.42%	3,199
Hanson	1,320	63.07%	773	36.93%	547	26.14%	2,093
Harding	809	73.35%	294	26.65%	515	46.70%	1,103
Hughes	2,932	75.86%	933	24.14%	1,999	51.72%	3,865
Hutchinson	4,322	83.16%	875	16.84%	3,447	66.32%	5,197
Hyde	1,051	72.78%	393	27.22%	658	45.56%	1,444
Jackson	607	70.50%	254	29.50%	353	41.00%	861
Jerauld	1,520	69.19%	677	30.81%	843	38.38%	2,197
Jones	739	69.59%	323	30.41%	416	39.18%	1,062
Kingsbury	3,703	78.25%	1,029	21.75%	2,674	56.50%	4,732
Lake	4,020	73.28%	1,466	26.72%	2,554	46.56%	5,486
Lawrence	5,559	76.57%	1,701	23.43%	3,858	53.14%	7,260
Lincoln	4,387	78.35%	1,212	21.65%	3,175	56.70%	5,599
Lyman	1,561	70.09%	666	29.91%	895	40.18%	2,227
Marshall	2,248	66.45%	1,135	33.55%	1,113	32.90%	3,383
McCook	2,991	72.63%	1,127	27.37%	1,864	45.26%	4,118
McPherson	2,915	86.99%	436	13.01%	2,479	73.98%	3,351
Meade	3,109	69.98%	1,334	30.02%	1,775	39.96%	4,443
Mellette	787	69.40%	347	30.60%	440	38.80%	1,134
Miner	1,964	65.62%	1,029	34.38%	935	31.24%	2,993
Minnehaha	23,559	71.50%	9,390	28.50%	14,169	43.00%	32,949
Moody	2,728	71.47%	1,089	28.53%	1,639	42.94%	3,817
Pennington	11,029	71.16%	4,470	28.84%	6,559	42.32%	15,499
Perkins	2,160	71.78%	849	28.22%	1,311	43.56%	3,009
Potter	1,625	73.73%	579	26.27%	1,046	47.46%	2,204
Roberts	3,566	58.56%	2,524	41.44%	1,042	17.12%	6,090
Sanborn	1,761	66.05%	905	33.95%	856	32.10%	2,666
Shannon	957	55.29%	774	44.71%	183	10.58%	1,731
Spink	3,693	65.06%	1,983	34.94%	1,710	30.12%	5,676
Stanley	695	70.63%	289	29.37%	406	41.26%	984
Sully	860	70.96%	352	29.04%	508	41.92%	1,212
Todd	1,025	62.65%	611	37.35%	414	25.30%	1,636
Tripp	2,790	65.88%	1,445	34.12%	1,345	31.76%	4,235
Turner	4,604	82.39%	984	17.61%	3,620	64.78%	5,588
Union	3,393	67.35%	1,645	32.65%	1,748	34.70%	5,038
Walworth	2,369	65.24%	1,262	34.76%	1,107	30.48%	3,631
Washabaugh	319	68.45%	147	31.55%	172	36.90%	466
Yankton	4,802	68.39%	2,220	31.61%	2,582	36.78%	7,022
Ziebach	779	67.68%	372	32.32%	407	35.36%	1,151
Totals	203,857	69.27%	90,426	30.73%	113,431	38.54%	294,283

==== Counties that flipped from Democratic to Republican ====
- Aurora
- Armstrong
- Beadle
- Bennett
- Brown
- Brule
- Buffalo
- Charles Mix
- Codington
- Corson (was tied)
- Gregory
- Grant
- Day
- Davison
- Hanson
- Marshall
- Mellette (was tied)
- Miner
- Roberts
- Shannon
- Sanborn
- Spink
- Todd
- Union
- Tripp
- Washabaugh
- Yankton
- Ziebach

== See also ==
- United States presidential elections in South Dakota
