= Washington County, South Dakota =

County of South Dakota from 1883 to 1943

Coordinates: 44.588°N 97.555°W

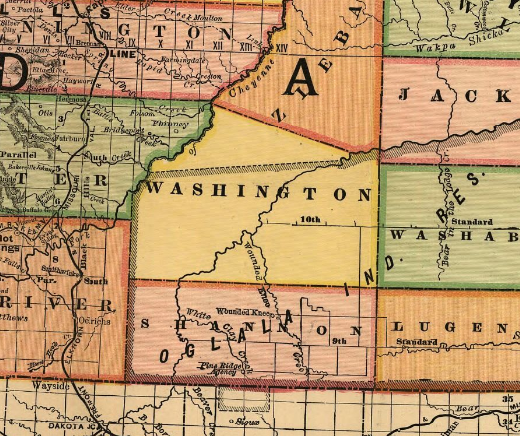
1892 map of South Dakota showing Washington County as it then appeared.

Washington County is a former county of South Dakota, existing from 1883 to 1943. The county was mostly within the boundaries of the Pine Ridge Indian Reservation.

On July 1, 1943, Washington County was divided and then merged into Jackson County, Pennington County, and Shannon County because of financial troubles in South Dakota. For several years prior to its dissolution, Washington County was unorganized and was administered by Pennington County. Part of Washington County had previously been partitioned into the newly created Bennett County in 1909.

== Sources ==
- "The Buffalo Gap Argus is mistaken..." The Rapid City Daily Journal. Rapid City, SD. February 24, 1886. p. 2 – via Newspapers.com.
- "Washington Annexed". The Rapid City Daily Journal. Rapid City, SD. July 2, 1943. p. 5 – via Newspapers.com.
- "Trust Property Audit Proposed". Argus-Leader. October 26, 1943. p. 4 – via Newspapers.com.
