= Haakon County, South Dakota =

County in South Dakota, United States

- County
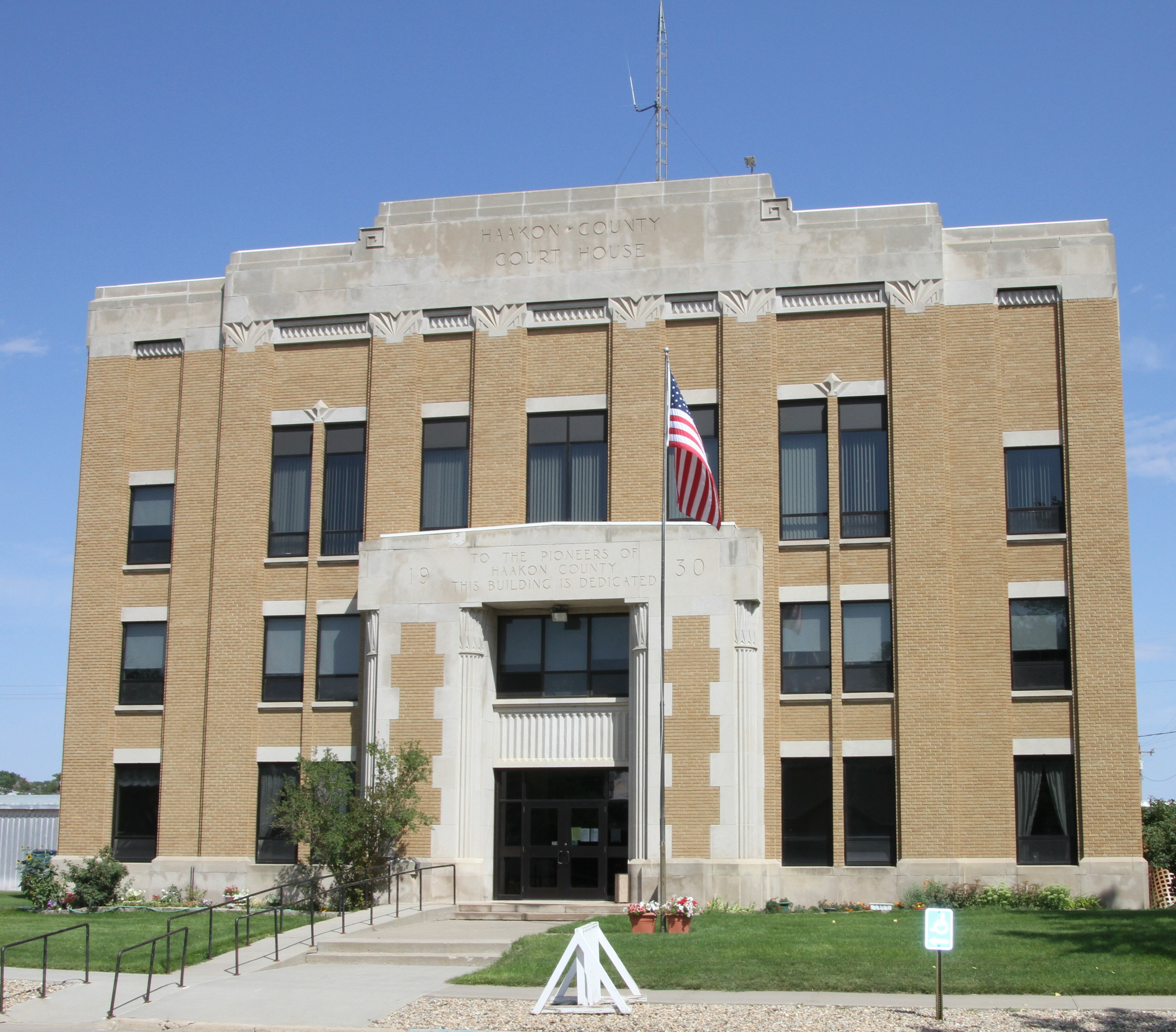
- Haakon County Courthouse in Philip

- Location within the U.S. state of South Dakota
- Coordinates: 44°18′N 101°32′W
- Country: United States
- State: South Dakota
- Created: 1914
- Organized: 1915
- Named for: Haakon VII, King of Norway
- Seat: Philip
- Largest city: Philip

Area
  - Total: 1,827 sq mi (4,730 km^{2})
  - Land: 1,811 sq mi (4,690 km^{2})
  - Water: 16 sq mi (41 km^{2}) 0.9%

Population (2020)
  - Total: 1,872
  - Estimate (2025): 1,802 ▼
  - Density: 1.034/sq mi (0.3991/km^{2})
- Time zone: UTC−7 (Mountain)
  - Summer (DST): UTC−6 (MDT)
- Congressional district: At-large
- Website: haakon.southdakotadirectors.com

Haakon County (/ˈhɑːkən/;) is a county in the U.S. state of South Dakota. As of the 2020 census, the population was 1,872. Its county seat is Philip.

== History ==
The county was created in 1914 and organized in 1915, and was formed from the original counties of Nowlin and most of Sterling, which had previously been absorbed by Stanley County. It is named for Haakon VII, who became king of Norway in 1905, in order to attract Norwegian settlers to the county. It is the only county in South Dakota named for a non-American person and is one of only nine counties in South Dakota named for persons who did not live in South Dakota. Most of South Dakota's counties are named for early South Dakota officials or legislators, or for physical features (Fall River and Lake), or are derived from Native American words (Minnehaha and Yankton), or from counties in other states (Jones and Walworth), with one (Aurora) named for a Roman goddess, one for an animal (Buffalo), and one (Union) for a concept.

== Geography ==
The terrain of Haakon County consists of semi-arid rolling hills, carved with gullies and drainages, partially devoted to agriculture. The Cheyenne River, a tributary of the Missouri River, flows northeastward along the county's north boundary line, and the Bad River flows east-northeastward through the lower part of the county, both heading for their discharge points into the Missouri. The terrain slopes to the northeast, and its highest point is near the midpoint of its western boundary line, at 2,802 ft (854 m) ASL.

Haakon County has a total area of 1,827 square miles (4,730 km^{2}), of which 1,811 square miles (4,690 km^{2}) is land and 16 square miles (41 km^{2}) (0.9%) is water.

The eastern portion of South Dakota's counties (48 of 66) observe Central Time; the western counties (18 of 66) observe Mountain Time. Haakon County is the easternmost of the SD counties to observe Mountain Time.

=== Major highways ===
- U.S. Highway 14
- South Dakota Highway 34
- South Dakota Highway 63
- South Dakota Highway 73

=== Adjacent counties ===
- Ziebach County – north
- Stanley County – east
- Jones County – southeast (observes Central Time)
- Jackson County – south
- Pennington County – west

=== Protected areas ===
- Billsburg State Game Production Area
- Cheyenne State Game Production Area (part)

=== Lakes ===
- Waggoner Lake

== Demographics ==
Historical population
Census	Pop.	Note	%±
1920	4,596		—
1930	4,679		1.8%
1940	3,515		−24.9%
1950	3,167		−9.9%
1960	3,303		4.3%
1970	2,802		−15.2%
1980	2,794		−0.3%
1990	2,624		−6.1%
2000	2,196		−16.3%
2010	1,937		−11.8%
2020	1,872		−3.4%
2025 (est.)	1,802	▼	−3.7%
U.S. Decennial Census; 1790–1960 1900–1990; 1990–2000 2010–2020

=== 2020 census ===
As of the 2020 census, there were 1,872 people, 773 households, and 510 families residing in the county; 22.6% of the residents were under the age of 18 and 23.6% were 65 years of age or older, and the median age was 43.3 years. For every 100 females there were 106.4 males, and for every 100 females age 18 and over there were 106.1 males. The population density was 1.0 inhabitant per square mile (0.39/km^{2}). The racial makeup of the county was 91.9% White, 0.1% Black or African American, 1.8% American Indian and Alaska Native, 0.7% Asian, 0.9% from some other race, and 4.4% from two or more races. Hispanic or Latino residents of any race comprised 1.0% of the population. Of the 773 households, 27.2% had children under the age of 18 living with them and 18.5% had a female householder with no spouse or partner present. About 28.5% of all households were made up of individuals and 14.2% had someone living alone who was 65 years of age or older. There were 931 housing units, of which 17.0% were vacant. Among occupied housing units, 78.1% were owner-occupied and 21.9% were renter-occupied. The homeowner vacancy rate was 0.5% and the rental vacancy rate was 9.5%.

=== 2010 census ===
As of the 2010 census, there were 1,937 people, 850 households, and 540 families in the county. The population density was 1.1 inhabitants per square mile (0.42/km^{2}). There were 1,013 housing units at an average density of 0.6 per square mile (0.23/km^{2}). The racial makeup of the county was 94.7% white, 1.9% American Indian, 0.4% Asian, 0.2% black or African American, 0.1% Pacific islander, 0.2% from other races, and 2.6% from two or more races. Those of Hispanic or Latino origin made up 0.9% of the population. In terms of ancestry, 45.4% were German, 19.4% were Irish, 17.6% were Norwegian, 8.6% were English, 6.2% were Czech, 5.1% were Dutch, and 1.2% were American.

Of the 850 households, 23.8% had children under the age of 18 living with them, 56.6% were married couples living together, 4.2% had a female householder with no husband present, 36.5% were non-families, and 33.2% of all households were made up of individuals. The average household size was 2.24 and the average family size was 2.86. The median age was 48.8 years.

The median income for a household in the county was $46,281 and the median income for a family was $60,000. Males had a median income of $37,679 versus $22,277 for females. The per capita income for the county was $25,877. About 13.2% of families and 12.5% of the population were below the poverty line, including 14.9% of those under age 18 and 13.7% of those age 65 or over.

== Communities ==
=== Towns ===
- Philip (county seat)
- Midland

=== Unincorporated communities ===
- Billsburg
- Kirley
- Milesville
- Nowlin
- Ottumwa
- West Fork

=== Unorganized territories ===
- East Haakon
- West Haakon

== Politics ==
The Haakon County voters are reliably Republican. In no national election since 1936 has the county selected the Democratic Party candidate.

United States presidential election results for Haakon County, South Dakota
Year	Republican		Democratic		Third party(ies)	
Year	No.	%	No.	%	No.	%
1916	399	41.05%	475	48.87%	98	10.08%
1920	713	49.65%	393	27.37%	330	22.98%
1924	797	49.87%	319	19.96%	482	30.16%
1928	1,255	64.33%	663	33.98%	33	1.69%
1932	797	35.68%	1,245	55.73%	192	8.59%
1936	933	47.70%	948	48.47%	75	3.83%
1940	1,129	61.49%	707	38.51%	0	0.00%
1944	638	62.61%	381	37.39%	0	0.00%
1948	753	57.92%	519	39.92%	28	2.15%
1952	1,176	74.81%	396	25.19%	0	0.00%
1956	936	61.18%	594	38.82%	0	0.00%
1960	980	62.22%	595	37.78%	0	0.00%
1964	795	54.56%	662	45.44%	0	0.00%
1968	759	60.96%	377	30.28%	109	8.76%
1972	1,021	73.14%	366	26.22%	9	0.64%
1976	812	61.89%	477	36.36%	23	1.75%
1980	1,162	79.32%	255	17.41%	48	3.28%
1984	1,168	82.84%	237	16.81%	5	0.35%
1988	958	70.91%	379	28.05%	14	1.04%
1992	860	65.25%	209	15.86%	249	18.89%
1996	887	68.81%	284	22.03%	118	9.15%
2000	938	83.08%	164	14.53%	27	2.39%
2004	1,007	81.21%	219	17.66%	14	1.13%
2008	939	81.44%	187	16.22%	27	2.34%
2012	940	86.08%	138	12.64%	14	1.28%
2016	936	89.66%	77	7.38%	31	2.97%
2020	1,026	90.24%	105	9.23%	6	0.53%
2024	1,004	89.24%	105	9.33%	16	1.42%

== Education ==
School districts include Haakon School District 27-1 and Kadoka School District 35-2.

== See also ==
- National Register of Historic Places listings in Haakon County, South Dakota
