= 2016 South Dakota Democratic presidential primary =

- June 7, 2016

Candidate	Hillary Clinton	Bernie Sanders
Home state	New York	Vermont
Delegate count	10	10
Popular vote	27,047	25,959
Percentage	51.03%	48.97%
Election results by county.
Clinton
50 – 60%
60 – 70%
Sanders
50 – 60%
60 – 70%
70 – 80%
Tie
50%

The 2016 South Dakota Democratic presidential primary was held on June 7 in the U.S. state of South Dakota as one of the Democratic Party's primaries ahead of the 2016 presidential election.

The Democratic Party's primaries in California, Montana, New Jersey and New Mexico were held the same day, as are Republican primaries in the same five states, including their own South Dakota primary. Additionally, the Democratic Party held North Dakota caucuses the same day.

== Opinion polling ==
Poll source	Date	1st	2nd	Others / Undecided
Official Primary results	June 7, 2016	Hillary Clinton; 51.0%	Bernie Sanders; 49.0%	
Targeted Persuasion Margin of error: ±3.31% Sample size: 874	May 23–24, 2016	Hillary Clinton; 50%	Bernie Sanders; 47%	Undecided; 3%

== Results ==
South Dakota Democratic primary, June 7, 2016
Candidate	Popular vote		Estimated delegates		
Candidate	Count	Percentage	Pledged	Unpledged	Total
Hillary Clinton	27,047	51.03%	10	2	12
Bernie Sanders	25,959	48.97%	10	0	10
Uncommitted	—N/a		0	3	3
Total	53,006	100%	20	5	25

=== Results by county ===
County	Clinton	Votes	Sanders	Votes
Aurora	53.19%	150	46.81%	132
Beadle	57.32%	501	42.68%	373
Bennett	43.79%	74	56.21%	95
Bon Homme	53.32%	225	46.68%	197
Brookings	51.45%	955	48.55%	901
Brown	54.61%	1,369	45.39%	1,138
Brule	45.39%	182	54.61%	219
Buffalo	60.77%	110	39.23%	71
Butte	37.03%	167	62.97%	284
Campbell	43.48%	20	56.52%	26
Charles Mix	51.40%	293	48.60%	277
Clark	56.57%	112	43.43%	86
Clay	50.57%	623	49.43%	609
Codington	56.21%	828	43.79%	645
Corson	43.73%	115	56.27%	148
Custer	47.02%	245	52.98%	276
Davison	55.19%	542	44.81%	440
Day	62.82%	343	37.18%	203
Deuel	59.34%	162	40.66%	111
Dewey	34.61%	181	65.39%	342
Douglas	56.47%	48	43.53%	37
Edmunds	52.31%	170	47.69%	155
Fall River	40.51%	207	59.49%	304
Faulk	52.44%	86	47.56%	78
Grant	55.76%	528	44.24%	419
Gregory	52.19%	179	47.81%	164
Haakon	30.26%	23	69.74%	53
Hamlin	59.15%	181	40.85%	125
Hand	51.72%	105	48.28%	98
Hanson	53.89%	97	46.11%	83
Harding	25.93%	14	74.07%	40
Hughes	51.92%	528	48.08%	489
Hutchinson	54.71%	151	45.29%	125
Hyde	60.61%	40	39.39%	26
Jackson	46.09%	59	53.91%	69
Jerauld	59.63%	96	40.37%	65
Jones	39.22%	20	60.78%	31
Kingsbury	55.07%	201	44.93%	164
Lake	51.49%	484	48.51%	456
Lawrence	42.83%	705	57.17%	941
Lincoln	55.49%	1,436	44.51%	1,152
Lyman	50.00%	115	50.00%	115
Marshall	62.94%	287	37.06%	169
McCook	61.85%	214	38.15%	132
McPherson	50.54%	47	49.46%	46
Meade	43.27%	530	56.73%	695
Mellette	39.68%	50	60.32%	76
Miner	56.48%	109	43.52%	84
Minnehaha	53.22%	6,018	46.78%	5,290
Moody	55.86%	262	44.14%	207
Oglala Lakota	42.54%	425	57.46%	574
Pennington	45.85%	3,384	54.15%	3,996
Perkins	31.62%	43	68.38%	93
Potter	52.21%	59	47.79%	54
Roberts	49.68%	392	50.32%	397
Sanborn	59.46%	66	40.54%	45
Spink	58.47%	283	41.53%	201
Stanley	48.22%	95	51.78%	102
Sully	42.05%	37	57.95%	51
Todd	43.78%	408	56.22%	524
Tripp	48.06%	136	51.94%	147
Turner	56.59%	232	43.41%	178
Union	55.39%	380	44.61%	306
Walworth	51.05%	121	48.95%	116
Yankton	54.90%	706	45.10%	580
Ziebach	41.07%	92	58.93%	132
Total	51.03%	27,047	48.97%	25,959

== Analysis ==
South Dakota, a predominantly white and rural state in the Great Plains with a significant Native American population, was split near evenly between Clinton and Sanders in terms of geography and delegate count. Secretary Clinton carried the eastern portion of the state, with the exception of Roberts County in the northeast corner. She edged out Sanders in Minnehaha County, the most populated county and home to Sioux Falls. Lincoln County (Canton), Brown County (Aberdeen), Brookings County (Brookings), Codington County, (Watertown), Yankton County (Yankton, South Dakota), Davison County (Mitchell), and Hughes County (home to the state capital Pierre), all gave Clinton substantial margins that were enough for her to carry one of the most Republican states in the country.

Senator Bernie Sanders kept the race close by winning the western portion, which is far more rural than the eastern half and tends to vote more Republican in presidential elections. The most populated county in the region and second most populous in the state, Pennington County, home to Rapid City, gave Sanders an 8.3% margin over Clinton. Sanders also carried the counties of Oglala Lakota, Jackson, and Bennett, which are part of the Pine Ridge Indian Reservation. These counties are among the most poverty stricken in the United States (as Sanders tends to do well among voters with low incomes), with the census-designated place of Allen in Bennett County being considered the poorest municipality in the entire country. Sanders also carried several other Native American reservations including neighboring Rosebud Indian Reservation to the east, the Cheyenne River Indian Reservation to the north, and its neighbor Standing Rock Sioux Reservation, part of which stretches into North Dakota.

Sanders had visited the Pine Ridge reservation in May, where he spoke to residents and was warmly welcomed by Native American tribal leaders, talking about the need to improve health care and education on reservations and maintain tribal sovereignty. Other issues brought up by Sanders including the Keystone Pipeline and fracking, which many Native Americans had expressed opposition towards. Another likely reason for the large amount of Native American support for Sanders was towards a controversial comment Secretary Clinton made in April after Donald Trump became the presumptive nominee where she stated, "I have a lot of experience dealing with men who sometimes get off the reservation in the way they behave and how they speak." The remarks were considered offensive by many people, and likely benefitted Sanders (though Clinton appeared to do well among Native Americans in New Mexico the same day).

== See also ==
- 2016 South Dakota Republican presidential primary
