= Vetal, South Dakota =

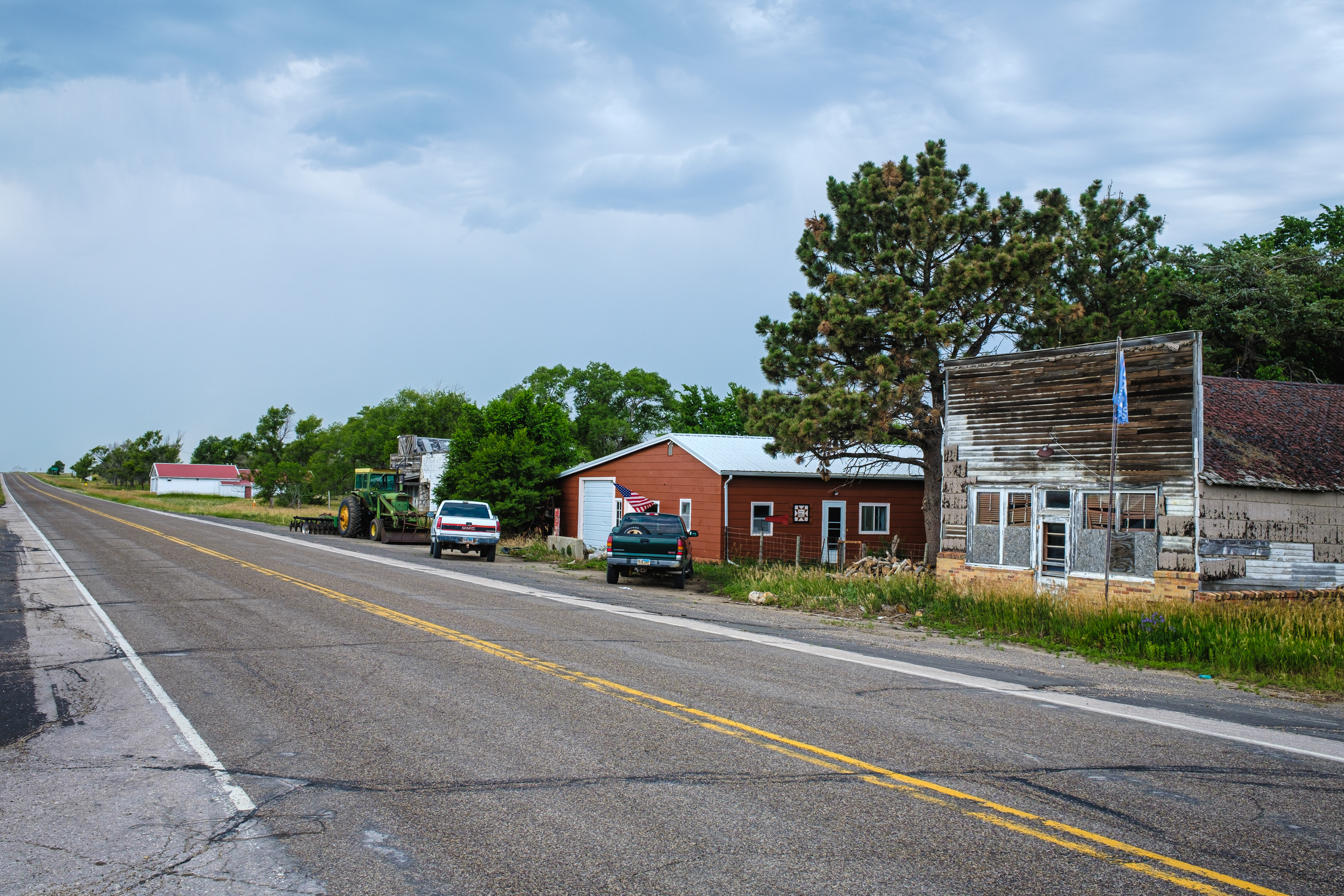
- View from Highway 18

- Location within the state of South Dakota Vetal (the United States)
- Coordinates: 43°12′52″N 101°22′37″W
- Country: United States
- State: South Dakota
- County: Bennett
- Time zone: UTC-7 (Mountain (MST))
  - Summer (DST): UTC-6 (MDT)
- GNIS feature ID: 1258748

Vetal is an unincorporated community in Bennett County, in the U.S. state of South Dakota.

== History ==
The community was named for Vetal Valandry, a pioneer settler. A post office was established in 1912, and remained in operation until 1967.

== Education ==
The Bennett County School District serves all of Bennett County.
