= Blackpipe, South Dakota =

Blackpipe
- Unincorporated community
- Location within the state of South Dakota Blackpipe (the United States)
- Coordinates: 43°20′38″N 101°16′29″W
- Country: United States
- State: South Dakota
- County: Bennett
- Elevation: 2,917 ft (889 m)
- Time zone: UTC-7 (Mountain (MST))
  - Summer (DST): UTC-6 (MDT)
- GNIS feature ID: 1261097

Blackpipe is an unincorporated community in Bennett County, South Dakota, United States. GNIS also states a post office was there in 1940.

Prior to the opening of a convenience store in 2014, residents had to travel across county lines to Parmelee or White River to get gas. The store was funded by the Rosebud Sioux Tribe and the Four Band Community Fund, Inc. in Eagle Butte.

== Education ==
The Bennett County School District serves all of Bennett County.
