= Plenty Bears, South Dakota =

Plenty Bears
- Unincorporated community
- Location within the state of South Dakota Plenty Bears (the United States)
- Coordinates: 43°16′23″N 101°50′32″W
- Country: United States
- State: South Dakota
- County: Bennett
- Elevation: 3,146 ft (959 m)
- Time zone: UTC-7 (Mountain (MST))
  - Summer (DST): UTC-6 (MDT)
- GNIS feature ID: 1266608

Plenty Bears is an unincorporated community in Bennett County, South Dakota, United States.
