= Harrington, South Dakota =

Unincorporated community in South Dakota, U.S.

Coordinates: 43°10′16″N 101°15′17″W

Harrington is an unincorporated community in Bennett County, in the U.S. state of South Dakota.

== History ==
Harrington was laid out in 1924. A post office was established at Harrington in 1924, and remained in operation until 1976.

== Education ==
The Bennett County School District serves all of Bennett County.
