= Martin Municipal Airport =

- IATA: none; ICAO: none; FAA LID: 9V6

Summary
- Airport type: Public
- Owner: City of Martin
- Serves: Martin, South Dakota
- Elevation AMSL: 3,295 ft / 1,004 m
- Coordinates: 43°09′56″N 101°42′46″W

Map
- Location of airport in South Dakota 9V6 (the United States)

Runways
Direction	Length		Surface
Direction	ft	m	Surface
14/32	3,699	1,127	Asphalt

Statistics (2023)
- Aircraft operations (year ending 4/26/2023): 348
- Based aircraft: 3
- Source: Federal Aviation Administration

Martin Municipal Airport (FAA LID: 9V6) is a city-owned, public-use airport located one nautical mile (2 km) southeast of the central business district of Martin, a city in Bennett County, South Dakota, United States. It is included in the National Plan of Integrated Airport Systems for 2011–2015, which categorized it as a general aviation facility.

== Facilities and aircraft ==
Martin Municipal Airport covers an area of 183 acres (74 ha) at an elevation of 3,295 feet (1,004 m) above mean sea level. It has one runway designated 14/32 with an asphalt surface measuring 3,699 by 60 feet (1,127 x 18 m).

For the 12-month period ending April 26, 2023, the airport had 348 general aviation aircraft operations, an average of 29 per month. At that time there were 3 aircraft based at this airport: all single-engine.

== See also ==
- List of airports in South Dakota
