= 2016 South Dakota Republican presidential primary =

- June 7, 2016

29 pledged delegates to the Republican National Convention
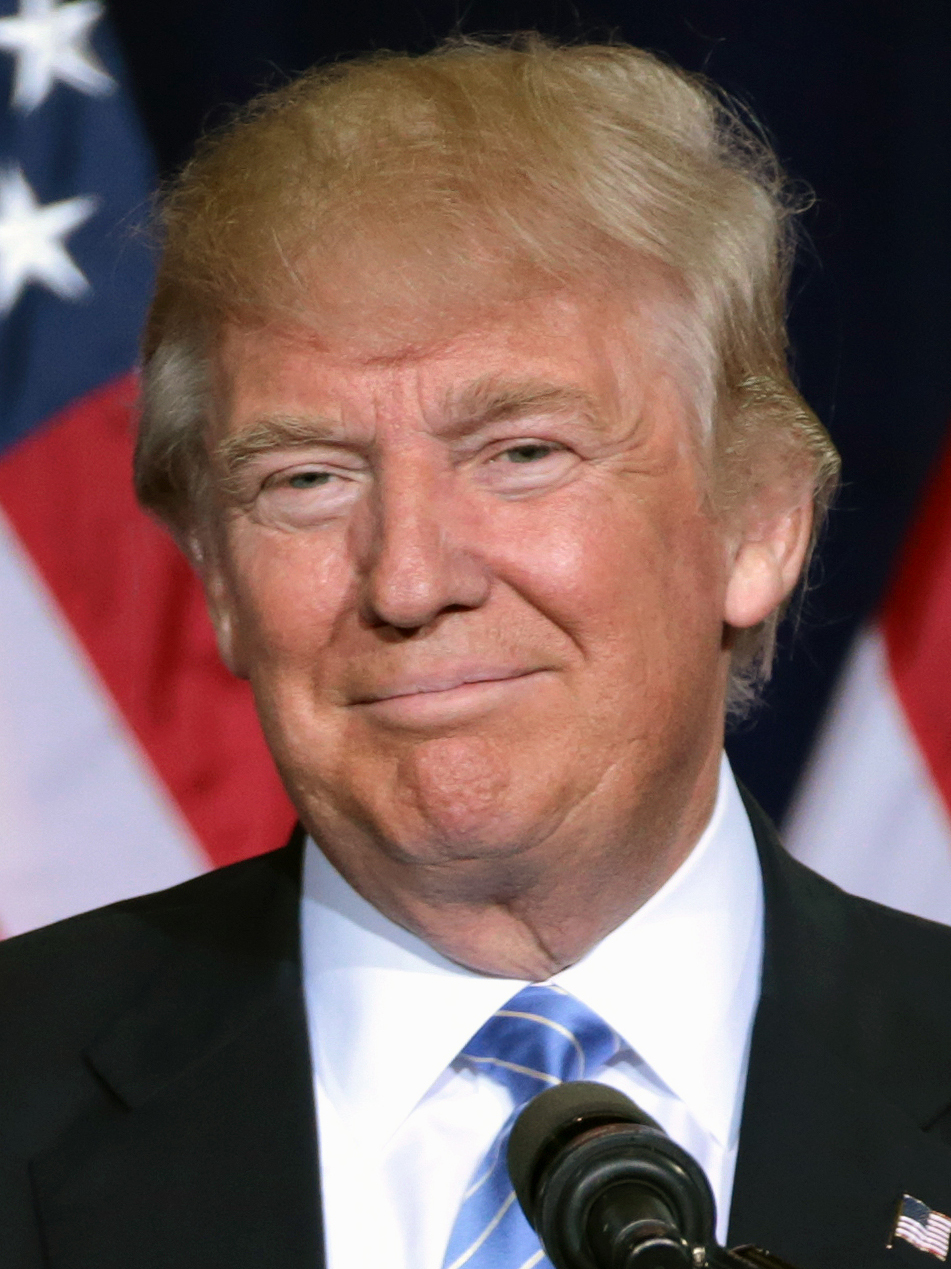

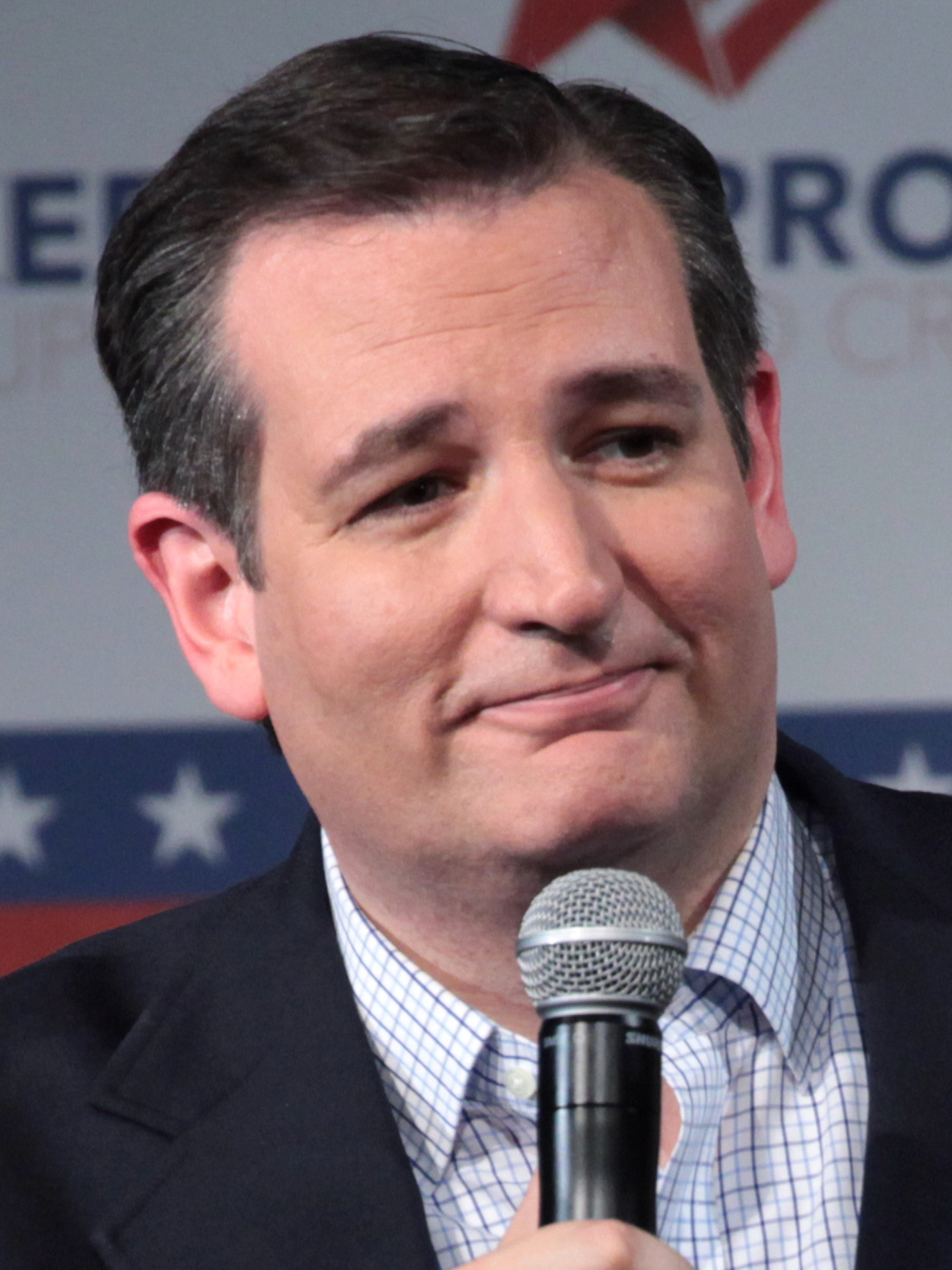

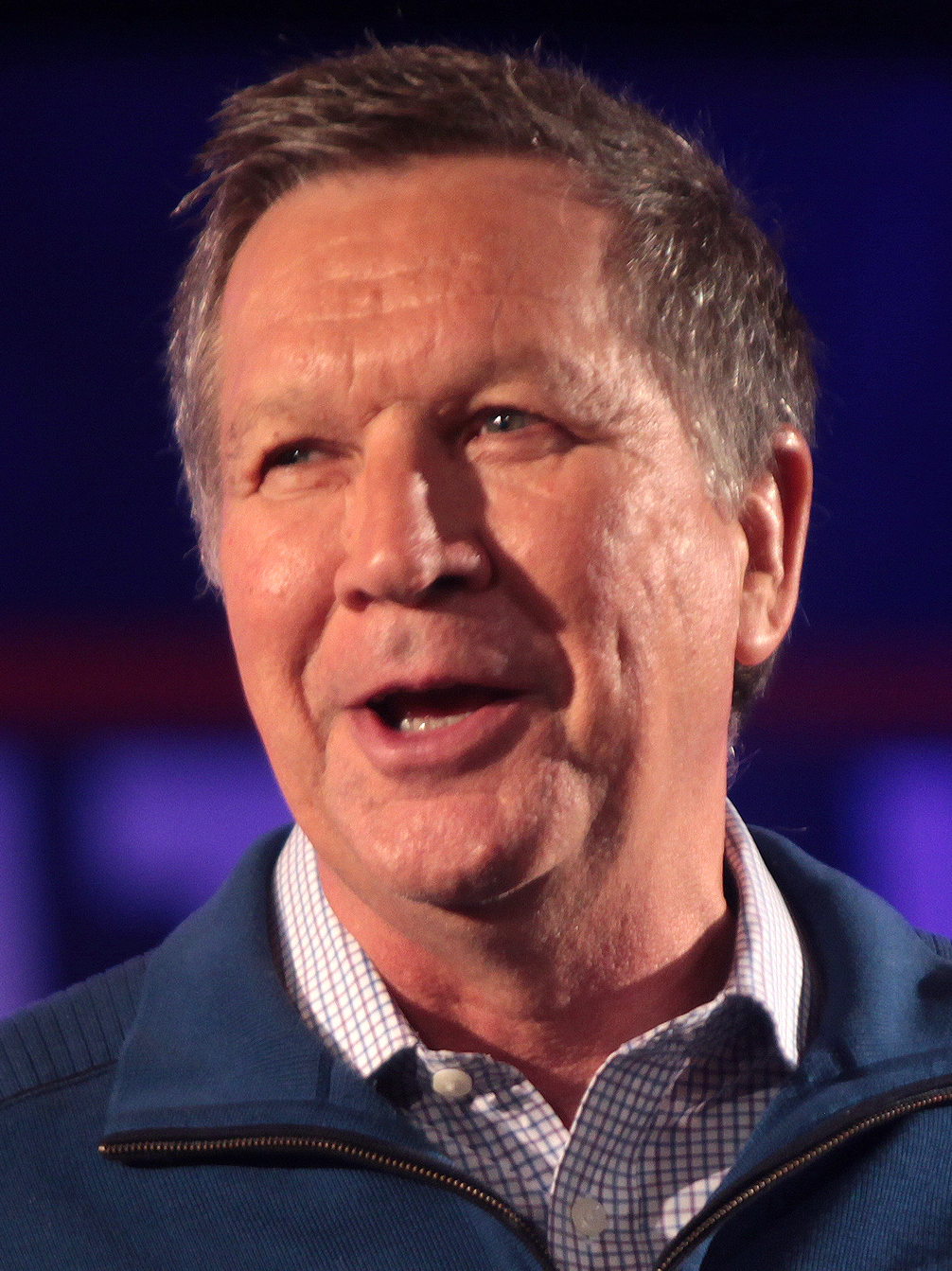
Candidate	Donald Trump	Ted Cruz (withdrawn)	John Kasich (withdrawn)
Home state	New York	Texas	Ohio
Delegate count	29	0	0
Popular vote	44,867	11,352	10,660
Percentage	67.09%	16.97%	15.94%
Election results by county.
Donald Trump
50–60%
60–70%
70–80%
80–90%

The 2016 South Dakota Republican presidential primary was held on June 7 in the U.S. state of South Dakota as one of the Republican Party's primaries ahead of the 2016 presidential election.

The Republican Party's primaries in California, Montana, New Jersey and New Mexico were held the same day. The Democratic primaries in the same five states happened concurrently, including the South Dakota Democratic primary.

== Results ==
South Dakota Republican primary, June 7, 2016
Candidate	Votes	Percentage	Actual delegate count		
Candidate	Votes	Percentage	Bound	Unbound	Total
Donald Trump	44,867	67.09%	29	0	29
Ted Cruz (withdrawn)	11,352	16.97%	0	0	0
John Kasich (withdrawn)	10,660	15.94%	0	0	0
Unprojected delegates:			0	0	0
Total:	66,879	100.00%	29	0	29
Source: The Green Papers

=== Results by county ===
County	Trump		Cruz		Kasich	
County	Votes	Percentage	Votes	Percentage	Votes	Percentage
Aurora	136	63.85%	50	23.47%	27	12.68%
Beadle	454	64.67%	140	19.94%	108	15.38%
Bennett	179	75.21%	30	12.61%	29	12.18%
Bon Homme	343	67.52%	94	18.50%	71	13.98%
Brookings	915	56.87%	319	19.83%	375	23.31%
Brown	1,407	64.69%	397	18.25%	371	17.06%
Brule	245	67.31%	61	16.76%	58	15.93%
Buffalo	37	77.08%	6	12.50%	5	10.42%
Butte	1,074	71.08%	246	16.28%	191	12.64%
Campbell	355	78.89%	52	11.56%	43	9.56%
Charles Mix	404	70.26%	113	19.65%	58	10.09%
Clark	179	63.48%	50	17.73%	53	18.79%
Clay	320	56.64%	102	18.05%	143	25.31%
Codington	1473	67.26%	336	15.34%	381	17.40%
Corson	126	70.79%	37	20.79%	15	8.43%
Custer	1,068	71.73%	226	15.18%	195	13.10%
Davison	808	68.19%	163	13.76%	214	18.06%
Day	249	72.59%	48	13.99%	46	13.41%
Deuel	141	54.23%	59	22.69%	60	23.08%
Dewey	178	76.72%	32	13.79%	22	9.48%
Douglas	262	63.59%	82	19.90%	68	16.50%
Edmunds	426	76.21%	75	13.42%	58	10.38%
Fall River	923	70.89%	211	16.21%	168	12.90%
Faulk	216	73.22%	53	17.97%	26	8.81%
Grant	850	68.05%	188	15.05%	211	16.89%
Gregory	341	77.15%	60	13.57%	41	9.28%
Haakon	397	80.36%	58	11.74%	39	7.89%
Hamlin	489	60.82%%	196	24.38%	119	14.80%
Hand	385	69.37%	93	16.76%	77	13.87%
Hanson	305	74.21%	63	15.33%	43	10.46%
Harding	298	77.40%	56	14.55%	31	8.05%
Hughes	1606	62.69%	355	13.86%	601	23.46%
Hutchinson	622	64.39%	194	20.08%	150	15.53%
Hyde	96	72.73%	21	15.91%	15	11.36%
Jackson	153	72.51%	26	12.32%	32	15.17%
Jerauld	90	59.60%	31	20.53%	30	19.87%
Jones	175	74.15%	33	13.98%	28	11.86%
Kingsbury	421	65.99%	100	15.67%	117	18.34%
Lake	619	65.43%	156	16.49%	171	18.08%
Lawrence	1,801	68.58%	372	14.17%	453	17.25%
Lincoln	1,760	61.32%	587	20.45%	523	18.22%
Lyman	432	74.48%	73	12.59%	75	12.93%
Marshall	163	61.51%	42	15.85%	60	22.64%
McCook	320	63.87%	101	20.16%	80	15.97%
McPherson	340	67.33%	90	17.82%	75	14.85%
Meade	2,205	70.47%	498	15.92%	426	13.61%
Mellette	87	81.31%	8	7.48%	12	11.21%
Miner	98	64.05%	29	18.95%	26	16.99%
Minnehaha	5,206	61.21%	1,701	20.00%	1,598	18.79%
Moody	196	61.25%	72	22.50%	52	16.25%
Oglala Lakota	48	63.16%	11	14.47%	17	22.37%
Pennington	8,162	68.64%	1,929	16.22%	1,800	15.14%
Perkins	441	72.18%	108	17.68%	62	10.15%
Potter	579	76.59%	108	14.29%	69	9.13%
Roberts	286	71.50%	61	15.25%	53	13.25%
Sanborn	122	73.49%	28	16.87%	16	9.64%
Spink	302	67.56%	82	18.34%	63	14.09%
Stanley	352	73.33%	45	9.38%	83	17.29%
Sully	133	66.83%	43	21.61%	23	11.56%
Todd	90	52.94%	54	31.76%	26	15.29%
Tripp	452	77.80%	74	12.74%	55	9.47%
Turner	384	67.37%	110	19.30%	76	13.33%
Union	644	68.15%	161	17.04%	140	14.81%
Walworth	774	75.29%	142	13.81%	112	10.89%
Yankton	646	63.58%	186	18.31%	184	18.11%
Ziebach	79	68.70%	25	21.74%	11	9.57%
Total	44,867	67.09%	11,352	16.97%	10,660	15.94%

== See also ==
- 2016 South Dakota Democratic presidential primary
