= National Register of Historic Places listings in Bennett County, South Dakota =

Location of Bennett County in South Dakota

This is a list of the National Register of Historic Places listings in Bennett County, South Dakota.

This is intended to be a complete list of the properties on the National Register of Historic Places in Bennett County, South Dakota, United States. The locations of National Register properties for which the latitude and longitude coordinates are included below, may be seen in a map.

There is 1 property listed on the National Register in the county.

This National Park Service list is complete through NPS recent listings posted May 30, 2025.

== Current listings ==
| | Name on the Register | Image | Date listed | Location | City or town | Description |
|---|---|---|---|---|---|---|
| 1 | Inland Theater | Inland Theater | July 30, 2013 (#13000570) | 306 Main St; 43°10′31″N 101°44′08″W | Martin | Art Deco theater |

== See also ==
- National Register of Historic Places listings in South Dakota
