= Tuthill, South Dakota =

Tuthill
- Unincorporated community
- Location within the state of South Dakota Tuthill (the United States)
- Coordinates: 43°09′21″N 101°29′38″W
- Country: United States
- State: South Dakota
- County: Bennett
- Time zone: UTC-6 (Central (CST))
  - Summer (DST): UTC-5 (CDT)
- ZIP codes: 57574
- GNIS feature ID: 1261150

Tuthill is an unincorporated community in Bennett County, South Dakota, United States. Tuthill has been assigned the ZIP code of 57574.

Tuthill was laid out in 1920 by J. B. Tuthill, and named for him.

== Demographics ==
Tuthill is not tracked by the United States Census Bureau.

== Education ==
The Bennett County School District serves all of Bennett County.
