= Black Eyes, South Dakota =

Black Eyes
- Unincorporated community
- Location within the state of South Dakota Black Eyes (the United States)
- Coordinates: 43°15′42″N 101°41′50″W
- Country: United States
- State: South Dakota
- County: Bennett
- Elevation: 3,018 ft (920 m)
- Time zone: UTC-7 (Mountain (MST))
  - Summer (DST): UTC-6 (MDT)
- GNIS feature ID: 1266662

Black Eyes is an unincorporated community in Bennett County, South Dakota, United States.
