= Inland Theater =

- U.S. National Register of Historic Places
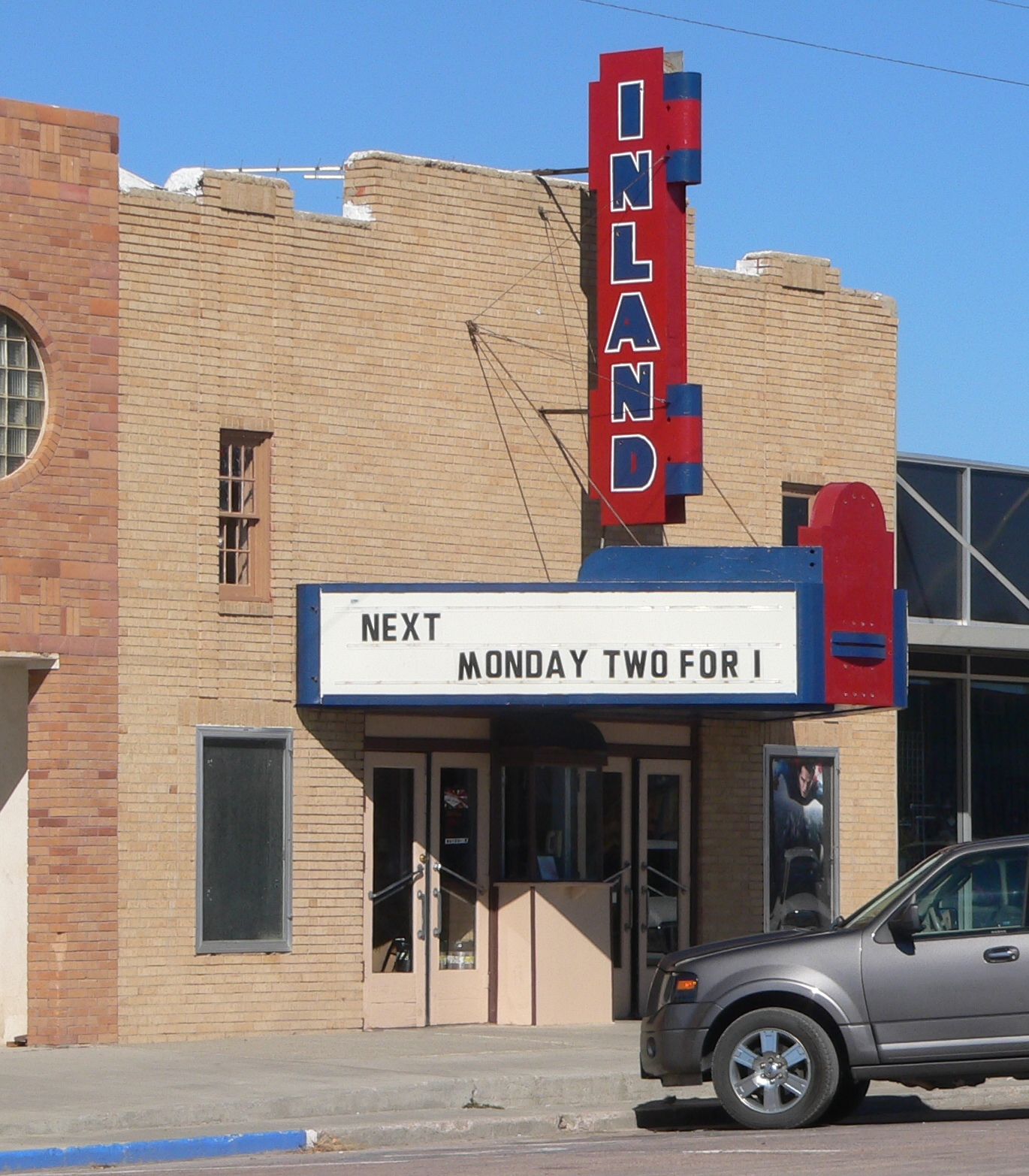

- Location within South Dakota Location within the United States
- Location: 306 Main St, Martin, South Dakota
- Coordinates: 43°10′31″N 101°44′08″W
- Area: less than one acre
- Built: 1939-1940
- Architectural style: Art Deco
- NRHP reference No.: 13000570
- Added to NRHP: July 30, 2013

The Inland Theater is a historic theater located in Martin, Bennett County, South Dakota, United States. The Inland Theater is the second theater constructed in the city of Martin. The first theater, the Allen Theater, was built in 1925 and 1926 and was one of the first theaters in western South Dakota to show talkie movies. The Allen Theater was destroyed by a tornado in 1939, and soon thereafter, construction of the Inland Theater began in September 1939. The Inland theater was constructed in the Art Deco style of architecture and held 300 people. The theater opened on January 14, 1940 and continued until 1991, when it was put up for sale. In 1997 the Inland Theater was purchased and reopened.

The Inland theater was listed on the National Register of Historic Places on July 30, 2013.

== See also ==
- National Register of Historic Places listings in Bennett County, South Dakota
