= Bad Wound, South Dakota =

Unincorporated community in South Dakota, U.S.

Coordinates: 43°18′01″N 101°45′36″W

Bad Wound is an unincorporated community in Bennett County, in the U.S. state of South Dakota.

Bad Wound (Lakota: Tȟaópi Šíča) was the name of an Oglala Lakota chief.
