= Lacreek National Wildlife Refuge =

Protected area in South Dakota, United States

- IUCN category IV (habitat/species management area)
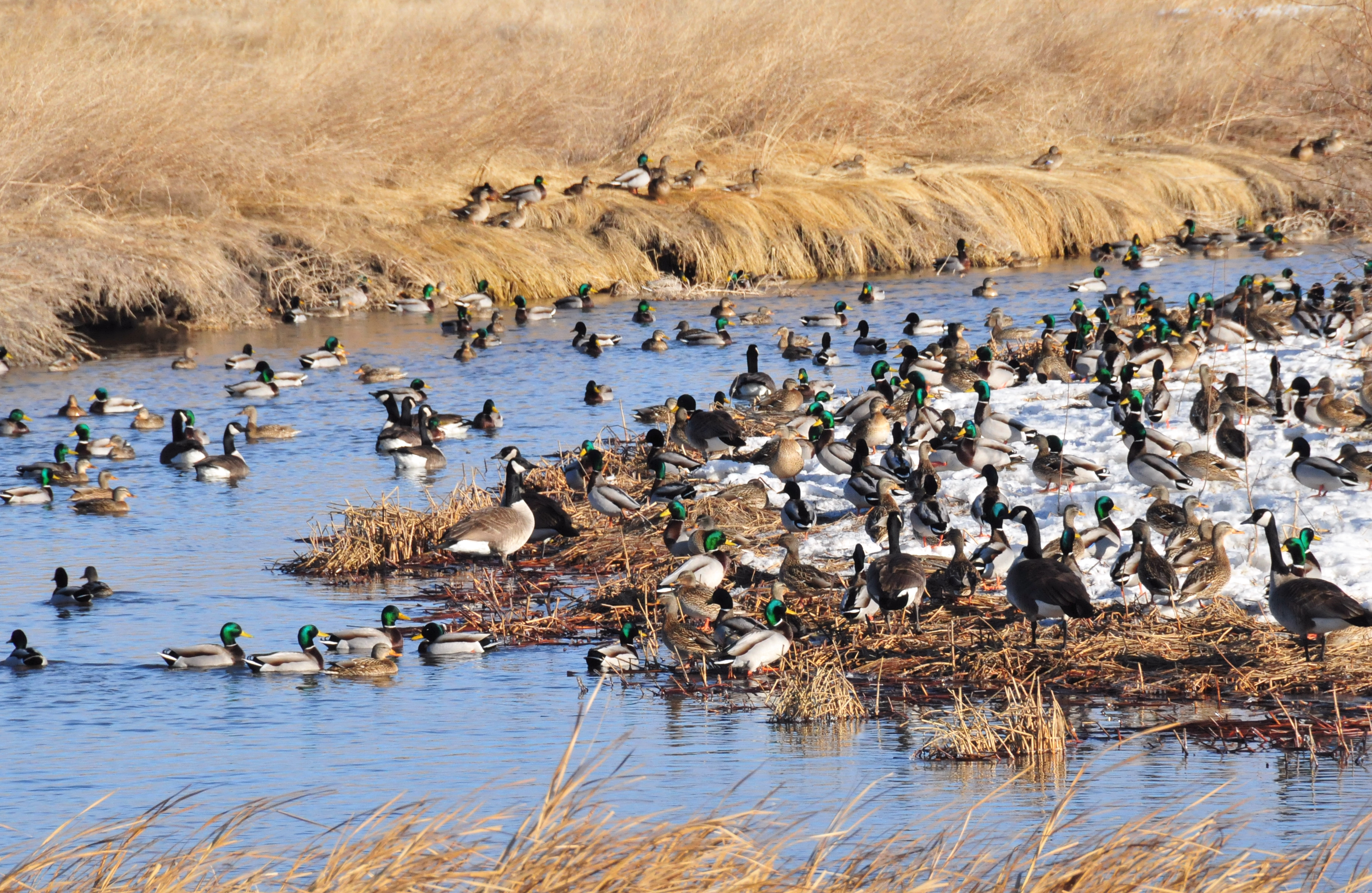

- Location within South Dakota Location within the United States
- Location: Bennett County, South Dakota, United States
- Nearest city: Martin, SD
- Coordinates: 43°5′56″N 101°35′10″W
- Area: 16,570 acres (6,710 ha)
- Established: August 26, 1935
- Governing body: U.S. Fish and Wildlife Service
- Website: Lacreek National Wildlife Refuge

Lacreek National Wildlife Refuge is a National Wildlife Refuge of the United States located in South Dakota. It covers 16,570 acres (67 km^{2}) and is managed by the United States Fish and Wildlife Service.

Early conservation work to protect the area was performed by the Civilian Conservation Corps during the 1930s. A combination of wetlands, meadows and small stands of planted trees in the upland sections provide habitat for a wide variety of species. Much of the refuge has a series of low dikes that help to maintain some areas in a prolonged wetland state, increasing wildlife habitat, especially for migratory bird species. The refuge borders the Nebraska Sandhills, which are a source of water runoff into the early summer.

Since the late 1950s, 281 species of birds have been recorded at the refuge. During the spring and fall migratory periods, as many as 29,000 ducks and 37,000 geese have been observed. About 80 and 100 trumpeter swans spend the winter at the refuge each year. The endangered whooping crane and the bald eagle live in the area. Other raptors such as the red-tailed hawk, Swainson's hawk, northern harrier, American kestrel, great horned owl, and golden eagle can be seen. The introduced ring-necked pheasant is abundant.

Resident mammals include pronghorn, white-tailed deer, mule deer, coyote, and badger.

Waterways in the refuge are habitat for fish such as the yellow perch, northern pike, and many smaller species. They are a food source for many of the local birds.

The refuge allows fishing and hunting in limited areas and in season.

== Bear Butte National Wildlife Refuge ==
Bear Butte National Wildlife refuge is now open to the public. Located in southwestern Meade County near Sturgis, South Dakota, Bear Butte is managed by Lacreek National Wildlife Refuge and South Dakota Game, Fish and Parks. It is located at 44°27′20″N 103°26′45″W.
