= Scenic, South Dakota =

- unincorporated community
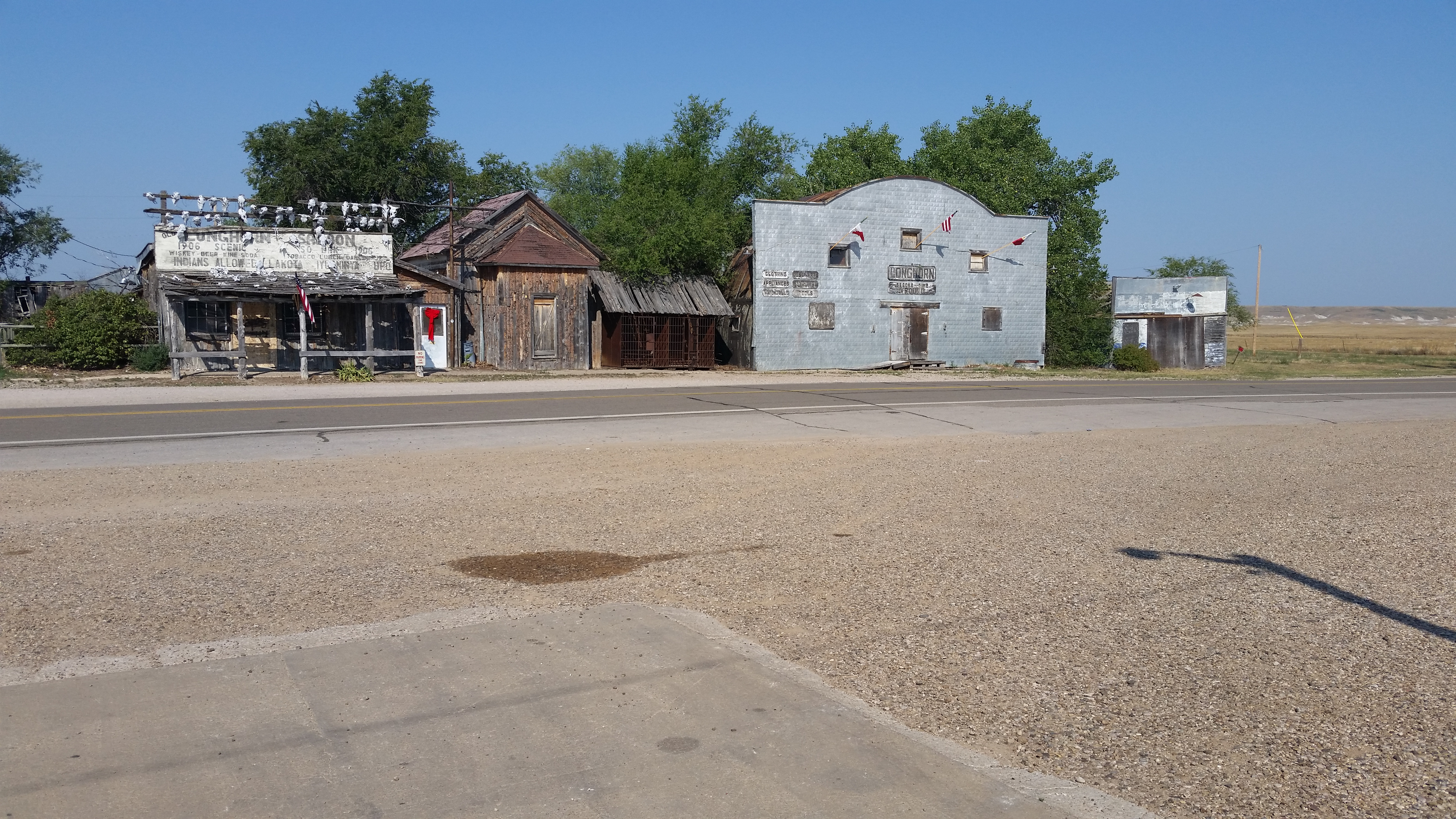

- Location within the state of South Dakota Scenic (the United States)
- Coordinates: 43°46′46.6″N 102°33′13″W
- Country: United States
- State: South Dakota
- County: Pennington

Area
  - Total: 134.2 sq mi (347.6 km^{2})
  - Land: 133.9 sq mi (346.9 km^{2})
  - Water: 0.27 sq mi (0.7 km^{2})
- Elevation: 2,900 ft (884 m)

Population (2011)
  - Total: 10
  - Density: 0.78/sq mi (0.3/km^{2})
- Time zone: UTC-7 (Mountain (MST))
  - Summer (DST): UTC-6 (MDT)
- ZIP code: 57780
- Area code: 605
- FIPS code: 46-57820
- GNIS feature ID: 1268730

Scenic is an unincorporated community in Pennington County, South Dakota, United States. It is located within Scenic Township, which had a 2010 census population of 58 inhabitants. The community is located adjacent to the Badlands National Park, about 50 miles (80 km) southeast of Rapid City, or about one hour by car, along Highway 44.

== History ==
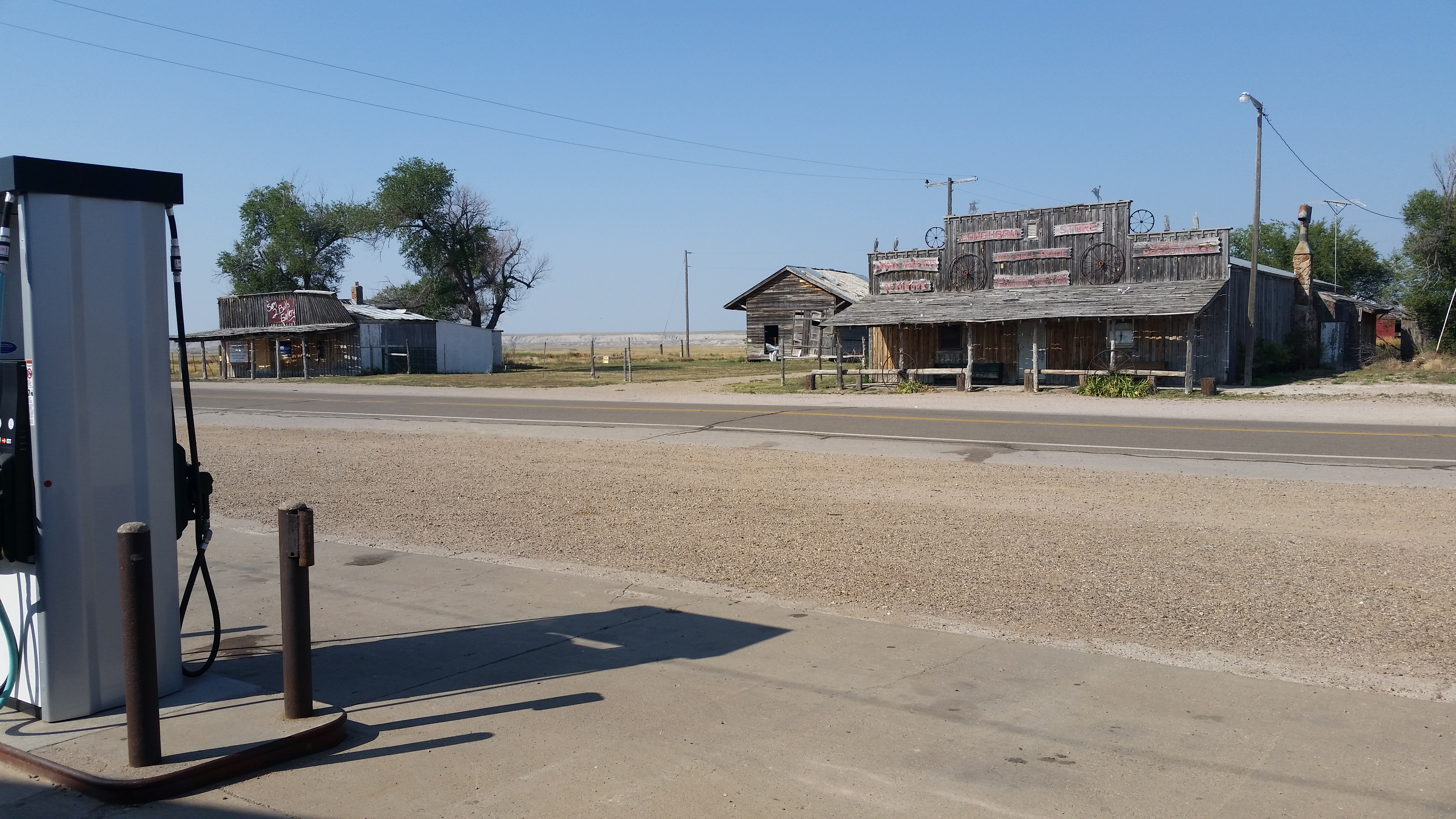
A view of the now defunct Longhorn Store in 2017.

The community was so named for the "scenic" setting of the town site.

As an economic decline hit the town in the 21st century, local businesswoman Twila Merrill acquired more and more of the town property until she owned most of it.

In July 2011, the 12-acre (4.9 ha) town and surrounding area—about 46 acres (19 ha) total—was listed for sale at $799,000. The sale included the post office (ZIP code 57780), Longhorn Saloon, a dance hall, bunkhouse, museum, and two stores. It also included a train depot that is on an abandoned line that was part of the Chicago, Milwaukee, St. Paul and Pacific Railroad and is the subject of a 104-mile (167 km) rails-to-trail project between Rapid City and Kadoka.

In August 2011, the Iglesia ni Cristo (INC, English: Church of Christ), an independent, nontrinitarian Christian denomination based in the Philippines, bought the property for nearly $800,000, Pennington County records show. The church never disclosed why it acquired the property. In 2014, Daniel Simmons-Ritchie of the Rapid City Journal wrote that the INC "has done little with the town since its purchase."

In April 2015, an INC minister moved to the area and soon afterwards began leading services for 10–15 congregants who live near Scenic.

== See also ==
- Swett, South Dakota, another town put up for sale
- Johnsonville Village, Connecticut, an abandoned community also purchased by the Iglesia ni Cristo
