= 2016 New Jersey Democratic presidential primary =

- June 7, 2016

Candidate	Hillary Clinton	Bernie Sanders
Home state	New York	Vermont
Delegate count	79	47
Popular vote	566,247	328,058
Percentage	63.32%	36.68%
Election results by county.
Clinton
50 – 60%
60 – 70%
70 - 80%
Sanders
50 – 60%

The 2016 New Jersey Democratic presidential primary was held on June 7 in the U.S. state of New Jersey as one of the Democratic Party's primaries ahead of the 2016 presidential election.

The Democratic Party's primaries in California, Montana, New Mexico and South Dakota were held the same day, as were Republican primaries in the same five states, including their own New Jersey primary. Additionally, the Democratic Party held North Dakota caucuses the same day.

Clinton had won the state eight years prior and had support from most of the state's Democratic Congressional delegation, including Senator Cory Booker. Feeling confident about her chances in the primary, Clinton cancelled campaign events in the state in favor of delegate-rich California ahead of the primary.

== Opinion polling ==
Poll source	Date	1st	2nd	Other
Official Primary results	June 7, 2016	Hillary Clinton; 63.3%	Bernie Sanders; 36.7%	
CBS/YouGov Margin of error: ± 5.4% Sample size: 586	May 31 – June 3, 2016	Hillary Clinton; 61%	Bernie Sanders; 34%	Others / Undecided; 5%
American Research Group Margin of error: ± -% Sample size: 400	May 31 – June 2, 2016	Hillary Clinton; 60%	Bernie Sanders; 37%	Others / Undecided; 3%
Quinnipiac Margin of error: ± 3.7% Sample size: 696	May 10–16, 2016	Hillary Clinton; 54%	Bernie Sanders; 40%	Others / Undecided; 6%
Monmouth University Margin of error: ± 5.7% Sample size: 301	May 1–3, 2016	Hillary Clinton; 60%	Bernie Sanders; 32%	Others / Undecided; 8%
Rutgers-Eagleton Poll Margin of error: ± 6.3% Sample Size: 292	April 1–8, 2016	Hillary Clinton; 51%	Bernie Sanders; 42%	Others / Undecided; 7%
Rutgers-Eagleton Poll Margin of error: ± 6.2% Sample Size: 304	February 6–15, 2016	Hillary Clinton; 55%	Bernie Sanders; 32%	Others / Undecided; 13%

Polls in 2015

Poll source	Date	1st	2nd	3rd	Other
Rutgers-Eagleton Poll Margin of error: ± ?% Sample Size: 304	November 30 – December 6, 2015	Hillary Clinton; 60%	Bernie Sanders; 19%	Martin O'Malley 1%	Other 3%, Don't know 17%
Farleigh Dickenson University Margin of error: ± 3.9% Sample Size: 830	November 9–15, 2015	Hillary Clinton; 64%	Bernie Sanders; 27%	Martin O'Malley 2%	DK/Refused 3%, Wouldn't Vote 3%, Other 1%
Rutgers-Eagleton Poll Margin of error: ± 5.7% Sample size: 367	October 3–10, 2015	Hillary Clinton; 49%	Bernie Sanders; 19%	Joe Biden; 10%	Other 3%, Don't know 20%
Fairleigh Dickinson University Margin of error: ± 5.5% Sample size: 345	June 15–21, 2015	Hillary Clinton; 63%	Bernie Sanders; 15%	Martin O'Malley; 3%	Lincoln Chafee 0%, Other 1%, Wouldn't vote 3%, DK/Refused 14%
Fairleigh Dickinson University Margin of error: ± 5.5% Sample size: 323	April 13–19, 2015	Hillary Clinton; 62%			Another Democratic candidate 9%, Don't know 27%, Refused 1%
Quinnipiac University Margin of error: ± 4.2% Sample size: 539	April 9–14, 2015	Hillary Clinton; 63%	Elizabeth Warren; 12%	Joe Biden; 10%	Bernie Sanders 3%, Martin O'Malley 1%, Jim Webb 1%, Lincoln Chafee 0%, Other 1%, Wouldn't vote 3%, Don't know 7%
Quinnipiac University Margin of error: ± 4.2% Sample size: 539	April 9–14, 2015	Joe Biden; 36%	Elizabeth Warren; 28%	Bernie Sanders; 6%	Martin O'Malley 3%, Jim Webb 1%, Lincoln Chafee 0%, Other 1%, Wouldn't vote 4%, Don't know 21%
Quinnipiac University Margin of error: ± ? Sample size: ?	January 15–19, 2015	Hillary Clinton; 65%	Elizabeth Warren; 11%	Joe Biden; 7%	Bernie Sanders 3%, Jim Webb 1%, Martin O'Malley 0%, Other 1%, Wouldn't vote 3%, Don't know 11%

Polls in 2014

Poll source	Date	1st	2nd	3rd	Other
Rutgers-Eagleton Margin of error: ± ? Sample size: 280	December 3–10, 2014	Hillary Clinton; 54%	Elizabeth Warren; 6%	Cory Booker; 2%	Joe Biden 1%, Martin O'Malley 1%, Other 3%, Don't know 34%
Rutgers-Eagleton Margin of error: ± ? Sample size: 331	July 28 – August 5, 2014	Hillary Clinton; 59%	Joe Biden; 3%	Elizabeth Warren; 3%	Cory Booker 2%, Other 4%, Don't know 30%

Polls in 2013

Poll source	Date	1st	2nd	3rd	Other
Fairleigh Dickinson University Margin of error: ± 5.3% Sample size: 337	August 21–27, 2013	Hillary Clinton; 63%	Joe Biden; 10%	Andrew Cuomo; 6%	Elizabeth Warren 4%, Other 4%, Undecided 13%
Kean University Margin of error: ± ?% Sample size: 420	April 25–29, 2013	Hillary Clinton; 67%	Joe Biden; 13%	Andrew Cuomo; 8%	Martin O'Malley 2%, Other 4%, Undecided 6%

== Results ==
New Jersey Democratic primary, June 7, 2016
Candidate	Popular vote		Estimated delegates		
Candidate	Count	Percentage	Pledged	Unpledged	Total
Hillary Clinton	566,247	63.32%	79	12	91
Bernie Sanders	328,058	36.68%	47	2	49
Uncommitted	—N/a		0	0	0
Total	894,305	100%	126	16	142

=== Results by county ===
Hillary Clinton won every county except for Sussex and Warren.

County	Clinton	%	Sanders	%	Totals	Turnout	Margin
Atlantic	13,556	60.62%	8,805	39.38%	22,361		
Bergen	57,319	63.47%	32,994	36.53%	90,313		
Burlington	33,166	63.02%	19,461	36.98%	52,627		
Camden	44,400	62.27%	26,905	37.73%	71,305		
Cape May	3,969	54.83%	3,269	45.17%	7,238		
Cumberland	6,894	64.18%	3,847	35.82%	10,741		
Essex	77,836	73.07%	28,679	26.93%	105,915		
Gloucester	18,011	56.12%	14,082	43.88%	32,093		
Hudson	50,875	66.34%	25,815	33.66%	76,690		
Hunterdon	5,794	51.93%	5,362	48.07%	11,156		
Mercer	29,650	66.00%	15,276	34.00%	44,926		
Middlesex	48,202	61.01%	30,800	38.99%	79,002		
Monmouth	30,967	58.07%	22,360	41.93%	53,327		
Morris	24,285	58.32%	17,355	41.68%	41,640		
Ocean	19,663	54.49%	16,424	45.51%	36,087		
Passaic	29,997	67.63%	14,356	32.37%	44,353		
Salem	2,821	56.46%	2,175	43.54%	4,996		
Somerset	19,838	61.56%	12,385	38.44%	32,223		
Sussex	3,986	42.91%	5,303	57.09%	9,289		
Union	41,605	68.82%	18,853	31.18%	60,458		
Warren	3,413	49.00%	3,552	51.00%	6,965		
Total	566,247	63.32%	328,058	36.68%	894,305		

== Analysis ==
With its coalition of African Americans, Hispanic/Latinos, and college-educated, affluent Caucasian progressive/liberal professionals, New Jersey was seen as a state Clinton would win in the final batch of primaries on June 7. Having won the state eight years earlier against Barack Obama, Clinton managed a 26-point-routing against Bernie Sanders in 2016 despite the Sanders campaign's efforts in the state. She carried all counties in New Jersey but two, winning large victories in the cities of Newark, Trenton, and Atlantic City.
