= Allen, South Dakota =

Allen, South Dakota Wagmíza Wakpála
- Census-designated place
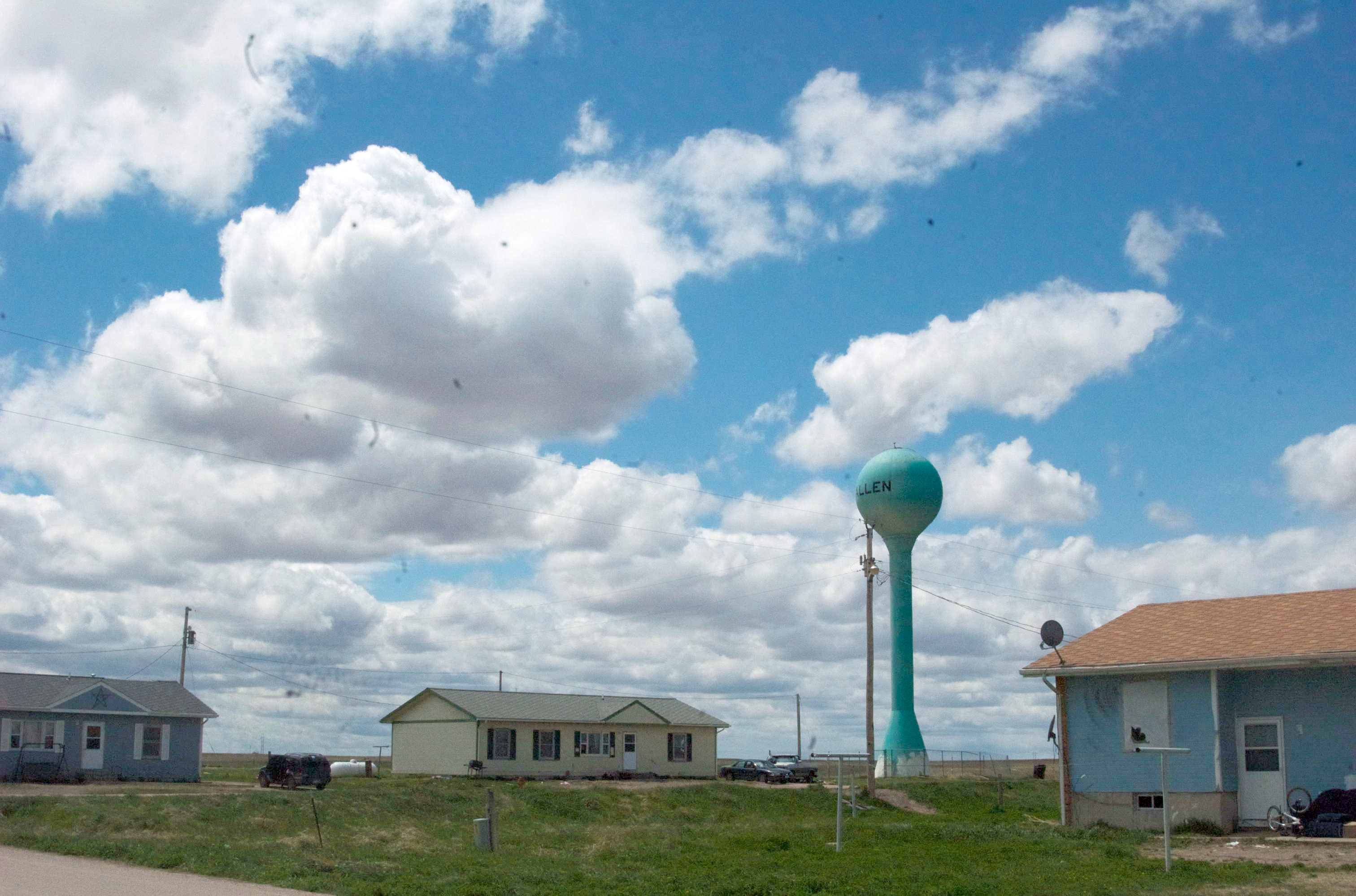
- View of the Village of Allen

- Location in Bennett County and the state of South Dakota
- Coordinates: 43°16′45″N 101°55′35″W
- Country: United States
- state: South Dakota
- Counties: Bennett
- Township: Allen

Area
  - Total: 3.9 sq mi (10 km^{2})
  - Land: 3.9 sq mi (10 km^{2})
  - Water: 0 sq mi (0 km^{2})
- Elevation: 3,297 ft (1,005 m)

Population (2020)
  - Total: 460
  - Density: 107.7/sq mi (41.6/km^{2})
- Time zone: UTC-7 (Mountain (MST))
  - Summer (DST): UTC-6 (MDT)
- ZIP code: 57714
- GNIS feature ID: 2393315

Allen (Lakota: Wagmíza Wakpála) is a census-designated place on the Pine Ridge Indian Reservation in Bennett County, South Dakota, United States, that was named for the Allen Township (civil township), which it encompasses. As of the 2020 census, the CDP had a population of 460. It is one of two places which are closest to the North American continental pole of inaccessibility.

== History ==
The CDP is named for the Allen Township, which in turn was named for Charles W. Allen, the town's first merchant.

== Geography ==
According to the United States Census Bureau, the CDP has a total area of 3.9 square miles (10 km^{2}), all land.

Allen has been assigned the ZIP code 57714 throughout the CDP.

In North America, the continental pole of inaccessibility is between Kyle and Allen, located 1,650 km (1,030 mi) from the nearest coastline at 43.36°N 101.97°W.

== Demographics ==
Historical population
Census	Pop.	Note	%±
2000	419		—
2010	420		0.2%
2020	460		9.5%
U.S. Decennial Census

=== 2020 ===
As of the census of 2020, there were 460 people and 84 households in the CDP. The population density was 117.9 people/sq mi (305 people/km^{2}). There were 87 housing units (84 occupied) at an average density of 22.2 per sq mi (57 per km^{2}). The racial makeup of the CDP was 0.87% White, 98.91% Native American, and 0.22% from two or more races. Hispanic or Latino of any race were 1.52% of the population.

=== 2010 ===
As of the census of 2010, there were 420 people living in the CDP.

=== 2000 ===
As of the census of 2000, there were 419 people, 80 households, and 70 families living in the CDP. The population density was 106.8 people/sq mi (277 people/km^{2}). There were 87 housing units at an average density of 22.2 per sq mi (57 per km^{2}). The racial makeup of the CDP was 4.30% White, 94.03% Native American, and 1.67% from two or more races. Hispanic or Latino of any race were 1.43% of the population.

There were 80 households, out of which 62.5% had children under the age of 18 living with them, 21.3% were married couples living together, 50.0% had a female householder with no husband present, and 12.5% were non-families. 10.0% of all households were made up of individuals, and 1.3% had someone living alone who was 65 years of age or older. The average household size was 5.24 and the average family size was 5.51.

In the CDP, the population was spread out, with 50.4% under the age of 18, 13.8% from 18 to 24, 21.5% from 25 to 44, 12.2% from 45 to 64, and 2.1% who were 65 years of age or older. The median age was 18 years. For every 100 females, there were 99.5 males. For every 100 females age 18 and over, there were 89.1 males.

The median income for a household in the CDP was $7,578, and the median income for a family was $3,819. Males had a median income of $0 versus $12,188 for females. The per capita income for the CDP was $1,539. About 95.9% of families and 96.1% of the population were below the poverty line, including 97.1% of those under age 18 and 100.0% of those age 65 or over.

== Education ==
The Bureau of Indian Education (BIE) is affiliated with the American Horse School, a K-8 school operated by a tribal group.

It was established in 1931 as the consolidation of Day School #20 and Day School #21, with the former buildings of those two schools becoming teacher housing. As of 2024, its enrollment was 223. In 2015, the Minneapolis Star-Tribune editorial board wrote that American Horse had poor insulation, had too many students relative to building capacity, has tile flooring in poor repair and using asbestos, and "lacks the electrical and communications infrastructure needed to support the technology used in modern education."

The town, like other areas in the county, is within Bennett County School District 03-1.

The Allen Youth Center, which opened in 2014, provides tutoring, recreation, and food distribution. It has been powered with solar panels since 2018.

== See also ==
- List of census-designated places in South Dakota
