= Swett, South Dakota =

- Unincorporated community
- Location within the state of South Dakota Swett (the United States)
- Coordinates: 43°10′19″N 101°57′06″W
- Country: United States
- State: South Dakota
- County: Bennett
- Elevation: 3,343 ft (1,019 m)

Population (2010)
  - Total: 2
- Time zone: UTC-7 (MST)
  - Summer (DST): UTC-6 (MDT)
- Area code: 605
- FIPS code: 46-62660
- GNIS ID: 1258479

Swett is an unincorporated former town of Bennett County, South Dakota, United States. It was put up for sale as a ghost town in June 2014 and as of November 2016 had not found a buyer.

The town, on U.S. Highway 18 approximately two hours southeast of Rapid City, covers 6.16 acres (2.49 ha) of land. Its buildings include a gas station, museum, a bar and a store. Daniel Simmons-Ritchie of the Rapid City Journal describes the buildings as "a few ramshackle buildings".

== History ==
Swett was founded in 1931. In 1932 a post office was started in the local grocery store, which was owned by a farmer named Swett. In the 1940s there were 40 residents. At the time the community included a post office, a grocery store, and several houses. The post office was closed in 1945, leaving the community to be known for the saloon. Later the saloon was converted into a home after the building of the current Swett Tavern.

As time passed, the number of people owning property decreased. Eventually one person owned all of the properties and land in the community. The property was passed from person to person. In 1998 Lance Benson acquired the town. Benson divorced a previous wife, and she received the town after he signed away the property. In 2012 Benson re-acquired the town. In June 2014 Benson offered to sell the town for $399,000. The hamlet's sale became international news. In October 2015, the bank in Gordon, Nebraska, holding the mortgage foreclosed on the hamlet property. The selling price was reduced to $250,000 in 2015. The three mobile homes were removed in a general clean up of the property.

== Economy ==
Simmons-Ritchie described the Swett Tavern bar as the "beating heart" of the community which serves as the "de facto gathering place for a small army of local cowboys and wheatgrowers." Simmons stated that the bar is "the only watering hole in a 2-mile radius". Simmons-Ritchie stated that the bar was known for having "a reputation for attracting rough customers" and fights but that the reputation of the bar improved after Benson acquired it. Simmons-Ritchie added that the bar "has always maintained a distinctly local veneer; a place where cowboy hats are de rigueur and rusted wagon wheels adorn the front facade."

== Census designated place ==
Although it is not part of a formal CDP, Swett is included by the United States Census Bureau in its statistical Unorganized Territory of West Bennett.

== See also ==
- Scenic, South Dakota (town put up for sale and sold)
