= 2016 New Mexico Democratic presidential primary =

- June 7, 2016

| Candidate | Hillary Clinton | Bernie Sanders |
| Home state | New York | Vermont |
| Delegate count | 18 | 16 |
| Popular vote | 111,334 | 104,741 |
| Percentage | 51.53% | 48.47% |
County results
Clinton
50–60%
60–70%
Sanders
50–60%
60–70%

The 2016 New Mexico Democratic presidential primary was held on June 7 in the U.S. state of New Mexico as one of the Democratic Party's primaries ahead of the 2016 presidential election.

The Democratic Party's primaries in California, Montana, New Jersey and South Dakota were scheduled to be held the same day, as were the Republican primaries in the same five states, including their own New Mexico primary. Additionally, the Democratic Party held the North Dakota caucuses the same day.

== Opinion polling ==
| Poll source | Date | 1st | 2nd | Other |
|---|---|---|---|---|
| Official Primary results | June 7, 2016 | Hillary Clinton; 51.5% | Bernie Sanders; 48.5% | |
| BWD Global Margin of error: ± 2.5% Sample size: 1,455 | May 25–26, 2016 | Hillary Clinton; 53% | Bernie Sanders; 28% | Others / Undecided; 19% |
| Albuquerque Journal Margin of error: ± 4.9% Sample size: 401 | February 23–25, 2016 | Hillary Clinton; 47% | Bernie Sanders; 33% | Others / Undecided; 20% |

== Results ==
New Mexico Democratic primary, June 7, 2016
| Candidate | Popular vote | | Estimated delegates | | |
| Candidate | Count | Percentage | Pledged | Unpledged | Total |
|---|---|---|---|---|---|
| Hillary Clinton | 111,334 | 51.53% | 18 | 9 | 27 |
| Bernie Sanders | 104,741 | 48.47% | 16 | 0 | 16 |
| Uncommitted | —N/a | | 0 | 0 | 0 |
| Total | 216,075 | 100% | 34 | 9 | 43 |

=== Results by county ===
| County | Clinton | Votes | Sanders | Votes |
|---|---|---|---|---|
| Bernalillo | 49.1% | 36,937 | 50.9% | 38,247 |
| Catron | 38.6% | 115 | 61.4% | 183 |
| Chaves | 56.6% | 1,238 | 43.4% | 950 |
| Cibola | 51.5% | 1,586 | 48.5% | 1,494 |
| Colfax | 56.2% | 949 | 43.8% | 740 |
| Curry | 46.7% | 672 | 53.3% | 768 |
| De Baca | 45.7% | 96 | 54.3% | 114 |
| Doña Ana | 55.7% | 9,097 | 44.3% | 7,243 |
| Eddy | 53.9% | 1,566 | 46.1% | 1,340 |
| Grant | 50.1% | 2,272 | 49.9% | 2,267 |
| Guadalupe | 54.7% | 399 | 45.3% | 330 |
| Harding | 62.0% | 75 | 38.0% | 46 |
| Hidalgo | 61.5% | 515 | 38.5% | 323 |
| Lea | 52.0% | 705 | 48.0% | 651 |
| Lincoln | 49.4% | 515 | 50.6% | 527 |
| Los Alamos | 50.4% | 1,424 | 49.4% | 1,404 |
| Luna | 56.2% | 917 | 43.8% | 714 |
| McKinley | 59.1% | 4,761 | 40.9% | 3,299 |
| Mora | 62.1% | 986 | 37.9% | 603 |
| Otero | 52.7% | 1,324 | 47.3% | 1,190 |
| Quay | 51.5% | 473 | 48.5% | 445 |
| Rio Arriba | 60.2% | 4,915 | 39.8% | 3,252 |
| Roosevelt | 41.8% | 281 | 58.2% | 392 |
| Sandoval | 51.7% | 7,448 | 48.3% | 6,958 |
| San Juan | 52.5% | 3,019 | 47.5% | 2,735 |
| San Miguel | 59.4% | 3,418 | 40.6% | 2,341 |
| Santa Fe | 50.6% | 16,087 | 49.4% | 15,703 |
| Sierra | 43.0% | 400 | 57.0% | 530 |
| Socorro | 50.6% | 1,050 | 49.4% | 1,024 |
| Taos | 43.2% | 3,285 | 56.8% | 4,325 |
| Torrance | 49.9% | 649 | 50.1% | 651 |
| Union | 44.8% | 154 | 55.2% | 190 |
| Valencia | 52.1% | 3,123 | 48.0% | 2,877 |
| Total | 51.53% | 111,334 | 48.47% | 104,741 |

== Analysis ==
After being projected to win the state by double digits, Clinton managed a 3-point-win in New Mexico, thanks to support from majority non-white areas such as Doña Ana County which contains the city of Las Cruces and is majority Hispanic/Latino, as well as McKinley and San Juan which are largely Native American and include parts of the Navajo Nation and the Apache Nation. Clinton won by a narrow margin in Santa Fe. Sanders, meanwhile, won by a larger margin in Albuquerque, the state's largest city, and thus held Clinton to a very narrow margin statewide.
