= 2016 California Democratic presidential primary =

- June 7, 2016

546 delegates to the Democratic National Convention (475 pledged, 71 unpledged) The number of pledged delegates received is determined by the popular vote

Candidate	Hillary Clinton	Bernie Sanders
Home state	New York	Vermont
Delegate count	254	221
Popular vote	2,745,302	2,381,722
Percentage	53.07%	46.04%
Election results by county.
Clinton
40 – 50%
50 – 60%
60 – 70%
Sanders
40 – 50%
50 – 60%
60 – 70%
70 – 80%

The 2016 California Democratic presidential primary was held on June 7 in the U.S. state of California as one of the Democratic Party's primaries ahead of the 2016 presidential election.

The Democratic Party's primaries in Montana, New Jersey, New Mexico and South Dakota were held the same day, as were Republican primaries in the same five states. Additionally, the Democratic Party held North Dakota caucuses the same day.

== Opinion polling ==
Poll source	Date	1st	2nd	Other
	June 7, 2016	Hillary Clinton; 53.1%	Bernie Sanders; 46.0%	Others; 0.9%
CBS News/YouGov Margin of error: ±5.0% Sample size: 674	May 31-June 3, 2016	Hillary Clinton; 49%	Bernie Sanders; 47%	Others / Undecided 4%
American Research Group Margin of error: ± 5% Sample size: 400	May 31 – June 2, 2016	Hillary Clinton; 48%	Bernie Sanders; 47%	Others / Undecided; 5%
NBC/WSJ/Marist Margin of error: ±4.2% Sample size: 557	May 29–31, 2016	Hillary Clinton; 49%	Bernie Sanders; 47%	Others / Undecided 4%
Field Margin of error: ±4.1% Sample size: 571	May 26–31, 2016	Hillary Clinton; 45%	Bernie Sanders; 43%	Others / Undecided 12%
USC Dornsife/Los Angeles Times Margin of error: ± 2.9% Sample size: 1,500	May 19–31, 2016	Hillary Clinton; 49%	Bernie Sanders; 39%	Others / Undecided; 13%
SurveyUSA Margin of error: ±% Sample size: 803	May 19–22, 2016	Hillary Clinton; 57%	Bernie Sanders; 39%	Undecided 4%
PPIC Margin of error: ±5.7% Sample size: 552	May 13–22, 2016	Hillary Clinton; 46%	Bernie Sanders; 44%	Undecided 10%
Hoover Institution State Poll Margin of error: ±3.47% Sample size: 1,700	May 4–16, 2016	Hillary Clinton; 51%	Bernie Sanders; 38%	Others / Undecided; 11%
Sextant (D)/Capitol Weekly Margin of error: ±2.3% Sample size: 1,617	April 28-May 1, 2016	Hillary Clinton; 49%	Bernie Sanders; 39%	Others / Undecided; 12%
SurveyUSA/KABC/SCNG Margin of error: ± % Sample size: 826	April 27–30, 2016	Hillary Clinton; 57%	Bernie Sanders; 38%	Others / Undecided; 6%
FOX News Margin of error: ± 4% Sample size: 623	April 18–21, 2016	Hillary Clinton; 48%	Bernie Sanders; 46%	Others / Undecided; 6%
CBS News/YouGov Margin of error: ± 4.5% Sample size: 1,124	April 13–15, 2016	Hillary Clinton; 52%	Bernie Sanders; 40%	Others / Undecided; 8%
Gravis Marketing Margin of error: ± 3.4% Sample size: 846	April 7–10, 2016	Hillary Clinton; 47%	Bernie Sanders; 41%	Others / Undecided; 12%
Field Margin of error: ± 4.0% Sample size: 584	March 24 - April 4, 2016	Hillary Clinton; 47%	Bernie Sanders; 41%	Others / Undecided; 12%
SurveyUSA Margin of error: ± 3.6% Sample size: 767	March 30 - April 3, 2016	Hillary Clinton; 53%	Bernie Sanders; 39%	Others / Undecided; 8%
USC Dornsife/Los Angeles Times Margin of error: ± 3.7% Sample size: 832	March 16–23, 2016	Hillary Clinton; 47%	Bernie Sanders; 36%	Others / Undecided; 17%
PPIC Margin of error: ± 6.2% Sample size: 529	March 6–15, 2016	Hillary Clinton; 48%	Bernie Sanders; 41%	Others / Undecided; 11%
Field Poll Margin of error: ± 5.6% Sample Size: 329	January 6, 2016	Hillary Clinton; 46%	Bernie Sanders; 35%	Martin O'Malley 1% Undecided 18%

Polls in 2015

Poll source	Date	1st	2nd	Other
Field Poll Margin of error: ± 5.0% Sample size: 391	September 17 – October 4, 2015	Hillary Clinton; 47%	Bernie Sanders; 35%	Martin O'Malley 1% Jim Webb 1% Lincoln Chafee 0% Other 2% Undecided 14%
Field Poll Margin of error: ± 5.0% Sample size: 391	September 17 – October 4, 2015	Hillary Clinton; 40%	Bernie Sanders; 31%	Joe Biden 15% Martin O'Malley 1% Lincoln Chafee 0% Jim Webb 1% Other 2% Undecided 12%
USC/LA Times Margin of error: ± 3.6% Sample size: ?	August 29 – September 8, 2015	Hillary Clinton; 42%	Bernie Sanders; 26%	Other/NA 16% Undecided 16%
USC/LA Times Margin of error: ± 3.6% Sample size: ?	August 29 – September 8, 2015	Hillary Clinton; 39%	Bernie Sanders; 23%	Joe Biden 11% Other/NA 11% Undecided 16%
Field Poll Margin of error: ± 7.0% Sample size: 356	April 23 – May 16, 2015	Hillary Clinton; 53%	Elizabeth Warren; 13%	Joe Biden 6% Bernie Sanders 5% Jim Webb 1% Martin O'Malley 0% Lincoln Chafee 0% Undecided/other 22%
Emerson College Margin of error: ± ? Sample size: 487	April 2–8, 2015	Hillary Clinton; 56%	Elizabeth Warren; 11%	Joe Biden 8% Bernie Sanders 3% Martin O'Malley 2% Jim Webb 1% Andrew Cuomo 0% Other 2% Undecided 17%
Field Poll Margin of error: ± 5% Sample size: 425	January 26 – February 16, 2015	Hillary Clinton; 59%	Elizabeth Warren; 17%	Joe Biden 9% Bernie Sanders 6% Jim Webb 2% Others <0.5% Undecided 7%

== Results ==
Sanders won eight Congressional districts, including the Latino-heavy 34th district in Los Angeles, represented by Clinton supporter Rep. Xavier Becerra. In the 28th district the candidates were separated by just 67 votes, which covers the Los Angeles suburbs of Glendale and Burbank, and is represented by Rep. Adam Schiff.

2016 Democratic Party's presidential nominating process in California – Summary of results –
Candidate	Popular vote		Estimated delegates		
Candidate	Count	Percentage	Pledged	Unpledged	Total
Hillary Clinton	2,745,302	53.07%	254	66	320
Bernie Sanders	2,381,722	46.04%	221	0	221
Willie Wilson	12,014	0.23%			
Michael Steinberg	10,880	0.21%			
Rocky De La Fuente	8,453	0.16%			
Henry Hewes	7,743	0.15%			
Keith Judd	7,201	0.14%			
Write-in	23	0.00%			
Uncommitted	—N/a			10	10
Total	5,173,338	100%	475	76	551

=== Results by county ===
County	Clinton	%	Sanders	%	Others	%	Totals	Turnout (%)	Margin	%
Alameda	164,889	51.5%	153,955	48.0%	1,577	0.5%	320,421		10,934	3.4%
Alpine	113	44.8%	137	54.4%	2	0.8%	252		24	-9.5%
Amador	2,516	50.4%	2,386	47.8%	88	1.8%	4,990		130	2.6%
Butte	11,766	37.0%	19,739	62.0%	315	1.0%	31,820		7,973	-25.1%
Calaveras	2,971	49.5%	2,914	48.5%	123	2.0%	6,008		57	0.9%
Colusa	835	49.3%	809	47.8%	48	2.8%	1,692		26	1.5%
Contra Costa	103,333	56.7%	77,862	42.7%	1,082	0.6%	182,277		25,471	14.0%
Del Norte	1,119	40.4%	1,598	57.6%	55	2.0%	2,772		479	-17.3%
El Dorado	12,492	49.1%	12,620	49.6%	313	1.2%	25,425		128	-0.5%
Fresno	45,436	56.0%	34,663	42.7%	998	1.2%	81,097		10,773	13.3%
Glenn	911	46.8%	1,003	51.5%	34	1.7%	1,948		92	-4.7%
Humboldt	8,135	28.7%	19,928	70.4%	240	0.8%	28,303		11,793	-41.7%
Imperial	9,843	65.0%	5,111	33.7%	190	1.3%	15,144		4,732	31.2%
Inyo	1,001	42.5%	1,313	55.7%	44	1.9%	2,358		312	-13.2%
Kern	28,806	54.1%	23,374	43.9%	1,054	2.0%	53,234		5,432	10.2%
Kings	4,150	57.8%	2,869	39.9%	165	2.3%	7,184		1,281	17.8%
Lake	3,988	42.7%	5,195	55.7%	148	1.6%	9,331		1,207	-12.9%
Lassen	812	42.6%	1,023	53.7%	70	3.7%	1,905		211	-11.1%
Los Angeles	780,013	54.4%	639,886	44.6%	14,768	1.0%	1,434,667		140,127	9.8%
Madera	5,808	53.1%	4,852	44.4%	279	2.6%	10,939		956	8.7%
Marin	43,283	56.4%	33,214	43.3%	260	0.3%	76,757		10,069	13.1%
Mariposa	1,102	44.1%	1,355	54.2%	44	1.8%	2,501		253	-10.1%
Mendocino	6,048	32.8%	12,259	66.5%	119	0.6%	18,426		6,211	-33.7%
Merced	10,839	53.0%	9,273	45.3%	339	1.7%	20,451		1,566	7.7%
Modoc	281	42.3%	349	52.5%	35	5.3%	665		68	-10.2%
Mono	799	43.3%	1,038	56.2%	10	0.5%	1,847		239	-12.9%
Monterey	29,730	52.8%	26,073	46.3%	513	0.9%	56,316		3,657	6.5%
Napa	13,583	53.4%	11,682	45.9%	190	0.7%	25,455		1,901	7.5%
Nevada	8,175	36.9%	13,827	62.4%	148	0.7%	22,150		5,652	-25.5%
Orange	171,593	51.9%	156,235	47.3%	2,767	0.8%	330,595		15,358	4.6%
Placer	25,249	54.1%	20,916	44.8%	490	1.1%	46,655		4,333	9.3%
Plumas	1,211	44.1%	1,475	53.7%	62	2.3%	2,748		264	-9.6%
Riverside	112,526	56.1%	85,918	42.8%	2,197	1.1%	200,641		26,608	13.3%
Sacramento	109,898	54.6%	89,428	44.4%	1,933	1.0%	201,259		20,470	10.2%
San Benito	4,112	54.3%	3,380	44.6%	83	1.1%	7,575		732	9.7%
San Bernardino	96,076	54.6%	77,706	44.2%	2,194	1.2%	175,976		18,370	10.4%
San Diego	215,655	51.6%	199,716	47.7%	2,909	0.7%	418,280		15,939	3.8%
San Francisco	116,359	53.6%	99,594	45.9%	961	0.4%	216,914		16,765	7.7%
San Joaquin	38,212	56.5%	28,523	42.2%	879	1.3%	67,614		9,689	14.3%
San Luis Obispo	21,637	46.7%	24,379	52.6%	346	0.7%	46,362		2,742	-5.9%
San Mateo	79,756	58.7%	55,367	40.8%	705	0.5%	135,828		24,389	18.0%
Santa Barbara	31,927	46.9%	35,717	52.4%	474	0.7%	68,118		3,790	-5.6%
Santa Clara	159,480	57.5%	116,193	41.9%	1,840	0.7%	277,513		43,287	15.6%
Santa Cruz	29,520	40.5%	42,940	59.0%	377	0.5%	72,837		13,420	-18.4%
Shasta	7,809	45.4%	9,026	52.4%	377	2.2%	17,212		1,217	-7.1%
Sierra	224	42.5%	297	56.4%	6	1.1%	527		73	-13.9%
Siskiyou	2,466	38.0%	3,894	60.0%	126	1.9%	6,486		1,428	-22.0%
Solano	34,231	55.3%	27,122	43.8%	527	0.9%	61,880		7,109	11.5%
Sonoma	55,595	47.3%	61,167	52.0%	803	0.7%	117,565		5,572	-4.7%
Stanislaus	24,359	51.2%	22,384	47.1%	798	1.7%	47,541		1,975	4.2%
Sutter	4,023	52.7%	3,463	45.4%	146	1.9%	7,632		560	7.3%
Tehama	2,372	45.9%	2,655	51.4%	136	2.6%	5,163		283	-5.5%
Trinity	672	35.1%	1,211	63.3%	31	1.6%	1,914		539	-28.2%
Tulare	13,472	54.4%	10,834	43.7%	468	1.9%	24,774		2,638	10.6%
Tuolumne	3,433	48.2%	3,592	50.5%	91	1.3%	7,116		159	-2.2%
Ventura	60,615	51.2%	56,751	47.9%	1,015	0.9%	118,381		3,864	3.3%
Yolo	17,655	48.2%	18,761	51.3%	190	0.5%	36,606		1,106	-3.0%
Yuba	2,388	45.1%	2,771	52.4%	132	2.5%	5,291		383	-7.2%
Total	2,745,302	53.1%	2,381,722	46.0%	46,314	0.9%	5,173,338		363,580	7.0%

== Analysis ==
Clinton won the California primary, after Bernie Sanders had made a very serious play for the state and barnstormed it before election day. Sanders was significantly behind in the overall race by the time California voted (June 7, 2016), and it would have been hard for him to win the nomination by that point unless he persuaded Superdelegates to switch their support to him at the convention. He hoped a California win would assist in that effort. He rallied large numbers of supporters across the state, but in the end his barnstorming did not prevail, with Clinton winning by seven points (more than most polls predicted). She won in all the major cities: Sacramento, San Francisco, San Jose, Fresno, Los Angeles, and San Diego; Sanders did well in the northernmost counties bordering Oregon where he had won the month before. After Sanders' disappointing loss, Rose Kapolczynski, an advisor to Barbara Boxer, described the primary results: "You can have a lot of excitement and a compelling message and inspire people, but if they don’t show up to vote, it doesn’t matter. Sanders did have very impressive rallies all over the state, but were those people turning around and calling their neighbors and taking action to get other people to vote for Sanders?"

For her part, Clinton had campaigned aggressively for the state's diverse electorate, with Spanish, Korean, Vietnamese, Tagalog, and Chinese-language ads being aired by her campaign on the airwaves and on TV to make a play for both Latino and Asian American voters.

Clinton was declared the presumptive winner of the democratic nomination by multiple news outlets on June 6, the night before the California primary. She had previously not had enough delegates, and the declaration that she had clinched the nomination was based on a survey of superdelegates, not on votes. This announcement being made the night before a primary as large as California's was considered controversial, and may or may not have affected voter turnout the next day.
