= 2016 Montana Democratic presidential primary =

- June 7, 2016

Candidate	Bernie Sanders	Hillary Clinton
Home state	Vermont	New York
Delegate count	11	10
Popular vote	65,156	55,805
Percentage	51.56%	44.16%
Election results by county.
Sanders
40 – 50%
50 – 60%
60 – 70%
Clinton
40 – 50%
50 – 60%
60 – 70%
Tie
40 – 50%

The 2016 Montana Democratic presidential primary was held on June 7 in the U.S. state of Montana as one of the Democratic Party's primaries ahead of the 2016 presidential election.

The Democratic Party's primaries in California, New Jersey, New Mexico and South Dakota were held the same day, as were Republican primaries in the same five states, including their own Montana primary. Additionally, the Democratic Party held North Dakota caucuses the same day.

== Opinion polling ==
Poll source	Date	1st	2nd	3rd	Other
Official Primary results	June 7, 2016	Bernie Sanders; 51.6%	Hillary Clinton; 44.2%		No Preference; 4.3%
Gravis Marketing Margin of error: 3% Sample size: 1,035	February 24–25, 2015	Hillary Clinton; 42.2%	Elizabeth Warren; 34.3%	Joe Biden; 5.9%	Jim Webb 2.9%, Mark Warner 2%, Martin O'Malley 1%, Unsure 11.8%
Public Policy Polling Margin of error: ± 5% Sample size: 381	November 15–17, 2013	Hillary Clinton; 47%	Brian Schweitzer; 26%	Elizabeth Warren; 8%	Joe Biden 6%, Andrew Cuomo 3%, Cory Booker 1%, Martin O'Malley 1%, Kirsten Gillibrand 0%, Mark Warner 0%, Someone Else/Undecided 7%
Public Policy Polling Margin of error: ± 5.6% Sample size: 316	June 21–23, 2013	Hillary Clinton; 52%	Brian Schweitzer; 17%	Joe Biden; 9%	Cory Booker 3%, Elizabeth Warren 3%, Andrew Cuomo 1%, Kirsten Gillibrand 1%, Martin O'Malley 0%, Mark Warner 0%, Someone Else/Undecided 13%
Public Policy Polling Margin of error: ± 5.1% Sample size: 371	February 15–17, 2013	Hillary Clinton; 58%	Brian Schweitzer; 22%	Joe Biden; 9%	Elizabeth Warren 5%, Andrew Cuomo 3%, Martin O'Malley 1%, Deval Patrick 1%, Kirsten Gillibrand 0%, Mark Warner 0%, Someone Else/Undecided 5%
Public Policy Polling Margin of error: ± 5.1% Sample size: 371	February 15–17, 2013	Brian Schweitzer; 35%	Joe Biden; 28%	Elizabeth Warren; 13%	Mark Warner 5%, Andrew Cuomo 4%, Kirsten Gillibrand 1%, Martin O'Malley 1%, Deval Patrick 0%, Someone Else/Undecided 13%
Public Policy Polling Margin of error: ± 5.1% Sample size: 371	February 15–17, 2013	Brian Schweitzer; 46%	Elizabeth Warren; 18%	Andrew Cuomo; 12%	Mark Warner 3%, Martin O'Malley 2%, Kirsten Gillibrand 1%, Deval Patrick 1%, Someone Else/Undecided 18%

== Results ==
Montana Democratic primary, June 7, 2016
Candidate	Popular vote		Estimated delegates		
Candidate	Count	Percentage	Pledged	Unpledged	Total
Bernie Sanders	65,156	51.56%	11	1	12
Hillary Clinton	55,805	44.16%	10	5	15
No preference	5,415	4.28%	0	0	0
Uncommitted	—N/a		0	0	0
Total	126,376	100%	21	6	27

== Analysis ==
Heading into the final batch of primaries on June 7, Montana was generally seen as a state Bernie Sanders would win, being largely whiter and more rural and less densely populated than the country at-large. Sanders has also generally performed well in the Pacific Northwest. Having put Barack Obama over the top mathematically in its Democratic Primary in 2008, Montana again voted against Hillary Clinton in 2016.

While Clinton won in the cities of Great Falls and Billings (where she had dispatched her husband earlier that month), Sanders won in Helena and Missoula and swept most of the rural counties of the state. However, that same day Clinton won large victories in California, New Jersey, New Mexico, and South Dakota and was able to claim the Democratic nomination.
