= Martin, South Dakota =

Martin, South Dakota Pažóla Otȟúŋwahe
- City
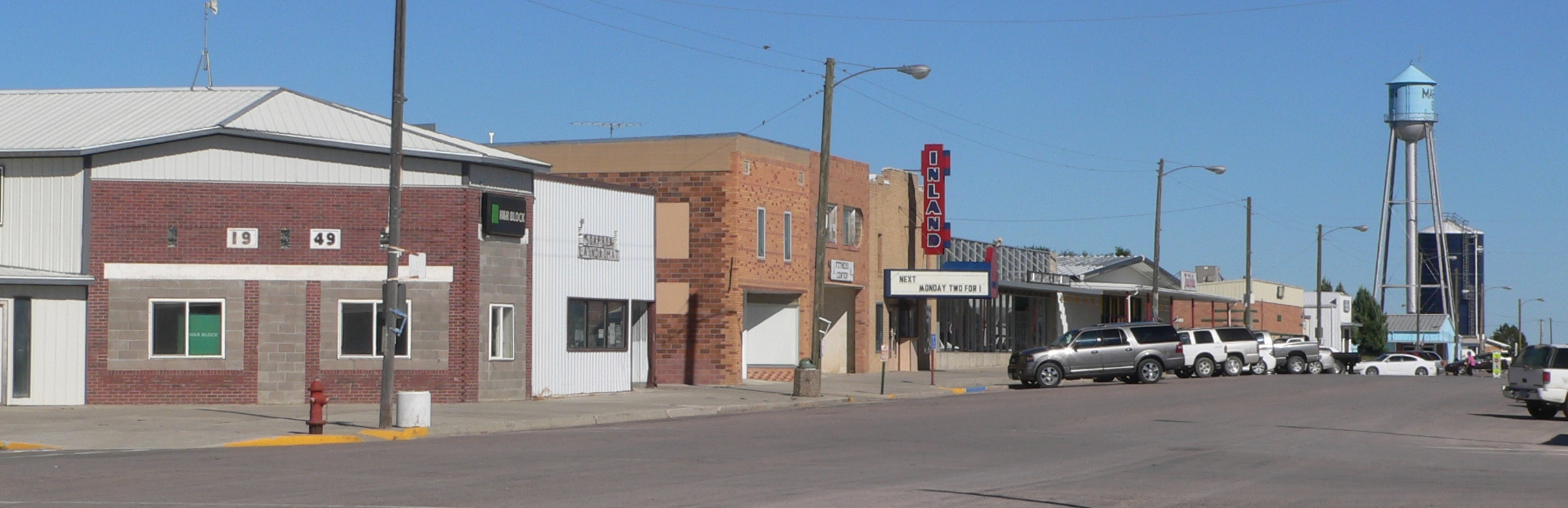
- Downtown Martin: Main Street, looking northeast from 4th Avenue

- Location of Martin, South Dakota
- Coordinates: 43°10′30″N 101°43′56″W
- Country: United States
- State: South Dakota
- County: Bennett
- Laid out: 1911
- Founded: 1912

Area
  - Total: 0.560 sq mi (1.451 km^{2})
  - Land: 0.560 sq mi (1.451 km^{2})
  - Water: 0 sq mi (0.000 km^{2})
- Elevation: 3,324 ft (1,013 m)

Population (2020)
  - Total: 938
  - Density: 1,650/sq mi (638/km^{2})
- Time zone: UTC−7 (Mountain (MST))
  - Summer (DST): UTC−6 (MDT)
- ZIP Code: 57551
- Area code: 605
- FIPS code: 46-41100
- GNIS feature ID: 1267471
- Sales tax: 4.2%
- Website: cityofmartinsd.com

Martin (Lakota: Pažóla Otȟúŋwahe) is a city and the county seat of Bennett County, South Dakota, United States. The population was 938 at the 2020 census.

== History ==
Martin was laid out in 1911. The city was named for Eben Martin, a U.S. Representative from South Dakota.

== Geography ==
According to the United States Census Bureau, the city has a total area of 0.560 square miles (1.45 km^{2}), all land.

=== Climate ===
Climate data for Martin, South Dakota (1991–2020)
Month	Jan	Feb	Mar	Apr	May	Jun	Jul	Aug	Sep	Oct	Nov	Dec	Year
Mean daily maximum °F (°C)	34.9 (1.6)	38.2 (3.4)	49.6 (9.8)	58.7 (14.8)	68.9 (20.5)	79.4 (26.3)	87.3 (30.7)	85.9 (29.9)	77.4 (25.2)	60.9 (16.1)	46.7 (8.2)	35.8 (2.1)	60.3 (15.7)
Daily mean °F (°C)	23.8 (−4.6)	26.6 (−3.0)	36.8 (2.7)	45.3 (7.4)	55.6 (13.1)	66.0 (18.9)	73.2 (22.9)	71.5 (21.9)	62.7 (17.1)	47.7 (8.7)	34.7 (1.5)	25.3 (−3.7)	47.4 (8.6)
Mean daily minimum °F (°C)	12.7 (−10.7)	15.1 (−9.4)	24.0 (−4.4)	31.9 (−0.1)	42.4 (5.8)	52.6 (11.4)	59.2 (15.1)	57.2 (14.0)	47.9 (8.8)	34.6 (1.4)	22.7 (−5.2)	14.8 (−9.6)	34.6 (1.4)
Average precipitation inches (mm)	0.42 (11)	0.65 (17)	1.23 (31)	2.40 (61)	3.33 (85)	3.46 (88)	2.86 (73)	2.16 (55)	1.19 (30)	1.60 (41)	0.75 (19)	0.63 (16)	20.68 (527)
Average snowfall inches (cm)	4.7 (12)	7.8 (20)	8.8 (22)	9.0 (23)	1.8 (4.6)	0.0 (0.0)	0.0 (0.0)	0.0 (0.0)	0.1 (0.25)	2.4 (6.1)	5.7 (14)	8.1 (21)	48.4 (122.95)
Source: NOAA

== Demographics ==
Historical population
Census	Pop.	Note	%±
1930	720		—
1940	1,013		40.7%
1950	989		−2.4%
1960	1,184		19.7%
1970	1,248		5.4%
1980	1,018		−18.4%
1990	1,151		13.1%
2000	1,106		−3.9%
2010	1,071		−3.2%
2020	938		−12.4%
2023 (est.)	926		−1.3%
U.S. Decennial Census; 2020 Census

=== 2023 American Community Survey ===
As of the 2023 American Community Survey, there are 372 estimated households in Martin with an average of 2.72 persons per household. The city has a median household income of $49,609. Approximately 14.7% of the city's population lives at or below the poverty line. Martin has an estimated 59.0% employment rate, with 35.1% of the population holding a bachelor's degree or higher and 95.3% holding a high school diploma.

The top five reported ancestries (people were allowed to report up to two ancestries, thus the figures will generally add to more than 100%) were English (94.9%), Spanish (0.1%), Indo-European (0.0%), Asian and Pacific Islander (3.1%), and Other (1.9%).

The median age in the city was 34.6 years.

=== Racial and ethnic composition ===
Martin, South Dakota – racial and ethnic composition Note: the US Census treats Hispanic/Latino as an ethnic category. This table excludes Latinos from the racial categories and assigns them to a separate category. Hispanics/Latinos may be of any race.
Race / ethnicity (NH = non-Hispanic)	Pop. 2000	Pop. 2010	Pop. 2020	% 2000	% 2010	% 2020
White alone (NH)	586	433	330	52.98%	40.43%	35.18%
Black or African American alone (NH)	7	1	5	0.63%	0.09%	0.53%
Native American or Alaska Native alone (NH)	405	495	449	36.62%	46.22%	47.87%
Asian alone (NH)	1	13	7	0.09%	1.21%	0.75%
Pacific Islander alone (NH)	0	0	0	0.00%	0.00%	0.00%
Other race alone (NH)	0	2	0	0.00%	0.19%	0.00%
Mixed race or multiracial (NH)	69	83	101	6.24%	7.75%	10.77%
Hispanic or Latino (any race)	38	44	46	3.44%	4.11%	4.90%
Total	1,106	1,071	938	100.00%	100.00%	100.00%

=== 2020 census ===
As of the 2020 census, Martin had a population of 938. The median age was 36.5 years. 29.6% of residents were under the age of 18 and 20.1% of residents were 65 years of age or older. For every 100 females there were 91.4 males, and for every 100 females age 18 and over there were 81.3 males.

0.0% of residents lived in urban areas, while 100.0% lived in rural areas.

There were 380 households in Martin, of which 28.9% had children under the age of 18 living in them. Of all households, 30.0% were married-couple households, 18.9% were households with a male householder and no spouse or partner present, and 41.6% were households with a female householder and no spouse or partner present. About 40.0% of all households were made up of individuals and 17.6% had someone living alone who was 65 years of age or older.

There were 411 housing units, of which 7.5% were vacant. The homeowner vacancy rate was 1.4% and the rental vacancy rate was 5.8%.

Racial composition as of the 2020 census
Race	Number	Percent
White	339	36.1%
Black or African American	5	0.5%
American Indian and Alaska Native	458	48.8%
Asian	7	0.7%
Native Hawaiian and Other Pacific Islander	0	0.0%
Some other race	2	0.2%
Two or more races	127	13.5%
Hispanic or Latino (of any race)	46	4.9%

=== 2010 census ===
As of the 2010 census, there were 1,071 people, 401 households, and 246 families living in the city. The population density was 2,020.8 inhabitants per square mile (780.2/km^{2}). There were 467 housing units at an average density of 881.1 per square mile (340.2/km^{2}). The racial makeup of the city was 41.64% White, 0.09% African American, 48.27% Native American, 1.21% Asian, 0.00% Pacific Islander, 0.47% from some other races and 8.31% from two or more races. Hispanic or Latino people of any race were 4.11% of the population.

There were 401 households, of which 37.9% had children under the age of 18 living with them, 34.7% were married couples living together, 19.2% had a female householder with no husband present, 7.5% had a male householder with no wife present, and 38.7% were non-families. 32.7% of all households were made up of individuals, and 15.7% had someone living alone who was 65 years of age or older. The average household size was 2.58 and the average family size was 3.26.

The median age in the city was 31.7 years. 30.4% of residents were under the age of 18; 11.4% were between the ages of 18 and 24; 20.8% were from 25 to 44; 21.6% were from 45 to 64; and 15.8% were 65 years of age or older. The gender makeup of the city was 46.8% male and 53.2% female.

=== 2000 census ===
As of the 2000 census, there were 1,106 people, 421 households, and 253 families living in the city. The population density was 1,210.5 inhabitants per square mile (467.4/km^{2}). There were 480 housing units at an average density of 525.3 per square mile (202.8/km^{2}). The racial makeup of the city was 53.98% White, 0.63% African American, 37.61% Native American, 0.09% Asian, 0.00% Pacific Islander, 0.36% from some other races and 7.32% from two or more races. Hispanic or Latino people of any race were 3.44% of the population.

There were 421 households, out of which 33.0% had children under the age of 18 living with them, 41.8% were married couples living together, 14.5% had a female householder with no husband present, and 39.7% were non-families. 35.6% of all households were made up of individuals, and 17.6% had someone living alone who was 65 years of age or older. The average household size was 2.51 and the average family size was 3.28.

In the city, the population was spread out, with 31.6% under the age of 18, 7.6% from 18 to 24, 23.1% from 25 to 44, 19.0% from 45 to 64, and 18.7% who were 65 years of age or older. The median age was 36 years. For every 100 females, there were 90.4 males. For every 100 females age 18 and over, there were 85.1 males.

As of 2000 the median income for a household in the city was $26,779, and the median income for a family was $32,500. Males had a median income of $26,964 versus $19,632 for females. The per capita income for the city was $13,752. About 19.0% of families and 24.9% of the population were below the poverty line, including 32.5% of those under age 18 and 14.2% of those age 65 or over.

=== Crime ===
In 2023, violent crime was 13 per 100,000, and property crime was 35 per 100,000.

== Education ==
The Bennett County School District serves all of Bennett County.

== Infrastructure ==
One of the highways that passes through Martin is U.S. Route 18, in an east–west direction. South Dakota Highway 73 runs north into the town and makes a T-intersection with U.S. 18. State Highway 73 turns into Hisle Road after the T-intersection.

The only transportation for Martin is by road (U.S. 18, State Highway 73), or by air (Martin Municipal Airport).

== Notable people ==
- Vine Deloria Jr was an author, theologian, historian, and activist for Native American rights. Born in Martin.
- Jay Novacek, an American football and College Football Hall of Fame tight end was born in Martin, South Dakota
