= Bennett County School District =

School district in South Dakota, United States

Address
- 403 1st Avenue Martin, South Dakota, 57551; United States

District information
- Type: Public
- Grades: PreK–12
- NCES District ID: 4606240

Students and staff
- Students: 494
- Teachers: 44.03
- Staff: 59.3
- Student–teacher ratio: 11.22

Other information
- Website: www.bennettco.k12.sd.us

Bennett County School District 03-1 is a school district headquartered in Martin, South Dakota. It has three schools: Martin Elementary School, Bennett County Middle School, and Bennett County High School.

The district serves all of Bennett County. It includes portions of the Pine Ridge Indian Reservation.

In 2015 Stacy Halverson became the superintendent.

== Operations ==
As of 2003 the district has a $6 million budget, with $1.9 million of it being direct-aid from the state, or about 1/3rd of the budget. In turn 80% of the budget is used on salaries, so reduction of employees would be needed if the budget was reduced.
