= Bennett County, South Dakota =

County in South Dakota, United States

- County
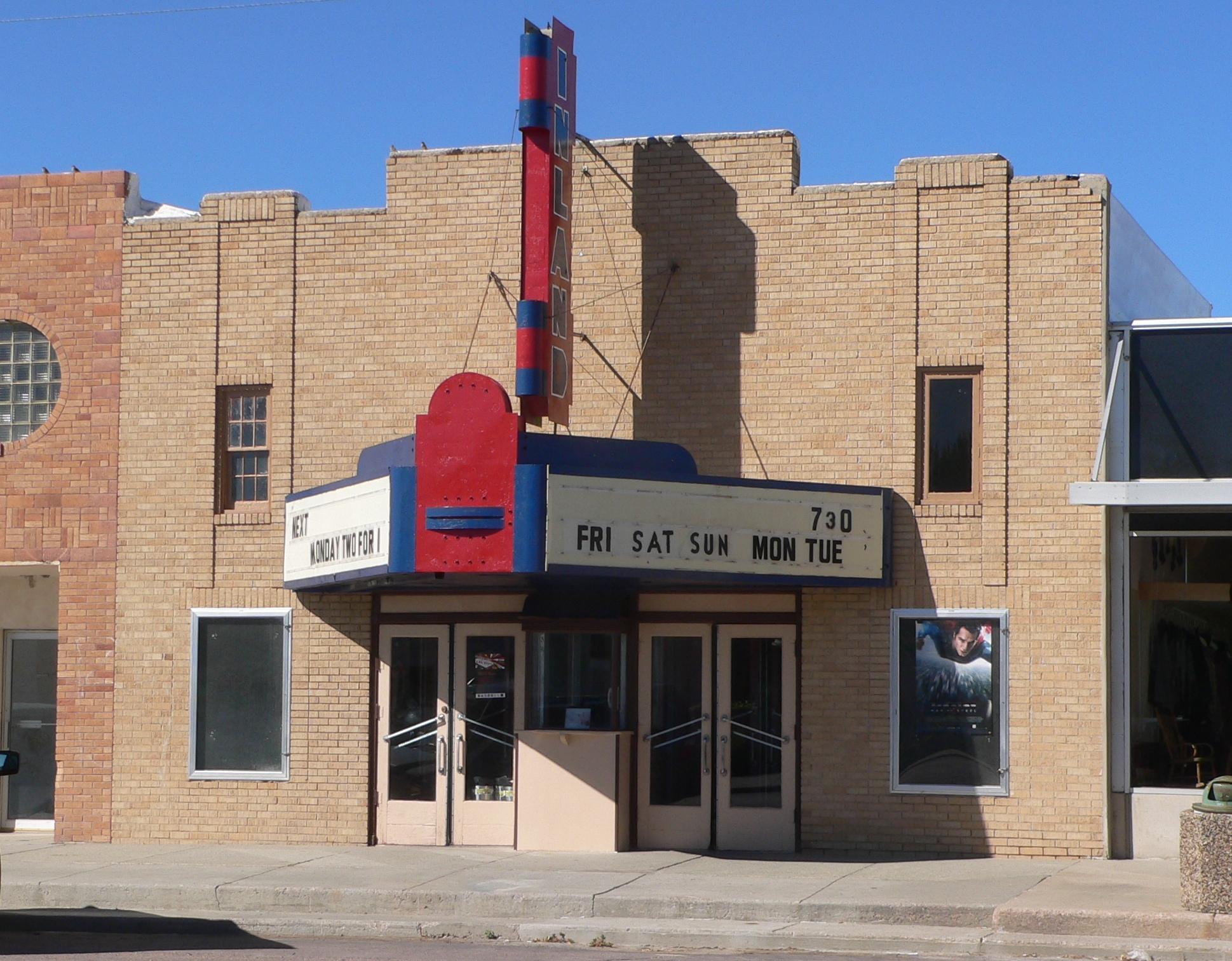
- Art Deco style Inland Theater at Martin SD.

- Location within the U.S. state of South Dakota
- Coordinates: 43°11′12.883″N 101°40′37.851″W
- Country: United States
- State: South Dakota
- Founded: June 3, 1909 (created); April 27, 1912 (organized)
- Named for: John E. Bennett or Granville G. Bennett
- Seat: Martin
- Largest city: Martin

Area
  - Total: 1,190.451 sq mi (3,083.25 km^{2})
  - Land: 1,184.642 sq mi (3,068.21 km^{2})
  - Water: 5.809 sq mi (15.05 km^{2}) 0.5%

Population (2020)
  - Total: 3,381
  - Estimate (2025): 3,307 ▼
  - Density: 2.788/sq mi (1.076/km^{2})
- Time zone: UTC−7 (Mountain)
  - Summer (DST): UTC−6 (MDT)
- Congressional district: At-large

Bennett County is a county in the U.S. state of South Dakota. As of the 2020 census, the population was 3,381. Its county seat is Martin. Bennett County was removed from the Pine Ridge Reservation by an act of Congress in 1911, much of Bennett County however is still held in trust by the Reservation. To the east is the Rosebud Indian Reservation, where dwell the Sicangu Oyate, also known the Upper Brulé Sioux Nation and the Rosebud Sioux Tribe (RST), a branch of the Lakota people.

The North American continental pole of inaccessibility is in Bennett County, located 1,650 km (1,030 mi) from the nearest coastline, between Allen and Kyle (Oglala Lakota County) at 43.36°N 101.97°W.

Historically, ranching and dry land farming have been the chief agricultural pursuits possible given climate and soil conditions.

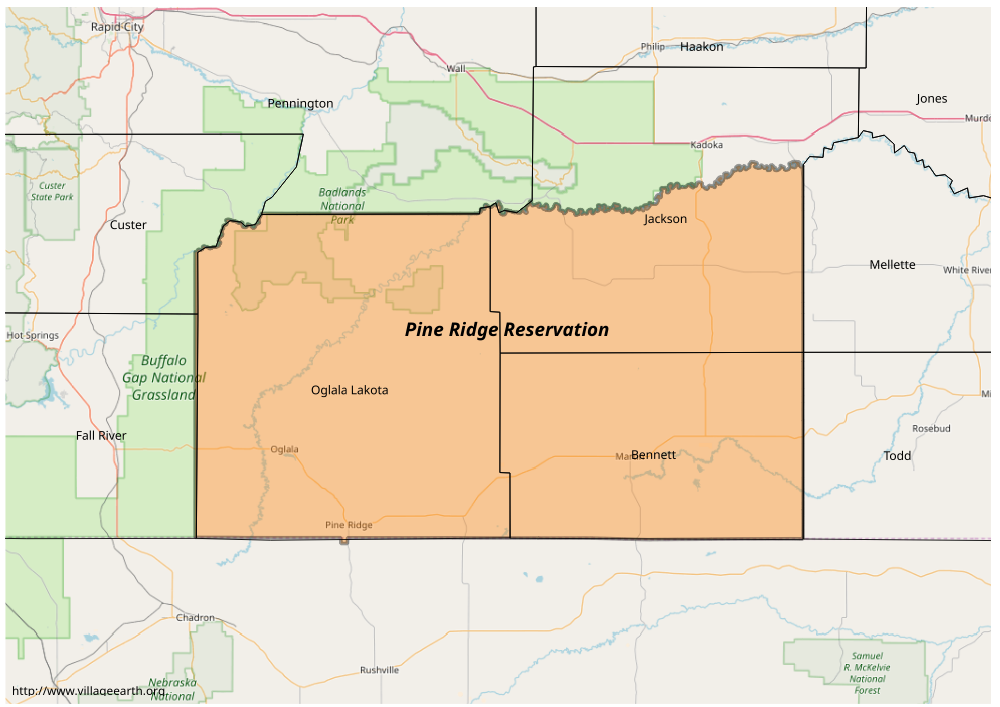
Bennett County lies entirely within the boundaries of the Pine Ridge Indian Reservation.

== History ==
This land has for centuries been the traditional territory of the Oglala Lakota, also known as the Sioux; it has been part of their legally defined territory since the treaty of 1851 and has remained within its legal boundaries through various other Treaties and Acts that reduced their land base to the current boundaries of the Pine Ridge Indian Reservation when the reservation was created by the Act of March 2, 1889 (25 Stat. 888). Despite its reservation status, most of the county was opened for settlement by the Act of May 27, 1910, where the US Congress "authorized and directed the Secretary of Interior to sell and dispose of all that portion of the Pine Ridge Indian Reservation, in the State of South Dakota, lying and being in Bennett County". Open settlement was ended by a Secretarial Order of June 10, 1936, which restored "to tribal ownership of all lands which are now, or may hereafter be, classified as undisposed-of surplus opened lands of the Pine Ridge Reservation...." The allotment process left the county's landownership a "checkerboard" mixture of Indian trust lands and state and private lands.

The county was created in 1909, with land partitioned from Fall River County. On April 27, 1912, the county's first board of commissioners was elected. In November 1912, residents chose the town of Martin as the county seat.

== Dispute Over Reservation Status ==
A 1975 decision of the Eighth Circuit Court decided that Bennett County was not to be considered part of the Pine Ridge Reservation. However, the federal government participated in that lawsuit only as amicus, and did not consider itself bound by that decision because it did not participate in the litigation. The United States was a party in United States v. Bennett County, 394 F.2d 8 (8th Cir. 1968), in which the State of South Dakota had to obtain permission from the Department of the Interior in order to fix roads or condemn property in Bennett County, consistent with the property's reservation status. Putnam v. United States 248 F.2d 292 (8th Cir. 1957) ruled that "Bennett County is within the Pine Ridge Indian Reservation created by the Act of Congress of March 2, 1889, 25 Stat. 888." The Federal Government recognizes Bennett County as being entirely within the Pine Ridge Indian Reservation. In 2004, in State of South Dakota v. Acting Great Plains Regional Director, Bureau of Indian Affairs Docket Number IBIA3-24-A the State of South Dakota argued against an Oglala Sioux Tribal member's application to the BIA to return a 10-acre tract of land in Bennett County into Federal Trust arguing it was outside of the Boundary of the Pine Ridge Reservation. The judge ruled in favor of the applicant and Bureau of Indian Affairs' affirming that Bennett County is indeed within the boundaries of the Reservation.

== Native/Non-Native Relations ==
Both Lakota and European Americans have worked during recent decades to improve relations between the groups, which residents commonly refer to as full-bloods, mixed-bloods (usually both identified as Native American) and whites. Intermarriage continues between the groups and cooperation has been increasing. In the mid-1990s, residents co-sponsored a concurrent powwow and rodeo in the county. By the 1990s, people of Native American descent comprised the majority of county residents. In the 2000 Census, 5.7% of the people in Bennett County identified as mixed-race Native American-European American (more Lakota socially identify as having mixed-race ancestry). This is the highest percentage of any county within US boundaries, except northeastern Oklahoma and White Earth Indian Reservation in northwestern Minnesota.

Bennett County was in national news in 2014 when the township of Swett was put up for sale. The township's two residents listed six acres and all property in the township for sale for nearly $400,000. By 2016 the price had been reduced to $250,000, still with no takers.

== Geography ==
Bennett County lies on the south line of South Dakota. Its south boundary line abuts the north boundary line of the state of Nebraska. The Little White River flows eastward through the lower central part of the county. The highest point on the county's terrain is the SW corner, at 3,497 ft (1,066 m) ASL. Its lowest point is along the north boundary line, at 2,703 ft (824 m) ASL. The terrain consists of rolling hills cut with drainage gullies, sloping to the east-northeast.

According to the United States Census Bureau, the county has a total area of 1,190.451 square miles (3,083.25 km^{2}), of which 1,184.642 square miles (3,068.21 km^{2}) is land and 5.809 square miles (15.05 km^{2}) (0.5%) is water. It is the 23rd largest county in South Dakota by total area.

The eastern portion of South Dakota's counties (48 of 66) observe Central Time; the western counties (18 of 66) observe Mountain Time. Bennett County is the easternmost of the SD counties to observe Mountain Time.

=== Major highways ===
- U.S. Highway 18
- South Dakota Highway 73

=== Adjacent counties ===
- Jackson County – north
- Mellette County – northeast (boundary of Central Time)
- Todd County – east (boundary of Central Time)
- Cherry County, Nebraska – south (eastern part of county observes Central Time)
- Sheridan County, Nebraska – southwest
- Oglala Lakota County – west

=== Protected areas ===
- Lacreek National Wildlife Refuge
- Little White River Recreation Area
- Little White River State Game Production Area
- Todd State Game Production Area

== Demographics ==
Historical population
| Census | Pop. | Note | %± |
|---|---|---|---|
| 1910 | 96 | | — |
| 1920 | 1,924 | | 1,904.2% |
| 1930 | 4,590 | | 138.6% |
| 1940 | 3,983 | | −13.2% |
| 1950 | 3,396 | | −14.7% |
| 1960 | 3,053 | | −10.1% |
| 1970 | 3,088 | | 1.1% |
| 1980 | 3,044 | | −1.4% |
| 1990 | 3,206 | | 5.3% |
| 2000 | 3,574 | | 11.5% |
| 2010 | 3,431 | | −4.0% |
| 2020 | 3,381 | | −1.5% |
| 2025 (est.) | 3,307 | ▼ | −2.2% |
U.S. Decennial Census; 1790–1960 1900–1990; 1990–2000 2010–2020

As of the third quarter of 2024, the median home value in Bennett County was $143,900.

As of the 2023 American Community Survey, there are 1,024 estimated households in Bennett County with an average of 3.23 persons per household. The county has a median household income of $44,569. Approximately 27.7% of the county's population lives at or below the poverty line. Bennett County has an estimated 51.1% employment rate, with 20.3% of the population holding a bachelor's degree or higher and 86.9% holding a high school diploma.

The top five reported ancestries (people were allowed to report up to two ancestries, thus the figures will generally add to more than 100%) were English (88.3%), Spanish (0.1%), Indo-European (0.0%), Asian and Pacific Islander (0.9%), and Other (10.7%).

The median age in the county was 28.8 years.

Bennett County, South Dakota – racial and ethnic composition
Note: the US Census treats Hispanic/Latino as an ethnic category. This table excludes Latinos from the racial categories and assigns them to a separate category. Hispanics/Latinos may be of any race.

| Race / ethnicity (NH = non-Hispanic) | Pop. 1980 | Pop. 1990 | Pop. 2000 | Pop. 2010 | Pop. 2020 |
|---|---|---|---|---|---|
| White alone (NH) | 1,852 (60.84%) | 1,698 (52.96%) | 1,449 (40.54%) | 1,141 (33.26%) | 997 (29.49%) |
| Black or African American alone (NH) | 0 (0.00%) | 8 (0.25%) | 10 (0.28%) | 3 (0.09%) | 7 (0.21%) |
| Native American or Alaska Native alone (NH) | 1,174 (38.57%) | 1,462 (45.60%) | 1,826 (51.09%) | 2,072 (60.39%) | 2,060 (60.93%) |
| Asian alone (NH) | 0 (0.00%) | 2 (0.06%) | 2 (0.06%) | 13 (0.38%) | 7 (0.21%) |
| Pacific Islander alone (NH) | — | — | 5 (0.14%) | 3 (0.09%) | 0 (0.00%) |
| Other race alone (NH) | 1 (0.03%) | 1 (0.03%) | 1 (0.03%) | 2 (0.06%) | 2 (0.06%) |
| Mixed race or multiracial (NH) | — | — | 209 (5.85%) | 130 (3.79%) | 221 (6.54%) |
| Hispanic or Latino (any race) | 17 (0.56%) | 35 (1.09%) | 72 (2.01%) | 67 (1.95%) | 87 (2.57%) |
| Total | 3,044 (100.00%) | 3,206 (100.00%) | 3,574 (100.00%) | 3,431 (100.00%) | 3,381 (100.00%) |

=== 2020 census ===
As of the 2020 census, there were 3,381 people, 1,085 households, and 737 families residing in the county. The population density was 2.9 inhabitants per square mile (1.1/km^{2}). There were 1,177 housing units at an average density of 1.0 per square mile (0.4/km^{2}); 7.8% of the housing units were vacant. Among occupied housing units, 60.0% were owner-occupied and 40.0% were renter-occupied. The homeowner vacancy rate was 1.1% and the rental vacancy rate was 4.0%.

Of the residents, 32.9% were under the age of 18 and 14.5% were 65 years of age or older; the median age was 32.3 years. For every 100 females there were 96.2 males, and for every 100 females age 18 and over there were 89.4 males.

The racial makeup of the county was 29.9% White, 0.2% African American, 61.9% American Indian and Alaska Native, 0.2% Asian, 0.0% Pacific Islander, 0.1% from some other race, and 7.7% from two or more races. Hispanic or Latino residents of any race comprised 2.6% of the population.

There were 1,085 households in the county, of which 37.7% had children under the age of 18 living with them and 31.6% had a female householder with no spouse or partner present. About 26.1% of all households were made up of individuals and 10.8% had someone living alone who was 65 years of age or older.

=== 2010 census ===
As of the 2010 census, there were 3,431 people, 1,090 households, and 766 families in the county. The population density was 2.9 inhabitants per square mile (1.1/km^{2}). There were 1,263 housing units at an average density of 1.1 per square mile (0.42/km^{2}). The racial makeup of the county was 33.72% White, 0.12% African American, 61.47% Native American, 0.38% Asian, 0.09% Pacific Islander, 0.20% from some other races and 4.02% from two or more races. Hispanic or Latino people of any race were 1.95% of the population. In terms of ancestry, 20.9% were German, 5.1% were Swedish, and 1.9% were American.

Of the 1,090 households, 42.9% had children under the age of 18 living with them, 40.3% were married couples living together, 20.1% had a female householder with no husband present, 29.7% were non-families, and 24.3% of all households were made up of individuals. The average household size was 3.11 and the average family size was 3.73. The median age was 28.7 years.

The median income for a household in the county was $32,841 and the median income for a family was $38,487. Males had a median income of $40,158 versus $31,406 for females. The per capita income for the county was $16,153. About 24.3% of families and 32.1% of the population were below the poverty line, including 42.3% of those under age 18 and 15.4% of those age 65 or over.

== Communities ==
=== Cities ===
- Martin (county seat)

=== Census-designated places ===
- Allen

=== Unincorporated communities ===
- Blackpipe
- Harrington
- Tuthill
- Vetal

=== Former communities ===
- Swett

== Politics ==
Bennett is a solidly Republican county in Presidential elections. It has not been carried by a Democratic Presidential nominee since Lyndon Johnson’s landslide of 1964, although vis-à-vis most West River counties it has a sizeable Democratic vote and a substantial Native American population. Both John Kerry in 2004 and Barack Obama in 2008 came within five percentage points of carrying the county.

United States presidential election results for Bennett County, South Dakota
| Year | Republican | | Democratic | | Third party(ies) | |
| Year | No. | % | No. | % | No. | % |
|---|---|---|---|---|---|---|
| 1912 | 0 | 0.00% | 179 | 70.75% | 74 | 29.25% |
| 1916 | 67 | 22.56% | 222 | 74.75% | 8 | 2.69% |
| 1920 | 220 | 48.67% | 199 | 44.03% | 33 | 7.30% |
| 1924 | 444 | 57.07% | 102 | 13.11% | 232 | 29.82% |
| 1928 | 766 | 58.16% | 544 | 41.31% | 7 | 0.53% |
| 1932 | 453 | 23.74% | 1,410 | 73.90% | 45 | 2.36% |
| 1936 | 530 | 39.29% | 807 | 59.82% | 12 | 0.89% |
| 1940 | 915 | 51.55% | 860 | 48.45% | 0 | 0.00% |
| 1944 | 494 | 46.60% | 566 | 53.40% | 0 | 0.00% |
| 1948 | 477 | 38.10% | 758 | 60.54% | 17 | 1.36% |
| 1952 | 873 | 62.85% | 516 | 37.15% | 0 | 0.00% |
| 1956 | 746 | 52.13% | 685 | 47.87% | 0 | 0.00% |
| 1960 | 779 | 56.20% | 607 | 43.80% | 0 | 0.00% |
| 1964 | 624 | 44.60% | 775 | 55.40% | 0 | 0.00% |
| 1968 | 665 | 53.93% | 457 | 37.06% | 111 | 9.00% |
| 1972 | 808 | 62.83% | 476 | 37.01% | 2 | 0.16% |
| 1976 | 610 | 54.91% | 481 | 43.29% | 20 | 1.80% |
| 1980 | 919 | 69.41% | 350 | 26.44% | 55 | 4.15% |
| 1984 | 856 | 65.05% | 453 | 34.42% | 7 | 0.53% |
| 1988 | 663 | 52.54% | 579 | 45.88% | 20 | 1.58% |
| 1992 | 556 | 46.45% | 413 | 34.50% | 228 | 19.05% |
| 1996 | 539 | 47.07% | 507 | 44.28% | 99 | 8.65% |
| 2000 | 712 | 63.80% | 377 | 33.78% | 27 | 2.42% |
| 2004 | 833 | 51.10% | 759 | 46.56% | 38 | 2.33% |
| 2008 | 614 | 50.83% | 557 | 46.11% | 37 | 3.06% |
| 2012 | 626 | 52.04% | 548 | 45.55% | 29 | 2.41% |
| 2016 | 666 | 57.96% | 412 | 35.86% | 71 | 6.18% |
| 2020 | 694 | 58.66% | 466 | 39.39% | 23 | 1.94% |
| 2024 | 676 | 62.13% | 389 | 35.75% | 23 | 2.11% |

== Education ==
The Bennett County School District serves all of Bennett County.

The Bureau of Indian Education (BIE) is affiliated with the American Horse School, a K-8 school in Allen operated by a tribal group.

== See also ==
- National Register of Historic Places listing
