= Cora Babbitt Johnson =

Preservationist critic of Mount Rushmore

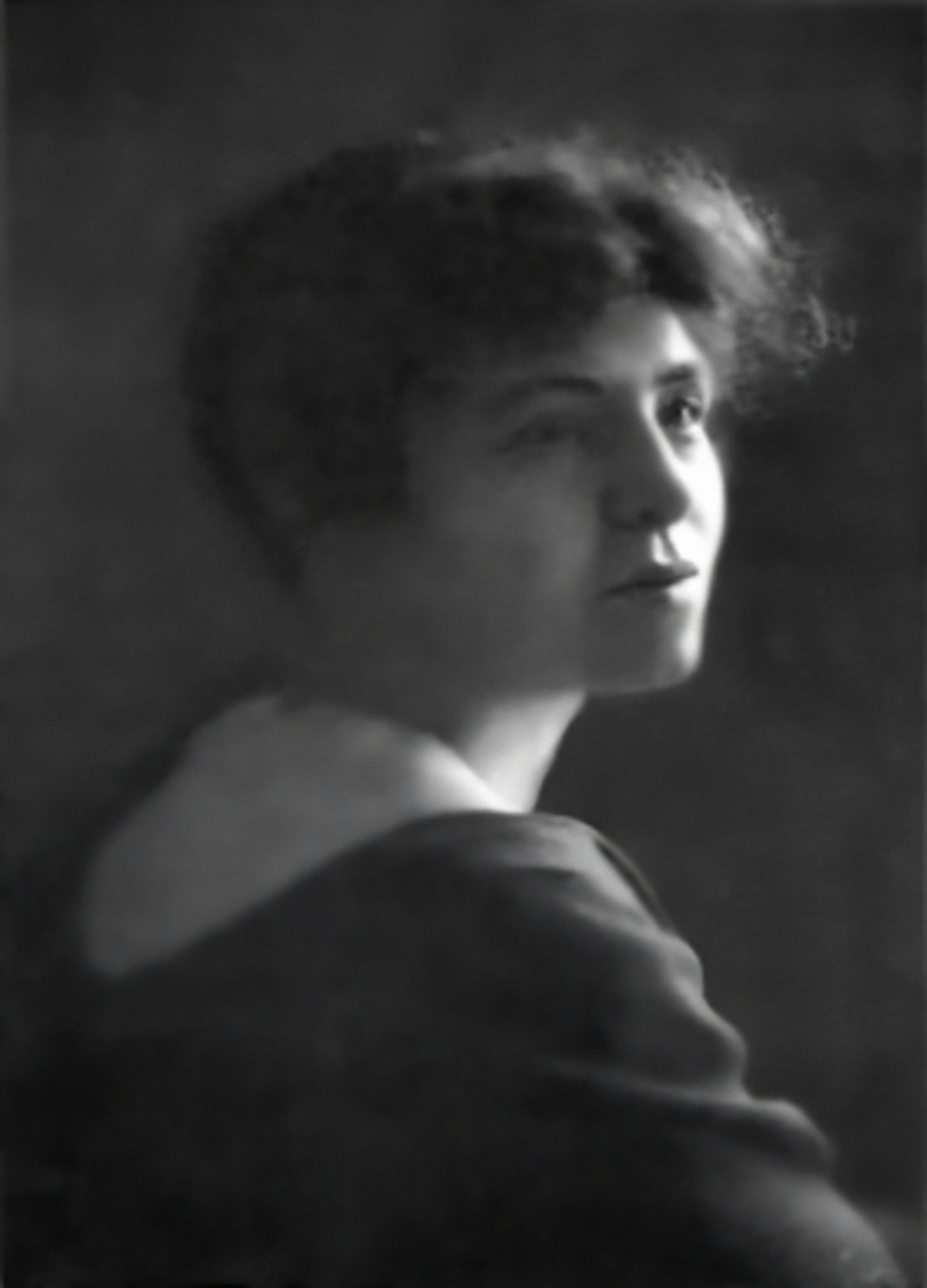
- Johnson in 1928
- Born: c. 1882; Illinois
- Occupation: Newspaper editor
- Spouse: A.T. Johnson

Cora Babbitt Johnson (born c. 1882) was an American journalist and preservationist known for her vocal opposition to the Mount Rushmore project in the Black Hills of South Dakota. A Black Hills local herself, she worked as editor-in-chief of the Hot Springs Star newspaper for eight years before becoming a features writer for other publications of the Great Plains. As part of the early conservation movement in the United States, Johnson raised concern over the Mount Rushmore project's potential impact on the local ecosystem, community, and natural beauty of the Black Hills.

== Career ==
Cora Babbitt Johnson attended the New England Conservatory of Music and studied piano. She married A.T. Johnson and moved to the Black Hills region of South Dakota, where they bought the Hot Springs Star in 1918. She became the editor-in-chief of the Hot Springs Star and was involved in local civic organizations, including the Black Hills Women's Civics Club, where she advocated for environmental conservation and community engagement. After eight years at the Hot Springs Star, Johnson became feature writer for other publications including The Kansas City Star, The Denver Post, The Omaha Bee, and The Argus Leader.

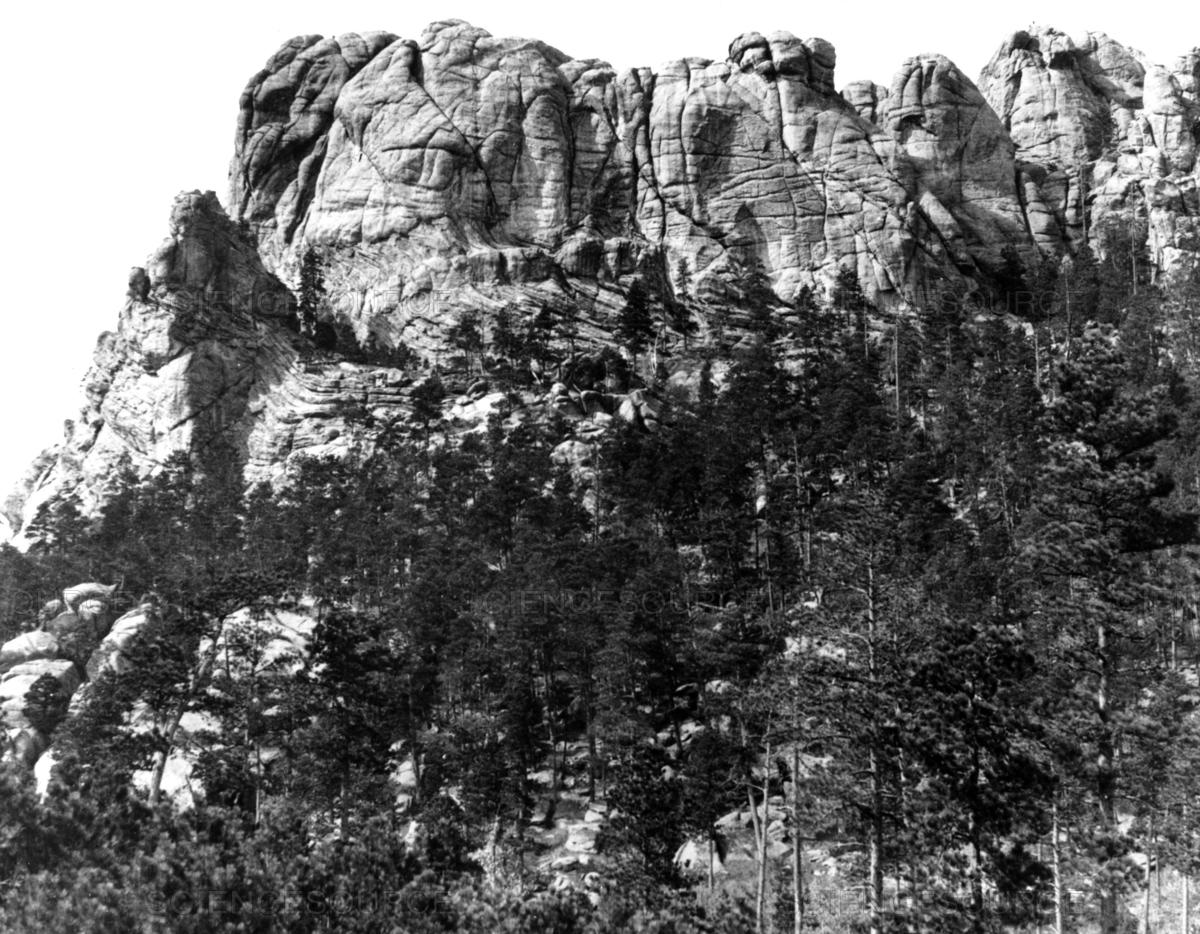
Mount Rushmore before construction, c. 1905

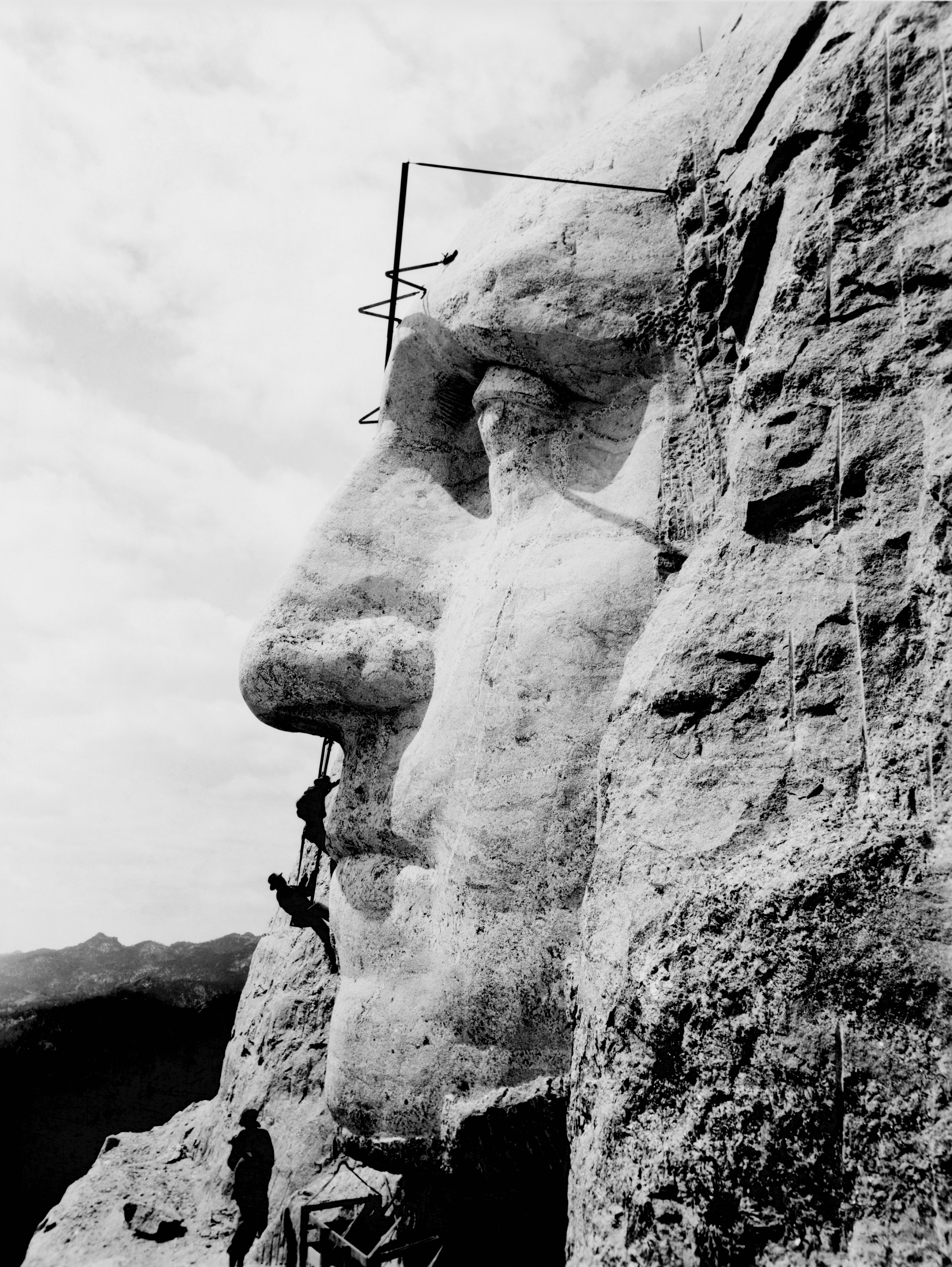
Construction on Mount Rushmore

While editor of the Hot Springs Star, Johnson wrote articles and letters critical of the Mount Rushmore project, providing opportunities for the Black Hills population to criticize the monument. Doane Robinson, the man who started the Mount Rushmore project, wrote to her husband in late 1924 to attempt to persuade the Hot Springs Star to support the project. She clarified in her response to his letter that she was responsible for the editorial as editor-in-chief and reiterated her stance on the project, stating she would not change her mind. She criticized the project because of her belief that future generations should experience the Black Hills of South Dakota as past ones did and argued that carving historical figures into the natural landscape would disrupt the region's community and desecrate its delicate ecosystem. In response, Robinson wrote to her that he "long ago learned not to argue with a lady".

In 1925, Johnson continued to oppose the project. She organized a protest against it through the South Dakota Federation of Women's Clubs. Johnson also wrote letters to people who knew Gutzon Borglum, the carver of Mount Rushmore, seeking information about Borglum's trustworthiness amidst the Stone Mountain controversy, in which Borglum was criticized (and indictments sought against him on charges of larcency) for destroying models that he had made for the Confederate memorial at Stone Mountain, Georgia. Borglum referred to Johnson as "that Hot Springs person" and called her an "agent of evil".

She also wrote letters of protest to South Dakota governor Carl Gunderson, who had previously signed the creation of the Mount Rushmore National Memorial Association into law, and swayed him against the project. Through that effort, Gunderson reportedly regretted signing the legislation into law and used his influence to halt the project until William J. Bulow replaced him as governor in 1927; construction began in August 1927. By 1930, Cora Babbitt Johnson was living in San Diego, California where she hosted a radio show, Seeing San Diego. Her husband, A. T. Johnson, died in San Diego, California, in September 1935.
