= Doane Robinson =

American historian (1856–1946)

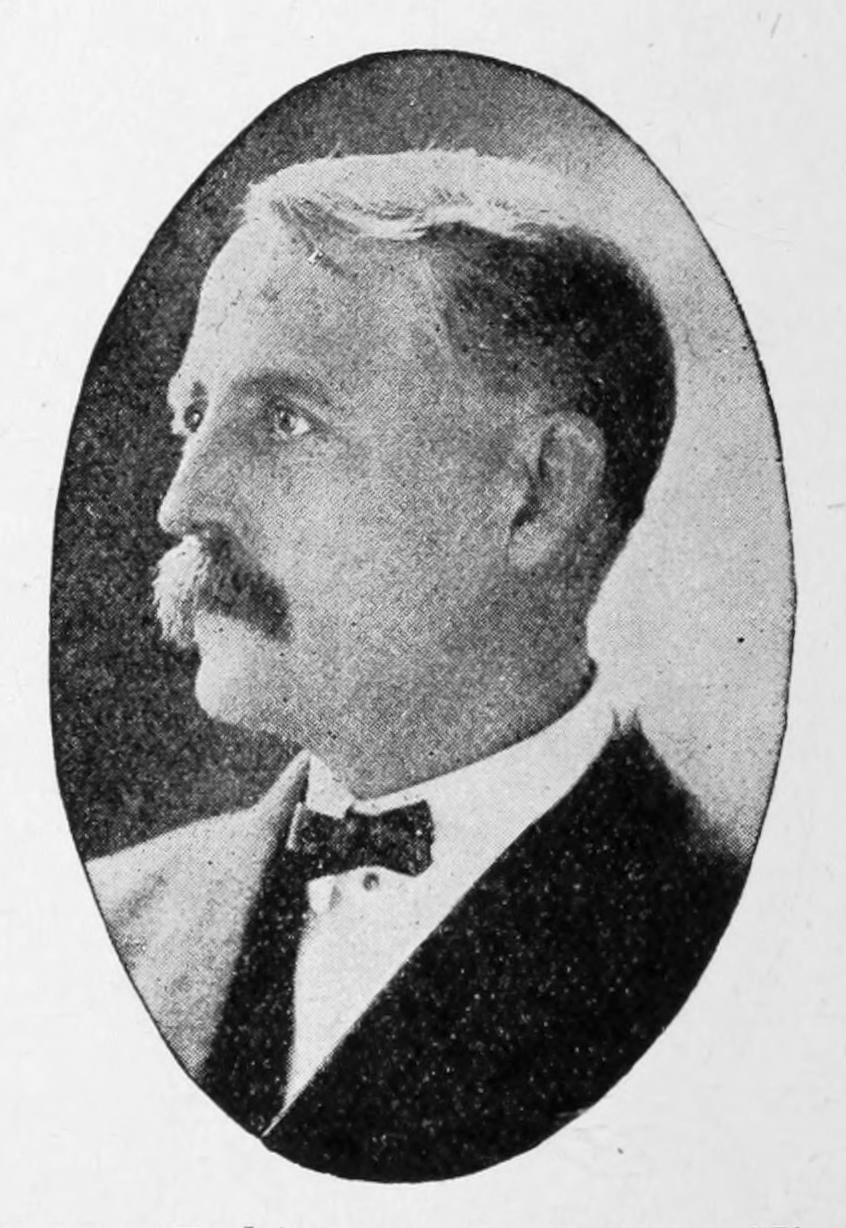
- Robinson c. 1915
- Born: Jonah LeRoy Robinson; October 19, 1856; Sparta, Wisconsin, U.S.
- Died: November 27, 1946 (aged 90); Pierre, South Dakota, U.S.
- Occupation: Historian
- Known for: Original idea for Mount Rushmore

Jonah LeRoy "Doane" Robinson (October 19, 1856 – November 27, 1946) was an American historian who was the state historian of South Dakota. He is known for conceiving of the idea for the Mount Rushmore National Memorial in the Black Hills, which he believed would stimulate tourism to the area.

Doane Robinson had introduced a bill to the South Dakota Legislature asking for permission and funds to scout a location for a massive carvings project; the sculpture was to include the Sioux Nation chief as well as local famous South Dakotans. While denied funding, he was granted permission to look for an area.

He had initially suggested a well-known area of the Black Hills, Needles, named after large distinct eroded granite pillars.

Early on, Robinson originally wrote Lorado Taft about the project idea and potential Needles location. At the time Taft was quite ill and unable to attend any expedition to survey the area.

Not giving up, in September 1924 Robinson met with Gutzon Borglum, writing Borglum about the potential project. During Robinson and Borglum's first expedition to the Needles, Borglum declared his dislike of Robinson's proposed location because of the soft rock and controversy attached to it by the Lakota Nation.

In August 1925, Borglum had made a second trip to South Dakota and declared Mount Rushmore would be the site of this grand Sculpture project. Doane Robinson, then 69 years old, joined an expedition party in scaling the mountain. He became the de facto project manager of the Rushmore Memorial from that point on.

Robinson gained support from then US Senator, Peter Norbeck from South Dakota, and in 1929, during the last months of his presidency, President Calvin Coolidge approved the project after Congress authorized funding. The project was completed in 1941. Doane Robinson lived to 1946, seeing his idea fully completed.

== Early life ==
Jonah LeRoy Robinson was born in Sparta, Wisconsin. His sister could not pronounce his name and called him "Doane" when young, and he continued to use this name throughout his life. Robinson first became a farmer in Minnesota. He soon abandoned that work to become a lawyer, reading law with an established firm to prepare for the bar.

He moved to South Dakota, where he set up his practice in Pierre, the state capital. Later, he took interest in history, and began to publish work about South Dakota history. He was eventually appointed as South Dakota's state historian. In that position, Robinson conceived the idea of the Mount Rushmore monument to attract tourism to the Black Hills area.

== Mount Rushmore ==
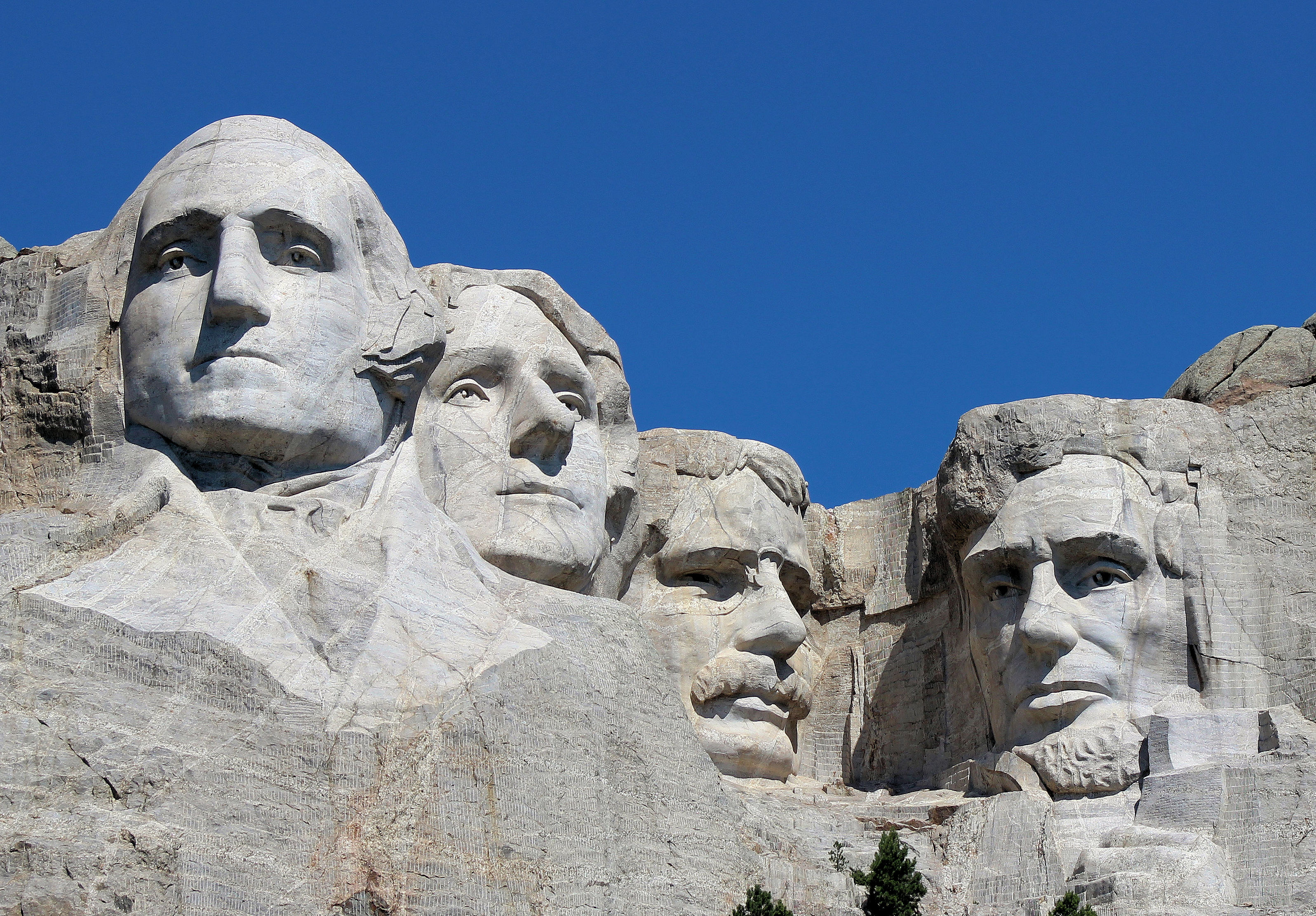
Robinson conceived the idea for Mount Rushmore.

After reading about Stone Mountain near Atlanta, Georgia, Robinson was inspired to create a sculpture project at the Needles, to have several granite pillars carved as likenesses of famous people. He hoped that such a sculpture would attract greater tourism to South Dakota. After failing to contact sculptor Lorado Taft, who was ill, Robinson gained the support of Gutzon Borglum. His concept was also backed by US Senator Peter Norbeck from South Dakota.

Robinson began efforts to raise funds for the project and to receive permission to carve the Needles. The funds were denied, and many groups disliked the idea, including the Lakota people (Sioux), who considered the Black Hills to be sacred ground. Environmentalist Cora Johnson of the Hot Springs Star newspaper believed that such a carving would destroy the natural landscape.

On Borglum's second meeting with Robinson, the sculptor recommended changing the location for the sculpture project from the Needles to Mount Rushmore. Borglum also decided that the sculptures should have a larger national focus, and he selected four presidents representing different elements and eras of United States history.

In 1929, president Calvin Coolidge finally signed a bill passed by Congress, which created a commission to oversee the sculpting. Robinson was not appointed as a member of the commission, which greatly disappointed him.

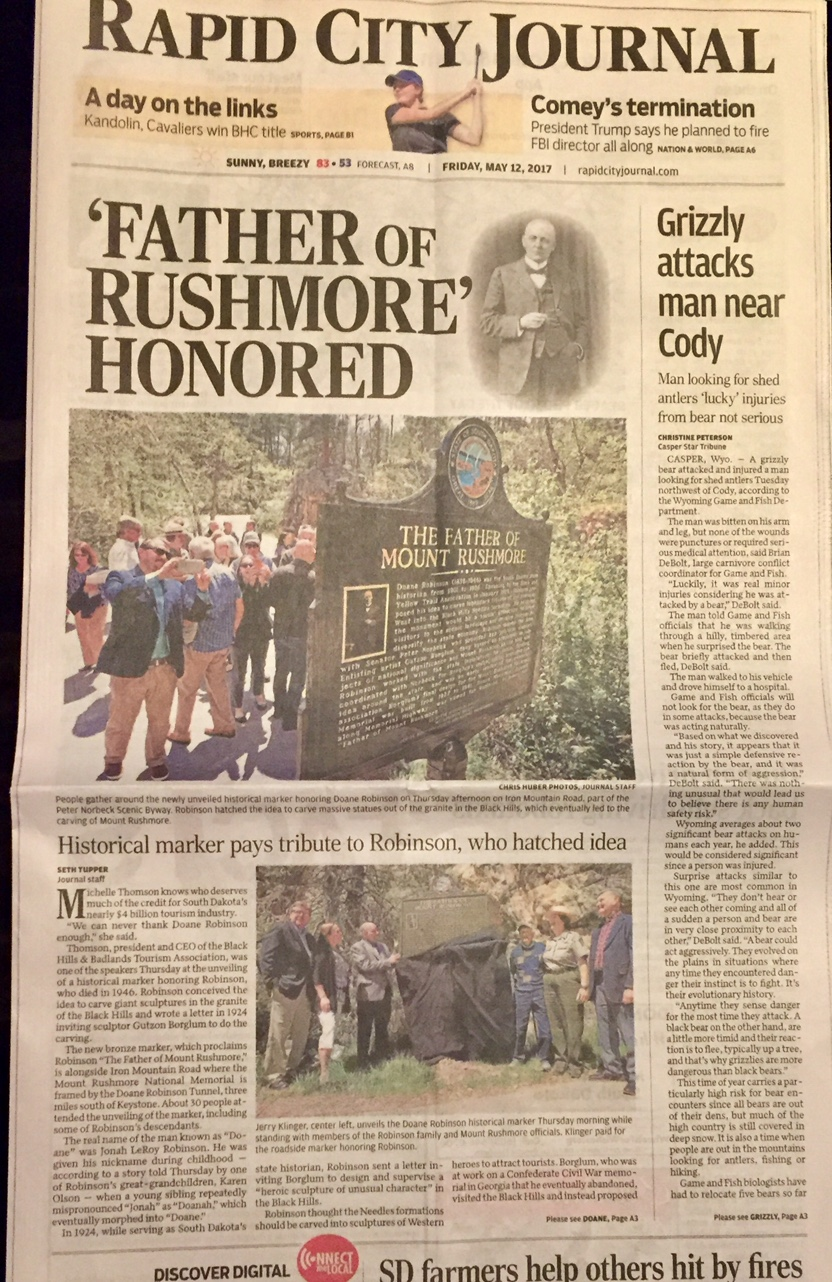
Rapid City Journal - Father of Rushmore Honored

Following his retirement as state historian, Robinson returned to farming. He lived to see the completion of the Mount Rushmore project in 1941, to the extent allowed by funding. He died on November 27, 1946, at age 90, in Pierre, South Dakota.

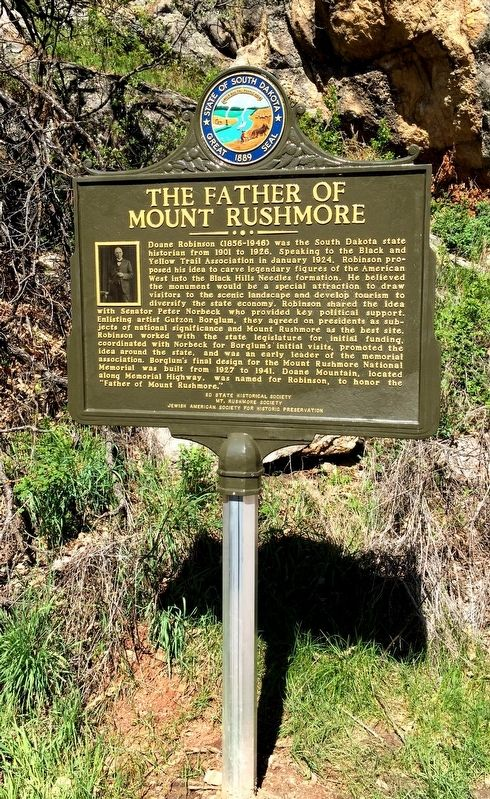
Doane Robinson - the Father of Mt. Rushmore

== Legacy ==
In addition to the Mount Rushmore project, Robinson was recognized by the naming of Doane Mountain in his honor. Located south of Mount Rushmore, it was the site for the headquarters of the project. Robinson was a devout Congregationalist.

== Publications ==
- History of South Dakota
- A History of the Dakota or Sioux Indians from their earliest traditions and first contact with white men to the final settlement of the last of them upon reservations and consequent abandonment of the old tribal life
- A Brief History of South Dakota, New York: American Book Company, 1905.
- Doane Robinson's Encyclopedia of South Dakota
