= Mount Rushmore =

Mountain with U.S. presidential sculptures

Mount Rushmore National Memorial Shrine of Democracy Tȟuŋkášila Šákpe Pahá
- View of Mount Rushmore, showing Gutzon Borglum's sculpted heads of George Washington, Thomas Jefferson, Theodore Roosevelt and Abraham Lincoln

- Location within the United States Location within South Dakota
- Location: Pennington County, South Dakota
- Nearest city: Keystone, South Dakota
- Coordinates: 43°52′44″N 103°27′33″W
- Area: 1,278 acres (5.17 km^{2})
- Elevation: 5,725 feet (1,745 m) AMSL
- Authorized: March 3, 1925; 101 years ago
- Visitors: 2,440,449 (in 2022)
- Governing body: National Park Service
- Website: www.nps.gov/moru
- Mount Rushmore National Memorial
- U.S. National Register of Historic Places
- U.S. Historic district
- Built: 1927–1941
- Architects: Gutzon Borglum and Lincoln Borglum
- NRHP reference No.: 66000718
- Added to NRHP: October 15, 1966; 60 years ago

The Mount Rushmore National Memorial is a national memorial featuring a colossal sculpture carved into the granite face of Mount Rushmore (Lakota: Tȟuŋkášila Šákpe Pahá, or Six Grandfathers Mountain) in the Black Hills, about 2 mi (3 km) southwest of Keystone, South Dakota, United States. The sculptor, Gutzon Borglum, named it the Shrine of Democracy, and oversaw the execution from 1927 to 1941 with the help of his son, Lincoln Borglum. The sculpture features 60-foot-tall (18 m) depictions of the heads of four United States presidents: George Washington, Thomas Jefferson, Theodore Roosevelt, and Abraham Lincoln, respectively chosen to represent the nation's foundation, expansion, development, and preservation. Mount Rushmore attracts more than two million visitors annually to the memorial park which covers 1,278 acres (2.00 sq mi; 517 hectares).

Mount Rushmore is 3.7 mi (6.0 km) east-northeast of the summit of Black Elk Peak (formerly Harney Peak), the highest point in the Black Hills. Mount Rushmore is considered part of the Black Elk Range (formerly the Harney Range) in treatments that distinguish that subrange of the Black Hills. Its elevation at its highest point is 5,725 feet (1,745 m) above sea level.

Borglum chose Mount Rushmore in part because of its southeast-facing direction and maximum exposure to sunlight. The carving was the idea of Doane Robinson, South Dakota's state historian. Robinson originally wanted the sculpture to feature American West heroes, such as Lewis and Clark, their expedition guide Sacagawea, Oglala Lakota chief Red Cloud, Buffalo Bill Cody, and Oglala Lakota chief Crazy Horse. Borglum, arguing that the sculpture should be national in scope rather than regional, convinced them to choose the four presidents instead.

Peter Norbeck, U.S. senator from South Dakota, sponsored the project and secured federal funding. Construction began in 1927 and the presidents' faces were completed between 1934 and 1939. After Gutzon Borglum died in March 1941, his son Lincoln took over as leader of the construction project. Each president was originally to be depicted from head to waist, but lack of funding forced construction to end on October 31, 1941, and only Washington's sculpture includes any detail below chin level.

The sculpture at Mount Rushmore was built on land that was taken from the Sioux Nation in the 1870s. In 1980, the U.S. Supreme Court ruled in United States v. Sioux Nation of Indians that the taking of the Black Hills required just compensation and awarded the tribe $102 million. The Sioux have refused the money, and continue to demand return of the land. This conflict continues, leading some critics of the monument to refer to it as a "Shrine of Hypocrisy".

== History ==
=== Early history and naming ===
The peak that would later be known as Mount Rushmore is situated in the Black Hills, which has been inhabited by numerous indigenous groups over the centuries. The Ponca, Arikara, and Mandan were among the earliest recorded inhabitants, and were later displaced by the Kiowa, Plains Apache, and Shoshone. By 1800 those groups were supplanted by the Cheyenne, Arapaho, and Lakota Sioux, with the Lakota becoming the majority in the area by 1850. The Lakota call the Black Hills Pahá Sápa and consider the entire region to be sacred ground, referring to the hills as wamakaognaka e'cante, "the heart of everything that is". The Cheyenne, Arapaho, and other Native groups of the Northern Plains also recognize particular sites within the Black Hills as having sacred significance.

Mount Rushmore was originally known to the Lakota as Igmu Tanka Pahá (Cougar Mountain) due to the many cougars living in the area. After the 1870s, it came to be known as Tȟuŋkášila Šákpe Pahá (Six Grandfathers Mountain). The name referred to the six head-like knobs along the summit ridge, which came to be associated with Black Elk’s 1873 "Great Vision" of the Six Grandfathers. The Six Grandfathers are the spirits of the six directions (the four cardinal directions, plus above and below) in Lakota cosmology.

The United States government recognized the Black Hills as the exclusive territory of the Lakota in both the First and Second Treaty of Fort Laramie (1851 and 1868, respectively), creating the Great Sioux Reservation in which the Black Hills were situated. U.S. general George Armstrong Custer summited Black Elk Peak a few years later in 1874 during the Black Hills Expedition, which triggered the Black Hills Gold Rush and Great Sioux War of 1876. In 1877, the U.S. broke the Treaty of Fort Laramie and asserted control over the area, leading to an influx of settlers and prospectors.

Early English-language names for the later Mount Rushmore included "Cougar Mountain," "Sugarloaf Mountain," "Slaughterhouse Mountain," and "Keystone Cliffs". Among the early prospectors in the area was New York mining promoter James Wilson, who organized the Harney Peak Tin Company, and hired New York attorney Charles E. Rushmore to visit the Black Hills and confirm the company's land claims. Rushmore visited the area on three or four trips over the span of 1884 and 1885. During one of these visits, Rushmore was traveling near the base of the peak and, impressed with it, asked his guide, Bill Challis, the mountain's name; Challis replied that the mountain did not have a name, but that it would henceforth be named after Rushmore. The name "Mount Rushmore" continued to be used locally, and was officially recognized by the United States Board of Geographic Names in June 1930.

=== Concept, design and funding ===
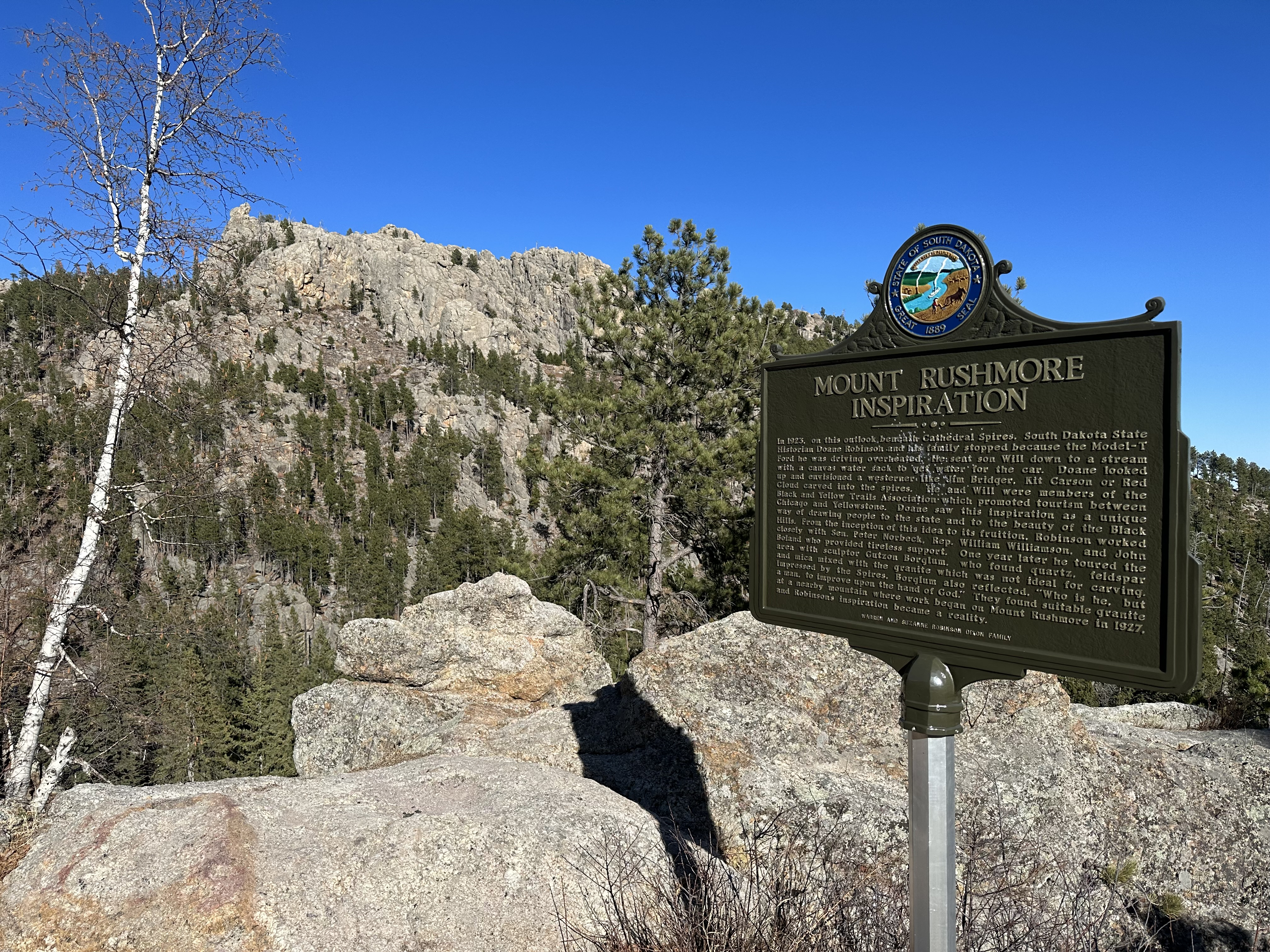
Doane Robinson was inspired by this view on the Needles Highway to create the sculpture, though this location was ultimately not chosen

By the 1920s, South Dakota had become a U.S. state and was a popular destination for automobile travelers visiting the Black Hills National Forest, Wind Cave National Park, and Needles Highway. In 1923, the Secretary of the South Dakota State Historical Society, Doane Robinson, who would later come to be known as the "Father of Mount Rushmore", sought to boost tourism to South Dakota through the construction of a large monument in the Black Hills. Robinson initially approached sculptor Lorado Taft, but Taft was ill at the time and uninterested in Robinson's project. Robinson next sought the help of then-U.S. Senator Peter Norbeck, who had established Custer State Park when he was Governor in 1919. Norbeck cautiously supported Robinson's plan, and Robinson began campaigning for it publicly. The Sioux Falls Argus Leader was also an early proponent of Robinson's plan.

In 1924, Robinson read about the Confederate memorial at Stone Mountain, Georgia, that had been underway since 1915. On August 20, 1924, Robinson wrote to Gutzon Borglum, the sculptor of the Stone Mountain memorial, asking him to travel to the Black Hills region to determine whether the carving could be accomplished. Borglum had been having disagreements with the Stone Mountain Memorial Association, and on September 24, 1924, travelled to South Dakota to meet Robinson.

Robinson's plan had some support in South Dakota, but opposition was particularly strong in the Black Hills area. Many people there opposed the project on conservationist grounds, wishing to leave the appearance of the area unaltered. Many others opposed it because they did not want an influx of tourism to the area. Cora Babbitt Johnson, editor of the Hot Springs, South Dakota newspaper, the Hot Springs Star, was particularly outspoken in her opposition to the planned sculptures. Others opposed to the plan included the Black Hills Federation of Women's Clubs and the Yankton Daily Press & Dakotan. Through 1924, predominant opinion in South Dakota was either opposed or indifferent to the memorial project, and it was only through considerable lobbying on the part of Robinson and Borglum that the project began to gain support in early 1925. South Dakota Governor Carl Gunderson also leaned toward opposition to the project, but informed Senator Norbeck that he would not actively oppose it.

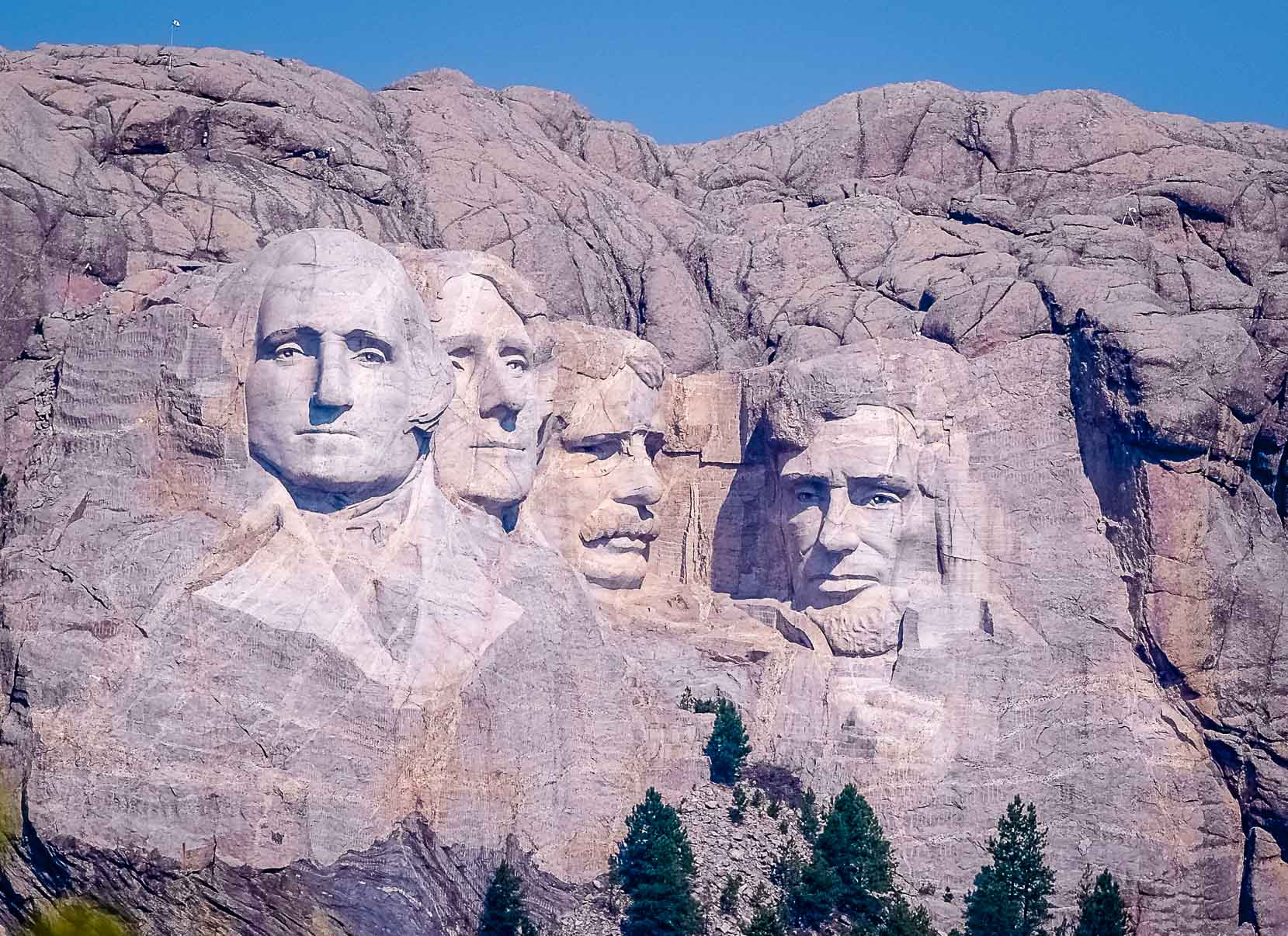
The completed sculpture

Although many Lakota and other Native Americans later came to oppose the Mount Rushmore sculptures as a desecration of their sacred land during the modern era of the Native American civil rights movement, Native groups did not openly protest the monument at the time of its planning and construction. Indeed, Black Elk visited the site in 1936 while it was still under construction.

The press reported a later, March 7, 1925, conference between Norbeck and Borglum, with specific mention of the Washington-Lincoln design and the use of Mount Harney (now Black Elk Peak). Borglum was formally offered the project, but said he would withhold his decision until conflicts with the Stone Mountain Memorial Association were settled.

Borglum's original plan was to make the carvings in 490-foot-high (150 m) granite pillars known as "The Needles" (Hiŋháŋ Káǧa). The Needles were an established area landmark, being a centerpiece of Custer State Park and the scenic Needles Highway. The proposal to turn the Needles into sculptures had aroused some of the strongest opposition to the project, and the idea was abandoned in order to assuage opposition. (It was later noted that the Needles would have been too small and unstable to support carving on the scale that Borglum wished to carry out.) In August 1925, Borglum set out on an expedition in the area of Harney Peak to scout for a final location for the monument. On seeing Mount Rushmore, he is reported to have said, "America will march along that skyline." He chose Mount Rushmore, a more imposing location than The Needles, partly because it faced southward and received maximum sun exposure.

Borglum rejected Robinson's original plan of depicting characters from the Old West, such as Lewis and Clark, Red Cloud, Sacagawea, John C. Fremont, and Crazy Horse, and instead decided to depict four U.S. presidents: George Washington, Thomas Jefferson, Abraham Lincoln, and Theodore Roosevelt. The four presidential faces were said to be carved into the granite with the intention of symbolizing "an accomplishment born, planned, and created in the minds and by the hands of Americans for Americans".

Senator Norbeck and Congressman William Williamson of South Dakota introduced bills in early 1925 for permission to use federal land, which passed easily. South Dakota legislation had less support, only passing narrowly on its third attempt, which Governor Gunderson signed into law on March 5, 1925. The approval came without any allocated funds, however, leaving the project to be financed by private sources. Private funding came slowly, and Borglum invited President Calvin Coolidge to the dedication ceremony, at which he promised federal funding. The dedication ceremony was held on August 10, 1927, and carving of the sculpture got underway on October 4. The Mount Rushmore National Memorial Act, which authorized up to $250,000 in matching funds, was introduced to Congress in 1928 and signed into law by Coolidge on February 25, 1929, just before leaving office. The 1929 presidential transition to Herbert Hoover delayed funding until an initial federal match of $54,670.56 was acquired.

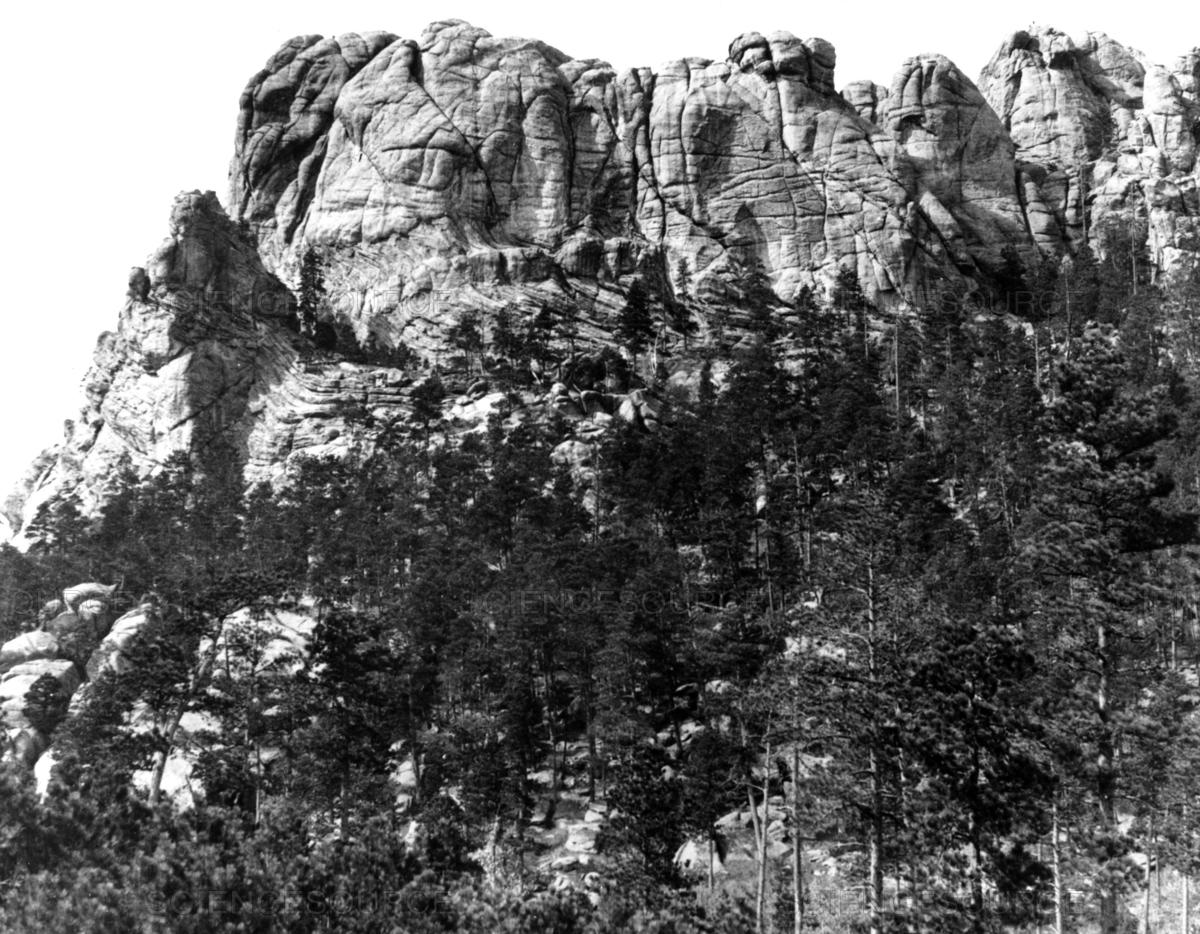
Mount Rushmore (Six Grandfathers) before construction, c. 1905

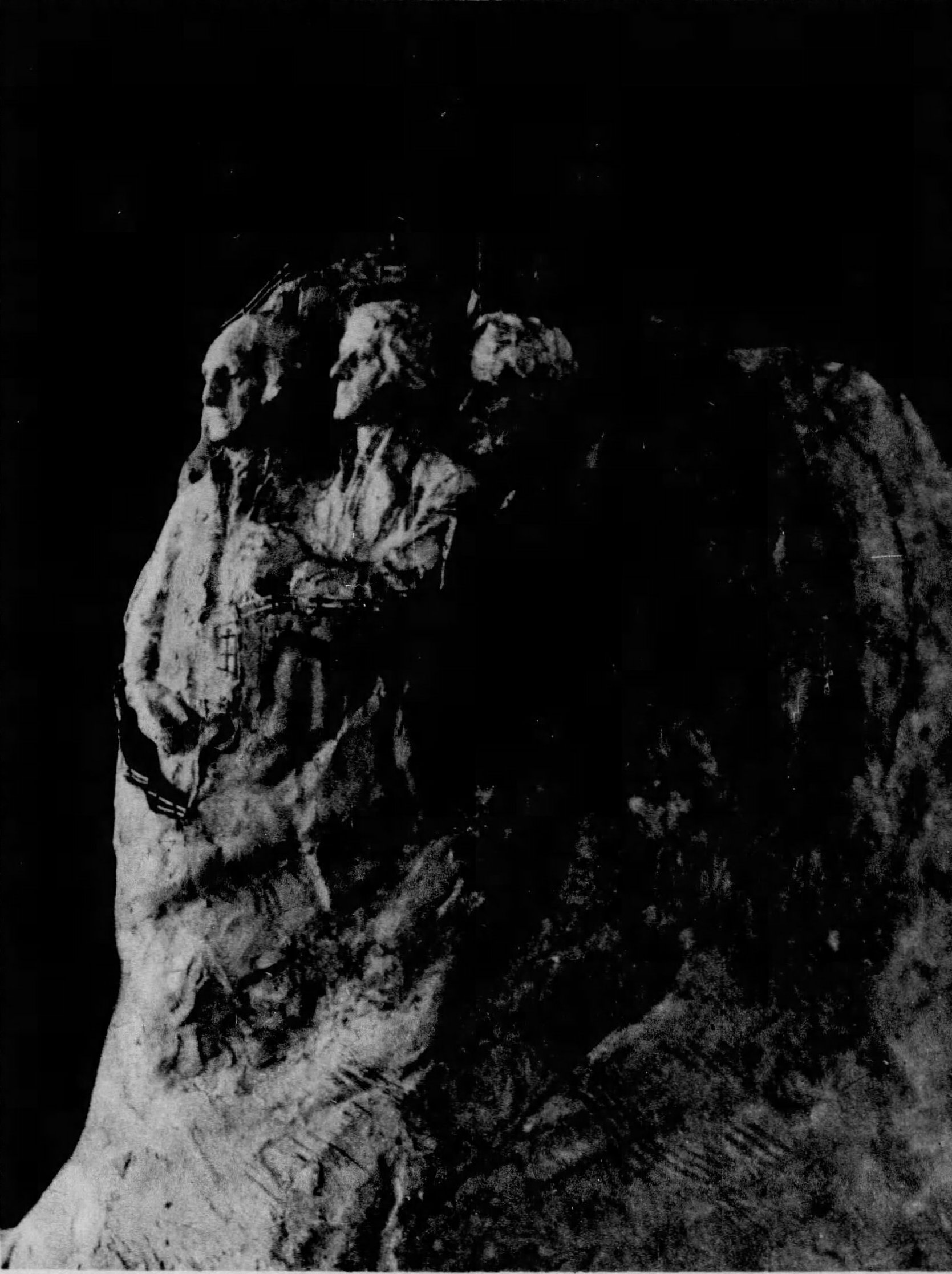
Early model of the design

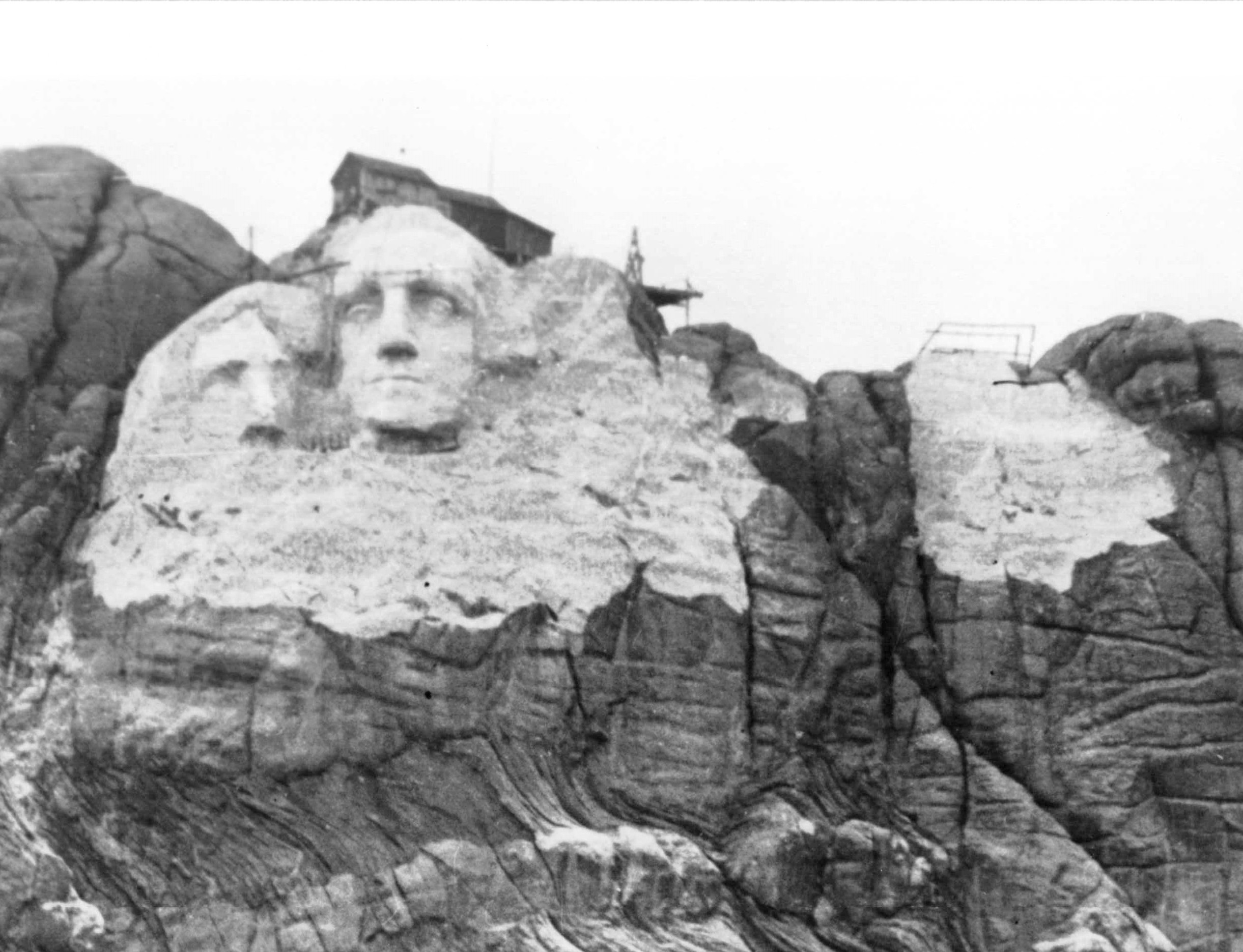
Construction underway, with Jefferson leftmost, before unstable rock necessitated a design change

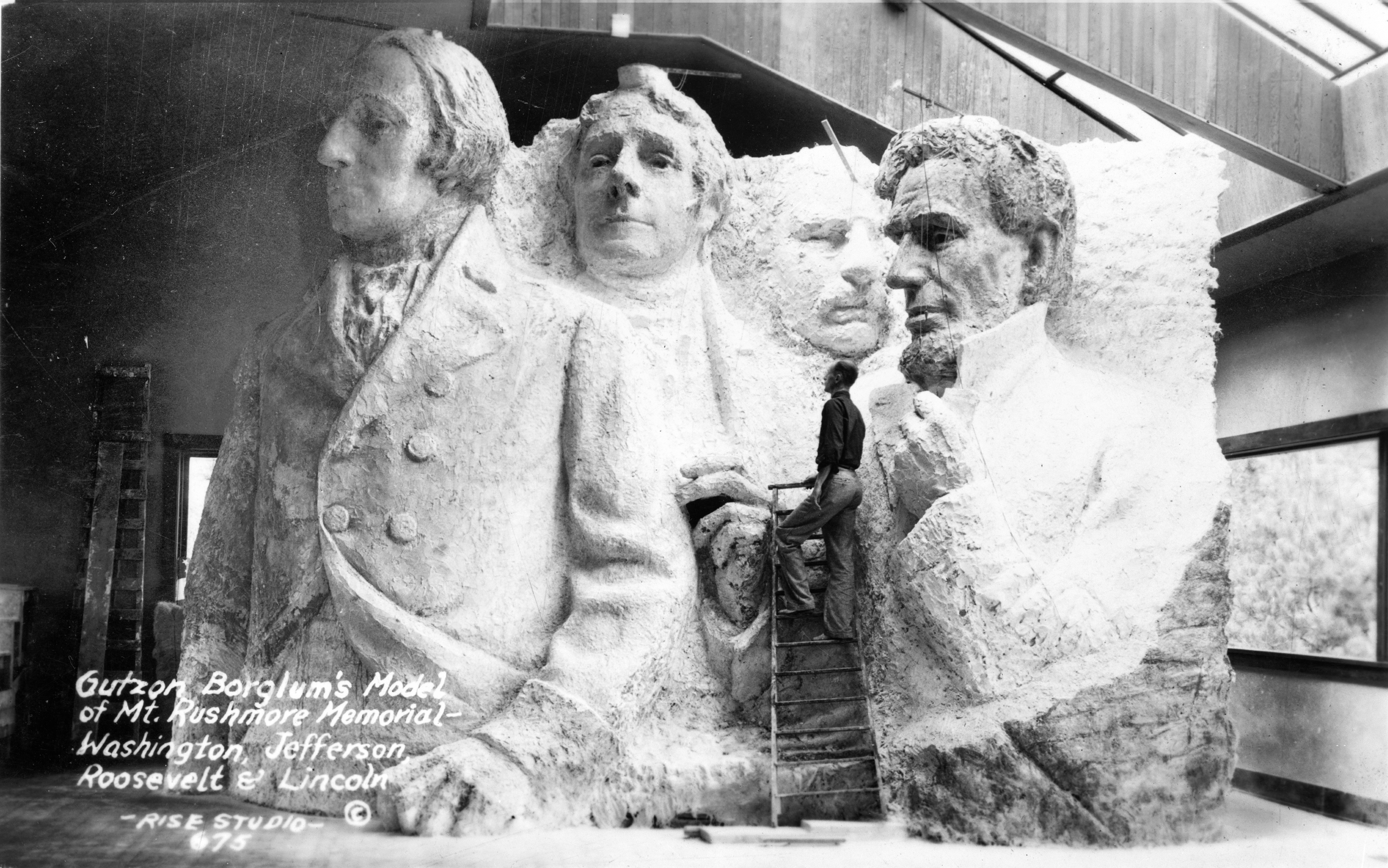
Original mockup of the Mount Rushmore sculpture "before funding ran out"

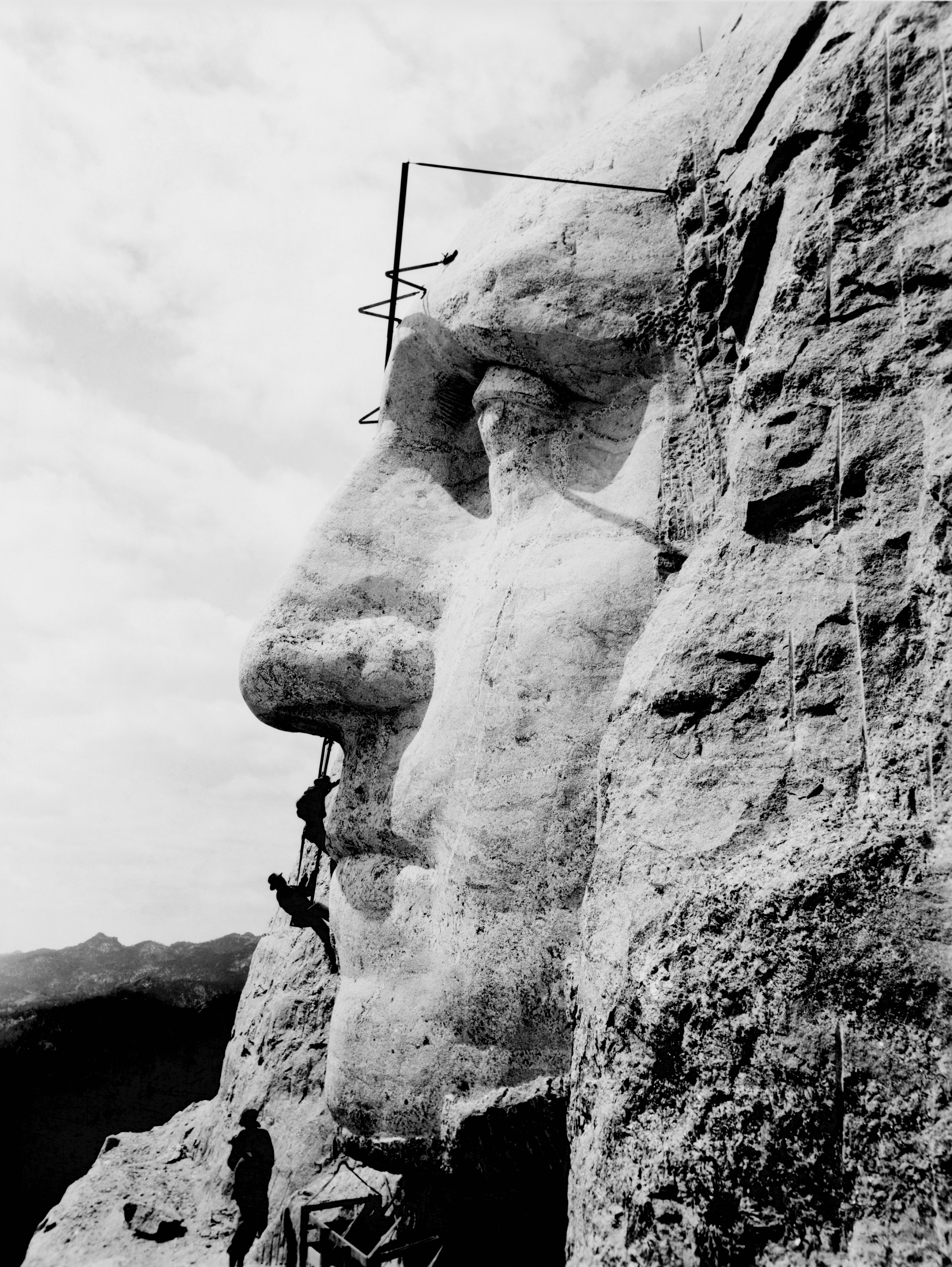
Construction of George Washington's likeness

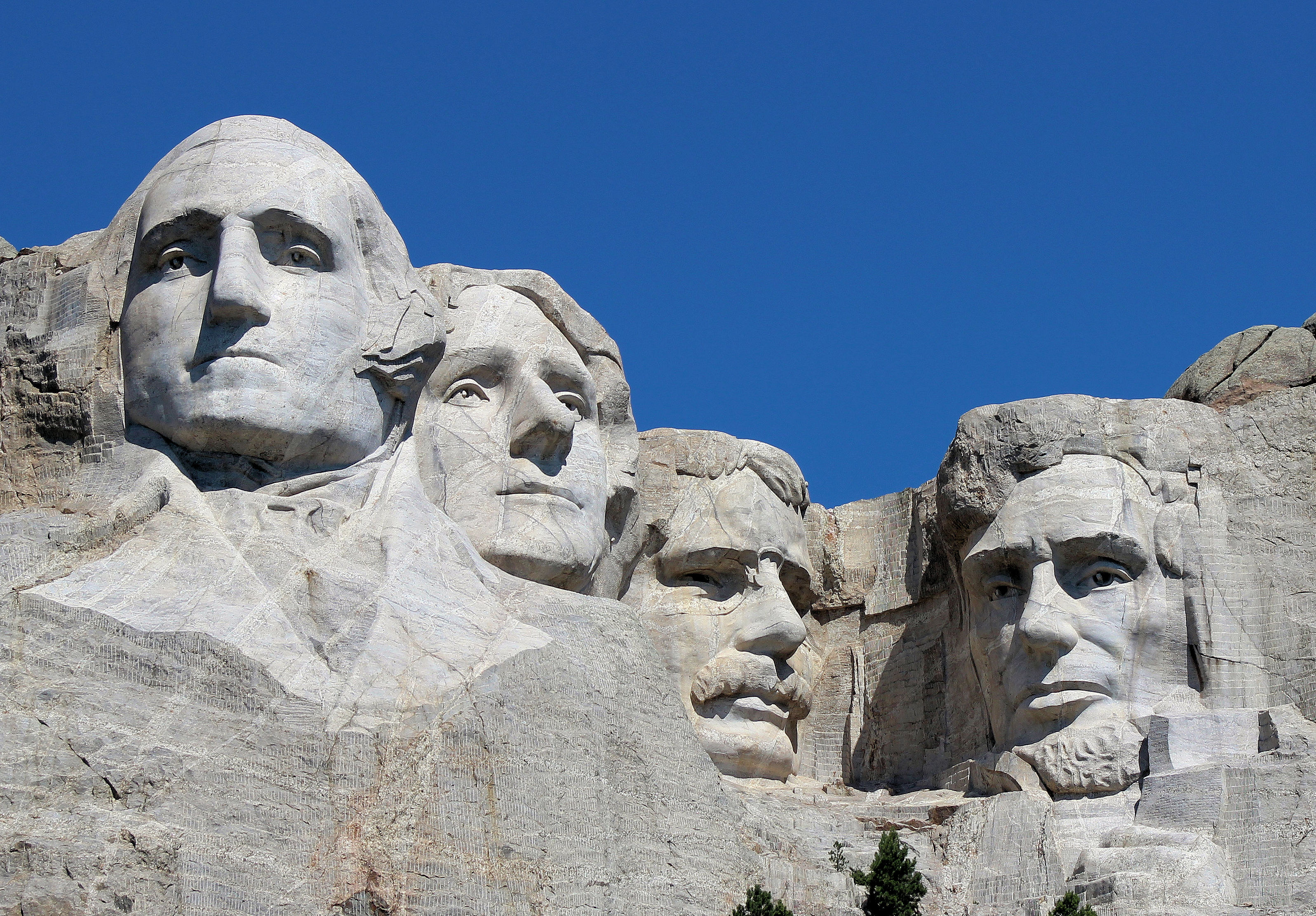
Close-up view of the final sculptures

=== Construction ===
Between October 4, 1927, and October 31, 1941, Gutzon Borglum and 400 workers sculpted the colossal 60-foot-high (18 m) carvings of United States presidents George Washington, Thomas Jefferson, Theodore Roosevelt, and Abraham Lincoln to represent the first 150 years of American history. These presidents were selected by Borglum because of their role in preserving the Republic and expanding its territory. The carving of Mount Rushmore involved the use of dynamite, followed by the process of "honeycombing", where workers drilled closely spaced holes, allowing small pieces of rock to be removed by hand. In total, about 450,000 short tons (410,000 t) of rock were blasted off the mountainside. The project was completed without a single fatality. The image of Thomas Jefferson was originally intended to appear to the left of Washington, but after work there was begun, the rock was found to be unsuitable, so the work on Jefferson's figure was dynamited, and a new figure was sculpted to the right.

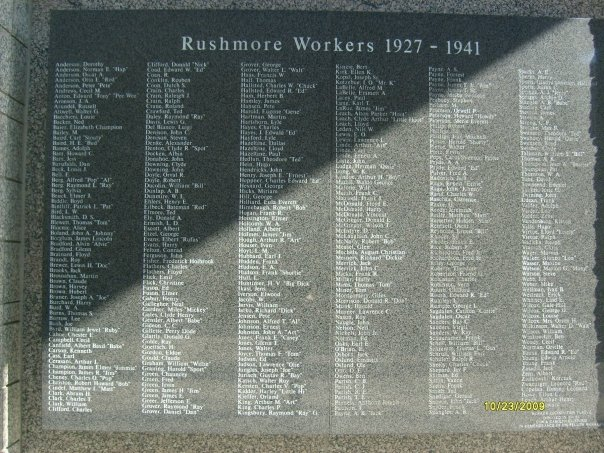
Plaque at Mount Rushmore National Monument with names of monument workers

The chief carver of the mountain was Luigi Del Bianco, an artisan and stonemason who emigrated to the U.S. from Friuli in Italy and was chosen to work on this project because of his understanding of sculptural language and ability to convey emotion in the carved portraits.

In 1933, the National Park Service took Mount Rushmore under its jurisdiction. Julian Spotts helped with the project by improving its infrastructure. For example, he had the tram upgraded so it could reach the top of Mount Rushmore to improve access for workers. By July 4, 1934, Washington's face had been completed and was dedicated. The face of Thomas Jefferson was dedicated in 1936, and Abraham Lincoln's on September 17, 1937. In 1937, a bill was introduced in Congress to add the head of civil-rights leader Susan B. Anthony, but a rider was passed on an appropriations bill requiring that federal funds be used to finish only those heads that had already been started at that time. In 1939, the face of Theodore Roosevelt was dedicated.

The Sculptor's Studio – a display of unique plaster models and tools related to the sculpting – was built in 1939 under the direction of Borglum. Borglum died from an embolism in March 1941. His son, Lincoln Borglum, continued the project. Originally, the figures were intended to be carved from the head to the waist, but insufficient funding forced the carving to end. Borglum had also planned a massive panel in the shape of the Louisiana Purchase commemorating in eight-foot-tall (2.4 m) gilded letters the Declaration of Independence, U.S. Constitution, Louisiana Purchase, and seven other territorial acquisitions, from the Alaska Purchase to the Panama Canal Zone. In total, the entire project cost US$989,992.32 (equivalent to $21.7 million in 2025).

Nick Clifford, the last remaining carver, died in November 2019 at age 98.

=== Later developments ===
Harold Spitznagel and Cecil Doty designed the original visitor center, finished in 1957, as part of the Mission 66 effort to improve visitor facilities at national parks and monuments across the country. Ten years of redevelopment work culminated with the completion of extensive visitor facilities and sidewalks in 1998, such as a visitor center, the Lincoln Borglum Museum, and the Presidential Trail.

On October 15, 1966, Mount Rushmore was listed on the National Register of Historic Places. A 500-word essay giving the history of the United States by Nebraska student William Andrew Burkett was selected as the winner in the college-age group in a 1934 competition, and that essay was placed on the Entablature on a bronze plate in 1973.

Members of the American Indian Movement led an occupation of the monument in 1971, naming it "Mount Crazy Horse", and Lakota holy man John Fire Lame Deer planted a prayer staff on top of the mountain. Lame Deer said that the staff formed a symbolic shroud over the presidents' faces "which shall remain dirty until the treaties concerning the Black Hills are fulfilled."

In 1991, President George H. W. Bush officially dedicated Mount Rushmore National Memorial. In 2004, Gerard Baker was appointed superintendent of the park, the first and so far only Native American in that role. Baker stated that he would open up more "avenues of interpretation", and that the four presidents are "only one avenue and only one focus."

=== Crazy Horse Memorial ===
Construction on the Crazy Horse Memorial began in 1940 elsewhere in the Black Hills. It was conceived to commemorate the Native American leader while also serving as a response to Mount Rushmore. If completed it would be larger than Mount Rushmore. The Crazy Horse Memorial Foundation has rejected offers of federal funds. Its construction has the support of some Lakota chiefs, but it is the subject of controversy, even among Native American tribes.

== National Memorial site description ==
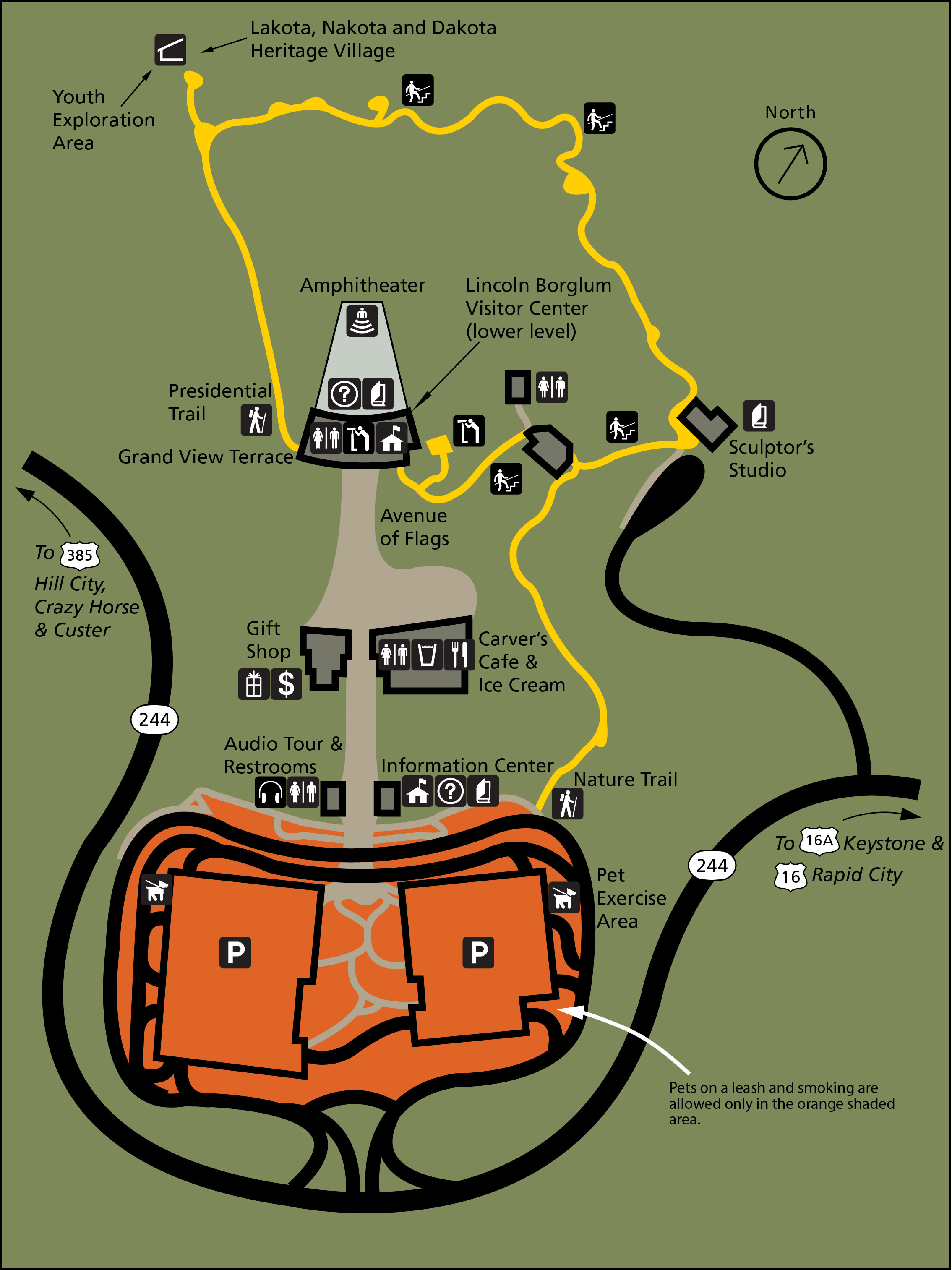
Map of central memorial area, Mount Rushmore National Memorial.

The 1,278-acre (517-hectare) site of Mount Rushmore National Memorial extends northward from the sculptures to include the entirety of Mount Rushmore and half of Old Baldy Mountain, and southward to Grizzly Bear Creek, where it borders on the Black Elk Wilderness and has a trail connection to the South Dakota Centennial Trail. The main road through the park is South Dakota Highway 244, which branches off of U.S. Route 16A near the eastern entrance to the park, beyond which lies the town of Keystone. The National Memorial is bounded by Black Hills National Forest on all sides.

Mount Rushmore National Memorial is centered on the monumental sculptures, which are faced by a building and terrace complex that is designed to optimize viewing of the sculptures. A broad walkway known as Avenue of Flags is situated between the main parking lot, the park shops, and the Grand View Terrace. The walkway was added during the 1976 United States Bicentennial and is lined with the flags of all 50 current states, as well as the District of Columbia, three territories, and two commonwealths, arranged in alphabetical order.

At the end of the Avenue of Flags lies the Grand View Terrace (added in 1998, along with the amphitheater), which is designed to offer a prime vantage point for the sculptures. The terrace is built atop the Lincoln Borglum Visitor Center, which serves as a museum housing exhibits on the history of Mount Rushmore and its construction and on the presidents depicted in the sculpture. A large amphitheater extends below the museum and terrace and offers a place for seated viewing of the sculptures, as well as ranger talks, and is the central point for the memorial's evening program.

The Presidential Trail is a 0.6-mile (1 km) loop trail that begins at and returns to the Visitor Center, and includes close views of the sculpture from the edge of Mount Rushmore's talus slope, as well as access to the Sculptor's Studio. The studio is connected to the Visitor Center by a series of long stairways (160 and 262 steps, respectively) with the Borglum Viewing Terrace between the two. The Sculptor's Studio, built in 1939, was Gutzon Borglum's second on-site studio. It was kept intact after the 1941 opening of the memorial to showcase Borglum's models, tools, and working effects and to house exhibits on the techniques used in build the sculptures.

An additional scenic viewpoint can be found farther away from the main memorial complex, to the west, along Highway 244. The spot is known as Profile View, and as the name suggests, offers a profile view of the sculptures. U.S. Route 16A, known locally as Iron Mountain Road, routes through the hills east of the park and offers more distant viewpoints at several key points along its route, such as the Doane Robinson Tunnel and Norbeck Overlook.

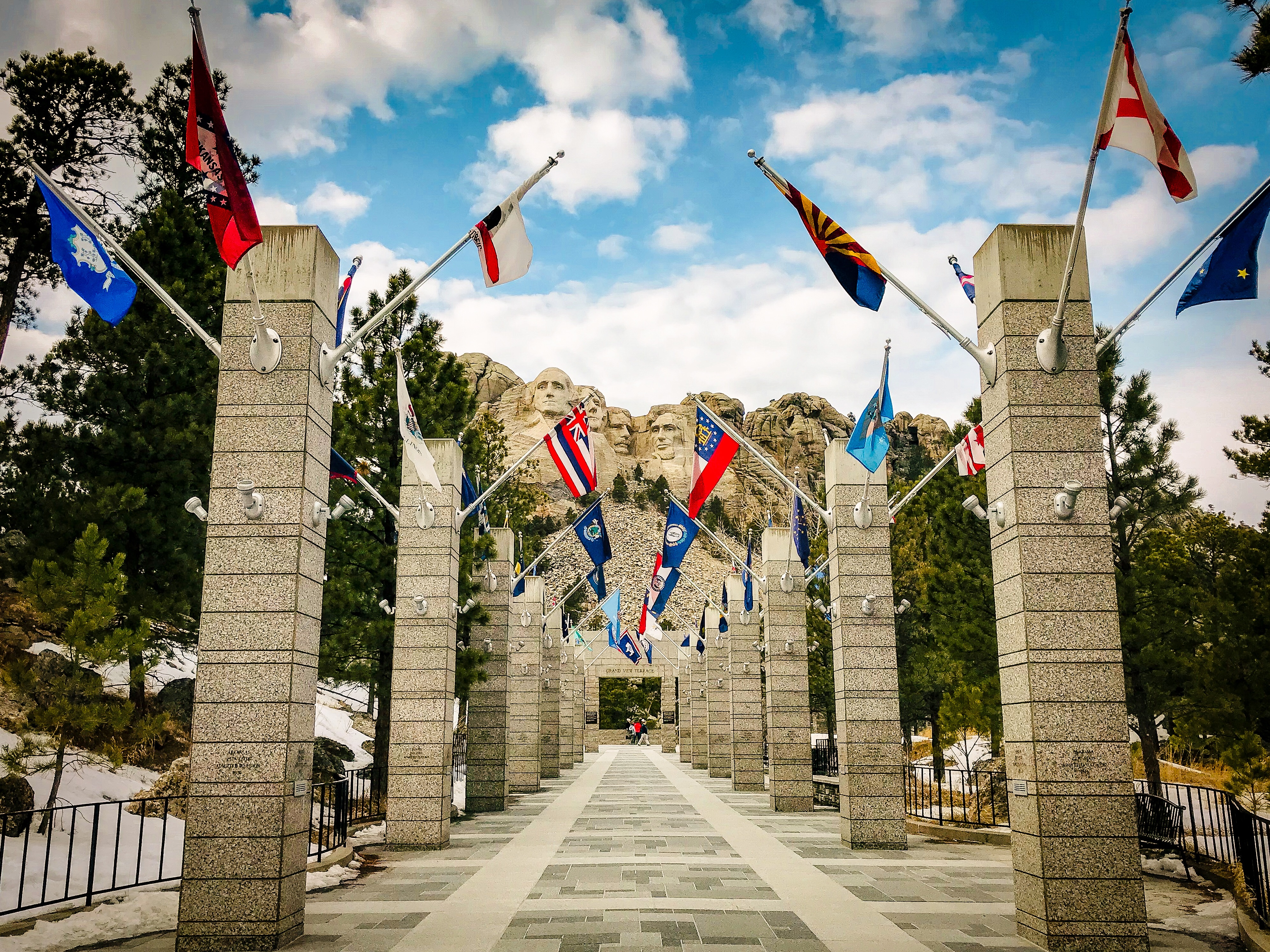
Avenue of Flags

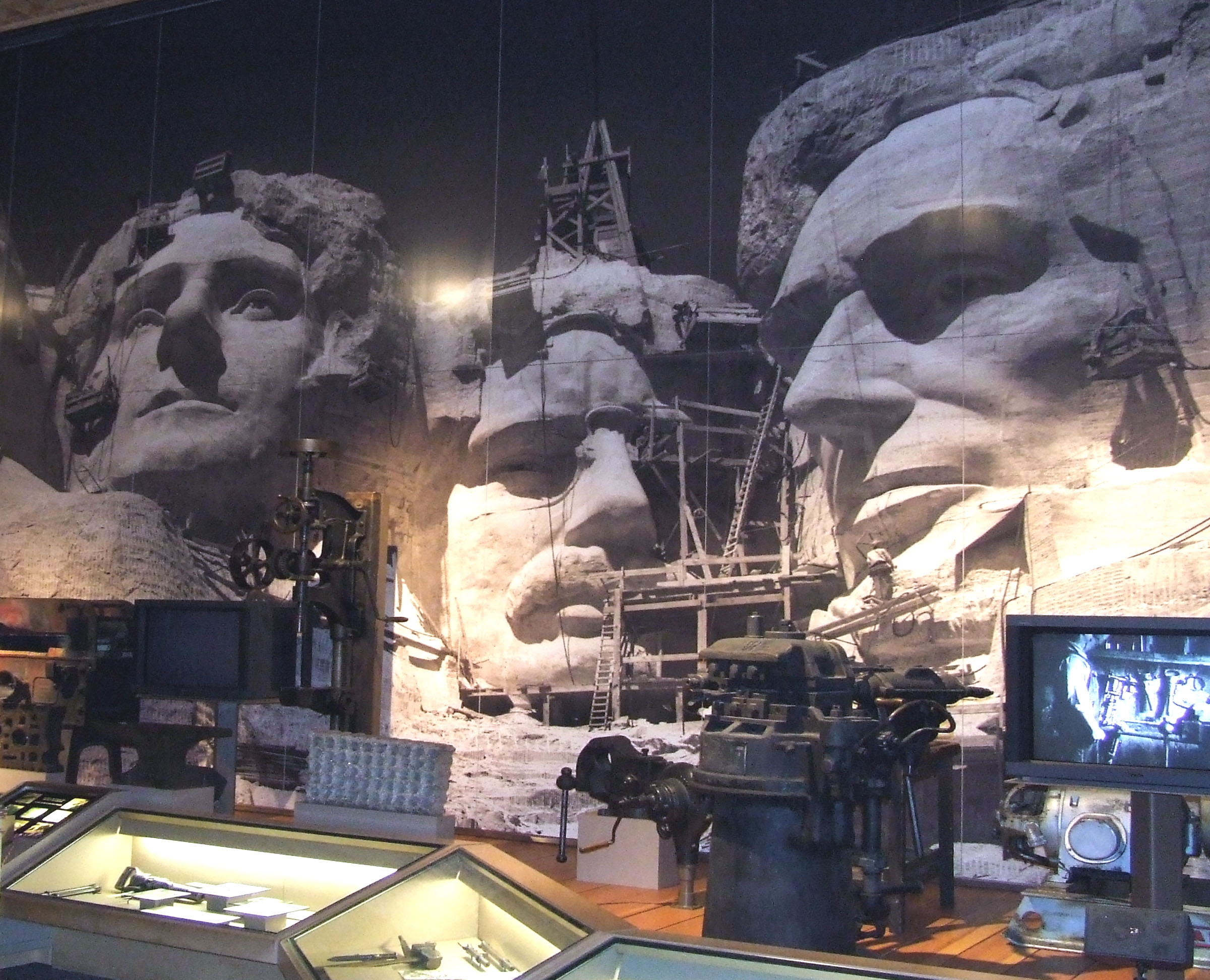
Exhibit, Borglum Visitor Center

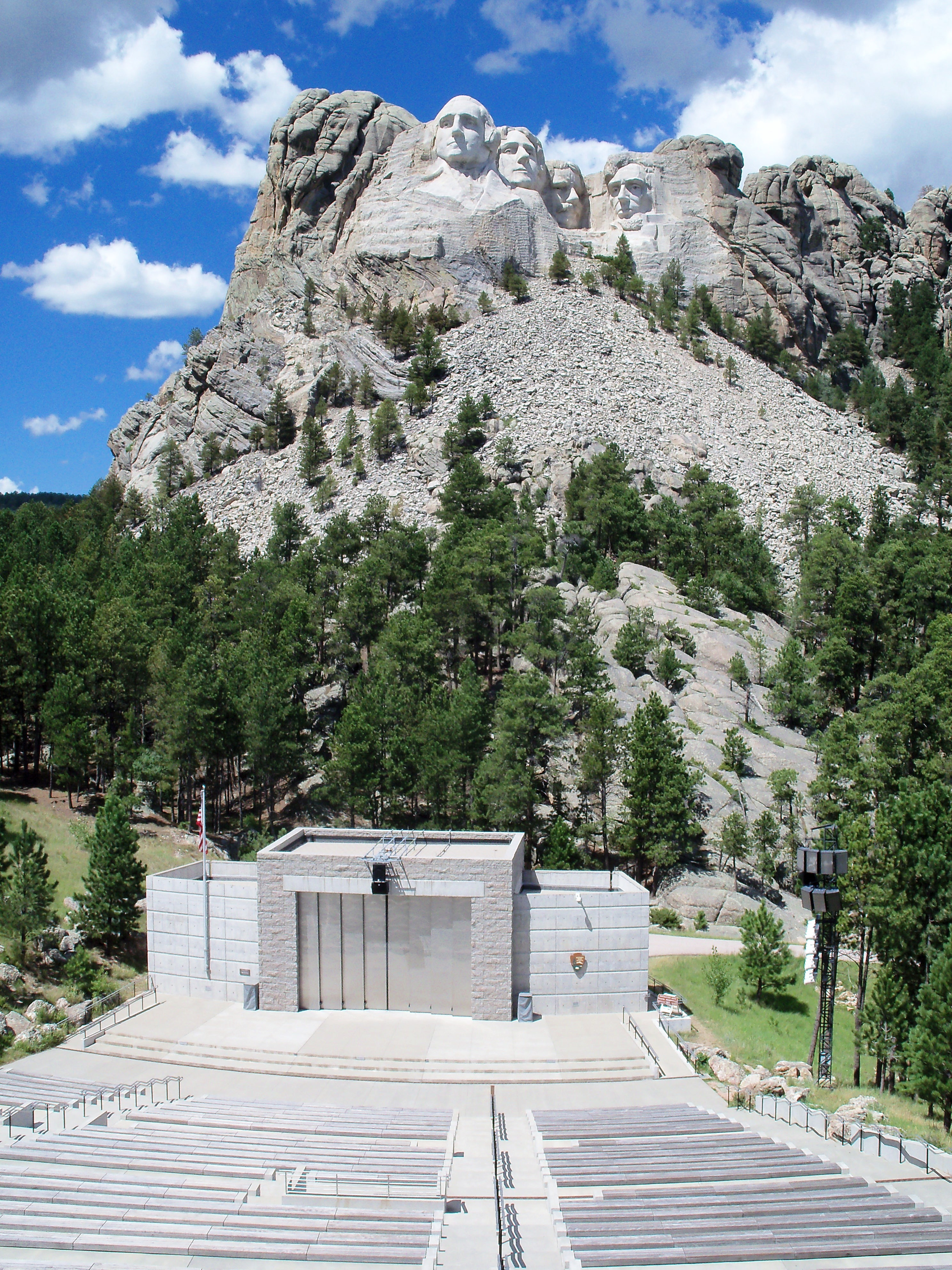
Amphitheater and sculptures

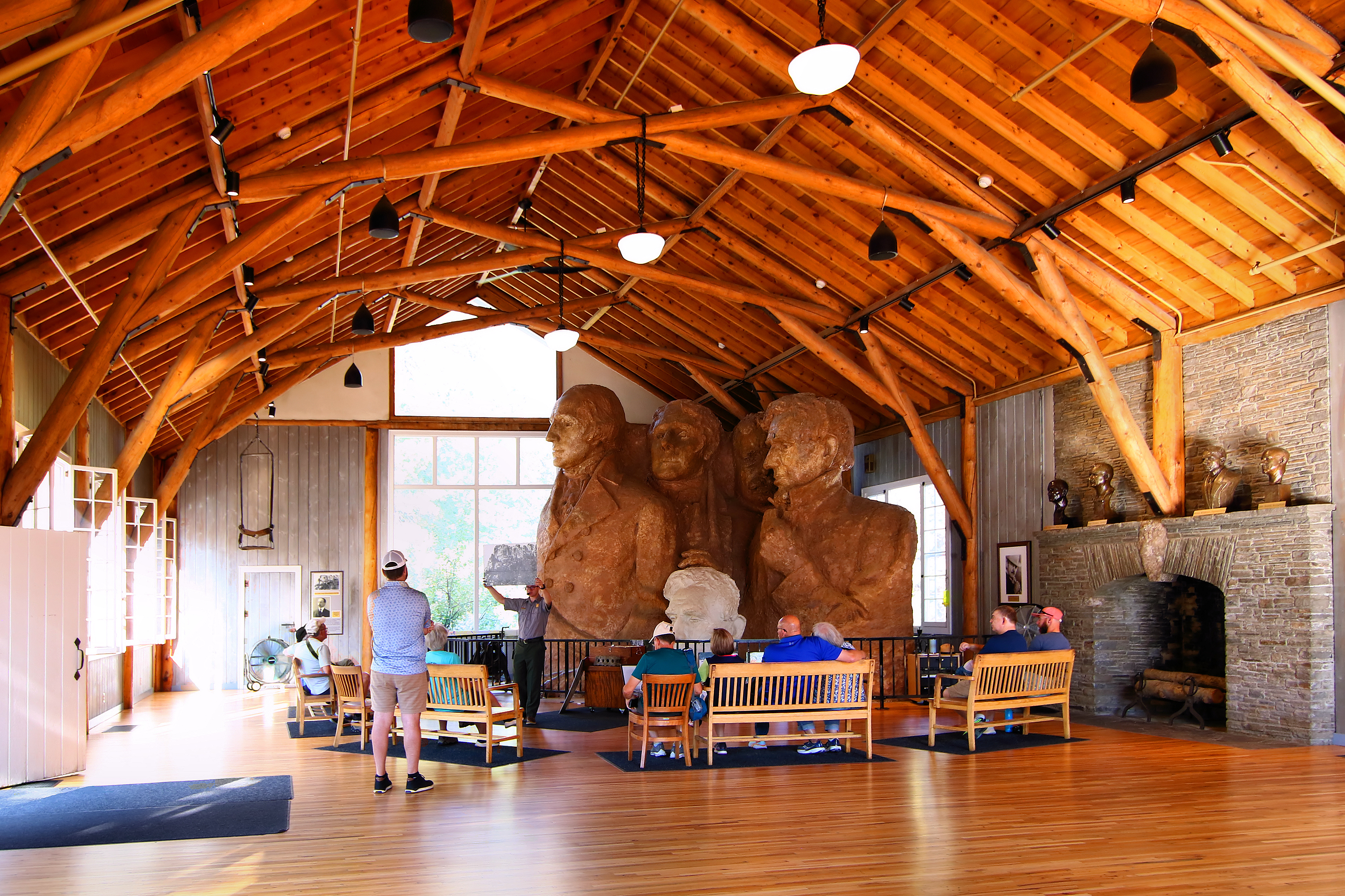
Sculptor's Studio

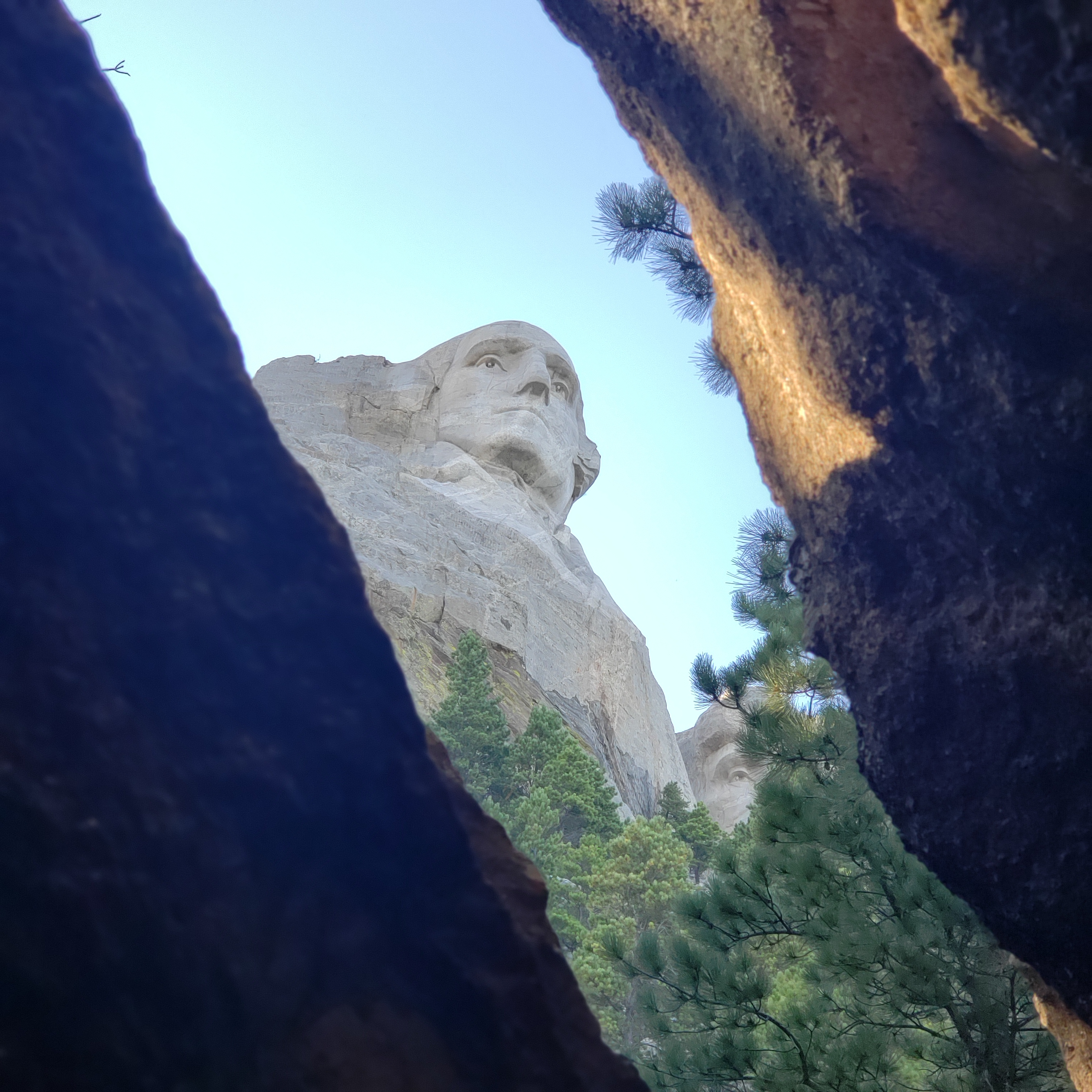
Close up view of George Washington, Presidential Trail

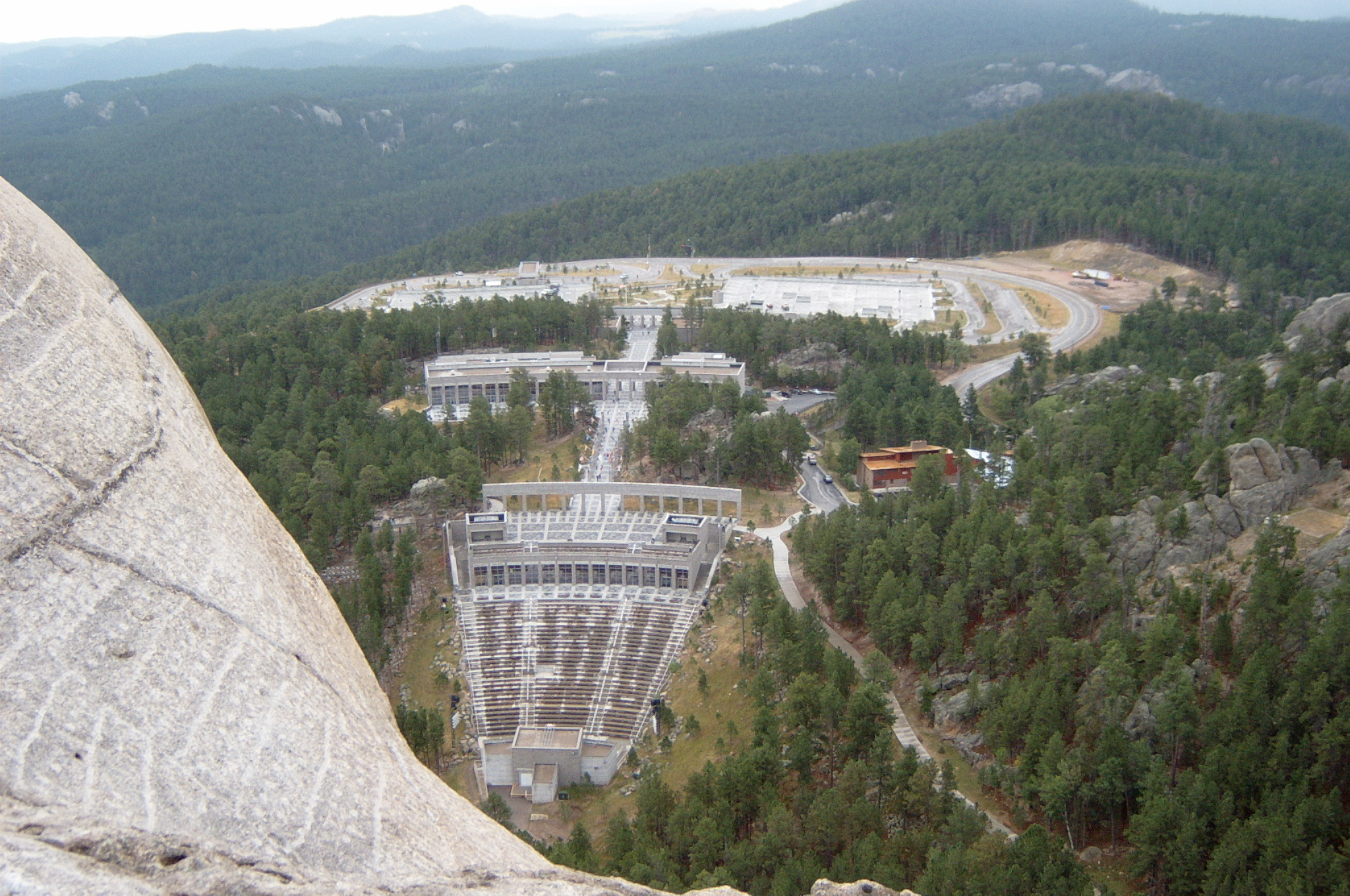
Memorial complex, as seen from Mt. Rushmore.

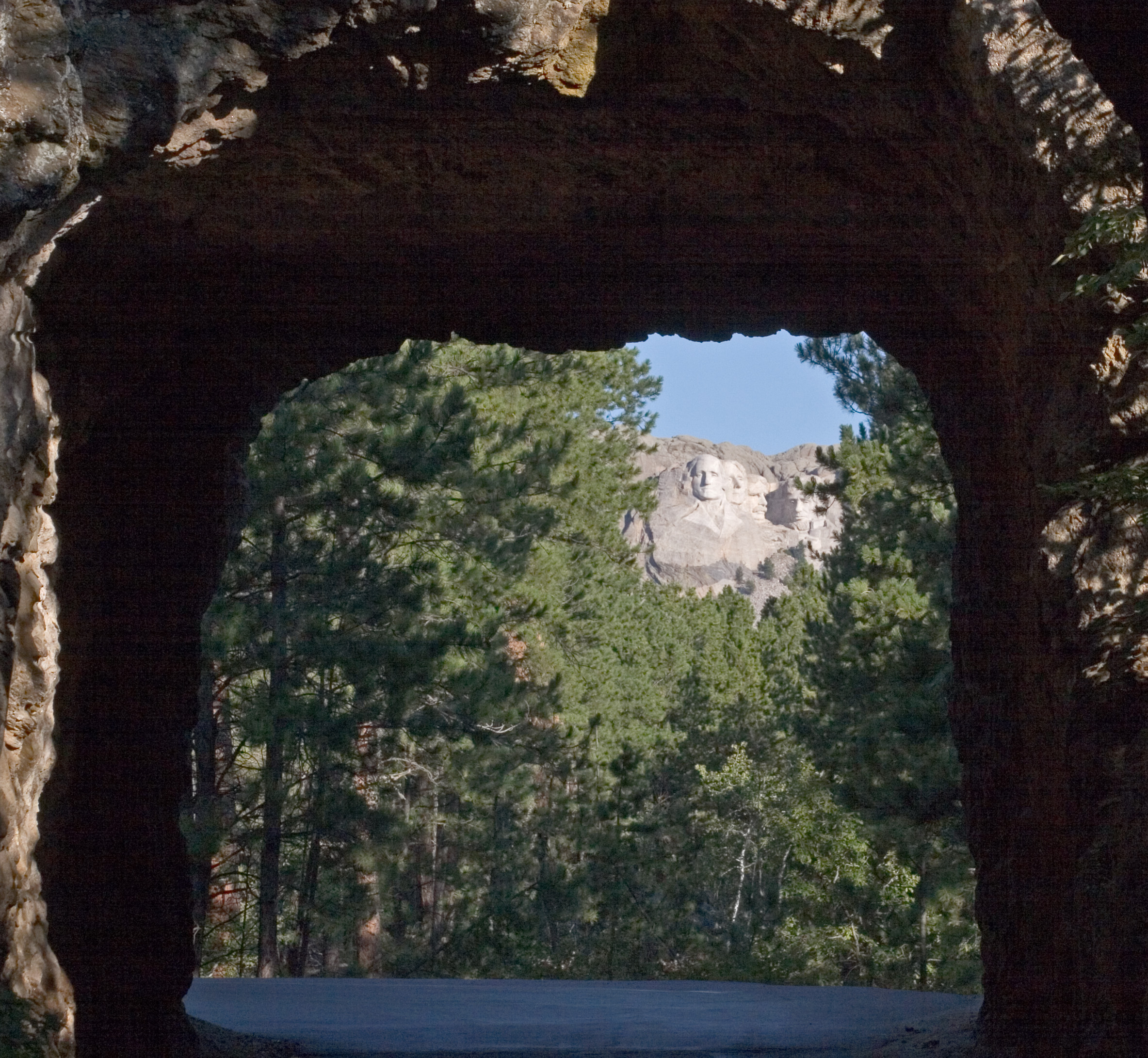
Remote view of Mt. Rushmore, from the CC Gideon Tunnel on Iron Mountain Rd.

=== Hall of Records ===
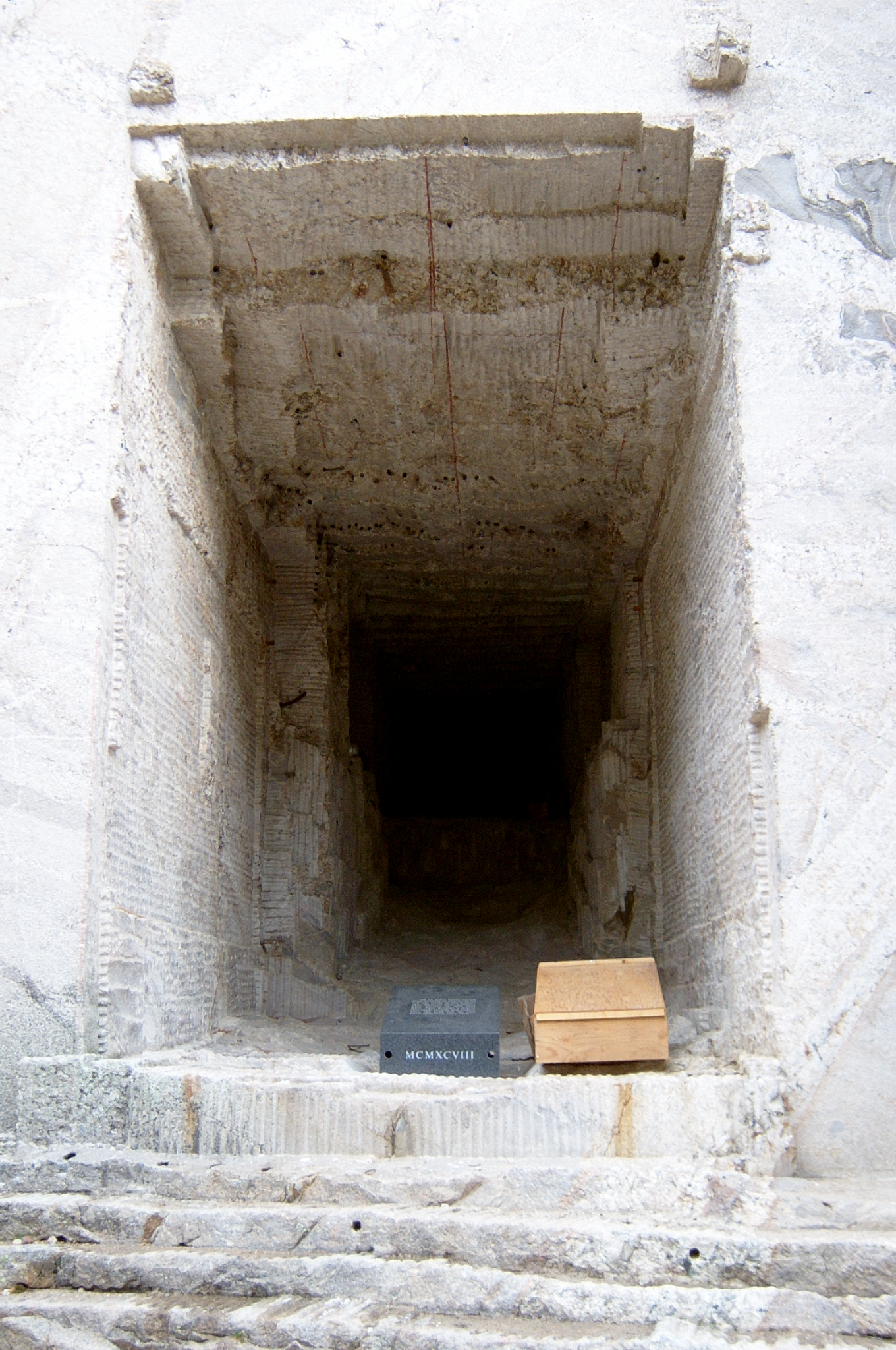
The uncompleted Hall of Records, located near the mountain top, in a crag behind Lincoln's head. The 1998 time capsule can be seen at the entrance.

Borglum originally envisioned a grand Hall of Records where America's greatest historical documents and artifacts, including the United States Constitution and Declaration of Independence, could be protected and exhibited for visitors. The Hall of Records was to be located in a vault that was cut into the interior of the mountain, with an entrance near the top, behind the presidential heads. Borglum envisioned the construction of a long series of stairways that would lead up the side of Mount Rushmore to the vault's entrance.

Borglum and his workers managed to start the project, beginning a vault high on Mount Rushmore, in a crag behind the Abraham Lincoln figure. However, they only managed to cut about 70 feet (21 m) into the rock, before work stopped in 1939 to focus on the heads. No further work on the Hall of Records was carried out after completion of the statues in 1941. No trail was ever built to the uncompleted vault and because of the general policy of keeping visitors away from the mountaintop, the vault has been off-limits to the public, except for a few individuals who have been allowed to document the site while accompanied by park rangers.

In 1998, a stone time capsule was constructed inside the mouth of the cave housing 16 enamel panels with biographical and historical information about Mount Rushmore, as well as the texts of the documents Borglum wanted to preserve there. The repository consists of a teakwood box inside of a titanium vault placed in the ground with an engraved granite capstone. The capstone is typically covered by a wooden lid to further protect it from the elements.

== Monument conservation ==
The ongoing conservation of the site is overseen by the National Park Service. Maintenance of the memorial requires mountain climbers to monitor and seal cracks annually. Due to budget constraints, the memorial is not regularly cleaned to remove lichens. However, in 2005 Alfred Kärcher, a German manufacturer of pressure washing and steam cleaning machines, conducted a free cleanup operation which lasted several weeks, using pressurized water at over 200 °F (93 °C). Other efforts to conserve the monument have included replacement of the sealant applied originally to cracks in the stone by Gutzon Borglum, which had proved ineffective at providing water resistance. The components of Borglum's sealant included linseed oil, granite dust, and white lead, but a modern silicone replacement for the cracks is now used, disguised with granite dust.

In 1998, electronic monitoring devices were installed to track movement in the topology of the sculpture to an accuracy of 0.12 inches (3 mm). The site was digitally recorded in 2009 using a terrestrial laser scanning method as part of the international Scottish Ten project, providing a high-resolution record to aid the conservation of the site. This data was made publicly accessible online.

== Current issues ==
=== Black Hills land dispute ===
The Black Hills, in which Mount Rushmore is situated, is the subject of a land claim by the Lakota people that both precedes the construction of the memorial and is ongoing. The Treaty of Fort Laramie (1868) had granted the Black Hills to the Lakota in perpetuity, but the United States took the area from the tribe after the Great Sioux War of 1876. The 1980 United States Supreme Court decision United States v. Sioux Nation of Indians ruled that the Sioux had not received just compensation for their land in the Black Hills. The court proposed $1.3 billion as compensation for the loss of the Black Hills. However, the tribe has refused the settlement, arguing that this would amount to payment for land they never agreed to sell. Instead, the tribe maintains that the land be returned.

=== Borglum's views and Klan association ===
Mount Rushmore's sculptor, Gutzon Borglum, held nativist, anti-immigrant, anti-Catholic, and deeply antisemitic views that are documented in his correspondence and writings. Prior to his involvement with the Rushmore memorial, Borglum had been the original sculptor of the Confederate memorial at Stone Mountain, Georgia, a project backed and partially funded by the Ku Klux Klan. Borglum was heavily involved with the Klan during this period; he befriended several of its national leaders, served on the organization's committees, and even mediated in factional disputes, though there is no documentary proof that he ever formally joined. Historians have varied in their assessment of Borglum's involvement with the Klan. Howard and Audrey Shaff describe him as motivated less by racism than by opportunism and the need to maintain the financial backing of his Stone Mountain patron Samuel Venable, though also by an affinity for the Klan as an agrarian and populist movement. John Taliaferro and Matthew Davis, by contrast, argue that his prejudices were preexisting and deeply held, with Taliaferro noting that his racist views only became more virulent through his affinity with the Klan.

Borglum's racial views and Klan association have received little attention at Mount Rushmore National Memorial, with accounts by the National Park Service and historical works published in association with the Mount Rushmore National Memorial Society omitting or minimizing the connection. Davis notes that (as of 2025) the site's audio tour and the nearby Borglum museum omit his Klan ties and are largely silent on the topic.

Borglum saw the Stone Mountain and Mount Rushmore projects as explicitly related. In a 1924 letter, he described the South Dakota memorial as "not unrelated to the Memorial to the great Confederates" and as "a great Northern National Memorial" that would be "equal in proportions to the Southern Memorial." Borglum stated his purpose for the Mount Rushmore memorial in nationalistic and civilizational terms. In a 1939 letter, he expressed his determination "that one great record should somewhere be made that would — even ten thousand years hence — tell the people of what manner men invented and built the great West World Republic."

Borglum's attitudes toward Native Americans were comparatively progressive for the era, albeit paternalistic, and he saw no contradiction in carving four white statesmen on land sacred to the Lakota. He is reported to have advocated on behalf of the Lakota before federal officials and welcomed Lakota visitors to the memorial. Lakota spiritual leader Black Elk held a ceremony atop Mount Rushmore, and Borglum supported Henry Standing Bear's proposal to carve a monument honoring a Native leader, an idea that later inspired the nearby Crazy Horse Memorial.

=== Proposals to add additional faces ===
In 1937, when the sculpture was not yet complete, a bill in Congress supporting the addition of women's rights activist Susan B. Anthony failed. When the sculpture was completed in 1941, the sculptors said that the remaining rock was not suitable for additional carvings. This stance was shared by RESPEC, an engineering firm charged with monitoring the stability of the rock in 1989. Proposals of additional sculptures include John F. Kennedy after his assassination in 1963, and Ronald Reagan in 1985 and 1999 – the latter proposal receiving a debate in Congress at the time. Barack Obama was asked about his own potential addition in 2008 and he joked that his ears were too large.

Donald Trump has expressed interest in his own addition to the mountain. During a 2017 rally in Ohio, Trump said, "I'd ask whether or not you some day think I will be on Mount Rushmore ... If I did it joking, totally joking, having fun, the fake news media will say, 'He believes he should be on Mount Rushmore.' So I won't say it." South Dakota Governor Kristi Noem described the potential addition as Trump's "dream" in 2018. On January 28, 2025, Rep. Anna Paulina Luna (R-FL) introduced a bill, H.R. 792, in the House of Representatives to add Trump's likeness to the monument.

=== Protests ===
==== 2009 Greenpeace protest ====
On July 8, 2009, a group of Greenpeace protesters scaled Mount Rushmore, hanging a 65-foot-by-35-foot banner next to former U.S. president Abraham Lincoln's head sculpture. The banner read, "America honors leaders, not politicians. Stop global warming." A total of eleven people were charged with trespassing and the misdemeanor crime of climbing on Mount Rushmore National Monument. According to U.S. attorney Marty Jackley, all people charged pleaded not guilty.

Mount Rushmore Ranger Nav Singh stated that, "security warnings and tourists alerted officials when the banner was unrolled. The banner was removed about an hour after it was unfurled." After the incident security was tightened around Mount Rushmore, with some Mount Rushmore officials saying, "We might change our security measures."

== Geology ==
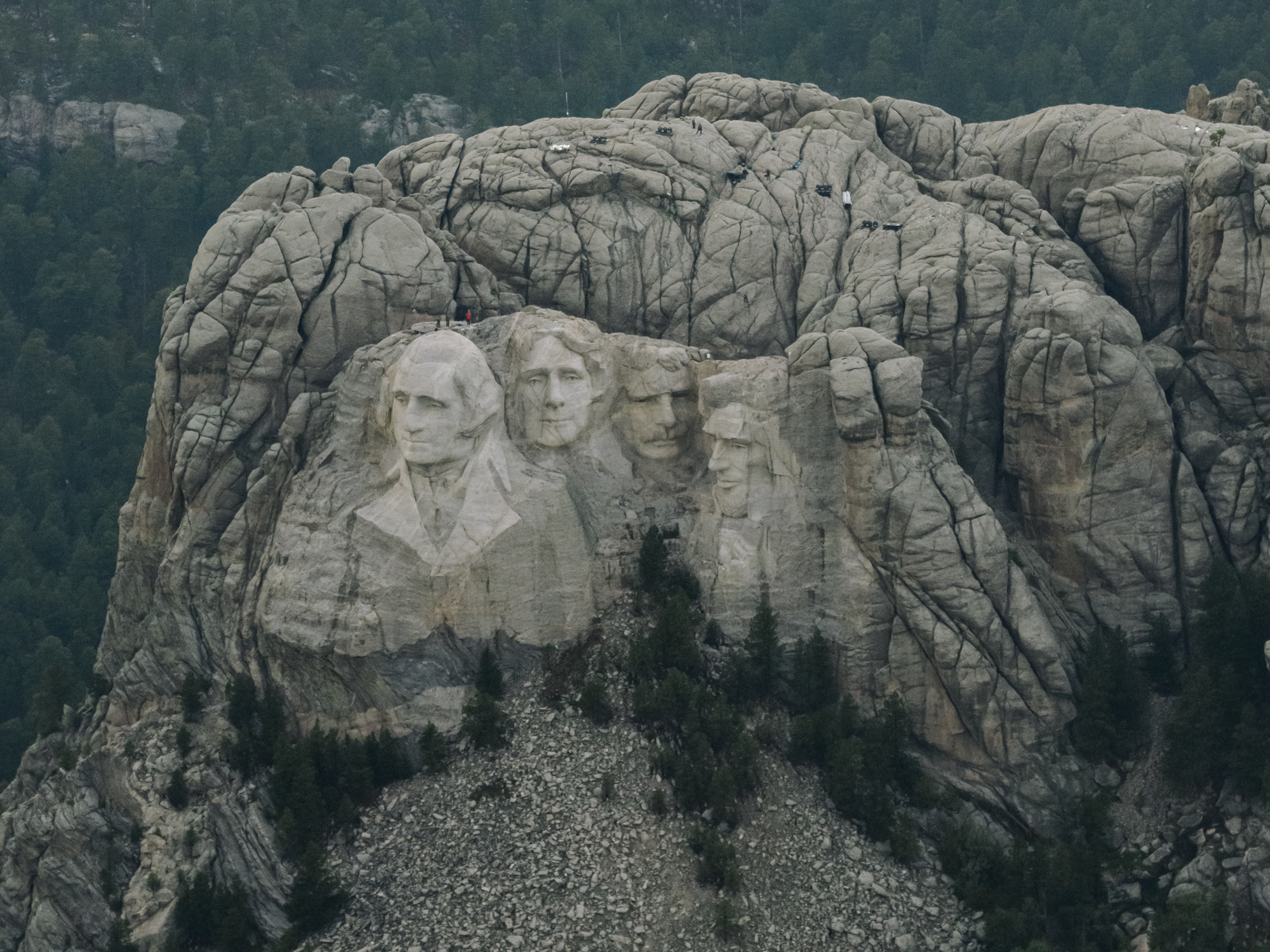
Aerial view of Mount Rushmore in July 2026

Mount Rushmore is largely composed of granite. The memorial is carved on the northwest margin of the Black Elk Peak granite batholith in the Black Hills of South Dakota, so the geologic formations of the heart of the Black Hills region are also evident at Mount Rushmore. The batholith magma intruded into the pre-existing mica schist rocks during the Proterozoic, 1.6 billion years ago. Coarse grained pegmatite dikes are associated with the granite intrusion of Black Elk Peak and are visibly lighter in color, thus explaining the light-colored streaks on the foreheads of the presidents.

The Black Hills granites were exposed to erosion during the Neoproterozoic, but were later buried by sandstone and other sediments during the Cambrian. Remaining buried throughout the Paleozoic, they were re-exposed again during the Laramide orogeny around 70 million years ago. The Black Hills area was uplifted as an elongated geologic dome. Subsequent erosion stripped the granite of the overlying sediments and the softer adjacent schist. Some schist does remain and can be seen as the darker material just below the sculpture of Washington.

The tallest mountain in the region is Black Elk Peak (7,242 ft or 2,207 m). Borglum selected Mount Rushmore as the site for several reasons. The rock of the mountain is composed of smooth, fine-grained granite. The durable granite erodes only 1 inch (25 mm) every 10,000 years, thus was more than sturdy enough to support the sculpture and its long-term exposure. The mountain's height of 5,725 feet (1,745 m) above sea level made it suitable, and because it faces the southeast, the workers also had the advantage of sunlight for most of the day.

=== Soils and hydrology ===
The Mount Rushmore area is underlain by Mocmount and Buska series soils, which are types of well-drained alfisols with gravelly to silty loam soil texture and brown to dark grayish-brown soil color.

The area receives about 18 inches (460 mm) of precipitation on average per year, enough to support abundant animal and plant life. Trees and other plants help to control surface runoff. Dikes, seeps, and springs help to dam up or release water that is flowing downhill, providing watering spots for animals. In addition, stones like sandstone and limestone help to hold groundwater, creating aquifers.

== Climate ==
Mount Rushmore has a dry-winter humid continental climate (Dwb in the Köppen climate classification). The two wettest months of the year are May and June. Orographic lift causes brief but strong afternoon thunderstorms during the summer.

Climate data for Mount Rushmore National Memorial (1991–2020 normals, extremes 1962–present)
Month	Jan	Feb	Mar	Apr	May	Jun	Jul	Aug	Sep	Oct	Nov	Dec	Year
Record high °F (°C)	70 (21)	68 (20)	80 (27)	85 (29)	93 (34)	99 (37)	100 (38)	99 (37)	97 (36)	86 (30)	75 (24)	68 (20)	100 (38)
Mean maximum °F (°C)	57.8 (14.3)	57.3 (14.1)	65.2 (18.4)	72.9 (22.7)	81.5 (27.5)	89.2 (31.8)	92.7 (33.7)	90.9 (32.7)	87.2 (30.7)	77.0 (25.0)	65.4 (18.6)	57.2 (14.0)	94.0 (34.4)
Mean daily maximum °F (°C)	36.8 (2.7)	36.3 (2.4)	44.2 (6.8)	50.2 (10.1)	59.6 (15.3)	71.1 (21.7)	78.7 (25.9)	77.5 (25.3)	69.1 (20.6)	55.0 (12.8)	44.4 (6.9)	36.6 (2.6)	55.0 (12.8)
Daily mean °F (°C)	27.8 (−2.3)	27.3 (−2.6)	34.8 (1.6)	41.0 (5.0)	50.6 (10.3)	61.5 (16.4)	68.9 (20.5)	67.8 (19.9)	59.4 (15.2)	45.9 (7.7)	35.7 (2.1)	28.2 (−2.1)	45.7 (7.6)
Mean daily minimum °F (°C)	18.8 (−7.3)	18.4 (−7.6)	25.4 (−3.7)	31.8 (−0.1)	41.5 (5.3)	51.9 (11.1)	59.1 (15.1)	58.0 (14.4)	49.6 (9.8)	36.8 (2.7)	27.0 (−2.8)	19.8 (−6.8)	36.5 (2.5)
Mean minimum °F (°C)	−5.8 (−21.0)	−4.2 (−20.1)	3.8 (−15.7)	15.3 (−9.3)	26.9 (−2.8)	39.8 (4.3)	48.1 (8.9)	45.9 (7.7)	32.2 (0.1)	17.2 (−8.2)	6.8 (−14.0)	−2.2 (−19.0)	−12.6 (−24.8)
Record low °F (°C)	−38 (−39)	−29 (−34)	−16 (−27)	1 (−17)	14 (−10)	27 (−3)	40 (4)	33 (1)	19 (−7)	−4 (−20)	−12 (−24)	−31 (−35)	−38 (−39)
Average precipitation inches (mm)	0.48 (12)	0.76 (19)	1.35 (34)	2.62 (67)	4.80 (122)	3.58 (91)	3.59 (91)	2.29 (58)	1.76 (45)	1.80 (46)	0.59 (15)	0.50 (13)	24.12 (613)
Average snowfall inches (cm)	7.2 (18)	8.9 (23)	9.6 (24)	13.1 (33)	1.5 (3.8)	0.2 (0.51)	0.0 (0.0)	0.0 (0.0)	0.9 (2.3)	4.9 (12)	6.4 (16)	6.6 (17)	59.3 (151)
Average precipitation days (≥ 0.01 in)	5.1	6.1	6.7	9.7	13.6	13.4	12.4	10.5	7.7	7.1	4.5	4.7	101.5
Average snowy days (≥ 0.1 in)	4.5	4.9	3.9	3.4	0.8	0.1	0.0	0.0	0.2	1.7	3.0	4.0	26.5
Source: NOAA

== Biodiversity and ecology ==
Mount Rushmore falls within the EPA ecoregion of the Black Hills Plateau (17b), an extension of the Middle Rockies ecoregion (17) that is entirely surrounded by the Northwestern Great Plains ecoregion (43).

=== Flora and fauna ===
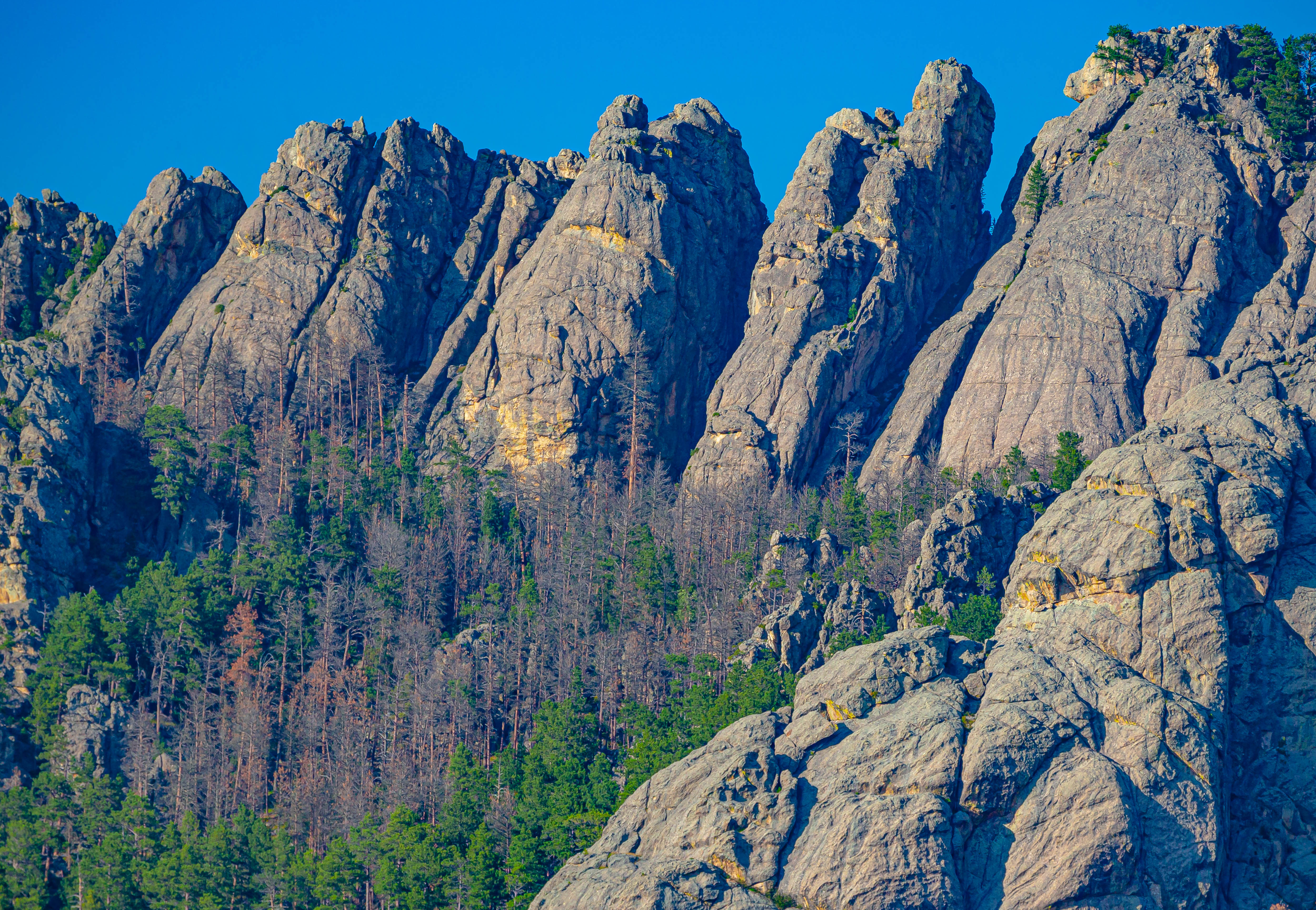
Black Hills granitic peaks and ponderosa pine forest, MRNM. The effect of a pine beetle outbreak can be seen among the trees.

The flora and fauna of Mount Rushmore are characteristic of the larger Black Hills region of South Dakota. The forested areas of the park are largely composed of ponderosa pine, with the majority of it consisting of old-growth stands. Other tree species are found individually or in small groves and include quaking aspen, bur oak, white spruce, and paper birch. Nine species of shrubs grow near Mount Rushmore. There are also a wide variety of wildflowers, including common blanketflower, common sunflower, purple coneflower, upright prairie coneflower, pale agoseris, sawsepal penstemon, Lewis flax, purple prairie clover, wild bergamot, and hoary vervain. Towards higher elevations, plant life becomes sparser.

Avibase lists 154 species of birds as occurring within the park. Common birds include turkey vultures, red-tailed hawks, red-naped sapsuckers, white-breasted nuthatches, mountain bluebirds, and dark-eyed juncos. Herps found in the park include western chorus frogs and northern leopard frogs, along with several species of snake. Grizzly Bear Creek and Starling Basin Creek, the two streams in the memorial, support fish such as longnose dace and brook trout.

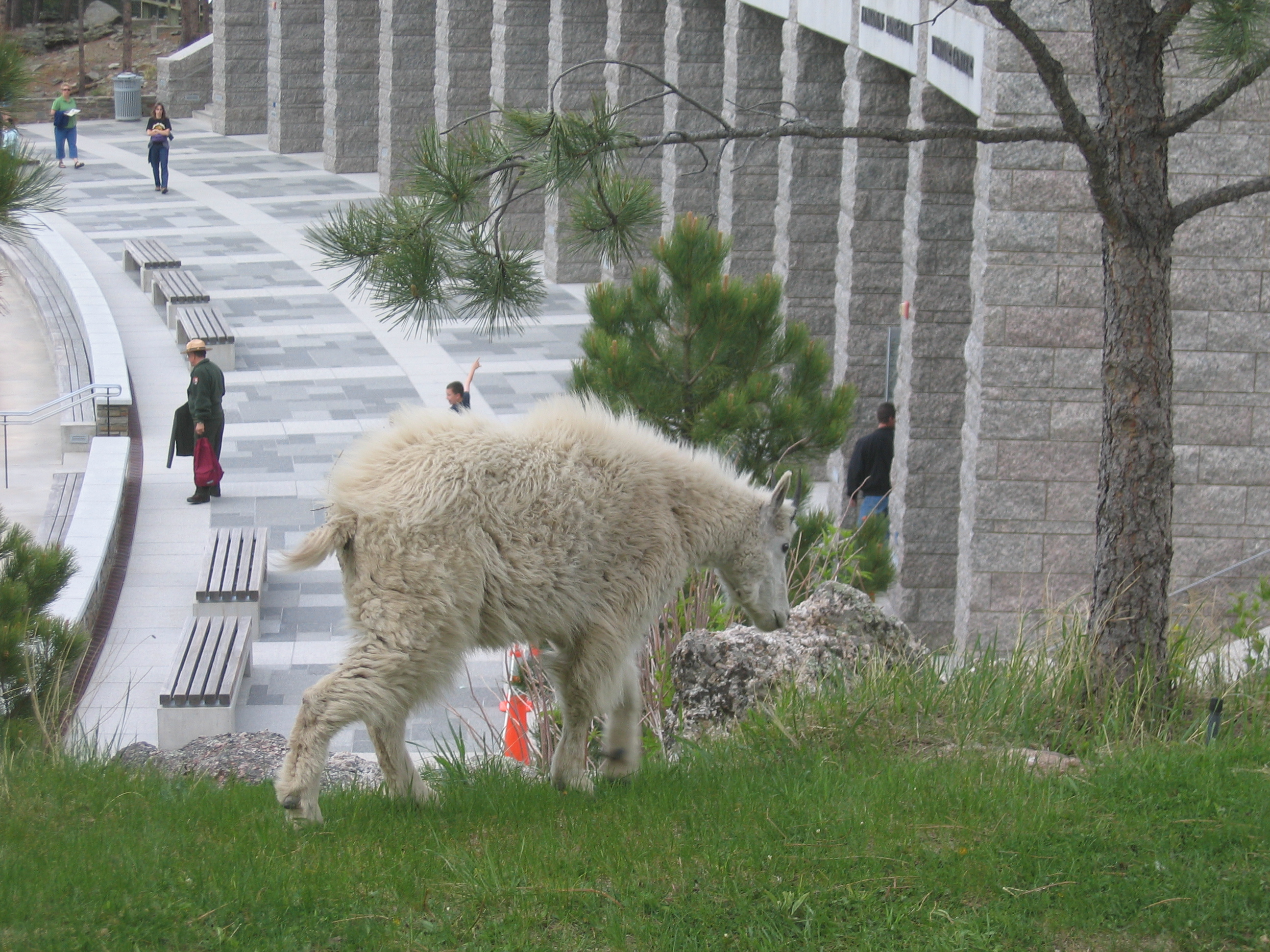
Mountain goat, Grand View Terrace

Mountain goats are a common sight in the park, but are not native fauna. They are descendants of a herd that the Canadian government gave to Custer State Park in 1924, which later escaped and are now widespread through the Black Hills. Common native terrestrial mammals include mule deer, yellow-bellied marmots, American red squirrels, least chipmunks, and eastern and white-footed deer mice. Coyotes and northern flying squirrels are also occasionally seen. The monument is also an important habitat for bats, and 11 species of bats have been reported from the park, including silver-haired and hoary bats and the endangered northern myotis. The fungus causing white-nose syndrome in bats has not been detected in the park, but has been detected at the nearby Badlands National Park.

=== Forest ecology ===
A 2007 study found that almost two-thirds of the park's acreage (850 acres (344 hectares)) consisted of old-growth ponderosa pine forest, and of this 44% had no history of logging at all. This is unusual in the Black Hills, which has been heavily logged in the years since Euroamerican settlement, and represents one of the largest contiguous area of old-growth forest in the Black Hills, second only to Custer State Park. Forest fires occur in the ponderosa forests surrounding Mount Rushmore with a mean interval of every 27 years, as indicated by dendrochronology studies of local trees. Large fires are not common. Most events have been ground fires that serve to clear forest debris.

A 2010 article by a National Park Service fire ecologist notes that due to historical fire suppression policies in and around the park, much of the park's forested area had become overgrown with small understory trees that could serve as fuel for a large forest fire. The article recommended a regime of mechanical thinning and woodchipping followed by prescribed burning to mitigate the fire hazard, as well as to make the forest more resilient against pine beetle infestation and to restore the natural stand structure in these woodlands.

=== Environmental issues ===
A 2016 investigation by the U.S. Geological Survey found unusually high concentrations of perchlorate in the surface water and groundwater of the area. A sample collected from a stream had a maximum perchlorate concentration of 54 micrograms per liter, roughly 270 times higher than samples taken from locations outside the area. The report concluded the probable cause of the contamination was the aerial fireworks displays that had taken place on Independence Days from 1998 to 2009. The National Park Service also reported that at least 27 forest fires around Mount Rushmore in that same period (1998 to 2009) have been caused by fireworks displays. Nevertheless, an environmental impact assessment issued in 2020 left room for the possibility of returning fireworks to the memorial in the future.

== Recreation ==
The centerpiece of the park is the monument and viewing the monument and associated activities is the main attraction of the National Memorial. However, the larger 1,278-acre (517-hectare) park includes natural areas beyond the memorial itself.

Rock climbing and bouldering are popular activities within the park and nearby areas, though climbing anywhere close to the statues is prohibited and carries legal penalties. However, areas to the north of the memorial are popular climbing areas, and include the face of Mount Rushmore opposite the statues and the neighboring peak Old Baldy Mountain, as well as numerous other needles, peaks, and boulders. Noted climbers Jan and Herb Conn pioneered many climbing routes in this area in the 1940s and eventually came to make their home in the Black Hills in 1949. The area has over 800 climbing routes today, most requiring a high degree of technical skill.

The best-known walking trail in the park is the Presidential Trail, near to the main memorial complex. However, there are also two hiking trails that are found in more remote areas of the park. The Blackberry Trail extends from just across from the main parking lot through the southern part of the park and into the Black Elk Wilderness, connecting to the Centennial Trail about 0.8 miles (1.3 km) from the trailhead. There is also a trail to the top of Old Baldy Mountain at the northern edge of the park. The trail begins at the Wrinkled Rock trailhead, just outside of the west entrance to the park and most of its course is outside of the boundaries of the National Memorial. It leads to the summit of Old Baldy after 1.5 miles (2.4 km), where there is a panoramic view of the Black Hills from the summit. However, only the backside of Mount Rushmore is in the line of sight from the summit and the statues cannot be seen.

Camping is not allowed within the boundaries of the National Memorial, however, there are public and private campgrounds and dispersed camping in the neighboring Black Hills National Forest.

== Tourism ==
Historical visitor count
Year	Visitors
1941	393,000
1950	740,499
1960	1,067,000
1970	1,965,700
1980	1,284,888
1990	1,671,673
2000	1,868,876
2010	2,331,237
2020	2,074,986

Tourism is South Dakota's second-largest industry, and Mount Rushmore is the state's top tourist attraction. A total of 2,440,449 people visited the park in 2022.

The popularity of the location, as with many other national monuments, derives from its immediate recognizability; "there are no substitutes for iconic resources such as the Statue of Liberty, the Lincoln Memorial, or Mount Rushmore. These locations are one of a kind places".

In the 1950s and 1960s, local Lakota Sioux elder Benjamin Black Elk (son of medicine man Black Elk, who had been present at the Battle of the Little Bighorn) was known as the "Fifth Face of Mount Rushmore", posing for photographs with thousands of tourists daily in his native attire. The South Dakota State Historical Society notes that he was one of the most photographed people in the world over that 20-year period.

== In philately and numismatics ==
On August 11, 1952, the U.S. Post Office issued the Mount Rushmore Memorial 3-cent commemorative stamp on the 25th anniversary of the dedication of the Mount Rushmore National Memorial. On January 2, 1974, a 26-cent airmail stamp depicting the monument was also issued. In 1991, the United States Mint released commemorative silver dollar, half-dollar, and five-dollar coins celebrating the 50th anniversary of the monument's dedication, and the sculpture was the main subject of the 2006 South Dakota state quarter.

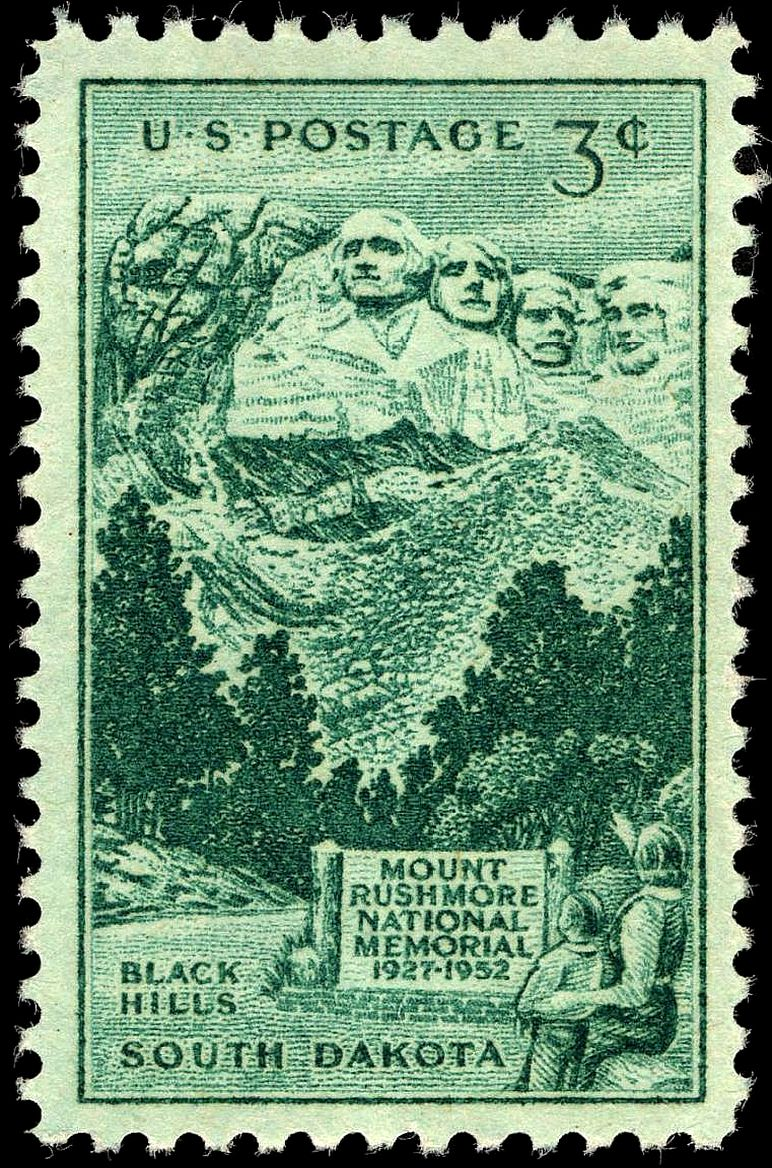
1952 3-cent stamp

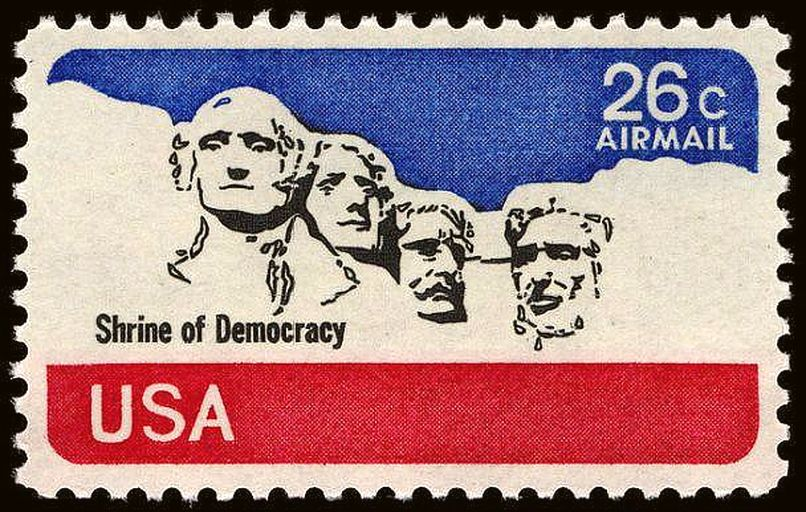
26-cent Mount Rushmore "Shrine of Democracy" airmail stamp, 1974

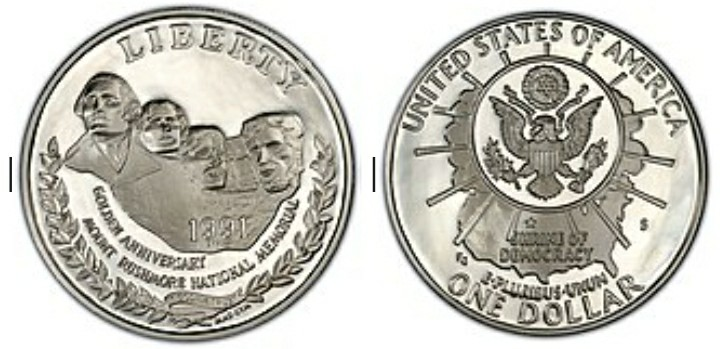
The 1991 Mount Rushmore 50th Anniversary commemorative silver dollar

== In popular culture ==
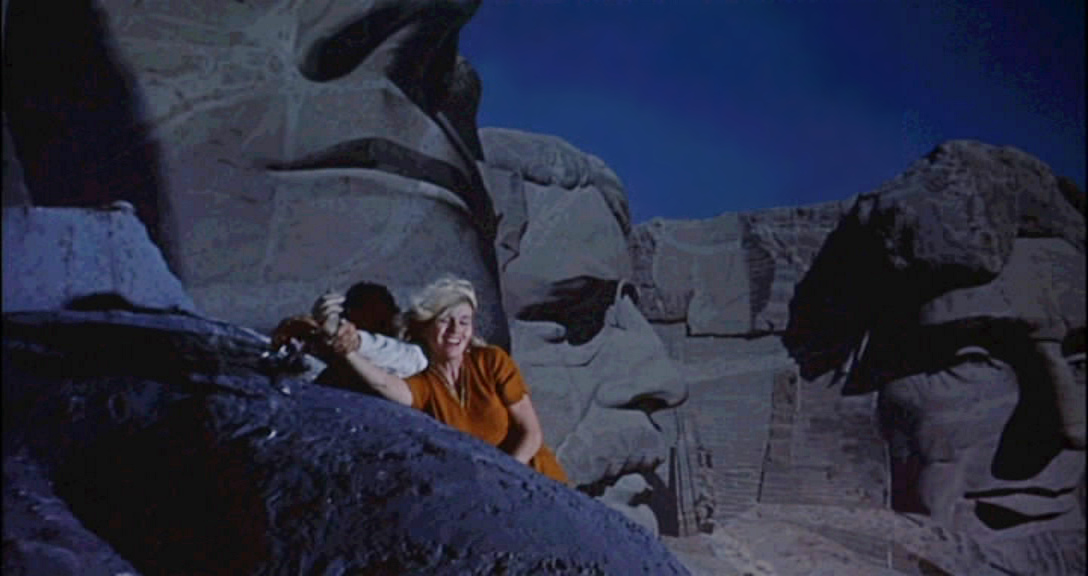
Roger Thornhill (Cary Grant) and Eve Kendall (Eva Marie Saint) dangle precipitously from the sculpture of George Washington in the 1959 film North by Northwest.

The film trailer for North by Northwest prominently features the site and sculpture.

=== In film ===
Mount Rushmore has been depicted in multiple films, comic books, and television series. Its functions vary from settings for action scenes to the site of hidden locations. Its most famous appearance is as the location of the final chase scene in the 1959 film North by Northwest. It is used as a secret base of operations by the protagonists in the 2004 film Team America: World Police, and the secret underground city of Cíbola is located there in the 2007 film National Treasure: Book of Secrets. In the Phineas and Ferb episode Candace Loses Her Head, both Phineas and Ferb sculpt Candace's face on the monument for her 15th birthday. In some films, the presidential faces are replaced with others; examples include the 1980 film Superman II and the 1996 film Mars Attacks! where the villains add their faces to the monument, and the 2003 film Head of State where the newly elected president's face is added. In works showing attacks on landmarks to signify the scope of a threat, Mount Rushmore is a common target; examples include the aforementioned facial replacements in Superman II and Mars Attacks! as well as natural disasters in works like the 2006 miniseries 10.5: Apocalypse and terrorist attacks as in the 1997 film The Peacekeeper. An atypical representation of the monument appears in the 2013 film Nebraska, where instead of being treated with reverence it is criticized for being unfinished.

=== In music ===
In music, American composer Michael Daugherty's 2010 piece for chorus and orchestra, "Mount Rushmore", depicts each of the four presidents in separate movements. The piece sets texts by George Washington, William Billings, Thomas Jefferson, Maria Cosway, Theodore Roosevelt, and Abraham Lincoln. By contrast, the song, "Little Snakes", by Protest The Hero, "addresses the violent colonial history involved in the sculpting of Mount Rushmore", critiquing the monument as a symbol of colonialism, referencing the genocide of indigenous peoples and the ownership of slaves by George Washington and Thomas Jefferson.

=== Other ===
The Washington Nationals baseball club uses large foam rubber depictions of the "Rushmore Four" in both their marketing campaigns and in a series of in-stadium promotions such as the Presidents Race.

"The Mount Rushmore State" has been South Dakota's official state nickname since 1980, in place of its former official nickname, "The Coyote State". The school district of South Dakota's largest city, Sioux Falls, has named its high schools for each of the four Mount Rushmore presidents. These are Washington High School opened in 1908, Lincoln High School opened in 1955, Roosevelt High School opened in 1991, and Jefferson High School opened in 2021.

== See also ==
- Crazy Horse Memorial, another large sculpture in the Black Hills
- List of colossal sculpture in situ
- List of national memorials of the United States
- List of sculptures of presidents of the United States
- List of statues of Abraham Lincoln
- List of statues of George Washington
- List of statues of Thomas Jefferson
- List of tallest statues
- Presidential memorials in the United States
- Young Mao Zedong statue, a large relief carved of granite, although not carved into the rock
- Atatürk Mask, a large relief sculpture, although not carved into the rock
