= Aberdeen micropolitan area, South Dakota =

Aberdeen Micropolitan Area
- Micropolitan Statistical Area
- Aberdeen, SD Micropolitan Statistical Area
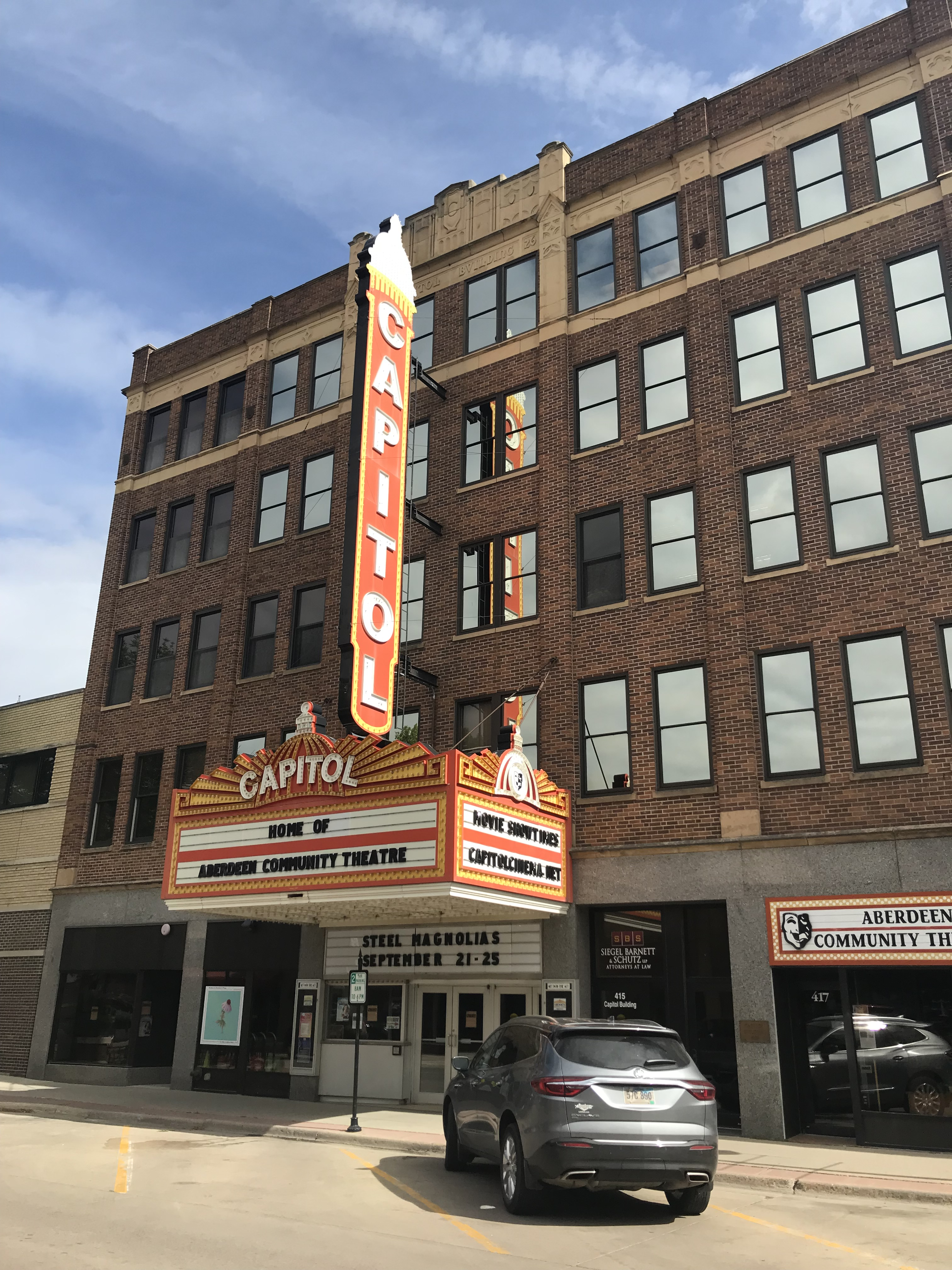
- Capitol Theatre in Downtown Aberdeen
Interactive Map of Aberdeen, SD μSA
City of Aberdeen
Aberdeen, SD μSA
- Country: United States
- State: South Dakota
- Largest city: Aberdeen
- Time zone: UTC−6 (CST)
  - Summer (DST): UTC−5 (CDT)

The Aberdeen Micropolitan Statistical Area, as defined by the United States Census Bureau, is an area consisting of two counties in South Dakota, anchored by the city of Aberdeen. As of the 2020 census, the μSA had a population of 42,287.

== Counties ==
Historical population
Census	Pop.	Note	%±
1880	353		—
1890	21,254		5,921.0%
1900	20,202		−4.9%
1910	33,521		65.9%
1920	37,845		12.9%
1930	40,170		6.1%
1940	37,490		−6.7%
1950	39,892		6.4%
1960	40,185		0.7%
1970	42,468		5.7%
1980	42,121		−0.8%
1990	39,936		−5.2%
2000	39,827		−0.3%
2010	40,602		1.9%
2020	42,287		4.2%
U.S. Decennial Census

- Brown
- Edmunds

== Communities ==
- Places with more than 27,500 inhabitants
  - Aberdeen (Principal city)
- Places with 600 to 1,600 inhabitants
  - Groton
  - Ipswich
- Places with 300 to 600 inhabitants
  - Bowdle
  - Roscoe
  - Warner
- Places with 100 to 300 inhabitants
  - Claremont
  - Columbia
  - Frederick
  - Hecla
  - Hosmer
  - Westport
- Places with less than 100 inhabitants
  - Stratford
  - Verdon
- Unincorporated places
  - Barnard
  - Bath
  - Beebe
  - Craven
  - Ferney
  - Gretna
  - Houghton
  - Huffton
  - James
  - Loyalton
  - Mansfield
  - Mina
  - Ordway
  - Powell
  - Randolph
  - Richmond

== Demographics ==
As of the census of 2010, there were 40,602 people, 16,493 households, and 9,853 families residing within the μSA. The racial makeup of the μSA was 93.7% White, 0.5% African American, 2.8% Native American, 0.9% Asian, 0.1% Pacific Islander, 0.4% from other races, and 1.7% from two or more races. Hispanic or Latino of any race were 1.4% of the population.

The median income for a household in the μSA was $48,639, and the median income for a family was $63,069. Males had a median income of $39,358 versus $31,007 for females. The per capita income for the μSA was $25,640.

== See also ==
- South Dakota census statistical areas
