= South Dakota statistical areas =

Coordinates: 44.4443°N 100.2263°W

The U.S. State of South Dakota currently has 14 statistical areas that have been delineated by the Office of Management and Budget (OMB). On July 21, 2023, the OMB delineated two combined statistical areas, three metropolitan statistical areas, and nine micropolitan statistical areas in South Dakota. As of 2025, the largest of these is the Sioux Falls, SD-MN MSA, comprising the area around the state's largest city of Sioux Falls.

== Statistical areas ==
The Office of Management and Budget (OMB) has designated more than 1,000 statistical areas for the United States and Puerto Rico. These statistical areas are important geographic delineations of population clusters used by the OMB, the United States Census Bureau, planning organizations, and federal, state, and local government entities.

The OMB defines a core-based statistical area (commonly referred to as a CBSA) as the county or counties (or county-equivalents) surrounding at least one densely-settled core of at least 10,000 population, "plus adjacent counties having a high degree of social and economic integration with the core as measured through commuting ties with the counties containing the core". The OMB further divides core-based statistical areas based on population into metropolitan statistical areas (MSAs) for those with at least 50,000 and micropolitan statistical areas (μSAs) for those with 10,000 to 49,999 people.

The OMB defines a combined statistical area (CSA) as two or more adjacent core-based statistical areas where the employment interchange rate (% commuting from A to B plus % commuting from B to A) is at least 15%. The primary statistical areas (PSAs) include all combined statistical areas and any core-based statistical area that is not a constituent of a combined statistical area.

The 14 United States statistical areas and 66 counties of the State of South Dakota (Note: An out-of-state area and its population are displayed in green. An area that extends into more than one state is displayed in purple. A purple population number over a black population number show the total population versus the in-state population. The state's abbreviation is also shown next to the in-state total.)
Combined statistical area	2025 population (est.)	Core-based statistical area	2025 population (est.)	County	2025 population (est.)
none		Sioux Falls, SD-MN MSA	314,638; 305,114 (SD)	Minnehaha County, South Dakota	212,691
none		Sioux Falls, SD-MN MSA	314,638; 305,114 (SD)	Lincoln County, South Dakota	77,145
none		Sioux Falls, SD-MN MSA	314,638; 305,114 (SD)	Rock County, Minnesota	9,524
none		Sioux Falls, SD-MN MSA	314,638; 305,114 (SD)	Turner County, South Dakota	9,314
none		Sioux Falls, SD-MN MSA	314,638; 305,114 (SD)	McCook County, South Dakota	5,964
Rapid City–Spearfish, SD CSA	186,393	Rapid City, SD MSA	156,934	Pennington County, South Dakota	116,792
Rapid City–Spearfish, SD CSA	186,393	Rapid City, SD MSA	156,934	Meade County, South Dakota	30,711
Rapid City–Spearfish, SD CSA	186,393	Rapid City, SD MSA	156,934	Custer County, South Dakota	9,431
Rapid City–Spearfish, SD CSA	186,393	Spearfish, SD μSA	29,459	Lawrence County, South Dakota	29,459
none		Aberdeen, SD μSA	41,583	Brown County, South Dakota	37,561
none		Aberdeen, SD μSA	41,583	Edmunds County, South Dakota	4,022
none		Brookings, SD μSA	37,635	Brookings County, South Dakota	37,635
none		Watertown, SD μSA	29,562	Codington County, South Dakota	29,562
none		Mitchell, SD μSA	25,913	Davison County, South Dakota	20,069
none		Mitchell, SD μSA	25,913	Hanson County, South Dakota	3,456
none		Mitchell, SD μSA	25,913	Sanborn County, South Dakota	2,388
none		Yankton, SD μSA	23,635	Yankton County, South Dakota	23,635
none		Pierre, SD μSA	20,588	Hughes County, South Dakota	17,570
none		Pierre, SD μSA	20,588	Stanley County, South Dakota	3,018
none		Huron, SD μSA	19,624	Beadle County, South Dakota	19,624
Sioux City–Le Mars, IA-NE-SD CSA	171,435; 17,402 (SD)	Sioux City, IA-NE-SD MSA	145,738; 17,402 (SD)	Woodbury County, Iowa	106,649
Sioux City–Le Mars, IA-NE-SD CSA	171,435; 17,402 (SD)	Sioux City, IA-NE-SD MSA	145,738; 17,402 (SD)	Dakota County, Nebraska	21,687
Sioux City–Le Mars, IA-NE-SD CSA	171,435; 17,402 (SD)	Sioux City, IA-NE-SD MSA	145,738; 17,402 (SD)	Union County, South Dakota	17,402
Sioux City–Le Mars, IA-NE-SD CSA	171,435; 17,402 (SD)	Le Mars, IA μSA	25,697	Plymouth County, Iowa	25,697
none		Vermillion, SD μSA	15,031	Clay County, South Dakota	15,031
none		none		Oglala Lakota County, South Dakota	13,338
none		none		Lake County, South Dakota	10,993
none		none		Butte County, South Dakota	10,856
none		none		Roberts County, South Dakota	10,255
none		none		Charles Mix County, South Dakota	9,303
none		none		Todd County, South Dakota	8,863
none		none		Grant County, South Dakota	7,534
none		none		Fall River County, South Dakota	7,467
none		none		Hutchinson County, South Dakota	7,413
none		none		Bon Homme County, South Dakota	7,244
none		none		Hamlin County, South Dakota	6,900
none		none		Moody County, South Dakota	6,632
none		none		Spink County, South Dakota	6,155
none		none		Tripp County, South Dakota	5,708
none		none		Day County, South Dakota	5,484
none		none		Dewey County, South Dakota	5,419
none		none		Kingsbury County, South Dakota	5,284
none		none		Brule County, South Dakota	5,278
none		none		Walworth County, South Dakota	5,217
none		none		Marshall County, South Dakota	4,426
none		none		Deuel County, South Dakota	4,408
none		none		Gregory County, South Dakota	4,037
none		none		Clark County, South Dakota	4,031
none		none		Corson County, South Dakota	3,781
none		none		Lyman County, South Dakota	3,694
none		none		Bennett County, South Dakota	3,307
none		none		Hand County, South Dakota	3,121
none		none		Douglas County, South Dakota	2,888
none		none		Perkins County, South Dakota	2,853
none		none		Aurora County, South Dakota	2,801
none		none		Jackson County, South Dakota	2,666
none		none		Ziebach County, South Dakota	2,389
none		none		Potter County, South Dakota	2,377
none		none		McPherson County, South Dakota	2,347
none		none		Miner County, South Dakota	2,281
none		none		Faulk County, South Dakota	2,178
none		none		Mellette County, South Dakota	2,137
none		none		Buffalo County, South Dakota	1,802
none		none		Haakon County, South Dakota	1,802
none		none		Jerauld County, South Dakota	1,654
none		none		Sully County, South Dakota	1,479
none		none		Campbell County, South Dakota	1,377
none		none		Harding County, South Dakota	1,331
none		none		Hyde County, South Dakota	1,191
none		none		Jones County, South Dakota	913
State of South Dakota					935,094

The 12 core-based statistical areas of the State of South Dakota (Note: For CBSAs comprising populations from multiple states, they are listed twice to show both their intrastate population within that CBSA as well as the CBSA's total population. Only the intrastate population is ranked.)
2025 rank	Core-based statistical area	Population				
2025 rank	Core-based statistical area	2025 estimate	Change	2020 Census	Change	2010 Census
1	Sioux Falls, SD-MN MSA (SD)	305,114	+10.26%	276,730	+21.03%	228,651
2	Rapid City, SD MSA	156,934	+6.47%	147,392	+9.51%	134,598
3	Aberdeen, SD μSA	41,583	−1.66%	42,287	+4.15%	40,602
4	Brookings, SD μSA	37,635	+9.48%	34,375	+7.54%	31,965
5	Watertown, SD μSA	29,562	+4.37%	28,325	+4.03%	27,227
6	Spearfish, SD μSA	29,459	+14.32%	25,768	+6.93%	24,097
7	Mitchell, SD μSA (MN)	25,913	+0.64%	25,747	+2.21%	25,190
8	Yankton, SD μSA	23,635	+1.39%	23,310	+3.89%	22,438
9	Pierre, SD μSA	20,588	−0.76%	20,745	+3.79%	19,988
10	Huron, SD μSA	19,624	+2.48%	19,149	+10.06%	17,398
11	Sioux City, IA-NE-SD MSA (SD)	17,402	+3.52%	16,811	+16.75%	14,399
12	Vermillion, SD μSA	15,031	+0.43%	14,967	+7.96%	13,864
	Sioux City, IA-NE-SD MSA	145,738	+0.97%	144,334	+4.91%	137,577
	Sioux Falls, SD-MN MSA	314,638	+9.85%	286,434	+20.18%	238,338

The two combined statistical areas of the State of South Dakota (Note: For CSAs comprising populations from multiple states, they are listed twice to show both their intrastate population within that CSA as well as the CSA's total population. Only the intrastate population is ranked.)
2025 rank	Combined statistical area	Population				
2025 rank	Combined statistical area	2025 estimate	Change	2020 Census	Change	2010 Census
1	Rapid City–Spearfish, SD CSA	186,393	+7.64%	173,160	+9.11%	158,695
2	Sioux City–Le Mars, IA-NE-SD CSA (SD)	17,402	+3.52%	16,811	+16.75%	14,399
	Sioux City–Le Mars, IA-NE-SD CSA	171,435	+0.83%	170,032	+4.59%	162,563

== See also ==
- Geography of South Dakota
  - Demographics of South Dakota
