= Hutterville Colony, South Dakota =

- Census-designated place
- Location within South Dakota Location within the United States
- Coordinates: 45°15′59″N 98°12′41″W
- Country: United States
- State: South Dakota
- County: Brown

Area
  - Total: 0.22 sq mi (0.58 km^{2})
  - Land: 0.22 sq mi (0.58 km^{2})
  - Water: 0 sq mi (0.00 km^{2})
- Elevation: 1,299 ft (396 m)

Population (2020)
  - Total: 95
  - Density: 425.4/sq mi (164.25/km^{2})
- Time zone: UTC-6 (Central (CST))
  - Summer (DST): UTC-5 (CDT)
- ZIP Code: 57474 (Stratford)
- Area code: 605
- FIPS code: 46-31196
- GNIS feature ID: 2813000

Hutterville Colony is a Hutterite colony and census-designated place (CDP) in Brown County, South Dakota, United States. It was first listed as a CDP prior to the 2020 census. The CDP had a population of 95 at the 2020 census.

It is in the southeast part of the county, 7 miles (11 km) southeast of Stratford and 26 miles (42 km) southeast of Aberdeen, the county seat.

== Demographics ==
Historical population
Census	Pop.	Note	%±
2020	95		—
U.S. Decennial Census
