= Bath Corner, South Dakota =

Bath, South Dakota
- Census-designated place
- Location within South Dakota Location within the United States
- Coordinates: 45°27′32″N 98°19′45″W
- Country: United States
- State: South Dakota
- County: Brown

Area
  - Total: 0.17 sq mi (0.45 km^{2})
  - Land: 0.17 sq mi (0.45 km^{2})
  - Water: 0 sq mi (0.00 km^{2})
- Elevation: 1,302 ft (397 m)

Population (2020)
  - Total: 51
  - Density: 292.1/sq mi (112.79/km^{2})
- Time zone: UTC-6 (Central (CST))
  - Summer (DST): UTC-5 (CDT)
- ZIP code: 57427
- Area code: 605
- FIPS code: 46-03960
- GNIS feature ID: 2584545

Bath Corner is an unincorporated community and census-designated place in Brown County, South Dakota, United States. As of the 2020 census, it had a population of 51. Bath Corner is adjacent to the somewhat larger CDP of Bath and is 7 miles (11 km) east of the city of Aberdeen, the Brown County seat.

== Demographics ==
Historical population
Census	Pop.	Note	%±
2020	51		—
U.S. Decennial Census
