= Aberdeen Township =

Aberdeen Township may refer to the following townships in the US:

- Aberdeen Township, New Jersey
- Aberdeen Township, Brown County, South Dakota
