= Brown County Courthouse (South Dakota) =

- U.S. National Register of Historic Places
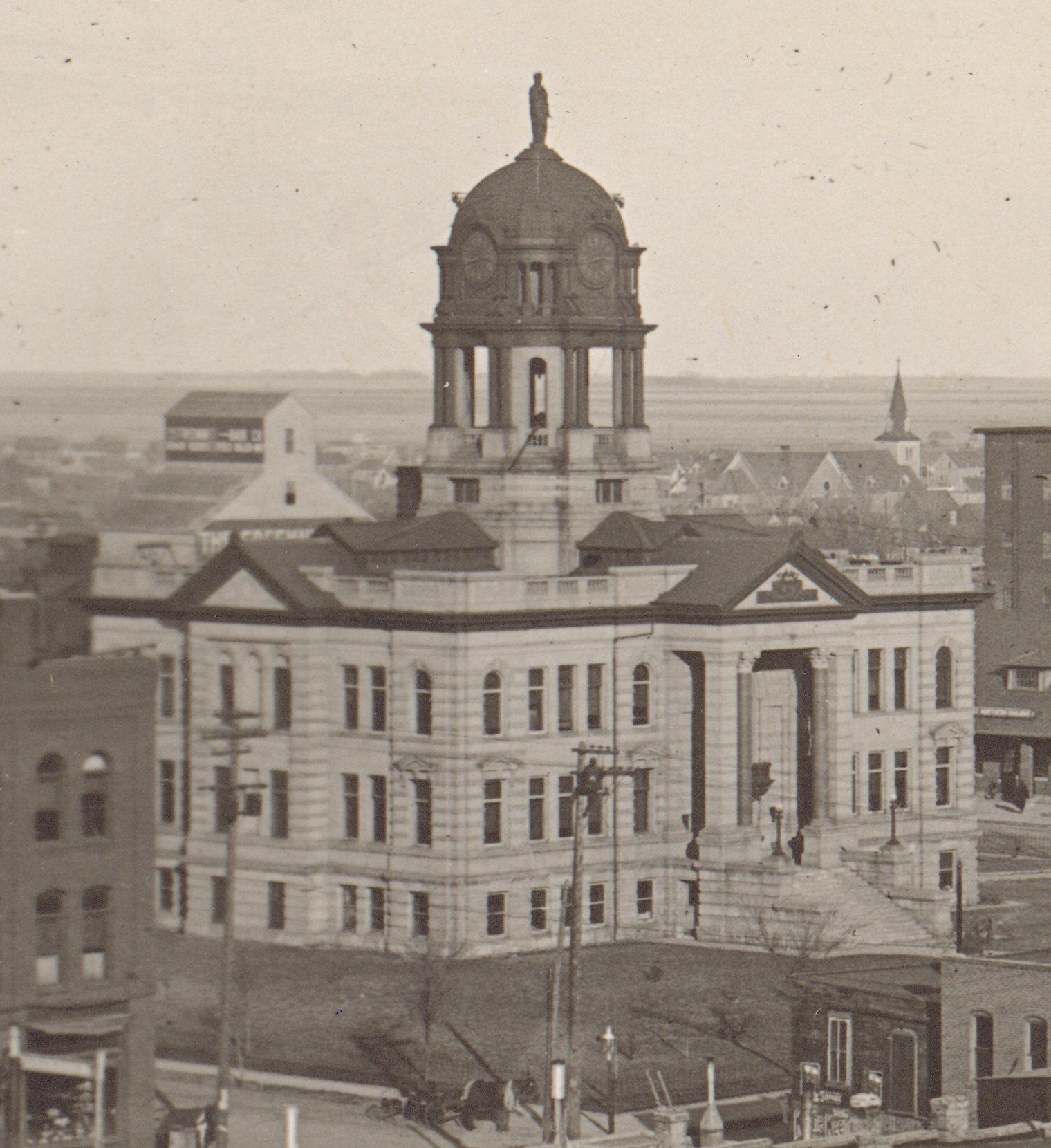
- Courthouse circa 1910, showing original stairway

- Location within South Dakota Location within the United States
- Interactive map showing the location of Brown County Courthouse
- Location: Aberdeen, South Dakota
- Coordinates: 45.4646°N 98.4866°W
- Built: 1904
- Architect: Kinney & Detweiler
- Architectural style: Renaissance Revival
- NRHP reference No.: 76001718
- Added to NRHP: June 3, 1976

The Brown County Courthouse is a historic courthouse in Aberdeen, the county seat of Brown County, South Dakota. It was built in 1904 and is listed on the National Register of Historic Places.

== History ==
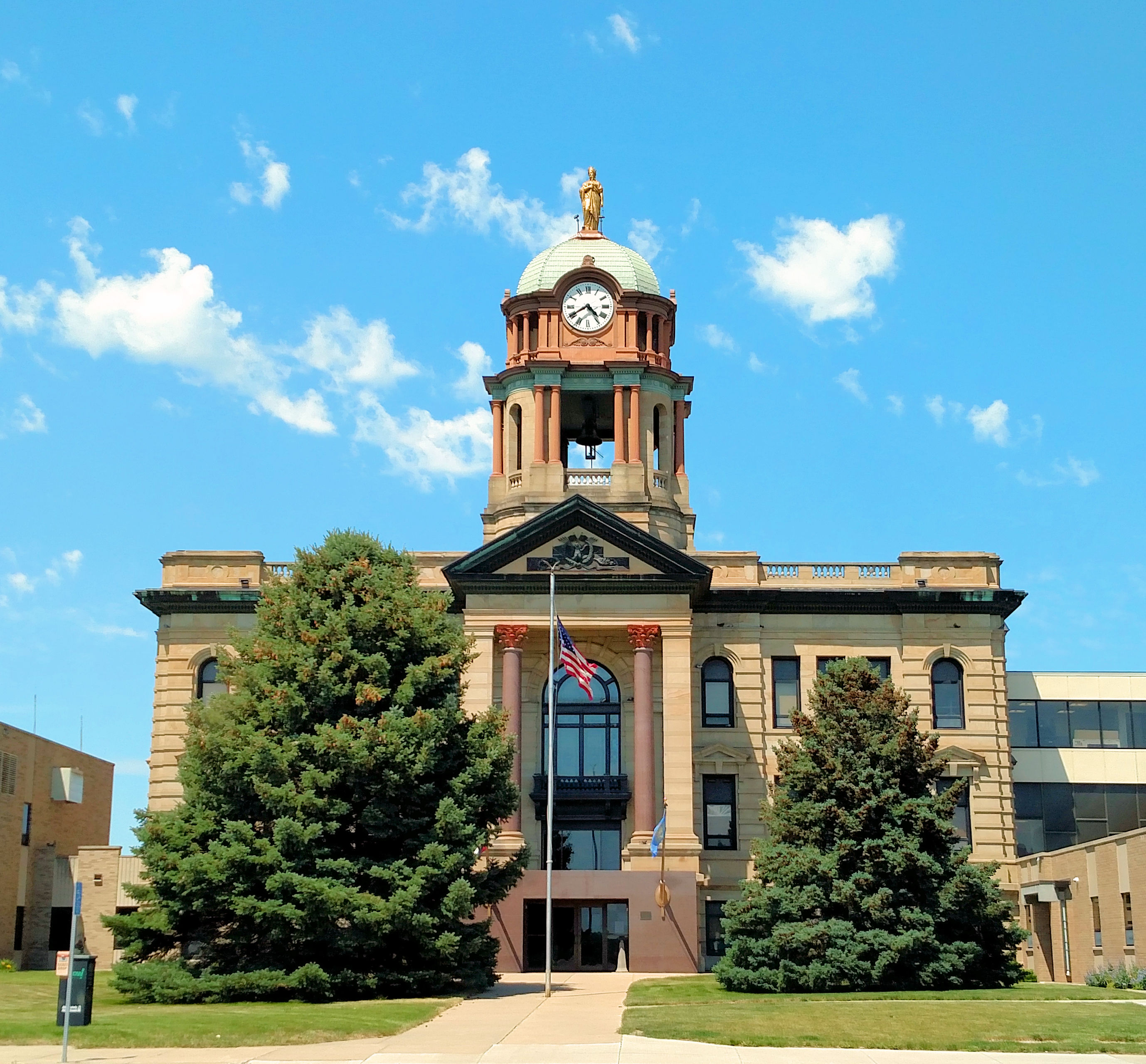
Courthouse in 2017, showing first floor entrance

Columbia, South Dakota, was the site of Brown County's first courthouse until 1887 when Aberdeen became the county seat. A dispute followed, and the county seat moved back to Columbia from November 1889 until 1890, after which Aberdeen permanently became the county seat. After becoming the county seat, a wood frame courthouse building was built in Aberdeen.

Work on a new courthouse in Aberdeen began by 1902, designed by architects Frank W. Kinney and Menno S. Detweiler. It was built by E. Miller of Le Mars, Iowa, and completed in 1904 at a cost of around $120,000. Two half blocks of land were donated by several property owners and a street was removed for the courthouse site. The courthouse was formally dedicated on March 15, 1904. The old courthouse was demolished in 1905 and the site was turned into a park.

In 1974, the sandstone stairway that led to the second floor entrance was removed to improve accessibility; it was replaced by a plate glass entrance on the first floor. The courthouse was listed on the National Register of Historic Places on June 3, 1976. In 2014, after suffering deterioration, the stained glass window around the old entrance was removed, cleaned, and reinstalled.

== Architecture ==
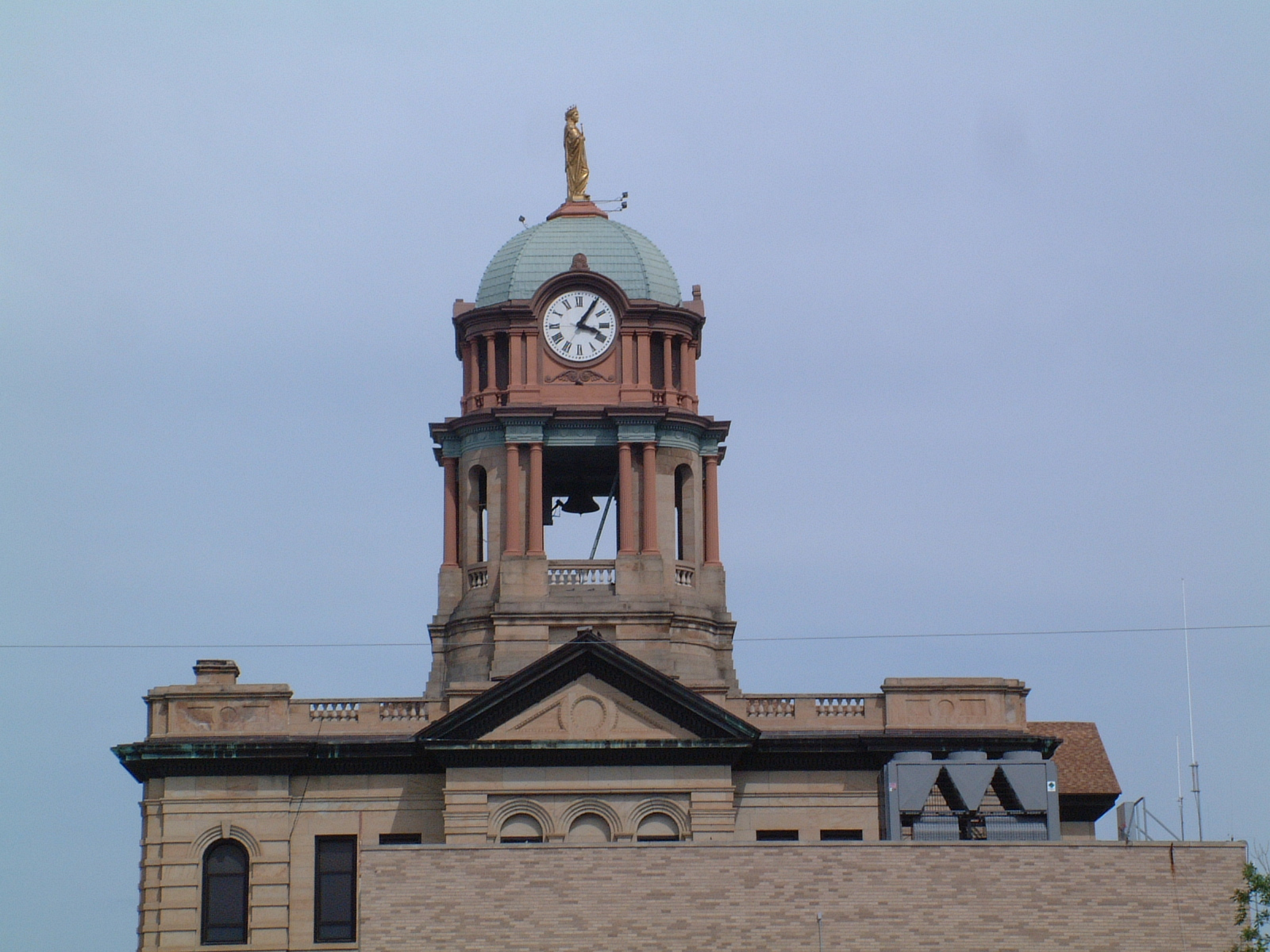
The dome, one clock face, and statue of Justice as seen from the west

The courthouse is a three-story building in the Renaissance Revival style. The building is made of Berea Sandstone that was quarried near Cleveland, Ohio. The front facade faces south and is divided into thirteen bays. The entrance is flanked by two 20-foot-tall (6.1 m) Corinthian columns made of Ortonville granite. The original second-floor entrance is encircled by a two-story-tall arch of stained glass. The building is topped by a dome with four clocks facing each of north, south, east and west. On top of the dome is a copper statue of Justice.

The courthouse originally stood alone on the block; later on an addition was built at the southwest corner for more offices and a jail was built at the southeast corner.

== See also ==
- National Register of Historic Places listings in Brown County, South Dakota
- List of courthouses in the United States § South Dakota
