= Aberdeen micropolitan area =

The Aberdeen micropolitan area may refer to:

- The Aberdeen, South Dakota micropolitan area, US
- The Aberdeen, Washington micropolitan area, US

== See also ==
- Aberdeen (disambiguation)
