= Putney (disambiguation) =

Putney is a district in the London Borough of Wandsworth. It may also refer to:

== Places ==
=== United Kingdom ===
- Putney (UK Parliament constituency), in London
- Putney Bridge, a bridge over the River Thames at Putney
  - Putney Bridge tube station, north of the bridge in Fulham
- Putney railway station, a national rail station
- East Putney tube station, on the District Line
- Putney (London County Council constituency)

=== United States ===
- Putney, Connecticut, a neighborhood of Stratford, Connecticut
- Putney, Georgia, an unincorporated community
- Putney, Kentucky, an unincorporated community
- Putney, South Dakota, an unincorporated community
- Putney, Vermont, a New England town
  - Putney (CDP), Vermont, the main village in the town
- Putney, West Virginia, an unincorporated community
- The Putney School, a private high school located in Putney, Vermont

=== Elsewhere ===
- Putney, New South Wales, Australia, a suburb of Sydney

== People ==
- Putney Dandridge (1902–1946), American jazz pianist and singer
- Ann-Maree Putney, Australian ten-pin bowler
- J.T. Putney (1928–2001), American race car driver
- John Putney (born 1944), Iowa politician
- Lacey E. Putney (1928–2017), Virginia politician
- Martha Settle Putney (1916–2008), American educator and historian
- Mary Jo Putney, American romance author, also publishing as M.J. Putney
- Michael Putney, American political reporter and columnist
- Michael Putney (bishop) (1946–2014), of the Diocese of Townsville in North Queensland, Australia
- Raphiael Putney (born 1990), American basketball player for Maccabi Haifa of the Israeli National League
- Snell Putney (1929–2009), American sociologist, environmentalist and author
- Trevor Putney (born 1960), English former professional footballer
- Will Putney, American music producer, mixer and engineer
- Hugh Jenkins, Baron Jenkins of Putney (1908–2004), British politician, Labour Party member

== Film ==
- Putney Swope, a 1969 film written and directed by Robert Downey, Sr.

== Other ==
- EMS VCS 3, an early British synthesizer referred to as "The Putney"
