= Tacoma Park, South Dakota =

Unincorporated community in South Dakota, U.S.

Coordinates: 45°32′35″N 98°14′49″W

Tacoma Park is an unincorporated community in Brown County, in the U.S. state of South Dakota.

== History ==
1914–1951. Tacoma Park derives its name from Tacoma, Washington, and on account of the wooded town site.
