= Liberty Township, Brown County, South Dakota =

Township in Brown County, South Dakota

Coordinates: 45°53′41″N 98°17′24″W

Liberty Township is a civil township in Brown County, South Dakota, United States.

== Geography ==
Liberty is larger than a normal SD township. It is composed of approximately 48 square miles of land and water. The civil sownship's area of extends from the ND/SD state line south to 106th St. and from 394th Ave. east to the James River. It can also be described as the aggregate of South Dakota political township-128-N by range-62-W and also the portion of township-128-N by range-61-W west of the James River.

The US Department of the Interior owns almost 1,500 acres of land located within Liberty Township as part of the Sand Lake Wetland Management District. About 1,200 of these acres are located within the Sand Lake National Wildlife Refuge area with restricted public access.

== Demographics ==
According to April 2012 Liberty Township Government estimates, there are 56 permanent residents of Liberty Township. There are no documented population centers (towns or cities) located within the civil boundaries. The township has an arithmetic population density of 1.2 people per square mile.
