= Kermit Wahl =

American baseball player (1922–1987)

- Third baseman
- Born: November 18, 1922; Columbia, South Dakota, U.S.
- Died: September 16, 1987 (aged 64); Tucson, Arizona, U.S.
- Batted: Right Threw: Right

MLB debut
- June 23, 1944, for the Cincinnati Reds

Last MLB appearance
- July 29, 1951, for the St. Louis Browns

MLB statistics
- Batting average: .226
- Home runs: 3
- Runs batted in: 50
- Stats at Baseball Reference

Teams
- Cincinnati Reds (1944–1945, 1947); Philadelphia Athletics (1950–1951); St. Louis Browns (1951)

Kermit Emerson Wahl (November 18, 1922 – September 16, 1987) was an American professional baseball player. An infielder, he played all or parts of five seasons in Major League Baseball between 1944 and 1951 for the Cincinnati Reds, Philadelphia Athletics and St. Louis Browns, getting into 231 games. Wahl threw and batted right-handed, and stood 5 feet 11 inches (1.80 m) tall and weighed 170 pounds (77 kg).

== Early life ==
Wahl was born in Columbia, South Dakota, graduated from high school in that town, and attended Indiana University Bloomington. He was signed off the Indiana University campus by the Reds in 1944 during the World War II manpower shortage and made his major league debut as a pinch runner and pinch hitter during four early summer games. In his first big-league at bat, he popped out on July 2 against Johnny Allen of the New York Giants; he stayed in the game at third base, but handled no chances in the field. Wahl also spent part of the 1944 season with the Reds' Class A1 affiliate, the Birmingham Barons of the Southern Association.

== Playing career ==
The 1945 campaign was one of three full seasons Wahl spent at the major league level. He appeared in 71 games for the Reds, starting 28 games at shortstop and 27 at second base, and batted .201 with 39 hits. On August 21, he had three hits in four at bats, including a double and two triples, but the Reds fell to the Philadelphia Phillies, 6–3, at Shibe Park. With the war over and major leaguers returning from military service, Wahl spent all of 1946 with the Triple-A Syracuse Chiefs, where he played shortstop and batted .271 in 109 games. That led to another major league trial, and Wahl made the 1947 Reds as a backup third baseman and utility infielder, but he could muster only 14 hits all season and he batted only .173 in 39 games. However, one of those hits was his first big-league home run, a two-run blow off Howie Pollet of the St. Louis Cardinals on June 27 at Sportsman's Park.

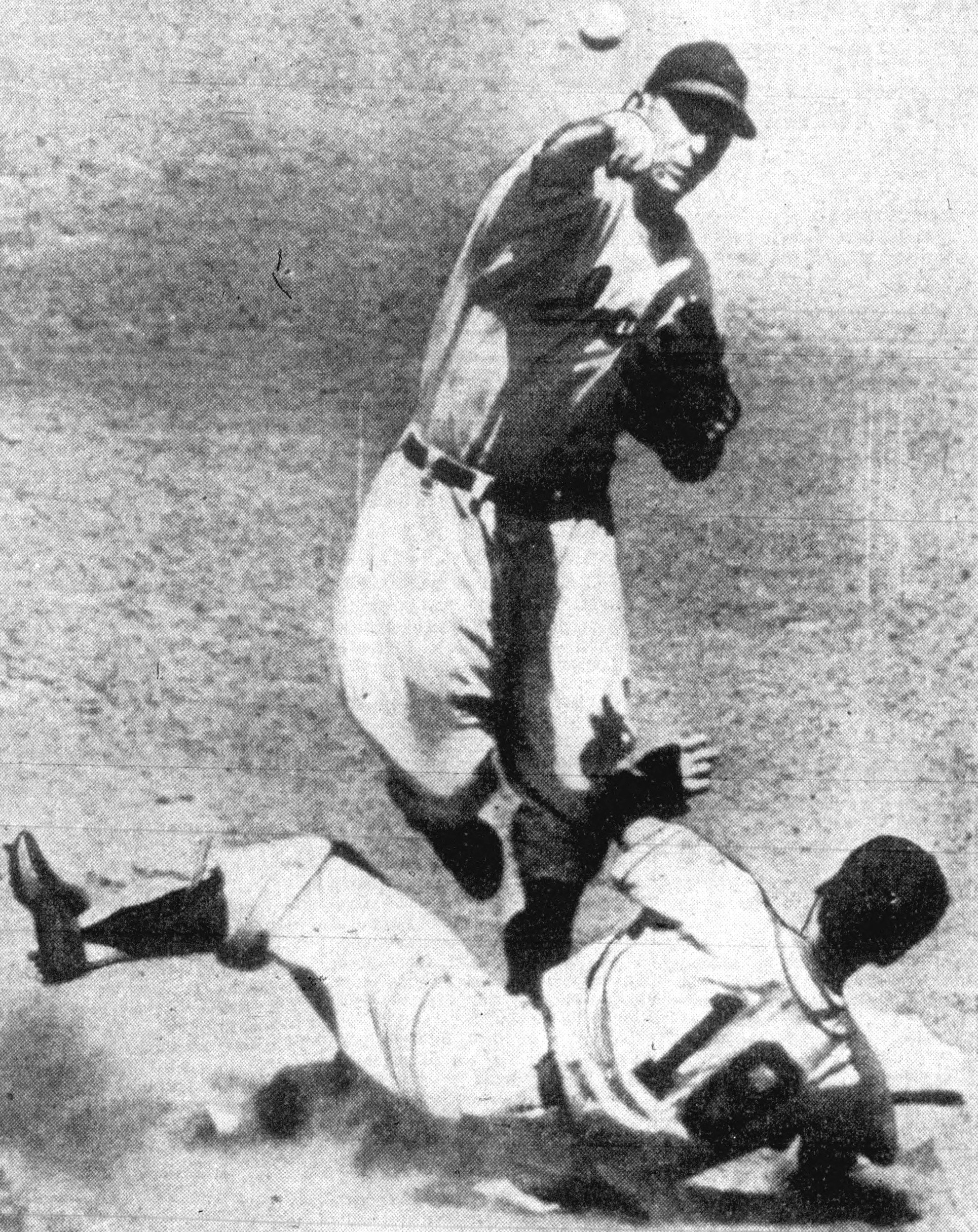
Cleveland Indians second baseman Joe Gordon makes the force out on Philadelphia Athletics third baseman Kermit Wahl during a game on July 27, 1950 at Cleveland Municipal Stadium

Wahl played in the Triple-A International League during the following two seasons, and was acquired by the Athletics from the Brooklyn Dodgers' organization after he batted .286 in 134 games for the 1949 Montreal Royals. The 1950 season, his third and last full season in the big leagues, represented the high-water mark of his pro career. He reached career highs in games played (89), runs scored (26), hits (72), doubles (12), triples (3), homers (2), runs batted in (27), and batting average (.257). He became the Athletics' regular third baseman in July, after Bob Dillinger was sold to the Pittsburgh Pirates, and started 60 games at the hot corner through September 17.

Wahl was not able to hold the starting third base job in 1951, batting .186 in 20 games, and was traded, via the Chicago White Sox, to the St. Louis Browns on June 4. Although he batted .333 in limited service for the Browns, he was traded for the third time that season, on July 31 to the New York Yankees in a waiver deal. However, he did not play at the major league level for the Yankees; he was sent to the Triple-A Kansas City Blues and spent the remainder of his playing career in the American Association, retiring after the 1954 season.

As a major leaguer, Wahl registered 145 hits, including 23 doubles, six triples, and three home runs.

== Later years ==
In retirement, Wahl became a teacher and coach in his native South Dakota, eventually becoming a college administrator there and in Arizona, where he relocated in 1975. He died from cancer, age 64, in Tucson.
