= Rudolph, South Dakota =

Unincorporated community in South Dakota, U.S.

Coordinates: 45°20′53″N 98°32′10″W

Rudolph is an unincorporated community in Brown County, in the U.S. state of South Dakota.

== History ==
Rudolph was laid out in 1881. It was named for H. Rudolph McCullough, a railroad official. A post office called Rudolph was established in 1883, and remained in operation until it was discontinued in 1908.
