= Hecla, South Dakota =

- City
- Logo

- Location in Brown County and the state of South Dakota
- Coordinates: 45°52′56″N 98°09′07″W
- Country: United States
- State: South Dakota
- County: Brown
- Founded: 1886
- Incorporated: 1890

Area
  - Total: 0.34 sq mi (0.89 km^{2})
  - Land: 0.34 sq mi (0.89 km^{2})
  - Water: 0 sq mi (0.00 km^{2})
- Elevation: 1,303 ft (397 m)

Population (2020)
  - Total: 193
  - Density: 560.4/sq mi (216.39/km^{2})
- Time zone: UTC-6 (Central (CST))
  - Summer (DST): UTC-5 (CDT)
- ZIP code: 57446
- Area code: 605
- FIPS code: 46-27980
- GNIS feature ID: 1267416

Hecla is a city in Brown County, South Dakota, United States, located only a few miles south of the North Dakota border. The population was 193 at the 2020 census. State Highway 37 runs along the east side of town.

== History ==
Hecla was platted in 1886. It was named after Hekla, a stratovolcano in Iceland. A post office has been in operation in Hecla since 1886. Hecla was the first place in South Dakota to have a soil conservation district.

== Geography ==
According to the United States Census Bureau, the city has a total area of 0.34 square miles (0.88 km^{2}), all land.

The Civil Township of Hecla (which includes a portion of South Dakota political township-128-N by range-61-W east of the James River) surrounds the municipal boundary of the City of Hecla. Liberty Township is located to west of the City of Hecla and includes a portion of South Dakota political township-128-N by range-61-W west of the James River in addition to township-128-N by range-62-W.

== Demographics ==
Historical population
| Census | Pop. | Note | %± |
|---|---|---|---|
| 1900 | 160 | | — |
| 1910 | 462 | | 188.8% |
| 1920 | 553 | | 19.7% |
| 1930 | 558 | | 0.9% |
| 1940 | 555 | | −0.5% |
| 1950 | 500 | | −9.9% |
| 1960 | 444 | | −11.2% |
| 1970 | 407 | | −8.3% |
| 1980 | 435 | | 6.9% |
| 1990 | 398 | | −8.5% |
| 2000 | 314 | | −21.1% |
| 2010 | 227 | | −27.7% |
| 2020 | 193 | | −15.0% |
U.S. Decennial Census

=== 2020 census ===
As of the 2020 census, Hecla had a population of 193. The median age was 62.6 years. 14.5% of residents were under the age of 18 and 38.9% of residents were 65 years of age or older.

For every 100 females there were 85.6 males, and for every 100 females age 18 and over there were 94.1 males age 18 and over.

0.0% of residents lived in urban areas, while 100.0% lived in rural areas.

There were 108 households in Hecla, of which 14.8% had children under the age of 18 living in them. Of all households, 50.9% were married-couple households, 18.5% were households with a male householder and no spouse or partner present, and 25.9% were households with a female householder and no spouse or partner present. About 39.8% of all households were made up of individuals and 21.3% had someone living alone who was 65 years of age or older.

There were 156 housing units, of which 30.8% were vacant. The homeowner vacancy rate was 1.0% and the rental vacancy rate was 11.1%.

Racial composition as of the 2020 census
| Race | Number | Percent |
|---|---|---|
| White | 186 | 96.4% |
| Black or African American | 0 | 0.0% |
| American Indian and Alaska Native | 0 | 0.0% |
| Asian | 2 | 1.0% |
| Native Hawaiian and Other Pacific Islander | 0 | 0.0% |
| Some other race | 0 | 0.0% |
| Two or more races | 5 | 2.6% |
| Hispanic or Latino (of any race) | 3 | 1.6% |

=== 2010 census ===
As of the census of 2010, there were 227 people, 127 households, and 69 families living in the city. The population density was 667.6 inhabitants per square mile (257.8/km^{2}). There were 155 housing units at an average density of 455.9 per square mile (176.0/km^{2}). The racial makeup of the city was 97.4% White, 0.4% Asian, 0.4% from other races, and 1.8% from two or more races. Hispanic or Latino of any race were 1.3% of the population.

There were 127 households, of which 11.8% had children under the age of 18 living with them, 50.4% were married couples living together, 1.6% had a female householder with no husband present, 2.4% had a male householder with no wife present, and 45.7% were non-families. 40.2% of all households were made up of individuals, and 22.8% had someone living alone who was 65 years of age or older. The average household size was 1.79 and the average family size was 2.35.

The median age in the city was 57.1 years. 11% of residents were under the age of 18; 2.3% were between the ages of 18 and 24; 11% were from 25 to 44; 41.5% were from 45 to 64; and 34.4% were 65 years of age or older. The gender makeup of the city was 47.6% male and 52.4% female.

=== 2000 census ===
As of the census of 2000, there were 314 people, 147 households, and 93 families living in the city. The population density was 923.2 inhabitants per square mile (356.4/km^{2}). There were 170 housing units at an average density of 499.8 per square mile (193.0/km^{2}). The racial makeup of the city was 99.04% White, 0.32% Native American, and 0.64% from two or more races.

There were 147 households, out of which 21.1% had children under the age of 18 living with them, 55.1% were married couples living together, 6.8% had a female householder with no husband present, and 36.1% were non-families. 34.0% of all households were made up of individuals, and 19.0% had someone living alone who was 65 years of age or older. The average household size was 2.14 and the average family size was 2.71.

In the city, the population was spread out, with 20.1% under the age of 18, 5.1% from 18 to 24, 19.7% from 25 to 44, 25.5% from 45 to 64, and 29.6% who were 65 years of age or older. The median age was 48 years. For every 100 females, there were 91.5 males. For every 100 females age 18 and over, there were 91.6 males.

The median income for a household in the city was $25,375, and the median income for a family was $42,656. Males had a median income of $27,500 versus $16,042 for females. The per capita income for the city was $14,775. About 2.2% of families and 3.3% of the population were below the poverty line, including 2.7% of those under age 18 and 7.1% of those age 65 or over.

== Notable individuals ==
- Actress January Jones lived in Hecla from infancy until she was 10 years old, although she was born in Sioux Falls and moved there to attend high school.
