= Randolph, South Dakota =

Unincorporated community in South Dakota, U.S.

Coordinates: 45°14′34″N 98°12′35″W

Randolph
- Unincorporated community
- Location in South Dakota
- Country: United States
- State: South Dakota
- County: Brown
- Laid out: 1906
- Post office closed: 1953
- Time zone: UTC-6 (Central)
  - Summer (DST): UTC-5 (CDT)
- Area code: 605

Randolph is an unincorporated community in Brown County, in the U.S. state of South Dakota.

== History ==
Randolph was laid out in 1906, and named for John Randolph, who was scalped by Indians near that point. A post office called Randolph was established in 1908, and remained in operation until 1953.
