= Sand Lake National Wildlife Refuge =

Protected area in South Dakota, U.S.

- IUCN category IV (habitat/species management area)
- Location within South Dakota Location within the United States
- Location: Brown County, South Dakota, U.S.
- Nearest city: Aberdeen, South Dakota
- Coordinates: 45°46′21″N 98°15′9″W
- Area: 21,498 acres (8,700 ha)
- Established: 1935
- Governing body: U.S. Fish and Wildlife Service
- Website: Sand Lake NWR

Ramsar Wetland
- Designated: 3 August 1998
- Reference no.: 957

Sand Lake National Wildlife Refuge is located in the northeastern part of the U.S. state of South Dakota and is administered by the U.S. Fish and Wildlife Service. Created in 1935, it is a wetland of international importance and a Globally Important Bird Area. Over 260 bird species are found in the refuge, including many migratory bird species and the world's largest breeding colony of Franklin's gulls.

== History and management ==
In the late 1880s, the Sand Lake area was settled by farmers. Their agricultural practices depleted wildlife habitat and caused a severe decline in waterfowl numbers. The US Congress established the refuge in 1935 to preserve wildlife habitat and breeding grounds.

The Sand Lake National Wildlife Refuge is located in northeastern South Dakota, and covers 21,498 acres (8,700 ha) of wildlife habitat. It is part of the National Wildlife Refuge System, which covers over 550 such refuges in the US. The system is managed by the US Fish and Wildlife Service, part of the Department of the Interior. The Sand Lake Wetland Management District, which focuses on the conservation of wetland and grassland habitat on private property, is run through the wildlife refuge. The program is the largest such district in the country, and manages properties in eight counties. The refuge hosts around 75,000 visitors annually.

== Wetlands ==
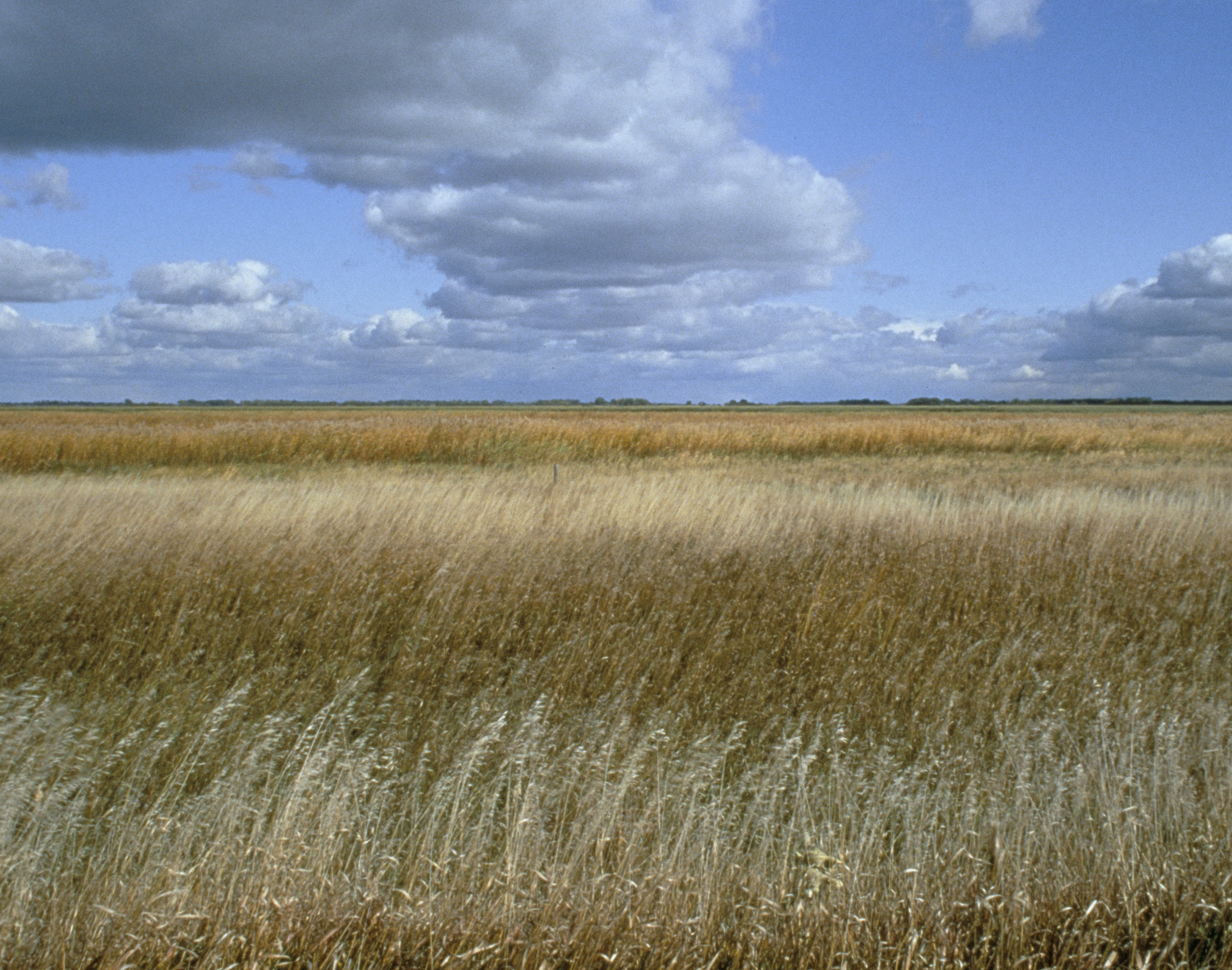
Sand Lake National Wildlife Refuge wetlands

Sand Lake National Wildlife Refuge is one of the refuges included in the list of wetlands of international importance under the Ramsar Convention, which was signed in 1971 and entered into force in the US in 1987. It is one of 35 such sites in the US, which cover a total of 4,515,100 acres (1,827,196 ha). Sand Lake was designated on August 3, 1998 and covers 21,000 acres (8,700 ha). As a "large freshwater cattail marsh", it was selected as a refuge due to being a "critical nesting and staging habitat" for numerous species of birds, including tens of thousands of migrating waterfowl. The wetlands are a popular tourist attraction, with thousands of visitors each year.

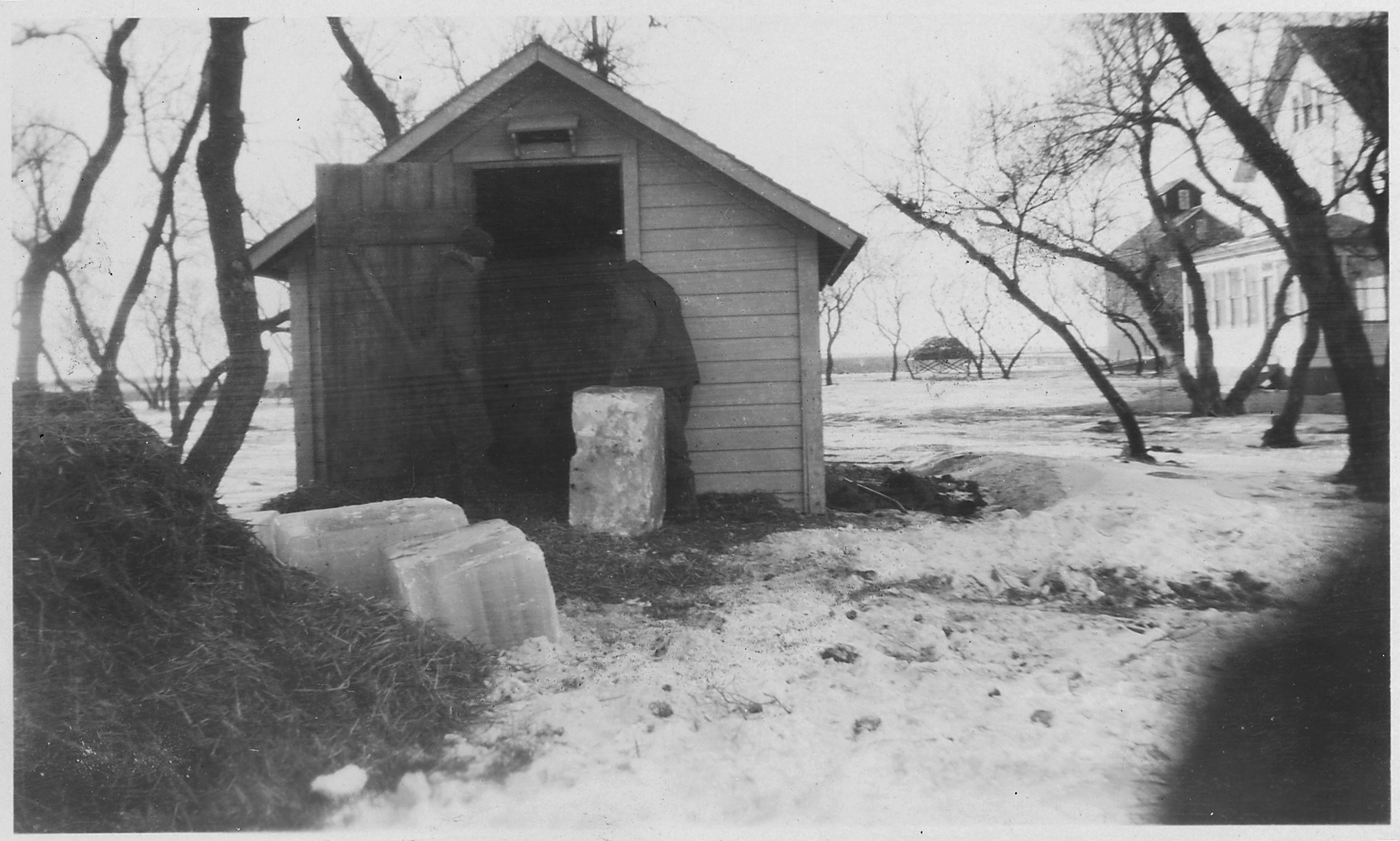
Cutting ice at Sand Lake National Wildlife Refuge with the Civilian Conservation Corps

== Flora and fauna ==
Large concentrations of more than 260 bird species, 40 mammals and a variety of other species live in the refuge. WildBird Magazine called Sand Lake one of North America's top 15 sites for bird watching. Mallard ducks, wood ducks and Canada geese are frequently seen, as are Western grebes, white pelicans and snow geese. The largest nesting colony of Franklin's gulls in the world is also found in Sand Lake. The Sand Lake National Wildlife Refuge had been designated as a Globally Important Bird Area by the American Bird Conservancy, one of 500 such sites in the US and approximately 3,500 worldwide. It is one of two such sites in South Dakota, with the other being the Fort Pierre National Grassland.

The main waterway in the refuge is the James River, which feeds Sand Lake and Mud Lake. The lakes were created by the Civilian Conservation Corps during the New Deal Era, as they built dams on local rivers. The refuge and the James River were considered infested with Zebra mussels as 2023.
