= Derrek Tuszka =

American football player (born 1996)

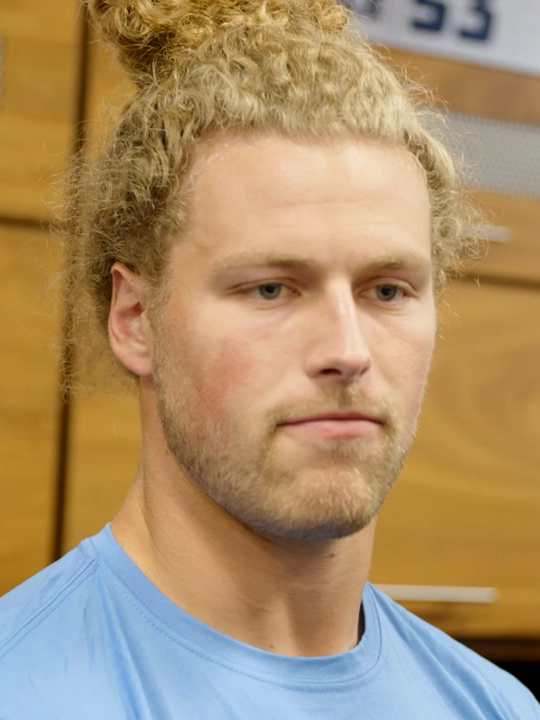
- Tuszka in 2022

No. 48, 59
- Position: Linebacker

Personal information
- Born: July 11, 1996 (age 30); Warner, South Dakota, U.S.
- Listed height: 6 ft 4 in (1.93 m)
- Listed weight: 246 lb (112 kg)

Career information
- High school: Warner
- College: North Dakota State (2015–2019)
- NFL draft: 2020: 7th round, 254th overall pick

Career history
- Denver Broncos (2020); Pittsburgh Steelers (2021); Tennessee Titans (2022); Los Angeles Chargers (2022)

Awards and highlights
- 4× FCS national champion (2015, 2017, 2018, 2019); Unanimous FCS All-American (2019); First-team All-MVFC (2019); MVFC Defensive Player of the Year (2019)

Career NFL statistics
- Total tackles: 40
- Sacks: 2
- Forced fumbles: 1
- Stats at Pro Football Reference

Derrek Tuszka (born July 11, 1996) is an American former professional football player who was a linebacker in the National Football League (NFL). He played college football for the North Dakota State Bison.

== Early life ==
Tuszka attended Warner High School in Warner, South Dakota. He committed to North Dakota State on April 22, 2014.

== College career ==
Tuszka played college football at North Dakota State University, where he was a three-year starter. As a senior in 2019, he recorded 48 tackles including 19 tackles for loss, 13.5 sacks, one forced fumble, and five passes defensed. Tuszka was named a Football Championship Subdivision first-team All-American as well as the Missouri Valley Football Conference Defensive Player of the Year. In his collegiate career he started 34 of the 53 games in which he appeared and compiled 133 tackles, 42 tackles for loss, 29.5 sacks, three forced fumbles, and six passes defensed.

== Professional career ==
Pre-draft measurables
| Height | Weight | Arm length | Hand span | 40-yard dash | 10-yard split | 20-yard split | 20-yard shuttle | Three-cone drill | Vertical jump | Broad jump | Bench press |
|---|---|---|---|---|---|---|---|---|---|---|---|
| 6 ft 4 1/2 in (1.94 m) | 251 lb (114 kg) | 31 3/8 in (0.80 m) | 9 7/8 in (0.25 m) | 4.79 s | 1.70 s | 2.78 s | 4.34 s | 6.87 s | 33.5 in (0.85 m) | 10 ft 0 in (3.05 m) | 24 reps |
All values from NFL Combine

=== Denver Broncos ===
Tuszka was selected by the Denver Broncos with the 254th overall pick in the seventh round of the 2020 NFL draft. He was waived on September 5, 2020, and was signed to the practice squad the following day. He was elevated to the active roster on September 14 for the team's Week 1 game against the Tennessee Titans, and reverted to the practice squad the next day. He was elevated again on September 19 for the team's Week 2 game against the Pittsburgh Steelers, and reverted to the practice squad again after the game. Tuszka was promoted to the active roster on September 30. He was placed on injured reserve on October 27, with a hamstring injury. On December 12, Tuszka was activated off of injured reserve.

On August 31, 2021, Tuszka was waived by the Broncos.

=== Pittsburgh Steelers ===
On September 1, 2021, Tuszka was signed to the Pittsburgh Steelers' practice squad. He was promoted on September 28. Tuszka made 15 appearances from the Steelers, compiling one forced fumble, two sacks, and 18 combined tackles. He was released by the Steelers on September 1, 2022.

=== Tennessee Titans ===
On September 2, 2022, Tuszka was claimed off waivers by the Tennessee Titans. He was waived by the Titans on September 26.

=== Los Angeles Chargers ===
On September 28, 2022, Tuszka was claimed off waivers by the Los Angeles Chargers. Tuszka made 14 appearances for Los Angeles, recording 14 combined tackles.
