= Demographics of South Dakota =

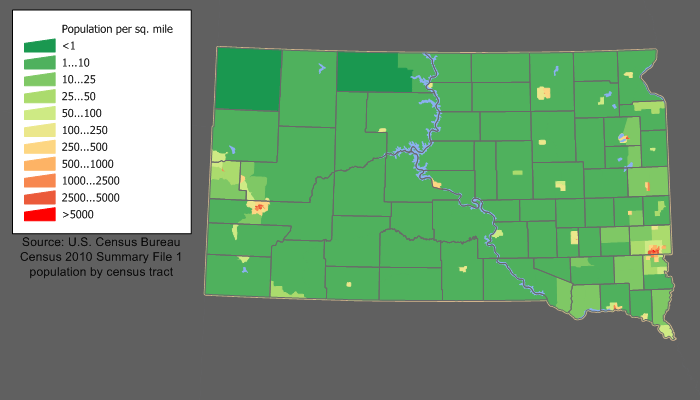
South Dakota Population Density Map

South Dakota is the 46th-most populous U.S. state; in 2019, the U.S. Census Bureau estimated a population of about 884,659. The majority of South Dakotans are White, and the largest religion is Christianity. In 2010, 93.46% of the population spoke English as their primary language.

== Population ==
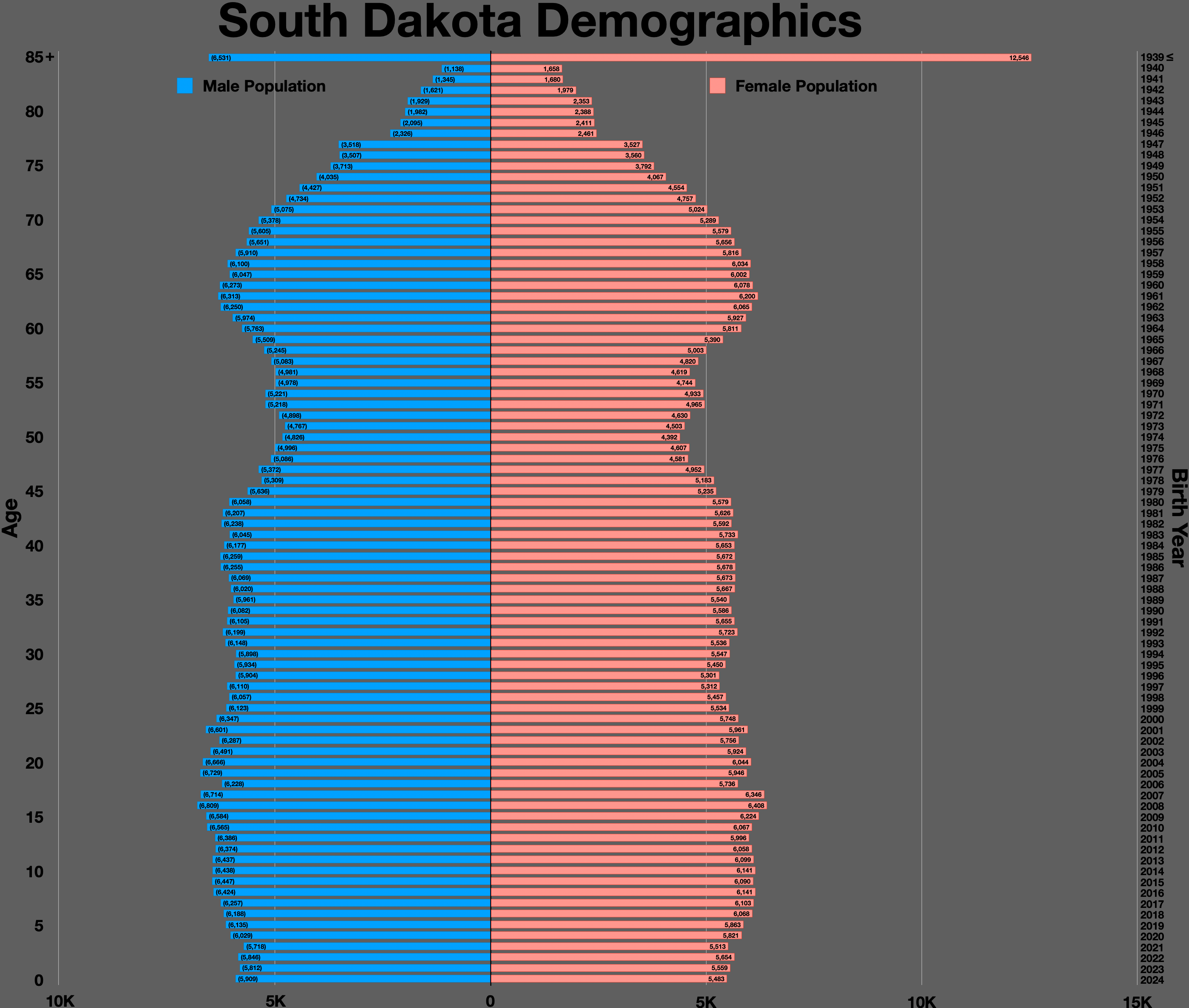
South Dakota population pyramid

According to the U.S. Census Bureau, as of 2012, South Dakota has an estimated population of 833,354, which is an increase of 2.4% from 2010. Females made up approximately 49.8% of the population. In 2011, 2.4% of the population was foreign born. In the same year, there were 71,125 veterans. The center of population of South Dakota is located in Buffalo County, in the unincorporated county seat of Gann Valley.

== Growth and rural flight ==
Historical population
Census	Pop.	Note	%±
1860	4,837		—
1870	11,776		143.5%
1880	98,268		734.5%
1890	348,600		254.7%
1900	401,570		15.2%
1910	583,888		45.4%
1920	636,547		9.0%
1930	692,849		8.8%
1940	642,961		−7.2%
1950	652,740		1.5%
1960	680,514		4.3%
1970	665,507		−2.2%
1980	690,768		3.8%
1990	696,004		0.8%
2000	754,844		8.5%
2010	814,180		7.9%
2020	886,667		8.9%
2025 (est.)	935,094		5.5%
Sources: 1910–2020, 2025

South Dakota, in common with five other nearby states (Nebraska, Kansas, Oklahoma, North Dakota, and Iowa), is experiencing a trend of falling populations in rural counties. 89% of the total number of cities in these six states have fewer than 3,000 people; hundreds have fewer than 1000. Between 1996 and 2004, almost half a million people, nearly half with college degrees, left the six states. "Rural flight" as it is called has led to offers of free land and tax breaks as enticements to newcomers.

The effect of rural flight has not been spread evenly through South Dakota, however. Although most rural counties and small towns have lost population, the Sioux Falls area and the Black Hills have gained population. In fact, Lincoln County, near Sioux Falls, is the ninth-fastest-growing county (by percentage) in the United States. The growth in these areas has compensated for losses in the rest of the state, and South Dakota's total population continues to increase steadily, albeit at a slower rate than the national average.

A one-night stay in South Dakota is all that is necessary to qualify a person to claim residency in South Dakota. Residency in South Dakota has therefore become very popular among full-time travelers (persons who reside in recreational vehicles, aboard cruise ships, etc.).

=== Vital statistics ===
Note: Births in table don't add up, because Hispanics are counted both by their ethnicity and by their race, giving a higher overall number.

Live Births by Single Race/Ethnicity of Mother
Race	2014	2015	2016	2017	2018	2019	2020	2021	2022	2023	2024
White	9,122 (74.2%)	9,063 (73.5%)	8,837 (72.0%)	8,620 (71.0%)	8,481 (71.3%)	8,154 (71.2%)	7,740 (70.6%)	8,111 (71.3%)	8,008 (71.5%)	8,003 (71.4%)	8,110 (70.8%)
American Indian	2,055 (16.7%)	2,166 (17.5%)	1,788 (14.6%)	1,807 (14.9%)	1,652 (13.9%)	1,613 (14.1%)	1,501 (13.7%)	1,525 (13.4%)	1,463 (13.1%)	1,362 (12.2%)	1,400 (12.2%)
Black	356 (2.9%)	344 (2.8%)	363 (3.0%)	398 (3.3%)	416 (3.5%)	416 (3.6%)	390 (3.5%)	385 (3.4%)	362 (3.2%)	345 (3.0%)	367 (3.2%)
Asian	271 (2.2%)	322 (2.6%)	269 (2.2%)	248 (2.0%)	224 (1.9%)	206 (1.8%)	215 (2.0%)	202 (1.8%)	191 (1.7%)	207 (1.8%)	196 (1.7%)
Hispanic (any race)	603 (4.9%)	559 (4.5%)	634 (5.2%)	624 (5.1%)	661 (5.6%)	642 (5.6%)	660 (6.0%)	695 (6.1%)	726 (6.5%)	836 (7.5%)	966 (8.4%)
Total	12,283 (100%)	12,336 (100%)	12,275 (100%)	12,134 (100%)	11,893 (100%)	11,449 (100%)	10,960 (100%)	11,369 (100%)	11,201 (100%)	11,201 (100%)	11,451 (100%)

- Since 2016, data for births of White Hispanic origin are not collected, but included in one Hispanic group; persons of Hispanic origin may be of any race.

=== Age distribution ===
7.3% of South Dakota's population was reported as under 5 years of age, 24.5% under 18, and 14.7% were 65 or older.

In 2010, the United States Census Bureau reported that the age distribution amongst South Dakotans was:

- Under 5 years: 59,621 (7.3%)
- 5–9 years: 55,531 (6.8%)
- 10–14 years: 53,960 (6.6%)
- 15–19 years: 57,628 (7.1%)
- 20–24 years: 57,596 (7.1%)
- 25–29 years: 55,570 (6.8%)
- 30–34 years: 49,859 (6.1%)
- 35–39 years: 45,766 (5.6%)
- 40–44 years: 47,346 (5.8%)
- 45–49 years: 57,519 (7.1%)
- 50–54 years: 59,399 (7.3%)
- 55–59 years: 54,231 (6.7%)
- 60–64 years: 43,573 (5.4%)
- 65–69 years: 31,944 (3.9%)
- 70–74 years: 25,683 (3.2%)
- 75–79 years: 21,724 (2.7%)
- 80–84 years: 18,004 (2.2%)
- 85 years and older: 19,226 (2.4%)

The median age was 36.9 years.

== Location ==
The largest metropolitan area (MSA) in South Dakota is the Sioux Falls metropolitan area, which consists of the counties of Lincoln, McCook, Minnehaha, and Turner. Its anchor is Sioux Falls. As of 2010, it had a population of 228,261.

The second-largest MSA is the Rapid City metropolitan area, which had an estimated population of 124,766 in 2009. The MSA includes the counties of Pennington and Meade and is anchored to Rapid City.

=== Top 10 Most Populated Counties in 2019 ===
The most populous county in South Dakota is Minnehaha, which has an estimated 193,134 residents. The least populous county is Jones, with a population of about 903.

County	Seat	Projected Population
Minnehaha	Sioux Falls	193,134
Pennington	Rapid City	113,775
Lincoln	Canton	61,128
Brown	Aberdeen	38,839
Brookings	Brookings	35,007
Meade	Sturgis	28,332
Codington	Watertown	28,009
Lawrence	Deadwood	25,844
Yankton	Yankton	22,814
Davison	Mitchell	19,775

== Ethnicity ==
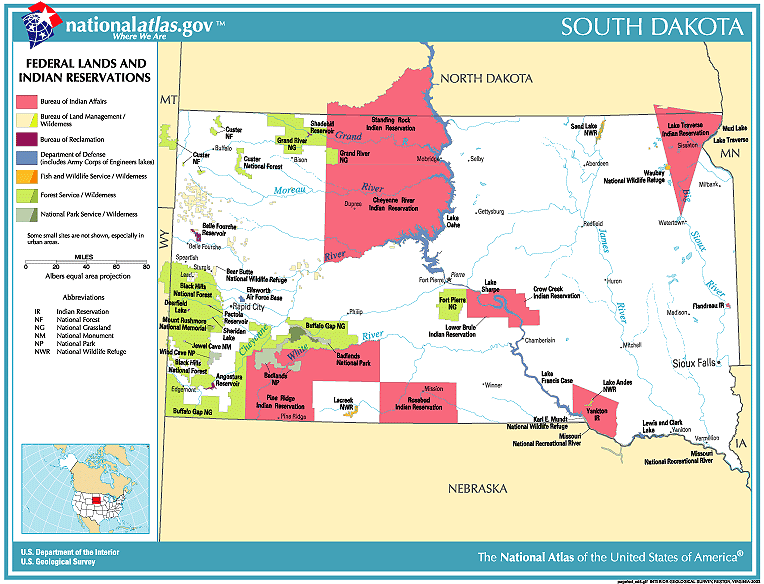
South Dakota has a number of large Indian reservations (shown in pink).

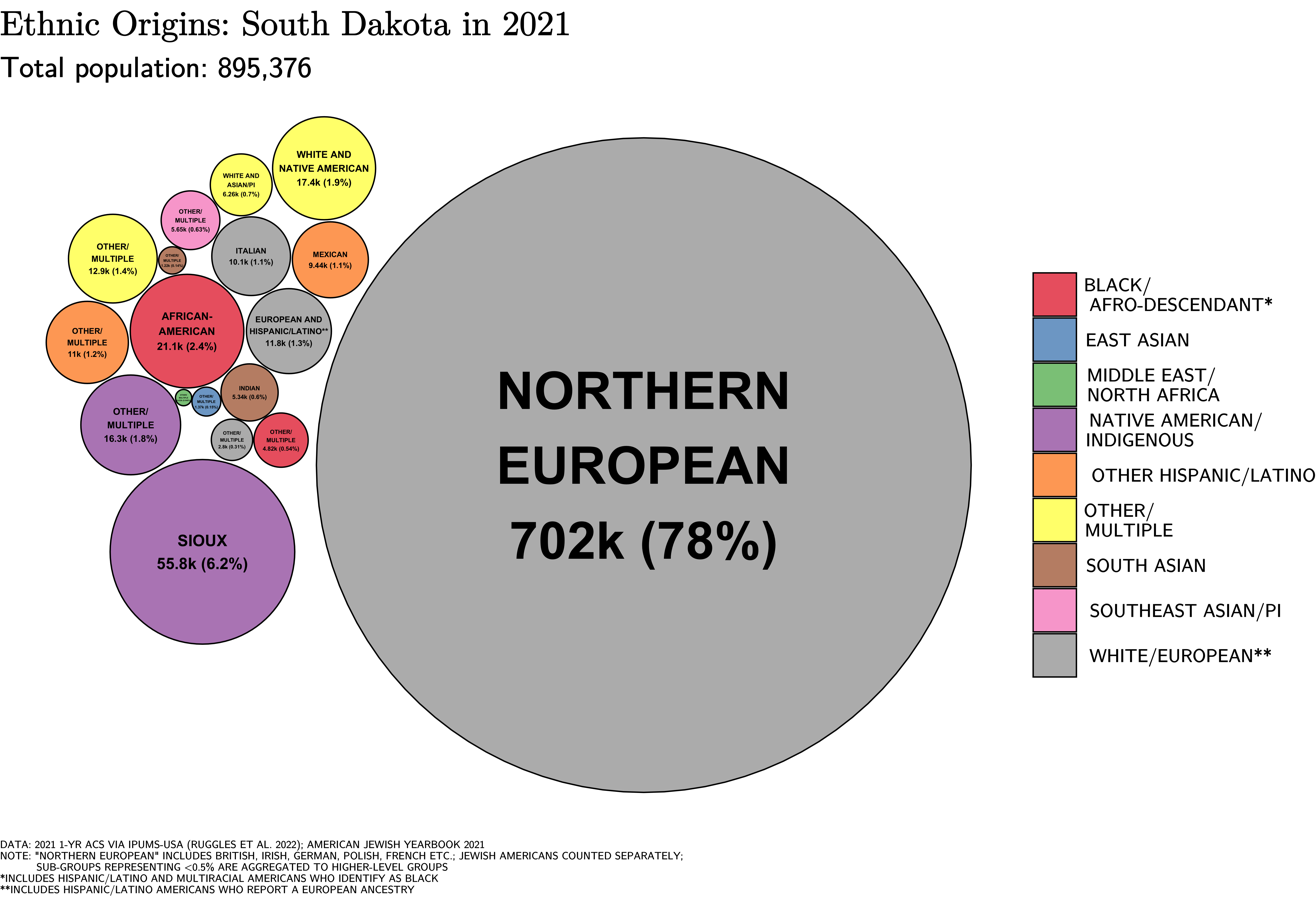
Ethnic origins in South Dakota

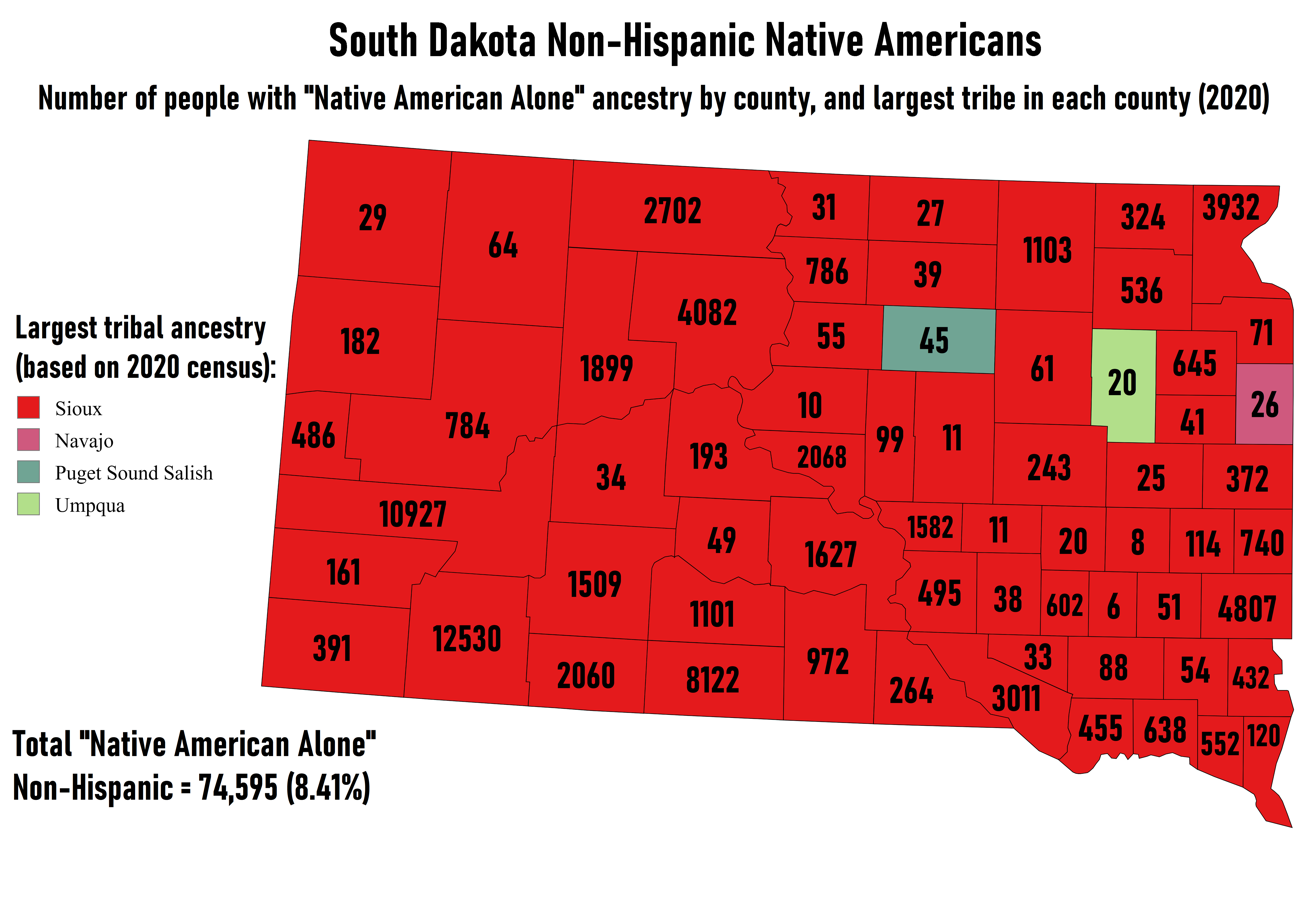
Largest Non-Hispanic Native American ancestry by county and numbers of people reporting "Native American Alone"

In 2012, the Census Bureau estimated that 86.2% of South Dakotans were White, 8.9% were American Indian or Alaskan Native, 3.1% were Hispanic or Latino, 1.7% were Black or African American, 1.1% were Asian, and 0.1% were Pacific Islander or Native Hawaiian. 2.1% of South Dakotans belonged to more than one race.

In 2011, 25.4% of children less than one year old were minorities.

From 2007 to 2011, the American Community Survey estimated that 42.8% (345,951) of South Dakotans were of German ancestry, 14.7% (118,603) were Norwegian, 11.1% (89,912) were Irish, 6.9% (55,425) were English, and 4.9% (39,420) were Dutch.

In the 2000 census, the five largest ancestry groups in South Dakota were: German (40.7%), Norwegian (15.3%), Irish (10.4%), Native American (8.3%), and English (7.1%). German-Americans are the largest ancestry group in most parts of the state, especially in the east, although there are also large Scandinavian populations in some counties.

South Dakota has the nation's largest population of Hutterites, a communal Anabaptist group who emigrated from Europe in 1874. About one hundred Hutterite families came from Russia to Dakota Territory, then left for Canada to escape military conscription during the First World War. Many families returned to South Dakota and today about 35 colonies exist in the state. (Approximately another 40 colonies are in other U.S. states and 200 in Canada.)

American Indians, largely Lakota, Dakota, and Nakota (Sioux) are predominant in several counties. South Dakota has the third highest proportion of Native Americans of any state, behind Alaska and New Mexico. Five of the state's counties lie entirely within Indian reservations. Living standards on many reservations is often very low when compared with the national average. The unemployment rate in Fort Thompson, on the Crow Creek Indian Reservation, is 70%, and 21% of households there lack plumbing or basic kitchen appliances. A 1995 study by the U.S. Census Bureau found that 58% of homes on the Pine Ridge Indian Reservation did not have a telephone.

Demographics of South Dakota (csv)
By race	White	Black	AIAN*	Asian	NHPI*
2000 (total population)	90.36%	0.90%	9.06%	0.80%	0.07%
2000 (Hispanic only)	1.21%	0.04%	0.24%	0.02%	0.01%
2005 (total population)	89.64%	1.17%	9.43%	0.92%	0.06%
2005 (Hispanic only)	1.83%	0.07%	0.23%	0.02%	0.00%
Growth 2000–05 (total population)	1.98%	33.36%	7.02%	17.99%	-9.87%
Growth 2000–05 (non-Hispanic only)	1.25%	31.10%	7.20%	18.58%	-5.69%
Growth 2000–05 (Hispanic only)	55.60%	78.64%	0.17%	-6.21%	-41.54%
* AIAN is American Indian or Alaskan Native; NHPI is Native Hawaiian or Pacific Islander

== Native American tribes ==
What is now South Dakota has been historically inhabited by tribes such as the Sioux, the Cheyenne, the Ponca, the Arikara and the Crow.

The largest Native American tribes in South Dakota according to the 2010 census are listed in the table below:

Tribal groupings with over 100 members in South Dakota in 2010 census
Tribal grouping	American Indian and Alaska Native alone	AIAN in combination with one or more other races	Total AIAN alone or in any combination
Total AIAN population	71817	10256	82073
Sioux	56152	5430	61582
Ojibwe	607	218	825
Cherokee	173	370	543
Cheyenne	348	69	417
MHA Nation	297	39	336
Navajo	250	50	300
Arapaho	167	13	180
Choctaw	84	67	151
Assiniboine Sioux	119	17	136
Blackfeet	83	53	136
Ponca	92	31	123
Crow	78	31	109
Apache	67	36	103
Mexican American Indian	80	22	102
Iroquois	45	56	101
Tribe not specified	12427	3442	15869

== Languages ==
Top 10 Non-English Languages Spoken in South Dakota
Language	Percentage of population (as of 2010)
Spanish	2.06%
Dakota	1.39%
German	1.37%
Vietnamese	0.16%
Chinese (including Cantonese and Mandarin)	0.12%
Russian	0.10%
Amharic and French (tied)	0.09%
Other American Indian and Serbo-Croatian (tied)	0.08%
Tagalog	0.06%
Czech and Korean (tied)	0.05%

As of 2010, 93.46% (692,504) of South Dakota residents aged 5 and older spoke English as their primary language. 6.54% (48,498) of the population spoke a language other than English. 2.06% (15,292) of the population spoke Spanish, 1.39% (10,282) spoke Dakota, and 1.37% (10,140) spoke German. Other languages spoken included Vietnamese (0.16%), Chinese (0.12%), and Russian (0.10%).

Since 2019, "the language of the Great Sioux Nation, comprised of three dialects, Dakota, Lakota, and Nakota" is an official language in the state.

In 2000, 93.65% (658,245) of South Dakota residents spoke English as their first language. 1.91% (13,425) of the population aged 5 or older spoke German, 1.52% (10,675) spoke Dakota, and 1.43% (10,055) spoke Spanish. Another 0.18% spoke French, 0.12% spoke Norwegian, and 0.09% spoke Czech.

From 2000 to 2010, Spanish replaced German as the most common non-English language spoken in South Dakota. Dakota also passed German, making German the third-most common non-English language in the state. The percentage of non-English languages spoken rose from 6.35% in 2000 to 6.56% in 2010.

== Religion ==
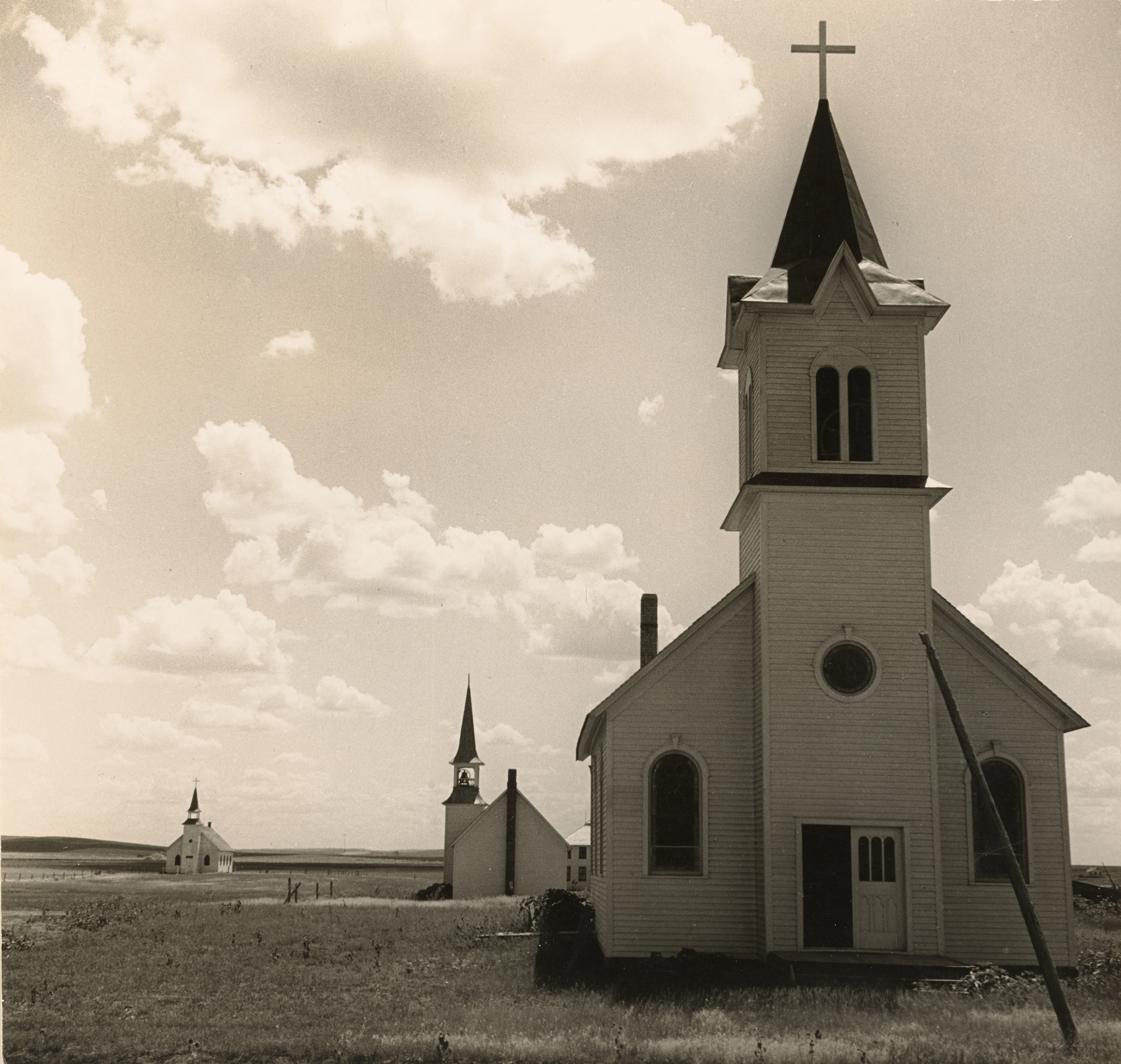
Three churches of the High Plains, near Winner, South Dakota, 1938

The majority of South Dakotans who claim a religious affiliation are Christians. As of 2010, Mainline Protestantism was the most popular religious tradition in South Dakota, with 196,001 adherents. Catholicism was second with 148,883 adherents, and Evangelical Protestantism was third with 118,142 adherents. 337,348 residents remained unclaimed.

Also in 2010, the Catholic Church was the largest church in South Dakota, with 148,883 members. The Evangelical Lutheran Church in America had 112,649 followers. The United Methodist Church had 36,020 members.

According to a 2001 survey, 86% of South Dakotans described themselves as being members of a Christian denomination, while 8% said that they were not religious and 3% claimed faith in a non-Christian religion. The largest Christian denomination was Lutheran (27%), followed closely by Roman Catholic at 25%. Other Christian denominations mentioned included Methodist (13%), Baptist (4%), Presbyterian (4%), Pentecostal (2%), Congregational (2%), Episcopal/Anglican (1%), and Seventh-day Adventist (1%). 7% responded either as a non-denominational Christian or a Protestant, while 2% refused to answer.
