= Prairiewood Village, South Dakota =

- Census-designated place
- Location within South Dakota Location within the United States
- Coordinates: 45°30′33″N 98°25′20″W
- Country: United States
- State: South Dakota
- County: Brown

Area
  - Total: 0.59 sq mi (1.53 km^{2})
  - Land: 0.59 sq mi (1.53 km^{2})
  - Water: 0 sq mi (0.00 km^{2})
- Elevation: 1,298 ft (396 m)

Population (2020)
  - Total: 303
  - Density: 513.8/sq mi (198.39/km^{2})
- Time zone: UTC-6 (Central (CST))
  - Summer (DST): UTC-5 (CDT)
- ZIP Code: 57401 (Aberdeen)
- Area code: 605
- FIPS code: 46-51724
- GNIS feature ID: 2807097

Prairiewood Village is an unincorporated community and census-designated place (CDP) in Brown County, South Dakota, United States. It was first listed as a CDP prior to the 2020 census. The CDP had a population of 303 at the 2020 census.

It is in the central part of the county, 6 miles (10 km) northeast of Aberdeen, the county seat. Moccasin Creek flows southward through the CDP, part of the James River watershed. Moccasin Creek Country Club is in the southeast part of the CDP.

== Demographics ==
Historical population
Census	Pop.	Note	%±
2020	303		—
U.S. Decennial Census
