= Ordway, South Dakota =

Unincorporated community in South Dakota, U.S.

Coordinates: 45°34′43″N 98°24′43″W

Ordway is an unincorporated community in Brown County, in the U.S. state of South Dakota.

== History ==
Ordway was platted in 1880. The community was named for Nehemiah G. Ordway, seventh Governor of Dakota Territory, from June 1, 1880, until June 24, 1884. A post office was established in Ordway in 1881, and remained in operation until it was discontinued in 1944.
