= Mansfield, South Dakota =

- Census-designated place
- Location within the state of South Dakota Mansfield (the United States)
- Coordinates: 45°14′47″N 98°33′29″W
- Country: United States
- State: South Dakota
- Counties: Brown, Spink

Area
  - Total: 2.41 sq mi (6.24 km^{2})
  - Land: 2.41 sq mi (6.24 km^{2})
  - Water: 0 sq mi (0.00 km^{2})
- Elevation: 1,286 ft (392 m)

Population (2020)
  - Total: 86
  - Density: 35.7/sq mi (13.77/km^{2})
- Time zone: UTC-6 (Central (CST))
  - Summer (DST): UTC-5 (CDT)
- ZIP code: 57460
- Area code: 605
- FIPS code: 46-40580
- GNIS feature ID: 2628848

Mansfield is an unincorporated community and census-designated place on the border between Brown and Spink counties, South Dakota, United States. The population was 86 according to the 2020 census.

Located 2 miles (3 km) west of Highway 281, it is approximately 18 miles (29 km) south of Aberdeen, the third largest city in South Dakota. The James River flows 7 miles (11 km) east of Mansfield, and the surrounding James River Valley is some of the richest farmland in the state. Additionally, this area is widely known for its large variety of game and is a popular pheasant hunting venue.

== Demographics ==
Historical population
Census	Pop.	Note	%±
2020	86		—
U.S. Decennial Census

== History ==
Mansfield was named for John Mansfield, who owned the land where the community is located. John Mansfield was also credited with bringing the railroad to the site.
