= Westport, South Dakota =

- Town
- Location in Brown County and the state of South Dakota
- Coordinates: 45°38′52″N 98°29′53″W
- Country: United States
- State: South Dakota
- County: Brown

Area
  - Total: 0.24 sq mi (0.61 km^{2})
  - Land: 0.24 sq mi (0.61 km^{2})
  - Water: 0 sq mi (0.00 km^{2})
- Elevation: 1,332 ft (406 m)

Population (2020)
  - Total: 88
  - Density: 374.5/sq mi (144.59/km^{2})
- Time zone: UTC-6 (Central (CST))
  - Summer (DST): UTC-5 (CDT)
- ZIP code: 57481
- Area code: 605
- FIPS code: 46-70540
- GNIS feature ID: 1267643

Westport is a town in western Brown County, South Dakota, United States. The population was 88 at the 2020 census.

The town has the name of a railroad employee.

== Geography ==
According to the United States Census Bureau, the town has a total area of 0.24 square miles (0.62 km^{2}), all land.

== Demographics ==
Historical population
Census	Pop.	Note	%±
1980	122		—
1990	112		−8.2%
2000	125		11.6%
2010	133		6.4%
2020	88		−33.8%
U.S. Decennial Census; 2017 Estimate

=== 2010 census ===
As of the census of 2010, there were 133 people, 48 households, and 34 families living in the town. The population density was 554.2 inhabitants per square mile (214.0/km^{2}). There were 51 housing units at an average density of 212.5 per square mile (82.0/km^{2}). The racial makeup of the town was 92.5% White, 4.5% Native American, and 3.0% from other races. Hispanic or Latino of any race were 3.0% of the population.

There were 48 households, of which 37.5% had children under the age of 18 living with them, 62.5% were married couples living together, 4.2% had a female householder with no husband present, 4.2% had a male householder with no wife present, and 29.2% were non-families. 25.0% of all households were made up of individuals, and 12.5% had someone living alone who was 65 years of age or older. The average household size was 2.77 and the average family size was 3.38.

The median age in the town was 40.5 years. 29.3% of residents were under the age of 18; 7.6% were between the ages of 18 and 24; 20.4% were from 25 to 44; 35.4% were from 45 to 64; and 7.5% were 65 years of age or older. The gender makeup of the town was 57.9% male and 42.1% female.

=== 2000 census ===
At the 2000 census, there were 125 people, 48 households and 37 families living in the town. The population density was 479.7 inhabitants per square mile (185.2/km^{2}). There were 52 housing units at an average density of 199.6 per square mile (77.1/km^{2}). The racial makeup of the town was 100.00% White.

There were 48 households, of which 39.6% had children under the age of 18 living with them, 64.6% were married couples living together, 10.4% had a female householder with no husband present, and 22.9% were non-families. 22.9% of all households were made up of individuals, and 12.5% had someone living alone who was 65 years of age or older. The average household size was 2.60 and the average family size was 3.05.

The age distribution was 29.6% under the age of 18, 4.8% from 18 to 24, 34.4% from 25 to 44, 20.0% from 45 to 64, and 11.2% who were 65 years of age or older. The median age was 36 years. For every 100 females, there were 98.4 males. For every 100 females age 18 and over, there were 83.3 males.

The median household income was $37,292, and the median family income was $40,625. Males had a median income of $25,313 versus $23,750 for females. The per capita income for the town was $15,541. There were no families and 2.2% of the population living below the poverty line, including no under eighteens and 5.0% of those over 64.

== See also ==
- List of towns in South Dakota
