= Huffton, South Dakota =

Unincorporated community in South Dakota, U.S.

Coordinates: 45°36′59″N 98°05′35″W

Huffton is an unincorporated community in Brown County, in the U.S. state of South Dakota.

== History ==
Huffton was originally called Foxton, and under the latter name was laid out circa 1880. A post office called Huffton was established in 1882, and remained in operation until 1962. The present name honors D. J. Huff, a first settler.
