= Warner, South Dakota =

- City
- Location in Brown County and the state of South Dakota
- Coordinates: 45°19′31″N 98°29′47″W
- Country: United States
- State: South Dakota
- County: Brown
- Founded: 1880; 146 years ago

Area
  - Total: 0.28 sq mi (0.72 km^{2})
  - Land: 0.28 sq mi (0.72 km^{2})
  - Water: 0 sq mi (0.00 km^{2})
- Elevation: 1,299 ft (396 m)

Population (2020)
  - Total: 485
  - Density: 1,736.0/sq mi (670.29/km^{2})
- Time zone: UTC-6 (Central (CST))
  - Summer (DST): UTC-5 (CDT)
- ZIP code: 57479
- Area code: 605
- FIPS code: 46-68740
- GNIS feature ID: 1267625

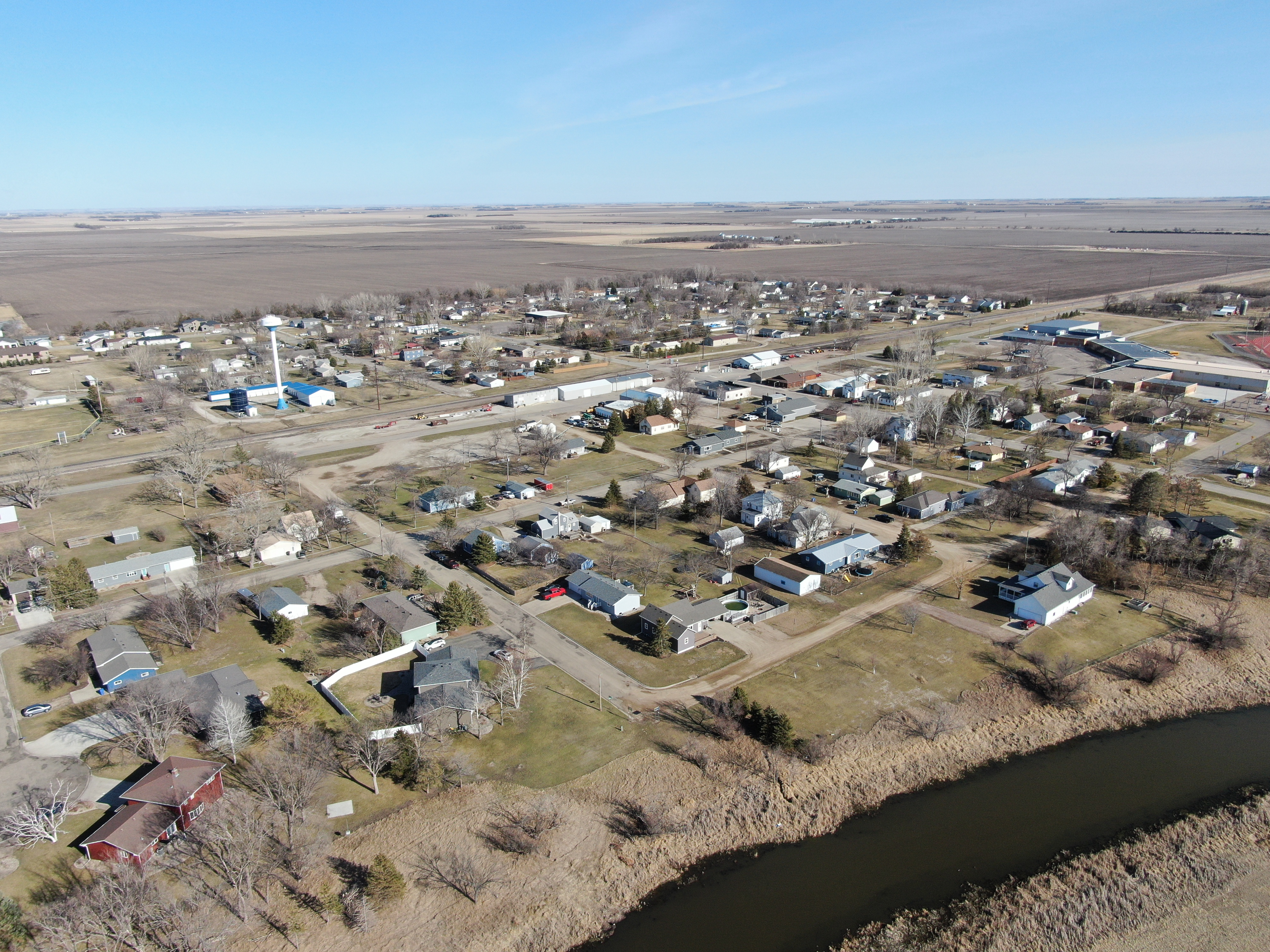
Warner in April 2022. Looking South East.

Warner is a city in Brown County, South Dakota, United States. The population was 485 at the 2020 census.

== History ==
Warner was established in June 1880. The town's name is derived from Warren Tarbox, a pioneer settler. Growth in Warner was primarily fueled by the expansion of the Chicago, Milwaukee, St. Paul and Pacific Railroad in 1881, and Great Northern Railway and the Minneapolis and St. Louis Railway a few years later. This is due to the next town north, Aberdeen, being where Great Northern Railway & Minneapolis and St. Louis Railway met, giving Aberdeen the nickname "hub city".

== Geography ==
According to the United States Census Bureau, the town has a total area of 0.28 square miles (0.73 km^{2}). Moccasin Creek flows through the West border of town. Unfortunately the town does not have public restrooms. Whether that is due to the review having been done on a holy day is yet to be determined. The town sits just above the flood plane for the creek.

== Demographics ==
Historical population
Census	Pop.	Note	%±
1980	322		—
1990	336		4.3%
2000	419		24.7%
2010	457		9.1%
2020	485		6.1%
U.S. Decennial Census

=== 2010 census ===
As of the census of 2010, there were 457 people, 166 households, and 130 families residing in the town. The population density was 1,632.1 inhabitants per square mile (630.2/km^{2}). There were 171 housing units at an average density of 610.7 per square mile (235.8/km^{2}). The racial makeup of the town was 95.8% White, 0.4% African American, 1.5% Native American, 0.7% Asian, and 1.5% from two or more races. Hispanic or Latino of any race were 0.9% of the population.

There were 166 households, of which 46.4% had children under the age of 18 living with them, 67.5% were married couples living together, 6.0% had a female householder with no husband present, 4.8% had a male householder with no wife present, and 21.7% were non-families. 18.1% of all households were made up of individuals, and 5.4% had someone living alone who was 65 years of age or older. The average household size was 2.75 and the average family size was 3.12.

The median age in the town was 33.9 years. 30.2% of residents were under the age of 18; 6.4% were between the ages of 18 and 24; 27.9% were from 25 to 44; 28% were from 45 to 64; and 7.4% were 65 years of age or older. The gender makeup of the town was 51.0% male and 49.0% female.

=== 2000 census ===
As of the census of 2000, there were 419 people, 144 households, and 115 families residing in the town. The population density was 1,387.4 inhabitants per square mile (535.7/km^{2}). There were 153 housing units at an average density of 506.6 per square mile (195.6/km^{2}). The racial makeup of the town was 97.61% White, 1.19% Native American, and 1.19% from two or more races. Hispanic or Latino of any race were 0.48% of the population.

There were 144 households, out of which 49.3% had children under the age of 18 living with them, 66.0% were married couples living together, 6.9% had a female householder with no husband present, and 20.1% were non-families. 19.4% of all households were made up of individuals, and 5.6% had someone living alone who was 65 years of age or older. The average household size was 2.91 and the average family size was 3.25.

In the town, the population was spread out, with 35.3% under the age of 18, 5.7% from 18 to 24, 30.5% from 25 to 44, 20.8% from 45 to 64, and 7.6% who were 65 years of age or older. The median age was 32 years. For every 100 females, there were 103.4 males. For every 100 females age 18 and over, there were 100.7 males.

The median income for a household in the town was $46,667, and the median income for a family was $52,000. Males had a median income of $30,156 versus $18,625 for females. The per capita income for the town was $15,417. About 4.7% of families and 5.6% of the population were below the poverty line, including 5.6% of those under age 18 and 13.0% of those age 65 or over.

== Education ==
=== Public Education ===
Warner High School comprises and is the sole school of the Warner School District. Warner High School houses and teaches students from kindergarten to high school, all from one building. Class size is normally around 20 students. The Warner High School is known for their athletics with a consistently high ranked volleyball team. Warner High School is also ranked 9th Best High School in South Dakota by US News.

== Notable people ==
- Boyd R. Overhulse, Oregon lawyer and state legislator, was born in Warner.
- Derrek Tuszka, former NFL outside linebacker and former national champion at North Dakota State.
- Chuck Welke, South Dakota educator and politician.
