= Aberdeen Township, Brown County, South Dakota =

Township in Brown County, South Dakota, United States

Coordinates: 45.45970°N 98.50590°W

Aberdeen Township is a township in Brown County, South Dakota, United States. As of the 2020 census, its population was 935.

Historical population
Census	Pop.	Note	%±
2000	1,403		—
2010	934		−33.4%
2020	935		0.1%
