= Putney, South Dakota =

Unincorporated community in South Dakota, U.S.

Coordinates: 45°33′37″N 98°10′31″W

Putney is an unincorporated community in Brown County, in the U.S. state of South Dakota.

== History ==
A post office called Putney was established in 1887, and remained in operation until 1963. The community took its name from Putney, Vermont, the native home of a first settler.
