= Ferney, South Dakota =

- Census-designated place
- Location within the state of South Dakota Ferney (the United States)
- Coordinates: 45°20′04″N 98°05′38″W
- Country: United States
- State: South Dakota
- County: Brown

Area
  - Total: 1.00 sq mi (2.60 km^{2})
  - Land: 1.00 sq mi (2.60 km^{2})
  - Water: 0 sq mi (0.00 km^{2})
- Elevation: 1,299 ft (396 m)

Population (2020)
  - Total: 42
  - Density: 41.9/sq mi (16.16/km^{2})
- Time zone: UTC-6 (Central (CST))
  - Summer (DST): UTC-5 (CDT)
- ZIP codes: 57439
- Area code: 605
- FIPS code: 46-21380
- GNIS feature ID: 1255039

Ferney is an unincorporated community and census-designated place in Brown County, South Dakota, United States. As of the 2020 census it had a population of 42.

== History ==
Ferney was laid out and platted in 1886 by W. H. Ferney, and named for him. According to another tradition, the name is a transfer from Ferney, France. A post office was established at Ferney in 1887, and remained in operation until it was discontinued in 1984.

== Demographics ==
Historical population
Census	Pop.	Note	%±
2020	42		—
U.S. Decennial Census
