= Sand Lake Wetland Management District =

Wildlife management area in South Dakota

- IUCN category IV (habitat/species management area)
- Location within South Dakota Location within the United States
- Location: South Dakota, USA
- Nearest city: Columbia, SD
- Coordinates: 45°34′12″N 98°22′16″W
- Area: 45,000 acres (18,000 ha)
- Established: 1961
- Governing body: U.S. Fish and Wildlife Service
- Website: Sand Lake Wetland Management District

Sand Lake Wetland Management District is located in the U.S. state of South Dakota and is administered by the U.S. Fish and Wildlife Service. This is the largest Wetland Management District in the U.S., with 45,000 acres (182 km^{2}) of area directly under federal protection and another 550,000 acres (2,225 km^{2}) managed in partnership with private landowners as conservation easements. A total of 162 Waterfowl Production areas are located on the federally owned lands and the conservation easements are generally adjacent to these areas and act as buffer zones to increase habitat protection.

== See also ==
- List of National Wildlife Refuges
