= Stratford, South Dakota =

- Town
- Location in Brown County and the state of South Dakota
- Coordinates: 45°19′03″N 98°18′16″W
- Country: United States
- State: South Dakota
- County: Brown
- Incorporated: 1919

Area
  - Total: 0.25 sq mi (0.65 km^{2})
  - Land: 0.25 sq mi (0.65 km^{2})
  - Water: 0 sq mi (0.00 km^{2})
- Elevation: 1,299 ft (396 m)

Population (2020)
  - Total: 57
  - Density: 228.4/sq mi (88.19/km^{2})
- Time zone: UTC-6 (Central (CST))
  - Summer (DST): UTC-5 (CDT)
- ZIP code: 57474
- Area code: 605
- FIPS code: 46-62020
- GNIS feature ID: 1267595

Stratford is a town in southern Brown County, South Dakota, United States. The population was 57 at the 2020 census.

Stratford had its start when the railroad was extended to that point.

== Geography ==
According to the United States Census Bureau, the town has a total area of 0.25 square miles (0.65 km^{2}), all land.

== Demographics ==
Historical population
Census	Pop.	Note	%±
1920	297		—
1930	262		−11.8%
1940	205		−21.8%
1950	164		−20.0%
1960	109		−33.5%
1970	106		−2.8%
1980	82		−22.6%
1990	85		3.7%
2000	96		12.9%
2010	72		−25.0%
2020	57		−20.8%
U.S. Decennial Census; 2017 Estimate

=== 2010 census ===
As of the census of 2010, there were 72 people, 30 households, and 20 families living in the town. The population density was 288.0 inhabitants per square mile (111.2/km^{2}). There were 41 housing units at an average density of 164.0 per square mile (63.3/km^{2}). The racial makeup of the town was 95.8% White and 4.2% Native American.

There were 30 households, of which 33.3% had children under the age of 18 living with them, 53.3% were married couples living together, 6.7% had a female householder with no husband present, 6.7% had a male householder with no wife present, and 33.3% were non-families. 30.0% of all households were made up of individuals, and 10% had someone living alone who was 65 years of age or older. The average household size was 2.40 and the average family size was 3.05.

The median age in the town was 38.5 years. 26.4% of residents were under the age of 18; 8.2% were between the ages of 18 and 24; 31.9% were from 25 to 44; 22.2% were from 45 to 64; and 11.1% were 65 years of age or older. The gender makeup of the town was 52.8% male and 47.2% female.

=== 2000 census ===
As of the census of 2000, there were 96 people, 36 households, and 21 families living in the town. The population density was 388.7 inhabitants per square mile (150.1/km^{2}). There were 42 housing units at an average density of 170.0 per square mile (65.6/km^{2}). The racial makeup of the town was 100.00% White. Hispanic or Latino of any race were 2.08% of the population.

There were 36 households out of which 36.1% had children under the age of 18 living with them, 47.2% were married couples living together, 5.6% had a female householder with no husband present, and 38.9% were non-families. 33.3% of all households were made up of individuals, and 5.6% had someone living alone who was 65 years of age or older. The average household size was 2.67 and the average family size was 3.55.

In the town, the population was spread out, with 36.5% under the age of 18, 5.2% from 18 to 24, 32.3% from 25 to 44, 18.8% from 45 to 64, and 7.3% who were 65 years of age or older. The median age was 32 years. For every 100 females, there were 134.1 males. For every 100 females age 18 and over, there were 117.9 males.

The median income for a household in the town was $22,500, and the median income for a family was $26,875. Males had a median income of $22,500 versus $24,375 for females. The per capita income for the town was $10,090. There were 17.4% of families and 18.3% of the population living below the poverty line, including 22.5% of under eighteens and 100.0% of those over 64.

== See also ==
- List of towns in South Dakota
