= Bath, South Dakota =

- Census-designated place
- Location within South Dakota Location within the United States
- Coordinates: 45°28′09″N 98°19′25″W
- Country: United States
- State: South Dakota
- County: Brown

Area
  - Total: 0.29 sq mi (0.75 km^{2})
  - Land: 0.29 sq mi (0.75 km^{2})
  - Water: 0 sq mi (0.00 km^{2})
- Elevation: 1,303 ft (397 m)

Population (2020)
  - Total: 142
  - Density: 487.9/sq mi (188.37/km^{2})
- Time zone: UTC-6 (Central (CST))
  - Summer (DST): UTC-5 (CDT)
- ZIP code: 57427
- Area code: 605
- FIPS code: 46-03900
- GNIS feature ID: 2584544

Bath is an unincorporated community and census-designated place in Brown County, South Dakota, United States. As of the 2020 census, Bath had a population of 142.

== History ==
A post office called Bath was established in 1881. The community's name is derived from Bath, England.

== Demographics ==
Historical population
Census	Pop.	Note	%±
2020	142		—
U.S. Decennial Census
