= Columbia, South Dakota =

- City
- Location in Brown County and the state of South Dakota
- Coordinates: 45°36′53″N 98°18′38″W
- Country: United States
- State: South Dakota
- County: Brown
- Incorporated: 1885

Area
  - Total: 1.52 sq mi (3.93 km^{2})
  - Land: 1.52 sq mi (3.93 km^{2})
  - Water: 0 sq mi (0.00 km^{2})
- Elevation: 1,299 ft (396 m)

Population (2020)
  - Total: 160
  - Density: 105.5/sq mi (40.73/km^{2})
- Time zone: UTC-6 (Central (CST))
  - Summer (DST): UTC-5 (CDT)
- ZIP code: 57433
- Area code: 605
- FIPS code: 46-13420
- GNIS feature ID: 1267335
- Website: columbia-sd.com

Columbia is a city on the James River in Brown County, South Dakota, United States. The population was 160 at the 2020 census.

== History ==
An early variant name was Allentown. The city derives its present name from the song "Hail, Columbia".

== Geography ==
According to the United States Census Bureau, the city has a total area of 1.52 square miles (3.94 km^{2}), all land.

=== Climate ===
Climate data for Columbia 8 N, South Dakota (1991−2020 normals, extremes 1949−present)
Month	Jan	Feb	Mar	Apr	May	Jun	Jul	Aug	Sep	Oct	Nov	Dec	Year
Record high °F (°C)	60 (16)	68 (20)	83 (28)	95 (35)	101 (38)	106 (41)	108 (42)	108 (42)	99 (37)	97 (36)	79 (26)	65 (18)	108 (42)
Mean daily maximum °F (°C)	21.5 (−5.8)	26.4 (−3.1)	39.3 (4.1)	55.2 (12.9)	68.2 (20.1)	77.8 (25.4)	83.1 (28.4)	81.4 (27.4)	72.9 (22.7)	57.5 (14.2)	40.7 (4.8)	26.9 (−2.8)	54.2 (12.3)
Daily mean °F (°C)	10.9 (−11.7)	15.4 (−9.2)	28.5 (−1.9)	43.1 (6.2)	56.5 (13.6)	66.7 (19.3)	71.5 (21.9)	69.2 (20.7)	59.9 (15.5)	45.3 (7.4)	30.0 (−1.1)	17.1 (−8.3)	42.8 (6.0)
Mean daily minimum °F (°C)	0.4 (−17.6)	4.5 (−15.3)	17.7 (−7.9)	31.1 (−0.5)	44.8 (7.1)	55.7 (13.2)	59.9 (15.5)	56.9 (13.8)	46.9 (8.3)	33.0 (0.6)	19.3 (−7.1)	7.3 (−13.7)	31.5 (−0.3)
Record low °F (°C)	−39 (−39)	−45 (−43)	−28 (−33)	−9 (−23)	18 (−8)	33 (1)	38 (3)	34 (1)	15 (−9)	−1 (−18)	−26 (−32)	−38 (−39)	−45 (−43)
Average precipitation inches (mm)	0.47 (12)	0.44 (11)	0.87 (22)	1.77 (45)	3.41 (87)	3.59 (91)	3.62 (92)	2.62 (67)	2.38 (60)	2.11 (54)	0.68 (17)	0.50 (13)	22.46 (570)
Average snowfall inches (cm)	7.7 (20)	6.8 (17)	6.1 (15)	3.6 (9.1)	0.0 (0.0)	0.0 (0.0)	0.0 (0.0)	0.0 (0.0)	0.0 (0.0)	0.7 (1.8)	5.7 (14)	7.2 (18)	37.8 (96)
Average precipitation days (≥ 0.01 in)	5.9	4.9	5.5	6.6	10.0	10.9	9.6	7.5	7.1	6.6	4.6	5.4	84.6
Average snowy days (≥ 0.1 in)	7.3	5.4	4.2	1.9	0.0	0.0	0.0	0.0	0.0	0.7	3.3	6.6	29.4
Source: NOAA

== Demographics ==
Historical population
Census	Pop.	Note	%±
1880	133		—
1890	400		200.8%
1900	143		−64.2%
1910	235		64.3%
1920	327		39.1%
1930	251		−23.2%
1940	275		9.6%
1950	270		−1.8%
1960	272		0.7%
1970	240		−11.8%
1980	161		−32.9%
1990	133		−17.4%
2000	140		5.3%
2010	136		−2.9%
2020	160		17.6%
U.S. Decennial Census; 2017 Estimate

=== 2020 census ===
As of the 2020 census, Columbia had a population of 160. The median age was 37.7 years. 26.2% of residents were under the age of 18, and 17.5% of residents were 65 years of age or older. For every 100 females there were 113.3 males, and for every 100 females age 18 and over there were 110.7 males age 18 and over.

0.0% of residents lived in urban areas, while 100.0% lived in rural areas.

There were 69 households in Columbia, of which 24.6% had children under the age of 18 living in them. Of all households, 43.5% were married-couple households, 26.1% were households with a male householder and no spouse or partner present, and 21.7% were households with a female householder and no spouse or partner present. About 40.5% of all households were made up of individuals and 23.2% had someone living alone who was 65 years of age or older.

There were 74 housing units, of which 6.8% were vacant. The homeowner vacancy rate was 0.0% and the rental vacancy rate was 0.0%.

Racial composition as of the 2020 census
Race	Number	Percent
White	157	98.1%
Black or African American	0	0.0%
American Indian and Alaska Native	2	1.2%
Asian	0	0.0%
Native Hawaiian and Other Pacific Islander	0	0.0%
Some other race	0	0.0%
Two or more races	1	0.6%
Hispanic or Latino (of any race)	1	0.6%

=== 2010 census ===
As of the census of 2010, there were 136 people, 70 households, and 39 families residing in the city. The population density was 89.5 inhabitants per square mile (34.6/km^{2}). There were 80 housing units at an average density of 52.6 per square mile (20.3/km^{2}). The racial makeup of the city was 98.5% White, 0.7% from other races, and 0.7% from two or more races. Hispanic or Latino of any race were 2.2% of the population.

There were 70 households, of which 17.1% had children under the age of 18 living with them, 47.1% were married couples living together, 8.6% had a female householder with no husband present, and 44.3% were non-families. 40.0% of all households were made up of individuals, and 18.6% had someone living alone who was 65 years of age or older. The average household size was 1.94 and the average family size was 2.59.

The median age in the city was 51 years. 15.4% of residents were under the age of 18; 4.4% were between the ages of 18 and 24; 22% were from 25 to 44; 33.9% were from 45 to 64; and 24.3% were 65 years of age or older. The gender makeup of the city was 51.5% male and 48.5% female.

=== 2000 census ===
As of the census of 2000, there were 140 people, 65 households, and 39 families residing in the city. The population density was 88.8 inhabitants per square mile (34.3/km^{2}). There were 76 housing units at an average density of 48.2 per square mile (18.6/km^{2}). The racial makeup of the city was 98.57% White and 1.43% Native American.

There were 65 households, out of which 26.2% had children under the age of 18 living with them, 50.8% were married couples living together, 7.7% had a female householder with no husband present, and 38.5% were non-families. 36.9% of all households were made up of individuals, and 16.9% had someone living alone who was 65 years of age or older. The average household size was 2.15 and the average family size was 2.80.

In the city, the population was spread out, with 22.1% under the age of 18, 7.9% from 18 to 24, 27.1% from 25 to 44, 25.0% from 45 to 64, and 17.9% who were 65 years of age or older. The median age was 41 years. For every 100 females, there were 91.8 males. For every 100 females age 18 and over, there were 91.2 males.

The median income for a household in the city was $23,125, and the median income for a family was $27,813. Males had a median income of $30,000 versus $21,000 for females. The per capita income for the city was $17,967. There were 10.6% of families and 13.1% of the population living below the poverty line, including 13.8% of under eighteens and 5.9% of those over 64.

== Notable people ==
- James H. Fletcher, 1st Lieutenant Governor of South Dakota
- Kermit Wahl, Major League Baseball player

== See also ==
- List of cities in South Dakota
