= Brown County, South Dakota =

County in South Dakota, United States

- County
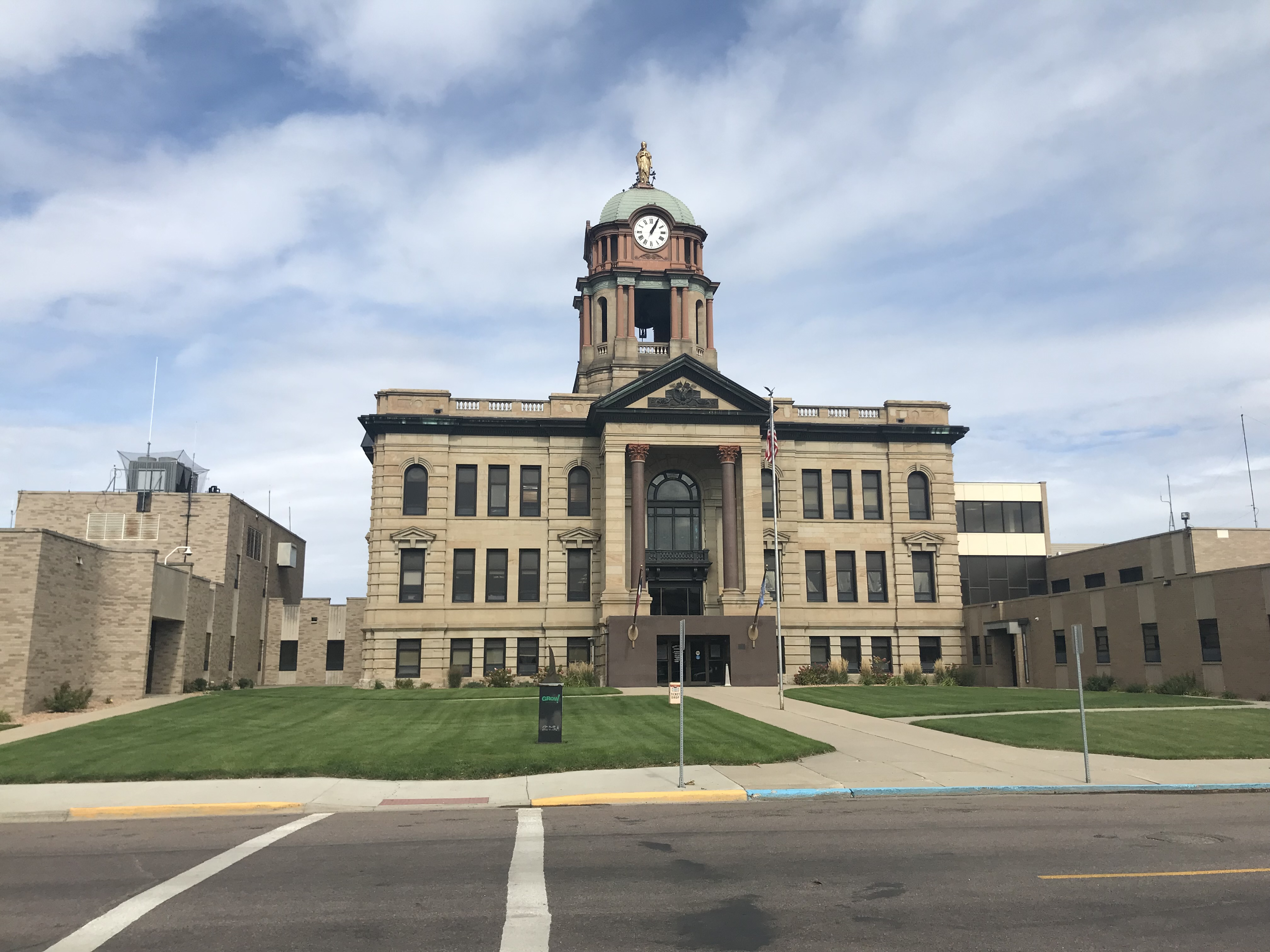
- Brown County Courthouse in fall

- Flag

- Location within the U.S. state of South Dakota
- Coordinates: 45°35′21.314″N 98°21′7.83″W
- Country: United States
- State: South Dakota
- Founded: July 6, 1881
- Named for: Alfred Brown
- Seat: Aberdeen
- Largest city: Aberdeen

Area
  - Total: 1,730.951 sq mi (4,483.14 km^{2})
  - Land: 1,713.030 sq mi (4,436.73 km^{2})
  - Water: 17.921 sq mi (46.42 km^{2}) 1.0%

Population (2020)
  - Total: 38,301
  - Estimate (2025): 37,561 ▼
  - Density: 22/sq mi (8.5/km^{2})
- Time zone: UTC−6 (Central)
  - Summer (DST): UTC−5 (CDT)
- Congressional district: At-large
- Website: brown.sd.us

Brown County is a county in the U.S. state of South Dakota. As of the 2020 census, the population was 38,301, making it the fourth most populous county in South Dakota, and was estimated to be 37,561 in 2025. Its county seat is Aberdeen. The county is named for Alfred Brown, of Hutchinson County, South Dakota, a Dakota Territory legislator in 1879.

Brown County is part of the Aberdeen, SD Micropolitan Statistical Area.

== Geography ==
Brown County lies on the north side of South Dakota. Its north boundary line abuts the south boundary line of the state of North Dakota. The James River flows south-southwest through the county; its entry point into neighboring Spink County marks Brown County's lowest elevation: 1,266 ft (386 m) ASL. The terrain of Brown County consists of rolling terrain, sloping to the south and east, largely devoted to agriculture.

According to the United States Census Bureau, the county has a total area of 1,730.951 square miles (4,483.14 km^{2}), of which 1,713.030 square miles (4,436.73 km^{2}) is land and 17.921 square miles (46.42 km^{2}) (1.0%) is water. It is the 13th largest county in South Dakota by total area.

=== Major highways ===
- U.S. Highway 12
- U.S. Highway 281
- South Dakota Highway 10
- South Dakota Highway 37

=== Adjacent counties ===
- Dickey County, North Dakota – north
- Sargent County, North Dakota – northeast
- Marshall County – east
- Day County – southeast
- Spink County – south
- Faulk County – southwest
- Edmunds County – southwest
- McPherson County – northwest

=== Protected areas ===
- Bodi State Game Production Area (part)
- Casanova State Game Production Area
- Columbia State Game Production Area
- Cutler State Game Production Area
- Diagonal Trees State Game Production Area
- Elm Creek State Game Production Area (part)
- Erickson State Game Production Area
- Hansen Preserve State Game Production Area
- Hart Quarter State Game Production Area
- Hecla State Game Production Area
- Jilek-Dahme State Game Production Area
- Pigors Lake State Game Production Area
- Putney Slough State Game Production Area
- Putney State Game Production Area
- Renziehausen Slough State Game Bird Refuge
- Renziehausen State Game Production Area (part)
- Richmond Dam State Game Production Area
- Richmond Lake State Recreation Area
- Richmond State Lakeside Use Area
- Sand Lake National Wildlife Refuge
- Zabrasha State Game Production Area

== Demographics ==
Historical population
Census	Pop.	Note	%±
1880	353		—
1890	16,855		4,674.8%
1900	15,286		−9.3%
1910	25,867		69.2%
1920	29,509		14.1%
1930	31,458		6.6%
1940	29,676		−5.7%
1950	32,617		9.9%
1960	34,106		4.6%
1970	36,920		8.3%
1980	36,962		0.1%
1990	35,580		−3.7%
2000	35,460		−0.3%
2010	36,531		3.0%
2020	38,301		4.8%
2025 (est.)	37,561	▼	−1.9%
U.S. Decennial Census:

As of the third quarter of 2024, the median home value in Brown County was $221,040.

As of the 2023 American Community Survey, there are 16,364 estimated households in Brown County with an average of 2.26 persons per household. The county has a median household income of $70,239. Approximately 10.0% of the county's population lives at or below the poverty line. Brown County has an estimated 70.0% employment rate, with 33.2% of the population holding a bachelor's degree or higher and 93.7% holding a high school diploma.

The top five reported ancestries (people were allowed to report up to two ancestries, thus the figures will generally add to more than 100%) were English (93.8%), Spanish (2.7%), Indo-European (1.0%), Asian and Pacific Islander (2.1%), and Other (0.5%).

The median age in the county was 37.8 years.

Brown County, South Dakota – racial and ethnic composition
Note: the US Census treats Hispanic/Latino as an ethnic category. This table excludes Latinos from the racial categories and assigns them to a separate category. Hispanics/Latinos may be of any race.

Race / ethnicity (NH = non-Hispanic)	Pop. 1980	Pop. 1990	Pop. 2000	Pop. 2010	Pop. 2020
White alone (NH)	35,852 (97.00%)	34,307 (96.42%)	33,715 (95.08%)	33,825 (92.59%)	32,705 (85.39%)
Black or African American alone (NH)	23 (0.06%)	44 (0.12%)	97 (0.27%)	187 (0.51%)	535 (1.40%)
Native American or Alaska Native alone (NH)	826 (2.23%)	976 (2.74%)	954 (2.69%)	1,078 (2.95%)	1,103 (2.88%)
Asian alone (NH)	117 (0.32%)	139 (0.39%)	142 (0.40%)	353 (0.97%)	918 (2.40%)
Pacific Islander alone (NH)	—	—	26 (0.07%)	42 (0.11%)	44 (0.11%)
Other race alone (NH)	23 (0.06%)	3 (0.01%)	8 (0.02%)	17 (0.05%)	96 (0.25%)
Mixed race or multiracial (NH)	—	—	281 (0.79%)	533 (1.46%)	1,241 (3.24%)
Hispanic or Latino (any race)	121 (0.33%)	111 (0.31%)	237 (0.67%)	496 (1.36%)	1,659 (4.33%)
Total	36,962 (100.00%)	35,580 (100.00%)	35,460 (100.00%)	36,531 (100.00%)	38,301 (100.00%)

=== 2020 census ===
As of the 2020 census, there were 38,301 people, 16,130 households, and 9,595 families residing in the county, of which 28.0% had children under the age of 18 living with them and 25.9% had a female householder with no spouse or partner present. About 33.9% of all households were made up of individuals and 13.7% had someone living alone who was 65 years of age or older. The population density was 22.4 inhabitants per square mile (8.6/km^{2}). There were 17,885 housing units at an average density of 10.4 per square mile (4.0/km^{2}), of which 9.8% were vacant. Among occupied housing units, 64.5% were owner-occupied and 35.5% were renter-occupied. The homeowner vacancy rate was 1.9% and the rental vacancy rate was 11.0%. Of the residents, 23.7% were under the age of 18 and 18.1% were 65 years of age or older; the median age was 38.2 years. For every 100 females there were 98.8 males, and for every 100 females age 18 and over there were 97.3 males. The racial makeup of the county was 86.4% White, 1.5% Black or African American, 3.1% American Indian and Alaska Native, 2.4% Asian, 1.8% from some other race, and 4.6% from two or more races. Hispanic or Latino residents of any race comprised 4.3% of the population.

=== 2010 census ===
As of the 2010 census, there were 36,531 people, 15,489 households, and 9,374 families in the county. The population density was 21.3 inhabitants per square mile (8.2/km^{2}). There were 16,706 housing units at an average density of 9.8 per square mile (3.8/km^{2}). The racial makeup of the county was 93.23% White, 0.53% African American, 3.02% Native American, 0.97% Asian, 0.11% Pacific Islander, 0.41% from some other races and 1.72% from two or more races. Hispanic or Latino people of any race were 1.36% of the population.

Of the 15,489 households, 28.4% had children under the age of 18 living with them, 48.5% were married couples living together, 8.1% had a female householder with no husband present, 39.5% were non-families, and 33.0% of all households were made up of individuals. The average household size was 2.27 and the average family size was 2.89. The median age was 38.6 years.

The median income for a household in the county was $45,615 and the median income for a family was $58,683. Males had a median income of $37,997 versus $28,419 for females. The per capita income for the county was $23,878. About 5.6% of families and 10.2% of the population were below the poverty line, including 9.6% of those under age 18 and 15.4% of those age 65 or over.

== Politics ==
Brown County was long a Democratic stronghold, home to notable Democrats including South Dakota Governor Ralph Herseth, US Senate majority leader Tom Daschle and Congresswoman Stephanie Herseth Sandlin. It generally voted Democratic except in Republican landslides (though often relatively narrowly margins) in presidential elections from 1932 until 1996. Since then, Brown County has trended Republican, particularly at the local level, although the county was carried by Barack Obama in 2008.

United States presidential election results for Brown County, South Dakota
Year	Republican		Democratic		Third party(ies)	
Year	No.	%	No.	%	No.	%
1892	1,446	45.33%	279	8.75%	1,465	45.92%
1896	1,618	46.15%	1,867	53.25%	21	0.60%
1900	2,197	54.42%	1,722	42.66%	118	2.92%
1904	2,737	66.32%	988	23.94%	402	9.74%
1908	2,646	55.93%	1,772	37.46%	313	6.62%
1912	0	0.00%	2,488	50.69%	2,420	49.31%
1916	2,659	45.19%	2,676	45.48%	549	9.33%
1920	5,581	56.54%	1,364	13.82%	2,926	29.64%
1924	2,740	60.67%	361	7.99%	1,415	31.33%
1928	7,266	58.03%	5,065	40.45%	191	1.53%
1932	4,639	34.11%	8,669	63.74%	293	2.15%
1936	4,505	32.19%	9,177	65.58%	311	2.22%
1940	6,598	45.05%	8,048	54.95%	0	0.00%
1944	5,611	46.90%	6,352	53.10%	0	0.00%
1948	5,632	43.42%	7,148	55.10%	192	1.48%
1952	9,581	60.94%	6,140	39.06%	0	0.00%
1956	8,193	53.28%	7,184	46.72%	0	0.00%
1960	8,037	50.45%	7,893	49.55%	0	0.00%
1964	5,524	37.76%	9,107	62.24%	0	0.00%
1968	6,685	45.95%	7,302	50.20%	560	3.85%
1972	8,134	49.44%	8,216	49.94%	101	0.61%
1976	7,609	45.75%	8,888	53.44%	136	0.82%
1980	10,550	58.61%	6,050	33.61%	1,399	7.77%
1984	10,541	60.35%	6,852	39.23%	72	0.41%
1988	8,537	49.34%	8,673	50.13%	92	0.53%
1992	6,665	36.93%	7,521	41.67%	3,861	21.39%
1996	6,801	41.35%	7,913	48.11%	1,733	10.54%
2000	9,060	54.72%	7,173	43.33%	323	1.95%
2004	10,386	55.84%	7,943	42.71%	270	1.45%
2008	8,067	46.29%	9,041	51.88%	318	1.82%
2012	8,321	51.79%	7,250	45.12%	497	3.09%
2016	9,613	59.66%	5,452	33.83%	1,049	6.51%
2020	10,580	60.30%	6,538	37.26%	429	2.44%
2024	10,645	62.46%	6,075	35.65%	323	1.90%

== Communities ==
=== Cities ===
- Aberdeen (county seat)
- Columbia
- Groton

=== Towns ===
- Claremont
- Frederick
- Hecla
- Stratford
- Verdon
- Warner
- Westport

=== Census-designated places ===
- Bath
- Bath Corner
- Ferney
- Hutterville Colony
- Mansfield (partial)
- Prairiewood Village

=== Unincorporated communities ===
- Barnard
- Houghton
- Huffton
- James
- Nahon
- Ordway
- Putney
- Richmond
- Richmond Heights
- Rudolph
- Tacoma Park
- Winship

=== Townships ===
- Aberdeen
- Allison
- Bates
- Bath
- Barnard
- Cambria
- Carlisle
- Claremont
- Columbia
- East Hanson
- East Rondell
- Franklyn
- Frederick
- Garden Prairie
- Garland
- Gem
- Greenfield
- Groton
- Hecla
- Henry
- Highland
- Lansing
- Liberty
- Lincoln
- Mercier
- New Hope
- North Detroit
- Oneota
- Ordway
- Osceola
- Palmyra
- Portage
- Prairiewood
- Putney
- Ravinia
- Richland
- Riverside
- Savo
- Shelby
- South Detroit
- Warner
- West Hanson
- West
- Westport

== See also ==
- National Register of Historic Places listings in Brown County, South Dakota
- List of counties in South Dakota
