= List of museums in South Dakota =

This list of museums in South Dakota encompasses museums defined for this context as institutions (including nonprofit organizations, government entities, and private businesses) that collect and care for objects of cultural, artistic, scientific, or historical interest and make their collections or related exhibits available for public viewing. Museums that exist only in cyberspace (i.e., virtual museums) are not included.

== Museums ==
| Name | Town/City | County | Region | Type | Summary |
|---|---|---|---|---|---|
| 1881 Courthouse Museum | Custer | Custer | Western | Local history | Operated by the Custer Country Historical Society |
| Adams Homestead and Nature Preserve | McCook Lake | Union | Southeast | Open air | website, park with historic Shay-Adams Home with period furnishings, barn, country school and church |
| Adams Museum & House | Deadwood | Lawrence | Western | Local history | Exhibits include folk art, Wild Bill Hickok, Calamity Jane and Deadwood Dick |
| Akta Lakota Museum | Chamberlain | Brule | Central | Native American | website, profiles the lives of nomadic Plains Indians |
| Armed Forces Military Display and Gifts | Wasta | Pennington | Western | Military | Private museum displaying foreign and domestic militaria from World War I, World War II, Korea, Vietnam and current US conflicts |
| Augustana College Art Galleries | Sioux Falls | Minnehaha | Southeast | Art | Center for Visual Arts houses the Eide/Dalrymple Gallery and Carl Grupp Permanent Collection, the Hovland Center for Liturgical Arts, dedicated space for displaying student work; Center for Western Studies Art Gallery displays history and cultures of the Northern Plains and rotating exhibits of regional artists |
| Aurora County Museum | Plankinton | Aurora | Southeast | Local history | |
| Austin-Whittemore House | Vermillion | Clay | Southeast | Local history | Operated by the Clay County Historical Society, late 19th-century house with Victorian furnishings and items of local historical interest |
| Badlands National Park | Interior | Jackson | Western | Natural history | Visitor center exhibits include the geology, paleontology and natural history of the park |
| Badlands Petrified Garden | Kadoka | Jackson | Western | Natural history | website, rocks, minerals and fossils |
| Beauvais Heritage Museum | Clark | Clark | Northeast | Open air | website, complex includes museum with period displays, Clark Railroad Depot, a settler's shanty, a pioneer church and school; also known as Clark County Museum |
| Big Thunder Gold Mine | Keystone | Pennington | Western | Mining | website, includes mine tour and museum |
| Black Hills Mining Museum | Lead | Lawrence | Western | Mining | website, simulated gold mine tours |
| Black Hills Museum of Natural History | Hill City | Pennington | Western | Natural history | Fossils, dinosaurs, gems, minerals, meteorites |
| Bon Homme Heritage Museum | Tyndall | Bon Homme | Southeast | Local history | |
| Borglum Historical Center | Keystone | Pennington | Western | Biographical | website, Mount Rushmore sculptor Gutzon Borglum |
| Brookings County Museum | Volga | Brookings | Northeast | Local history | Includes an 1870 log cabin, vintage farm equipment, antique tools, and a one-room country school house |
| Buechel Memorial Lakota Museum | St. Francis | Todd | Central | Native American | website, history of the Lakota of the Rosebud Indian Reservation, operated by the St. Francis Mission |
| Buffalo Historical Museum | Buffalo | Harding | Western | Local history | Includes museum and 1914 one room schoolhouse |
| Buffalo Interpretive Center | Fort Pierre | Stanley | Central | Natural history | website, story of the buffalo, its importance and significance in the North American Indian cultures of the Great Plains, and its relationship to the people of the Lower Brule Sioux Tribe |
| Campbell Original Straw Bale Built Museum | Carthage | Miner | Southeast | Local history | website, located in a building built out of straw bales |
| Carnegie Resource Center | Mitchell | Davison | Southeast | Local history | website, operated by the Mitchell Area Historical Society, exhibits of local history and genealogy, permanent collection of Corn Palace memorabilia |
| Casey Tibbs South Dakota Rodeo Center | Fort Pierre | Stanley | Central | Sports | website, South Dakota rodeo heritage and memorabilia |
| Cecil & Phyllis Melcher Museum | Platte | Charles Mix | Southeast | Local history | Located in the Lyric Theatre, includes dolls, wildlife of South Dakota, toy tractors and tractors, arts of local areas, cars and a military room |
| Celebrity Hotel Memorabilia Display | Deadwood | Lawrence | Western | Multiple | website, located in the Celebrity Hotel, celebrity memorabilia, cars and motorcycles |
| Center for Western Studies | Sioux Falls | Minnehaha | Southeast | American West | website, part of Augustana College, exhibits include Native American artifacts, 19th century replica Norwegian living room, Jim Savage art studio, changing exhibits from its collections |
| Chapel in the Hills | Rapid City | Pennington | Western | Historic site | Stave church replica of the Borgund stave church in Norway and 19th century Norwegian log cabin |
| Children's Museum of South Dakota | Brookings | Brookings | Northeast | Children's | website |
| Civilian Conservation Corps Museum of South Dakota | Hill City | Pennington | Western | History | website |
| Classic Wheels Museum | Clark | Clark | Northeast | Transportation | website, includes antique vehicles, toy cars, model trains |
| Codington County Heritage Museum | Watertown | Codington | Northeast | Local history | History and heritage of Codington County and the Coteau des Prairie region of northeastern South Dakota |
| Corn Palace | Mitchell | Davison | Southeast | Agriculture | History of the Corn Palace's design, construction, link to area agriculture |
| Corsica Historical Museum | Corsica | Douglas | Southeast | Local history | website |
| Cramer Kenyon Heritage Home | Yankton | Yankton | Southeast | Historic house | website, 1880s Victorian mansion |
| Crazy Horse Memorial | Crazy Horse | Custer | Western | Multiple | Monumental sculpture of Crazy Horse, Indian Museum of North America, and the Native American Cultural Center |
| Custer State Park | Custer | Custer | Western | Multiple | Includes Peter Norbeck Center with natural history and cultural heritage displays, and Badger Hole, the historic house of poet Badger Clark |
| Dacotah Prairie Museum | Aberdeen | Brown | Northeast | Multiple | website, natural, cultural and local history |
| Dahl Arts Center | Rapid City | Pennington | Western | Art | website |
| Dakota Discovery Museum | Mitchell | Davison | Southeast | Multiple | website, art, history, culture, located on the campus of Dakota Wesleyan University |
| Dakota Sunset Museum | Gettysburg | Potter | Central | Local history | website, includes museum, country school, carriage barn, and blacksmith shop |
| Dakota Territorial Museum | Yankton | Yankton | Southeast | Local history | website, includes museum, school, depot and caboose. Now located inside the Mead Cultural Education Center in Yankton. |
| Dakotaland Museum | Huron | Beadle | Northeast | Local history | Located on the State Fairgrounds |
| Daneville Heritage Museum | Viborg | Turner | Southeast | Local history | |
| Day County Museum | Webster | Day | Northeast | Local history | Located in basement of Day County Courthouse |
| Days of '76 Museum | Deadwood | Lawrence | Western | American West | website, includes horse-drawn vehicles, rodeo items, Old West pioneer and American Indian art and artifacts |
| D.C. Booth Historic National Fish Hatchery | Spearfish | Lawrence | Western | Industry | Former hatchery, includes Von Bayer Museum of Fish Culture with exhibits about the history and science of fish culture and fisheries |
| De Smet Depot Museum | De Smet | Kingsbury | Southeast | Local history | |
| Clear Lake Museum | Clear Lake | Deuel | Northeast | Local history | Operated by the Clear Lake Historical Society, open for special events and by appointment |
| Cheryl's Doll House | Lennox | Lincoln | Southeast | Toy | |
| Donald Christman Toy Museum | Lake Norden | Hamlin | Southeast | Toy | Includes antique dishes and farm toys, antique dolls |
| Douglas County Museum | Armour | Douglas | Southeast | Local history | Includes the Country School and Railroad House, operated by the Douglas County Historical Society |
| Elkton Community Museum | Elkton | Brookings | Northeast | Local history | Open by appointment |
| Eureka Pioneer Museum | Eureka | McPherson | Northeast | Local history | |
| Faulk County Historical Museum | Faulkton | Faulk | Central | Local history | Open by appointment |
| Fort Meade Museum | Sturgis | Meade | Western | Military | website, history of Fort Meade, located in the former commanding officers' quarters |
| Fort Sisseton Historical Park | Lake City | Marshall | Northeast | Military | State park with preserved 1864 fort buildings |
| Four Mile Old West Town | Custer | Custer | Western | Open air | website, buildings include a town hall, saloon, general store, church, bank, an outhouse, sheriff's office, jails |
| Frederick Area Historical Society | Frederick | Brown | Northeast | Local history | |
| Garretson Area Historical Society Museum | Garretson | Minnehaha | Southeast | Local history | |
| Geddes Historic Village | Geddes | Charles Mix | Southeast | Open air | Operated by the Charles Mix County Historical Restoration Society, open by appointment |
| Granary Rural Cultural Center | Groton | Brown | Southeast | Art | website |
| Grand River Museum | Lemmon | Perkins | Western | Multiple | website, includes local bronze sculptures, ranching, Native American and homestead artifacts, fossils and Creation Science displays |
| Grant County Historical Society Museum | Milbank | Grant | Northeast | Local history | |
| Gary Historical Museum | Gary | Deuel | Northeast | Historical Museum | Operated by the Gary Historical Association Open for special occasions and by appointment. http://www.experiencegarysd.com / |
| Gregory County History Museum | Dallas | Gregory | Southeast | Local history | Operated by the Gregory County Historical Society |
| Harry's Antique Safe Museum | Mitchell | Davison | Southeast | Commodity | Antique safes, farm toys and toy race cars |
| Heritage Hall Museum | Freeman | Hutchinson | Southeast | Multiple | website, displays natural history, history and local history, including pioneer tools, pioneer household items, antiques, toys, vehicles and native wildlife displays |
| Heritage Center of Red Cloud Indian School | Pine Ridge Indian Reservation | Shannon | Western | Native American | website, Lakota culture and Native art, located on the campus of the Red Cloud Indian School |
| Hermosa Arts and History Museum | Hermosa | Custer | Western | Local history | |
| High Plains Western Heritage Center | Spearfish | Lawrence | Western | American West | website, Western art, historic artifacts & memorabilia |
| Historic Adams House | Deadwood | Lawrence | Western | Historic house | 1892 mansion |
| Historic Chicago & Northwestern Railroad Depot | Redfield | Spink | Northeast | Railroad | website, railroad items, model trains, engines and artifacts |
| Historic Prairie Village | Madison | Lake | Southeast | Open air | website, includes over 40 antique-filled buildings, agricultural displays, steam tractors, a sawmill and a train |
| Hollands Grist Mill | Milbank | Grant | Northeast | Mill | Also known as Milbank Grist Mill, reconstructed grist mill |
| Ingalls Homestead | De Smet | Kingsbury | Southeast | Open air | website, includes Charles Ingalls homestead, school, dugout house, prairie learning center, pioneer activities |
| International Vinegar Museum | Roslyn | Day | Northeast | Food | Vinegars from all over the world |
| Jerauld County Pioneer Museum | Wessington Springs | Jerauld | Southeast | Multiple | Complex includes one room school, medical office, Western equipment, blacksmith shop, local history artifacts, operated by the Dunham Historical Society |
| J.W. Parmley Historical Home | Ipswich | Edmunds | Northeast | Historic house | Includes the J.W. Parmley House and the Parmley Land Office |
| Journey Museum and Gardens | Rapid City | Pennington | Western | Multiple | Contains prehistoric & historic collections related to the Western Great Plains with displays of local geology, archaeology, Native American culture, & European pioneer history in the Minnilusa Pioneer Museum |
| Keystone Historical Museum | Keystone | Pennington | Western | Local history | website |
| Klein Museum | Mobridge | Walworth | Northeast | Local history | website, features pioneer and Native American artifacts |
| Lake County Museum | Madison | Lake | Southeast | Local history | website, part of Dakota State University, operated by the Lake County Historical Society |
| Lake Norden Historical Society | Lake Norden | Hamlin | Southeast | Local history | Includes museum, one room school and barn with artifacts |
| Lake Poinsett Visitor Center and Museum | Arlington | Brookings | Northeast | Local history | website, area natural and cultural history, Native American artifacts, located in Lake Poinsett Recreation Area |
| Laura Ingalls Wilder Memorial Society | De Smet | Kingsbury | Southeast | Historic house | website, operates guided tours of two original homes of the family of author Laura Ingalls Wilder, including the Ingalls House |
| Lennox Museum | Lennox | Lincoln | Southeast | Local history | |
| Lewis and Clark Center Visitor Center | Yankton | Yankton | Southeast | Multiple | website, exhibits include natural & cultural history, geology, exploration, Native Americans, steamboats |
| Little Village Farm Museum | Dell Rapids | Minnehaha | Southeast | Agriculture | Several barns and buildings with agriculture tools and equipment |
| Loriks-Peterson Heritage House | Oldham | Kingsbury | Southeast | Historic house | |
| Lyman County Museum | Presho | Lyman | Southeast | Local history | |
| Major James McLaughlin Heritage Center | McLaughlin | Corson | Western | Local history | Local history, agriculture, Native Americans, Mahto Post Office, country school display |
| The Mammoth Site | Hot Springs | Fall River | Western | Natural history | Active paleontological dig site and museum with fossils of mammoths, ancient flora and fauna |
| McWhorter House Museum and Depot | Miller | Hand | Northeast | Local history | |
| Mead Cultural Education Center | Yankton | Yankton | Southeast | Local History | The new location of the Dakota Territory Museum. Features permanent and traveling exhibits. |
| Mellette House | Watertown | Codington | Northeast | Historic house | website, Victorian home of South Dakota's first governor, Arthur Calvin Mellette |
| Midland Pioneer Museum | Midland | Haakon | Central | Local history | Pioneer and railroad history and artifacts, open by appointment |
| Miner County Rural Life Museum | Howard | Miner | Southeast | Local history | Rural life displays, operated by the Miner County Historical Society |
| Minuteman Missile National Historic Site | Jackson County | Jackson | Western | Military | Includes visitor center, launch control center and a missile silo/launch facility |
| Mitchell Prehistoric Indian Village | Mitchell | Davison | Southeast | Archaeology | Prehistoric Indian village archeological site and museum of artifacts |
| Moody County Museum and Research Center | Flandreau | Moody | Southeast | Local history | Operated by the Moody County Historical Society |
| Mount Rushmore | Keystone | Pennington | Western | Art | National Memorial and sculpture of four U.S. Presidents carved into a mountain, includes Lincoln Borglum Museum with films and exhibits about sculptor Gutzon Borglum, the creation of Mount Rushmore and its workers, also the studio where Borglum worked |
| Museum of Geology | Rapid City | Pennington | Western | Natural history | Part of the South Dakota School of Mines and Technology, area fossils and minerals from around the world |
| Museum of Visual Materials | Sioux Falls | Minnehaha | Southeast | Art | website, art exhibits in many media, art and crafts classes, children's art and play activities |
| Museum of Wildlife, Science and Industry of NE South Dakota | Webster | Day | Northeast | Multiple | website, features many buildings with exhibits of military, agricultural and pioneer life, antique tractors, cars, and mounted wildlife, restored historic buildings |
| National Museum of Woodcarving | Custer | Custer | Western | Art | website, art and sculptures carved in wood |
| National Music Museum | Vermillion | Clay | Southeast | Music | American, European, and non-Western instruments from all cultures and historical periods |
| National Presidential Wax Museum | Keystone | Pennington | Western | Wax | website, wax figures of U.S. presidents in historic moments |
| Newell Museum | Newell | Butte | Western | Local history | Displays include a one-room school, log cabin, church, and barn, agriculture, family life, education, religion, Native Americans, the Fur Trade, military and toys |
| Nicollet Tower | Sisseton | Roberts | Northeast | History | website, 75 ft climbing tower with interpretive center that features a great map by Joseph Nicollet, a documentary film and local art |
| Oglala Lakota College Historical Center | Kyle | Shannon | Western | Native American | website, history of the Lakota people |
| Old Courthouse Museum | Sioux Falls | Minnehaha | Southeast | Local history | |
| Petrified Wood Park | Lemmon | Perkins | Western | Multiple | Includes sculptures and structures built from petrified wood and fossils and the Lemmon Pioneer Museum |
| Pettigrew Home & Museum | Sioux Falls | Minnehaha | Southeast | Historic house | website, late 19th-century house and personal collections of Senator Richard F. Pettigrew |
| Pickler Mansion | Faulkton | Faulk | Central | Historic house | Operated by the Faulk County Historical Society, late 19th-century mansion, home of South Dakota's first Congressman |
| Pioneer Auto Show | Murdo | Jones | Western | Multiple | website, automobiles, trucks, motorcycles, National Rockhound Hall of Fame & Lapidary, tractors, antiques and collectibles, authentic prairie town that includes a railroad depot, bank, general store, gas station, church, school, camera shop, butcher shop and more |
| Pioneer Historical Museum of South Dakota | Hot Springs | Fall River | Western | History | website, antiques, decorative arts, tools, photos, operated by the Fall River County Historical Society |
| Pollock Visitor and Interpretive Center | Pollock | Campbell | Central | Local history | |
| Porter Sculpture Park | Montrose | McCook | Southeast | Art | Outdoor sculpture park |
| Prairie Homestead | Philip | Haakon | Central | Historic house | Early 20th century sod dwelling typical of area pioneers |
| Prayer Rock Museum | Britton | Marshall | Northeast | Local history | |
| Pyle House | Huron | Beadle | Northeast | Historic house | 1894 home of Gladys Pyle, the first elected woman U.S. senator |
| Redlin Art Center | Watertown | Codington | Northeast | Art | Gallery that displays over 150 works by artist Terry Redlin |
| Scouter's Attic Museum | Sioux Falls | Minnehaha | Southeast | Scouting | website, scout memorabilia including uniforms, equipment and promotional items |
| Sioux Empire Medical Museum | Sioux Falls | Minnehaha | Southeast | Medical | Located in the concourse below the Sanford USD Medical Center Lobby |
| South Dakota Air and Space Museum | Box Elder | Meade | Western | Aerospace | US Air Force and South Dakota aviation history |
| South Dakota Amateur Baseball Hall of Fame | Lake Norden | Hamlin | Southeast | Hall of fame - Sports | Amateur baseball in South Dakota as well as memorabilia from South Dakotans who played Major League Baseball |
| South Dakota Art Museum | Brookings | Brookings | Northeast | Art | website, collections include works by Harvey Dunn and Paul Goble, Native American cultural artifacts, Marghab linens, part of South Dakota State University |
| South Dakota Cultural Heritage Center | Pierre | Hughes | Central | History | Operated by the South Dakota Historical Society, state history and culture |
| South Dakota Discovery Center | Pierre | Hughes | Central | Science | Hands-on Science Center website |
| South Dakota Hall of Fame | Chamberlain | Brule | Central | Hall of fame - History | Honors those who contributed to the progress, way of life, and values of the South Dakota |
| South Dakota National Guard Museum | Pierre | Hughes | Central | Military | website, history and memorabilia of the South Dakota National Guard |
| South Dakota's Original 1880 Town | Murdo | Jones | Western | Open air | website, includes over 30 building with historic artifacts and rodeo star Casey Tibbs Museum |
| South Dakota Agricultural Heritage Museum | Brookings | Brookings | Northeast | Agriculture | website, part of South Dakota State University, exhibits include tractors and farm equipment, an original 1882 homestead claim shack, and a recreated 1915 farmhouse. Abundant historic photographs enhance the understanding of South Dakota's rural qualities. |
| South Dakota School of Mines & Technology APEX Gallery | Rapid City | Pennington | Western | Art | Located in Classroom Building 211, hosts a new exhibit every four to six weeks |
| South Dakota State Capitol | Pierre | Hughes | Central | History | Tours include the capitol and First Lady Gown Collection |
| South Dakota State Railroad Museum | Hill City | Pennington | Western | Railroad | website, railroad memorabilia, model trains from across South Dakota and Mid-America |
| South Dakota Tractor Museum | Kimball | Brule | Central | Agriculture | website, historic tractors and other farm machinery |
| Spink County Museum | Redfield | Spink | Northeast | Local history | |
| Springfield College Museum | Springfield | Bon Homme | Southeast | Local history | Memorabilia from the college known as University of South Dakota–Springfield that was located in Springfield from 1896 to 1984 |
| Springfield Historical Society Museum | Springfield | Bon Homme | Southeast | Local history | |
| Stavig House | Sisseton | Roberts | Northeast | Historic house | website, early 20th-century Victorian period home of a Norwegian immigrant family |
| Sturgis Motorcycle Museum & Hall of Fame | Sturgis | Meade | Western | Transportation | Features vintage and rare V-twin and metric motorcycles |
| Telstar Mustang Shelby Cobra Restorations & Museum | Mitchell | Davison | Southeast | Automotive | website, privately owned, fully restored collection of Mustangs, Shelby & Cobra automobiles |
| Timber Lake and Area Museum | Timber Lake | Dewey | Central | Local history | website, includes fossils, Native American artifacts, period displays |
| Trails, Trains & Pioneers Museum | Edgemont | Fall River | Western | Local history | website, operate by the Edgemont Area Historical Society |
| Tri-State Museum | Belle Fourche | Butte | Western | American West | website, early pioneer, rodeo, and old west history of the Tri-State region of Western South Dakota, Eastern Wyoming and Southeast Montana |
| Tripp County Historical Society Museum | Winner | Tripp | Southeast | Local history | |
| Union County Museum | Elk Point | Union | Southeast | Local history | Operated by the Union County Historical Society |
| University of South Dakota Art Galleries | Vermillion | Clay | Southeast | Art | John A. Day Gallery, Gallery 110, Oscar Howe Gallery, University Libraries exhibits |
| Vancura Park | Tabor | Bon Homme | Southeast | Open air | Includes Czech Museum, chapel, jail, store, log school and log house in the Czech Pioneer Village, and the Blachnik Museum with handmade crafts |
| Verendrye Museum | Fort Pierre | Stanley | Central | Local history | |
| Wade's Gold Mill | Hill City | Pennington | Western | Mining | website, modern gold mill and antique mining museum |
| Washington Pavilion of Arts and Science | Sioux Falls | Minnehaha | Southeast | Multiple | Includes the Kirby Science Discover Center and Visual Arts Center with galleries |
| W. H. Over Museum | Vermillion | Clay | Southeast | Multiple | website, natural history displays, Native American and pioneer artifacts |
| Willow Lake Community Museum | Willow Lake | Clark | Northeast | Local history | website |
| Wind Cave National Park | Hot Springs | Fall River | Western | Natural history | Visitor center includes three rooms with exhibits about the geology of the caves, the park's natural and cultural history |
| Wounded Knee Museum | Wall | Pennington | Western | Native American | website, history of the Wounded Knee Massacre |

== Defunct museums ==
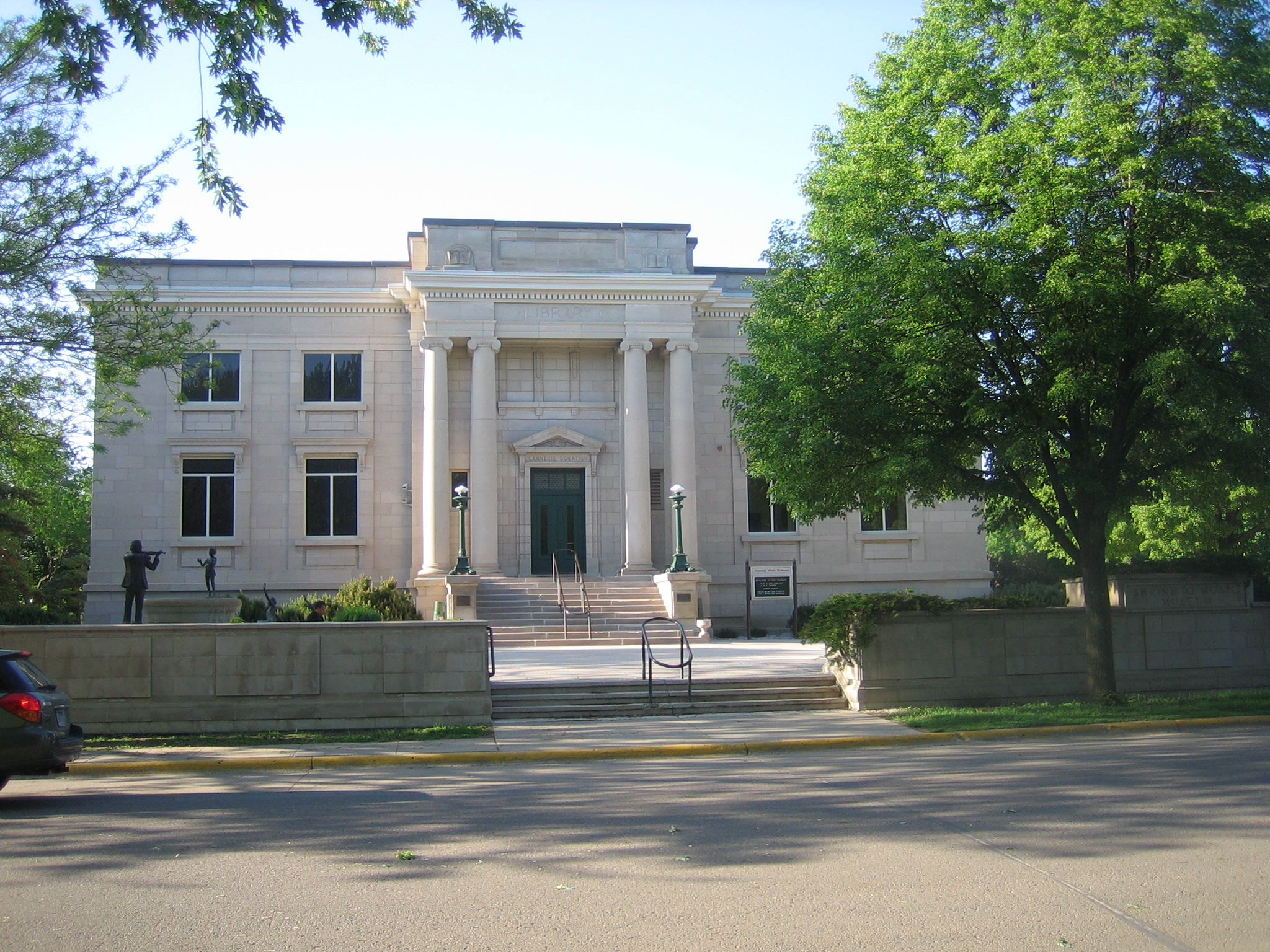
National Music Museum

- Delbridge Museum of Natural History, Sioux Falls
- McCook County Museum, Salem
- Performance Auto Museum, Sioux Falls and Deadwood
- Soukup and Thomas International Balloon and Airship Museum, Mitchell, closed in 2000

== See also ==
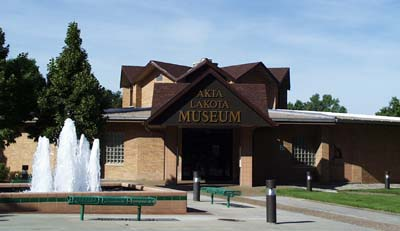
Akta Lakota Museum

- Nature Centers in South Dakota

== Resources ==
- Association of South Dakota Museums
