= National Register of Historic Places listings in Edmunds County, South Dakota =

Location of Edmunds County in South Dakota

This is a list of the National Register of Historic Places listings in Edmunds County, South Dakota.

This is intended to be a complete list of the properties on the National Register of Historic Places in Edmunds County, South Dakota, United States. The locations of National Register properties and districts for which the latitude and longitude coordinates are included below, may be seen in a map.

There are 12 properties listed on the National Register in the county. Another 2 properties were once listed but have been removed.

This National Park Service list is complete through NPS recent listings posted May 30, 2025.

== Current listings ==
	Name on the Register	Image	Date listed	Location	City or town	Description
1	Bank of Bowdle	Bank of Bowdle	January 31, 1985 (#85000183)	3026 Main Street; 45°27′19″N 99°39′13″W	Bowdle	
2	Marcus P. Beebe Library		November 16, 1977 (#77001243)	Main Street and Second Avenue; 45°26′15″N 99°01′31″W	Ipswich	
3	Marcus Beebe House		December 12, 1976 (#76001733)	4th Street and 5th Avenue; 45°26′56″N 99°01′45″W	Ipswich	
4	Bierman Barn		October 7, 1998 (#96001230)	14315 372nd Avenue; 45°16′16″N 98°45′19″W	Mansfield	
5	Edmunds County Courthouse		August 16, 2000 (#00000997)	Second Avenue between Second and Third Streets; 45°26′45″N 99°01′32″W	Ipswich	
6	Ipswich Baptist Church		January 30, 1978 (#78002550)	Main Street and Third Avenue; 45°26′41″N 99°01′32″W	Ipswich	
7	Ipswich Masonic Temple		June 30, 2020 (#100005320)	318 2nd Ave. 45°26′43″N 99°01′39″W	Ipswich	
8	Ipswich State Bank	Ipswich State Bank	May 22, 1978 (#78002551)	First Avenue and Main Street; 45°26′12″N 99°01′30″W	Ipswich	
9	William C. and Anna Krueger Barn		June 20, 2023 (#100009043)	0.25 miles (0.40 km) south of jct. of 371st Ave. and 125th St. 45°34′33″N 98°45′32″W	Wetonka vicinity	
10	Parmley Land Office		March 26, 1979 (#79002402)	119 Main Street; 45°26′42″N 99°01′40″W	Ipswich	
11	J.W. Parmley House		June 4, 1980 (#80003720)	4th Street and 4th Avenue; 45°26′38″N 99°01′48″W	Ipswich	
12	John Strouckel House		November 28, 1984 (#84001268)	Northeastern corner of the eastern half of Section 33, T122N, R72W, west of Loyalton; Address Restricted	Loyalton	

== Former listings ==
	Name on the Register	Image	Date listed	Date removed	Location	City or town	Description
1	John Eisenbeis House		August 13, 1984 (#84003283)	October 30, 2017	West of Highway 47 in the southern half of the southwestern quadrant of Section 17, T124N, R73W	Bowdle	
2	Roscoe Community Hall		August 1, 1984 (#84003284)	August 16, 2013	202 Mitchell Street; 45°27′00″N 99°20′15″W	Roscoe	Demolished

== See also ==
- List of National Historic Landmarks in South Dakota
- National Register of Historic Places listings in South Dakota
