= 1916 United States presidential election in South Dakota =

- November 7, 1916
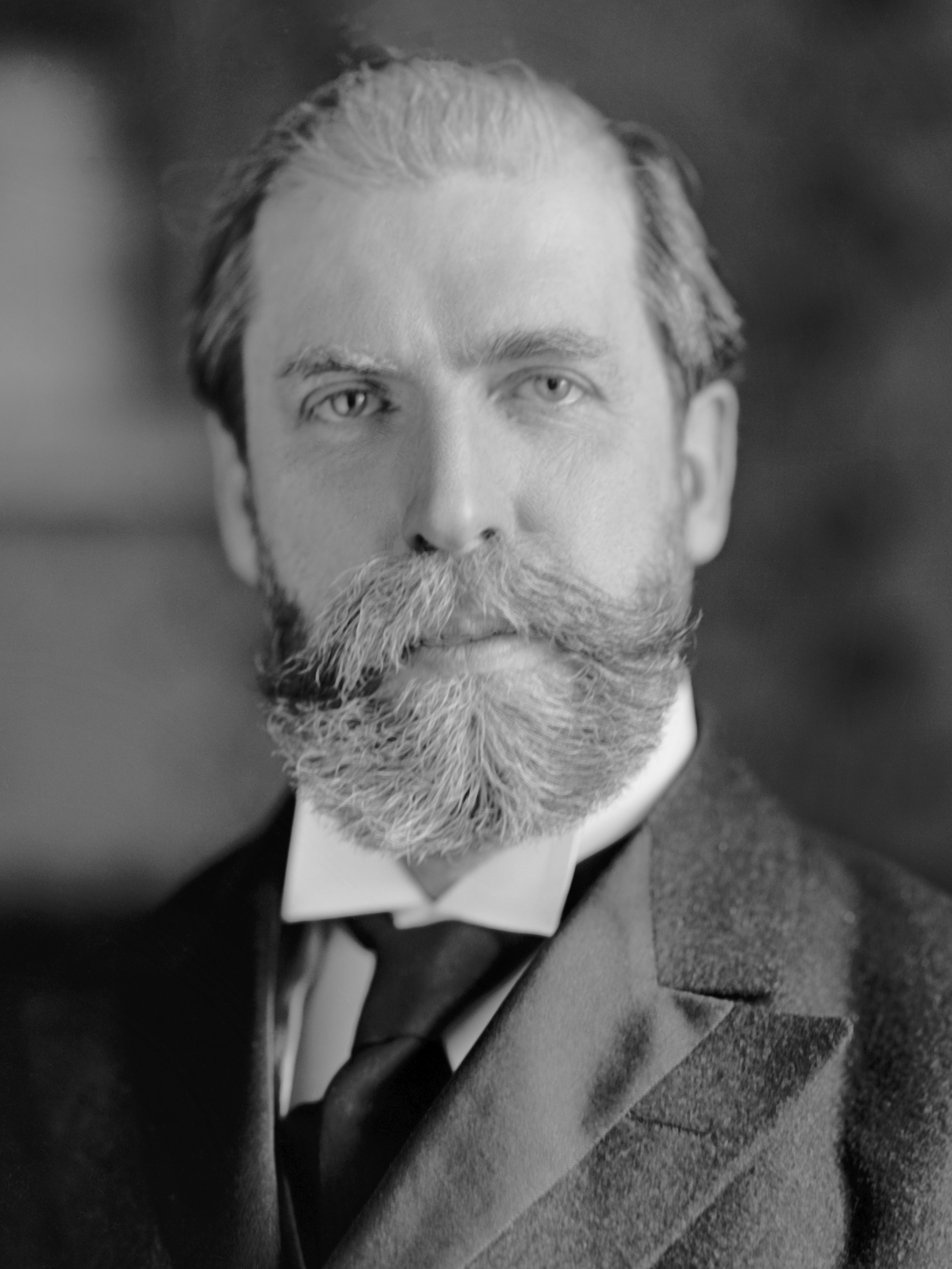

Nominee	Charles Evans Hughes	Woodrow Wilson
Party	Republican	Democratic
Home state	New York	New Jersey
Running mate	Charles W. Fairbanks	Thomas R. Marshall
Electoral vote	5	0
Popular vote	64,217	59,191
Percentage	49.80%	45.91%
County results
Hughes
40–50%
50–60%
60–70%
70–80%
80–90%
Wilson
40–50%
50–60%
60–70%
70–80%
President before election
Woodrow Wilson
Democratic
Elected President
Woodrow Wilson
Democratic

The 1916 United States presidential election in South Dakota took place on November 7, 1916, as part of the 1916 United States presidential election in which all contemporary forty-eight states participated. Voters chose five electors, or representatives to the Electoral College, who voted for president and vice president.

South Dakota voted for the Republican nominee, Supreme Court Justice Charles Evans Hughes of New York, over the Democratic nominee, incumbent President Woodrow Wilson of New Jersey. Hughes won South Dakota by a close margin of 3.90%; alongside Oregon, South Dakota was the only state that Hughes won in the Great Plains or westward.

Hughes’ victory was largely due to the powerful GOP loyalty of East River German-Americans, who feared that Wilson's pro-British and pro-French sentiments would lead the United States to involve itself in war with Germany. In contrast, the more Anglo-Saxon West River counties strongly supported Wilson's Southern roots and prohibitionist leanings. Despite his loss, Wilson's 45.91% was the best performance in the state by a Democrat since William Jennings Bryan won the state in a fusion with the Populist Party two decades before, and would be beaten only six times in the ensuing century.

As of the 2020 presidential election, this is the last election that Lawrence County voted for the Democratic presidential candidate, and the last election that South Dakota voted for a different presidential candidate than neighboring North Dakota.

== Results ==
Presidential Candidate	Running Mate	Party	Electoral Vote (EV)	Popular Vote (PV)	
Charles Evans Hughes	Charles W. Fairbanks	Republican	5	64,217	49.80%
Woodrow Wilson	Thomas R. Marshall	Democratic	0	59,191	45.91%
Allan L. Benson	George R. Kirkpatrick	Socialist	0	3,760	2.92%
James Hanly	Ira Landrith	Prohibition	0	1,774	1.38%

=== Results by county ===
County	Charles Evans Hughes Republican		Thomas Woodrow Wilson Democratic		Allan Louis Benson Socialist		James Franklin Hanly Prohibition		Margin		Total votes cast
County	#	%	#	%	#	%	#	%	#	%	Total votes cast
Aurora	735	46.05%	793	49.69%	23	1.44%	45	2.82%	-58	-3.63%	1,596
Beadle	1,662	45.72%	1,828	50.29%	121	3.33%	24	0.66%	-166	-4.57%	3,635
Bennett	67	22.56%	222	74.75%	4	1.35%	4	1.35%	-155	-52.19%	297
Bon Homme	1,231	47.92%	1,278	49.75%	40	1.56%	20	0.78%	-47	-1.83%	2,569
Brookings	1,638	51.79%	1,385	43.79%	46	1.45%	94	2.97%	253	8.00%	3,163
Brown	2,659	45.19%	2,676	45.48%	472	8.02%	77	1.31%	-17	-0.29%	5,884
Brule	729	41.66%	975	55.71%	40	2.29%	6	0.34%	-246	-14.06%	1,750
Buffalo	80	30.19%	182	68.68%	1	0.38%	2	0.75%	-102	-38.49%	265
Butte	537	33.31%	930	57.69%	135	8.37%	10	0.62%	-393	-24.38%	1,612
Campbell	644	77.40%	163	19.59%	14	1.68%	11	1.32%	481	57.81%	832
Charles Mix	1,450	41.26%	2,011	57.23%	41	1.17%	12	0.34%	-561	-15.96%	3,514
Clark	1,226	52.71%	1,016	43.68%	28	1.20%	56	2.41%	210	9.03%	2,326
Clay	1,000	44.52%	1,207	53.74%	25	1.11%	14	0.62%	-207	-9.22%	2,246
Codington	1,550	51.82%	1,344	44.93%	47	1.57%	50	1.67%	206	6.89%	2,991
Corson	503	42.20%	641	53.78%	41	3.44%	7	0.59%	-138	-11.58%	1,192
Custer	392	42.11%	488	52.42%	50	5.37%	1	0.11%	-96	-10.31%	931
Davison	1,516	50.48%	1,374	45.75%	67	2.23%	46	1.53%	142	4.73%	3,003
Day	1,758	61.21%	907	31.58%	121	4.21%	86	2.99%	851	29.63%	2,872
Deuel	908	59.35%	584	38.17%	14	0.92%	24	1.57%	324	21.18%	1,530
Dewey	352	47.00%	379	50.60%	14	1.87%	4	0.53%	-27	-3.60%	749
Douglas	815	57.48%	597	42.10%	3	0.21%	3	0.21%	218	15.37%	1,418
Edmunds	894	55.46%	634	39.33%	41	2.54%	43	2.67%	260	16.13%	1,612
Fall River	668	40.63%	922	56.08%	44	2.68%	10	0.61%	-254	-15.45%	1,644
Faulk	759	52.89%	629	43.83%	25	1.74%	22	1.53%	130	9.06%	1,435
Grant	1,098	55.31%	772	38.89%	48	2.42%	67	3.38%	326	16.42%	1,985
Gregory	1,434	51.86%	1,242	44.92%	72	2.60%	17	0.61%	192	6.94%	2,765
Haakon	399	41.05%	475	48.87%	86	8.85%	12	1.23%	-76	-7.82%	972
Hamlin	1,039	57.82%	692	38.51%	30	1.67%	36	2.00%	347	19.31%	1,797
Hand	801	44.95%	905	50.79%	49	2.75%	27	1.52%	-104	-5.84%	1,782
Hanson	767	51.10%	712	47.44%	9	0.60%	13	0.87%	55	3.66%	1,501
Harding	520	41.57%	597	47.72%	119	9.51%	15	1.20%	-77	-6.16%	1,251
Hughes	611	51.13%	536	44.85%	39	3.26%	9	0.75%	75	6.28%	1,195
Hutchinson	1,636	73.20%	519	23.22%	53	2.37%	27	1.21%	1,117	49.98%	2,235
Hyde	438	55.58%	305	38.71%	40	5.08%	5	0.63%	133	16.88%	788
Jackson	283	49.39%	279	48.69%	6	1.05%	5	0.87%	4	0.70%	573
Jerauld	612	48.42%	589	46.60%	5	0.40%	58	4.59%	23	1.82%	1,264
Kingsbury	1,339	51.80%	1,096	42.40%	70	2.71%	80	3.09%	243	9.40%	2,585
Lake	1,398	55.04%	1,027	40.43%	92	3.62%	23	0.91%	371	14.61%	2,540
Lawrence	2,074	47.51%	2,157	49.42%	114	2.61%	20	0.46%	-83	-1.90%	4,365
Lincoln	1,591	60.29%	936	35.47%	62	2.35%	50	1.89%	655	24.82%	2,639
Lyman	981	45.65%	1,052	48.95%	99	4.61%	17	0.79%	-71	-3.30%	2,149
Marshall	808	45.57%	885	49.92%	56	3.16%	24	1.35%	-77	-4.34%	1,773
McCook	1,194	52.19%	1,021	44.62%	49	2.14%	24	1.05%	173	7.56%	2,288
McPherson	992	80.06%	224	18.08%	16	1.29%	7	0.56%	768	61.99%	1,239
Meade	858	38.25%	1,224	54.57%	141	6.29%	20	0.89%	-366	-16.32%	2,243
Mellette	379	45.55%	436	52.40%	15	1.80%	2	0.24%	-57	-6.85%	832
Miner	1,006	52.21%	880	45.67%	24	1.25%	17	0.88%	126	6.54%	1,927
Minnehaha	4,318	52.64%	3,494	42.59%	197	2.40%	194	2.36%	824	10.05%	8,203
Moody	973	49.09%	898	45.31%	89	4.49%	22	1.11%	75	3.78%	1,982
Pennington	1,108	42.73%	1,339	51.64%	122	4.70%	24	0.93%	-231	-8.91%	2,593
Perkins	890	45.41%	939	47.91%	118	6.02%	13	0.66%	-49	-2.50%	1,960
Potter	512	54.58%	408	43.50%	7	0.75%	11	1.17%	104	11.09%	938
Roberts	1,259	47.17%	1,191	44.62%	187	7.01%	32	1.20%	68	2.55%	2,669
Sanborn	711	42.00%	898	53.04%	28	1.65%	56	3.31%	-187	-11.05%	1,693
Spink	1,660	48.61%	1,622	47.50%	74	2.17%	59	1.73%	38	1.11%	3,415
Stanley	254	38.25%	381	57.38%	19	2.86%	10	1.51%	-127	-19.13%	664
Sully	281	50.45%	268	48.11%	8	1.44%	0	0.00%	13	2.33%	557
Tripp	1,074	43.57%	1,341	54.40%	40	1.62%	10	0.41%	-267	-10.83%	2,465
Turner	1,573	56.93%	1,134	41.04%	18	0.65%	38	1.38%	439	15.89%	2,763
Union	1,108	44.95%	1,313	53.27%	19	0.77%	25	1.01%	-205	-8.32%	2,465
Walworth	761	55.03%	590	42.66%	28	2.02%	4	0.29%	171	12.36%	1,383
Yankton	1,429	48.66%	1,438	48.96%	45	1.53%	25	0.85%	-9	-0.31%	2,937
Ziebach	275	54.89%	211	42.12%	10	2.00%	5	1.00%	64	12.77%	501
Totals	64,217	49.80%	59,191	45.91%	3,760	2.92%	1,774	1.38%	5,026	3.90%	128,942

== See also ==
- United States presidential elections in South Dakota
