= Cornelius Donahue =

American cattle rustler, horse thief, and outlaw

Cornelius Donahue alias "Lame Johnny" (c.1850 in Philadelphia – July 1, 1879), was an American cattle rustler, horse thief and outlaw in the Black Hills of South Dakota. His gang's most notorious robbery was $3,500 in currency, $500 in diamonds, hundreds of dollars' worth of jewelry and 700 pounds of gold dust, nuggets and bullion from a special treasure coach called the Monitor belonging to the Homestake Mine on September 26, 1878 at Canyon Creek Station.

Donahue was never officially identified as part of the gang that robbed the Monitor, but he was wanted for other stagecoach robberies, horse thefts and cattle rustling. Following the ambush and robbery of the Monitor, Donahue was apprehended on the Pine Ridge reservation by Laramie County Deputy Sheriff Frank "Whispering" Smith. On July 1, 1879 Donahue was riding in a stage coach near Buffalo Gap, South Dakota, on the way to Deadwood to stand trial when a mob of masked vigilantes halted its progress. According to Frank Smith, who was driving the stage, Donahue was dragged from the coach and hanged from a nearby tree. Smith and the other passengers of the coach were set free.

Donahue was found the next day by a passing freight convoy and was buried at the foot of the tree from which he had been hanged. A few days later a message written on a board was nailed to the tree:

Pilgrim Pause!
You're standing on
The molding clay of Limping John.
Tread lightly, stranger, on this sod.
For if he moves, you're robbed, by God

Many years later, local ranchers exhumed Donahue's body, which was still shackled, and moved it to an unknown location. One of the shackles is at the South Dakota State Historical Society in Pierre, while the other is at the 1881 Courthouse Museum in Custer.
