= Adrian Township =

Adrian Township may refer to the following places in the United States:

- Adrian Township, Kansas
- Adrian Township, Michigan
- Adrian Township, Minnesota
- Adrian Township, North Dakota
- Adrian Township, South Dakota
