= Edmunds County Courthouse =

- U.S. National Register of Historic Places
- Location within South Dakota Location within the United States
- Location: Second Ave., between 2nd and 3rd Streets, Ipswich, South Dakota
- Coordinates: 45°26′45″N 99°01′32″W
- Area: 1.5 acres (0.61 ha)
- Built: 1931
- Built by: Grey Construction Co.
- Architect: Roland R. Wilcox
- Architectural style: Art Deco
- MPS: Federal Relief Construction in South Dakota MPS
- NRHP reference No.: 00000997
- Added to NRHP: August 16, 2000

The Edmunds County Courthouse serving Edmunds County, South Dakota is located on Second Ave. in Ipswich, South Dakota. It was built in 1931 in Art Deco style as a depression-era public works project. It was listed on the National Register of Historic Places in 2000.

It is a three-story brick and stone building.
