= South Dakota Cultural Heritage Center =

Coordinates: 44.373°N 100.338°W

The South Dakota Cultural Heritage Center in Pierre, South Dakota, is the headquarters of the South Dakota State Historical Society, which also has its Archaeological Research Center in Rapid City. Opened in 1989, the center houses the State Historical Society’s administrative, historic preservation, and research and publishing offices. The Center is also the home of the State Archives and State Museum. Through these five programs, the South Dakota State Historical Society preserves and interprets the history and culture of South Dakota and its people.

The Museum of the South Dakota State Historical Society was founded in 1901. The collection has grown to over 35,000 artifacts. The State Archives was created by the State Legislature in 1975, but the origins of the archives collections date back to the creation of the State Historical Society in 1862. The State Archives contains over 17,000 cubic feet of records that document many aspects of South Dakota’s history and heritage.

== History ==
The organization in the building is the South Dakota State Historical Society, which first organized as the Old Settlers Association of Dakota Territory in 1862. After joining the union in 1889, South Dakotans recognized the need to preserve the history and culture of the new state and the newly named South Dakota Historical Society started on February 27, 1890. The group remained loosely organized until 1901, when the South Dakota state legislature established the Department of History. Doane Robinson was appointed Secretary of the State Historical Society of South Dakota and Head of the Department of History. Around 1925, Director Lawrence Fox began using the name adotped at statehood with the word "State" placed in the middle. The name has remained consistent since then. Its mission is to “collect, preserve, exhibit, and publish” materials on the history of the state.

In 1932, the South Dakota State Historical Society (Department of History) moved to the completed Soldiers and Sailors Memorial Building. This building, located directly across from the State Capitol, was erected to honor the veterans of World War I. The Soldiers and Sailors Memorial Building served as the home of the Society until 1989. In honor of the state’s centennial, the South Dakota Cultural Heritage Center was constructed to mark the anniversary.

Planning for the Cultural Heritage Center began in 1984. Dignitaries, including Governor George S. Mickelson and First Lady Linda Mickelson, broke ground on this facility for South Dakota history on May 1, 1987. State Historical Society staff settled into the building in early 1989. The building was opened to the public in May 1989 and was officially dedicated by Governor Mickelson as part of the statehood centennial’s finale on November 3, 1989.

== The Cultural Heritage Center ==
The Cultural Heritage Center is a 68,000-square-foot, mostly underground building that resembles the earthen lodges of the Arikara Indians that historically lived throughout the Missouri River Valley. The building is covered with native prairie sod from Jones County and landscaped with native grasses and plants.

The building’s construction provides climate control, energy efficiency, and minimum potential for damage to artifacts housed in the collections of the Museum and Archives.

The Cultural Heritage Center is constructed on a series of piers, varying in depth from thirty feet to sixty-five feet deep, on which a slab rests. The ground on which the piers rest is mostly shale. The original north half of the building is over an ancient glacial sandbar, causing the original building to move in two different directions. The new collections storage annex on the north end of the building is also built on shale. The slab is eight to ten inches thick, depending on location. The gallery has an initial slab that is ten inches thick, over which a grid of channels was laid to facilitate electrifying the exhibit. That grid was buried under an additional four inches of concrete. The building is served by twenty-two heat pumps following the renovation. The storage annex addition contains high-density storage that reaches fourteen feet high and was designed to serve the Society's collecting responsibility for twenty to thirty years. The roof is flat but terraced with five levels beginning on the Governors Avenue side and going to the east. The highest point is the air exchange tower. The interior effect creates ceilings from eighteen to twenty-four feet high. The original intent was to enable growth by expanding vertically. However, later soil testing did not support that intent, meaning during the renovation additional storage space had to be added to the footprint.

On May 2, 2023, the Cultural Heritage Center broke ground on a major renovation that temporarily closed its in-person operation. The museum took exhibits on the road and the archives assisted researchers remotely. ISG of Pierre assisted the state with architectural services to improve the facility. McGough Construction of Sioux Falls was hired to implement the construction documents. Staff returned to the facility following substantial completion in October 2024. The archives resumed in-person research on July 8, 2025. The museum had an initial opening on July 1, 2026.

== Museum of the South Dakota State Historical Society ==
The nearly 14,000-square-foot Museum gallery explores the economic, social, political, and cultural history of Dakota Territory and South Dakota. The Museum’s primary exhibit, ‘’The South Dakota Experience’’, is arranged topically to accommodate new research and further developments.

The Museum is open to the public six days a week. For information on hours and admission visit the South Dakota Cultural Heritage Center online at South Dakota State Historical Society.

== South Dakota State Archives ==
The South Dakota State Archives contains over 17,000 cubic feet of records that document South Dakota’s history and heritage. The South Dakota State Archives has been digitizing the state's primary sources since 2012 as the South Dakota Digital Archives, which has photos maps, manuscripts and more. For more information on the South Dakota State Archives; including online resources for genealogists, researchers, teachers, and students; visit online at South Dakota State Historical Society.

The South Dakota State Archives is open to the public for research Monday through Friday. For information on hours and fees visit the South Dakota Cultural Heritage Center online at South Dakota State Historical Society.
