= Preachers Run =

Stream in South Dakota, U.S.

Coordinates: 45°10′44″N 98°45′38″W

Preachers Run is a stream in Edmunds County, in the U.S. state of South Dakota. It flows through the city of Ipswich, South Dakota.

Preachers Run was named in memory of a pioneer preacher who disappeared near the creek.

== See also ==
- List of rivers of South Dakota
