= Plainview Colony, South Dakota =

- Census-designated place
- Location within South Dakota Location within the United States
- Coordinates: 45°34′51″N 99°00′34″W
- Country: United States
- State: South Dakota
- County: Edmunds

Area
  - Total: 0.21 sq mi (0.55 km^{2})
  - Land: 0.21 sq mi (0.55 km^{2})
  - Water: 0 sq mi (0.00 km^{2})
- Elevation: 1,585 ft (483 m)

Population (2020)
  - Total: 100
  - Density: 474.5/sq mi (183.19/km^{2})
- Time zone: UTC-6 (Central (CST))
  - Summer (DST): UTC-5 (CDT)
- ZIP Code: 57456 (Leola)
- Area code: 605
- FIPS code: 46-49980
- GNIS feature ID: 2807100

Plainview Colony is a Hutterite colony and census-designated place (CDP) in Edmunds County, South Dakota, United States. It was first listed as a CDP prior to the 2020 census. The population of the CDP was 100 at the 2020 census.

It is in the northeast part of the county, 10 miles (16 km) north of Ipswich, the county seat. Deerfield Colony is 5 miles (8 km) to the east.

== Demographics ==
In the 2020 Census, Plainview Colony had a population of 100 people. The colony unanimously identifies as white with no second ethnicity.
