= Pembrook Colony, South Dakota =

- Census-designated place
- Location within South Dakota Location within the United States
- Coordinates: 45°22′27″N 98°59′55″W
- Country: United States
- State: South Dakota
- County: Edmunds

Area
  - Total: 0.19 sq mi (0.48 km^{2})
  - Land: 0.18 sq mi (0.46 km^{2})
  - Water: 0.0077 sq mi (0.02 km^{2})
- Elevation: 1,483 ft (452 m)

Population (2020)
  - Total: 135
  - Density: 753.3/sq mi (290.87/km^{2})
- Time zone: UTC-6 (Central (CST))
  - Summer (DST): UTC-5 (CDT)
- ZIP Code: 57451 (Ipswich)
- Area code: 605
- FIPS code: 46-49028
- GNIS feature ID: 2813020

Pembrook Colony is a Hutterite colony and census-designated place (CDP) in Edmunds County, South Dakota, United States. It was first listed as a CDP prior to the 2020 census. The population of the CDP was 135 at the 2020 census.

It is in the eastern part of the county, 5 miles (8 km) south of Ipswich, the county seat.

== Demographics ==
Historical population
Census	Pop.	Note	%±
2020	135		—
U.S. Decennial Census

== Education ==
It is in the Ipswich School District 22-6.
