= J. W. Parmley =

American politician

Joseph William Lincoln Parmley (January 12, 1861 – December 12, 1940) was an American pioneer and early developer of the north central region of South Dakota during its early statehood. He is considered the "Father of the Yellowstone Trail," and is today memorialized by the J. W. Parmley Historical Home and Parmley Western Land Office museums in Ipswich, South Dakota.

== Life and family ==
Joseph William Lincoln Parmley was born January 12, 1861, in Mifflin, Wisconsin to parents originally from Durham County, England. His father was also named Joseph Parmley. His mother, Jane Ashton Parmley, died when he was seventeen. He had a brother, John Pearson Parmley, and a sister, Sarah Tamar Parmley. In Wisconsin, he attended school at Platteview Normal in Platteville, and also Lawrence College at Appleton.

On October 13, 1887, he married Melissa Baker, who was also of English descent and grew up in Wisconsin. They had three children: Loren, Irene, and Bernice, who died before she was two of scarlet fever. J. W. Parmley died on December 12, 1940.

== Pioneer of Edmunds County, South Dakota ==
In spring 1883 J. W. Parmley, aged 22 years and fresh out of college, arrived at Aberdeen, which was the end of the railroad line in what was then Dakota Territory. After walking 40 miles further west, he and two other pioneers who arrived at the same time staked out claims at the center of what would become Edmunds County, South Dakota. The pioneers named their settlement "Roscoe," after noted senator Roscoe Conkling, and built a large tent. This tent, which they named the Cottonade Hotel (J. W. Parmley was the cook), served to attract later pioneers travelling through the country on their way to further west settlements along the Missouri River: Le Beau, Rugstad, and Mobridge. The county was officially organized in summer 1883 as "a great wave of settlement spread over the east half of the county … The prairie was often barren as it had been burned off. [The settlers] had to buy their supplies in Aberdeen, a three day trip."

== County and state official ==
Parmley's first taste of public life came immediately once Edmunds County was organized and the territorial superintendent, General William Henry Harrison Beadle, appointed him superintendent of schools. Parmley met many settlers while making visits to every school scattered across the county, and "his personable character and educational background were quickly recognized." This burgeoning network may have led to his political ambitions. He also eventually served Edmunds County as Register of Deeds, County Clerk, and County Judge.

J. W. Parmley passed the South Dakota bar examination in 1887, was twice elected to the South Dakota House of Representatives in 1905 and 1907, and ran for U.S. Congress as a Republican but was ultimately beaten by the popular incumbent from Aberdeen, Royal Johnson. He was nominated to various state commissions, boards, or representative positions by seven different governors, including his post as South Dakota Highway Commissioner in 1925 and a nomination to the Board of Regents in 1933.

== Economic developer ==
Parmley was passionate about road building, and this makes up a large part of his legacy. He is still known today as the "Father of the Yellowstone Trail."

In 1905, Parmley purchased his first car, and his grandson Joe Trotzig later recalled, "He always had at least two cars during his prosperous years." In 1907, his first attempt at road policy was undertaken with a bill in the state legislature to have road work named the responsibility of county commissioners, but the bill was literally laughed at by other legislators, and defeated. Nonetheless, J. W. Parmley and other area businessmen felt the need for a good road between Ipswich, SD and Aberdeen to spur economic development. In 1910, Parmley organized a caravan to travel from Aberdeen to Mobridge - rough country with hills and sloughs. But from that first path, Parmley expanded the idea farther to encompass the entire region between Minneapolis and Yellowstone Park, then ultimately "a good road from Plymouth Rock to Puget Sound."

The first conference to organize the Yellowstone Trail was held in 1912, and Parmley was elected president of the Yellowstone Trail Association. The association members, community leaders from towns all across Minnesota and South Dakota and later other states as well, acted to advocate tax dollars for road infrastructure and encourage motorists, who were a new breed in America at that time, to go through their towns on their way to Yellowstone Park. By 1916, the trail had its slogan and J. W. Parmley was among those who physically stenciled its markers - a yellow circle with a black arrow pointing the way - on rocks and utility poles along the track used by motorists. It was America's first coast to coast highway though the upper tier of states, and the roads that carried the Yellowstone Trail now carry many route markings, including, in places U.S. Highway 10 and 12, interstate 90 and 94 and many others. The final segment of this highway was hard surfaced in 1950.

Parmley also made a less successful effort to create a "Canada to Coast" highway from The Pas, Manitoba to the Panama Canal. For this effort, he was named the president of the C to C Highway Association, and, while the highway itself never came to fruition, his activities as a booster in the Turtle Mountains of North Dakota later brought about the International Peace Garden.

== Other pursuits ==
Always striving to help the young communities of Edmunds County thrive, J. W. Parmley, along with Henry Huck, published newspapers named the Edmunds County Weekly News, the Roscoe Herald, and the South Dakota Tribune. He merged the papers to create the Ipswich Tribune, which he sold to C.L. Jackson in 1911 and which is still published today. He was able to use free railroad passes issued to newspaper editors to travel the country and publicize Edmunds County, and to attend State Press Association meetings and become known as a strong speaker and promoter of causes.

He also owned the Edmunds County Abstract Co. and worked at that business until a year before his death. This was conducted in the Parmley Western Land Office he built at 115 Main Street, Ipswich, South Dakota. This unique building, which is listed in the National Register of Historic Places, was constructed of native roughcut prairie granite in 1900. Its fireplace contains many mementos gathered by Parmley during his travels: shells, petrified wood, and Native American artifacts.

J. W. Parmley also owned farmland on the north edge of Ipswich and maintained a large barnyard behind his house in town. When he brought his new wife to see it in 1887, she said, "I guess it's a good farm if anything is good in South Dakota." At the farm, Parmley kept a large herd of Shetland ponies, which were a novelty to other residents, and which were unforgettable to children who grew up in the era between 1903 and 1940 in Ipswich, South Dakota. The ponies were purchased on the advice of a doctor who though they would get the Parmleys' son Loren outside to improve his croup and asthma. But they were also used as cart ponies for Melissa ... and as great political tools. As the herd of ponies expanded, J. W. would lend one to any country child that promised to ride it to school and take good care of it.

The couple actually lived from 1920 on in the all-concrete home J. W. built in Ipswich to protect their family from fire, one of the frequent threats to pioneer settlements on the prairie. That distinctive home also features fireplaces with unique mementos, and it was entered on the National Register of Historic Places in 1980. Melissa "Lissie" Parmley eventually grew to love and defend the state where she raised her children.

== Museums ==
The home built by J. W. Parmley still stands today along Highway 45 in Ipswich, South Dakota and is maintained by the all-volunteer J. W. Parmley Historical Home Society. Since 1983, the Society has maintained at the home a collection of Parmley memorabilia, pioneer artifacts, and the material once contained in the Edmunds County Museum. Since 2005, the Society has also used the Parmley Western Land Office to display historical exhibits of early business activities in Edmunds County.

These museums are free and open to the public three days a week between Memorial Day and Labor Day.

== Advocacy ==
As a public speaker, J. W. Parmley famously advocated for good roads, but he also spoke on the following topics: peace and the establishment of the International Peace Garden, the development of hydroelectric power, soil conservation, diversified farming practices, oil prospecting, bridge building, water conservation, the development of Mount Rushmore, preventing forest fires, and the use of prairie stone in building. He also spoke of beautifying towns with flowers on vacant lots and public places, which was prescient as the Edmunds County Memorial Park is now located adjacent to the Parmley Western Land Office in a formerly vacant Main Street lot. Another speaking topic - dam building for artificial lakes - was rewarded when Snake Creek in eastern Edmunds County was dammed in 1932 and the resulting lake was named Lake Parmley (now within Mina Lake State Recreation Area).

== Legacy ==
Parmley was named to the South Dakota Highway Hall of Fame in 1972 and the South Dakota Cowboy and Western Heritage Hall of Fame in 1981.
