= List of nature centers in South Dakota =

South Dakota Nature Centers (Hover mouse over pog to popup clickable link)

This is a list of nature centers and environmental education centers in the state of South Dakota.

To use the sortable tables: click on the icons at the top of each column to sort that column in alphabetical order; click again for reverse alphabetical order.

Name	Location	County	Region	Summary
Adams Homestead and Nature Preserve	McCook Lake	Union	East River	website, 1,500 acres, operated by the State
Badlands National Park	Interior	Jackson	West River	64,144 acres, interpretive exhibits and programs at the Ben Reifel Visitor Center
Custer State Park	Custer	Custer	Black Hills	Over 71,000 acres, Peter Norbeck Visitor Center exhibits, summer nature programs
Dakota Nature Park	Brookings	Brookings	East River	website, 135 acres, operated by the City
Lacreek National Wildlife Refuge	Martin	Bennett	West River	16,410 acres, visitor center displays
Lake Andes National Wildlife Refuge Complex	Lake Andes	Charles Mix	East River	5,638 acres
Sand Lake National Wildlife Refuge	Columbia	Brown	East River	21,498 acres, visitor center displays, observation tower
The Outdoor Campus - East	Sioux Falls	Minnehaha	East River	website, operated by the State, education about outdoor skills, wildlife, conservation and management practices
The Outdoor Campus - West	Rapid City	Pennington	Black Hills	website, 32 acres, operated by the State, education about outdoor skills, wildlife, conservation and management practices
