= Deerfield Colony, South Dakota =

- Census-designated place
- Location within South Dakota Location within the United States
- Coordinates: 45°35′15″N 98°53′58″W
- Country: United States
- State: South Dakota
- County: Edmunds

Area
  - Total: 0.47 sq mi (1.23 km^{2})
  - Land: 0.47 sq mi (1.23 km^{2})
  - Water: 0 sq mi (0.00 km^{2})
- Elevation: 1,493 ft (455 m)

Population (2020)
  - Total: 128
  - Density: 270.6/sq mi (104.48/km^{2})
- Time zone: UTC-6 (Central (CST))
  - Summer (DST): UTC-5 (CDT)
- ZIP Code: 57451 (Ipswich)
- Area code: 605
- FIPS code: 46-15774
- GNIS feature ID: 2813019

Deerfield Colony is a Hutterite colony and census-designated place (CDP) in Edmunds County, South Dakota, United States. It was first listed as a CDP prior to the 2020 census. The population of the CDP was 128 at the 2020 census.

It is in the northeast part of the county, bordered to the north by McPherson County. It is 16 miles (26 km) northeast of Ipswich, the county seat, and 27 miles (43 km) northwest of Aberdeen. Plainview Colony is 5 miles (8 km) to the west, and Long Lake Colony is the same distance to the northeast.

== Demographics ==
Historical population
Census	Pop.	Note	%±
2020	128		—
U.S. Decennial Census
