= Mifflin, Wisconsin =

- Town
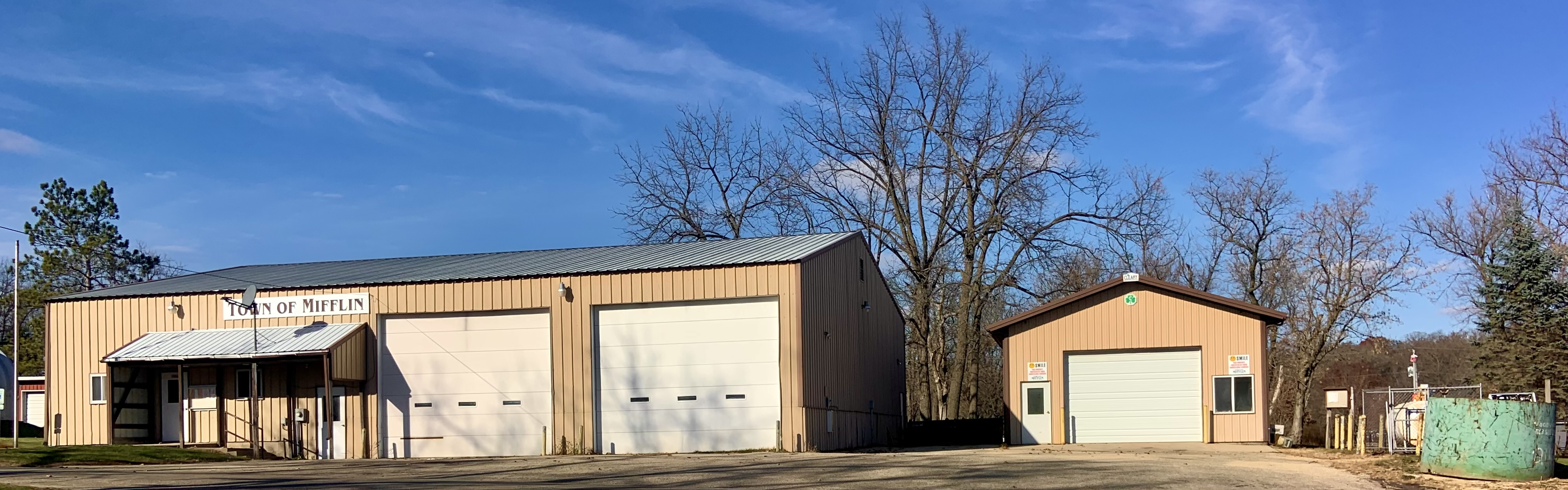
- Town hall

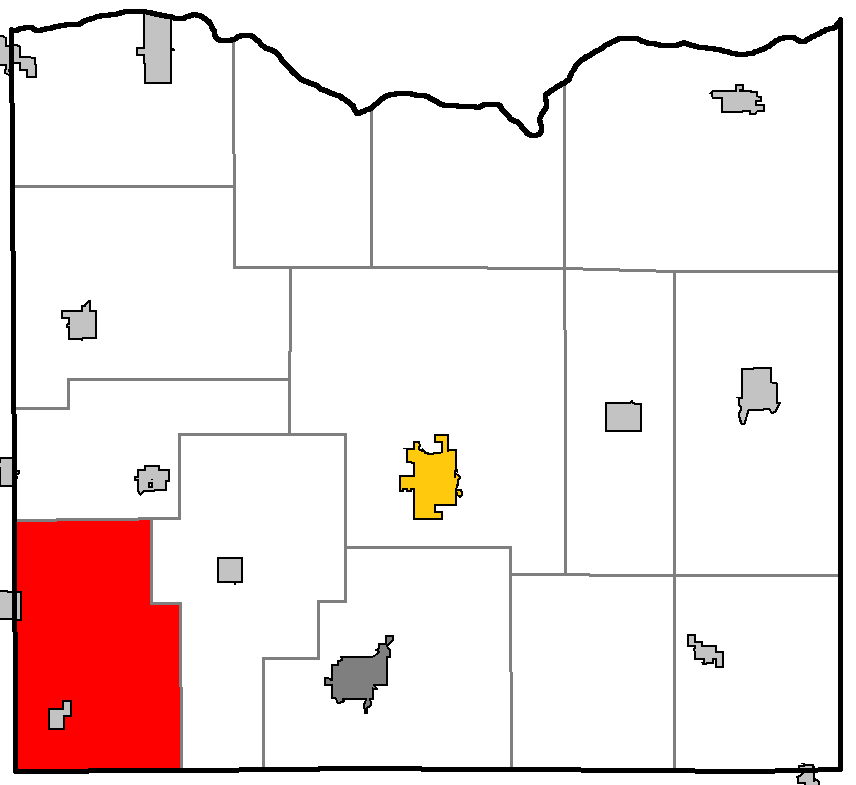
- Location of Mifflin, within Iowa County, Wisconsin

- Location of Iowa County, Wisconsin
- Coordinates: 42°52′19″N 90°21′12″W
- Country: United States
- State: Wisconsin
- County: Iowa

Area
  - Total: 50.7 sq mi (131.3 km^{2})
  - Land: 50.7 sq mi (131.3 km^{2})
  - Water: 0 sq mi (0.0 km^{2})
- Elevation: 980 ft (300 m)

Population (2020)
  - Total: 558
  - Density: 11.0/sq mi (4.25/km^{2})
- Time zone: UTC-6 (Central (CST))
  - Summer (DST): UTC-5 (CDT)
- Area code: 608
- FIPS code: 55-51725
- GNIS feature ID: 1583713

Mifflin is a town in Iowa County, Wisconsin, United States. The population was 558 at the 2020 census. The unincorporated community of Mifflin is located in the town. The extinct community of Dallas was located in the town.

== History ==
On April 14, 2010, a fireball from outer space streaked across several Midwestern states and landed outside of Mifflin. The highly publicized Mifflin fireball, as it is now known, has produced several pounds of meteorites, and was featured on The Science Channel's Meteorite Men. The meteorite has been studied and classified as a L5 chondrite by scientists at the University of Wisconsin.

== Geography ==
According to the United States Census Bureau, the town has a total area of 50.7 square miles (131.3 km^{2}), all land.

== Demographics ==
As of the census of 2000, there were 617 people, 201 households, and 163 families residing in the town. The population density was 12.2 people per square mile (4.7/km^{2}). There were 209 housing units at an average density of 4.1 per square mile (1.6/km^{2}). The racial makeup of the town was 99.51% White, 0.16% African American, and 0.32% from two or more races. Hispanic or Latino of any race were 0.49% of the population.

There were 201 households, out of which 47.8% had children under the age of 18 living with them, 74.1% were married couples living together, 2.5% had a female householder with no husband present, and 18.9% were non-families. 15.9% of all households were made up of individuals, and 10.0% had someone living alone who was 65 years of age or older. The average household size was 3.07 and the average family size was 3.47.

In the town, the population was spread out, with 35.0% under the age of 18, 4.4% from 18 to 24, 28.8% from 25 to 44, 23.5% from 45 to 64, and 8.3% who were 65 years of age or older. The median age was 35 years. For every 100 females, there were 98.4 males. For every 100 females age 18 and over, there were 109.9 males.

The median income for a household in the town was $42,083, and the median income for a family was $46,250. Males had a median income of $23,409 versus $21,806 for females. The per capita income for the town was $15,129. About 5.1% of families and 11.5% of the population were below the poverty line, including 17.7% of those under age 18 and 9.8% of those age 65 or over.

== Notable people ==
- Daniel B. Moore, American Civil War veteran and Medal of Honor recipient
- J.W. Parmley, South Dakota legislator
- Jefferson Rewey, Wisconsin legislator
