= Daniel B. Moore =

United States Army Medal of Honor recipient

- Born: Daniel Bedford Moore; June 12, 1838; Mifflin, Territory of Wisconsin
- Died: July 2, 1914 (aged 76)
- Military career
- Allegiance: United States; Union
- Branch: United States Army; Union Army
- Service years: 1861–1865
- Rank: Sergeant; Brevet Captain
- Units: Company E, 11th Wisconsin Volunteer Infantry Regiment
- Conflicts: American Civil War
- Awards: Medal of Honor

Daniel Bedford Moore (June 12, 1838 – July 2, 1914) served in the Union Army during the American Civil War. He received the Medal of Honor.

Moore was born on June 12, 1838, in Mifflin, Wisconsin. His older brother is said to have been the first white child born in Wisconsin.

He enlisted in Company E, 11th Wisconsin Volunteer Infantry Regiment on 9 September 1861. During the Battle of Fort Blakeley on 9 April 1865, Sgt. Moore saved the life of 1st Lieutenant Angus R. McDonald. Lieut. McDonald was leading an advanced skirmish party in the storming of a Confederate earthenwork fortification, when a Confederate States Army officer and twelve enlisted men launched a counterattack while crying, "No quarter to the damned Yankees!" Lt. McDonald was shot through the thigh and was repeatedly bayoneted by a Confederate soldier until Sgt. Moore picked up a fallen Rebel soldier's musket and shot Lt. McDonald's attacker dead. After a 15-minute engagement, the standard of the 11th Wisconsin Regiment was planted atop the captured Fort. Sgt. Moore was wounded in action during the same engagement.

Daniel Moore was mustered out of the United States Army with the brevet rank of Captain on 4 September 1865.

Moore died on July 2, 1914, and lies buried at Graceland Cemetery in Mineral Point, Wisconsin.

== Medal of Honor citation ==
His award citation reads:

For extraordinary heroism on 9 April 1865, while serving with Company E, 11th Wisconsin Infantry, in action at Fort Blakely, Alabama. At the risk of his own life Corporal Moore saved the life of an officer who had been shot down and overpowered by superior numbers.

== See also ==
- List of Medal of Honor recipients
- List of American Civil War Medal of Honor recipients: M–P
