= Marcus P. Beebe Library =

- U.S. National Register of Historic Places
- Location within South Dakota Location within the United States
- Location: Main St. and 2nd Ave., Ipswich, South Dakota
- Coordinates: 45°26′15″N 99°01′31″W
- Area: 1 acre (0.40 ha)
- Built: 1930-31
- Built by: Williams, John D.
- Architect: Erickson, Allen E.
- Architectural style: Tudor Revival
- NRHP reference No.: 77001243
- Added to NRHP: November 16, 1977

The Marcus P. Beebe Library, located at Main St. and 2nd Ave. in Ipswich, South Dakota, was built in 1930–1931. It is also known as the Ipswich Public Library. It was listed on the National Register of Historic Places in 1977.

Architect Allen E. Erickson designed the building and it was built under supervision of John D. Williams. It is a one-and-a-half-story half-timbered Tudor Revival building with walls made of granite stone.
