= Powell, Edmunds County, South Dakota =

Unincorporated community in South Dakota, U.S.

Coordinates: 45°17′19″N 99°01′51″W

Powell is an unincorporated community in Edmunds County, in the U.S. state of South Dakota.

== History ==
A post office called Powell was established in 1883, and remained in operation until 1908. The community was named for William E. Powell, a railroad official.
