= Ipswich State Bank =

- U.S. National Register of Historic Places
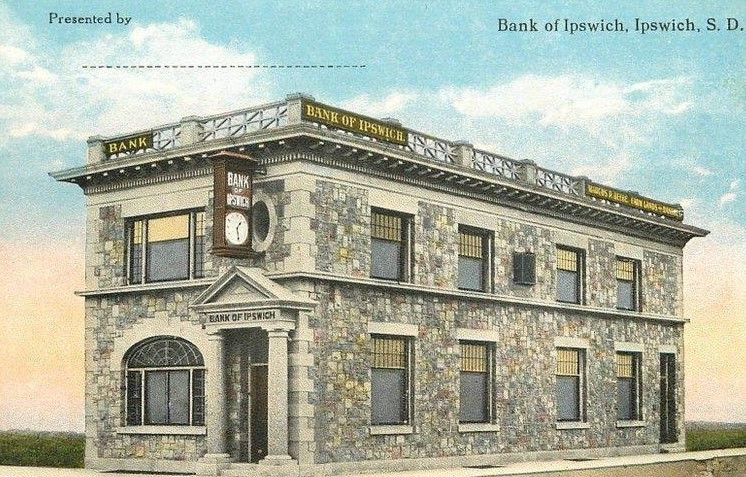
- Postcard image

- Location within South Dakota Location within the United States
- Location: 1st Ave. and Main St., Ipswich, South Dakota
- Coordinates: 45°26′12″N 99°1′30″W
- Area: 1 acre (0.40 ha)
- Built: 1905
- Built by: Keith Co.; Beebe, M.P.
- Architectural style: Classical Revival
- NRHP reference No.: 78002551
- Added to NRHP: May 22, 1978

The Ipswich State Bank, located at 1st Ave. and Main St. in Ipswich, South Dakota, was built in 1905. It was listed on the National Register of Historic Places in 1978.

It is a two-story native stone building with quoins, with elements of Classical Revival style.

It was deemed "the best example of a neo-classic revival commercial building in Ipswich, South Dakota. It also has been the center of many of the most important financial transactions of the area, and as the home of Marcus P. Beebe's land offices, it was significant in the development of the area."
