= J.W. Parmley House =

Historic house in South Dakota, United States

- J. W. Parmley House
- U.S. National Register of Historic Places
- Location within South Dakota Location within the United States
- Location: 4th St. and 4th Ave., Ipswich, South Dakota
- Coordinates: 45°26′38″N 99°01′48″W
- Area: less than one acre
- Built: 1920
- Built by: Madison, C.J.
- Architectural style: Bungalow/craftsman
- NRHP reference No.: 80003720
- Added to NRHP: June 4, 1980

The J.W. Parmley House, at 4th St. and 4th Ave. in Ipswich, South Dakota, was built in 1920. It was listed on the National Register of Historic Places in 1980.

It is a one-and-a-half-story bungalow-style house built of brick and granite.
