= South Dakota State Historical Society Press =

The South Dakota State Historical Society Press is an American book publishing company based in Pierre, South Dakota. It was established in 1997 as part of the South Dakota State Historical Society (SDSHS). Its mission is to preserve and promote the history of South Dakota.

Books by the SDSHS Press have won national awards including the Aesop Accolade, Moonbeam Children's Book Award, Western Writers of America Spur Award, and Independent Publisher Book Award.

In 2014, the company gained national news attention when it published Laura Ingalls Wilder's Pioneer Girl: The Annotated Autobiography, which sold out all 15,000 copies within weeks.
