= Lincoln Borglum Museum =

Museum in the Mount Rushmore National Memorial with two 125-seat theaters

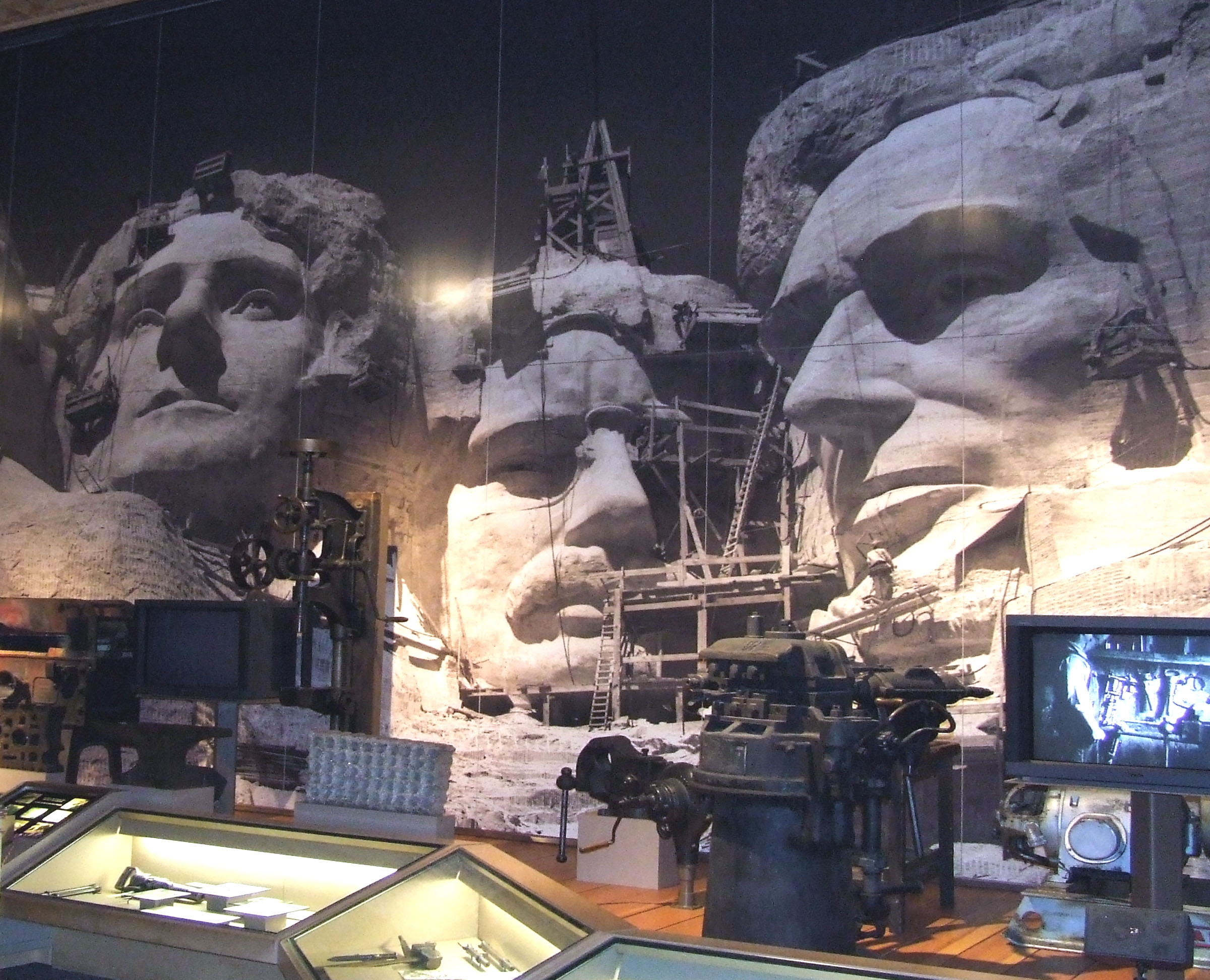

- Location within South Dakota
- Location: Black Hills, Pennington County, South Dakota
- Coordinates: 43°52′37″N 103°27′22″W
- Type: Relief Art
- Website: Lincoln Borglum Museum

The Lincoln Borglum Museum is located in the Mount Rushmore National Memorial near Keystone, South Dakota. It features two 125-seat theaters that show a 13-minute movie about Mount Rushmore. A view thought by many to be one of the best is located at Grandview Terrace, above the Museum. The Presidential Trail, a walking trail and boardwalk, starts at Grandview Terrace and winds through the Ponderosa pine forests to the Sculptor's Studio, providing close-up views of the memorial. The Sculptor's studio was built by Gutzon Borglum, and features discussion about the construction of the monument as well as the tools used. The amphitheater also has a 30-minute program at dusk that describes the construction of the memorial. Following that, the mountain is illuminated for two hours.

== See also ==
- Lincoln Borglum
