= Loyalton, South Dakota =

Unincorporated community in South Dakota, U.S.

Coordinates: 45°17′11″N 99°16′46″W

Loyalton is an unincorporated community in Edmunds County, in the U.S. state of South Dakota.

== History ==
A post office at Loyalton was established in 1886, and remained in operation until 1974. A large share of the first settlers being Union Army war veterans most likely caused the name to be selected.
