= Adrian Township, Edmunds County, South Dakota =

Adrian Township, South Dakota
- Township
- Location within South Dakota Location within the United States
- Coordinates: 45°32′32″N 99°9′51″W
- Country: United States
- State: South Dakota
- County: Edmunds

Area
  - Total: 35.7 sq mi (92.4 km^{2})
  - Land: 35.6 sq mi (92.2 km^{2})
  - Water: 0.039 sq mi (0.1 km^{2})
- Elevation: 1,749 ft (533 m)

Population (2000)
  - Total: 14
  - Density: 0.52/sq mi (0.2/km^{2})
- Time zone: UTC-6 (Central (CST))
  - Summer (DST): UTC-5 (CDT)
- Area code: 605
- FIPS code: 46-00340
- GNIS feature ID: 1268400

Adrian Township is a township in Edmunds County, South Dakota, United States.
