= St. Augustine Church (Dallas, South Dakota) =

Historic church in South Dakota, United States

- U.S. National Register of Historic Places
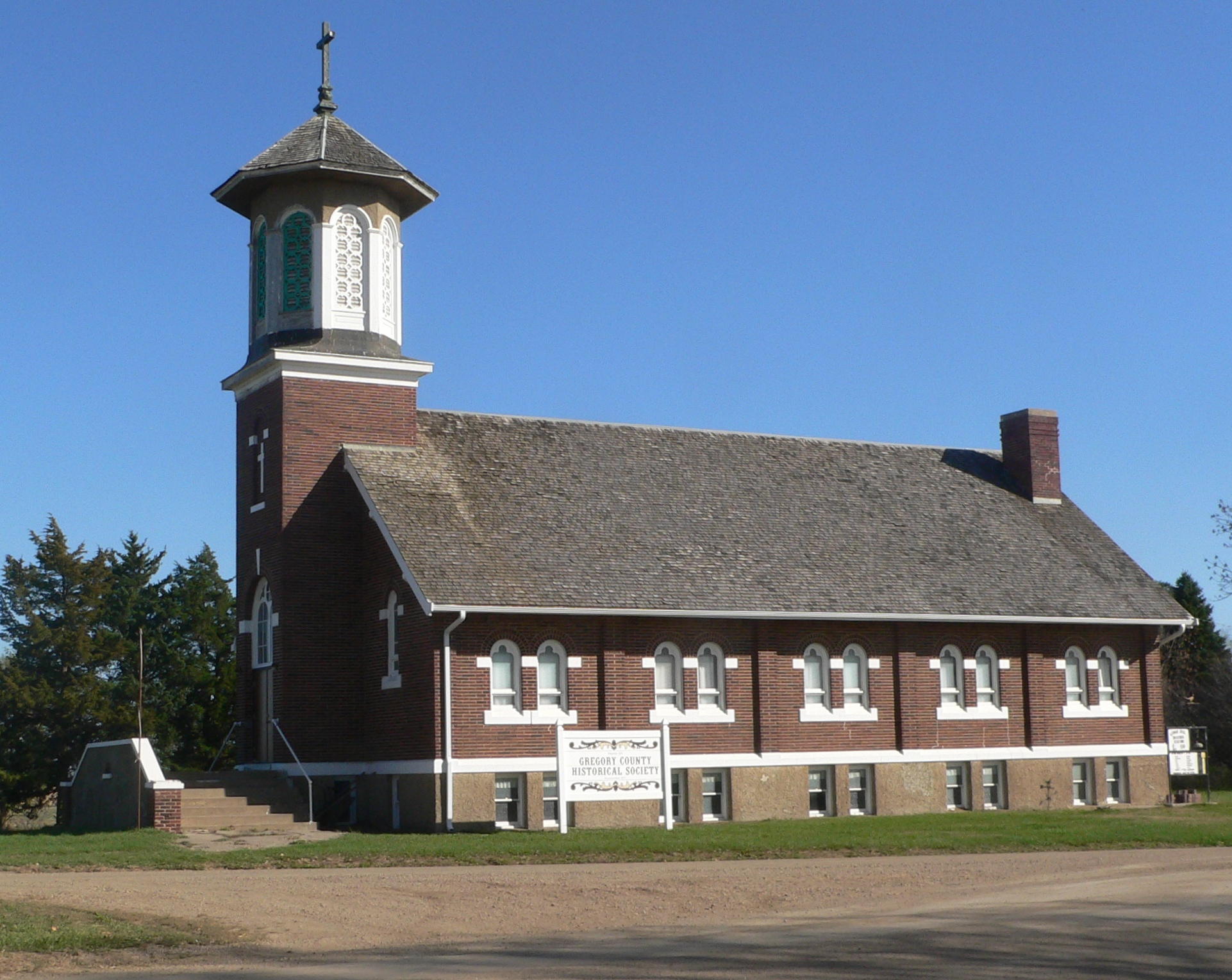

- Location within South Dakota Location within the United States
- Location: SE Corner of 6th St. and Main St., Dallas, South Dakota
- Coordinates: 43.233864°N 99.517055°W
- Built: 1925
- Architect: John Hayes
- Architectural style: Romanesque
- NRHP reference No.: 09000944
- Added to NRHP: November 20, 2009

St. Augustine Church is a former Catholic church located at the southeast corner of 6th and Main Streets in Dallas, South Dakota, United States. It currently houses the Gregory County History Museum, which is operated by the Gregory County Historical Society.

The church was built in 1925 and was added to the National Register of Historic Places in 2009.
