= Parmley Land Office =

- U.S. National Register of Historic Places
- Location within South Dakota Location within the United States
- Location: Main St., Ipswich, South Dakota
- Coordinates: 45°26′11″N 99°01′44″W
- Area: less than one acre
- Built: 1900
- NRHP reference No.: 79002402
- Added to NRHP: March 26, 1979

The Parmley Land Office, on Main St. in Ipswich, South Dakota, was built in 1900. It has also been known as the Fireplace Bar. It was listed on the National Register of Historic Places in 1979.

Numerous land transactions were executed at the office during a land boom from 1900 to 1910 during which land was often sold at price of ten dollars per acre; dry years of 1910 and 1911 cut down the activity.
