= Austin–Whittemore House =

Historic house in South Dakota, United States

- U.S. National Register of Historic Places
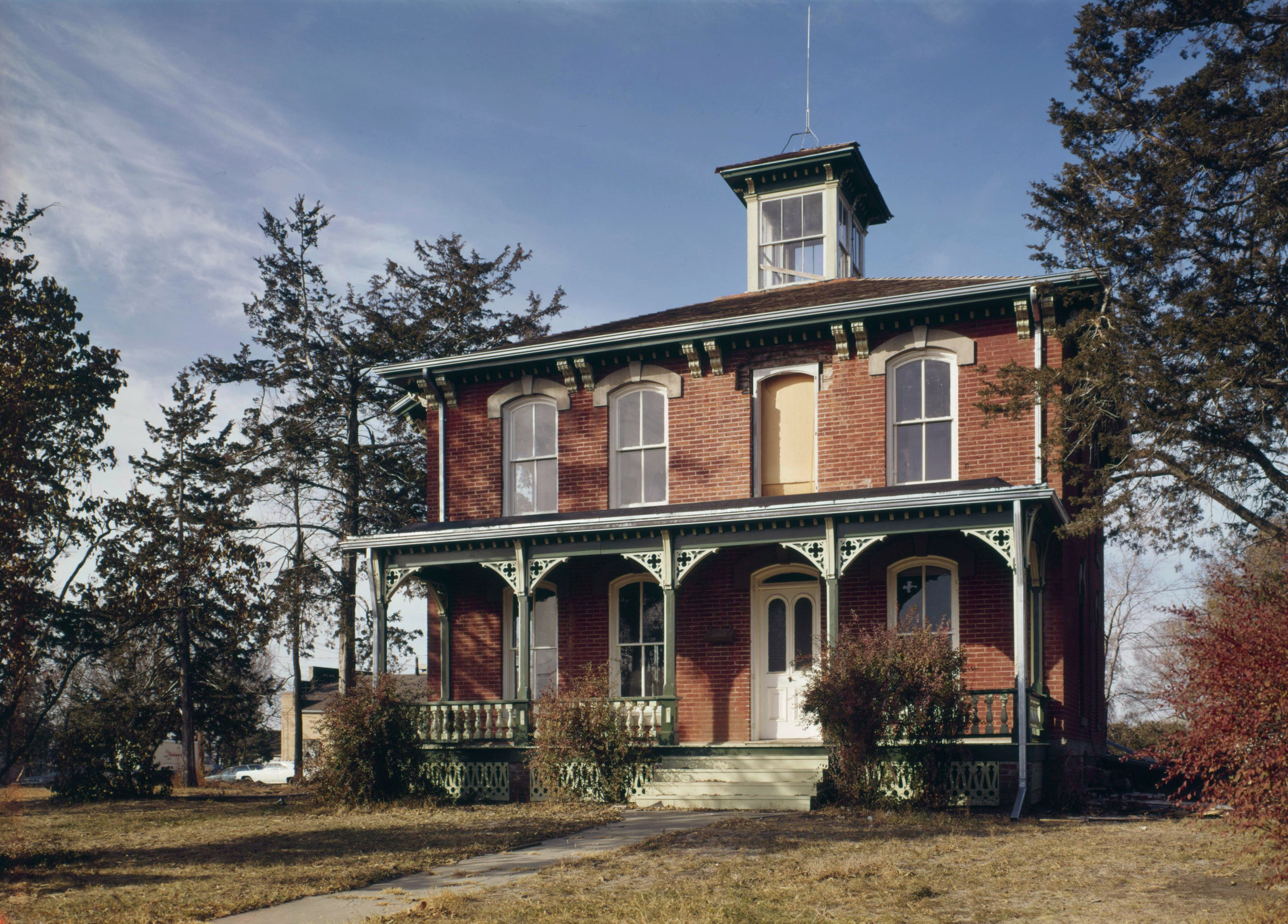

- Location within South Dakota Location within the United States
- Location: 15 Austin Avenue, Vermillion, South Dakota
- Coordinates: 42°46′44″N 96°56′07″W
- Area: less than one acre
- Built: 1884
- Built by: Horace J. Austin
- Architectural style: Late Victorian, Italianate
- NRHP reference No.: 72001225
- Added to NRHP: October 18, 1972

The Austin–Whittemore House, sometimes referred to as the Austin–Whittemore Museum, is a historic building in Vermillion, South Dakota. Originally a private residence built in 1884, it is now a historic house museum and the headquarters of the Clay County Historical Society. It was listed on the National Register of Historic Places in 1972.

== History ==
The house was built in 1884 by Horace J. Austin, who was one of the earliest settlers in this area of Dakota Territory. He arrived in 1859 and worked surveying the surrounding homesteads. He met his wife, Rachel Ross, while attending services at the First Baptist Church of Vermillion. Austin later served as a Dakota Territory legislator until his death in 1891. Rachel remodeled the house after his death, moving the grand staircase to the front foyer, installing a greenhouse on the rear of the building, and building a new dining room and parlor. The Austins' adopted daughter, Pansy, married Arthur Whittemore and the couple made their home here. Upon Pansy's death, ownership of the house passed to her only son, Arthur Whittemore, Jr., who had become a musician; however, he decided to remain at his home in New York and sell the ancestral house, with the intention that it be torn down due to it falling into disrepair. The wife of then-University of South Dakota President Richard L. Bowen, Connie Bowen, led a group of concerned citizens who bought the house and the surrounding lots, and formed the Clay County Historical Society. Due to its association with Horace Austin and the Whittemore family, the house was listed on the National Register of Historic Places on October 18, 1972.

== Architecture ==
The Austin–Whittemore House is one of the last surviving examples of 1800s architecture in the Vermillion area, and it has been preserved mostly as it was at the time of construction. It reflects a merging of Late Victorian architecture, particularly Italianate, with adaptations stylistic of the American frontier. The two-story house itself is built of out red bricks. A small wooden staircase leads to covered front porch. A large cupola sits atop its hipped roof. It also contains disused stable and buggy facilities and an earthen basement on the property. In 2014, the Clay County Historical Society purchased, remodeled, and moved a replica of Vermillion's first schoolhouse to the grounds. The replica, built in 1939, commemorates the original schoolhouse that was built in 1864 and destroyed in the Great Flood of 1881.
