= East River (South Dakota) =

Region of South Dakota, United States

Coordinates: 45°N 98°W

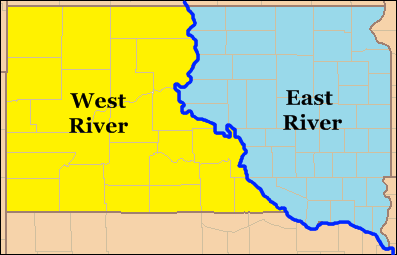
The Missouri River divides South Dakota into the regions of West River (yellow) and East River (blue).

The East River portion of South Dakota refers to the section of the state lying east of the Missouri River. Geographical distinctions between the eastern and western sections of the state were reinforced by differing patterns of European-American settlement and Native American resettlement during the 19th and 20th centuries.

The eastern half of South Dakota was heavily glaciated and is largely covered by glacial till and loamy soil, which has lent itself to agricultural uses. The Missouri River roughly follows the 100th meridian in the state, and areas to the west of the meridian receive less rainfall. From 1849 to 1858, this was the now-South Dakota portion of the Minnesota Territory. The East River region was generally capable of supporting homesteaders on the standard 160-acre plots of the era during the wetter-than average years between 1879 and 1885; prolonged droughts between 1886 and 1897, however, severely affected the region's farmers. In 1889, this land became part of the new state of South Dakota.

During the second half of the 19th century, about 350,000 immigrants from western and northern Europe settled to the east of the Missouri. The later European immigrants, however, predominantly from southern and eastern Europe, settled in the West River region after 1889, when the federal government made some 9 million acres of former Lakota land available for purchase after breaking up the Great Sioux Reservation, established under the Fort Laramie Treaty of 1868. It reassigned Native Americans to five smaller reservations in West River, and two in East River.

About 70% of South Dakota's population in the 1990s was located in the East River region, which includes major businesses, industries and state government. This area includes the state's largest city, Sioux Falls, and Pierre, the state capital, located on the east bank of the Missouri River.

Counties in the East River region of the state include: Aurora, Beadle, Bon Homme. Brookings, Brown, Brule, Buffalo, Campbell, Charles Mix, Clark, Clay, Codington, Davison, Day, Deuel, Douglas, Edmunds, Faulk, Grant, Hamlin, Hand, Hanson, Hughes, Hutchinson, Hyde, Jerauld, Kingsbury, Lake, Lincoln, Marshall, McCook, McPherson, Miner, Minnehaha, Moody, Potter, Roberts, Sanborn, Spink, Sully, Turner, Union, Walworth, and Yankton.
