= Bank of Bowdle =

- U.S. National Register of Historic Places
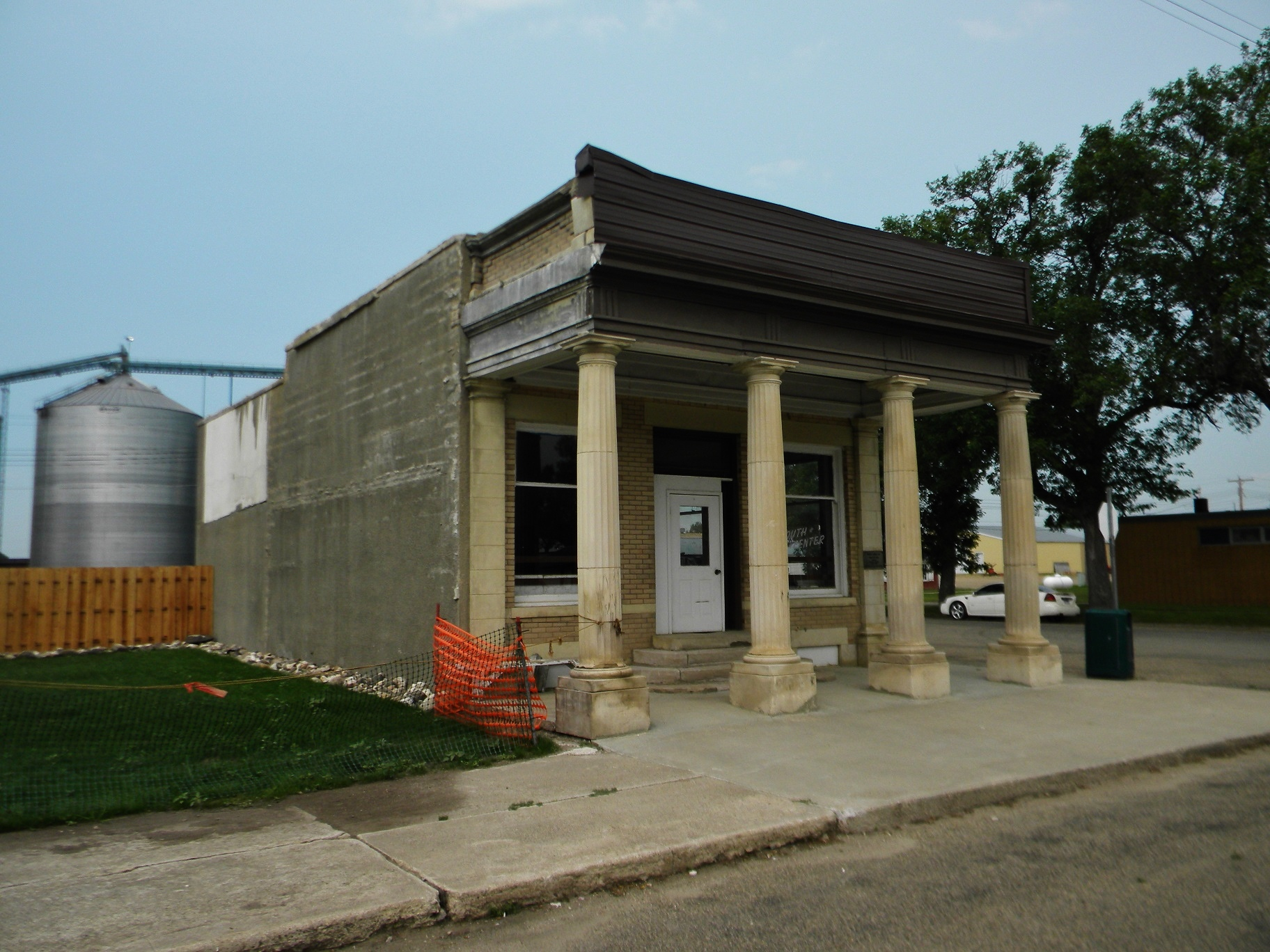
- Location: 3026 Main St., Bowdle, South Dakota
- Coordinates: 45°27′19″N 99°39′13″W
- Area: less than one acre
- Built: 1908
- NRHP reference No.: 85000183
- Added to NRHP: January 31, 1985

The Bank of Bowdle is a one-story cream-colored brick building with a portico supported by Doric columns, located at 3026 Main St., Bowdle, South Dakota. It was built in 1908, and was listed on the National Register of Historic Places in 1985.

It is significant as the first relatively-fireproof building built on Main Street, after a turn-of-the-20th-century fire. The Bowdle Pioneer asserted that the bank "'will be the prettiest building in the northwest part of the state," and, later that "'the interior finish is one of beauty and we doubt if its equal can be found in the state of South Dakota.'"

It later served as a bakery, then as a post office, and in 1985 it was in use as a youth center.
