= Andrew and Mary Stavig House =

Historic house in South Dakota, United States

- U.S. National Register of Historic Places
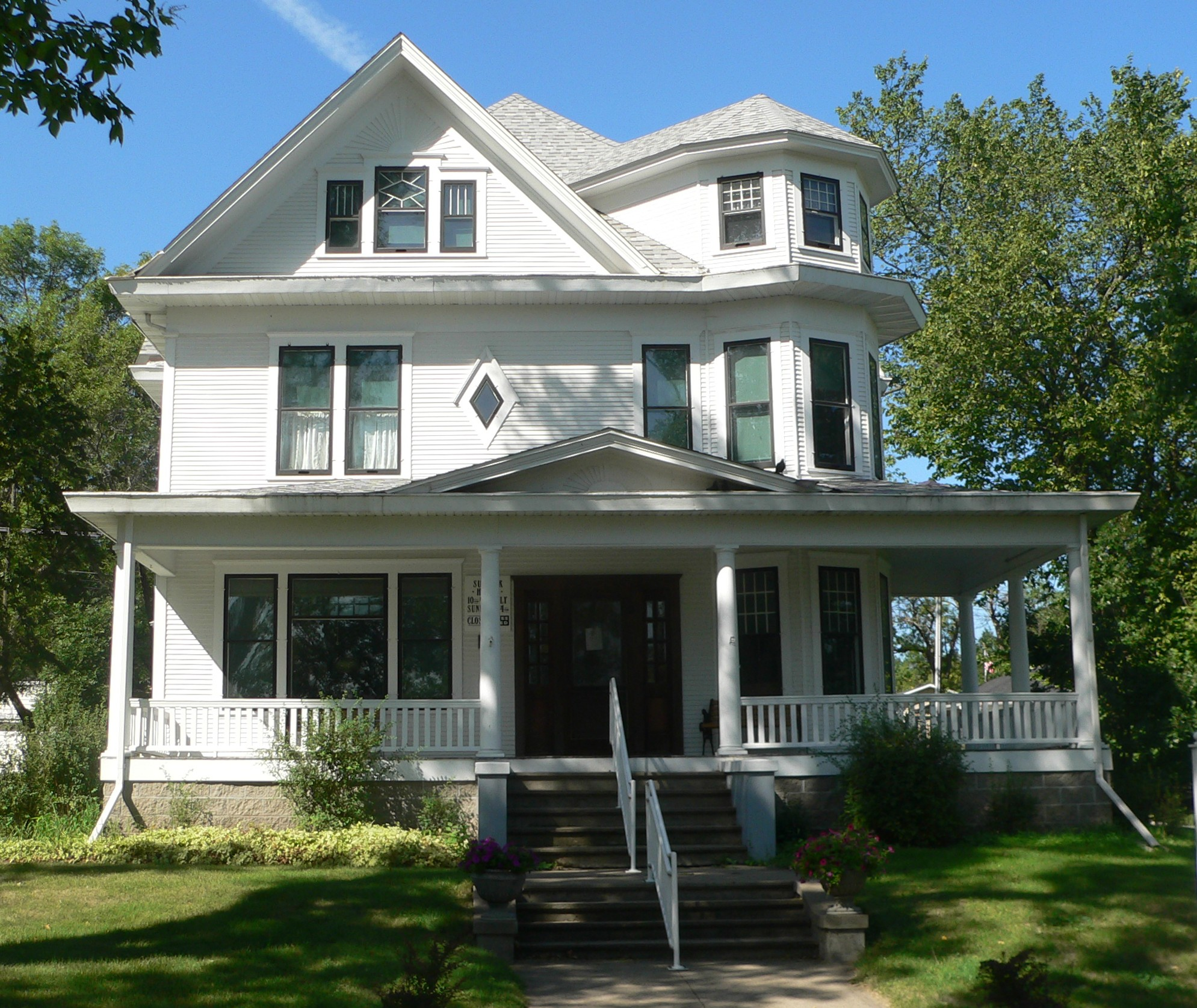

- Location within South Dakota Location within the United States
- Interactive map of Andrew and Mary Stavig House
- Location: 112 First Ave. W, Sisseton, South Dakota
- Coordinates: 45°39′41″N 97°03′09″W
- Area: less than one acre
- Built: 1916
- Built by: Arndt Rice and Hilman Rice
- Architectural style: Queen Anne
- NRHP reference No.: 97001392
- Added to NRHP: November 7, 1997

The Andrew and Mary Stavig House, located at 112 First Avenue, West, in Sisseton, South Dakota, is a Queen Anne-style house built in 1916. It was listed on the National Register of Historic Places in 1997, by which time it had become the Stavig House Museum.

It is a two-and-a-half-story house built by Scandinavian carpenters Arndt Rice and Hilman Rice.
