= 1881 Courthouse Museum =

Museum in South Dakota, USA

Coordinates: 43.76623°N 103.60153°W

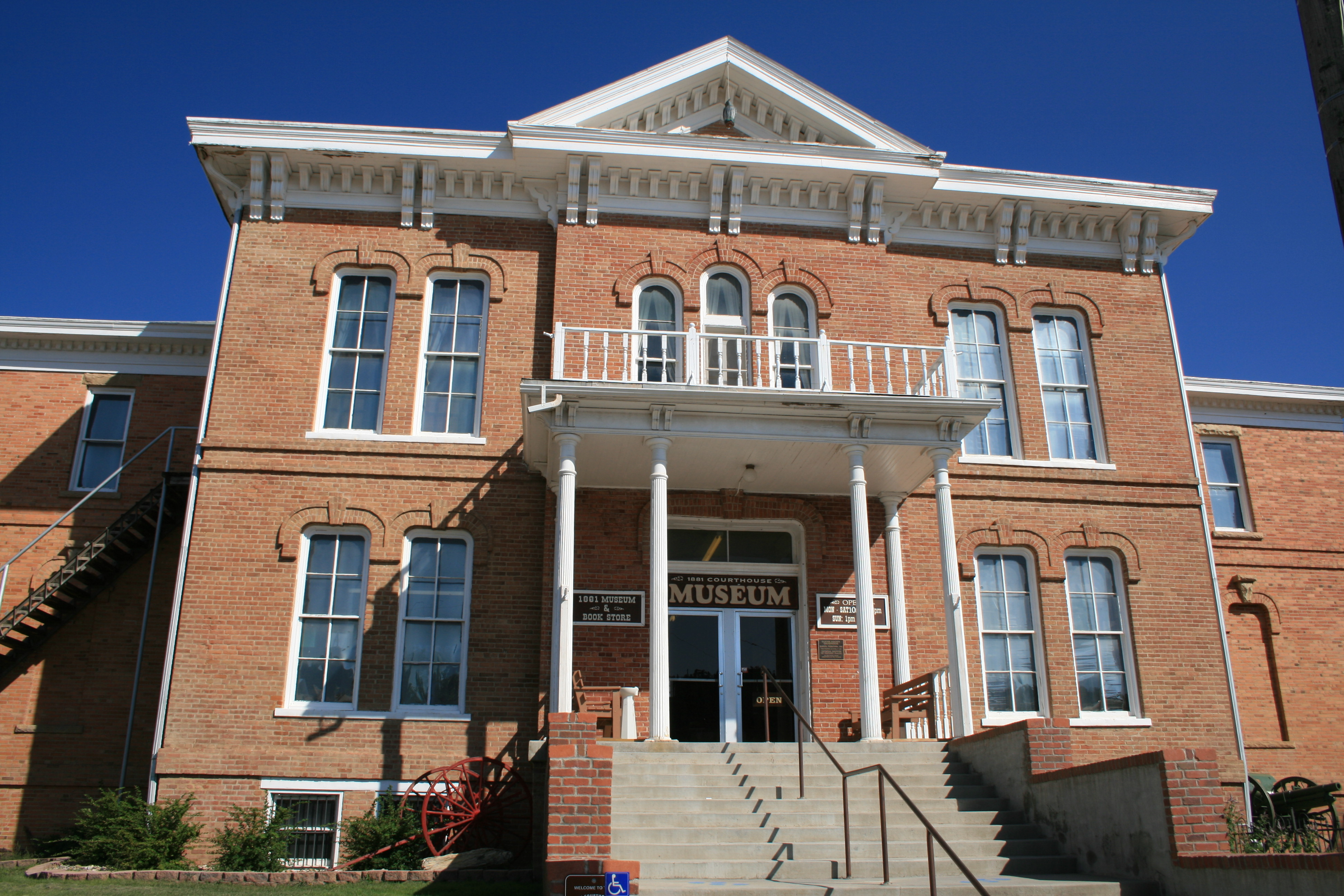
The Courthouse Museum from the front

The 1881 Courthouse Museum is an American historical museum located in Custer, South Dakota. The museum is housed in the original Custer County Courthouse which served as a center for government in Custer County and the Dakota Territory from 1881 to 1973. In November 1972, the 3-story red-brick courthouse was designated a historic site by the U.S Department of Interior. Following completion of a new courthouse located across the street, the original building was given to the Custer County Historical Society in 1973. The 1881 Custer County Courthouse museum was opened on September 6, 1976, by the Custer Country Historical Society. The museum houses exhibits about the Lakota Native American culture, the 1874 expedition of George Custer, and the lives of Victorian-era settlers in the Black Hills and Dakota Territory.
