= South Dakota State Historical Society =

Historical society of the U.S. state of South Dakota

Coordinates: 44°22′22.6″N 100°20′19.4″W

The South Dakota State Historical Society is South Dakota's official state historical society and operates statewide, and is headquartered in Pierre, South Dakota. It is a part of the South Dakota Department of Education.

== History ==
The South Dakota State Historical Society, after an initial meeting in April, was founded on May 7, 1862 as the Old Settlers Association of Dakota Territory. It was renamed the Historical Society of Dakota in 1863 and the South Dakota Historical Society in 1890, months after the state was admitted to the union. In 1901, the South Dakota Legislature took the Society into state government when it established the organization as an official arm of state government, the State Historical Society of South Dakota. About 1925, the name was changed to its present name, South Dakota State Historical Society. With each change of name, the property of the old Society was formally transferred to its successor.

Over the years, the Society was quartered in various places from the territorial post office in Yankton, the old territorial capitol, Pierre University, the temporary state capitol, and the current State Capitol. In 1932, the Society opened the new Soldiers and Sailors Memorial Building. In 1989, the Culture Heritage Center was opened as a home for all archives, a museum, and its administrative offices.

The initial directors were termed 'Secretary.' When the Society was reorganized in 1901, the directors were called 'Superintendent.' Since Dayton Canaday, the chief executive has been titled 'Director.' Directors were all volunteers until the third year of Doane Robinson's tenure. The title of 'State Historian' is independent of being Director. Recently many Directors have also been State Historian.

The Society's first programs were in the winter of 1862-1863. It still offers educational programs currently. One program, since 1901, has been the annual meeting. In 1980, the annual meeting expanded from a business and a keynote address to one with multiple topics in a single track with an organizing theme. In 2009, the annual meeting became today's State History Conference.

In the spring of 1863, the Society accepted its first library collection items. Around the turn of the 20th century, the state workers managed the Society's library and the State Library collections together. In 1975, the South Dakota State Archives were incorporated into the Society, which continues to operate them and also functions as a public research (non-lending) library. The Society had employed a librarian and manuscripts curator who were then included in the State Archives.

The first documented item came to the Society in 1882. Collections have been formally cataloged since 1904. American Indian, Military, and political ephemera characterize the collection. The Society began a formal museum to exhibit these artifacts in 1902 and has award-winning exhibits ever since.

In 1946, the Society began an archaeology program under Edythe L. George in response to the Flood Control Act of 1944. Sites along the river due to be flooded were surveyed. State Archaeology professionalized and created a State Board for Archaeology, a forerunner of the modern Archaeological Research Center of the South Dakota State Historical Society. ARC is headquartered in Rapid City.

Dayton Canaday began professionalizing staff in March 1968 with the hiring of museum curator Robert 'Bob' Gant. At Gant's suggestion, the Association of South Dakota Museums formed.

As a result of the 1972 state government reorganization, the South Dakota State Historic Preservation Office entered the Society. The National Historic Preservation Act of 1966 established offices in each state. Initially quartered in Vermillion, the office moved to Pierre in 1998. The office operates the Oahe Chapel and the Verendrye Site.

In 1997, the Society organized the South Dakota Historical Society Press as a collaboration of its Publications and Research Department and the South Dakota Historical Society Foundation. Members of the Society had first published beginning in 1870. The Society published member serials in 1936-1938 and 1947-1970, The modern South Dakota History journal began in December 1970.

In 2014, the South Dakota State Historical Society published an annotated version of Wilder's autobiography, titled Pioneer Girl: The Annotated Autobiography, by Laura Ingalls Wilder, Pamela Smith Hill (Editor).

In 2023, the Society broke ground on the renovation of its headquarters, the Cultural Heritage Center.

== Programs ==
- Archaeological Resource Center
- Museum of the South Dakota State Historical Society
- South Dakota State Historical Society Press
- State Archives
- State Historic Preservation Office

== Directors ==
- Benjamin F. Jones, Ph.D. (2020-
- Jay D. Vogt (2003-2020)
- Mary Beaty Edelen (1995-2003)
- Junius R. "J.R." Fishburne, Ph.D. (1987-1994)
- Frederick Wilferd Lillibridge, Ph.D. (1985-1987)
- Dayton Wayne Canaday, Sr. (1968-1984)
- Will Grow Robinson, LL.B. (1948-1968)
- Lawrence Keith Fox (1926-1946)
- Doane Robinson (1901-1925)
- William Maxwell Blackburn, LL.D. (1892-1898)
- George Harper Hand (1890-1891)
- George Washington Kingsbury (1870-1890)
- Moses Kimball Armstrong (1865-1870)
