= West River (South Dakota) =

Region of South Dakota, United States

Coordinates: 44.5°N 102°W

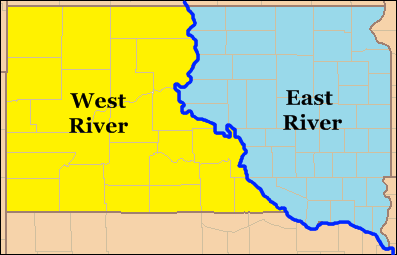
The Missouri River divides South Dakota into the regions of West River (yellow) and East River (blue).

West River is the portion of the state of South Dakota located west of the Missouri River; it contains more than one-half of the land area and between one-quarter and one-third of the population of the state.

The contrast between the two regions is striking. While East River is predominantly a corn- and wheat-growing region, with large numbers of pigs and poultry operations, West River is predominantly ranching with some dryland farming. Population has decreased as family farms declined due to the harsh conditions and industrialization of agriculture. Other than aggregates, all mining in South Dakota (including gold and other precious metals, industrial minerals, iron ore, and coal) is located in West River, which includes the Black Hills. Both areas were occupied for thousands of years by varying cultures of indigenous peoples. The Great Plains tribes, especially the Lakota or Sioux groups, held most of the territory west of the river. West River includes the Badlands, a vast expanse of rugged, unusable land designated a national park in 1939.

Badlands in Jackson County, South Dakota

Grassland near the Black Hills in Lawrence County, South Dakota

While European-American settlement of East River was largely by Yankee homesteaders moving west from Iowa, Minnesota, and Wisconsin or immigrants arriving by train from eastern United States seaports, those who went to West River were first gold-seekers and miners, many from older gold rush locations to the west, such as Montana and Colorado. They were followed by ranchers from Texas, Kansas, and Colorado. As a result, while East River has a high Scandinavian and German-descended population and a culture similar that of Minnesota and Iowa, the White majority population of West River is more ethnically diverse, with a culture similar to the Mountain states.

Nearly 10% of South Dakota's total population is Native American and Indian reservations are located in both sides of the state. Five are located west of the Missouri River, the area of the former Great Sioux Reservation established in 1868. More than 30% of the population of West River is of Native American descent; this includes primarily Lakota residents of the reservations, as well as populations in urban centers such as Rapid City.

Since the 1960s and the rise of Indian activism, numerous Native Americans have returned to the reservations. Native Americans make up the fastest-growing segment of the population in the state as a whole. In the 1990s, Bennett County's population became majority Native American. From 2000 to 2010, the total Native American population in the state grew by 15 percent.

Since the late 20th century, Native Americans have become more engaged in local, state and federal politics. Native Americans across the state overwhelmingly support the Democratic Party. In the 2002 elections, Oglala Lakota candidates won elections in Bennett County for county sheriff, one of the county commissioners, and a seat on the county school board.

As of 2010, nearly 97 percent of West River's population was white or Native American, with less than four percent being African American, Asian, or Hispanic. Containing both Ellsworth Air Force Base and most installations of the South Dakota Army National Guard, West River has major military activities contributing to the regional economy. Only the South Dakota Air National Guard is located in East River (at Joe Foss Field in Sioux Falls).

The majority-White voters of West River are politically more conservative and Republican than East River.

The state Republican Party is normally dominated by East River interests. Walter Dale Miller, the first governor from West River in the state's recent history, came to office in 1993 following the death of Governor George S. Mickelson. Larry Rhoden is the second governor from West River, and came to office following Kristi Noem's departure in 2025.
