= Edmunds County, South Dakota =

County in South Dakota, United States

- County
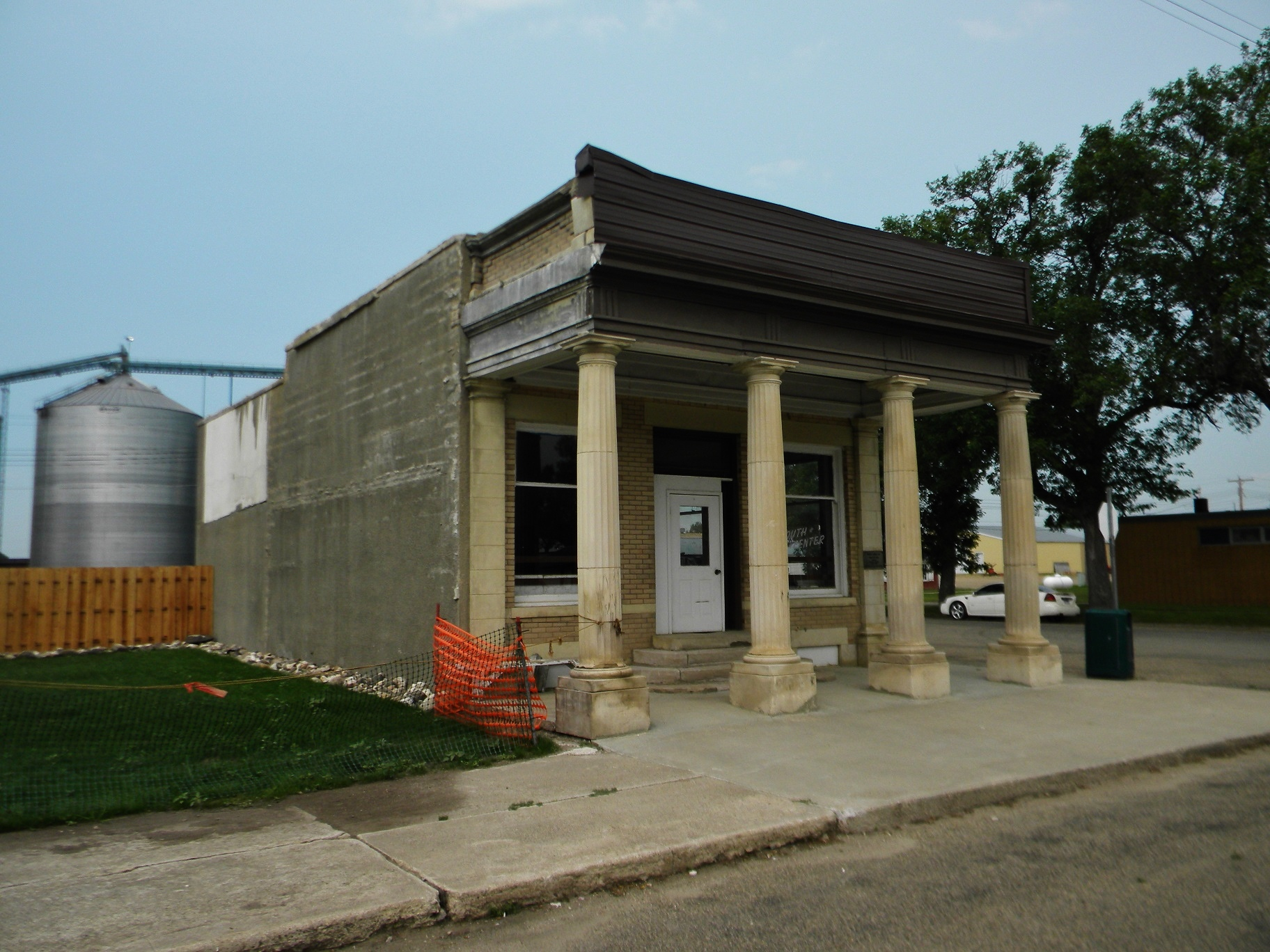
- Historic Bank of Bowdle

- Location within the U.S. state of South Dakota
- Coordinates: 45°25′N 99°13′W
- Country: United States
- State: South Dakota
- Founded: 1873
- Organized: 1883
- Named for: Newton Edmunds
- Seat: Ipswich
- Largest city: Ipswich

Area
  - Total: 1,151 sq mi (2,980 km^{2})
  - Land: 1,126 sq mi (2,920 km^{2})
  - Water: 25 sq mi (65 km^{2}) 2.2%

Population (2020)
  - Total: 3,986
  - Estimate (2025): 4,022 ▲
  - Density: 3.6/sq mi (1.4/km^{2})
- Time zone: UTC−6 (Central)
  - Summer (DST): UTC−5 (CDT)
- Congressional district: At-large
- Website: edmunds.sdcounties.org

Edmunds County is a county in the U.S. state of South Dakota. At the 2020 census, the population was 3,986. Its county seat is Ipswich. The county was established in 1873 and organized in 1883. It is named for Newton Edmunds, the second Governor of Dakota Territory.

Edmunds County is part of the Aberdeen, SD Micropolitan Statistical Area.

== Geography ==
The terrain of Edmunds County consists of rolling hills, mostly dedicated to agriculture. The terrain's highest point is on the west portion of the north boundary line, at 1,978 ft (603 m) ASL. The county has a total area of 1,151 square miles (2,980 km^{2}), of which 1,126 square miles (2,920 km^{2}) is land and 25 square miles (65 km^{2}) (2.2%) is water.

=== Major highways ===
- U.S. Highway 12
- South Dakota Highway 45
- South Dakota Highway 47
- South Dakota Highway 247
- South Dakota Highway 253

=== Adjacent counties ===
- McPherson County – north
- Brown County – east
- Faulk County – south
- Potter County – southwest
- Walworth County – west

=== Protected areas ===
- Bowdle-Hosmer State Game Production Area
- Heilman State Game Production Area
- Hosmer State Game Production Area
- Light State Game Production Area
- Losee State Game Production Area
- Mina Lake State Recreation Area
- Mina State Game Production Area
- North Scatterwood State Game Production Area
- Rosette State Game Production Area
- Schaber State Game Production Area
- Shaner State Game Production Area
- Steigelmier State Game Production Area

=== Lakes ===
- Alkali Lake
- Bowdle-Hosmer Lake
- Grass Lake
- Lake Parmley
- North Scatterwood Lake (partial)

== Demographics ==
Historical population
Census	Pop.	Note	%±
1890	4,399		—
1900	4,916		11.8%
1910	7,654		55.7%
1920	8,336		8.9%
1930	8,712		4.5%
1940	7,814		−10.3%
1950	7,275		−6.9%
1960	6,079		−16.4%
1970	5,548		−8.7%
1980	5,159		−7.0%
1990	4,356		−15.6%
2000	4,367		0.3%
2010	4,071		−6.8%
2020	3,986		−2.1%
2025 (est.)	4,022	▲	0.9%
U.S. Decennial Census:

=== 2020 census ===
As of the 2020 census, the county had a population of 3,986 and 1,052 families residing in the county. Of the residents, 22.9% were under the age of 18 and 23.0% were 65 years of age or older; the median age was 44.7 years. For every 100 females there were 104.5 males, and for every 100 females age 18 and over there were 104.3 males.

The population density was 3.5 inhabitants per square mile (1.4/km^{2}). There were 1,940 housing units, of which 20.3% were vacant. Among occupied housing units, 78.3% were owner-occupied and 21.7% were renter-occupied. The homeowner vacancy rate was 1.4% and the rental vacancy rate was 13.2%.

The racial makeup of the county was 95.4% White, 0.3% Black or African American, 1.0% American Indian and Alaska Native, 0.6% Asian, 0.6% from some other race, and 2.1% from two or more races. Hispanic or Latino residents of any race comprised 1.5% of the population.

There were 1,546 households in the county, of which 25.0% had children under the age of 18 living with them and 17.7% had a female householder with no spouse or partner present. About 28.1% of all households were made up of individuals and 13.3% had someone living alone who was 65 years of age or older.

=== 2010 census ===
As of the 2010 census, there were 4,071 people, 1,607 households and 1,057 families residing in the county. The population density was 3.6 per square mile (1.4/km^{2}). There were 1,966 housing units at an average density of 1.7 per square mile (0.66/km^{2}). The racial make-up of the county was 97.8% white, 0.4% American Indian, 0.1% black or African American, 0.1% Asian, 0.5% from other races, and 1.0% from two or more races. Those of Hispanic or Latino origin made up 1.4% of the population. In terms of ancestry, 70.8% were German, 11.4% were Norwegian, 10.1% were Russian, 5.9% were English and 2.4% were American.

Of the 1,607 households, 26.4% had children under the age of 18 living with them, 58.9% were married couples living together, 4.0% had a female householder with no husband present, 34.2% were non-families, and 31.0% of all households were made up of individuals. The average household size was 2.27 and the average family size was 2.84. The median age was 45.7 years.

The median household income was $47,026 and the median family income was $56,599. Males had a median income of $37,713 and females $26,287. The per capita income was $24,268. About 6.9% of families and 11.6% of the population were below the poverty line, including 11.0% of those under age 18 and 13.6% of those age 65 or over.

== Notable events ==
Edmunds County is where the Learjet of the PGA golfer Payne Stewart crashed, killing him and five others on board. The plane crashed just south of the community of Mina at the approximate coordinates of 45°25' N 98°45' W.

== Communities ==
=== Cities ===
- Bowdle
- Hosmer
- Ipswich (county seat)
- Roscoe

=== Census-designated places ===
- Deerfield Colony
- Mina
- Pembrook Colony
- Plainview Colony

=== Unincorporated communities ===
- Beebe
- Craven
- Gretna
- Loyalton
- Powell

=== Townships ===
- Adrian
- Belle
- Bowdle
- Bryant
- Clear Lake
- Cleveland
- Cloyd
- Cordlandt
- Cottonwood Lake
- Fountain
- Glen
- Glover
- Harmony
- Hillside
- Hosmer
- Hudson
- Huntley
- Ipswich
- Kent
- Liberty
- Madison
- Modena
- Montpelier
- North Bryant
- Odessa
- Pembrook
- Powell
- Richland
- Rosette
- Sangamon
- Union
- Vermont

== Politics ==
Edmunds County voters have long been reliably Republican. Since 1936, in only three elections has the county selected the Democratic Party candidate. Although it was one of only 129 counties nationwide to back George McGovern in his landslide 1972 defeat, it has voted for fewer Democratic presidential nominees (six) than any other county McGovern carried, with Jimmy Carter in 1976 the last Democrat to carry the county and Kamala Harris not passing twenty percent in 2024.

United States presidential election results for Edmunds County, South Dakota
Year	Republican		Democratic		Third party(ies)	
Year	No.	%	No.	%	No.	%
1892	386	44.22%	156	17.87%	331	37.92%
1896	371	41.78%	510	57.43%	7	0.79%
1900	621	51.97%	553	46.28%	21	1.76%
1904	786	65.88%	353	29.59%	54	4.53%
1908	726	50.14%	658	45.44%	64	4.42%
1912	0	0.00%	729	49.12%	755	50.88%
1916	894	55.46%	634	39.33%	84	5.21%
1920	1,486	60.36%	283	11.49%	693	28.15%
1924	1,043	42.38%	277	11.26%	1,141	46.36%
1928	1,743	51.95%	1,597	47.60%	15	0.45%
1932	1,183	30.84%	2,588	67.47%	65	1.69%
1936	1,818	46.76%	2,030	52.21%	40	1.03%
1940	2,341	61.87%	1,443	38.13%	0	0.00%
1944	1,762	64.71%	961	35.29%	0	0.00%
1948	1,493	54.00%	1,253	45.32%	19	0.69%
1952	2,178	68.25%	1,013	31.75%	0	0.00%
1956	1,685	51.61%	1,580	48.39%	0	0.00%
1960	1,728	51.78%	1,609	48.22%	0	0.00%
1964	1,442	45.78%	1,708	54.22%	0	0.00%
1968	1,534	52.18%	1,225	41.67%	181	6.16%
1972	1,567	48.73%	1,646	51.18%	3	0.09%
1976	1,294	44.13%	1,629	55.56%	9	0.31%
1980	1,881	64.55%	883	30.30%	150	5.15%
1984	1,553	60.43%	1,007	39.18%	10	0.39%
1988	1,327	51.06%	1,259	48.44%	13	0.50%
1992	944	41.77%	894	39.56%	422	18.67%
1996	1,055	45.67%	973	42.12%	282	12.21%
2000	1,257	63.29%	676	34.04%	53	2.67%
2004	1,434	64.19%	765	34.24%	35	1.57%
2008	1,213	58.43%	819	39.45%	44	2.12%
2012	1,264	65.29%	622	32.13%	50	2.58%
2016	1,433	74.71%	380	19.81%	105	5.47%
2020	1,538	77.48%	417	21.01%	30	1.51%
2024	1,618	79.67%	384	18.91%	29	1.43%

== Education ==
School districts include:

- Bowdle School District 22-1
- Faulkton School District 24-4
- Edmunds Central School District 22-5
- Hoven School District 53-2
- Ipswich School District 22-6
- Northwestern Area School District 56-7
- Warner School District 06-5

== See also ==
- National Register of Historic Places listings in Edmunds County, South Dakota
