= Ipswich, South Dakota =

Ipswich Ipsíča (Lakota)
- City
- Location in Edmunds County and the state of South Dakota
- Coordinates: 45°26′36″N 99°01′48″W
- Country: United States
- State: South Dakota
- County: Edmunds
- Settled: 1883

Area
  - Total: 1.34 sq mi (3.47 km^{2})
  - Land: 1.34 sq mi (3.47 km^{2})
  - Water: 0 sq mi (0.00 km^{2})
- Elevation: 1,536 ft (468 m)

Population (2020)
  - Total: 928
  - Density: 692/sq mi (267.3/km^{2})
- Time zone: UTC-6 (Central (CST))
  - Summer (DST): UTC-5 (CDT)
- ZIP code: 57451
- Area code: 605
- FIPS code: 46-31860
- GNIS feature ID: 1267436
- Website: ipswich-sd.com

Ipswich is a city in and county seat of Edmunds County, South Dakota, United States. The population was 928 at the 2020 census.

== History ==
Bank of Ipswich, Main Street, Ipswich, 1987

Ipswich was founded in 1883 as a stop on the Chicago, Milwaukee, St. Paul and Pacific Railroad. It was named by Charles H. Prior after either Ipswich, in England, or Ipswich, Massachusetts.

Preachers Run, a tributary of the James River, runs through Ipswich.

== Geography ==
According to the United States Census Bureau, the city has a total area of 1.34 square miles (3.47 km^{2}), all of it land.

=== Climate ===
Climate data for Ipswich, South Dakota (1991−2020 normals, extremes 1897−present)
Month	Jan	Feb	Mar	Apr	May	Jun	Jul	Aug	Sep	Oct	Nov	Dec	Year
Record high °F (°C)	65 (18)	68 (20)	85 (29)	97 (36)	107 (42)	113 (45)	115 (46)	117 (47)	106 (41)	95 (35)	77 (25)	68 (20)	117 (47)
Mean daily maximum °F (°C)	23.5 (−4.7)	28.3 (−2.1)	41.2 (5.1)	56.5 (13.6)	69.0 (20.6)	78.5 (25.8)	83.7 (28.7)	81.8 (27.7)	73.5 (23.1)	58.4 (14.7)	41.9 (5.5)	28.3 (−2.1)	55.4 (13.0)
Daily mean °F (°C)	13.3 (−10.4)	17.6 (−8.0)	30.0 (−1.1)	43.8 (6.6)	56.3 (13.5)	66.6 (19.2)	71.6 (22.0)	69.2 (20.7)	60.2 (15.7)	46.0 (7.8)	30.8 (−0.7)	18.6 (−7.4)	43.7 (6.5)
Mean daily minimum °F (°C)	3.0 (−16.1)	6.9 (−13.9)	18.9 (−7.3)	31.0 (−0.6)	43.6 (6.4)	54.7 (12.6)	59.4 (15.2)	56.6 (13.7)	47.0 (8.3)	33.6 (0.9)	19.7 (−6.8)	8.8 (−12.9)	31.9 (−0.1)
Record low °F (°C)	−45 (−43)	−38 (−39)	−25 (−32)	−8 (−22)	17 (−8)	27 (−3)	35 (2)	30 (−1)	13 (−11)	−12 (−24)	−27 (−33)	−40 (−40)	−45 (−43)
Average precipitation inches (mm)	0.35 (8.9)	0.54 (14)	0.85 (22)	1.79 (45)	2.99 (76)	3.48 (88)	3.13 (80)	2.40 (61)	1.94 (49)	1.67 (42)	0.54 (14)	0.48 (12)	20.16 (512)
Average snowfall inches (cm)	6.0 (15)	6.8 (17)	5.4 (14)	4.0 (10)	0.0 (0.0)	0.0 (0.0)	0.0 (0.0)	0.0 (0.0)	0.0 (0.0)	1.1 (2.8)	4.7 (12)	5.7 (14)	33.7 (86)
Average precipitation days (≥ 0.01 in)	4.2	4.0	4.6	5.5	8.0	8.6	7.1	5.6	5.2	4.6	3.2	3.7	64.3
Average snowy days (≥ 0.1 in)	3.9	3.5	2.6	1.1	0.0	0.0	0.0	0.0	0.0	0.4	2.0	3.4	16.9
Source: NOAA

== Demographics ==
Historical population
Census	Pop.	Note	%±
1890	539		—
1900	397		−26.3%
1910	810		104.0%
1920	909		12.2%
1930	913		0.4%
1940	1,002		9.7%
1950	1,058		5.6%
1960	1,131		6.9%
1970	1,187		5.0%
1980	1,153		−2.9%
1990	965		−16.3%
2000	943		−2.3%
2010	954		1.2%
2020	928		−2.7%
U.S. Decennial Census

=== 2020 census ===
As of the 2020 census, Ipswich had a population of 928. The median age was 42.8 years, with 24.8% of residents under the age of 18 and 24.6% of residents aged 65 or older.

For every 100 females there were 101.3 males, and for every 100 females age 18 and over there were 99.4 males age 18 and over.

0.0% of residents lived in urban areas, while 100.0% lived in rural areas.

There were 382 households in Ipswich, of which 26.2% had children under the age of 18 living in them. Of all households, 53.1% were married-couple households, 19.1% were households with a male householder and no spouse or partner present, and 22.8% were households with a female householder and no spouse or partner present. About 33.5% of all households were made up of individuals and 17.3% had someone living alone who was 65 years of age or older. There were 435 housing units, of which 12.2% were vacant. The homeowner vacancy rate was 1.4% and the rental vacancy rate was 15.3%.

Racial composition as of the 2020 census
Race	Number	Percent
White	880	94.8%
Black or African American	2	0.2%
American Indian and Alaska Native	7	0.8%
Asian	6	0.6%
Native Hawaiian and Other Pacific Islander	0	0.0%
Some other race	13	1.4%
Two or more races	20	2.2%
Hispanic or Latino (of any race)	21	2.3%

=== 2010 census ===
As of the census of 2010, there were 954 people, 402 households, and 249 families living in the city. The population density was 711.9 inhabitants per square mile (274.9/km^{2}). There were 441 housing units at an average density of 329.1 per square mile (127.1/km^{2}). The racial makeup of the city was 97.5% White, 0.1% African American, 0.9% Native American, 0.1% Asian, and 1.4% from two or more races. Hispanic or Latino of any race were 0.7% of the population.

There were 402 households, of which 29.6% had children under the age of 18 living with them, 51.7% were married couples living together, 7.5% had a female householder with no husband present, 2.7% had a male householder with no wife present, and 38.1% were non-families. 35.6% of all households were made up of individuals, and 17.9% had someone living alone who was 65 years of age or older. The average household size was 2.24 and the average family size was 2.91.

The median age in the city was 45.1 years. 23.3% of residents were under the age of 18; 6.3% were between the ages of 18 and 24; 20.3% were from 25 to 44; 27.3% were from 45 to 64; and 22.7% were 65 years of age or older. The gender makeup of the city was 49.8% male and 50.2% female.

=== 2000 census ===
As of the census of 2000, there were 943 people, 404 households, and 254 families living in the city. The population density was 719.3 inhabitants per square mile (277.7/km^{2}). There were 440 housing units at an average density of 335.6 per square mile (129.6/km^{2}). The racial makeup of the city was 98.52% White, 0.21% African American, 0.42% Native American, 0.11% Asian, 0.11% Pacific Islander, 0.21% from other races, and 0.42% from two or more races. Hispanic or Latino of any race were 0.64% of the population.

There were 404 households, out of which 29.7% had children under the age of 18 living with them, 54.0% were married couples living together, 7.7% had a female householder with no husband present, and 37.1% were non-families. 34.2% of all households were made up of individuals, and 20.8% had someone living alone who was 65 years of age or older. The average household size was 2.32 and the average family size was 3.01.

In the city, the population was spread out, with 27.4% under the age of 18, 5.3% from 18 to 24, 23.4% from 25 to 44, 19.3% from 45 to 64, and 24.6% who were 65 years of age or older. The median age was 41 years. For every 100 females, there were 92.1 males. For every 100 females age 18 and over, there were 84.1 males.

The median income for a household in the city was $33,073, and the median income for a family was $40,598. Males had a median income of $30,268 versus $16,413 for females. The per capita income for the city was $19,890. About 6.7% of families and 8.7% of the population were below the poverty line, including 6.2% of those under age 18 and 19.2% of those age 65 or over.

== Notable people ==
- Everett Hughes, United States military officer
- J.W. Parmley, South Dakota lawyer, legislator, and businessman
- Gene Wockenfuss, former athletic director and head football coach of the Dakota State Trojans

== See also ==
- List of cities in South Dakota
