= National Register of Historic Places listings in Brown County, South Dakota =

Location of Brown County in South Dakota

This is a list of the National Register of Historic Places listings in Brown County, South Dakota.

This is intended to be a complete list of the properties and districts on the National Register of Historic Places in Brown County, South Dakota, United States. The locations of National Register properties and districts for which the latitude and longitude coordinates are included below, may be seen in a map.

There are 46 properties and districts listed on the National Register in the county. Another property was once listed but has since been removed

This National Park Service list is complete through NPS recent listings posted May 1, 2026.

== Current listings ==
	Name on the Register	Image	Date listed	Location	City or town	Description
1	Aberdeen Commercial Historic District	Aberdeen Commercial Historic District	May 23, 1988 (#88000586)	1-523 South Main Street; 45°27′44″N 98°29′16″W	Aberdeen	
2	Aberdeen Highlands Historic District	Aberdeen Highlands Historic District	June 5, 1975 (#75001710)	Both sides of North Main from 12th to 15th Avenue, N.E. 45°28′46″N 98°29′15″W	Aberdeen	
3	Aberdeen Historic District	Aberdeen Historic District	June 5, 1975 (#75001711)	Both sides of 3rd-6th Avenues and Jay, Kline, and Arch Streets; 45°27′38″N 98°28′55″W	Aberdeen	
4	Augustana Swedish Lutheran Church	Augustana Swedish Lutheran Church	December 20, 1988 (#88002842)	4.5 miles south of Claremont; 45°36′04″N 98°00′02″W	Claremont	
5	Aurland United Norwegian Lutheran Church	Aurland United Norwegian Lutheran Church	April 16, 1982 (#82003916)	Southeast of Frederick; 45°46′14″N 98°24′55″W	Frederick	
6	William G. Bickelhaupt House	William G. Bickelhaupt House	October 19, 1989 (#89001727)	1003 South Jay; 45°27′16″N 98°29′00″W	Aberdeen	
7	William C. Blanchard House	William C. Blanchard House	August 12, 2022 (#100008006)	1016 South Kline St. 45°27′15″N 98°28′56″W	Aberdeen	
8	Brown County Courthouse	Brown County Courthouse	June 3, 1976 (#76001718)	First Avenue; 45°27′52″N 98°29′10″W	Aberdeen	
9	Brown Hall	Brown Hall	February 7, 1990 (#89002336)	Main Street; 45°43′55″N 98°29′50″W	Barnard	
10	Brown's Post		May 27, 1988 (#88000583)	Address restricted	Sisseton	
11	Colin Campbell Post		May 27, 1988 (#88000584)	Address restricted	Frederick	
12	Chicago, Milwaukee, St. Paul and Pacific Railroad Depot	Chicago, Milwaukee, St. Paul and Pacific Railroad Depot	September 20, 1977 (#77001238)	Main Street and Railroad Avenue; 45°27′56″N 98°29′20″W	Aberdeen	
13	Dakota Farmer Building	Dakota Farmer Building	August 1, 1984 (#84003221)	1216 South Main Street; 45°27′07″N 98°29′19″W	Aberdeen	
14	Easton's Castle	Easton's Castle	March 1, 1973 (#73001736)	1210 Second Avenue, N.W. 45°28′07″N 98°30′15″W	Aberdeen	
15	Finnish Apostolic Lutheran Church	Finnish Apostolic Lutheran Church	May 31, 1984 (#84003223)	101 Street and 392 Avenue; 45°55′24″N 98°23′38″W	Frederick	
16	John H. Firey House	John H. Firey House	March 23, 1995 (#95000277)	418 South Arch Street; 45°27′38″N 98°28′52″W	Aberdeen	
17	First Presbyterian Church of Groton	First Presbyterian Church of Groton	March 14, 2019 (#100003447)	300 N. Main St. 45°26′56″N 98°05′55″W	Groton	
18	First United Methodist Church	First United Methodist Church	May 28, 1976 (#76001719)	S. Lincoln St. and SE. 5th Ave. 45°27′36″N 98°29′12″W	Aberdeen	
19	Foght-Murdy House	Foght-Murdy House	March 23, 1995 (#95000276)	1403 S. Main St. 45°27′18″N 98°29′17″W	Aberdeen	
20	Paul and Fredriika Geranen Farm		November 13, 1985 (#85003498)	East of Frederick; 45°51′00″N 98°24′48″W	Frederick	
21	Great Northern Railway Passenger and Freight Depot	Great Northern Railway Passenger and Freight Depot	January 27, 1983 (#83003002)	1 Court St. 45°27′54″N 98°29′07″W	Aberdeen	
22	Anna Herron Farm		June 30, 1995 (#95000778)	1.5 miles east of Highway 18 on County Highway 21 near Groton; 45°23′11″N 98°11′47″W	West Hanson Township	No longer extant per aerial view.
23	Art Karl Farm		July 7, 1995 (#95000777)	Southeastern corner of the junction of Highways 14 and 21 near Aberdeen; 45°23′10″N 98°24′41″W	West Gem Township	
24	Margaret and Maurice Lamont House	Margaret and Maurice Lamont House	March 23, 1995 (#95000281)	515 S. Arch St. 45°27′34″N 98°28′50″W	Aberdeen	
25	Martilla-Pettingel and Gorder General Merchandise Store	Martilla-Pettingel and Gorder General Merchandise Store	November 13, 1985 (#85003490)	312 Main St. 45°49′57″N 98°30′21″W	Frederick	
26	Masonic Temple	Masonic Temple	May 29, 1980 (#80003719)	503 S. Main St. 45°27′35″N 98°29′15″W	Aberdeen	
27	McGregor House	McGregor House	June 8, 2005 (#05000591)	621 S. Kline St. 45°27′30″N 98°28′55″W	Aberdeen	
28	McKenzie-Cassels House	McKenzie-Cassels House	February 13, 1986 (#86000242)	508 N. 3rd St. 45°27′04″N 98°05′49″W	Groton	
29	Minneapolis and St. Louis Railroad Depot	Minneapolis and St. Louis Railroad Depot	September 28, 1976 (#76001720)	1100 S. Main St. 45°27′14″N 98°29′17″W	Aberdeen	
30	Modern Woodmen of America Hall		July 7, 1995 (#95000775)	Northwestern corner of the junction of Main and 2nd Sts. 45°14′35″N 98°33′46″W	Mansfield	
31	George Pfutzenreuter House	George Pfutzenreuter House	June 21, 1990 (#90000955)	411 3rd St. 45°52′54″N 98°09′09″W	Hecla	
32	Plana School	Plana School	July 7, 1995 (#95000773)	7 miles north of Highway 12 and 1 mile east of County Highway 16; 45°31′04″N 98°18′34″W	Plana	
33	Melchior Ryman Farm		June 30, 1995 (#95000771)	2 miles west of Highway 281, 3 miles north of Mansfield; 45°17′13″N 98°33′30″W	Mansfield	
34	Savo Hall-Finnish National Society Hall	Savo Hall-Finnish National Society Hall	November 13, 1985 (#85003494)	104 St and 391 Ave; 45°52′47″N 98°24′51″W	Savo Township	
35	Simmons House	Simmons House	August 1, 1984 (#84003224)	1408 S. Main St. 45°27′01″N 98°29′19″W	Aberdeen	
36	South Dakota Dept. of Transportation Bridge No. 07-009-060		March 9, 2000 (#00000185)	Local road over Elm Dam Spillway; 45°51′07″N 98°42′22″W	Frederick	
37	South Dakota Dept. of Transportation Bridge No. 07-220-454		March 9, 2000 (#00000184)	Local road over Mud Creek; 45°16′13″N 98°17′16″W	Stratford	
38	South Dakota Dept. of Transportation Bridge No. 07-268-030	South Dakota Dept. of Transportation Bridge No. 07-268-030	March 9, 2000 (#00000186)	Local road over the James River; 45°53′35″N 98°10′33″W	Hecla	
39	South Dakota Dept. of Transportation Bridge No. 07-304-414		March 9, 2000 (#00000187)	Local road over Ferney Ravine; 45°20′19″N 98°05′43″W	Ferney	
40	Trinity Episcopal Church	Trinity Episcopal Church	January 27, 1983 (#83003003)	Third Avenue East and Third Street North; 45°26′55″N 98°05′54″W	Groton	
41	US Post Office and Courthouse-Aberdeen	US Post Office and Courthouse-Aberdeen	October 4, 2006 (#06000931)	102 Forth Avenue, S.E. 45°27′39″N 98°29′09″W	Aberdeen	
42	Alonzo Ward Hotel	Alonzo Ward Hotel	June 17, 1982 (#82003915)	104 South Main Street; 45°27′50″N 98°29′17″W	Aberdeen	
43	Welsh Presbyterian Church		July 6, 1995 (#95000776)	7 miles north of Highway 12 and 1 mile east of Highway 16; 45°31′08″N 98°18′39″W	Plana	
44	Gustav and Mary Werth House	Gustav and Mary Werth House	June 28, 1991 (#91000846)	1502 North Dakota Street; 45°28′52″N 98°28′27″W	Aberdeen	
45	Western Union Building	Western Union Building	December 12, 1976 (#76001721)	21-23 South Main Street; 45°27′52″N 98°29′15″W	Aberdeen	
46	Wylie Park Pavilion	Wylie Park Pavilion	January 26, 1978 (#78002540)	North of Aberdeen off U.S. Route 281; 45°29′22″N 98°31′00″W	Aberdeen	

== Former listing ==
	Name on the Register	Image	Date listed	Date removed	Location	City or town	Description
1	South Dakota Dept. of Transportation Bridge No. 07-091-330		March 9, 2000 (#00000183)	March 26, 2008	US 12 over State of South Dakota RR tracks	Aberdeen vicinity	Replaced in 2005

== See also ==
- List of National Historic Landmarks in South Dakota
- National Register of Historic Places listings in South Dakota
