= Savo =

Savo may refer to:

== Languages ==
- Savo dialect, forms of the Finnish language spoken in Savo, Finland
- Savosavo language, an endangered language spoken on Savo Island in the Solomon Islands

== People ==
- Savo (given name), a masculine given name from southern Europe (includes a list of people with the name)
- Savo, nickname of Steven Milne (born 1980), Scottish professional footballer
- Savo Finns, subgroup of Finnish people

== Places ==
=== Finland ===
- Savo (historical province), Finland
- North Savo (Finnish: Pohjois-Savo), Finland
- South Savo (Finnish: Etelä-Savo), Finland

=== Solomon Islands ===
- Savo Island, off Guadalcanal in the Solomon Islands
  - Battle of Savo Island (disambiguation), a number of World War II battles
  - USS Savo Island, a U.S. Navy escort carrier named in memory of the battle

=== United States ===
- Savo Township, South Dakota, a township in Brown County

== Other uses ==
- 1494 Savo, an asteroid in the main-belt
- Ki Savo, part of the annual Jewish cycle of Torah reading
- Savo Hall or Finnish National Society Hall, a historic meeting hall in Savo Township, Brown County, South Dakota, United States

== See also ==
- Savonia (disambiguation)
- Savoy (disambiguation)
