= McGregor House =

McGregor House may refer to the following places:

- McGregor House (Tulsa, Oklahoma), listed on the National Register of Historic Places
- McGregor House (Aberdeen, South Dakota), listed on the National Register of Historic Places
