= Paul and Fredriika Geranen Farm =

- U.S. National Register of Historic Places
- Location within South Dakota Location within the United States
- Nearest city: Frederick, South Dakota
- Coordinates: 45°51′0″N 98°24′48″W
- Area: 5 acres (2.0 ha)
- Built by: Paul Geranen, Fred Geranen
- MPS: Architecture of Finnish Settlement TR
- NRHP reference No.: 85003498
- Added to NRHP: November 13, 1985

The Paul and Fredriika Geranen Farm is a historic farm located east of Frederick, South Dakota. The farm's seventeen buildings include two houses, a barn, and a Finnish sauna. The farm was settled by Paul and Fredriika Geranen, a Finnish immigrant couple who moved to the land in 1893. In addition to farming, Paul ran a store in Savo. After the couple moved to Bryant, their son Fred rented the farm; Fred rebuilt the farm's sauna and added the second house.

The farm was added to the National Register of Historic Places in 1985.
