= Dacotah =

Dacotah may refer to:

- USS Dacotah, United States Navy gunboat
- Dacotah Bank Stadium, Aberdeen, South Dakota
- Dacotah Field, Fargo, North Dakota
- Dacotah Prairie Museum, Aberdeen, South Dakota
