= Alonzo Ward Hotel =

- U.S. National Register of Historic Places
- U.S. Historic district – Contributing property
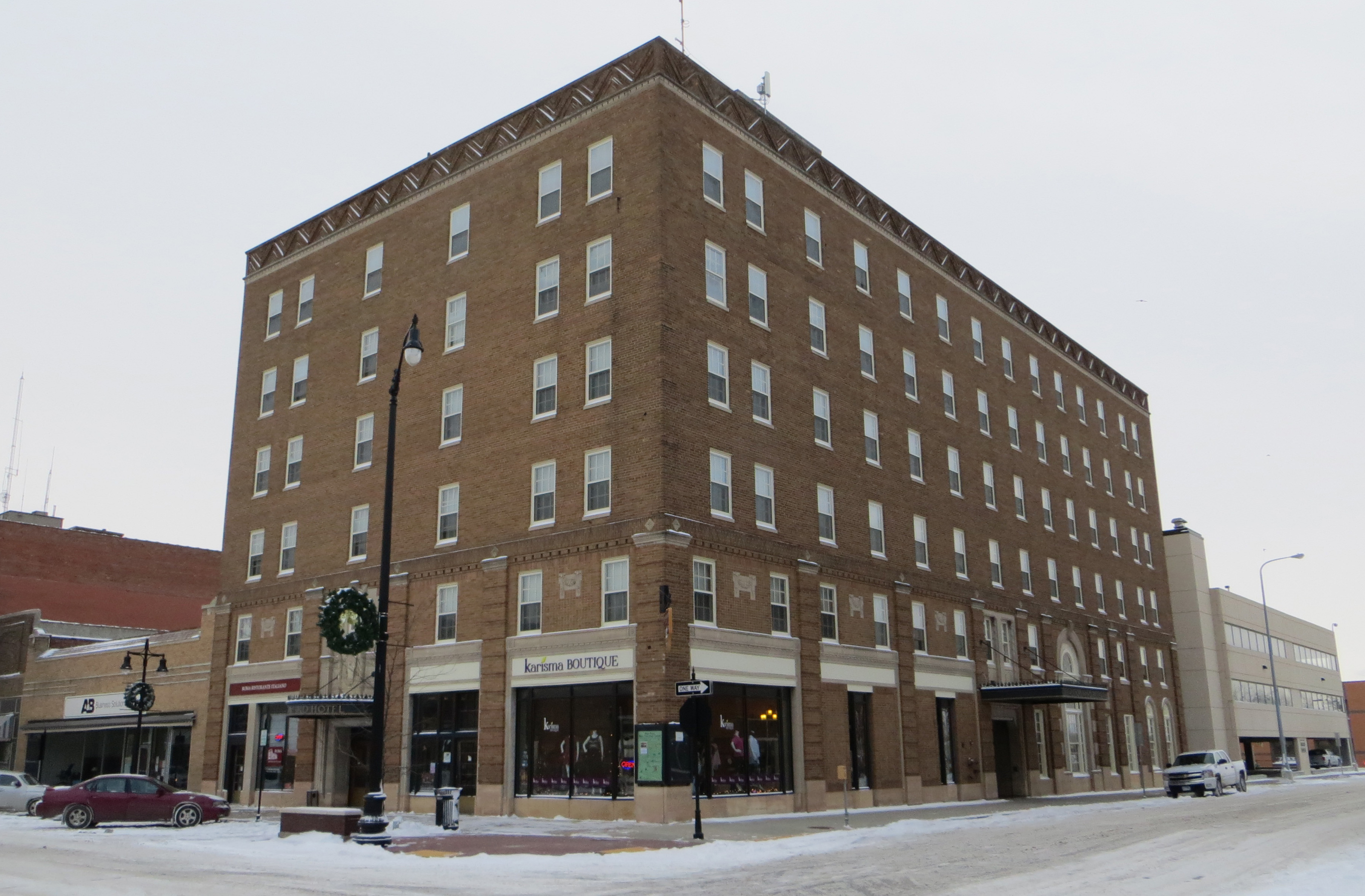
- Building in 2015

- Location within South Dakota Location within the United States
- Location: 104 South Main Street, Aberdeen, South Dakota
- Coordinates: 45°27′50″N 98°29′18″W
- Built: 1927–1928
- Architect: Ellerbe & Co.
- Part of: Aberdeen Commercial Historic District (ID88000586)
- NRHP reference No.: 82003915

Significant dates
- Added to NRHP: June 17, 1982
- Designated CP: May 23, 1988

The Alonzo Ward Hotel is a historic hotel in Aberdeen, South Dakota. It is individually listed on the National Register of Historic Places and is a contributing property to the Aberdeen Commercial Historic District.

== History ==
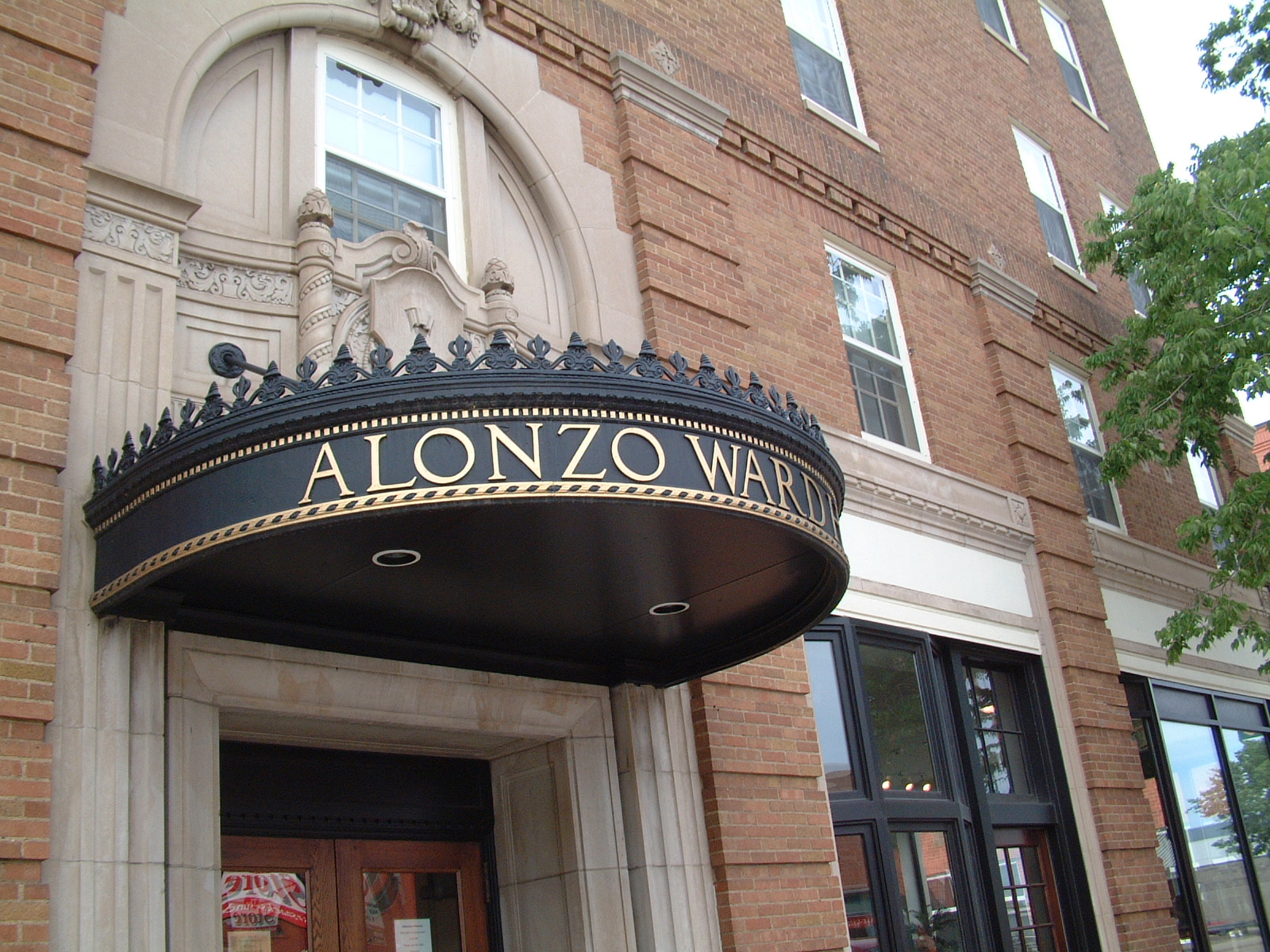
Detail of entrance in 2007

Businessman Alonzo Ward first built a hotel on the site in 1894. In November 1926, this first structure was destroyed in a fire. Work began on a replacement building in 1927 with the new hotel opening in May 1928.

The first radio station in Aberdeen, KABR, began operations on the sixth floor in 1935.

The building was listed on the National Register of Historic Places on June 17, 1982. The building is also listed on the National Register as a key contributing property of the Aberdeen Commercial Historic District; the district was listed on May 23, 1988.

From 2002 through 2004, 90 of the original hotel rooms on floors 3–6 were converted into 15 condominiums and the second-floor ballroom was restored. In mid-2017, however, plans were made to convert the ballroom into apartments because it was used too infrequently to be economically viable. In October 2017, a semi-truck struck an overhang on the hotel's north side, cracking one corner of it.

== Architecture ==
The hotel is a six-story building made of steel-reinforced concrete with a brick facade. It was designed by architecture firm Ellerbe & Co. The building features a mix of architectural styles, including English vernacular revival and Art Deco.

The facade is visually composed of three layers. The first and second floors form the base, divided from the upper floors by a belt course of vertically laid bricks. Floors 3–6 form the middle layer. At the top is a cornice of brick laid diagonally in an Art Deco zig-zag pattern.

== See also ==
- Western Union Building (Aberdeen, South Dakota)
- National Register of Historic Places listings in Brown County, South Dakota
