= Aurland United Norwegian Lutheran Church =

Historic church in South Dakota, United States

- U.S. National Register of Historic Places
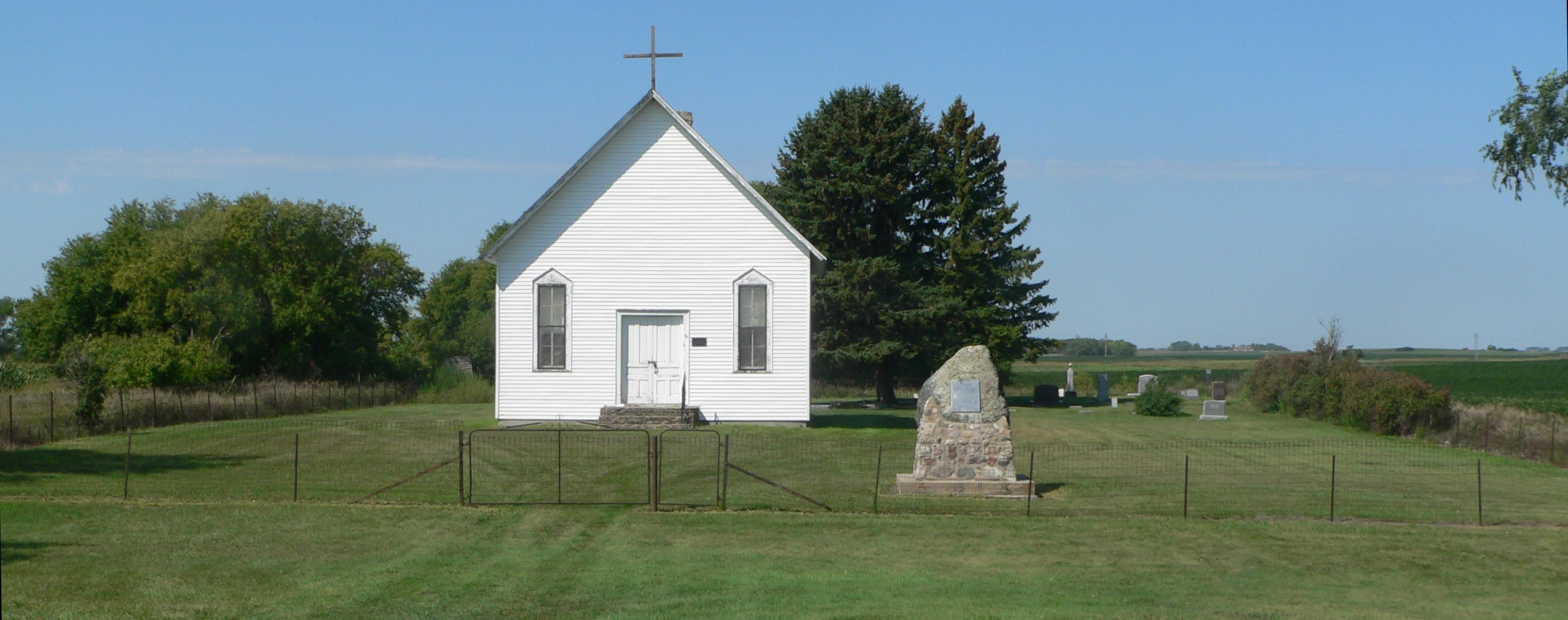
- Church, cemetery, and 1961 monument

- Location within South Dakota Location within the United States
- Nearest city: Frederick, South Dakota
- Coordinates: 45.770448°N 98.415208°W
- Built: 1903-05
- NRHP reference No.: 82003916
- Added to NRHP: April 16, 1982

The Aurland United Norwegian Lutheran Church is a church located southeast of Frederick, South Dakota, built in 1903–1905. It is no longer actively used for services. The church has not been altered significantly since its construction. In 1982, it was listed in the National Register of Historic Places.

The congregation was organized in 1885. The church was patterned after the home church of immigrants from Aurland Municipality in the Sogn district of Norway.

According to church records, the last regular service was held in 1953. Records are now housed at St. Paul's Lutheran Church in Frederick, South Dakota.

Maintenance of the church and cemetery is done by local descendants of original charter members.

In 1961 a monument was erected and dedicated to the families that were members of the church when it closed. The rock at the top of the monument came from the pasture of Lewis Tveit, the son of charter members Iver and Marta Tveit. Encased in the monument is the original communion ware used in the church.
