= Battle of Savo =

Battle of Savo may refer to:

- Battle of Savo Island (9 August 1942), between the Imperial Japanese Navy and Allied naval forces
- Second Battle of Savo Island or Battle of Cape Esperance (11–12 October 1942)
- Third Battle of Savo Island or Naval Battle of Guadalcanal (12–15 November 1942)
- Fourth Battle of Savo Island (disambiguation)
