= Augustana Swedish Lutheran Church =

Historic church in South Dakota, United States

- U.S. National Register of Historic Places
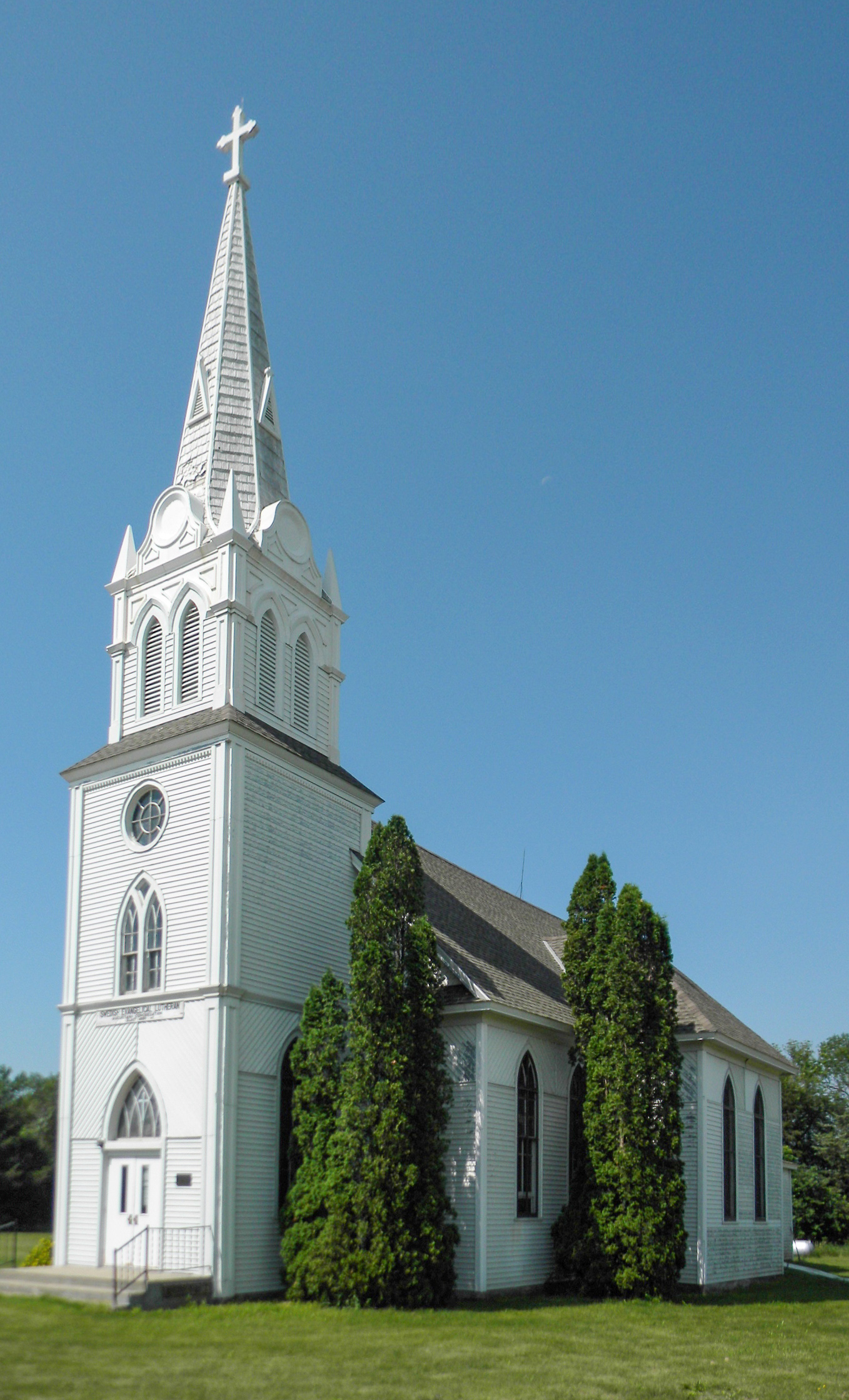
- The building in 2015.

- Location within South Dakota Location within the United States
- Nearest city: Claremont, South Dakota
- Coordinates: 45°36′4″N 98°0′2″W
- Area: less than one acre
- Built: 1899
- Built by: William Carlson
- Architectural style: Modified Nave Plan
- NRHP reference No.: 88002842
- Added to NRHP: December 20, 1988

Augustana Swedish Lutheran Church is a historic church in Claremont, South Dakota. It was built in 1899 and was added to the National Register of Historic Places in 1988.

== History ==
Swedes were among the many European ethnic immigrant groups that came to the Dakotas in the 1880s. Some settled in Brown County, South Dakota, where they soon formed the Swedish Evangelical Lutheran Augustana Church. A sister congregation began building the church in 1899 and soon after dedicated it in March, 1900. A bell for the belfry was purchased in 1903, and a full basement, coal furnace, and pipe organ were added in 1911.

Swedish was the only language used for services until 1925. Other symbols of Swedish-Lutheran ethnicity remain, however, including the raised pulpit and Gothic-style elements such as the tall steeple with a cross at the peak.
