= Finnish Apostolic Lutheran Church =

Historic church in South Dakota, United States

- U.S. National Register of Historic Places
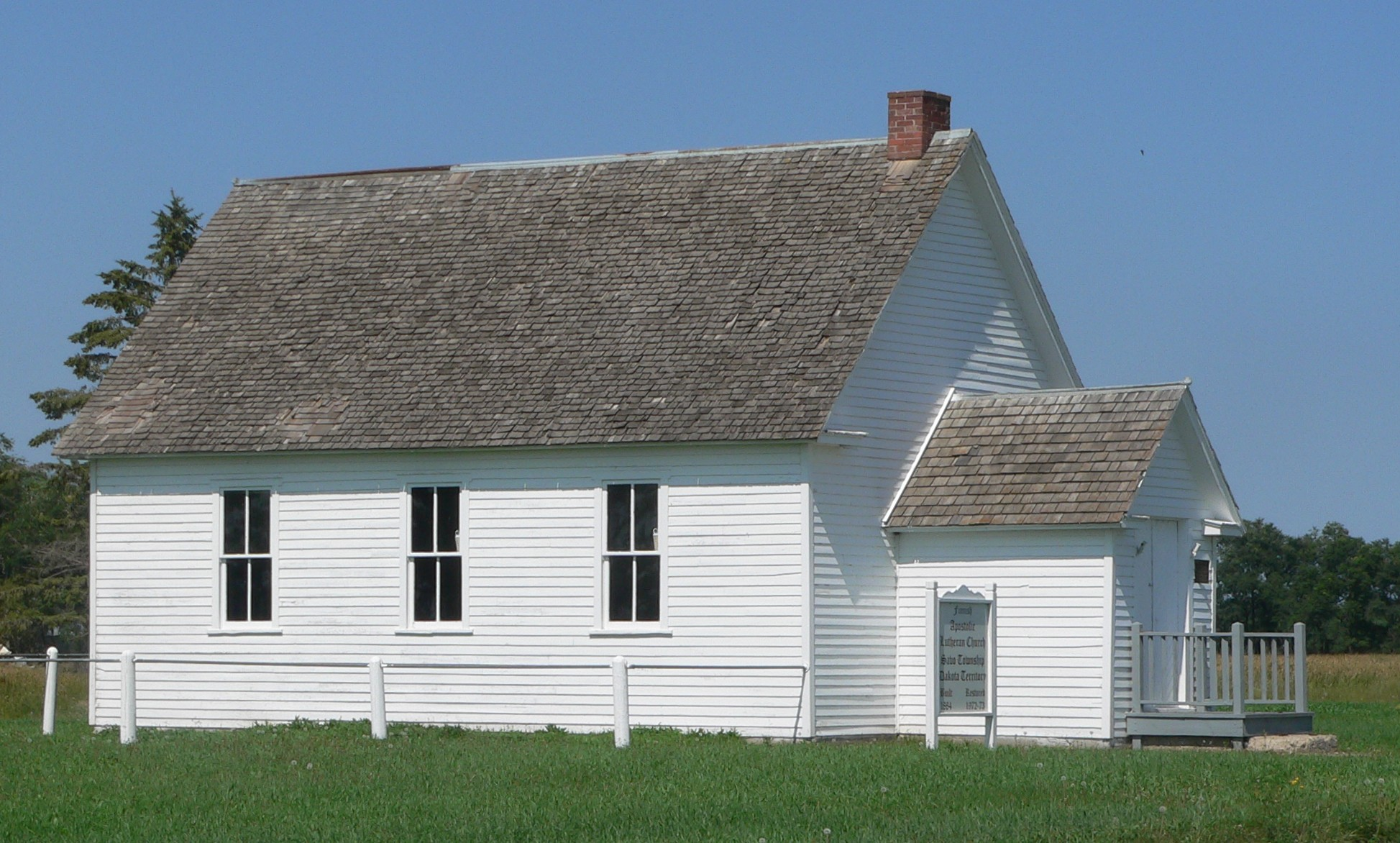

- Location within South Dakota Location within the United States
- Nearest city: Frederick, South Dakota
- Coordinates: 45.923291°N 98.393968°W
- Built: 1884
- NRHP reference No.: 84003223
- Added to NRHP: May 31, 1984

The Finnish Apostolic Lutheran Church in Brown County, South Dakota was built in 1884. It was added to the National Register of Historic Places in 1984.

It served Finnish immigrants, "which in east central South Dakota came primarily from Oulu Province or far northern Finland. This was the area in which the Apostolic movement had its beginnings and greatest popularity in Finland."

== See also ==
- Greasewood Finnish Apostolic Lutheran Church, Oregon, also NRHP-listed
