= Savonia =

Savonia or Savonian may refer to:

- Savonia (historical province), historical region in eastern Finland
  - Northern Savonia, a present-day region of Finland
  - Southern Savonia, a present-day region of Finland
- Savonian dialects, forms of Finnish language spoken in Savonia and other parts of Eastern Finland
- Savonian people, Finnish people descending from the inhabitants of historical province of Savonia
- Savonia University of Applied Sciences, a university in North Savo, Finland

== See also ==
- Savo (disambiguation)
- Savona, a port in Italy
