= Martilla–Pettingel and Gorder General Merchandise Store =

- U.S. National Register of Historic Places
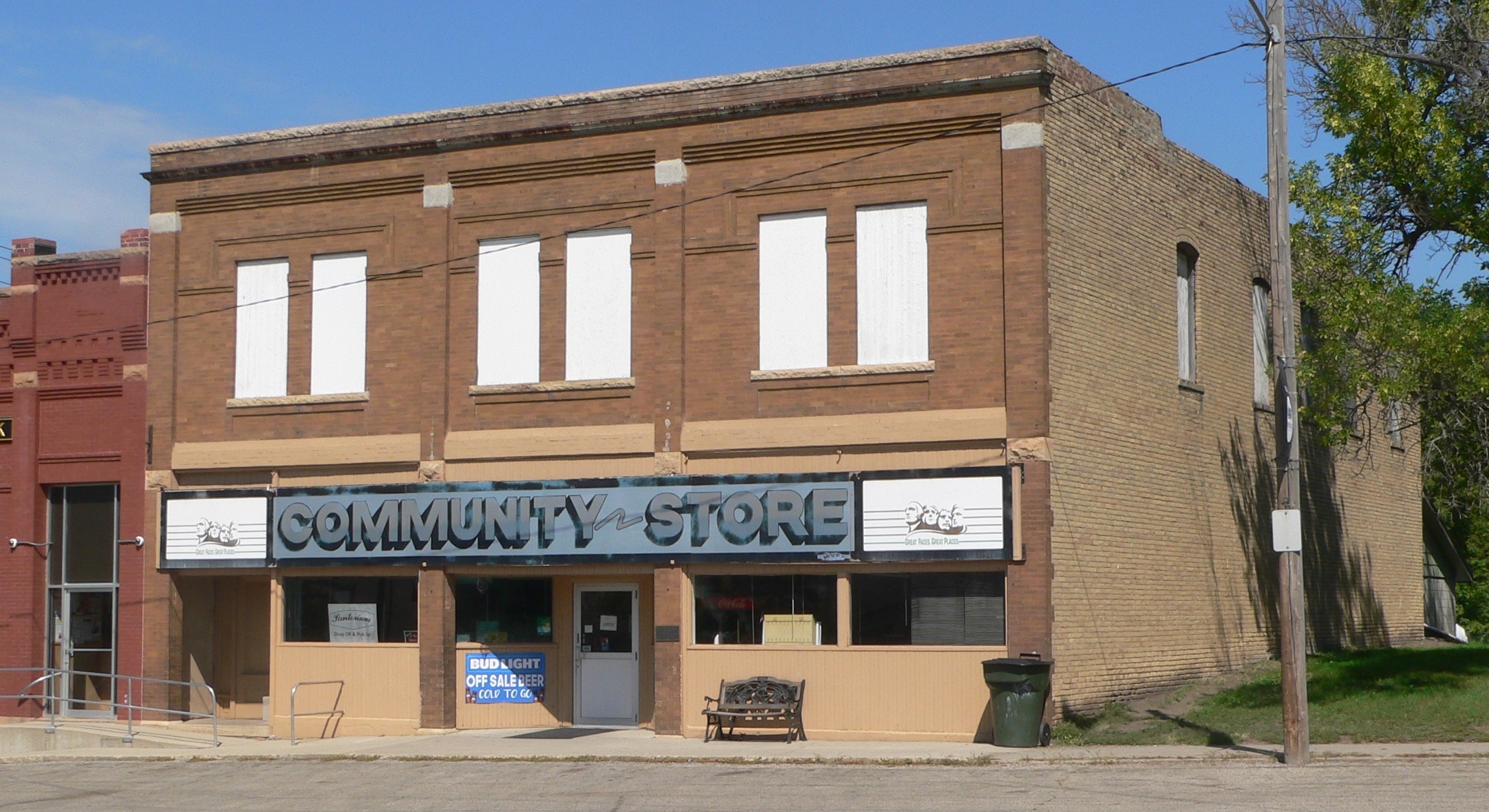

- Location within South Dakota Location within the United States
- Location: 312 Main St., Frederick, South Dakota
- Coordinates: 45.832519°N 98.505892°W
- Built: 1906
- MPS: Architecture of Finnish Settlement TR
- NRHP reference No.: 85003490
- Added to NRHP: November 13, 1985

The Martilla–Pettingel and Gorder General Merchandise Store, more recently operated as the Frederick Community Store, is a store located at 312 Main St. in Frederick, South Dakota. Built in 1906, the store was originally run by Finnish immigrant August Martilla, Norwegian immigrant Paul Groder, and E. G. Pettingel. The store, which sold drugs, hardware, and general goods, closed a few years after it opened. In 1918, four Finnish immigrants opened a new store in the building, the Co-Operative Mercantile Store. Cooperative businesses were popular among Finnish immigrants, as agricultural work in Finland was frequently shared as well.

In the mid-1980s, with the store on the verge of closing, several dozen residents raised enough money to buy the store, which they operated as the Frederick Community Store. The store is managed by a seven-member board, with labor provided by volunteers. The strategy is one that has been used by several small South Dakota towns trying to keep the local grocery store open.

The store was added to the National Register of Historic Places on November 13, 1985.
