= Robert A. Johnson (South Dakota politician) =

American politician

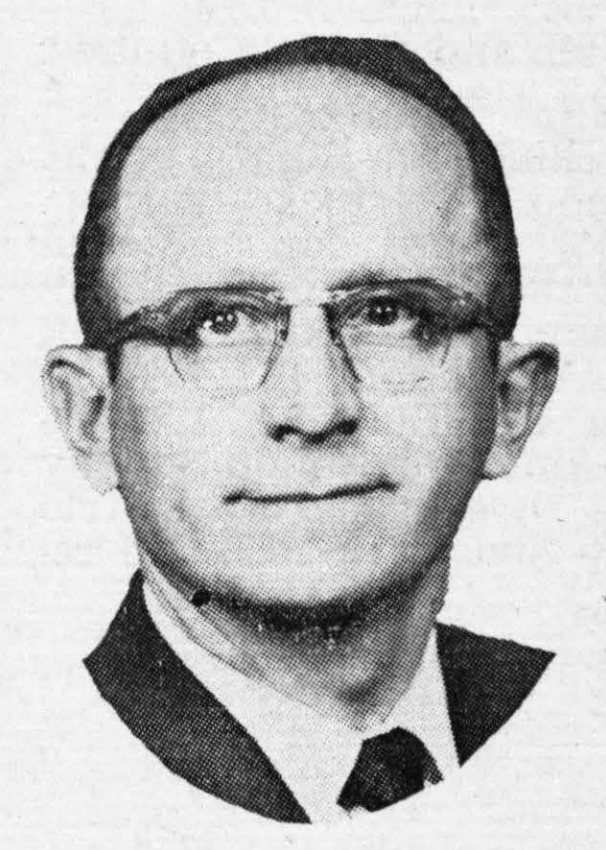

Member of the South Dakota Senate for the 22nd district
- In office 1957–1962

Personal details
- Born: September 29, 1921 Chicago, Illinois
- Died: December 11, 2014 (aged 93) Groton, South Dakota
- Party: Democratic
- Profession: insurance agent, farmer

Robert A. Johnson (September 29, 1921 – December 11, 2014) was an American politician in the state of South Dakota. He was a member of the South Dakota State Senate. Born in Chicago, Illinois, Johnson grew up on a farm in Groton, South Dakota. He was an alumnus of South Dakota State University and was a farmer and insurance agent. He died on December 11, 2014.
