= Trinity Episcopal Church (Groton, South Dakota) =

Historic church in South Dakota, United States

- U.S. National Register of Historic Places
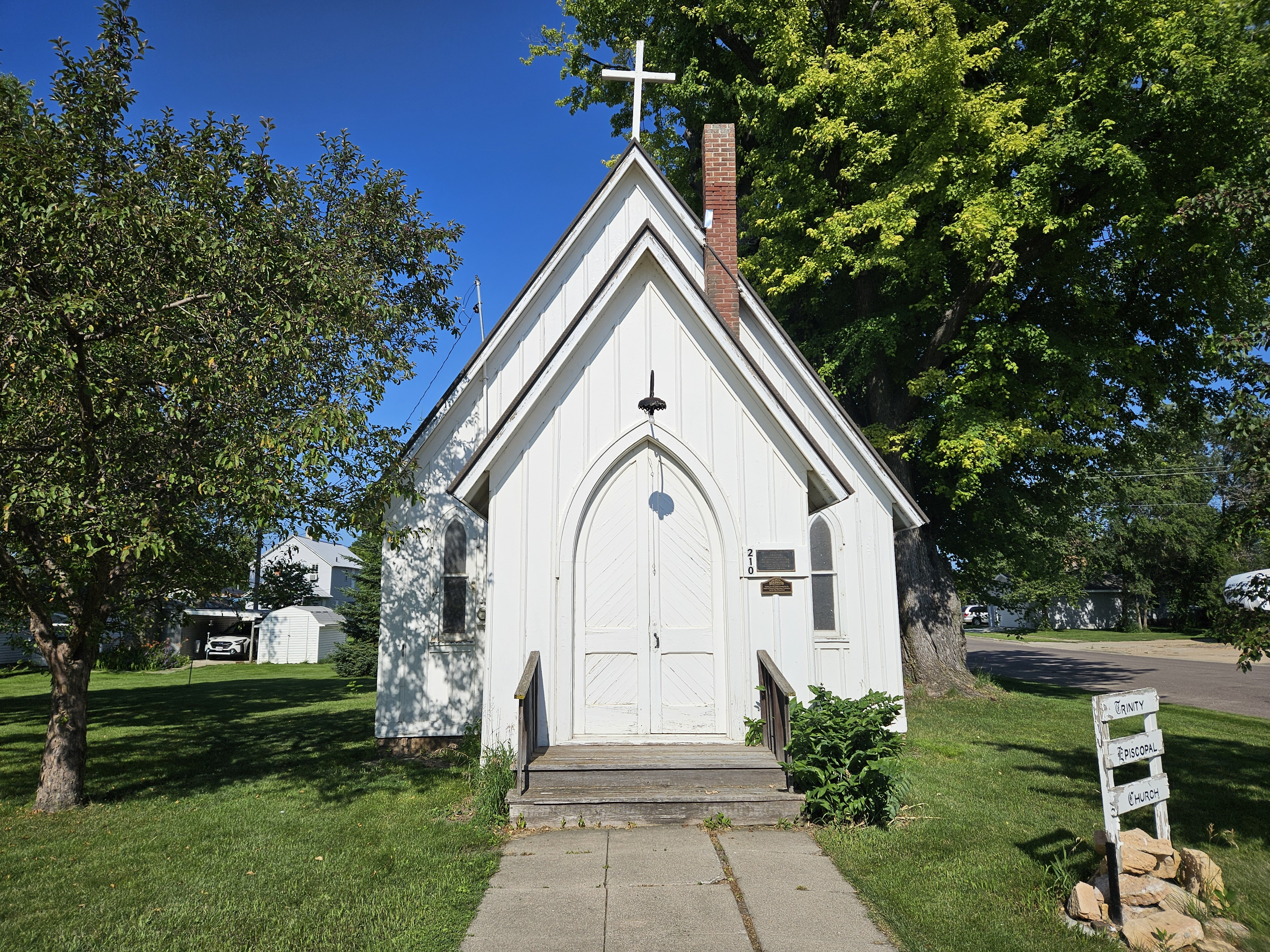

- Location within South Dakota Location within the United States
- Location: 3rd Ave. E. and 3rd St. N., Groton, South Dakota
- Coordinates: 45°26′55″N 98°5′54″W
- Area: 7.5 acres (3.0 ha)
- Built: 1884
- Architectural style: Mid 19th Century Revival
- NRHP reference No.: 83003003
- Added to NRHP: January 27, 1983

The Trinity Episcopal Church in Groton, South Dakota is a historic church at 3rd Avenue East and 3rd Street North. It was built in 1884 and was added to the National Register in 1983.

It was built to a design published in Richard Upjohn's 1852 book Rural Architecture.

== History ==
Trinity Episcopal Church is the single remaining example of rural board-and-batten in South Dakota. Only three such churches were built in South Dakota.

The church was built between July 1, 1883 and June 30, 1884 and cost $1,200 to build; the altar window was shipped from Connecticut and the brass altar vases and cross was donated by the R. A. Mather family. Bishop William Hobart Hare served the church in its early years. The church had one resident rector between 1895–1896, the Rev. T. H. J. Walton. The church ceased active services in the 1960s and the building was donated to the Brown County Historical Society in 1974.
