= Welsh Presbyterian Church (Plana, South Dakota) =

Historic church in South Dakota, United States

- U.S. National Register of Historic Places
- Location within South Dakota Location within the United States
- Location: 7 mi. N of SD 12 and 1 mi. E of SD 16,, Plana, South Dakota
- Coordinates: 45°31′8″N 98°18′39″W
- Area: less than one acre
- Built: 1887
- MPS: Rural Resources of Brown County MPS
- NRHP reference No.: 95000776
- Added to NRHP: July 6, 1995

The Welsh Presbyterian Church in Plana, South Dakota is a historic church about 7 miles (11 km) north of SD 12 and 1 mile (1.6 km) east of SD 16. The church was built in 1887 by Welsh immigrants. It was added to the National Register of Historic Places in 1995.

It is a one-story front-gable vernacular style building, on a concrete foundation which was new in 1995.

== History ==
Prior to the construction of the church, members of the church held services in the Bath Depot and private residences from 1882-1887. The church initially featured an organ and two services each Sunday, one in Welsh and one in English.

The first minister was Reverend J.W. Morgan who came from Wisconsin. By 1900, the church had a parsonage but it was sold to George Little in 1928 and moved to his farm south of Plana.

The church held regular services until 1941.
