= Plana, South Dakota =

Coordinates: 45°31′09″N 98°18′33″W

Plana, South Dakota is a former village within Cambria Township in Brown County, South Dakota, United States. It was established in 1887 and grew to include three grain elevators, a railroad depot and more. It declined after its general store was burned in 1927. In 1994 the only surviving structures were a former community hall, a school, and the Welsh Presbyterian Church.
