= Savo Hall =

- Savo Hall-Finnish National Society Hall
- U.S. National Register of Historic Places
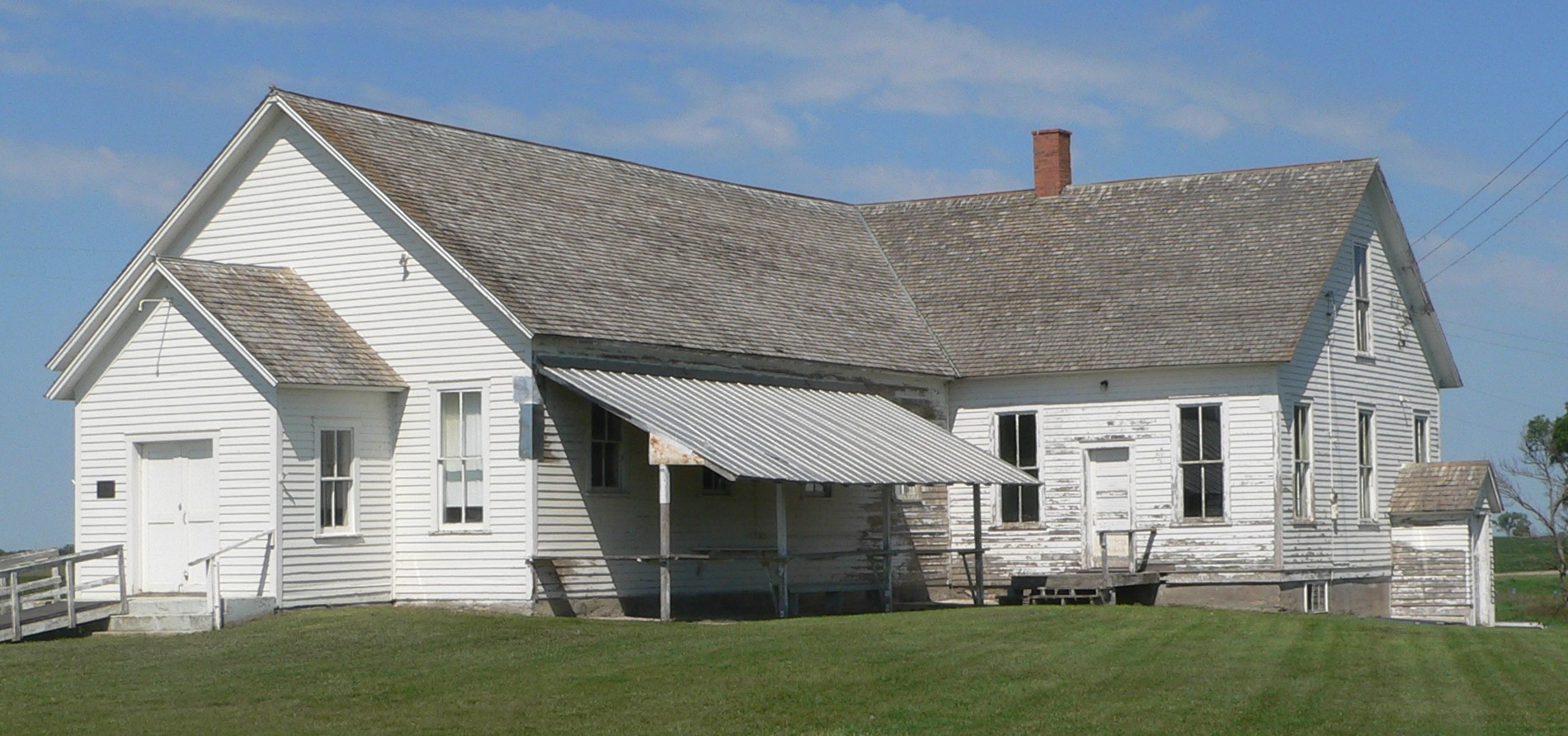

- Location within South Dakota Location within the United States
- Location: 104 St and 391 Ave
- Coordinates: 45.879698°N 98.414216°W
- Built: 1899
- Built by: Jacob Erkilla et al.
- MPS: Architecture of Finnish Settlement TR
- NRHP reference No.: 85003494
- Added to NRHP: November 13, 1985

Savo Hall, also known as the Finnish National Society Hall, is a historic meeting hall in Savo Township, Brown County, South Dakota. The hall was constructed in 1899 to serve as a meeting place for Savo's Finnish-American community. The Finnish National Society of Savo, formed the previous year, built the hall; the society consisted of Finnish-American residents of the area and largely consisted of members of the local Finnish Evangelical Lutheran Church. The hall hosted a variety of social functions, including theatrical and musical shows, sporting events, and temperance meetings. Of the four Finnish-American social halls built in South Dakota, the hall is the only one still in existence.

The hall was added to the National Register of Historic Places on November 13, 1985.
