= Plana School =

Schoolhouse in South Dakota, United States

- U.S. National Register of Historic Places
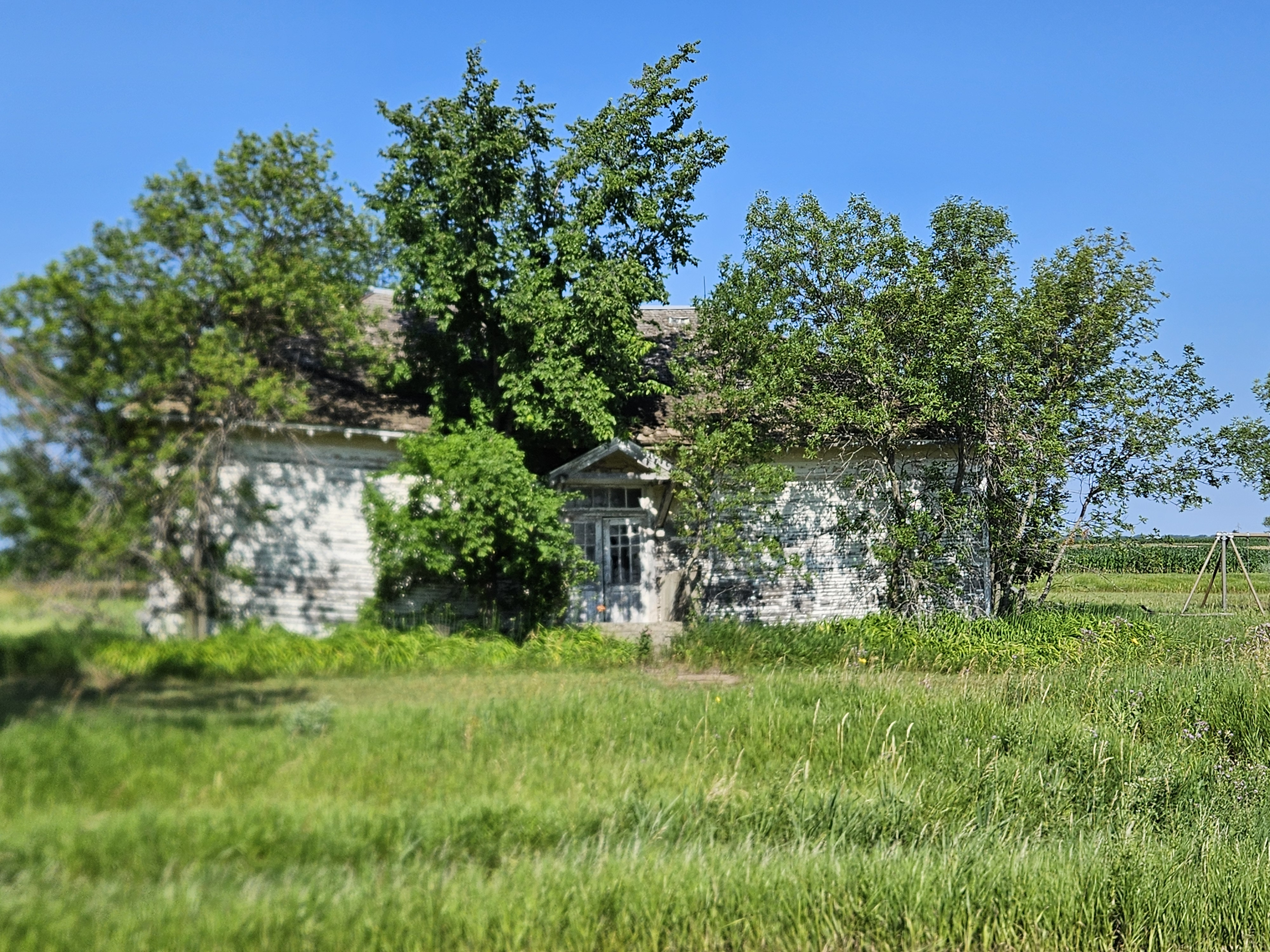
- Plana School in South Dakota

- Location within South Dakota Location within the United States
- Nearest city: Bath, South Dakota
- Coordinates: 45.517778°N 98.309444°W
- Built: 1912
- NRHP reference No.: 95000773
- Added to NRHP: July 7, 1995

The Plana School is a historic schoolhouse located in the Cambria Township in Brown County, South Dakota.

The school is a frame, one-story, two-room school in the Craftsman Style. There is a contributing outhouse to the west side of the school and is a two-seater outhouse.

It was added to the National Register of Historic Places on July 7, 1995.

== History ==
The Plana School was constructed in 1912 and opened for the 1912–1913 school year and was the fourth frame schoolhouse in the district, with the Plana School being the only two-room school in the township.

The first two teachers who taught at Plana School were Hazel Wolcott and Margaret Griffith, they taught a total of 35 students.

The school closed in the 1960s when school districts consolidated in Brown County.
