= Western Union Building (Aberdeen, South Dakota) =

- U.S. National Register of Historic Places
- U.S. Historic district – Contributing property
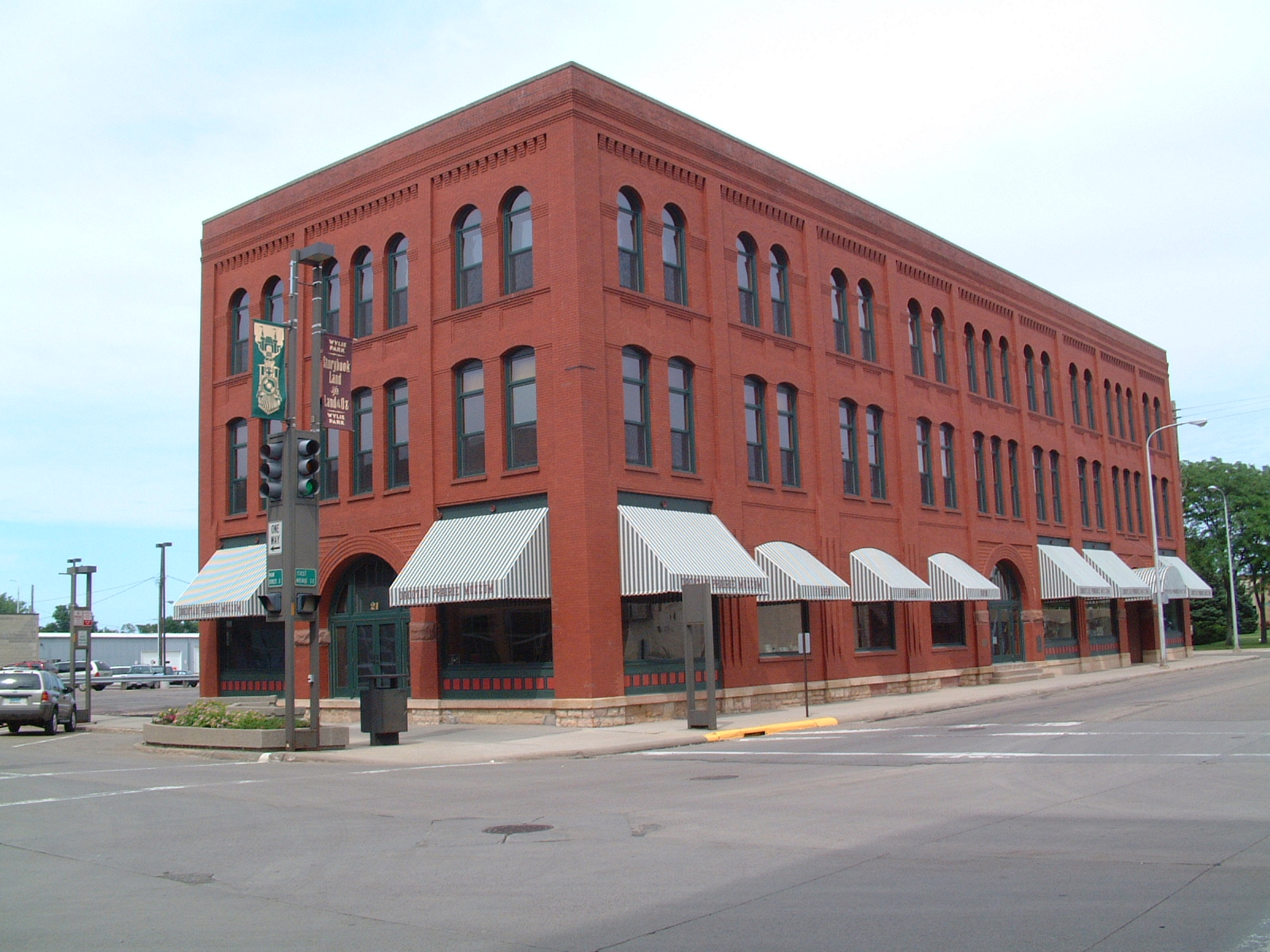
- Building in 2007

- Location within South Dakota Location within the United States
- Location: 21-23 South Main Street, Aberdeen, South Dakota
- Coordinates: 45.4643°N 98.4877°W
- Built: 1888–1889
- Part of: Aberdeen Commercial Historic District (ID88000586)
- NRHP reference No.: 76001721

Significant dates
- Added to NRHP: December 12, 1976
- Designated CP: May 23, 1988

The Western Union Building, formerly known as the Hagerty Block and currently as the Dacotah Prairie Museum, is a historic bank building in Aberdeen, South Dakota. It is individually listed on the National Register of Historic Places and is a contributing property to the Aberdeen Commercial Historic District.

== History ==
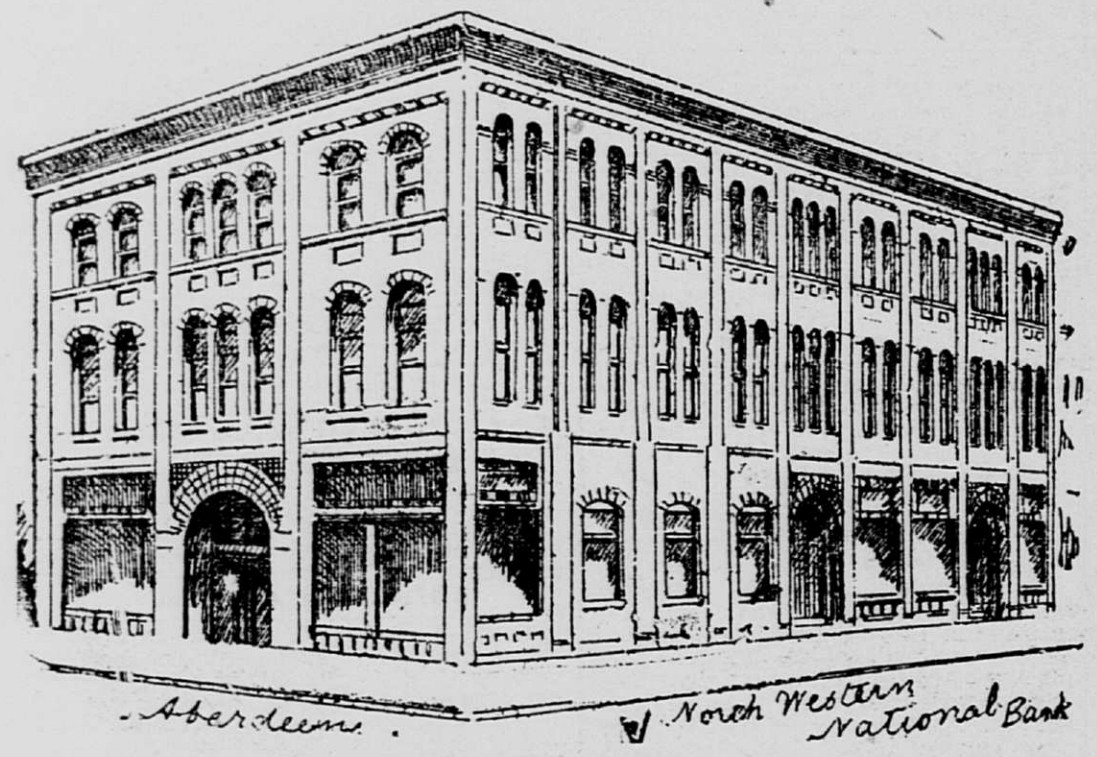
Drawing of the building from 1889 when it was the Northwestern National Bank

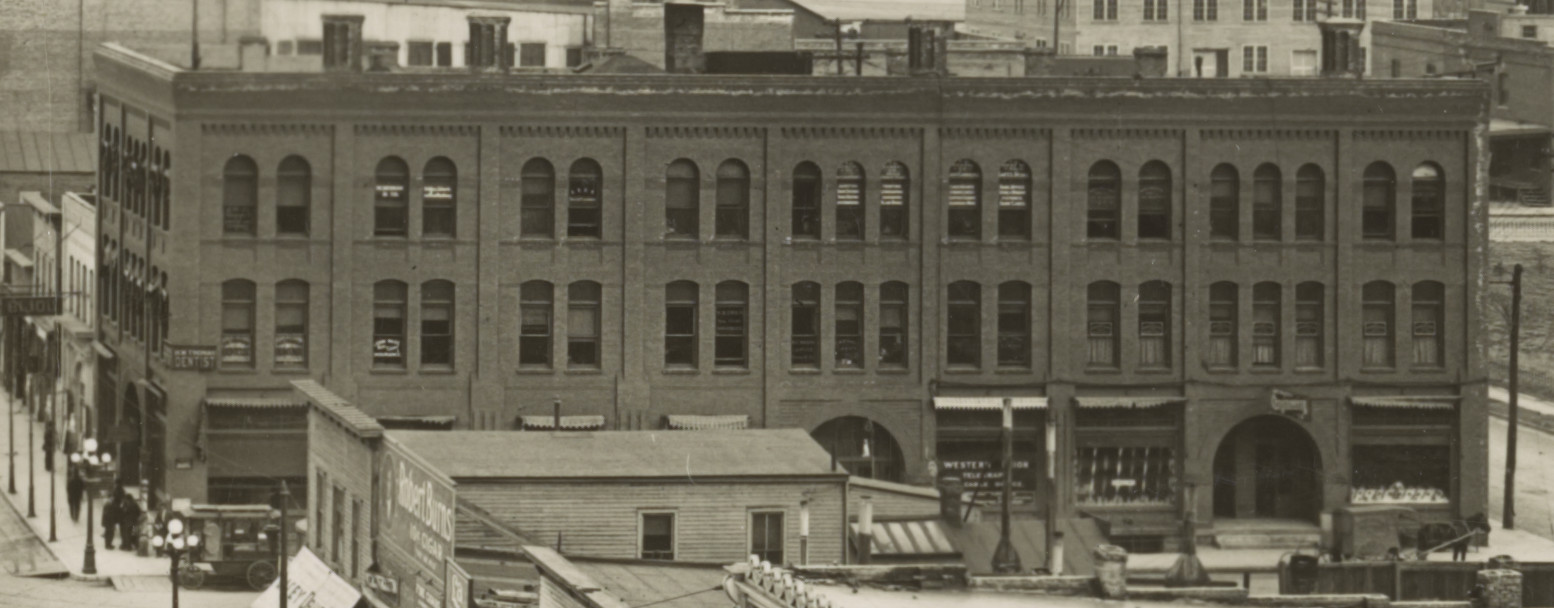
The building circa 1912

The Northwestern National Bank formed in Aberdeen in 1888 with Henry Marple as president. In August 1888, the bank purchased the property and general store at 21–23 South Main Street to build a new bank building. Construction took place from 1888 through 1889 (Note: The NRHP nomination form indicates construction as lasting 1888–1890.) with the bank opening in the new location in February 1889. In May 1891, a fire damaged the building and gutted the Kearney and Boyer grocery store. In March 1903, another fire damaged the building, originating in the basement banana room of the Gamble & Robinson grocery store.

The building was purchased by Jay Hagerty in 1907, becoming known as the Hagerty Block. (Note: The NRHP nomination form misspells it as "Hoggarty".) In 1920, existing tenant Western Union took over the most prominent space in the building, which then became known as the Western Union Building. Over the years, aside from the bank, the building housed grocery stores and several offices. In 1970, the building was donated to Brown County for a museum, which opened as the Dacotah Prairie Museum that October. By 1980 the museum was the sole occupant of the building.

The building was nominated for the National Register of Historic Places as the only remaining 19th century bank building in Aberdeen; it was listed on December 12, 1976. The building is also listed on the National Register as a key contributing property of the Aberdeen Commercial Historic District; the district was listed on May 23, 1988.

== Architecture ==
The Western Union Building is an example of Romanesque Revival architecture. The structure is a three-story building made of red brick laid in running bond. There are three main entrances, each framed by a large arch and set a few steps above street level. Pilasters extend the full height of the building, separating windows on the first floor and window pairs on the second and third floors. The interior has undergone renovations, but the exterior has changed little over the building's history.

== See also ==
- Alonzo Ward Hotel
- National Register of Historic Places listings in Brown County, South Dakota
- List of museums in South Dakota
- List of natural history museums in the United States
