= Fourth Battle of Savo Island =

Fourth Battle of Savo Island may refer to the following battles during the Guadalcanal Campaign in the Pacific War of World War II:

- Naval Battle of Guadalcanal, a battle that took place November 12–15, 1942
- Battle of Tassafaronga, a battle that took place November 30, 1942
