= Claremont, South Dakota =

- Town
- Location in Brown County and the state of South Dakota
- Coordinates: 45°40′19″N 98°00′56″W
- Country: United States
- State: South Dakota
- County: Brown
- Incorporated: 1903

Area
  - Total: 0.25 sq mi (0.66 km^{2})
  - Land: 0.25 sq mi (0.65 km^{2})
  - Water: 0.0039 sq mi (0.01 km^{2})
- Elevation: 1,299 ft (396 m)

Population (2020)
  - Total: 108
  - Density: 430.4/sq mi (166.17/km^{2})
- Time zone: UTC-6 (Central (CST))
  - Summer (DST): UTC-5 (CDT)
- ZIP code: 57432
- Area code: 605
- FIPS code: 46-12100
- GNIS feature ID: 1267329

Claremont is a town in Brown County, South Dakota, United States. The population was 108 at the 2020 census.

It was incorporated in 1903 and has been home to a post office since 1887. The town most likely was named after Claremont, New Hampshire.

== Geography ==
According to the United States Census Bureau, the town has a total area of 0.26 square miles (0.67 km^{2}), of which 0.25 square miles (0.65 km^{2}) is land and 0.01 square miles (0.03 km^{2}) is water.

== Demographics ==
Historical population
| Census | Pop. | Note | %± |
|---|---|---|---|
| 1890 | 121 | | — |
| 1900 | 120 | | −0.8% |
| 1910 | 294 | | 145.0% |
| 1920 | 290 | | −1.4% |
| 1930 | 285 | | −1.7% |
| 1940 | 271 | | −4.9% |
| 1950 | 236 | | −12.9% |
| 1960 | 247 | | 4.7% |
| 1970 | 214 | | −13.4% |
| 1980 | 180 | | −15.9% |
| 1990 | 135 | | −25.0% |
| 2000 | 130 | | −3.7% |
| 2010 | 127 | | −2.3% |
| 2020 | 108 | | −15.0% |
U.S. Decennial Census; 2017 Estimate

=== 2010 census ===
As of the census of 2010, there were 127 people, 53 households, and 32 families residing in the town. The population density was 508.0 inhabitants per square mile (196.1/km^{2}). There were 61 housing units at an average density of 244.0 per square mile (94.2/km^{2}). The racial makeup of the town was 99.2% White and 0.8% from two or more races.

There were 53 households, of which 32.1% had children under the age of 18 living with them, 45.3% were married couples living together, 7.5% had a female householder with no husband present, 7.5% had a male householder with no wife present, and 39.6% were non-families. 32.1% of all households were made up of individuals, and 20.8% had someone living alone who was 65 years of age or older. The average household size was 2.40 and the average family size was 3.03.

The median age in the town was 40.3 years. 26.8% of residents were under the age of 18; 6.3% were between the ages of 18 and 24; 22.8% were from 25 to 44; 22.8% were from 45 to 64; and 21.3% were 65 years of age or older. The gender makeup of the town was 48.8% male and 51.2% female.

=== 2000 census ===
As of the census of 2000, there were 130 people, 60 households, and 39 families residing in the town. The population density was 469.1 inhabitants per square mile (181.1/km^{2}). There were 75 housing units at an average density of 270.6 per square mile (104.5/km^{2}). The racial makeup of the town was 100.00% White.

There were 60 households, out of which 23.3% had children under the age of 18 living with them, 51.7% were married couples living together, 10.0% had a female householder with no husband present, and 35.0% were non-families. 33.3% of all households were made up of individuals, and 16.7% had someone living alone who was 65 years of age or older. The average household size was 2.17 and the average family size was 2.74.

In the town, the population was spread out, with 22.3% under the age of 18, 6.2% from 18 to 24, 20.8% from 25 to 44, 30.8% from 45 to 64, and 20.0% who were 65 years of age or older. The median age was 45 years. For every 100 females, there were 94.0 males. For every 100 females age 18 and over, there were 83.6 males.

The median income for a household in the town was $17,333, and the median income for a family was $20,417. Males had a median income of $21,094 versus $11,000 for females. The per capita income for the town was $9,505. There were 17.1% of families and 19.9% of the population living below the poverty line, including 25.0% of under eighteens and 16.0% of those over 64.
