= Groton, South Dakota =

- City
- Logo

- Location in Brown County and the state of South Dakota
- Coordinates: 45°27′06″N 98°06′00″W
- Country: United States
- State: South Dakota
- County: Brown
- Founded: 1881
- Incorporated: 1888

Area
  - Total: 1.75 sq mi (4.54 km^{2})
  - Land: 1.75 sq mi (4.54 km^{2})
  - Water: 0 sq mi (0.00 km^{2})
- Elevation: 1,303 ft (397 m)

Population (2020)
  - Total: 1,380
  - Density: 788.0/sq mi (304.24/km^{2})
- Time zone: UTC−6 (Central (CST))
  - Summer (DST): UTC−5 (CDT)
- ZIP code: 57445
- Area code: 605
- FIPS code: 46-26340
- GNIS feature ID: 1267410
- Website: www.grotonsd.gov

Groton is a city in southeastern Brown County, South Dakota, United States. The population was 1,380 at the 2020 census.

== History ==
Groton was platted in 1881. The city was named after Groton, Massachusetts. A post office has been in operation at Groton since 1881.

== Geography ==
According to the United States Census Bureau, the city has a total area of 1.75 square miles (4.53 km^{2}), all land.

== Demographics ==
Historical population
Census	Pop.	Note	%±
1890	684		—
1900	700		2.3%
1910	1,108		58.3%
1920	1,273		14.9%
1930	1,009		−20.7%
1940	946		−6.2%
1950	1,084		14.6%
1960	1,063		−1.9%
1970	1,021		−4.0%
1980	1,230		20.5%
1990	1,196		−2.8%
2000	1,356		13.4%
2010	1,458		7.5%
2020	1,380		−5.3%
U.S. Decennial Census

=== 2020 census ===
As of the 2020 census, Groton had a population of 1,380, a median age of 40.5 years, 26.0% of residents under the age of 18, and 20.9% of residents who were 65 years of age or older.

For every 100 females there were 94.6 males overall and 91.2 males age 18 and over.

0.0% of residents lived in urban areas, while 100.0% lived in rural areas.

There were 579 households in Groton, of which 30.2% had children under the age of 18 living in them; 53.0% were married-couple households, 18.7% were households with a male householder and no spouse or partner present, and 24.4% were households with a female householder and no spouse or partner present. About 33.6% of all households were made up of individuals and 15.9% had someone living alone who was 65 years of age or older.

There were 641 housing units, of which 9.7% were vacant. The homeowner vacancy rate was 1.6% and the rental vacancy rate was 15.3%.

Racial composition as of the 2020 census
Race	Number	Percent
White	1,294	93.8%
Black or African American	2	0.1%
American Indian and Alaska Native	7	0.5%
Asian	10	0.7%
Native Hawaiian and Other Pacific Islander	0	0.0%
Some other race	15	1.1%
Two or more races	52	3.8%
Hispanic or Latino (of any race)	46	3.3%

=== 2010 census ===
As of the 2010 census, there were 1,458 people, 576 households, and 373 families living in the city. The population density was 833.1 inhabitants per square mile (321.7/km^{2}). There were 630 housing units at an average density of 360.0 per square mile (139.0/km^{2}). The racial makeup of the city was 97.5% White, 0.3% African American, 0.5% Native American, 0.1% Asian, 0.2% from other races, and 1.4% from two or more races. Hispanic or Latino of any race were 0.9% of the population.

There were 576 households, of which 34.4% had children under the age of 18 living with them, 56.1% were married couples living together, 6.4% had a female householder with no husband present, 2.3% had a male householder with no wife present, and 35.2% were non-families. 30.4% of all households were made up of individuals, and 15.4% had someone living alone who was 65 years of age or older. The average household size was 2.45 and the average family size was 3.13.

The median age in the city was 40 years. 28.5% of residents were under the age of 18; 5.5% were between the ages of 18 and 24; 22.9% were from 25 to 44; 23.7% were from 45 to 64; and 19.4% were 65 years of age or older. The gender makeup of the city was 49.3% male and 50.7% female.

=== 2000 census ===
As of the 2000 census, there were 1,356 people, 524 households, and 372 families living in the city. The population density was 796.5 inhabitants per square mile (307.5/km^{2}). There were 581 housing units at an average density of 341.3 per square mile (131.8/km^{2}). The racial makeup of the city was 99.04% White, 0.52% Native American, 0.07% from other races, and 0.37% from two or more races. Hispanic or Latino of any race were 0.44% of the population.

There were 524 households, out of which 35.7% had children under the age of 18 living with them, 59.7% were married couples living together, 8.8% had a female householder with no husband present, and 29.0% were non-families. 27.5% of all households were made up of individuals, and 14.7% had someone living alone who was 65 years of age or older. The average household size was 2.45 and the average family size was 2.99.

In the city, the population was spread out, with 27.8% under the age of 18, 5.7% from 18 to 24, 24.3% from 25 to 44, 20.2% from 45 to 64, and 22.0% who were 65 years of age or older. The median age was 39 years. For every 100 females, there were 88.3 males. For every 100 females age 18 and over, there were 83.0 males.

As of 2000 the median income for a household in the city was $38,125, and the median income for a family was $47,788. Males had a median income of $30,865 versus $21,688 for females. The per capita income for the city was $17,248. About 4.2% of families and 5.8% of the population were below the poverty line, including 5.5% of those under age 18 and 5.0% of those age 65 or over.

== Notable people ==
- Robert A. Johnson, farmer, businessman, and South Dakota State Senator, lived in Groton.
- Earl Sande, Hall of Fame jockey and trainer, was born in Groton.

== See also ==
- List of cities in South Dakota
