= Savo Township, Brown County, South Dakota =

Savo Township
- Township
- Location within South Dakota
- Coordinates: 45°53′36″N 98°24′51″W
- Country: United States
- State: South Dakota
- County: Brown

Area
  - Total: 35.573 sq mi (92.13 km^{2})
  - Land: 35.567 sq mi (92.12 km^{2})
  - Water: 0.006 sq mi (0.016 km^{2})
- Elevation: 1,411 ft (430 m)

Population (2010)
  - Total: 71
  - Density: 2.0/sq mi (0.77/km^{2})
- GNIS feature ID: 1268240

Savo Township is a township in Brown County, South Dakota, United States. As of the 2010 Census, it had a population of 71.

It is almost entirely populated by Finns, or people of Finnish heritage
