= Frederick, South Dakota =

- City
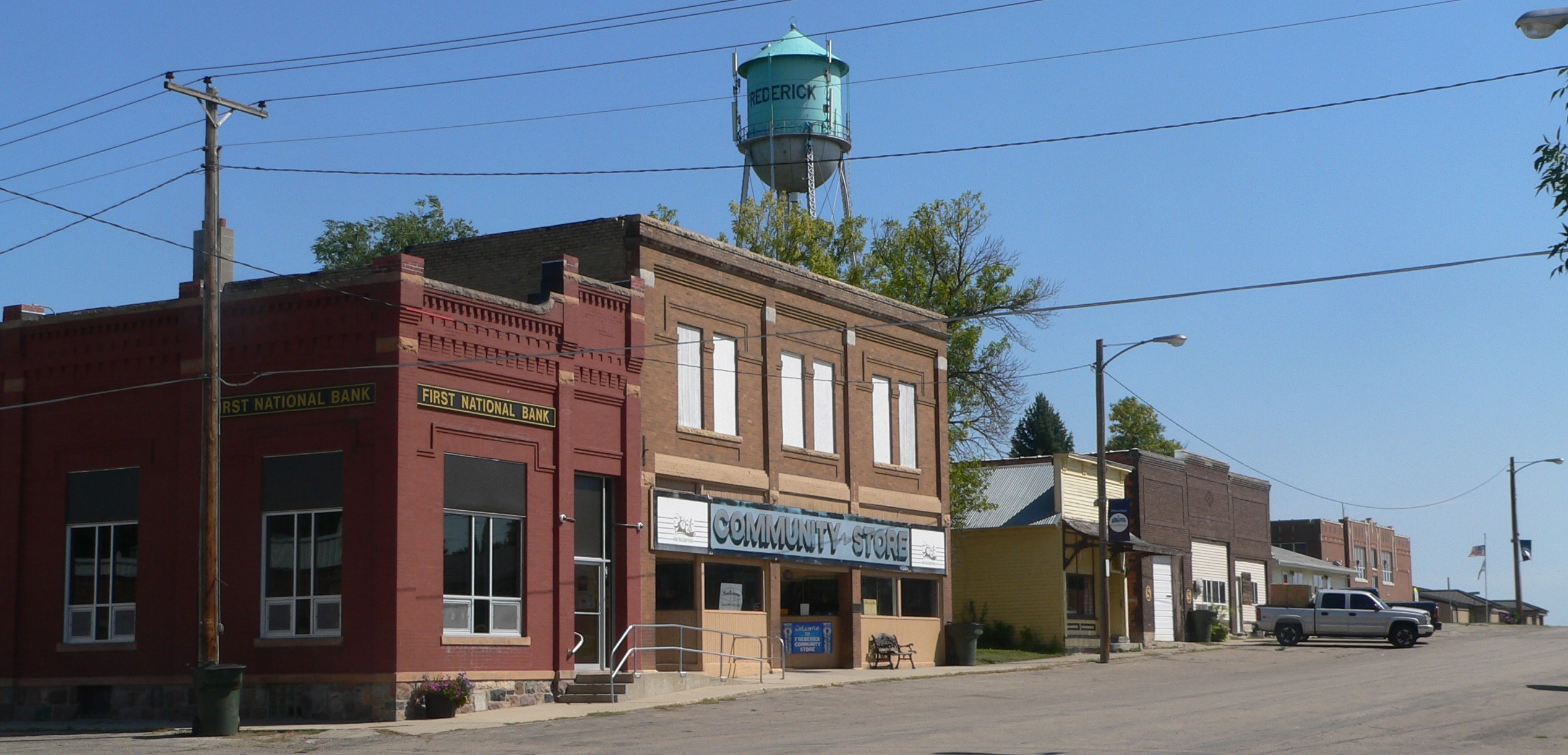
- Main Street in Frederick, August 2017

- Location in Brown County and the state of South Dakota
- Coordinates: 45°49′55″N 98°30′24″W
- Country: United States
- State: South Dakota
- County: Brown
- Settled: 1881
- Incorporated: 1882

Area
  - Total: 1.36 sq mi (3.51 km^{2})
  - Land: 1.36 sq mi (3.51 km^{2})
  - Water: 0 sq mi (0.00 km^{2})
- Elevation: 1,378 ft (420 m)

Population (2020)
  - Total: 215
  - Density: 158.7/sq mi (61.29/km^{2})
- Time zone: UTC-6 (Central (CST))
  - Summer (DST): UTC-5 (CDT)
- ZIP code: 57441
- Area code: 605
- FIPS code: 46-22860
- GNIS feature ID: 1267395
- Website: www.fredericksd.com

Frederick is a town in northwestern Brown County, South Dakota, United States. The population was 215 at the 2020 census. Home to the annual Frederick Finn Fest, the town is part of the Aberdeen Micropolitan Statistical Area.

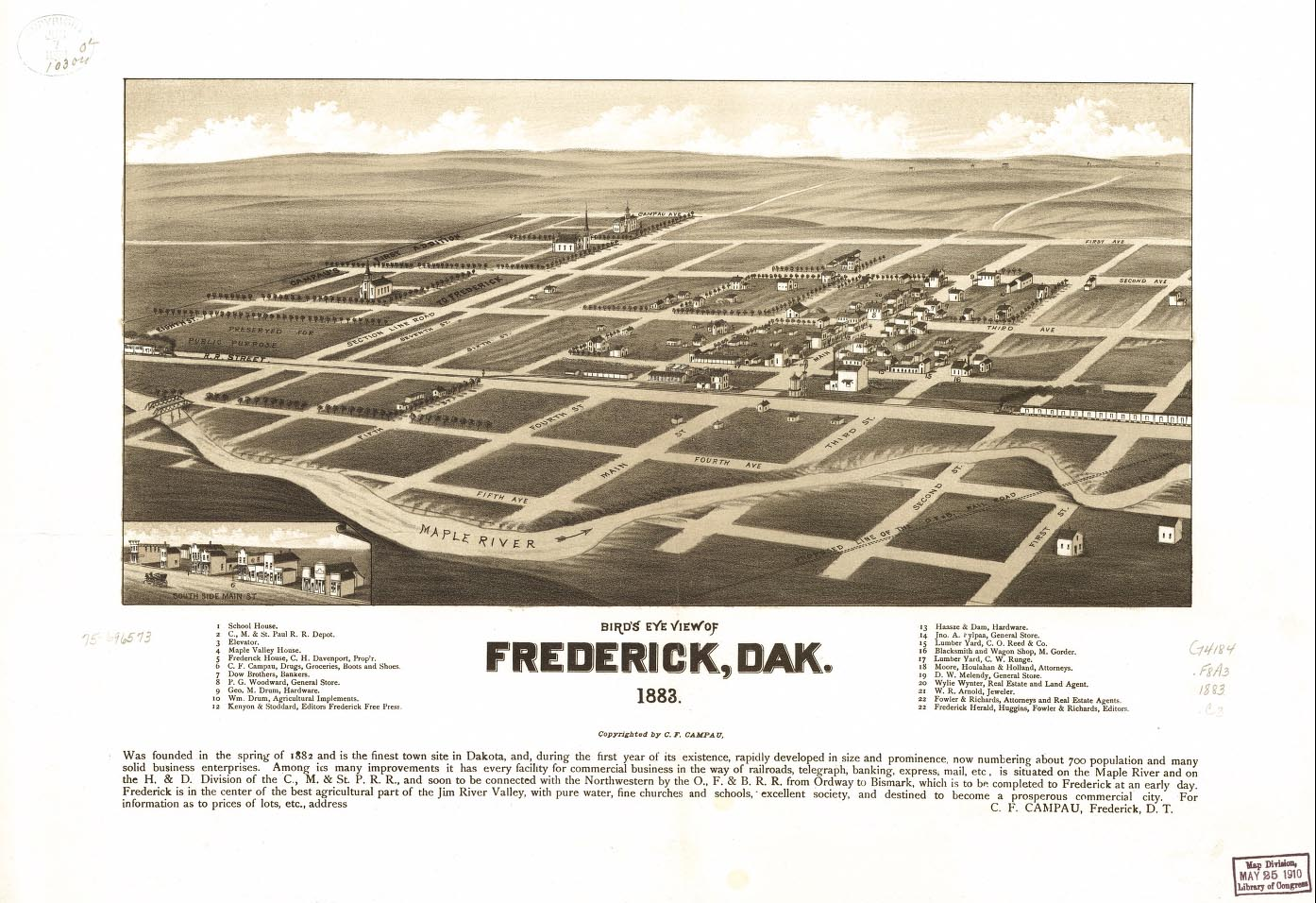
1883 illustration of Frederick

== History ==
Frederick was a railway town platted and sold to pioneers by the Chicago, Milwaukee & St. Paul Railroad, which completed track into it on September 12, 1881. Its grid of blocks was aligned by compass, with numbered avenues running north–south, and numbered streets running east–west. Main Street and Railway Avenue intersect at the grid's core. Incorporated on June 21, 1882, Frederick was named after the railroad's Finnish immigration agent and sales clerk—Kustaa "Frederick" Bergstadius.

City jail, Frederick, 1987

On July 2, 1921, a tornado swept through the downtown and "practically every building in the town was demolished", but only one resident was killed, after his home was torn from its foundation while he was trying to get his family into the storm cellar.

== Geography ==
According to the United States Census Bureau, the town has a total area of 0.39 square miles (1.01 km^{2}), all land.

Frederick is on U.S. Route 281 and is drained by the Maple River.

== Demographics ==
Historical population
Census	Pop.	Note	%±
1890	281		—
1900	251		−10.7%
1910	433		72.5%
1920	424		−2.1%
1930	461		8.7%
1940	422		−8.5%
1950	408		−3.3%
1960	381		−6.6%
1970	359		−5.8%
1980	307		−14.5%
1990	241		−21.5%
2000	255		5.8%
2010	199		−22.0%
2020	215		8.0%
U.S. Decennial Census; 2017 Estimate

=== 2010 census ===
As of the census of 2010, there were 199 people, 101 households, and 56 families living in the town. The population density was 510.3 inhabitants per square mile (197.0/km^{2}). There were 119 housing units at an average density of 305.1 per square mile (117.8/km^{2}). The racial makeup of the town was 98.5% White, 0.5% Asian, and 1.0% from two or more races.

There were 101 households, of which 22.8% had children under the age of 18 living with them, 47.5% were married couples living together, 2.0% had a female householder with no husband present, 5.9% had a male householder with no wife present, and 44.6% were non-families. 41.6% of all households were made up of individuals, and 18.8% had someone living alone who was 65 years of age or older. The average household size was 1.97 and the average family size was 2.66.

The median age in the town was 51.4 years. 19.6% of residents were under the age of 18; 2.4% were between the ages of 18 and 24; 21.5% were from 25 to 44; 29.1% were from 45 to 64; and 27.1% were 65 years of age or older. The gender makeup of the town was 55.3% male and 44.7% female.

=== 2000 census ===
As of the census of 2000, there were 255 people, 119 households, and 76 families living in the town. The population density was 699.7 inhabitants per square mile (270.2/km^{2}). There were 140 housing units at an average density of 384.2 per square mile (148.3/km^{2}). The racial makeup of the town was 97.65% White, 1.18% Native American, 0.39% from other races, and 0.78% from two or more races. Hispanic or Latino of any race were 0.39% of the population. 45.2% were of German, 22.6% Norwegian and 7.5% Finnish ancestry.

There were 119 households, out of which 27.7% had children under the age of 18 living with them, 51.3% were married couples living together, 8.4% had a female householder with no husband present, and 35.3% were non-families. 33.6% of all households were made up of individuals, and 19.3% had someone living alone who was 65 years of age or older. The average household size was 2.14 and the average family size was 2.69.

In the town, the population was spread out, with 22.7% under the age of 18, 5.9% from 18 to 24, 23.9% from 25 to 44, 25.1% from 45 to 64, and 22.4% who were 65 years of age or older. The median age was 42 years. For every 100 females, there were 91.7 males. For every 100 females age 18 and over, there were 95.0 males.

The median income for a household in the town was $31,500, and the median income for a family was $34,688. Males had a median income of $25,288 versus $18,214 for females. The per capita income for the town was $13,881. About 11.1% of families and 11.4% of the population were below the poverty line, including 13.4% of those under the age of eighteen and 18.8% of those 65 or over.

== Notable person ==
- Edward John Thye, former governor of Minnesota (1943-1947)

== See also ==
- List of towns in South Dakota
