= List of former Chicago and North Western Railway stations =

This is a list of railway depots formerly operated by the Chicago and North Western Railway.

== Illinois ==
- Sycamore station, listed on the National Register of Historic Places in DeKalb County, Illinois, located on the line between Belvidere and Spring Valley
- DeKalb station, in DeKalb County, Illinois, located on the main line between Chicago and Omaha
- Rochelle station, in Ogle County, Illinois, located on the main line between Chicago and Omaha
- Ashton station, in Ogle County, Illinois, located on the main line between Chicago and Omaha
- Nelson station (Illinois), in Lee County, Illinois, located on the main line between Chicago and Omaha
- Lyndon station, in Whiteside County, Illinois, located on the main line between Chicago and Omaha
- Wayne station (Illinois), in Du Page County, Illinois, located on the branch line between West Chicago and Freeport
- Gilberts station, in Kane County, Illinois, located on the branch line between West Chicago and Freeport
- Union station (Illinois), in McHenry County, Illinois, located on the branch line between West Chicago and Freeport
- Marengo station, in McHenry County, Illinois, located on the branch line between West Chicago and Freeport
- Belvidere station, a demolished station in Boone County, Illinois, located on the branch line between West Chicago and Freeport
- Cherry Valley station, in Winnebago County, Illinois, located on the branch line between West Chicago and Freeport
- East Rockford station, in Winnebago County, Illinois, located on the branch line between West Chicago and Freeport
- Pecatonica station, in Winnebago County, Illinois, located on the branch line between West Chicago and Freeport
- Freeport station (Illinois), in Stephenson County, Illinois, located on the branch line between West Chicago and Freeport
- Hebron station (Illinois), in McHenry County, Illinois, located on the line between Kenosha and Rockford
- Alden station, in McHenry County, Illinois, located on the line between Kenosha and Rockford
- Chemung station, in McHenry County, Illinois, located on the line between Kenosha and Rockford
- Poplar Grove station, in Boone County, Illinois, located on the line between Kenosha and Rockford
- East Dundee station, in Kane County, Illinois, located on the line between Elgin and Crystal Lake
- Ogilvie Transportation Center, in Chicago, Cook County, Illinois, main commuter and intercity passenger terminal between Chicago and Minneapolis and Omaha
- Chicago and Northwestern Depot (Wilmette, Illinois), listed on the National Register of Historic Places in Cook County, Illinois, located on the commuter line between Chicago and Kenosha
- Maplewood station (Illinois), in Chicago, Cook County, Illinois, located on the commuter line between Chicago and Harvard
- Irving Park station (Metra), in Chicago, Cook County, Illinois, located on the commuter line between Chicago and Harvard
- Kostner Avenue station, in Chicago, Cook County, Illinois, located on the commuter line between Chicago and Harvard
- Jefferson Park station, in Chicago, Cook County, Illinois, located on the commuter line between Chicago and Harvard
- Gladstone Park station, in Chicago, Cook County, Illinois, located on the commuter line between Chicago and Harvard
- Norwood Park station, listed on the National Register of Historic Places in Chicago, Illinois, located on the commuter line between Chicago and Harvard
- Dee Road station, in Cook County, Illinois, located on the commuter line between Chicago and Harvard
- Barrington station, in Cook County, Illinois, located on the commuter line between Chicago and Harvard
- Fox River Grove station, in McHenry County, Illinois, located on the commuter line between Chicago and Harvard
- Ridgefield station (Illinois), in McHenry County, Illinois, located on the commuter line between Chicago and Harvard
- Woodstock station (Illinois), in McHenry County, Illinois, located on the commuter line between Chicago and Harvard

== Iowa ==
- Algona Depot
- Ames Depot, located on the main line between Chicago and Omaha
- Beaver Depot, located on the main line between Chicago and Omaha
- Belle Plaine Depot, located on the main line between Chicago and Omaha
- Breda Depot, located on the line between Arcadia and Holstein
- Calamus Depot
- Carroll Depot
- Center Junction Depot
- Clinton Depot, located on the main line between Chicago and Omaha
- Council Bluffs Depot
- Denison Depot, located on the main line between Chicago and Omaha
- Ellsworth Depot, located on the line between Wall Lake and Tama
- Grand Junction Depot, located at the intersection of the Chicago to Omaha main line and the Minneapolis & St. Louis line.
- Harlan Depot, located on the Chicago Great Western line
- Hawarden Depot, located on the line between Eagle Grove and Iroquois
- Ida Grove Depot
- Kelsey Depot, located on the line between Belle Plaine and Wanda
- Lake City Depot, located on the line between Wall Lake and Tama
- Lake View Depot
- Lone Rock Depot
- Lowden Depot
- Mount Vernon Depot, located on the main line between Chicago and Omaha
- Onawa Depot
- Owasa Depot
- Pisgah Depot, located on the line between Loveland and Fremont
- Quarry Depot, located on the main line between Chicago and Omaha
- Ricketts Depot, located on the line between Sioux City and Carroll
- Sac City Depot, located on the line between Sioux City and Carroll.
- Stanhope Depot, located on the line between Wall Lake and Tama
- Story City Depot
- Stratford Depot
- Traer Depot, located on the line between Belle Plaine and Wanda
- Vail Depot, located on the main line between Chicago and Omaha
- Wall Lake Depot, located on the line between Sioux City and Carroll

== Michigan ==
- Antoine Depot, located on the line between Powers and Watersmeet
- Bessemer Depot, located on the line between Kimball and Watersmeet
- Connerville Depot, located on the branch line between Wakefield and Connerville
- Elmwood Depot, located on the line between Powers and Watersmeet
- Gogebic Depot, located on the line between Kimball and Watersmeet
- Hemalita Depot, located on the line between Powers and Watersmeet
- Iron Mountain Depot
- Ironwood Depot - listed on the National Register of Historic Places in Gogebic County, Michigan
- Kew Depot, located on the main line between Milwaukee and Ishpeming
- Leaper Depot, located on the line between Antoine and Escanaba
- Menominee Depot, located on the main line between Milwaukee and Ishpeming
- Norway Depot, located on the line between Powers and Watersmeet
- Oro Depot, located on the line between Antoine and Escanaba
- Panola Depot, located on the branch line between Stager and Crystal Falls
- Quinnessac Depot, located on the line between Powers and Watersmeet
- Rock Depot, located on the main line between Milwaukee and Ishpeming
- Stager Depot, located on the line between Powers and Watersmeet
- Vulcan Depot, located on the line between Powers and Watersmeet
- Wilson Depot

== Minnesota ==
- Arlington Depot, located on the Minneapolis & St Louis Line
- Butterfield Depot, located on the line between Minneapolis and Omaha
- Canby Depot
- Claremont Depot, location is on the line between Elroy and Lead
- Delhi Depot, located on the line between Blunt and Winthrop
- Elkton Depot, located on the Chicago Great Western line
- Fairmont Depot, located on the line between Belle Plaine and Wanda
- Garvin Depot, located on the line between Elroy and Lead
- Hendricks Depot, located on the line between Tyler and Astoria
- Ivanhoe Depot
- Klossner Depot, located on the Minneapolis & St Louis Line
- Lamberton Depot
- Lucan Depot - listed on the National Register of Historic Places in Redwood County, Minnesota
- Mankato Union Depot, located on the main line between Omaha and Minneapolis
- Marshall Depot - listed on the National Register of Historic Places in Lyon County, Minnesota
- Minneopa Depot
- New Ulm Depot - listed on the National Register of Historic Places in Brown County, Minnesota
- Owatonna Depot
- Porter Depot
- Revere Depot, located on the line between Elroy and Lead
- Sleepy Eye Depot - listed on the National Register of Historic Places in Brown County, Minnesota
- Tracy Depot, located in the line between Elroy and Lead
- Walnut Grove Depot
- Waseca Depot, located on the Minneapolis & St Louis main line and the line between Elroy and Lead

== Nebraska ==
- Atkinson Depot, located on the main line between Omaha and Lander
- Beemer Depot, located on the main line between Omaha and Lander
- Clearwater Depot, located on the Omaha-Lander main line
- Dakota Junction, junction on the Omaha to Lander line with the line to Bentonite
- Eli Depot, located on the main line between Omaha and Lander
- Gordon Depot, located on the main line between Omaha and Lander
- Hooper Depot, located on the Omaha-Lander main line
- Johnstown Deopt, located on the main line between Omaha and Lander
- Kilgore Depot, located on the Omaha-Lander main line
- Long Pine Depot, located on the Omaha-lander main line
- Merriman Depot, located on the line between Omaha and Lander
- Norfolk Depot, located on the main line between Omaha and Lander
- Omaha Union Station, Eastern terminus of main line to Lander, Western terminus of main line to Chicago
- Pilger Depot, located on the main line between Omaha and Lander
- Rushville Depot, located on the Omaha to Lander main line
- Tilden Depot, on the Omaha-Lander line
- Valentine Depot, on the Omaha to Lander main line
- Wahoo Depot, on the line between Fremont and Superior

== South Dakota ==
- Aberdeen Depot, located on the line between James Valley Junction and Oakes
- Alcester Depot
- Belle Fourche Depot
- Beresford Depot - listed on the National Register of Historic Places in Union County, South Dakota
- Brookings Depot - listed on the National Register of Historic Places in Brookings County, South Dakota
- Capa Depot, located on the line between Elroy and Lead
- Carthage Depot
- Castlewood Depot
- Clark Depot
- Conde Depot
- De Smet Depot, located on the line between Elroy and Lead
- Elkton Depot, located on the line between Elroy and Lead
- Fort Pierre Depot, located on the line between Elroy and Lead
- Gettysburg Depot, located on the line between Winthrop and Blunt
- Harrold Depot
- Hecla Depot
- Hot Springs Depot
- Huron Depot, located on the line between Elroy and Lead
- James Valley Junction, Junction between Elroy to Lead line and the line to Oakes
- Kampeska Depot, located on the line between Winthrop and Blunt
- Lake Preston Depot, located on the line between Elroy and Lead
- Midland Depot
- Miller Depot
- Miranda Depot
- Mission Hill Depot
- Nowlin Depot, located on the main line between Elroy and Lead
- Redfield Depot - listed on the National Register of Historic Places in Spink County, South Dakota
- Ree Heights Depot, located on the line between Elroy and Lead
- St. Onge Depot
- Sturgis Depot
- Troy Depot, located on the line between Winthrop and Blunt
- Unityville Depot, located on the line between Iroquois and Eagle Grove
- Vayland Depot
- Winner Depot, located on the branch line from Norfolk to Wood
- Wood Depot

== Wisconsin ==
- Antigo Depot
- Ashland Union Depot, located on the main line between Minneapolis and Ashland
- Baraboo Depot, located on the Chicago-Madison-Minneapolis main line
- Clintonville Depot
- Cuba City Depot
- Cudahy Depot, located on the line between Chicago and Milwaukee
- Deerbrook Depot
- Dodgeville Depot
- Eagle River Depot
- Eau Claire Depot, a demolished station located on the mainline between Wyeville and Minneapolis and the southern terminus of the line between Eau Claire and Duluth
- Eland Depot
- Elroy Depot
- Evansville Depot
- Fond du Lac Depot, located on the mainline between Milwaukee and Green Bay via Fond Du Lac and the northern terminus of the branch line between Janesville and Fond Du Lac
- Footville Depot
- Grand Marsh Depot, located on the Chicago-Milwaukee-Minneapolis main line
- Green Bay Depot, located on the main line between Milwaukee and Ishpeming
- Jefferson Depot, located on the line between Janesville and Fond Du Lac
- Kendalls Depot, located on the line between Elroy and Lead
- Kenosha Station
- Lake Geneva Depot, a demolished station in Walworth County, Wisconsin, located on the line between Crystal Lake and Williams Bay
- Lake Mills Depot
- LaRue Depot
- Lyndhurst Depot
- Madison Depot, located at the crossing between lines between Chicago and Minneapolis and Milwaukee and Lancaster
- Malone Depot
- Manitowoc Depot
- Marinette Depot
- Marion Depot
- Mattoon Depot
- Mercer Depot
- Monico Junction Depot
- Neenah Depot, located on the line between Milwaukee and Ishpeming
- New London Depot
- Niagara Depot
- Pell Lake Depot
- Plymouth Depot
- Racine Depot
- Reedsburg Depot, listed on the National Register of Historic Places in Sauk County, Wisconsin, located on the main line between Chicago and Minneapolis via Madison
- Rhinelander Depot
- Ridgeway Depot
- Rock Springs Depot
- Sheboygan Depot
- South Milwaukee Depot, located on the line between Chicago and Milwaukee
- Sparta Depot
- Sussex Depot
- Three Lakes Depot, located on the line between Monico and Watersmeet
- Tunnel City Depot, located on the line between Wyeville and LaCrosse
- Watertown Depot, listed on the National Register of Historic Places in Jefferson County, Wisconsin, located on the line between Janesville and Fond Du Lac
- Waukesha Depot, listed on the National Register of Historic Places, located on the mainline between Madison and Milwaukee
- Waunakee Depot
- Wausau Depot
- Wautoma Depot
- West Bend Depot

== Wyoming ==
- Arminto Depot located on the main line between Omaha and Lander
- Big Muddy Depot located on the main line between Omaha and Lander
- Casper Depot located on the main line between Omaha and Lander, since abandoned west of Casper
- Douglas Depot located on the main line between Omaha and Lander
- Glenrock Depot located on the main line between Omaha and Lander
- Lusk Depot located on the main line between Omaha and Lander
- Manville Depot located on the main line between Omaha and Lander
- Powder River Depot, listed on the National Register of Historic Places in Natrona County, Wyoming
- Riverton Depot, located on the main line between Omaha and Lander, since abandoned through Riverton
- Shawnee Depot located on the main line between Omaha and Lander
