= National Register of Historic Places listings in Spink County, South Dakota =

Location of Spink County in South Dakota

This is a list of the National Register of Historic Places listings in Spink County, South Dakota.

This is intended to be a complete list of the properties and districts on the National Register of Historic Places in Spink County, South Dakota, United States. The locations of National Register properties and districts for which the latitude and longitude coordinates are included below, may be seen in a map.

There are 29 properties and districts listed on the National Register in the county. Two previously listed sites have been removed.

This National Park Service list is complete through NPS recent listings posted December 19, 2025.

== Current listings ==
	Name on the Register	Image	Date listed	Location	City or town	Description
1	William F. Bruell House	William F. Bruell House	October 12, 2000 (#00001222)	Address Restricted	Redfield	Queen Anne-style house built in 1902, designed by Sedgwick & Saxton.
2	Chicago and Northwestern Depot	Chicago and Northwestern Depot	November 21, 1980 (#80003732)	U.S. Route 212; 44°52′30″N 98°31′19″W	Redfield	
3	Conde Municipal Building		January 19, 2024 (#100009811)	160 2nd Street NE; 45°09′26″N 98°05′49″W	Conde	
4	Doland Commercial Historic District		November 18, 2019 (#100004622)	Humphrey Dr. to 2nd St. 44°53′43″N 98°06′06″W	Doland	
5	First Congregational Church		September 14, 1979 (#79002407)	Oak and 2nd Sts. 45°03′01″N 98°05′46″W	Turton	
6	Harlow Farmstead		February 26, 1982 (#82003940)	Southwest of Turton; 44°57′20″N 98°13′40″W	Frankfort	
7	Markham Farmstead		September 13, 1990 (#90000958)	Junction of County Roads 4 and 7; 45°12′01″N 98°12′30″W	Conde	
8	Norbeck-Nicholson Carriage House		January 21, 2015 (#14001190)	910 E. 2nd St. 44°52′24″N 98°30′55″W	Redfield	
9	Old Spink Colony		June 30, 1982 (#82003941)	On the James River; 44°44′49″N 98°17′35″W	Frankfort	
10	Edbert and Josie Opitz House	Edbert and Josie Opitz House	December 2, 1998 (#98001408)	204 E. 2nd St. 44°52′50″N 98°30′54″W	Redfield	
11	Redfield Carnegie Library	Redfield Carnegie Library	February 17, 1978 (#78002568)	5 E. 5th Ave. 44°52′34″N 98°31′19″W	Redfield	
12	Old Redfield City Hall	Old Redfield City Hall	February 21, 1997 (#97000146)	517 N. Main St. 44°52′07″N 98°30′32″W	Redfield	
13	Redfield Light Plant and Fire Station		March 21, 1978 (#78002569)	614 1st St., E. 44°52′35″N 98°31′01″W	Redfield	
14	Salem Church		September 3, 1997 (#97001107)	205 Ohio St. 44°44′13″N 98°30′27″W	Tulare	
15	Site 39SP2	Site 39SP2	February 1, 1984 (#84003408)	Address Restricted	Frankfort	
16	Site 39SP4	Site 39SP4	June 8, 2005 (#05000590)	Address Restricted	Tulare	
17	Site 39SP12	Site 39SP12	February 1, 1984 (#84003403)	Address Restricted	Ashton	
18	Site 39SP19	Site 39SP19	February 1, 1984 (#84003405)	Address Restricted	Spink Colony	
19	Site 39SP37	Site 39SP37	February 1, 1984 (#84003411)	Address Restricted	Crandon	
20	Site 39SP46	Site 39SP46	February 1, 1984 (#84003413)	Address Restricted	Crandon	
21	South Dakota Dept. of Transportation Bridge No. 58-010-376		December 9, 1993 (#93001313)	Local road over Wolf Creek; 44°41′54″N 98°41′11″W	Tulare	Bridge replaced between 2009 and 2011
22	South Dakota Dept. of Transportation Bridge No. 58-021-400		December 9, 1993 (#93001314)	Local road over Turtle Creek; 44°39′46″N 98°39′51″W	Tulare	Bridge replaced between 2010 and 2012
23	South Dakota Dept. of Transportation Bridge No. 58-025-370		December 9, 1993 (#93001315)	Local road over Turtle Creek; 44°42′24″N 98°39′19″W	Tulare	
24	South Dakota Dept. of Transportation Bridge No. 58-062-270		December 9, 1993 (#93001316)	Local road over Turtle Creek; 44°51′02″N 98°34′54″W	Redfield	
25	South Dakota Dept. of Transportation Bridge No. 58-120-231		December 9, 1993 (#93001318)	Local road over the James River; 45°54′38″N 98°28′19″W	Redfield	
26	South Dakota Dept. of Transportation Bridge No. 58-140-224		December 9, 1993 (#93001319)	Local road over the James River; 44°55′13″N 98°25′54″W	Redfield	
27	South Dakota Dept. of Transportation Bridge No. 58-218-360		December 9, 1993 (#93001320)	Local road over the James River; 44°43′11″N 98°15′59″W	Frankfort	
28	Spink County Courthouse	Spink County Courthouse	November 8, 2001 (#01001219)	210 E. 7th Ave. 44°52′31″N 98°30′51″W	Redfield	
29	Turton Jail		January 17, 2024 (#100009862)	350 feet west/northwest of the intersection of Ash and Front Streets; 45°02′54″N 98°05′52″W	Turton	

== Formerly listed ==
	Name on the Register	Image	Date listed	Date removed	Location	City or town	Description
1	Ashton Methodist Church		June 17, 1982 (#82003939)	July 17, 2009	Northeastern corner of 2nd Ave. and 2nd St. 44°59′39″N 98°29′55″W	Ashton	
2	Hall Bridge		December 9, 1993 (#93001317)	March 16, 2008	Local road over Snake Creek	Ashton	
3	James Norwood Round Barn		January 3, 1978 (#78002567)	June 26, 1989	SE of Ashton on Snake Creek	Ashton vicinity	

== See also ==
- List of National Historic Landmarks in South Dakota
- National Register of Historic Places listings in South Dakota
