= Mankato Transit System =

- Founded: 2006 formerly Mankato Heartland Express
- Headquarters: 501 S Victory Dr
- Locale: Mankato, Minnesota
- Service area: Blue Earth and Nicollet Counties
- Service type: bus service, paratransit
- Routes: 17
- Stops: 93
- Hubs: 2
- Fleet: 20
- Website: City Bus

The Mankato Transit System is the primary provider of mass transportation in Mankato and North Mankato, Minnesota. 7 standard weekday and 2 standard Saturday local routes are provided, plus 8 lines affiliated with Minnesota State University, Mankato.

== Fares and passes ==
- $1.50 - Cash fare
- $10.00 - 8 tokens
- $20.00 - 16 tokens
- $40.00 - 30-day Frequent Rider Bus Pass
- $0.50 - U-Zone
- Free - Youth Fare (age zero to high school student)*
- Free - Transfers
- MavCARD - Minnesota State Mankato students, faculty and staff
- $0.75 - Seniors 60 or older
- $0.75 - Person with disabilities
- $0.75 - Medicare Card Holder
- Free - Veteran with VA card indicating service connected disability

== Route list ==
- Route 1A North: Monday through Thursday, every 20 minutes.
- Route 1A South: Monday through Thursday, every 30 minutes. Temporarily discontinued until further notice.
- Route 1B North: Monday through Friday, every 30 minutes. Temporarily discontinued until further notice.
- Route 1B South: Monday through Thursday, every 30 minutes.
- Campus Express: Monday through Thursday, every 30 minutes, evenings.
- Campus Express: Friday, every 30 minutes.
- Late Night Express: Late Night Express bus service will be temporarily discontinued beginning Friday, November 13 until further notice.
- Route 23 - Eagle Lake Express: Eagle Lake Express will be discontinued beginning Sunday, May 3

Monday-Thursday
Route 1A North: Minnesota State University - Mankato, College Station, Live Active Apartments
Route 1A South: Minnesota State University - Mankato, Parking Lots 20-23, The Quarters, Heron Dr
Route 1B South: Minnesota State University - Mankato, Parking Lots 20-23, Tanager Rd, The Quarters, Heron Dr
Route 12: Minnesota State University - Mankato, Southwood Terrace Apartments, James Ave, The Summit Apartments, Stadium Heights Residence Community, Monks Ave
Campus Express Monday through Thursday Nighttime Wigley, McElroy Shelter, Live Active Apartments, Fire Station 3, The Quarters, Heron Dr, Parking Lots 20-23

Monday-Friday
Route 1B North: Minnesota State University - Mankato, Stadium Heights Residence Community, College Station, Live Active Apartments, Myers Field House
Route 2: Cherry St, Lincoln Community Center, James Ave, Southwood Terrace Apartments, Minnesota State University - Mankato
Route 3: Cherry St, N 4th St, Adams St, Mayo Clinic Health System - Mankato, Walmart, River Hills Mall, VA Clinic, Orness Plaza, Madison East Center
Route 5 - North Mankato: Cherry St, YMCA, Belgrade Ave, Taylor Library, Colony Ct, South Central College, Benson Park, Dakota Meadows Jr High School, Range St
Route 6: Minnesota State University - Mankato, Balcerzak Dr, Live Active Apartments, Fire Station 3, Open Door Health Clinic, Walmart, Blue Earth County Justice Center, River Hills Mall
Route 7: Minnesota State University - Mankato, S Front St, Old Town, Cherry St
Route 8 - Parking Lot Shuttle: Minnesota State University - Mankato, The Summit Apartments, Parking Lots 20-23
Route 9 - Morning Express: Minnesota State University - Mankato, Stadium Heights Residence Community, Monks Ave
Route 13: Cherry St, Bethany Lutheran College, Mayo Clinic Health System - Mankato, Madison East Center, Orness Plaza, Adams St, VA Clinic, Wickersham Health Campus, Community Bank

Monday-Saturday
Stomper Express: Minnesota State University - Mankato, Stadium Heights Residence Community, The Summit Apartments, Live Active Apartments, Walmart, Old Navy, HyVee, River Hills Mall, Hilltop Apartments

Friday
Campus Express: Minnesota State University - Mankato, Live Active Apartments, Meadow View Apartments, The Quarters, Heron Dr, Parking Lots 20-23

Saturday
Route 10: Cherry St, Minnesota State University - Mankato, Live Active Apartments, Walmart, River Hills Mall, Orness Plaza, Mayo Clinic Health System - Mankato, N 4th St
Route 11: Cherry St, N 4th St, Mayo Clinic Health System - Mankato, Orness Plaza, River Hills Mall, Walmart, Live Active Apartments, Minnesota State University - Mankato

Sunday
Sunday Route 10: Cherry St, Minnesota State University - Mankato, Live Active Apartments, Walmart, River Hills Mall, Orness Plaza, Mayo Clinic Health System - Mankato, N 4th St

== Fixed route ridership ==
The ridership and service statistics shown here are of fixed route services only and do not include demand response. Per capita statistics are based on the Mankato urbanized area as reported in NTD data.

	Ridership	Change	Ridership per capita
2013	662,809	n/a	11.51
2014	734,836	▲10.87%	12.76
2015	745,427	▲1.44%	12.95
2016	747,863	▲0.33%	12.99
2017	677,554	▼9.4%	11.77
2018	668,349	▼1.36%	11.61
2019	663,353	▼0.75%	11.52
2020	293,625	▼55.74%	5.1
2021	244,337	▼16.79%	4.24

== See also ==
- List of bus transit systems in the United States
- Mankato Union Depot
