= Redfield College (South Dakota) =

Coordinates: 44.8717°N 98.5200°W

Redfield College was an institution of higher learning located in Redfield, South Dakota, United States. The college was sponsored by the "Northern Association of Congregational Churches," an alliance of Congregational groups in the north-central area of South Dakota. Redfield College opened in September 1887 (138 years ago) and graduated its first class in 1894.

== History ==
The first Redfield College classes were held in the town's Congregational Church, but the school soon purchased an old hotel building located in a nearby town, and moved the structure to Redfield to house the college. That building partially burned in 1896, and was reconstructed at a cost of $25,000. Ultimately the campus included two major buildings—a main building which included a library, kitchen, reading room and dormitory; and a gymnasium which also included laboratory, music, and classroom space. A nearby boarding house provided accommodations for female students.

Redfield College offered both high school and college classes, and in addition to an academic curriculum offered classes in teacher training, business, music, and theology. By 1904 the school had an enrollment of 166 students. One of them was Grace Ingalls, the youngest sister of author Laura Ingalls Wilder (Little House on the Prairie).

The school later encountered financial difficulties, however, and by 1928 its future was threatened. A $50,000 fundraising program was announced that year, but the effort proved futile, and the school was permanently closed in 1932 (94 years ago). Redfield's theology program was transferred to Yankton College. In 1934, the school's campus was converted into a home for elderly and indigent members of the Order of the Eastern Star, and the buildings served in that capacity until 1975. Eventually, the structures were razed.

College records (correspondence) from 1913 to 1933 are held by the South Dakota Conference of the United Church of Christ Archives at Augustana University in Sioux Falls.
