= Redfield Light Plant and Fire Station =

- U.S. National Register of Historic Places
- Location within South Dakota Location within the United States
- Location: 614 1st St., E, Redfield, South Dakota
- Coordinates: 44°52′35″N 98°31′01″W
- Area: 1 acre (0.40 ha)
- Built: 1900
- NRHP reference No.: 78002569
- Added to NRHP: March 21, 1978

The Redfield Light Plant and Fire Station, or Redfield Fire Station, at 614 1st St., E, in Redfield, South Dakota, was built in 1900. It was listed on the National Register of Historic Places in 1978.

The listing included the one-story brick-faced fire station and a five-story fire drill tower.
