= Neenah station =

Historic railroad station in Wisconsin, U.S.

Neenah
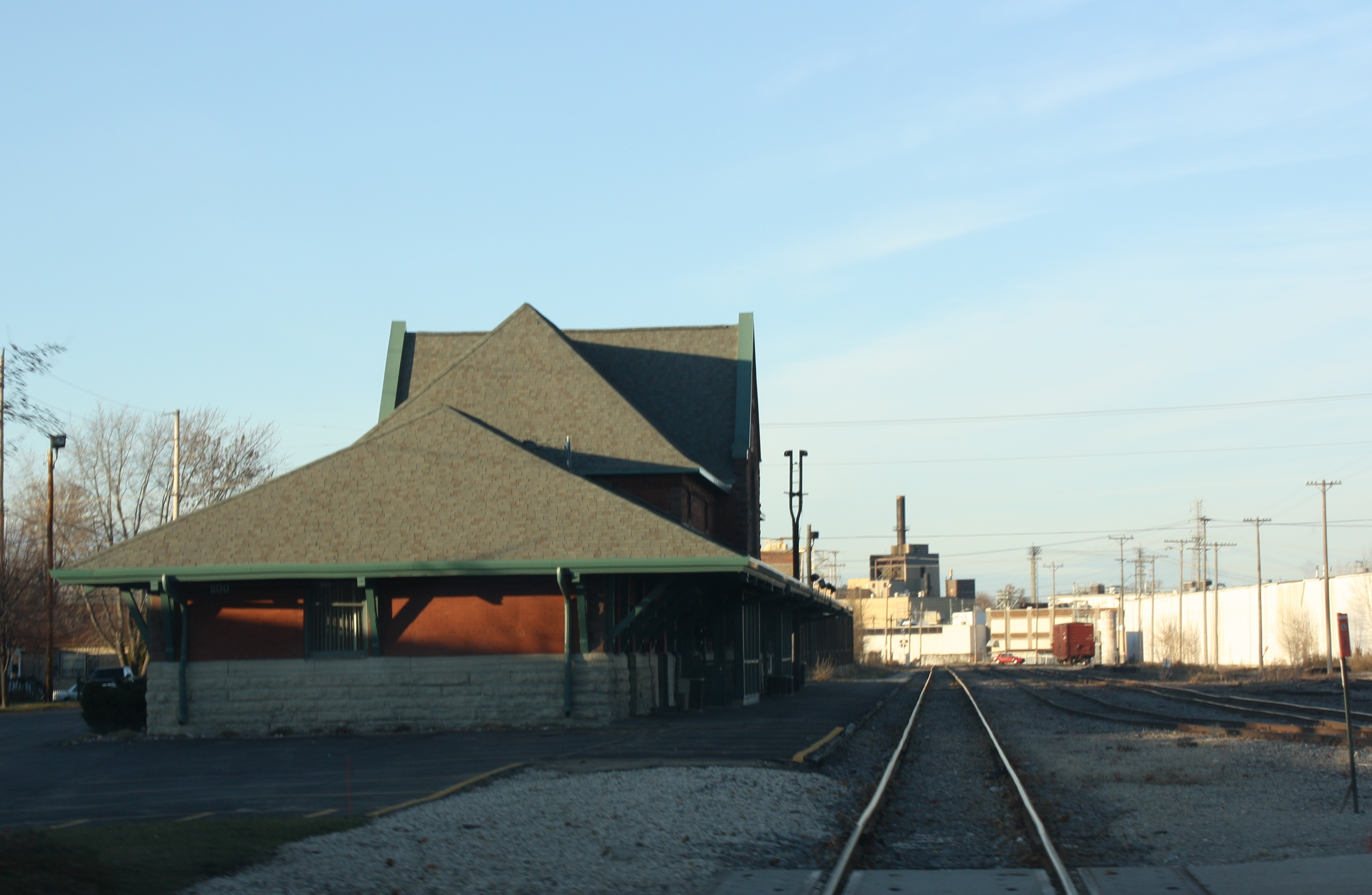
- The depot in 2009

General information
- Location: 500 N. Commercial St., Neenah, Wisconsin
- Coordinates: 44°11′35″N 88°27′23″W
- System: Former Chicago and North Western Railway station

History
- Opened: 1892
- Closed: 1971 (passenger); 1982 (freight)

Services
Preceding station	Chicago and North Western Railway	Following station
Menasha toward Ishpeming	Ishpeming – Milwaukee	Winnebago toward Milwaukee
Services at Sherry Street Station
Preceding station	Soo Line	Following station
Dale toward Portal	Main Line	Winnebago toward Chicago
- Chicago and Northwestern Railroad Depot
- U.S. National Register of Historic Places
- Location within Wisconsin Location within the United States
- Coordinates: 44°11′35″N 88°27′23″W
- Area: 1 acre (0.40 ha)
- Built: 1892
- Architect: Charles Sumner Frost
- Architectural style: Richardsonian Romanesque Revival
- NRHP reference No.: 94000134
- Added to NRHP: March 7, 1994
Location

The Neenah station, otherwise known as the Neenah-Menasha station or Chicago and Northwestern Railroad Depot is a historic railroad station located at 500 N. Commercial Street in Neenah, Wisconsin. The station was built in 1892 for the Chicago and North Western Railway. The depot was designed by Charles Sumner Frost in the Richardsonian Romanesque style. Passenger service on the line was ceased in 1971.

The depot was added to the National Register of Historic Places on March 7, 1994.

== Named trains ==
In 1962, the Neenah station served three daily trains northbound (four on Sunday) to Green Bay and beyond to Ishpeming, MI, as well as three daily trains southbound to Chicago. These included:

- Commuter 400
- Flambeau 400
- Green Bay 400
- Northwoods Fisherman
- Peninsula 400
- Valley 400

== Other stations in Neenah ==
The Soo Line Railroad also served Neenah. Passenger train service to the Soo Line station ended on January 15, 1965, when the Soo Line Laker between Chicago and the Twin Cities was discontinued.

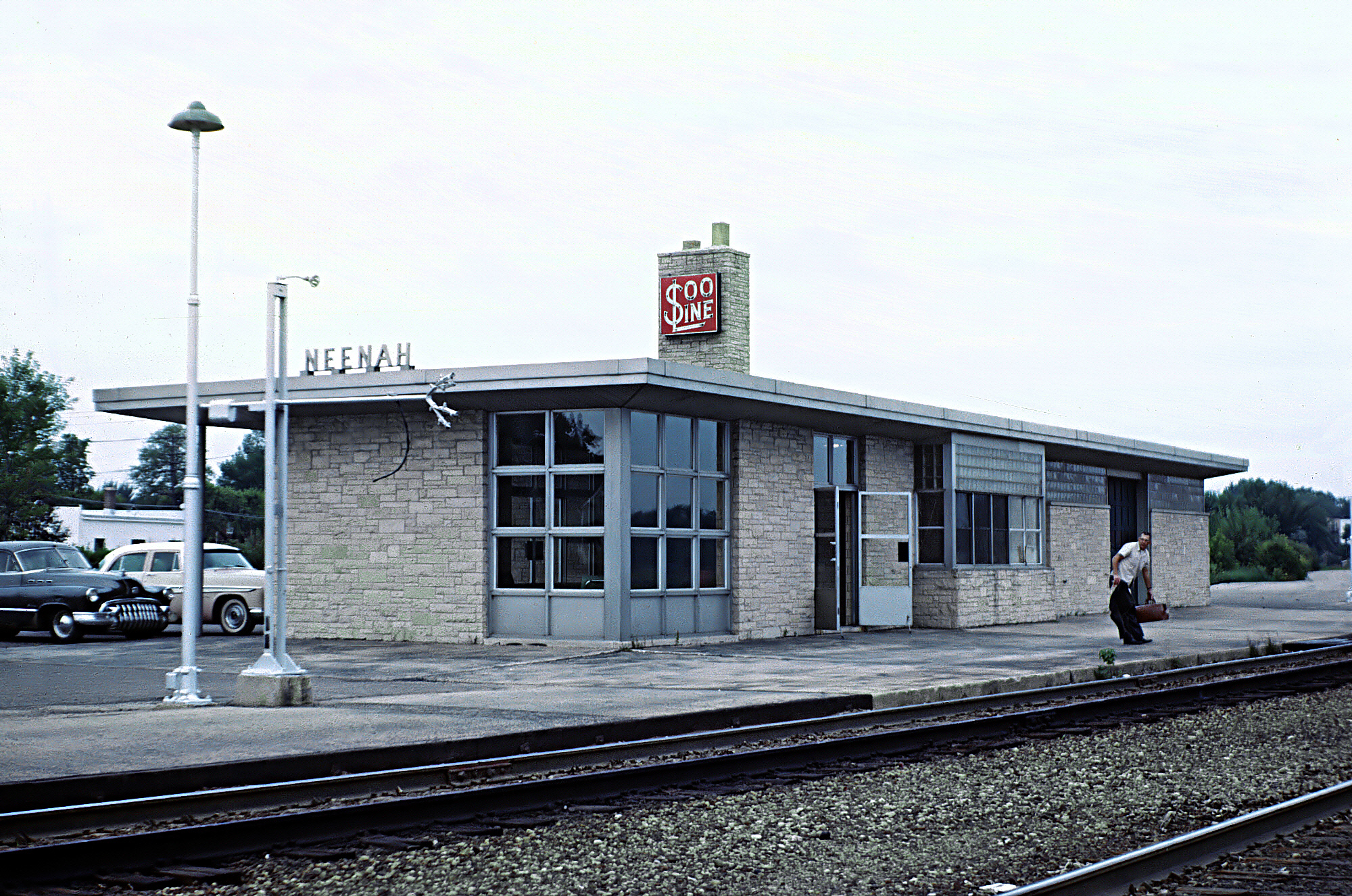
The Soo Line depot in 1963
