= Salem Church (Tulare, South Dakota) =

Historic church in South Dakota, United States

- U.S. National Register of Historic Places
- Location within South Dakota Location within the United States
- Nearest city: Tulare, South Dakota
- Coordinates: 44°44′13″N 98°30′27″W
- Area: less than one acre
- Built: 1911
- Architectural style: Late Gothic Revival
- NRHP reference No.: 97001107
- Added to NRHP: September 3, 1997

The Salem Church, at 208 Ohio Street in Tulare, South Dakota, is a historic church. It was built in 1911 and was added to the National Register in 1997.

It is Late Gothic Revival in style.

It is a one-story wood frame building which is 44 by 28 feet (13.4 m × 8.5 m) in plan. It has a tall centered bell tower with a steeple above the main entrance. It was deemed "a good example of a first-generation church in rural South Dakota, constructed in the vernacular Gothic Revival tradition."
