= Beda Cornwall =

Beda Cornwall (November 21, 1907 – June 13, 1994) was an American librarian who was instrumental in the development of public libraries in Las Vegas, Nevada.

== Early life and education ==
Born in Tulare, South Dakota, to Frederick William and Martha Brennecke, Cornwall was educated at University of Idaho, Southern Branch, at Pocatello and at the University of Denver where she majored in education and social services.

== Career ==
From 1935 to 1939, she worked under a federal appointment to do social work for the Farm Security Administration.

They moved to Las Vegas in 1943, where Charles served as City Attorney until 1948. Beda taught at Dry Lake and served on the Las Vegas City Recreation Board and was appointed through that group and the City Commission to start a group of interested local people to help raise funds for an adequate library to serve the city of Las Vegas.

She helped to form of the Citizens' Library Association, which in 1948 launched a fund-raising drive to raise money for a library building. The group raised $68,206 through public subscriptions, and the city of Las Vegas donated an additional $30,000. The city donated the land at the corner of 4th and Mesquite in downtown Las Vegas. On June 1, 1952, the new library was dedicated and was the largest and most modern library in the state of Nevada.

In 1952, Cornwall was also chair of National Library Week and was honored by the American Library Association for her contributions to public library service. She continued to serve on the Citizen's Library Association Board until 1972, when the Las Vegas Public Library merged with the Clark County Library District. Cornwall served as president of the Service League (1950, 1951), chair of the Clark County Social Agencies, chair of the Clark County Safety Council, and campaign chair for the Community Chest. Also in 1952, Cornwall was named Mrs. Las Vegas by the American Legion for her work in the community and was recognized as one of the three Outstanding Women of the Year by the Soroptomists. The Hadassah Club of Jewish women also presented her an award of merit for outstanding service to the community. In 1954, Cornwall was elected to the Las Vegas City School District Board of Trustees and served until 1956.

In 1978, the University of Nevada, Las Vegas Library sponsored a special exhibit of artifacts, photographs, papers, etc. that illustrated the history of public library creation in Las Vegas. Cornwell remained an ardent library supporter and community worker until her death on June 13, 1994.

She was also a teacher in Montrose, Colorado, for four years.

== Personal life ==
Cornwall married Charles Cornwall in 1932, and together they had two children, Frederick William Cornwall and Martha Brennecke Cornwall.
