= Redfield Carnegie Library =

- U.S. National Register of Historic Places
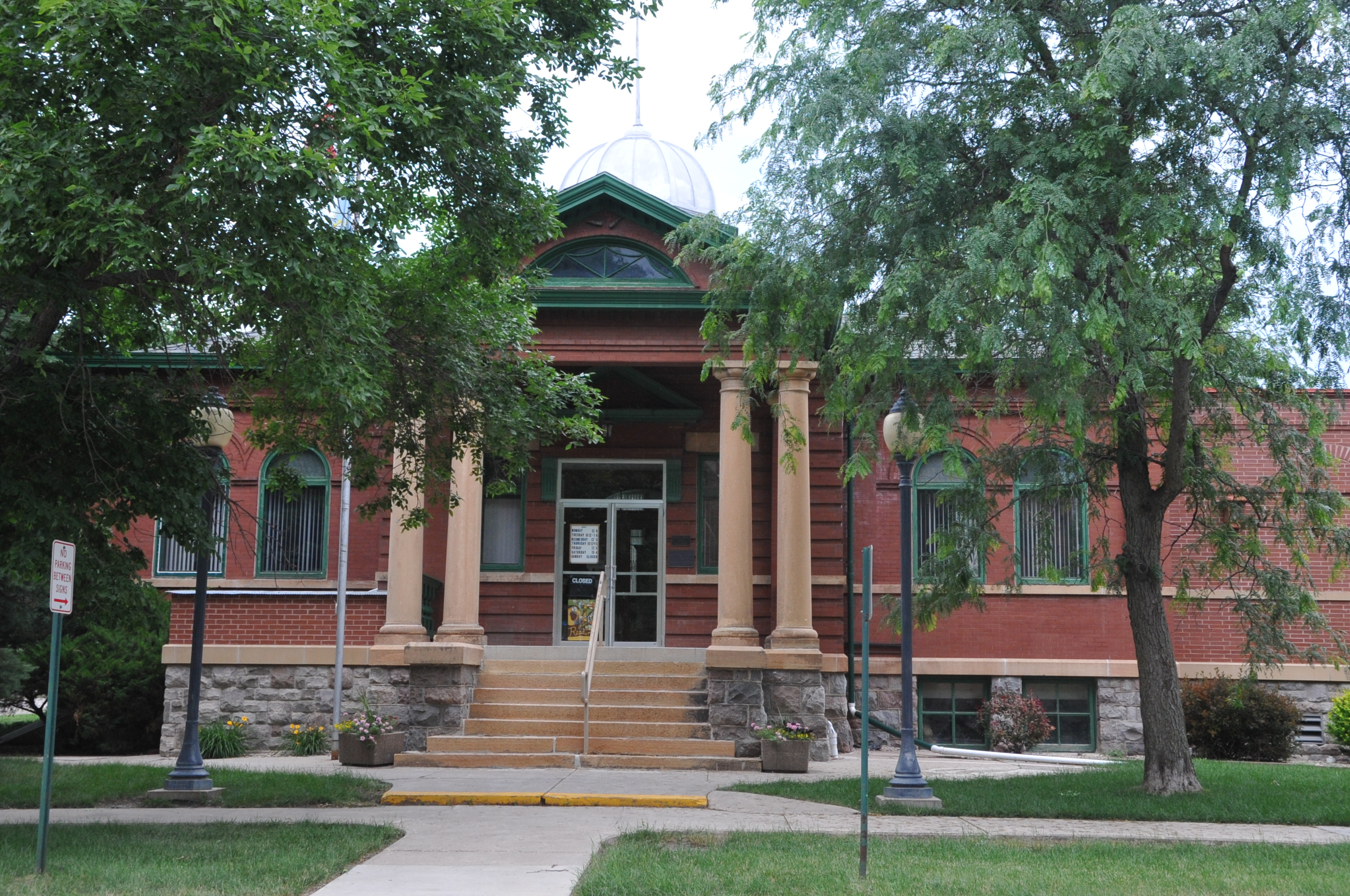

- Location within South Dakota Location within the United States
- Location: 5 E. 5th Ave., Redfield, South Dakota
- Coordinates: 44°52′34″N 98°31′19″W
- Area: less than one acre
- Built: 1902
- Architectural style: Romanesque
- NRHP reference No.: 78002568
- Added to NRHP: February 17, 1978

The Redfield Carnegie Library in Redfield, South Dakota is a building from 1902. It was listed on the National Register of Historic Places in 1978.

It is a one-story building with a red brick facing above an ashlar-faced foundation. It has a portico with pilasters and paired Doric columns supporting a pediment.

The library was funded by a $10,000 Carnegie library grant.
