= Donald Driver =

American football player (born 1975)

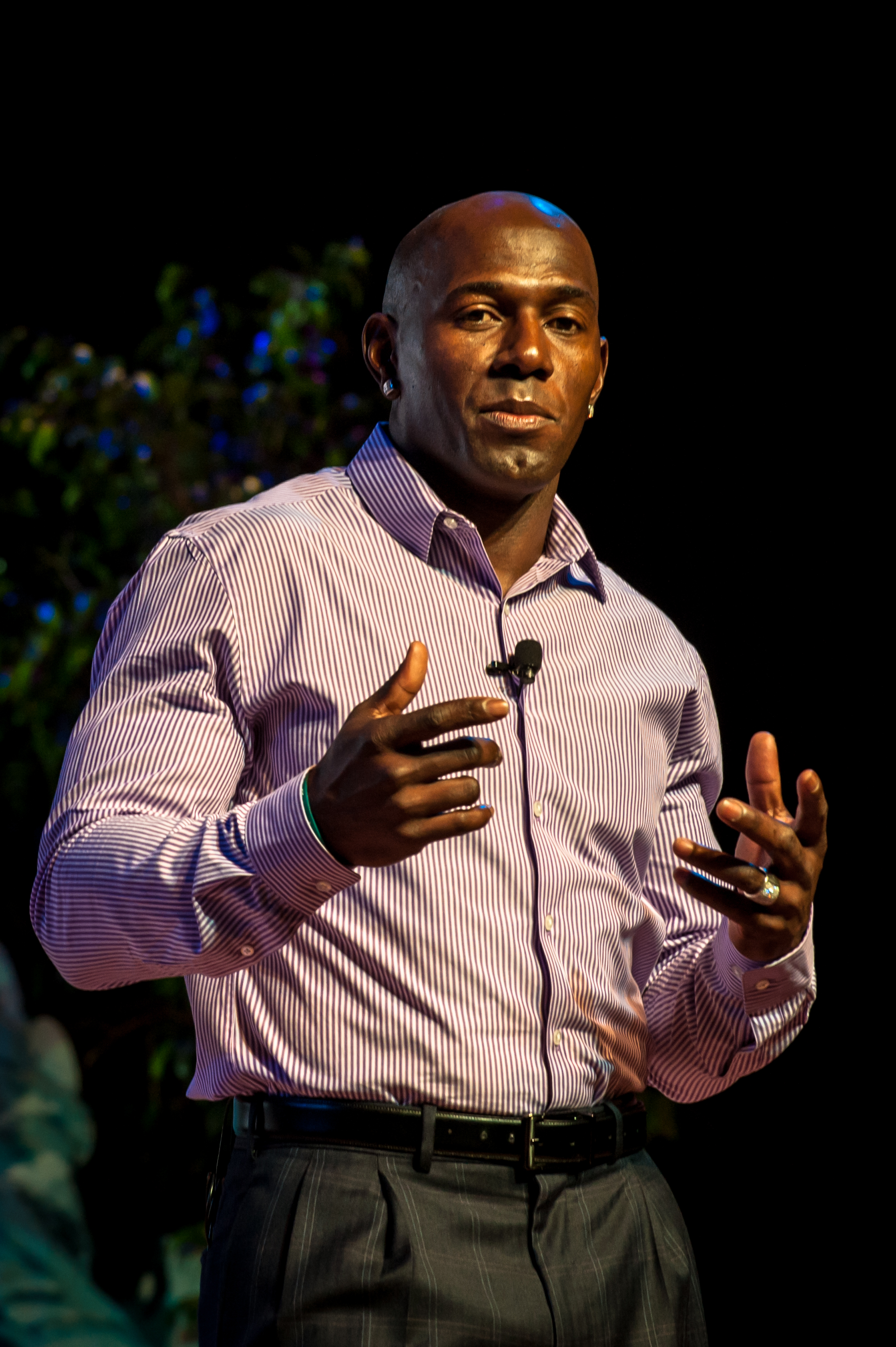
- Driver in 2014

No. 80
- Position: Wide receiver

Personal information
- Born: February 2, 1975 (age 51); Houston, Texas, U.S.
- Listed height: 6 ft 0 in (1.83 m)
- Listed weight: 194 lb (88 kg)

Career information
- High school: Milby (Houston)
- College: Alcorn State (1995–1998)
- NFL draft: 1999: 7th round, 213th overall pick

Career history
- Green Bay Packers (1999–2012)

Awards and highlights
- Super Bowl champion (XLV); 4× Pro Bowl (2002, 2006, 2007, 2010); Green Bay Packers Hall of Fame

Career NFL statistics
- Receptions: 743
- Receiving yards: 10,137
- Receiving touchdowns: 61
- Stats at Pro Football Reference

Donald Jerome Driver (born February 2, 1975) is an American former professional football wide receiver who played for the Green Bay Packers of the National Football League (NFL). After playing college football for Alcorn State University, Driver was picked by Green Bay in the seventh round of the 1999 NFL draft. He spent his entire 14-season NFL career with the Packers and holds the franchise's all-time records for most career receptions and receiving yards. Driver was a member of the Packers team that won Super Bowl XLV. Every year in Cleveland, Driver holds the Donald Driver Football Camp for local kids which is held at the Cleveland High School Football field. Upon retirement, he won season 14 of Dancing with the Stars.

== Early life ==
Driver was born in Houston, Texas, on February 2, 1975. He was the middle child of five siblings. Driver's parents, Marvin Driver Jr. and Faye Gray, divorced when he was just a young boy. Donald had a tough childhood living out of a U-Haul truck for a period of time during his early teens, after a collection agency confiscated his family's possessions. Donald spent multiple nights in motel rooms that his mother had purchased with food stamps. Driver and his older brother, Marvin III, began stealing cars and selling drugs during their teenage years in order to make it from day to day. Driver was quoted by USA Today stating, "You try to do anything you can to provide for your family." At 14, Driver moved in with his grandmother, Betty Lofton, and his life started to turn around.

Driver shined as an athlete early in his years at Milby High School in Houston. He lettered four times each in track, football, basketball and baseball. He was a Texas All-State honorable mention in football, where he played at the wide receiver, defensive back and kickoff return positions.

== College career ==
Driver attended Alcorn State University in Mississippi, where he lettered in both football and track & field. He finished his college football career at Alcorn State with 88 receptions for 1993 yards (19.69 yards per catch). He was a five-time "Athlete of the Year" in his conference for his track and football prowess.

Driver is a member of Alpha Phi Alpha fraternity.

=== Track and field ===
Driver is a decorated track athlete. He is an Olympic-class high jumper, being able to jump 7 ft 6.5 in (2.30 m). He qualified for the 1996 Olympic Field Trials in the high jump.

He competed for the Alcorn State Braves track team, where he excelled in the high jump and earned all-conference honors his senior year. He leaped 2.30 meters in the high jump, 15.62 meters in the triple jump and 7.75 meters in the long jump.

== Professional career ==
Driver was selected by the Green Bay Packers in the seventh round of the 1999 NFL draft with the 213th overall pick. He spent his entire career with the Packers.

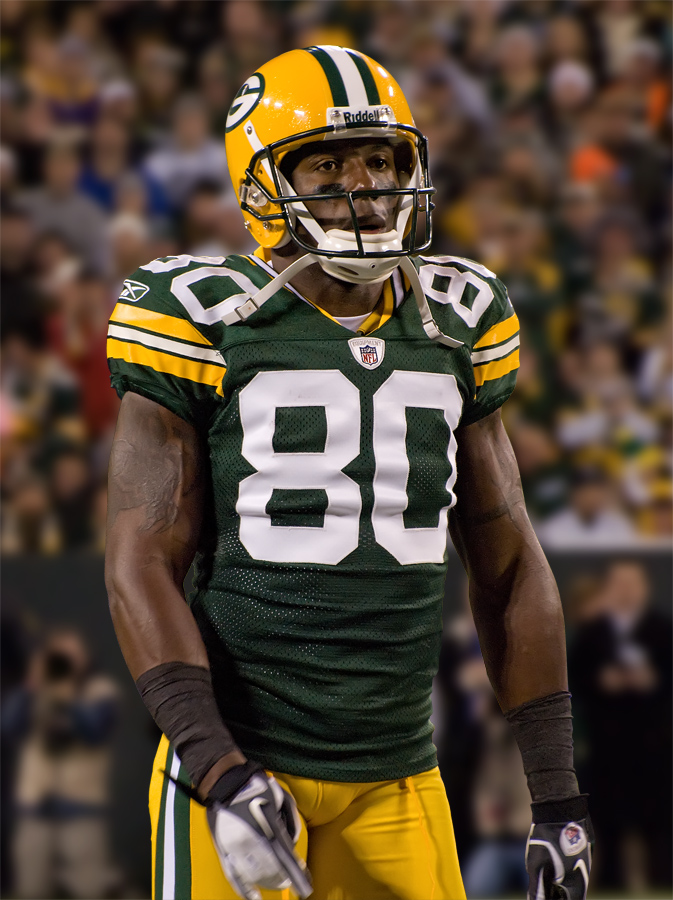
Donald Driver in a game against the Minnesota Vikings on November 14, 2011.

Known as one of the most consistent wide receivers in the game, Driver was not particularly productive his first three seasons in Green Bay (1999–2001), as he remained behind wide receivers Antonio Freeman and Corey Bradford on the depth chart. With the departure of Freeman and Bradford, Driver blossomed in a starting role.

Driver was solid throughout his career, often posting 1,000 receiving yards in a season. Driver had the most catches in the NFL in the middle of the field in 2006. He set a career high for single-game yards on November 12, 2006, when he caught six passes for 191 yards, including an 82-yard touchdown against the Minnesota Vikings. Driver finished the 2006 season in the top five of the league in reception yardage with 1,295 yards. He also recorded the most receptions in his career with 92, earning a spot in the 2007 Pro Bowl. On December 16, 2007, during a 33–14 victory over the St. Louis Rams, veteran Green Bay quarterback Brett Favre broke Dan Marino's all-time record of 61,361 career passing yards. The new record came on a seven-yard completion to Driver. Driver was selected for the 2008 Pro Bowl.

In the NFC Championship game on January 20, 2008, against the New York Giants, Driver had the longest play in the Packers' playoff history, with a 90-yard touchdown catch from Favre.

On October 18, 2009, Driver became the Green Bay Packers' all-time leading receiver in receptions, with 596. He went on to catch six more balls for 107 yards in a 26–0 home victory over the Detroit Lions. On September 8, 2011, Driver caught four balls for 41 yards in the opening game against the New Orleans Saints and was only one yard short of becoming the Packers' all-time leader in receiving yards. Driver finally broke the Packers' all-time receiving yardage record on September 18, 2011, against the Carolina Panthers after he caught a 10-yard pass from Aaron Rodgers, surpassing James Lofton.

On February 6, 2011, Driver was injured on his second reception of Super Bowl XLV. Out with an ankle sprain, Driver returned for the game's final plays, as the Packers defeated the Pittsburgh Steelers 31–25. Driver finished Super Bowl XLV with two receptions for 28 yards. Despite losing playing time to Greg Jennings and Jordy Nelson, Driver was a veteran presence for a young Packers receiving corps led by NFL MVP quarrterback Aaron Rodgers in the twilight of Driver's career.

=== Retirement ===
On January 31, 2013, Driver announced his retirement on ESPN2 Mike and Mike in the Morning after spending his entire 14-season career with the Packers. He missed only eight games in his career outside of his rookie season, the last one being November 18, 2012.

On February 6, 2013, the Packers hosted a public retirement ceremony for Driver. This was the first public retirement ceremony held for a Packers player. It was hosted in the Lambeau Field Atrium with comments made by Mark Murphy, Ted Thompson, Mike McCarthy, and Driver. The event sold out in 14 minutes and hundreds of fans were in attendance. The mayor of Green Bay presented Driver with a key to the city, announcing that the receiver statue in downtown Green Bay would be refurbished to wear a No. 80 Driver jersey. The street leading to the statue was also renamed "Donald Driver Way."

On July 22, 2017, Driver was inducted into the Green Bay Packers Hall of Fame.

== NFL career statistics ==
Legend
	Won the Super Bowl
**Bold**	Career high

=== Regular season ===
Year	Team	GP	Receiving				
Year	Team	GP	Rec	Yds	Avg	Lng	TD
1999	GB	6	3	31	10.3	12	1
2000	GB	16	21	322	**15.3**	49	1
2001	GB	13	13	167	12.8	37	1
2002	GB	16	70	1,064	15.2	**85**	**9**
2003	GB	15	52	621	11.9	41	2
2004	GB	16	84	1,208	14.4	50	**9**
2005	GB	16	86	1,221	14.2	59	5
2006	GB	16	**92**	**1,295**	14.1	82	8
2007	GB	16	82	1,048	12.8	47	2
2008	GB	16	74	1,012	13.7	71	5
2009	GB	16	70	1,061	15.2	71	6
2010	GB	15	51	565	11.1	61	4
2011	GB	16	37	445	12.0	35	6
2012	GB	13	8	77	9.6	26	2
Career		205	743	10,137	13.6	85	61

=== Postseason ===
Year	Team	GP	Receiving				
Year	Team	GP	Rec	Yds	Avg	Lng	TD
2001	GB	2	2	26	13.0	14	0
2002	GB	1	3	64	21.3	25	1
2003	GB	2	8	91	11.4	23	0
2004	GB	1	7	78	11.1	16	0
2007	GB	2	8	159	19.9	90	1
2009	GB	1	4	43	10.8	28	0
2010	GB	4	14	169	12.1	24	0
2011	GB	1	3	45	15.0	16	1
Career		14	49	675	13.8	90	3

== Personal life ==
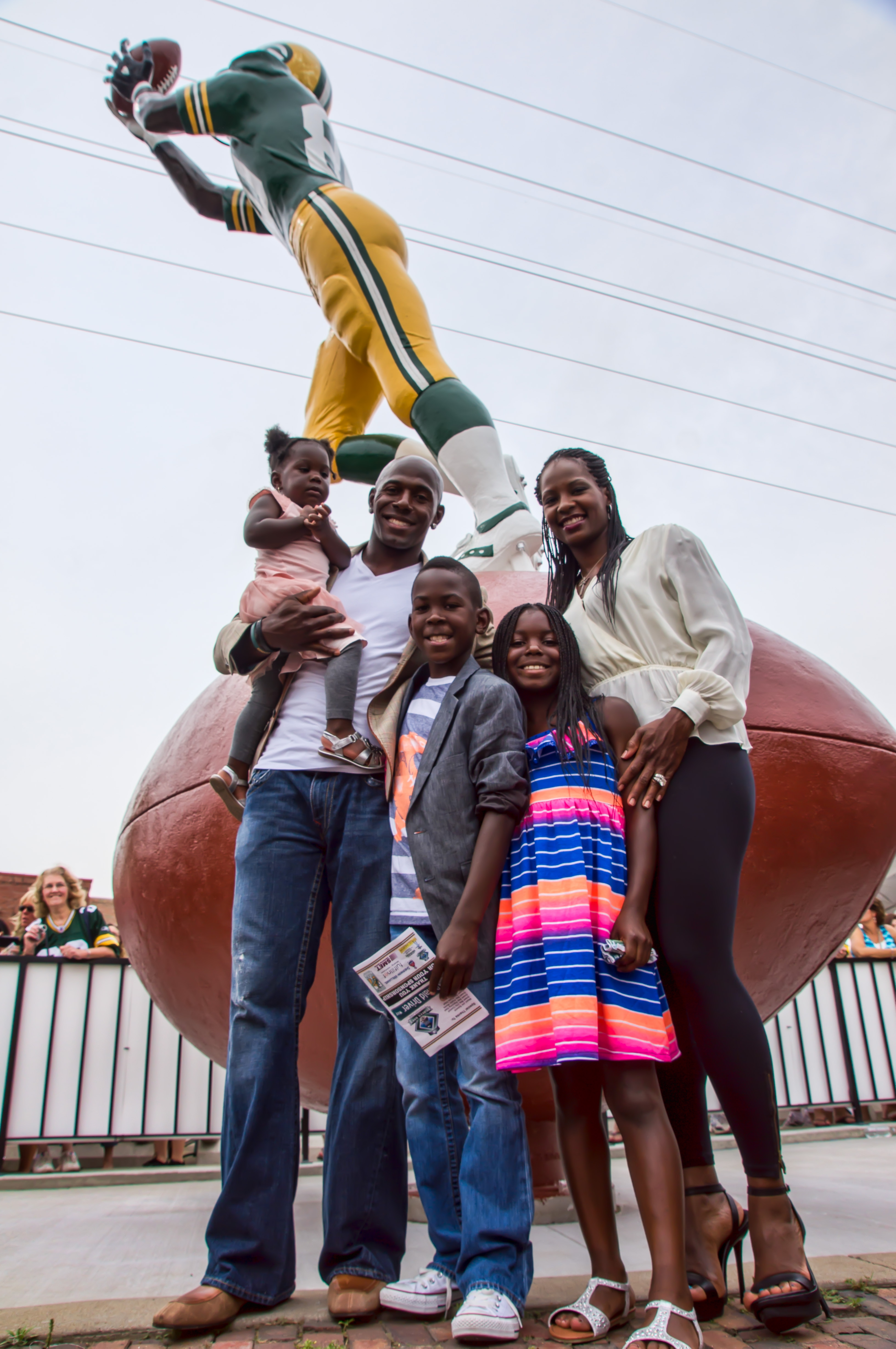
Driver and family pose in front of the statue dedicated in his honor.

Driver is married to Betina Driver. They have three children: Cristian, Christina, and Charity. His son Cristian is a wide receiver for Minnesota, which he transferred to after playing cornerback at Penn State. Driver is a Christian.

Since 2004, Driver has co-hosted the statewide Packer analysis television series Inside the Huddle with Donald Driver with WLUK-TV's sports director Drew Smith. Every Thursday, Driver discusses football with John Mercure on Wisconsin's Afternoon News with John Mercure on AM 620 WTMJ. He previously served as host to the annual Offense vs. Defense softball game featuring members of the Green Bay Packers.

As a well-known athlete in the state of Wisconsin, Driver has been featured in marketing campaigns for companies such as McDonald's, AirTran Airways, Kwik Trip, Goodwill, Jani-King and Time Warner Cable.

Throughout his career, Driver was very active off the field, making over 300 charitable appearances since his rookie season in 1999. In the spring of 2001, Donald and his wife Betina created the Donald Driver Foundation, which offers assistance to ill children with unmanageable hospital bills, provides housing for the homeless, and donates to a variety of local charities. In December 2003, the foundation put two previously homeless families in new, fully furnished homes.

Donald has also donated much of his time and efforts to such institutions as Children's Hospital of Wisconsin and Goodwill Industries. In 2001, Driver was awarded the "Community Service Award" by the Green Bay Chamber of Commerce in recognition of his outstanding community involvement. In 2005, he was awarded the Ed Block Courage award by his Green Bay teammates. Driver was also named the 2013 AMVETS Humanitarian of the Year.

Driver is the author of three children's books, Quickie Handles a Loss, Quickie Makes the Team and Quickie Goes to the Big Game. The books are based on Driver's bedtime storytelling to his three children, and are sold statewide in Wisconsin. He has stated that "Quickie" is a nickname his mother gave him because, when she would chase him around the house, she could never catch him. In 2013, Driver released his official memoir, Driven, which included many personal stories about both his childhood and career with the Packers. Two weeks after the book's release, it made the New York Times Bestsellers list. In 2017, Driver released a health and fitness book, The 3D Body Revolution: The Ultimate Workout + Nutrition Blueprint to Get Healthy and Lean, which featured 25 recipes and 36 exercises. Following its release, The 3D Body Revolution was featured as a #1 new release in Amazon's exercise injuries and rehabilitation category.

On February 28, 2012, it was announced that Driver would join the cast of Dancing with the Stars for season 14, paired with professional dance partner Peta Murgatroyd. Driver's high energy and athleticism were repeatedly praised by the judges, though Driver was also notorious for not getting a perfect score, until their freestyle, from the judges. Driver and Murgatroyd made it all the way to the finale, and despite competitions from fellow finalists William Levy and Katherine Jenkins, Driver and Murgatroyd were declared winners on the season finale on May 22, 2012.

In March 2014, Donald Driver created the Donald Driver Driven To Achieve Awards. Since then, the Driven to Achieve Awards have honored 18 recipients and have given away over $1 million.

Driver currently splits his time between his home state of Texas and Milwaukee, Wisconsin, purchasing a $3 million Milwaukee loft in 2022 from fellow Wisconsin athlete Jabari Parker. He operates a nonprofit called the Donald Driver Foundation in both Wisconsin and Texas, and serves as the current cultural ambassador for Milwaukee's Marcus Center for the Performing Arts, in addition to business ventures.

Awards and achievements
Preceded by J. R. Martinez & Karina Smirnoff	Dancing with the Stars (US) winners Season 14 (Spring 2012 with Peta Murgatroyd)	Succeeded by Melissa Rycroft and Tony Dovolani
