= Norbeck-Nicholson Carriage House =

- U.S. National Register of Historic Places
- Location within South Dakota Location within the United States
- Location: 910 E. 2nd St.
- Nearest city: Redfield, South Dakota
- Coordinates: 44.873301°N 98.515212°W
- Built: c.1907
- NRHP reference No.: 14001190
- Added to NRHP: January 21, 2015

The Norbeck-Nicholson Carriage House, at 910 E. 2nd St. in Redfield in Spink County, South Dakota, is a carriage house listed on the National Register of Historic Places. The house was built sometime from 1907–1909.

It was built for Peter Norbeck and Charles Nicholson, who were neighbors and partners in a successful artesian well business based in Redfield.

The house was listed in 2015 "for its significant association with early local trends in vehicular transportation and for its architectural significance as a rare intact local example of a masonry carriage house."
