= Receiver (statue) =

Statue in Green Bay, Wisconsin

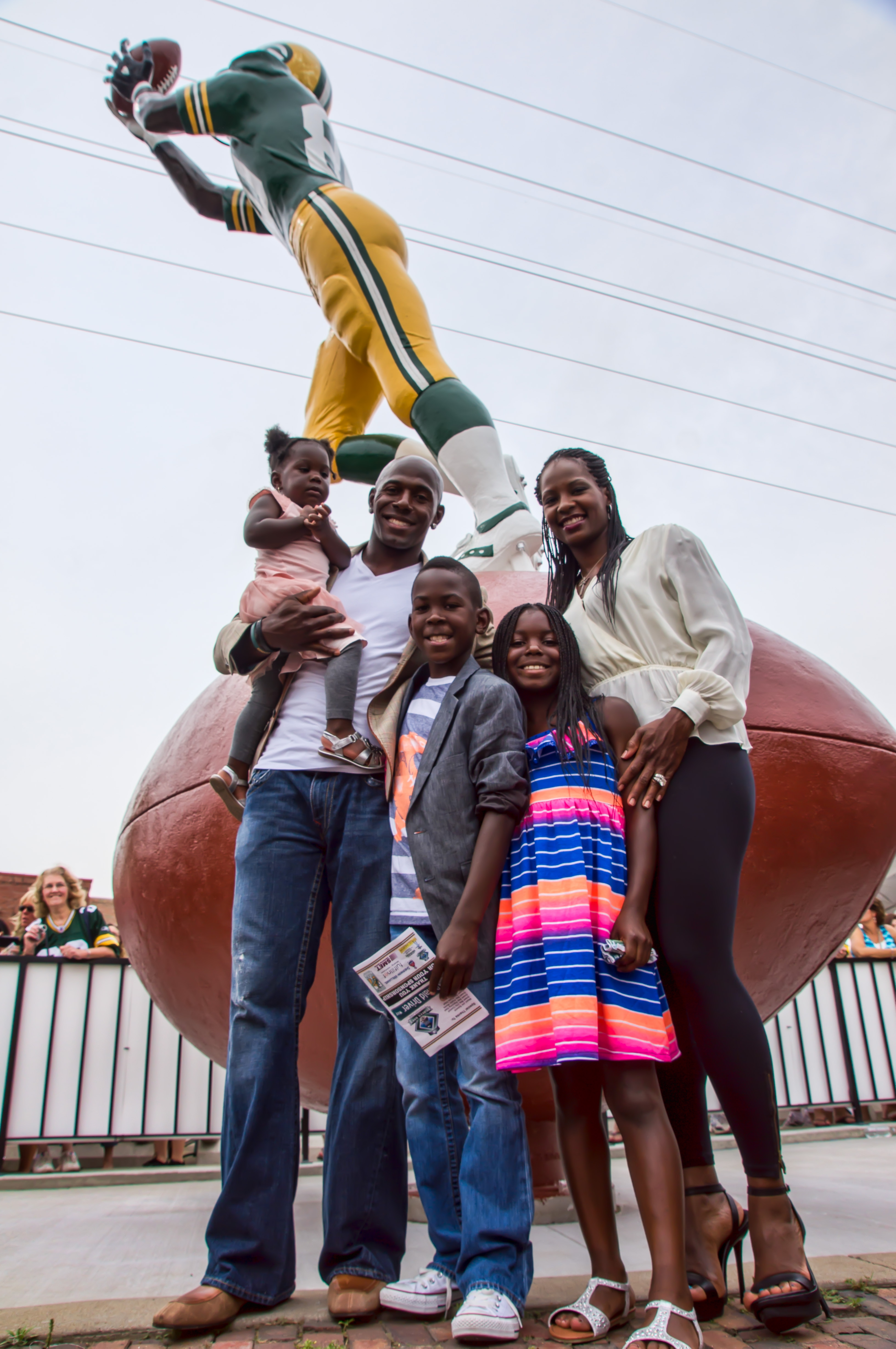
- Donald Driver and family pose in front of the statue dedicated in his honor.
- Artists: Andy and Mike Kuatza
- Subject: Donald Driver
- Dimensions: 6.7 m (22 ft)
- Location: Green Bay, Wisconsin, U.S.; 44°31′09″N 88°01′06″W

The Receiver is a 22-foot (6.7 m) tall public statue in Green Bay, Wisconsin, United States, associated with the Green Bay Packers, an American football team in the National Football League (NFL). The statue was commissioned in the early 1980s by the Green Bay Packers Hall of Fame to honor the Packers contributions to the development of the forward pass. It was designed and constructed in April 1985, with fabrication and installation completed in June 1985. The statue was originally located in front of the Green Bay Packers Hall of Fame, but was sold and moved in 2003 to the Neville Public Museum of Brown County. It was moved again in 2005 to its current location, in front of what was then Titletown Brewing. In 2013, the statue was repainted and rededicated to honor Donald Driver, a wide receiver who played 14 seasons for the Packers and set numerous team records. The statue's location on the property of the historic Chicago and North Western Depot (which was occupied by Titletown Brewing) makes it part of the Packers Heritage Trail.

== Development ==
Brothers Andy and Mike Kuatza, from Aniwa, Wisconsin, were hired by the Green Bay Packers Hall of Fame to design and construct a statue honoring the Green Bay Packers contributions to the forward pass in the NFL. The Packers co-founder, player, and head coach Curly Lambeau is credited with helping to develop the passing game in the early years of the NFL. The Receiver statue took two years of planning, which included three meetings between the Kuatza brothers and the Hall of Fame's board of directors. Mike provided most of the planning and design work, with the brother's National Rock and Sculpture partnership performing the fabrication. The Kuatza's business was not in statues or art, rather they typically produced miniature golf courses and related structures. Fabrication began in April 1985, taking about four weeks to complete. The statue was made using concrete and included a large pedestal in the shape of a football. Installation of the statue included the opportunity for donors to contribute $1,000 and receive their autograph on the pedestal. It weighed 5,700, with the statue reaching a height of 22 feet on top of the 6-foot tall pedestal. The statue was installed at the entrance of the Hall of Fame in June 1985.

== History ==
From 1985 to 2003, the Receiver statue was located at the entrance of the Green Bay Packers Hall of Fame. In 1988, when noting that the statue had been repainted to better match current Packers uniforms, a local Wisconsin newspaper claimed that it had "become the most photographed landmark in the Green Bay area". The Packers began a major renovation of Lambeau Field, their home stadium, which was scheduled to be complete in 2003. As part of the renovations, the Packers were building a new site to host the team's Hall of Fame, which had been located offsite on Lombardi Avenue. With an updated design and layout, it was determined that the statue did not match the character of the new Hall of Fame. The Hall of Fame sold the statue in 2003 for $45,000 to S. J. Boyer Construction Inc. and it was moved to the Neville Public Museum of Brown County, where it remained until 2005. It was moved across the street to the Chicago and North Western Depot, a historic train station that housed a restaurant called Titletown Brewing at the time. During the move, the statue split at a leg joint and had to undergo repairs.

In 2013, the Packers honored Donald Driver, a wide receiver for the team for 14 seasons, by renaming Pearl Street (which was adjacent to the location of the statue) to Donald Driver Way. As part of this recognition, the Receiver statue was repainted to match Drivers' likeness, nameplate, and uniform number. Prior to its repainting, the statue was a generic likeness of a receiver, with "PACKER" on the nameplate, and "88" as the uniform number. The statue was rededicated in 2013 with Driver in attendance for the ceremony. In 2024, the statue was repainted and the base was repaired.

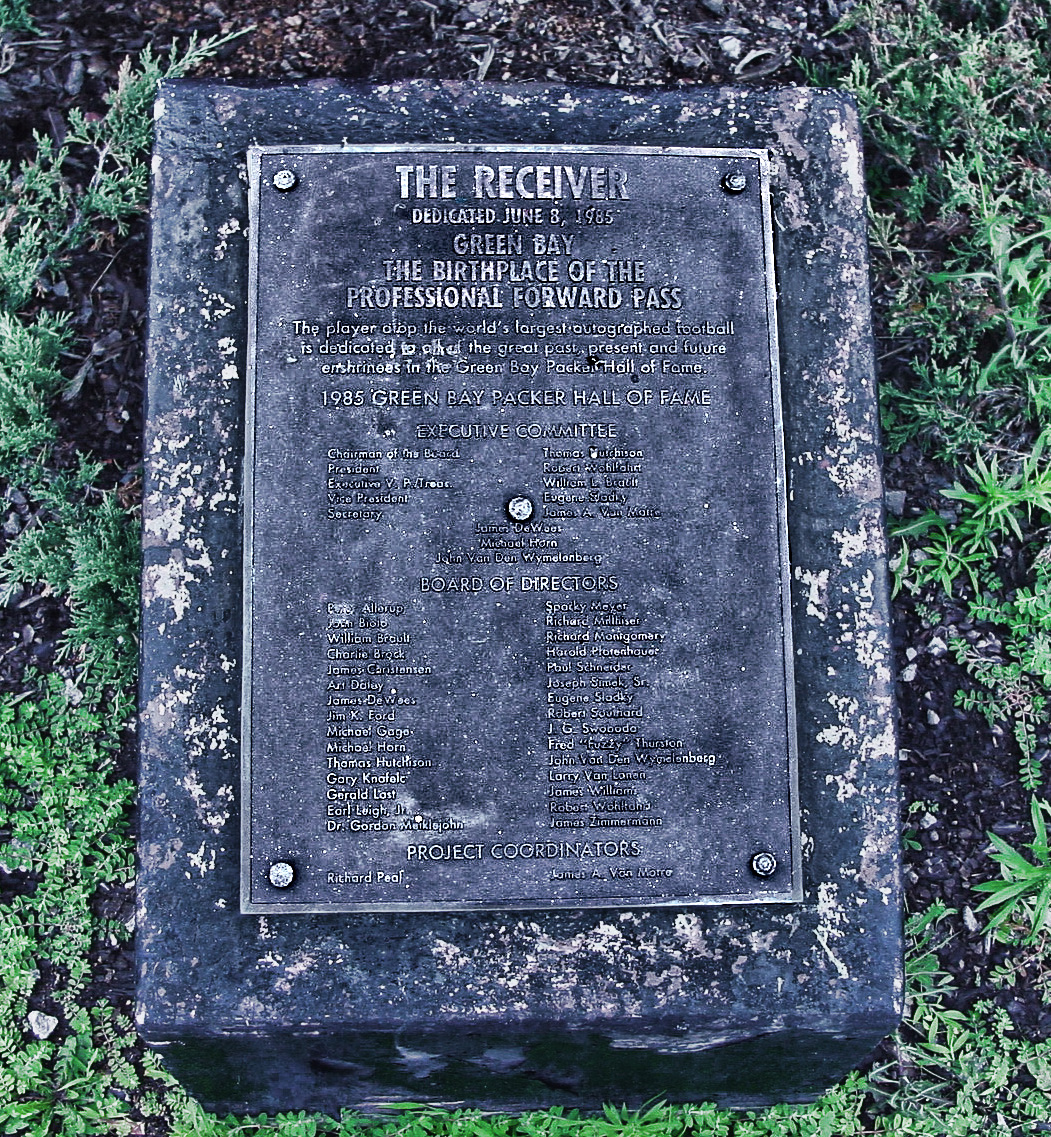
Original statue dedication plaque

== Legacy ==
The Receiver statue maintains its status as a local landmark. In 2012, the Packers Heritage Trail, a walking and biking trail dedicated to the history of the Packers, was established; the Chicago and North Western Depot with the statue is located along the Trail.
