= Kendall, Monroe County, Wisconsin =

Kendall, Wisconsin
- Village
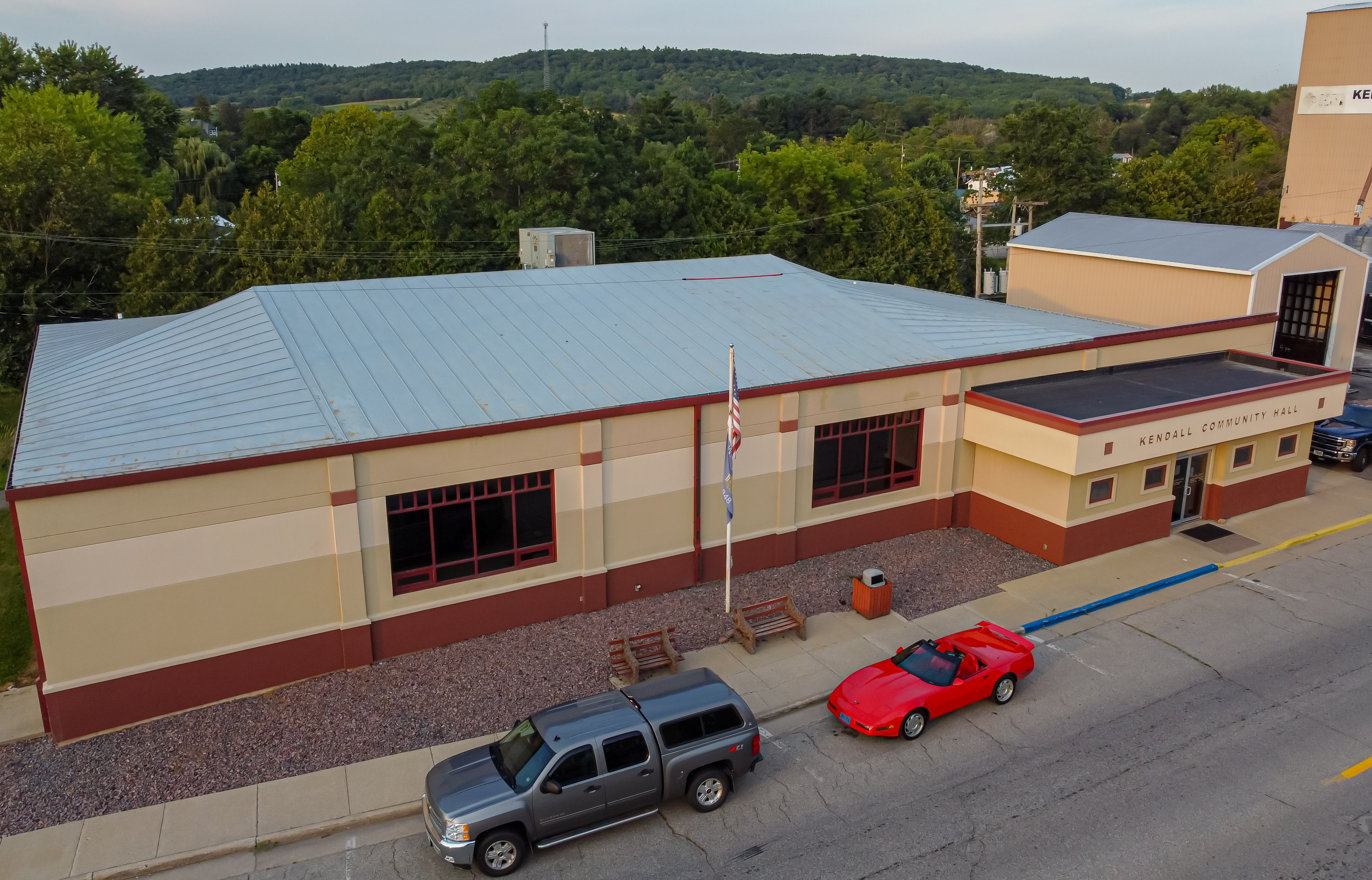
- Kendall Community Hall

- Location of Kendall in Monroe County, Wisconsin.
- Coordinates: 43°47′38″N 90°22′09″W
- Country: United States
- State: Wisconsin
- County: Monroe

Area
  - Total: 0.76 sq mi (1.98 km^{2})
  - Land: 0.76 sq mi (1.98 km^{2})
  - Water: 0 sq mi (0.00 km^{2})
- Elevation: 1,030 ft (314 m)

Population (2020)
  - Total: 484
  - Density: 633/sq mi (244/km^{2})
- Time zone: UTC-6 (Central (CST))
  - Summer (DST): UTC-5 (CDT)
- Area code: 608
- FIPS code: 55-39150
- GNIS feature ID: 1567404
- Website: www.kendallwi.com

Kendall is a village in Monroe County, Wisconsin, United States, along the Baraboo River. The population was 484 at the 2020 census.

== History ==
A post office called Kendall has been in operation since 1874. The village was named for L. G. Kendall, a local farmer and landowner.

== Geography ==
Kendall is located at 43°47′38″N 90°22′09″W (43.793890, -90.369226).

According to the United States Census Bureau, the village has a total area of 0.74 square miles (1.92 km^{2}), all land.

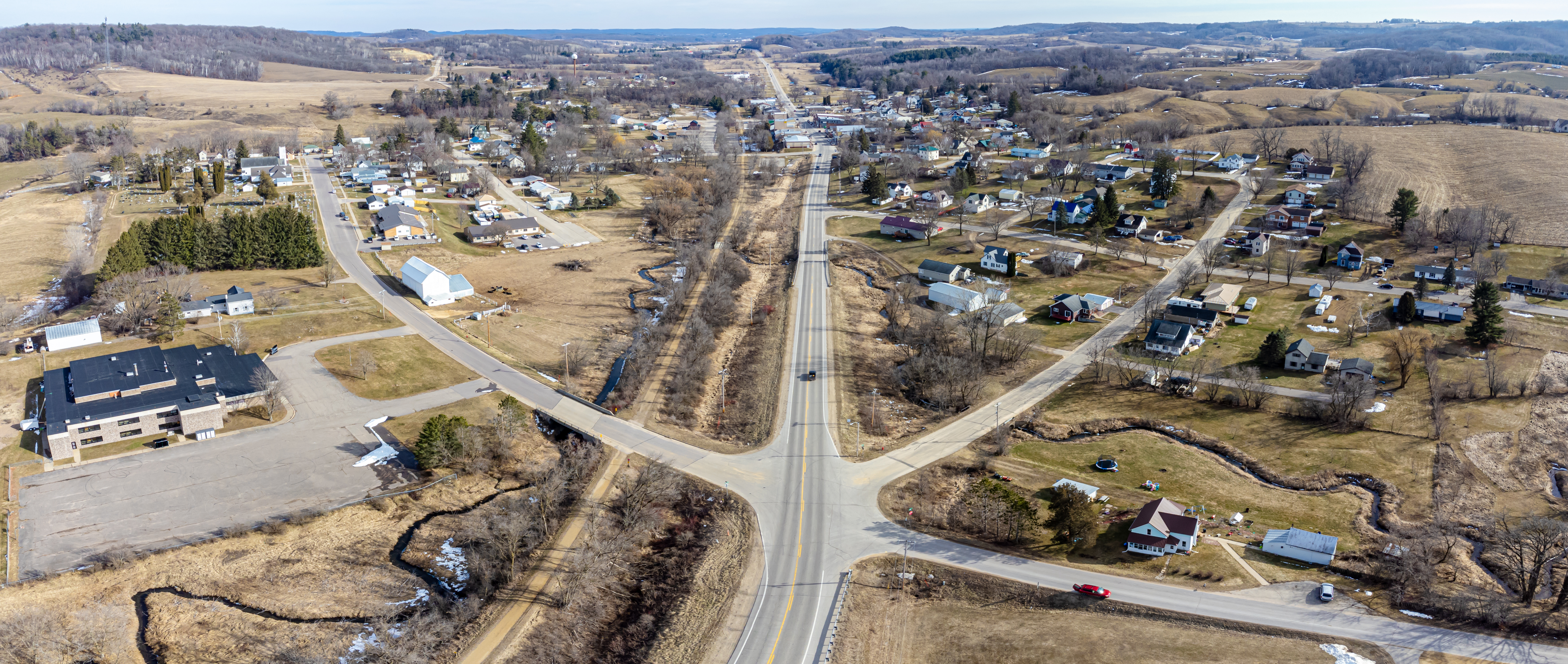
Wis-71 running through town

== Demographics ==
Historical population
Census	Pop.	Note	%±
1880	282		—
1890	304		7.8%
1900	460		51.3%
1910	477		3.7%
1920	506		6.1%
1930	517		2.2%
1940	478		−7.5%
1950	558		16.7%
1960	528		−5.4%
1970	468		−11.4%
1980	486		3.8%
1990	453		−6.8%
2000	469		3.5%
2010	472		0.6%
2020	484		2.5%
U.S. Decennial Census

=== 2010 census ===
As of the census of 2010, there were 472 people, 198 households, and 133 families living in the village. The population density was 637.8 inhabitants per square mile (246.3/km^{2}). There were 233 housing units at an average density of 314.9 per square mile (121.6/km^{2}). The racial makeup of the village was 97.7% White, 1.3% Native American, 0.2% Asian, and 0.8% from two or more races. Hispanic or Latino of any race were 2.1% of the population.

There were 198 households, of which 29.8% had children under the age of 18 living with them, 50.5% were married couples living together, 12.1% had a female householder with no husband present, 4.5% had a male householder with no wife present, and 32.8% were non-families. 28.3% of all households were made up of individuals, and 11.6% had someone living alone who was 65 years of age or older. The average household size was 2.38 and the average family size was 2.87.

The median age in the village was 42.5 years. 23.3% of residents were under the age of 18; 8.6% were between the ages of 18 and 24; 22.4% were from 25 to 44; 30.4% were from 45 to 64; and 15.7% were 65 years of age or older. The gender makeup of the village was 48.7% male and 51.3% female.

=== 2000 census ===
As of the census of 2000, there were 469 people, 200 households, and 126 families living in the village. The population density was 632.2 people per square mile (244.7/km^{2}). There were 213 housing units at an average density of 287.1/sq mi (111.1/km^{2}). The racial makeup of the village was 99.79% White and 0.21% Pacific Islander. Hispanic or Latino of any race were 0.64% of the population.

There were 200 households, out of which 31.0% had children under the age of 18 living with them, 53.0% were married couples living together, 5.5% had a female householder with no husband present, and 37.0% were non-families. 33.0% of all households were made up of individuals, and 17.5% had someone living alone who was 65 years of age or older. The average household size was 2.33 and the average family size was 2.98.

In the village, the population was spread out, with 24.3% under the age of 18, 9.0% from 18 to 24, 27.3% from 25 to 44, 21.1% from 45 to 64, and 18.3% who were 65 years of age or older. The median age was 39 years. For every 100 females, there were 95.4 males. For every 100 females age 18 and over, there were 99.4 males.

The median income for a household in the village was $36,250, and the median income for a family was $43,393. Males had a median income of $30,000 versus $20,938 for females. The per capita income for the village was $21,073. About 8.5% of families and 11.6% of the population were below the poverty line, including 13.5% of those under age 18 and 16.9% of those age 65 or over.

== Transportation ==
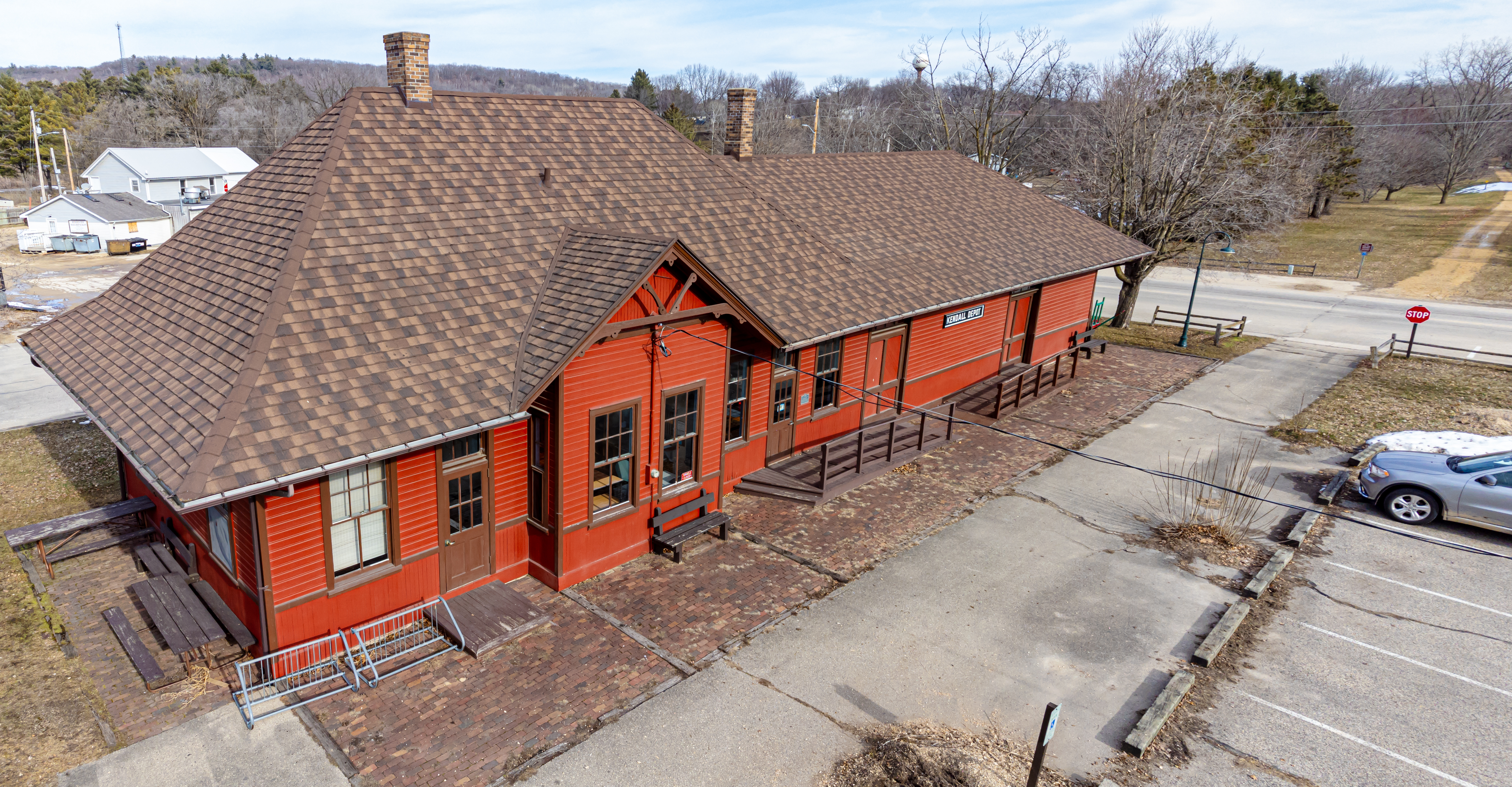
Kendalls Depot with Elroy-Sparta State Trail running by

Kendall formerly had intercity passenger rail service available at the Kendalls Depot. Today, the depot is listed on the National Register of Historic Places and the rail line is the Elroy-Sparta State Trail.
