= Spink County Courthouse =

- U.S. National Register of Historic Places
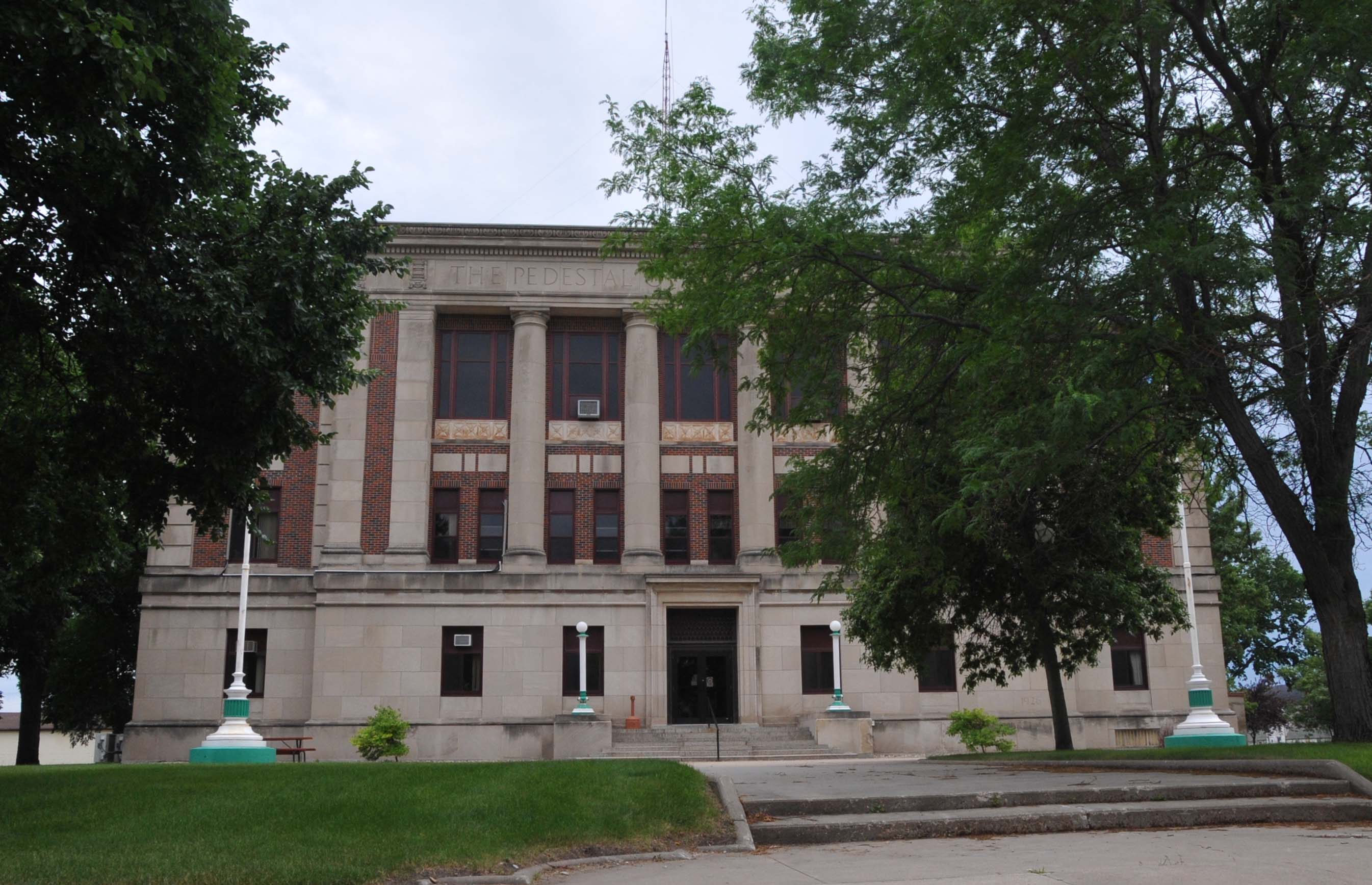

- Location within South Dakota Location within the United States
- Interactive map showing the location of Spink County Courthouse
- Location: 210 E. Seventh Ave., Redfield, South Dakota
- Coordinates: 44°52′31″N 98°30′51″W
- Area: less than one acre
- Built: 1927
- Built by: Standard Construction Co.
- Architect: Day, Beaver Wade
- Architectural style: Classical Revival
- MPS: County Courthouses of South Dakota MPS
- NRHP reference No.: 01001219
- Added to NRHP: November 8, 2001

The Spink County Courthouse, located at 210 E. Seventh Ave. in Redfield in Spink County, South Dakota is a historic courthouse built in 1927. It was listed on the National Register of Historic Places in 2001.

It was designed by architect Beaver Wade Day of Toltz, King & Day Inc. and was built by Standard Construction Co.
