= Kendalls station =

Historic railroad depot

Kendall Depot
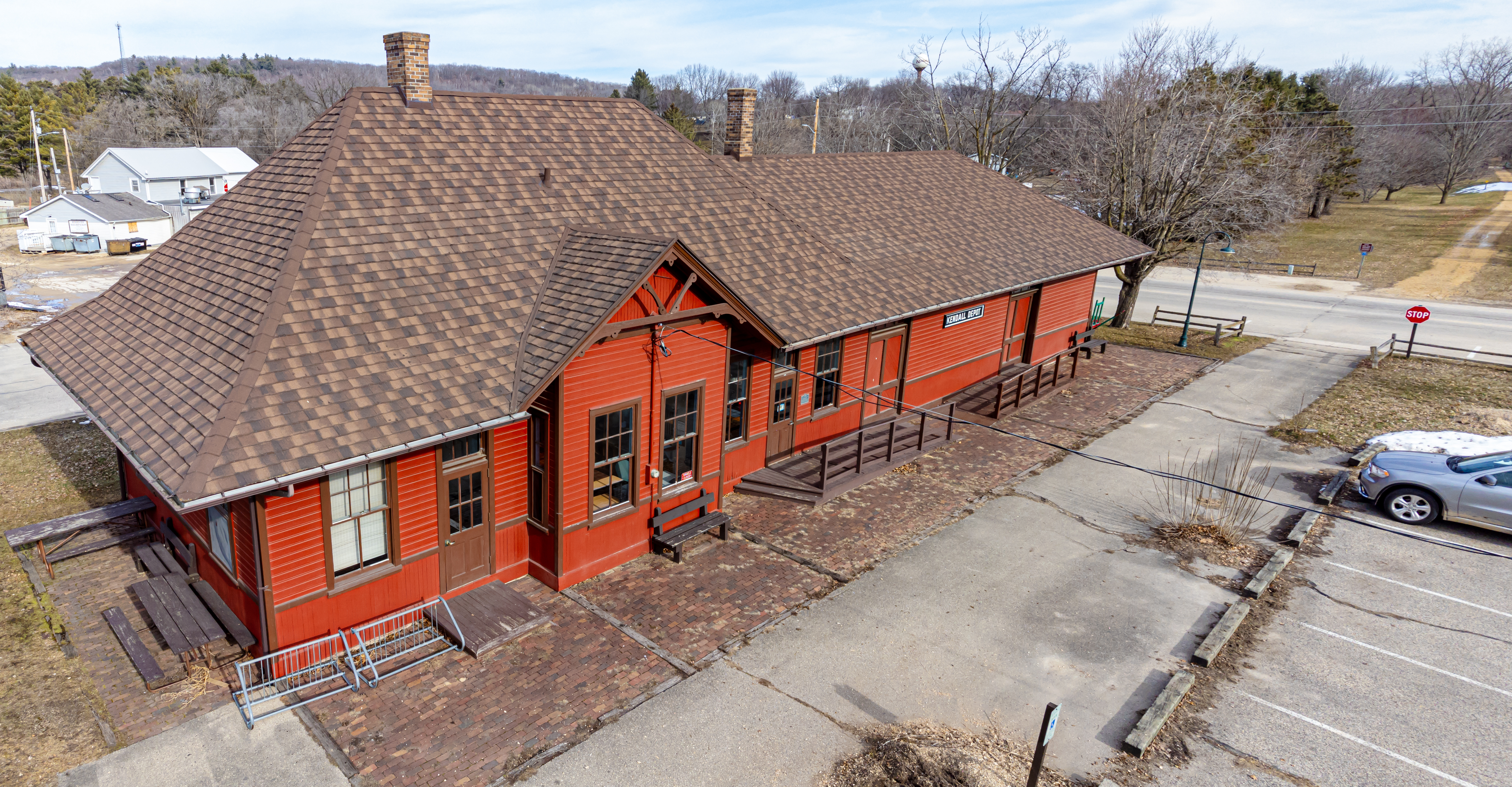
- Kendalls Depot next to Elroy-Sparta State Trail

General information
- Location: North Railroad Street, Kendall, Wisconsin

History
- Opened: 1900

Former services
Preceding station	Chicago and North Western Railway	Following station
Wilton toward Lead	Elroy – Lead	Glendale toward Elroy
- Kendalls Depot
- U.S. National Register of Historic Places
- Location within Wisconsin Location within the United States
- Coordinates: 43°47′35″N 90°22′09″W
- Area: 1 acre (0.40 ha)
- Built: 1900
- NRHP reference No.: 81000050
- Added to NRHP: August 12, 1981
Location

The Kendalls Depot is a historic railroad station located on North Railroad Street in Kendall, Wisconsin. The station was built in 1900 for the Chicago & Northwestern Railway. It used the railroad's standard "Number Two" design and was given a camelback roof and ornamental stickwork to distinguish it. The line was abandoned in 1964 and the former railbed was converted into the nation's first rail trail, opening in 1967. Today, the depot serves as a trailhead for the Elroy-Sparta State Trail and houses a railroad history museum.

The depot was added to the National Register of Historic Places in 1981.
