= Brookings station =

Brookings
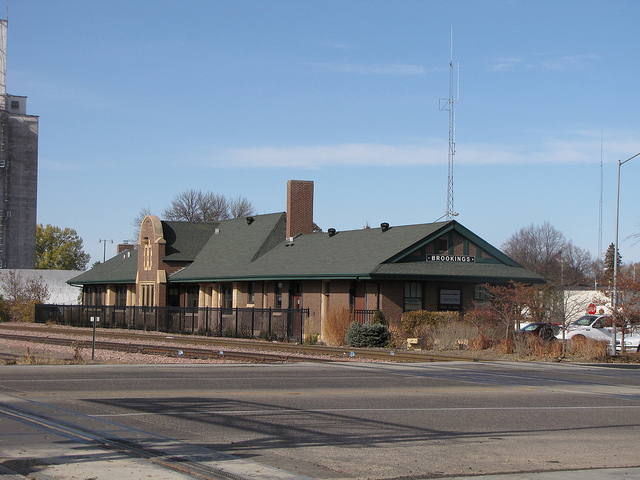
- Brookings depot (2011)

General information
- Location: 117 Main Avenue, Brookings, South Dakota
- Coordinates: 44°18′25″N 96°47′57″W
- System: Former Chicago and North Western Railway passenger rail station
- Line: Rapid City, Pierre and Eastern Railroad

History
- Opened: February 1, 1905
- Closed: 1960

Former services
Preceding station	Chicago and North Western Railway	Following station
Volga toward Lead	Elroy – Lead	Aurora toward Elroy
- Chicago and North Western Railway Depot
- U.S. National Register of Historic Places
- Location within South Dakota
- Location: 117 Main Ave; Brookings, South Dakota
- Coordinates: 44°18′25″N 96°47′57″W
- NRHP reference No.: 76001716
- Added to NRHP: October 8, 1976
Location

The Chicago and North Western Railway Depot was built by the Chicago and North Western Railway (C&NW) in the early 1900s. It is located at the south end of the business district in Brookings, South Dakota. The building is a rectangular single-story brick patternbook style building with some classical features.

The C&NW first entered Brookings in 1879. The depot opened February 1, 1905 and functioned as a passenger station until 1960.

The depot was listed in the National Register of Historic Places because of its architecture and also because of its association with the development of Brookings.
