= Beresford station =

Beresford
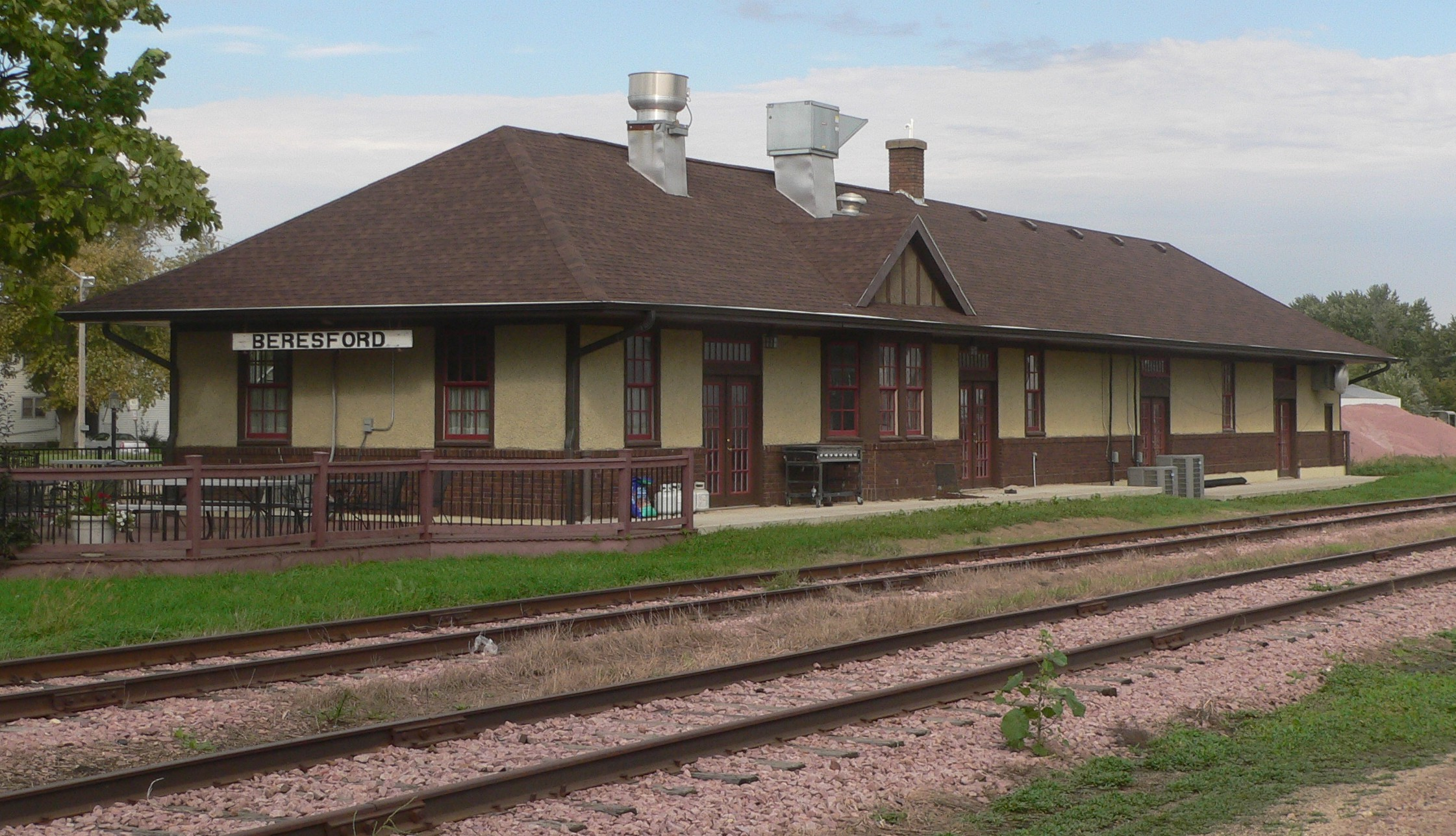
- Beresford depot (2015)

General information
- Location: 1 Depot Sq., Beresford, South Dakota
- Coordinates: 43°04′50″N 96°46′13″W
- System: Former Chicago and North Western Railway passenger rail station

History
- Opened: 1924
- Chicago and North Western Railway Depot
- U.S. National Register of Historic Places
- Location within South Dakota
- Location: 1 Depot Sq; Beresford, South Dakota
- Coordinates: 43°04′50″N 96°46′13″W
- Built: 1924
- Architect: Bakken & Anderson Construction Co.
- NRHP reference No.: 85000262
- Added to NRHP: January 1, 1985
Location

The Chicago and North Western Railway Depot was built by the Chicago and North Western Railway (C&NW) in 1924. It is located at the east end of the business district in Beresford, South Dakota. The long rectangular depot is constructed of concrete, brick, and stucco on frame. The building consists of a freight room, the gentleman's waiting room, the washrooms and ticket office, and the ladies' waiting room.

The C&NW first entered Beresford in 1884. The current depot opened 1924 as a replacement for the previous smaller depot. At the peak of rail service, there were two freight and four passenger trains running on a daily basis.

The depot was listed in the National Register of Historic Places because of its architecture and also because of its association with the development of Beresford.

| Preceding station | Chicago and North Western Railway | Following station |
|---|---|---|
| Hurley toward Iroquois | Iroquois - Eagle Grove | Ireton toward Eagle Grove |
