= Redfield station =

Historic railroad depot in South Dakota, U.S.

Redfield
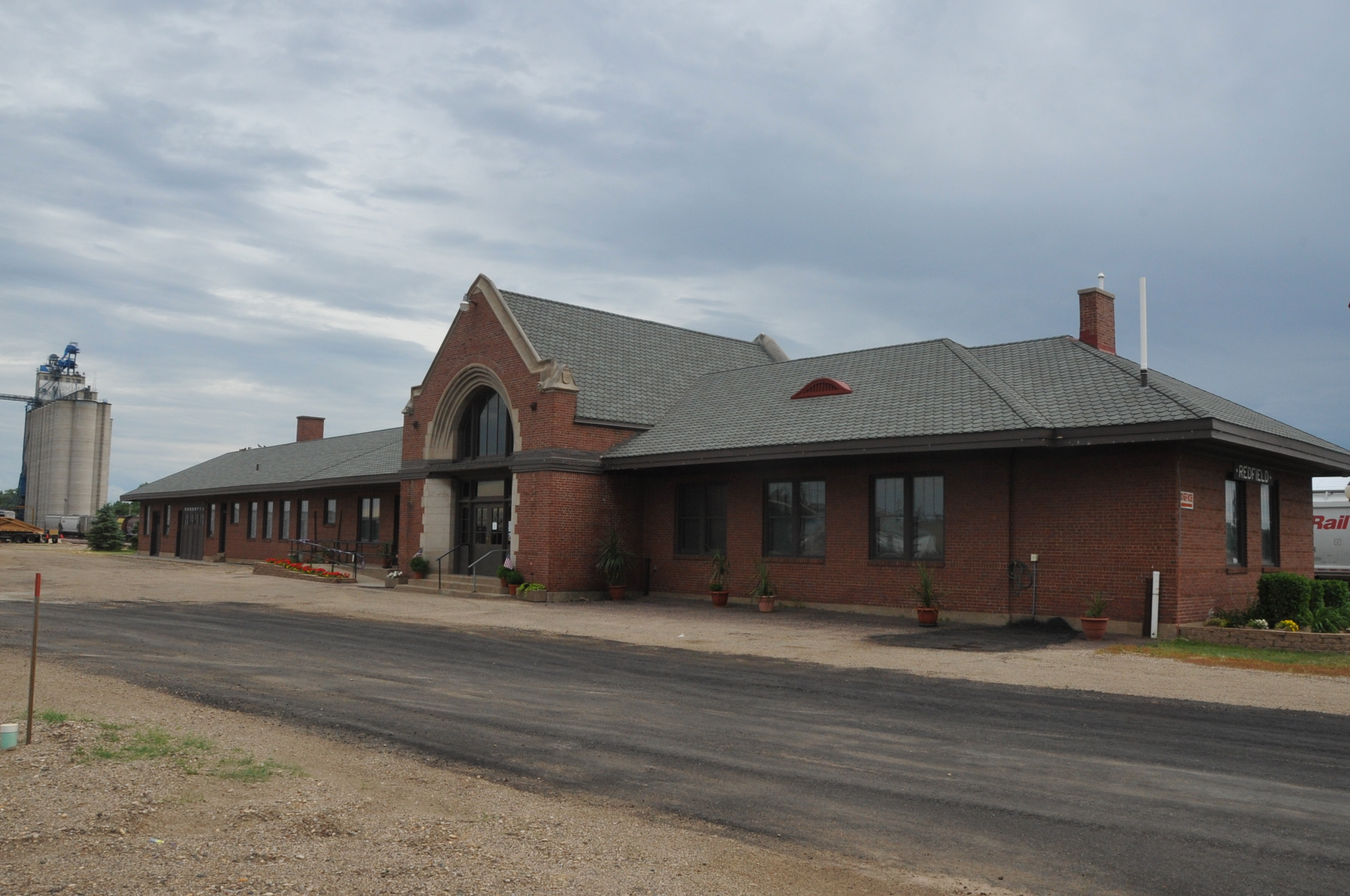
- Redfield depot (2013)

General information
- Location: 715 W 3rd Street, Redfield, South Dakota
- Coordinates: 44°52′30″N 98°31′19″W
- System: Former Chicago and North Western Railway passenger rail station

History
- Opened: October 23, 1914
- Closed: 1950s
- Rebuilt: 2002–2005
- Chicago and North Western Railway Depot
- U.S. National Register of Historic Places
- Location within South Dakota
- Location: US 212; Redfield, South Dakota
- Coordinates: 44°52′30″N 98°31′19″W
- Built: October 23, 1914
- Architect: Charles Frost (Frost & Granger)
- Architectural style: Gothic Revival
- NRHP reference No.: 80003732
- Added to NRHP: November 21, 1980
Location

The Chicago and North Western Railway Depot was built by the Chicago and North Western Railway (C&NW) in 1914 at a cost of $38,000. It is located at the west end of the business district in Redfield, South Dakota. The depot is a long rectangular red brick building with a slate roof in an uncommon Gothic Revival style.

The depot contains separate men's and women's waiting rooms, the agent's office which has ticket windows facing the entrance and an exterior bay window along the tracks, as well as a dining room, the kitchen, telegraph office and the freight office.

The Gothic Revival design of the depot emphasized the importance of the depot due to the rarity of Gothic Revival architecture for commercial buildings at the time. The first Chicago and Northwestern depot was built in 1891, ten years after the town had been named in honor of an auditor for the railroad. Redfield was an important subdivision point on the railroad and at times up to 250 residents of the town worked for the C&NW.

The depot was listed in the National Register of Historic Places because of the significance its architecture as an example of the work of Charles Frost of Frost and Granger of Chicago, the major architectural firm retained by the Chicago and North Western Railway. It is also important as an example of the Gothic Revival architecture and its association with the development of Redfield.

Passenger service to the depot ended in the 1950s and renovations to the depot took place in the early 2000s. Today, the depot serves as a museum and visitor center.

Preceding station	Chicago and North Western Railway	Following station
Zell toward Blunt	Blunt-Winthrop	Frankfort toward Winthrop
