= Sac City station =

- Sac City Chicago and North Western Depot
- U.S. National Register of Historic Places
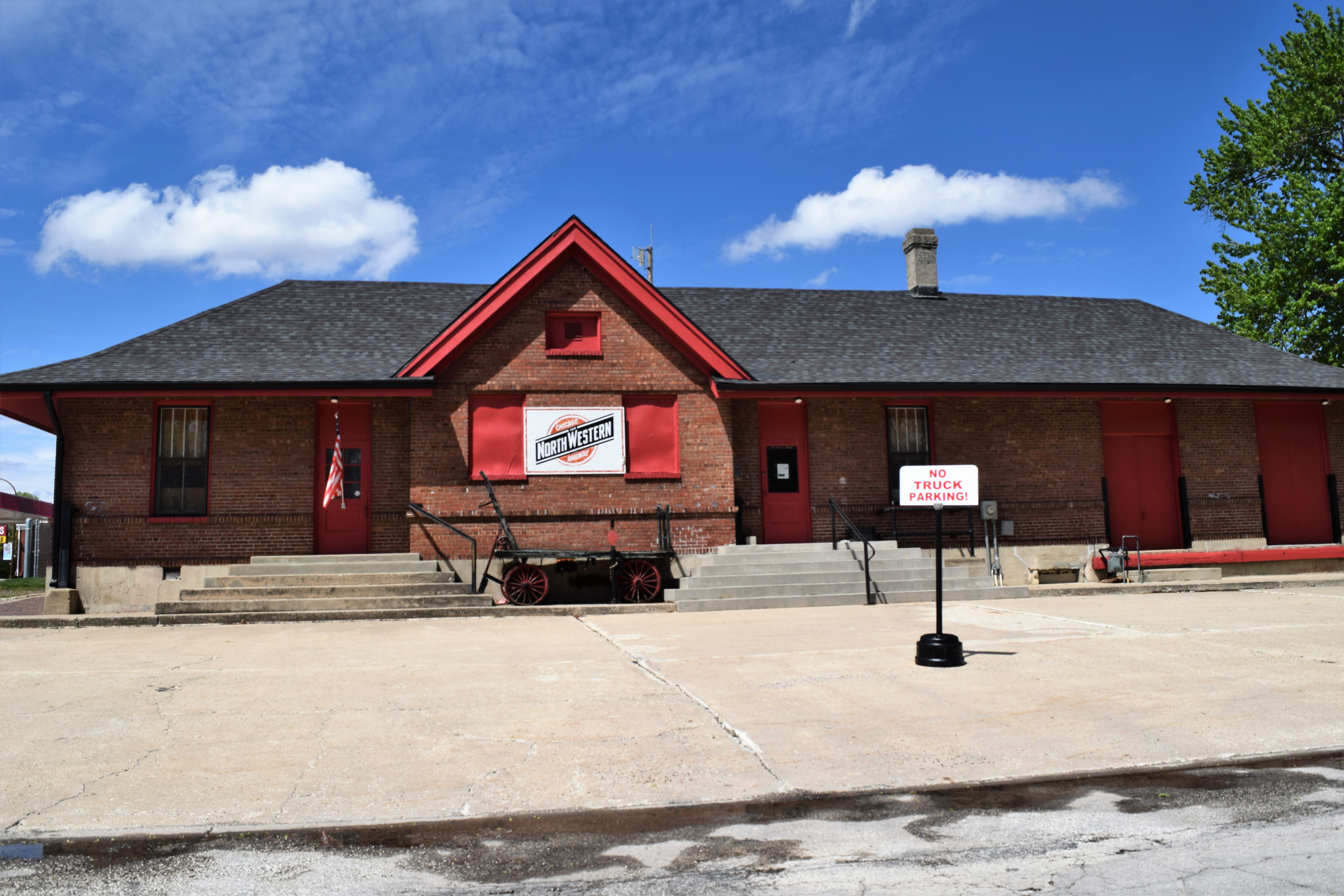

- Location within Iowa Location within the United States
- Location: 103 N. 13th St. Sac City, Iowa
- Coordinates: 42°25′23.4″N 94°59′58.4″W
- Area: Less than 1 acre
- Built: 1916
- Architect: Chicago & North Western Railroad
- MPS: Advent & Development of Railroads in Iowa MPS
- NRHP reference No.: 15000998
- Added to NRHP: January 26, 2016

Sac City station is a historic former train station located in Sac City, Iowa, United States. The city was platted in 1855, and soon after they began to campaign for a rail line into the town. It took 23 years before the railroad arrived. The Maple River Railroad was the first to lay tracks in Sac County in 1877, but it went to Wall Lake rather than Sac City. The Sac City & Wall Lake Railroad was formed that year and the tracks were laid between the two towns in 1878. The Chicago & North Western Railroad acquired the line in 1884, and built a two-story frame depot in Sac City. The business district grew up around the depot. In 1916 the Chicago & North Western replaced the frame depot with this single story brick depot a block to the south. It was a combination depot, passenger and freight, that utilized Chicago & North Western's Number One standard plan.

At one time there were eight passenger trains that stopped in Sac City. Passenger service was discontinued here in 1948. The depot was used by the railroad as a freight depot until 1971, when it was sold to Youll Plumbing. The railroad abandoned the tracks the following year. Youll sold the building in 1976, and it became The Depot Restaurant. In 2012 the restaurant closed and it now houses other retail establishments. The former depot was listed on the National Register of Historic Places in 2016.

Preceding station	Chicago and North Western Railway	Following station
Early toward Sioux City	Sioux City – Carroll	Lake View toward Carroll
