= Crandon, South Dakota =

Unincorporated community in South Dakota, U.S.

Coordinates: 44°46′29″N 98°27′29″W

Crandon is an unincorporated community in Spink County, in the U.S. state of South Dakota.

== History ==
Crandon was platted in 1881. The community was named for Frank P. Crandon, a railroad official, as did the township.

In its heyday, Crandon boasted about 200 residents. It was served by a branch line of the Chicago and Northwestern Railroad, which bisected the town's Main Street. The branch connected Redfield to Huron by the James Valley Junction west of the latter. The branch line was abandoned in the late 1970s. The town's economy was dependent on agriculture, and when the harvest was poor, Crandon lost residents to nearby Redfield and Tulare.

A post office was established at Crandon in 1881, and remained in operation until it was discontinued in 1935.
