= Tulare, South Dakota =

- Town
- Location in Spink County and the state of South Dakota
- Coordinates: 44°44′18″N 98°30′32″W
- Country: United States
- State: South Dakota
- County: Spink
- Incorporated: 1916

Area
  - Total: 0.25 sq mi (0.66 km^{2})
  - Land: 0.25 sq mi (0.66 km^{2})
  - Water: 0 sq mi (0.00 km^{2})
- Elevation: 1,316 ft (401 m)

Population (2020)
  - Total: 211
  - Density: 825.6/sq mi (318.76/km^{2})
- Time zone: UTC-6 (Central (CST))
  - Summer (DST): UTC-5 (CDT)
- ZIP code: 57476
- Area code: 605
- FIPS code: 46-64300
- GNIS feature ID: 1267605

Tulare (pronounced too-LAYR') is a town in Spink County, South Dakota, United States. The population was 211 at the 2020 census.

Tulare was laid out in 1883.

== Geography ==
According to the United States Census Bureau, the town has a total area of 0.26 square miles (0.67 km^{2}), all land.

== Demographics ==
Historical population
Census	Pop.	Note	%±
1920	324		—
1930	305		−5.9%
1940	244		−20.0%
1950	212		−13.1%
1960	225		6.1%
1970	211		−6.2%
1980	238		12.8%
1990	244		2.5%
2000	221		−9.4%
2010	207		−6.3%
2020	211		1.9%
U.S. Decennial Census

=== 2010 census ===
As of the census of 2010, there were 207 people, 90 households, and 52 families living in the town. The population density was 796.2 inhabitants per square mile (307.4/km^{2}). There were 103 housing units at an average density of 396.2 per square mile (153.0/km^{2}). The racial makeup of the town was 98.1% White, 0.5% Native American, 0.5% Asian, and 1.0% from two or more races. Hispanic or Latino of any race were 0.5% of the population.

There were 90 households, of which 24.4% had children under the age of 18 living with them, 47.8% were married couples living together, 5.6% had a female householder with no husband present, 4.4% had a male householder with no wife present, and 42.2% were non-families. 34.4% of all households were made up of individuals, and 18.9% had someone living alone who was 65 years of age or older. The average household size was 2.30 and the average family size was 2.96.

The median age in the town was 44.8 years. 22.2% of residents were under the age of 18; 8.7% were between the ages of 18 and 24; 19.3% were from 25 to 44; 28% were from 45 to 64; and 21.7% were 65 years of age or older. The gender makeup of the town was 52.2% male and 47.8% female.

=== 2000 census ===
As of the census of 2000, there were 221 people, 100 households, and 60 families living in the town. The population density was 863.1 inhabitants per square mile (333.2/km^{2}). There were 113 housing units at an average density of 441.3 per square mile (170.4/km^{2}). The racial makeup of the town was 96.38% White, 0.90% Asian, and 2.71% from two or more races.

There were 100 households, out of which 27.0% had children under the age of 18 living with them, 49.0% were married couples living together, 10.0% had a female householder with no husband present, and 40.0% were non-families. 37.0% of all households were made up of individuals, and 16.0% had someone living alone who was 65 years of age or older. The average household size was 2.21 and the average family size was 2.93.

In the town, the population was spread out, with 24.9% under the age of 18, 6.8% from 18 to 24, 23.1% from 25 to 44, 24.0% from 45 to 64, and 21.3% who were 65 years of age or older. The median age was 43 years. For every 100 females, there were 106.5 males. For every 100 females age 18 and over, there were 90.8 males.

The median income for a household in the town was $25,313, and the median income for a family was $33,750. Males had a median income of $23,500 versus $20,893 for females. The per capita income for the town was $18,303. About 12.7% of families and 18.1% of the population were below the poverty line, including 57.6% of those under the age of eighteen and 11.9% of those 65 or over.

== Residents ==
- Beda Cornwall, librarian
