= Mankato Union Depot =

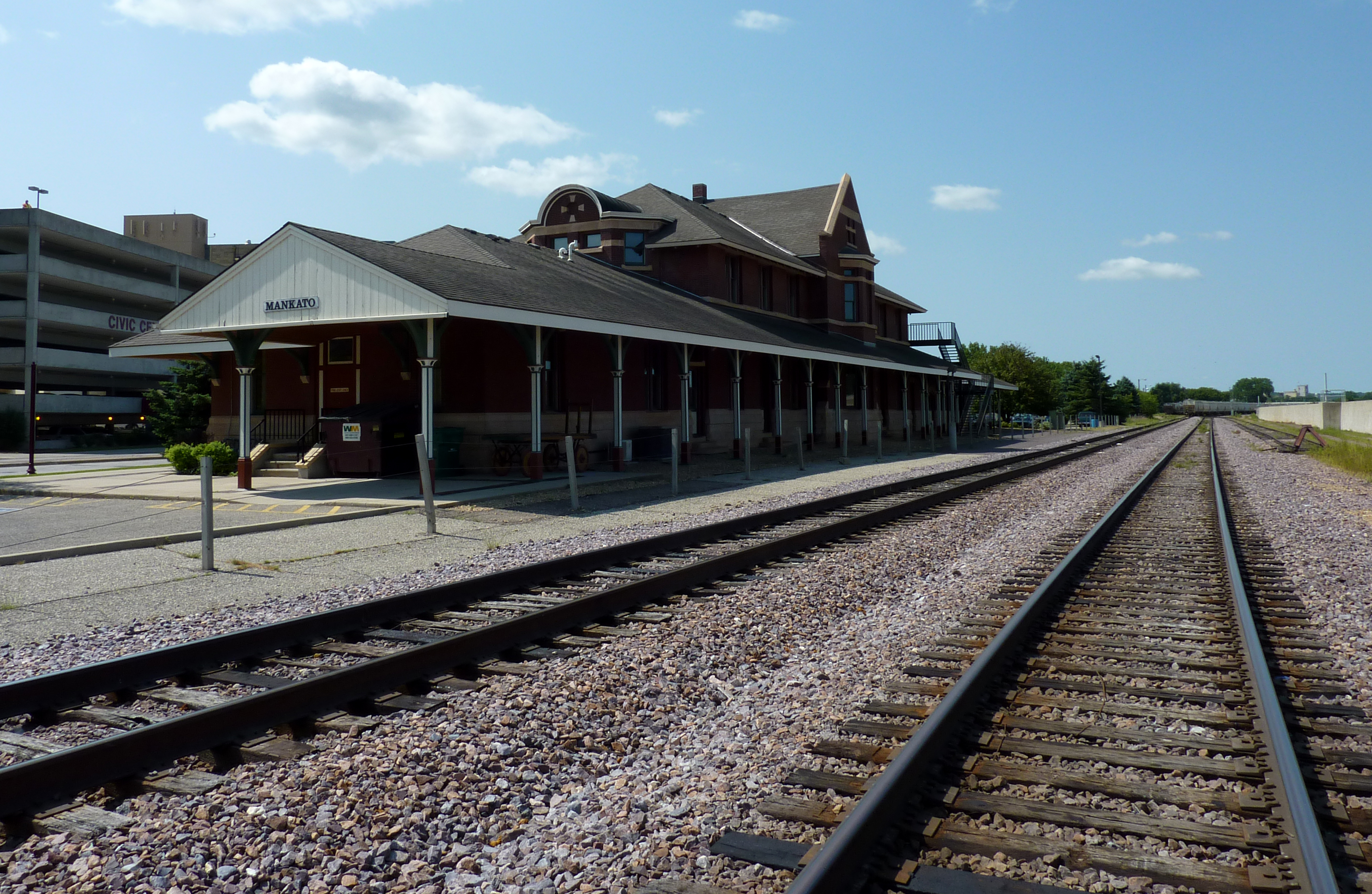
- The Mankato, Minnesota Depot in 2009

General information
- Location: 112 Pike St.
- Coordinates: 44°10′03″N 94°00′16″W
- System: Former Chicago and North Western Railway passenger rail station

History
- Opened: 1896

Former services
Preceding station	Chicago and North Western Railway	Following station
Minneopa toward Omaha	Omaha – Minneapolis	Kasota toward Minneapolis
Judson toward Lead	Elroy – Lead	Burdette toward Elroy
Preceding station	Chicago Great Western Railway	Following station
Terminus	Mankato – Simpson	Madison Lake toward Simpson
- Mankato Union Depot
- U.S. National Register of Historic Places
- Location within Minnesota Location within the United States
- Location: Mankato, Minnesota
- Coordinates: 44°10′03″N 94°00′16″W
- Built: 1896
- Architect: J.B. Nelsen & Co
- NRHP reference No.: 80001956
- Added to NRHP: July 28, 1980
Location

The Mankato Union Depot in Mankato, Minnesota, United States, is a historic railway station. It was added to the National Register of Historic Places in 1980. The depot was built in 1896 by the Chicago and Northwestern Railway and the Chicago, St. Paul, Minneapolis and Omaha Railway. Passenger service ended in the 1960s and today the depot houses a business.
