= Green Bay station (Chicago and North Western Railway) =

Green Bay
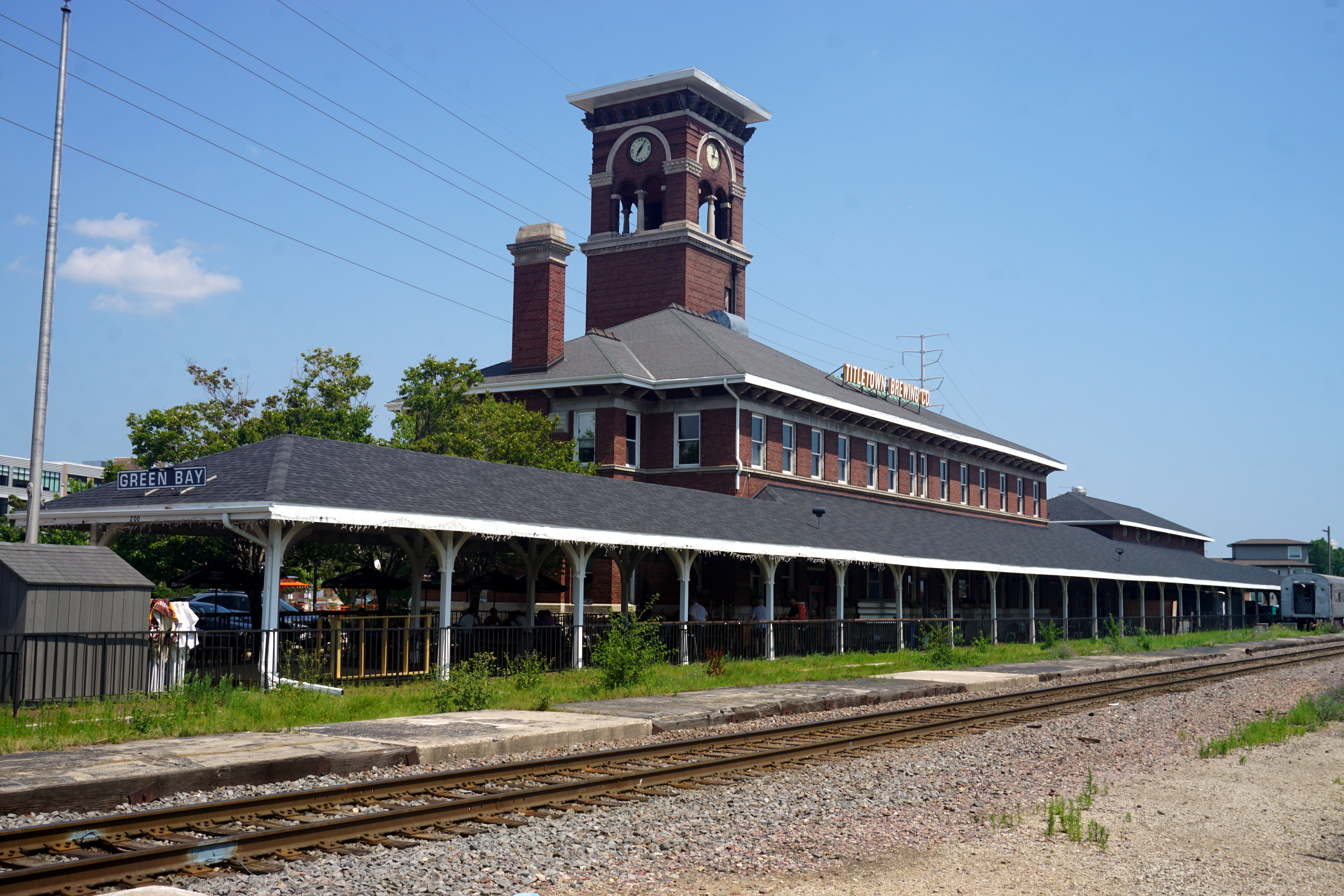

General information
- Location: 200 Dousman Street; Green Bay, Wisconsin
- System: Chicago and North Western Railroad station
- Platforms: 1 side platform, 1 island platform
- Tracks: 2

History
- Opened: 1899
- Closed: 1971

Services
Preceding station	Chicago and North Western Railway	Following station
Big Suamico toward Ishpeming	Ishpeming – Milwaukee Via Fond du Lac	Green Bay Junction toward Milwaukee
Terminus	Green Bay – Milwaukee via Sheboygan	Green Bay Junction toward Milwaukee
Anston toward Ashland	Ashland – Green Bay	Terminus
Anston toward Scott Lake	Scott Lake – Green Bay	Terminus
- Chicago and North Western Railway Passenger Depot
- U.S. National Register of Historic Places
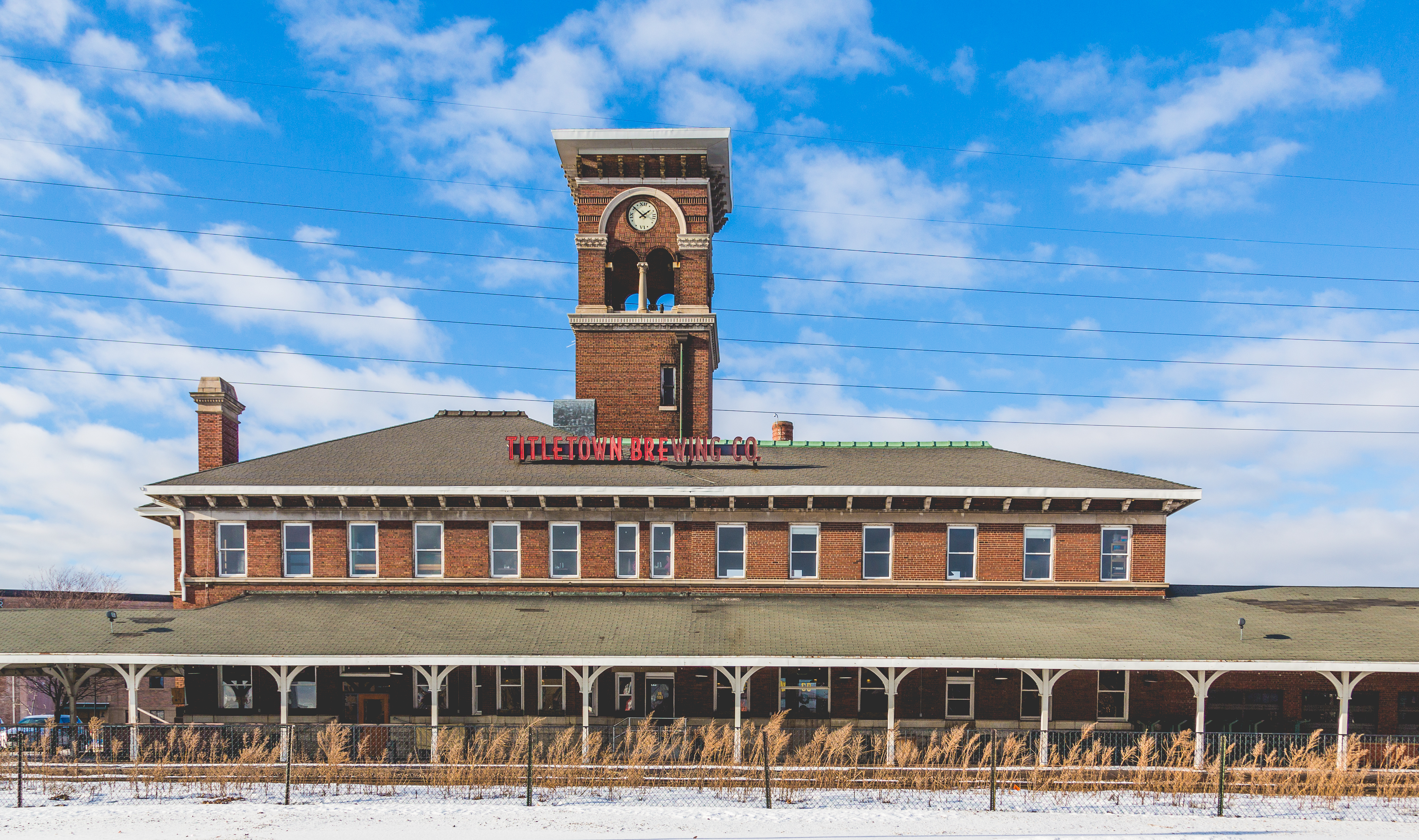
- The building in 2016

- Location within Wisconsin Location within the United States
- Location: Green Bay, Wisconsin, USA
- Coordinates: 44°31′11.64″N 88°1′2.28″W
- Architect: Charles Sumner Frost
- Architectural style: Italian Renaissance Revival
- NRHP reference No.: 99001633
- Added to NRHP: December 30, 1999
Location

The Chicago and North Western Railway Passenger Depot is a historic building located at 200 Dousman Street in the Broadway District of downtown Green Bay, Wisconsin, formerly served by the Chicago and North Western Railway. At its peak, it served trains such as the Flambeau 400 between Chicago and Ashland. The depot opened in 1899 and regular passenger service ended in 1971. The building was purchased by the Titletown Brewing company in 1996, although they moved out in 2021 . It was added to the National Register of Historic Places in 1999. The Wisconsin Central still uses the track for freight.

The depot is on the Packers Heritage Trail and is the location of the Receiver Statue. The station was used for the Green Bay Packers' first ever road trip to Ishpeming, Michigan, and other short trips within the Midwest.

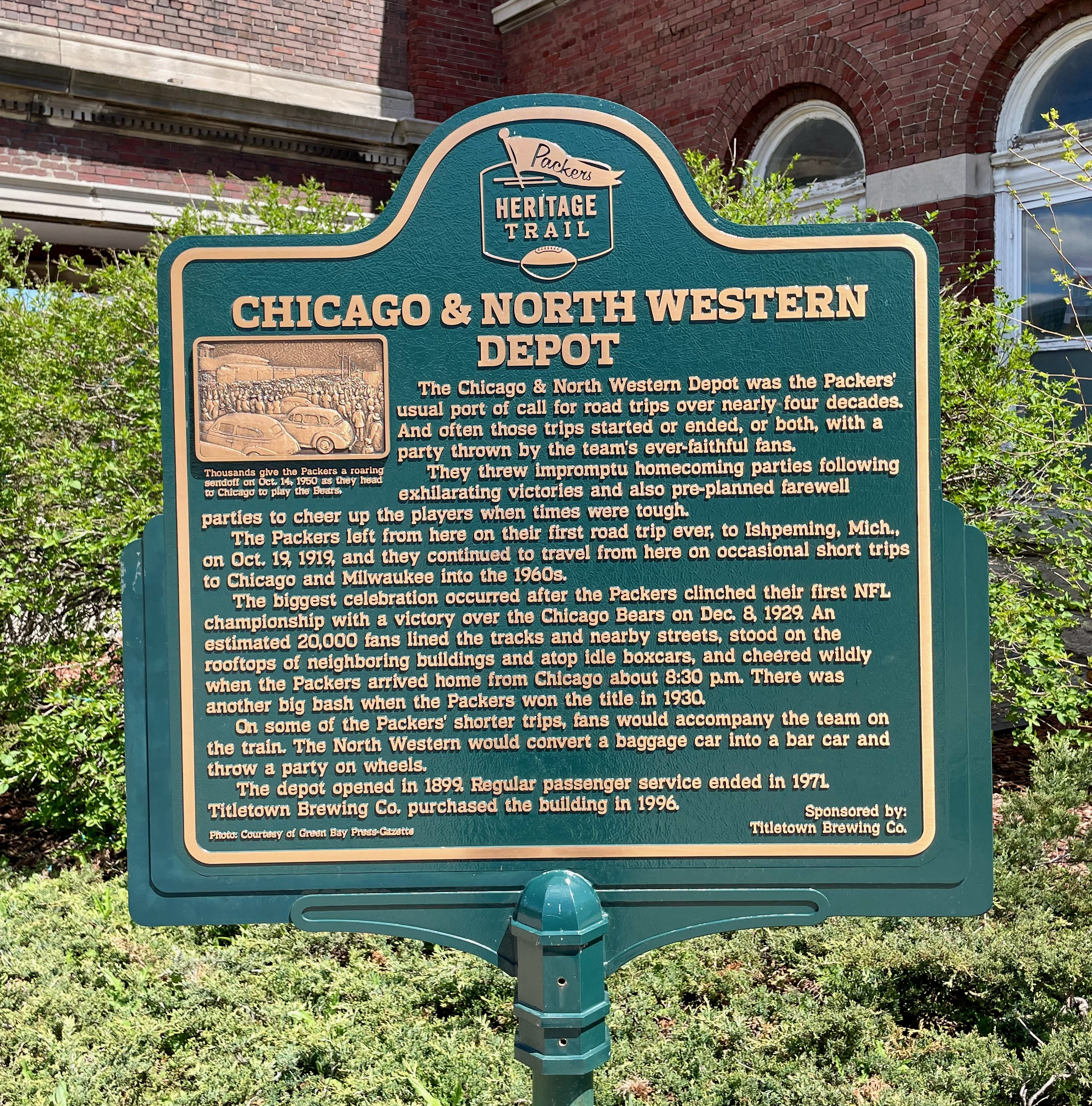
Packers Heritage Trail sign.

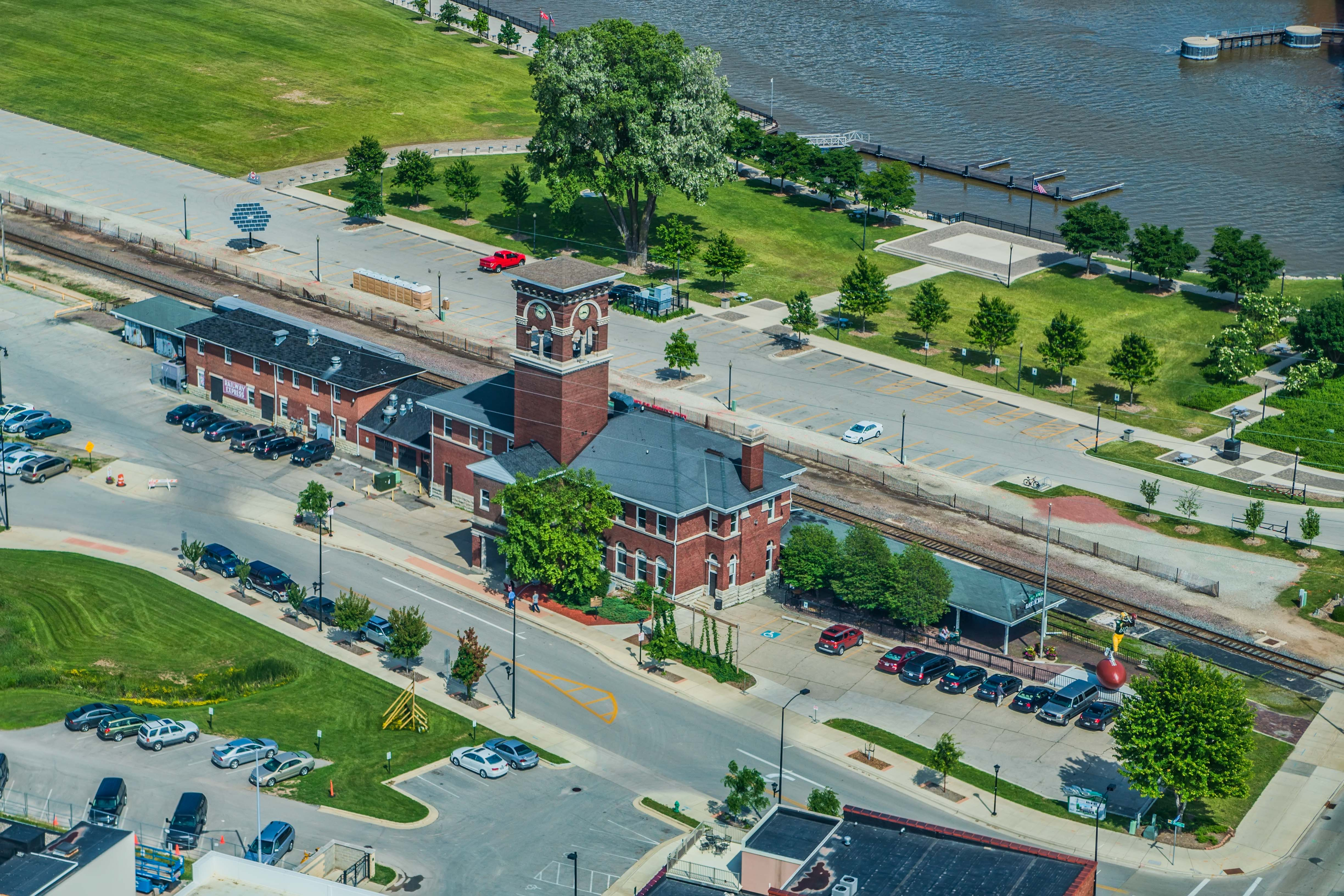
Aerial view of the station
