= Redfield, South Dakota =

Redfield
- City
- Motto: "...The Pheasant Capital Of The World!"
- Location in Spink County and the state of South Dakota
- Coordinates: 44°52′35″N 98°29′57″W
- Country: United States
- State: South Dakota
- County: Spink
- Incorporated: 1883

Area
  - Total: 1.96 sq mi (5.08 km^{2})
  - Land: 1.93 sq mi (4.99 km^{2})
  - Water: 0.035 sq mi (0.09 km^{2})
- Elevation: 1,303 ft (397 m)

Population (2020)
  - Total: 2,214
  - Density: 1,148/sq mi (443.3/km^{2})
- Time zone: UTC−6 (Central (CST))
  - Summer (DST): UTC−5 (CDT)
- ZIP code: 57469
- Area code: 605
- FIPS code: 46-53460
- GNIS feature ID: 1267547
- Website: City of Redfield

Redfield is a city in and the county seat of Spink County, South Dakota, United States. The population was 2,214 at the 2020 census. The city was named for J. B. Redfield, a railroad official.

== Geography ==
According to the United States Census Bureau, the city has a total area of 1.92 square miles (4.97 km^{2}), of which 1.89 square miles (4.90 km^{2}) is land and 0.03 square miles (0.08 km^{2}) is water.

== History ==
The first settlers arrived in the Redfield area in 1878, and a post office was established two years later under the name "Stennett Junction." The "Redfield" name was adopted in 1881. The town became the seat of Spink County in 1886, following a six-year legal and political battle among several Spink County towns. Redfield rapidly became a major town in the region, due in part to its status as a railroad center—the town was a crossroads of two lines of the Chicago and North Western Railway, and was also served by the Milwaukee Road Railroad. Railroads brought supplies, people, and animals, and also provided for transportation of crops back East.

Redfield College was established in the town in 1887, and operated until 1932. In 1902 the "Northern Hospital for the Insane," a state institution, opened on a campus just north of town. That facility remains in operation today as the South Dakota Developmental Center.

Redfield has been visited by three sitting Presidents of the United States: William McKinley in 1899, William Howard Taft in 1911, and Franklin D. Roosevelt in 1936.

== Demographics ==
Historical population
Census	Pop.	Note	%±
1890	796		—
1900	1,015		27.5%
1910	2,856		181.4%
1920	2,755		−3.5%
1930	2,664		−3.3%
1940	2,428		−8.9%
1950	2,655		9.3%
1960	2,952		11.2%
1970	2,943		−0.3%
1980	3,027		2.9%
1990	2,770		−8.5%
2000	2,897		4.6%
2010	2,333		−19.5%
2020	2,214		−5.1%
U.S. Decennial Census; 2018 Estimate

=== 2020 census ===
As of the 2020 census, Redfield had a population of 2,214. The median age was 48.1 years. 21.9% of residents were under the age of 18 and 27.1% of residents were 65 years of age or older. For every 100 females there were 91.9 males, and for every 100 females age 18 and over there were 86.5 males age 18 and over.

0.0% of residents lived in urban areas, while 100.0% lived in rural areas.

There were 1,033 households in Redfield, of which 22.0% had children under the age of 18 living in them. Of all households, 39.3% were married-couple households, 21.2% were households with a male householder and no spouse or partner present, and 33.0% were households with a female householder and no spouse or partner present. About 43.5% of all households were made up of individuals and 20.9% had someone living alone who was 65 years of age or older.

There were 1,158 housing units, of which 10.8% were vacant. The homeowner vacancy rate was 2.9% and the rental vacancy rate was 11.0%.

Racial composition as of the 2020 census
Race	Number	Percent
White	2,041	92.2%
Black or African American	22	1.0%
American Indian and Alaska Native	30	1.4%
Asian	2	0.1%
Native Hawaiian and Other Pacific Islander	0	0.0%
Some other race	35	1.6%
Two or more races	84	3.8%
Hispanic or Latino (of any race)	83	3.7%

=== 2010 census ===
As of the census of 2010, there were 2,333 people, 1,057 households, and 593 families living in the city. The population density was 1,234.4 inhabitants per square mile (476.6/km^{2}). There were 1,187 housing units at an average density of 628.0 per square mile (242.5/km^{2}). The racial makeup of the city was 96.9% White, 0.5% African American, 0.9% Native American, 0.1% Asian, 0.5% from other races, and 1.1% from two or more races. Hispanic or Latino of any race were 1.4% of the population.

There were 1,057 households, of which 25.4% had children under the age of 18 living with them, 43.3% were married couples living together, 8.9% had a female householder with no husband present, 3.9% had a male householder with no wife present, and 43.9% were non-families. 39.5% of all households were made up of individuals, and 21.2% had someone living alone who was 65 years of age or older. The average household size was 2.13 and the average family size was 2.82.

The median age in the city was 47.3 years. 22.4% of residents were under the age of 18; 5.8% were between the ages of 18 and 24; 19% were from 25 to 44; 26.7% were from 45 to 64; and 26.2% were 65 years of age or older. The gender makeup of the city was 46.7% male and 53.3% female.

=== 2000 census ===
As of the census of 2000, there were 2,897 people, 1,123 households, and 656 families living in the city. The population density was 1,670.3 inhabitants per square mile (644.9/km^{2}). There were 1,261 housing units at an average density of 727.1 per square mile (280.7/km^{2}). The racial makeup of the city was 95.37% White, 0.41% African American, 3.00% Native American, 0.10% Asian, 0.03% Pacific Islander, 0.21% from other races, and 0.86% from two or more races. Hispanic or Latino of any race were 0.66% of the population.

There were 1,123 households, out of which 26.2% had children under the age of 18 living with them, 46.9% were married couples living together, 8.6% had a female householder with no husband present, and 41.5% were non-families. 38.6% of all households were made up of individuals, and 23.2% had someone living alone who was 65 years of age or older. The average household size was 2.15 and the average family size was 2.87.

In the city, the population was spread out, with 21.3% under the age of 18, 7.8% from 18 to 24, 27.2% from 25 to 44, 20.0% from 45 to 64, and 23.7% who were 65 years of age or older. The median age was 41 years. For every 100 females, there were 106.8 males. For every 100 females age 18 and over, there were 104.2 males.

As of 2000 the median income for a household in the city was $27,743, and the median income for a family was $37,500. Males had a median income of $27,566 versus $20,938 for females. The per capita income for the city was $15,505. About 9.6% of families and 10.5% of the population were below the poverty line, including 9.9% of those under age 18 and 11.8% of those age 65 or over.

== Media ==
=== AM radio ===
AM radio stations
Frequency	Call sign	Name	Format	Owner	City
1380 AM	KQKD	KQ1380	Full Service	Gray Ghost Broadcasting LLC	Redfield

=== FM radio ===
FM radio stations
Frequency	Call sign	Name	Format	Owner	Target city/market	City of license
99.9 FM	K260DG	KQ1380	Full Service	Gray Ghost Broadcasting LLC	Redfield	Redfield

== Notable people ==
- Joseph Charron — Roman Catholic bishop
- Hallie Flanagan — director of the Federal Theatre Project.
- Mel Hansen — racing driver
- Carrie Ingalls — teacher and journalist for De Smet News
- Conde McCullough — bridge engineer
- Gene Roth — actor who appeared with The Three Stooges
- Arthur H. Parmelee — college football coach and physician
- Thomas J. Walsh — US senator from Montana
- Chuck Welke – educator and South Dakota state legislator
- Darwin Robinson — running back for the Washington Redskins and the Seattle Seahawks
