= List of archaeological sites in South Dakota =

According to the South Dakota State Historical Society's Archaeological Research Center, over 26,000 archaeological sites have been recorded in the U.S. state of South Dakota.

This list is broken down by county and encompasses sites across all of what is now South Dakota. Only notable sites are listed. Each table consists of the site's common name; the nearest locality; if given, its Smithsonian trinomial (SITS) and National Register of Historic Places (NRHP) reference number; associated period or culture; and any further notes, including where a property is listed on the NRHP as a National Historic Landmark, or part of a Multiple Property Submission (MPS), Multiple Resource Area (MRA), or Thematic Resource (TR).

== Beadle ==
| Name | SITS | NRHP | Nearest locality | Associations | Notes |
|---|---|---|---|---|---|
| | 39BE2 | #93001063 | Wessington Springs | | Prehistoric Rock Art of South Dakota MPS |
| | 39BE3 | #93000802 | Wolsey | | Prehistoric Rock Art of South Dakota MPS |
| | 39BE14 | #84003199 | Huron | | James River Basin Woodland Sites TR |
| | 39BE15 | #84003201 | Huron | | James River Basin Woodland Sites TR |
| | 39BE23 | #84003206 | Huron | | James River Basin Woodland Sites TR |
| | 39BE46 | #84003208 | Huron | | James River Basin Woodland Sites TR |
| | 39BE48 | #84003210 | Huron | | James River Basin Woodland Sites TR |
| | 39BE57 | #84003212 | Yale | | James River Basin Woodland Sites TR |
| | 39BE64 | #84003215 | Yale | | James River Basin Woodland Sites TR |

== Buffalo ==
| Name | SITS | NRHP | Nearest locality | Associations | Notes |
|---|---|---|---|---|---|
| Crow Creek Site | 39BF11 | #66000710 | Chamberlain | Middle Missouri | National Historic Landmark relating to Crow Creek massacre |
| Farm School site | 39BF220 | | Fort Thompson | | Site partially lost under the Missouri River |
| Fire Cloud site | 39BF237 | | Fort Thompson | | Cache pit containing ceramics, likely early 18th century |
| Fort Thompson Archeological District | | #86002738 | Fort Thompson | | Big Bend Area MRA |
| Fort Thompson Mounds | | | Fort Thompson | Plains Woodland | National Historic Landmark District |
| Old Quarry Mound | 39BF234 | | | | Burial mound complex |
| Side Hill site | 39BF233 | | | | Burial mound complex |
| Sitting Crow site | 39BF225 | | | | Burial mound complex |
| Talking Crow Archeological Site | 39BF3 | #03000505 | Fort Thompson | | |
| Two Teeth site | 39BF204 | | | | |

== Campbell ==
| Name | SITS | NRHP | Nearest locality | Associations | Notes |
|---|---|---|---|---|---|
| Vanderbilt Archeological Site | | #97000342 | Pollock | | National Historic Landmark |

== Corson ==
| Name | SITS | NRHP | Nearest locality | Associations | Cultures | Notes |
|---|---|---|---|---|---|---|
| | 39CO39 | #93000765 | Mahto | | | Cairn and rock art site; Prehistoric Rock Art of South Dakota MPS |

== Custer ==
| Name | SITS | NRHP | Nearest locality | Associations | Notes |
|---|---|---|---|---|---|
| | 39CU70 | #93001039 | Custer | | Rock art site; Prehistoric Rock Art of South Dakota MPS |
| Scored Rocks | 39CU91 | #82004759 | | Protohistoric (Lakota) | Rock art site, depicts guns; Rock Art in the Southern Black Hills TR |
| | 39CU510 | #82004752 | | | Rock art site; Rock Art in the Southern Black Hills TR |
| | 39CU511 | #82004754 | | | Rock art site; Rock Art in the Southern Black Hills TR |
| | 39CU512 | #82004753 | | | Rock art site; Rock Art in the Southern Black Hills TR |
| | 39CU513 | #82004755 | | | Rock art site; Rock Art in the Southern Black Hills TR |
| | 39CU514 | #82004756 | | | Rock art site; Rock Art in the Southern Black Hills TR |
| | 39CU515 | #82004757 | | | Rock art site; Rock Art in the Southern Black Hills TR |
| | 39CU516 | #82004758 | | | Rock art site; Rock Art in the Southern Black Hills TR |
| | 39CU890 | #93000803 | Hermosa | | Rock art site; Prehistoric Rock Art of South Dakota MPS |
| | 39CU1619 | #99000679 | Custer | | Cairn and stone circle site |
| | 39CU2565 | #16000047 | Dewey | | Rock art site |
| | 39CU3178 | #16000048 | Dewey | | Rock art site |
| | 39CU3393 | #16000049 | Dewey | | Rock art site |
| | 39CU4164 | #16000050 | Dewey | | Rock art site |

== Davison ==
| Name | SITS | NRHP | Nearest locality | Associations | Notes |
|---|---|---|---|---|---|
| Mitchell Site | 39DV2 | #66000712 | Mitchell | Mississippian culture | Open to the public |
| | 39DV9 | #84003275 | Riverside | | James River Basin Woodland Sites TR |
| | 39DV24 | #84003260 | Mitchell | | James River Basin Woodland Sites TR |

== Fall River ==
Numerous archeological sites in Fall River County were listed on the National Register of Historic Places in batches in 1982, 1993, 2005 and 2016. These were deemed significant for their information potential. In most cases, the specific locations of these sites are not disclosed, but their general regions are.

| Name | SITS | NRHP | Nearest locality | Associations | Notes |
|---|---|---|---|---|---|
| | 39FA86 | #93000804 | Edgemont | Plains Village | Rock art site including inscription(s) by member(s) of the 1874 Black Hills Expedition; Prehistoric Rock Art of South Dakota MPS |
| | 39FA88 | #93001040 | Edgemont | Ponca | Rock art site; rock shelter and cave site; Prehistoric Rock Art of South Dakota MPS |
| | 39FA89 | #93000806 | Edgemont | | Rock art site; Prehistoric Rock Art of South Dakota MPS |
| | 39FA90 | #93001041 | Edgemont | | Rock art site, rock shelter and cave site; Prehistoric Rock Art of South Dakota MPS |
| | 39FA99 | #93001042 | Edgemont | | Rock art site; Prehistoric Rock Art of South Dakota MPS |
| | 39FA243 | #93001043 | Edgemont | | Rock art site, rock shelter and cave site; Prehistoric Rock Art of South Dakota MPS |
| | 39FA244 | #93001044 | Edgemont | | Rock art site; Prehistoric Rock Art of South Dakota MPS |
| | 39FA316 | #93001045 | Edgemont | | Rock art site, including painted rock art; Prehistoric Rock Art of South Dakota MPS |
| | 39FA321 | #93001046 | Edgemont | Ponca | Rock art site; Prehistoric Rock Art of South Dakota MPS |
| | 39FA395 | #93001047 | Edgemont | Middle Archaic (McKean complex) | "Pecked Realistic" rock art; a rock shelter and cave site; Prehistoric Rock Art of South Dakota MPS |
| | 39FA446 | #93001048 | Edgemont | | Rock art site; Prehistoric Rock Art of South Dakota MPS |
| | 39FA447 | #93001049 | Edgemont | | Rock art site; Prehistoric Rock Art of South Dakota MPS |
| | 39FA448 | #93001050 | Edgemont | | Rock art site; rock shelter and cave site; Prehistoric Rock Art of South Dakota MPS |
| | 39FA542 | #93001051 | Edgemont | | Rock art site; Prehistoric Rock Art of South Dakota MPS |
| | 39FA678 | #93000801 | Edgemont | | Rock art site; Prehistoric Rock Art of South Dakota MPS |
| | 39FA679 | #93001052 | Edgemont | | Rock art site; Prehistoric Rock Art of South Dakota MPS |
| | 39FA680 | #93001053 | Edgemont | | Rock art site; Prehistoric Rock Art of South Dakota MPS |
| | 39FA682 | #93001054 | Edgemont | | Rock art site; Prehistoric Rock Art of South Dakota MPS |
| | 39FA683 | #93001055 | Edgemont | | Rock art site; rock shelter and cave site; Prehistoric Rock Art of South Dakota MPS |
| | 39FA686 | #93001056 | Edgemont | | Rock art site; rock shelter and cave site; Prehistoric Rock Art of South Dakota MPS |
| | 39FA688 | #93001057 | Edgemont | | Rock art site; rock shelter and cave site; Prehistoric Rock Art of South Dakota MPS |
| | 39FA690 | #93001058 | Edgemont | | Rock art site; Prehistoric Rock Art of South Dakota MPS |
| | 39FA691 | #93001059 | Edgemont | Late Prehistoric | Rock art site; Prehistoric Rock Art of South Dakota MPS |
| | 39FA767 | #93001060 | Edgemont | | Rock art site; rock shelter and cave site; Prehistoric Rock Art of South Dakota MPS |
| | 39FA788 | #93001061 | Edgemont | | Rock art site; Prehistoric Rock Art of South Dakota MPS |
| | 39FA806 | #93000790 | Hot Springs | | Rock art site; Prehistoric Rock Art of South Dakota MPS |
| | 39FA819 | #93001062 | Edgemont | | Prehistoric Rock Art of South Dakota MPS |
| | 39FA1010 | #93001063 | Hot Springs | Late Archaic | Prehistoric Rock Art of South Dakota MPS |
| | 39FA1013 | #93001064 | | | |
| | 39FA1046 | #93001065 | | | |
| | 39FA1049 | #93000791 | | | |
| | 39FA1093 | #93001066 | | | |
| | 39FA1152 | #93001067 | | | |
| | 39FA1154 | #93001068 | | | |
| | 39FA1155 | #93001069 | | | |
| | 39FA1190 | #93001070 | | | |
| | 39FA1201 | #93000792 | | | |
| | 39FA1204 | #93001071 | | | |
| | 39FA1336 | #05000690 | | | |
| | 39FA1337 | #05000689 | | | |
| | 39FA1638 | #05000691 | | | |
| | 39FA2530 | #16000051 | | | |
| | 39FA2531 | #16000052 | | | |
| | 39FA7 | #82004771 | | | |
| | 39FA58 | #82004765 | | | |
| | 39FA75 | #82004760 | | | |
| | 39FA79 | #82004772 | | | |
| | 39FA91 | #82004773 | | | |
| | 39FA94 | #82004774 | | | |
| | 39FA277 | #82004761 | | | |
| | 39FA389 | #82004762 | | | |
| | 39FA554 | #82004764 | | | |
| | 39FA676 | #82004766 | | | |
| | 39FA677 | #82004767 | | | |
| | 39FA681 | #82004769 | | | |
| | 39FA684 | #82004768 | | | Pecked rock art |
| | 39FA685 | #82004906 | | | |
| | 39FA687 | #82004770 | | | |
| | 39FA1303 | #05000587 | | | |
| | 39FA1639 | #05000586 | | | |

== Hand ==
| Name | SITS | NRHP | Nearest locality | Associations | Notes |
|---|---|---|---|---|---|
| | 39HD22 | #84003296 | Danforth | | |

== Hanson ==
| Name | SITS | NRHP | Nearest locality | Associations | Notes |
|---|---|---|---|---|---|
| Bloom Site | 39HS1 | #66000714 | Bloom | | National Historic Landmark |
| | 39HS3 | #84003294 | Mitchell | | |
| Fort James | 39HS48 | #84003290 | Rosedale Colony | Historic (1865–1867) | U.S. Government fort |
| Sheldon Reese Site | 39HS23 | #84003292 | Mitchell | | |

== Harding ==
| Name | SITS | NRHP | Nearest locality | Associations | Notes |
|---|---|---|---|---|---|
| Ludlow Cave | 39HN1 | #94000108 | | Early Archaic (Note: Some Early Archaic projectile points were recovered, but they seem to have been carried to the site by later peoples.); Late Archaic; Plains Village (Middle Missouri); Late Prehistoric (Avonlea culture, McKean complex); Protohistoric (Arikara, Mandan) | A multiple-component ceremonial rock art site in North Cave Hills including projectile points, a rock shelter/cave, turtle effigies, and petroforms (now destroyed). |
| | 39HN5 | #94000109 | | | |
| | 39HN17 | #93000805 | | | |
| | 39HN18 | #94000088 | | | |
| | 39HN21 | #94000124 | | | |
| | 39HN22 | #94000123 | | | |
| | 39HN26 | #94000122 | | | |
| | 39HN30 | #94000121 | | | |
| | 39HN50 | #94000119 | | | |
| | 39HN53 | #94000118 | | | |
| | 39HN54 | #94000120 | | | |
| | 39HN121 | #94000117 | | | |
| | 39HN150 | #94000114 | | | |
| | 39HN155 | #94000115 | | | |
| | 39HN159 | #94000116 | | | |
| | 39HN160 | #94000113 | | | |
| | 39HN162 | #94000091 | | | |
| | 39HN165 | #94000093 | | | |
| | 39HN167 | #94000092 | | | |
| | 39HN168 | #94000129 | | | |
| | 39HN171 | #94000128 | | | |
| | 39HN174 | #94000127 | | | |
| | 39HN177 | #94000126 | | | |
| | 39HN198 | #94000125 | | | |
| | 39HN199 | #94000110 | | | |
| Lightning Spring | 39HN204 | #82003930 | Ludlow | Middle Archaic; Late Archaic (Pelican Lake complex); Plains Woodland; Plains Village; Late Prehistoric (Avonlea culture, Duncan phase, McKean complex) | In Sandstone Buttes area |
| | 39HN205 | #94000095 | | | |
| | 39HN207 | #94000094 | | | |
| | 39HN208 | #93000794 | | | |
| | 39HN209 | #94000107 | | | |
| | 39HN210 | #94000106 | | | |
| | 39HN213 | #94000105 | | | |
| | 39HN217 | #94000104 | | | |
| | 39HN218 | #94000103 | | | |
| | 39HN219 | #94000102 | | | |
| | 39HN227 | #94000111 | | | |
| | 39HN228 | #94000112 | | | |
| | 39HN232 | #94000101 | | | |
| | 39HN234 | #94000100 | | | |
| | 39HN484 | #94000098 | | | |
| | 39HN485 | #94000099 | | | |
| | 39HN486 | #94000097 | | | |
| | 39HN487 | #94000096 | | | |

== Hughes ==
| Name | SITS | NRHP | Nearest locality | Associations | Notes |
|---|---|---|---|---|---|
| Arzberger site | | #66000715 | | | National Historic Landmark, on bluff above McClure site |
| Cedar Islands Archeological District | | #86002739 | | | |
| Fort George Creek Archeological District | | #86002741 | | | Part of Big Bend Area MRA |
| McClure site | 39HU7 | #86002732 | | | Part of Big Bend Area MRA |
| Medicine Creek Archeological District | | #86002740 | | | Has 21 contributing sites including a village site. Partially in Lyman County |
| Old Fort Sully | 39HU52 | #86002731 | | Historic (1863–1866) | U.S. Government fort |
| | 39HU66 | #84003297 | | | Part of the Petroforms of South Dakota Thematic Resource (TR) |
| | 39HU189 | #84003307 | | | Part of the Petroforms of South Dakota TR |
| | 39HU201 | #84003308 | | | Part of the Petroforms of South Dakota TR |

== Hutchinson ==
| Name | SITS | NRHP | Nearest locality | Associations | Notes |
|---|---|---|---|---|---|
| | 39HT14 | #84003320 | Olivet | Plains Woodland | Mound site |
| | 39HT27 | #84003323 | | Plains Woodland | Mound site |
| | 39HT29 | #84003325 | Clayton | Plains Woodland | Mound site |
| | 39HT30; 39HT202 | #84003327 | Clayton | Plains Woodland (Randall phase) | Mound site |

== Hyde ==
| Name | SITS | NRHP | Nearest locality | Associations | Notes |
|---|---|---|---|---|---|
| | 39HE331 | #93000793 | Holabird | | |

== Jackson ==
| Name | SITS | NRHP | Nearest locality | Associations | Notes |
|---|---|---|---|---|---|
| Lip's Camp | 39JK84 | #75002104 | Wanblee | Historic (Upper Brule Lakota) | In White River Badlands. Lakota site of the "Early Reservation Period", it was occupied 1880–1904 by the Wazhazha band of the Upper Brule. |

== Jerauld ==
| Name | SITS | NRHP | Nearest locality | Associations | Notes |
|---|---|---|---|---|---|
| | 39JE10 | #84003336 | Wessington Springs | | |
| | 39JE11 | #84003337 | Gann Valley | | |

== Lincoln ==
| Name | SITS | NRHP | Nearest locality | Associations | Notes |
|---|---|---|---|---|---|
| Blood Run Site | | #70000246 | | | On the Iowa/South Dakota border along the Big Sioux River, a National Historic Landmark |

== Lyman ==
| Name | SITS | NRHP | Nearest locality | Associations | Notes |
|---|---|---|---|---|---|
| Burnt Prairie Site | 39LM207 | #86002735 | Lower Brule | | |
| Crazy Bull site | 39LM220 | | Lower Brule | | |
| Deerfly site | 39LM39 | | Oacoma | Dakota | Late 19th century occupation |
| Dinehart Village Archeological Site | | #03000501 | Oacoma | | |
| Fort Lookout IV | | #90001940 | Oacoma | | |
| Jiggs Thompson Site | 39LM208 | #86002734 | Lower Brule | | |
| King Archaeological Site | | #03000502 | Oacoma | | |
| Langdeau Site | 39LM209 | #66000717 | Lower Brule | | National Historic Landmark |
| Meander site | 39LM201 | | Oacoma | | |
| Medicine Creek Archeological District | | #86002740 | | | Has 21 contributing sites including a village site. Partially in Hughes County |

== McCook ==
| Name | SITS | NRHP | Nearest locality | Associations | Notes |
|---|---|---|---|---|---|
| | 39MK12 | #93000796 | Bridgewater | | |

== McPherson ==
| Name | SITS | NRHP | Nearest locality | Associations | Notes |
|---|---|---|---|---|---|
| | 39MP3 | #93000795 | Long Lake | | Rock art panel likely depicting bison heads |

== Meade ==
| Name | SITS | NRHP | Nearest locality | Associations | Notes |
|---|---|---|---|---|---|
| | 39MD1; 39MD20 | #93000798 | | | Rock art site; has stone circle. The site is in the eastern foothills of the Black Hills "lying in a deep arroyo"; the "rimrock above the arroyo contained a stone circle and a scatter of chipped stone artifacts"; the stone circle was "test excavated" and found, however, to have very little "chipping debris". |
| | 39MD81 | #93000818 | | | |
| | 39MD82 | #93000797 | | | |

== Minnehaha ==
| Name | SITS | NRHP | Nearest locality | Associations | Notes |
|---|---|---|---|---|---|
| Brandon Village | | #01000664 | Brandon | | |

== Pennington ==
| Name | SITS | NRHP | Nearest locality | Associations | Notes |
|---|---|---|---|---|---|
| | 39PN57 | #82004778 | | | Rock art site |
| | 39PN108 | #82004775 | | | Rock art site |
| Ice Cave | 39PN376 | #93001072 | | Paleoindian, Middle Archaic, Late Archaic, Late Prehistoric, Historic | Rock shelter cave site with red-painted hand prints |
| | 39PN438 | #82004776 | | | Rock art site |
| | 39PN439 | #82004777 | | | Rock art site |

== Potter ==
| Name | SITS | NRHP | Nearest locality | Associations | Notes |
|---|---|---|---|---|---|
| | 39PO63 | #93000800 | Gettysburg | | |
| | 39PO205 | #93000799 | Gettysburg | | |

== Roberts ==
| Name | SITS | NRHP | Nearest locality | Associations | Notes |
|---|---|---|---|---|---|
| Thunderbird Rock | 39RO71 | #05000588 | Sisseton | | |

== Sanborn ==
| Name | SITS | NRHP | Nearest locality | Associations | Notes |
|---|---|---|---|---|---|
| | 39SB15 | #84003384 | Mitchell | | |
| | 39SB18 | #84003397 | Forestburg | | |
| | 39SB31 | #84003399 | Forestburg | | |

== Spink ==
| Name | SITS | NRHP | Nearest locality | Associations | Notes |
|---|---|---|---|---|---|
| | 39SP2 | #84003408 | Frankfort | | |
| | 39SP4 | #05000590 | Tulare | | |
| | 39SP12 | #84003403 | Ashton | | |
| | 39SP19 | #84003405 | Spink Colony | | |
| | 39SP37 | #84003411 | Crandon | | |
| | 39SP46 | #84003413 | Crandon | | |

== Stanley ==
| Name | SITS | NRHP | Nearest locality | Associations | Notes |
|---|---|---|---|---|---|
| Antelope Creek Site | 39ST55 | #86002737 | Fort Pierre | | Big Bend Area MRA |
| Bloody Hand Site | 39ST230 | #86002736 | Fort Pierre | | Big Bend Area MRA |
| Fort Pierre Chouteau | | #76001756 | Fort Pierre | Historic | National Historic Landmark |
| Fort Pierre II | 39ST217 | #88000732 | Fort Pierre | | |

== Sully ==
| Name | SITS | NRHP | Nearest locality | Associations | Notes |
|---|---|---|---|---|---|
| Cooper Village Archeological Site | | #03000504 | Onida | | |

== Turner ==
| Name | SITS | NRHP | Nearest locality | Associations | Notes |
|---|---|---|---|---|---|
| | 39TU5 | #84003417 | Freeman | | At Turkey Ridge. Petroform site, includes a thunderbird effigy "said to mark the campsite of a leader named Swan, according to Northern Cheyenne oral tradition" in 1750–1825 era. |

== Walworth ==
| Name | SITS | NRHP | Nearest locality | Associations | Notes |
|---|---|---|---|---|---|
| Gravel Pit Site | 39WW203 | #86000834 | Mobridge | | |

== See also ==
- History of South Dakota
- National Register of Historic Places listings in South Dakota
- Paleontology in South Dakota
- Plains Indians
- Prehistoric agriculture on the Great Plains
