= Talking Crow Archeological Site =

Archaeological site in South Dakota, United States

- U.S. National Register of Historic Places
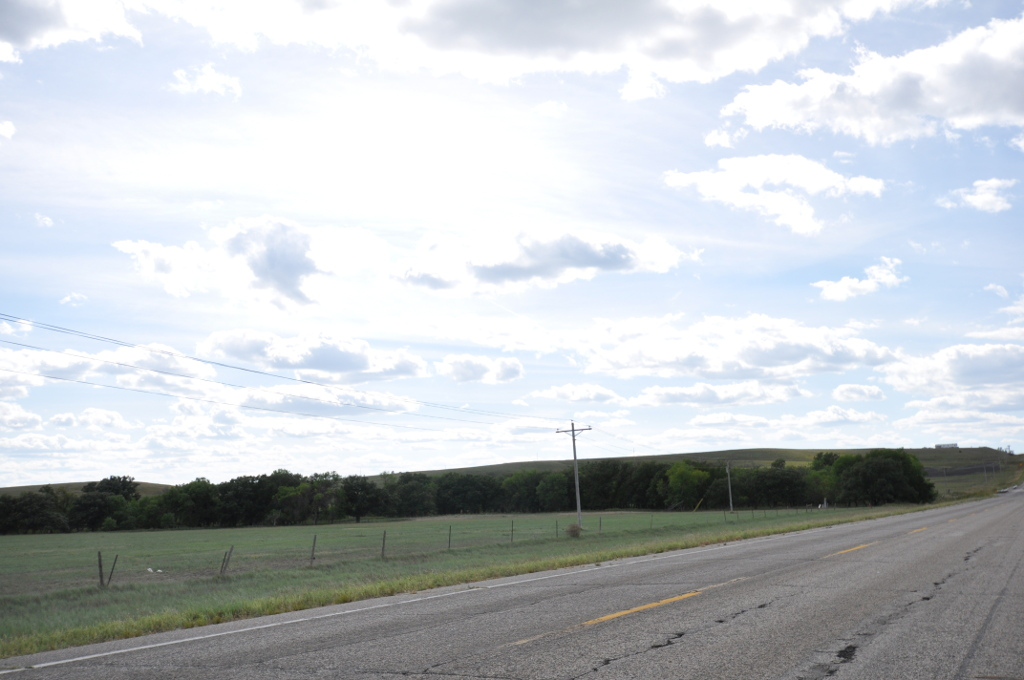
- Vicinity of the Talking Crow site
- Location: Address restricted Buffalo County, South Dakota, United States
- Nearest city: Fort Thompson
- Area: 12.3 acres (5.0 ha)
- NRHP reference No.: 03000505
- Added to NRHP: June 2, 2003

Talking Crow (SITS 39BF3) is an archaeological site near Fort Thompson in Buffalo County, South Dakota, United States. It is an earth lodge village used by both the Arikara and Dakota, in multiple occupation phases between about AD 600 and 1950. It was listed on the National Register of Historic Places on June 2, 2003.

== Location ==
Talking Crow is located about 6 miles (9.7 km) north of Fort Thompson in Buffalo County, South Dakota. It is on the banks of Campbell Creek near its confluence with the Missouri River, on the west side of State Highway 47. It is situated on a high bluff overlooking the river.

== History ==
Archaeologist Carlyle Smith first noted the site during a 1938 survey. The first excavations at the site were carried out between 1950 and 1952 by the University of Kansas. These excavations yielded over 56,000 pottery sherds. It was first described by archaeologist Carlyle Smith in 1951, who identified the occupation as historical Arikara.

The site was listed on the National Register of Historic Places on June 2, 2003.

== Site ==
The site is a fortified earth lodge village that was occupied by various groups over several centuries. It was first inhabited during the Plains Woodland period around AD 600, during the Initial Coalescent Variant around 1425–1450, during the Extended Coalescent Variant about 1725–1750, and then post-European contact by the Dakota around 1865–1950. Smith speculated that the Coalescent occupations were by Arikara.

The exact number of houses at the site is undetermined; during the 1950s excavations, at least 22 houses were unearthed. By 1980, 12 houses had been entirely excavated, 15 others identified, and several others noted by visible depressions in the ground. The total population during the Initial Coalescent period is estimated around 200. Its residents likely engaged in agriculture as well as bison hunting and lived at the site year-round.

=== Fortifications ===
The village is surrounded by a fortification ditch, which varies between 10 ft (3.0 m) to 20 ft (6.1 m) wide, and partially lined by a wooden stockade and raised earth mound. As with most villages settled in the Initial Coalestent period, Talking Crow is situated in a highly-defensible area; its position high on a bluff overlooking the flood plain would have provided a good vantage point of its environs.

Due to its proximity to the contemporary Crow Creek site, some archaeologists speculate that the Talking Crow inhabitants could have participated in the massacre there; however, some researchers believe this unlikely due to Talking Crow's much smaller size, rendering its residents unable to overwhelm the approximately 1,500 at Crow Creek. Other researchers believe Talking Crow was not settled at the exact time of the massacre.

=== Pottery ===
Several pottery types have been identified at the Talking Crow site, the main two being the eponymous Talking Crow and Campbell Creek.

Some of the sherds contain the only known drawings of living beings from Great Plains archaeological sites. The human figures have the same "small featureless dome-shaped heads and stick-like appendages" common among Great Plains artwork. Other animal representations include a possible salamander, the head of a snake, and a bear paw print.

== See also ==
- List of archaeological sites in South Dakota
