= National Register of Historic Places listings in Lyman County, South Dakota =

Location of Lyman County in South Dakota

This is a list of the National Register of Historic Places listings in Lyman County, South Dakota.

This is intended to be a complete list of the properties and districts on the National Register of Historic Places in Lyman County, South Dakota, United States. The locations of National Register properties and districts for which the latitude and longitude coordinates are included below, may be seen in a map.

There are 9 properties and districts listed on the National Register in the county, including 1 National Historic Landmark.

This National Park Service list is complete through NPS recent listings posted July 10, 2026.

== Current listings ==
	Name on the Register	Image	Date listed	Location	City or town	Description
1	Burnt Prairie Site (39LM207)	Burnt Prairie Site (39LM207)	August 14, 1986 (#86002735)	Address restricted	Lower Brule	
2	Dinehart Village Archeological Site	Dinehart Village Archeological Site	June 2, 2003 (#03000501)	Address restricted	Oacoma	
3	Fort Lookout IV	Fort Lookout IV	December 31, 1990 (#90001940)	Address restricted	Oacoma	
4	Iron Nation's Gravesite	Iron Nation's Gravesite	February 24, 2014 (#14000032)	Messiah Cemetery, Iron Nation District, Lower Brule Sioux Reservation; 44°06′03″N 99°44′15″W	Lower Brule	
5	Jiggs Thompson Site (39LM208)	Jiggs Thompson Site (39LM208)	August 14, 1986 (#86002734)	Address restricted	Lower Brule	
6	King Archeological Site	King Archeological Site	June 2, 2003 (#03000502)	Address restricted	Oacoma	
7	Langdeau Site	Langdeau Site	October 15, 1966 (#66000717)	Address restricted	Lower Brule	
8	Medicine Creek Archeological District	Medicine Creek Archeological District	August 14, 1986 (#86002740)	Address restricted	Lower Brule	Extends into Hughes County
9	Edgar Vernon House		March 30, 1978 (#78002562)	Off U.S. Route 16; 43°54′29″N 100°03′02″W	Presho	

== Former listings ==
	Name on the Register	Image	Date listed	Date removed	Location	City or town	Description
1	Lower Brule Agency House		November 21, 1980 (#80003728)	September 17, 2008	1st St. and Lichtenstein Ave.	Oacoma	Destroyed by arsonist on July 30, 2008.

== See also ==
- List of National Historic Landmarks in South Dakota
- National Register of Historic Places listings in South Dakota
