= McClure site =

- McClure Site (39HU7)
- U.S. National Register of Historic Places
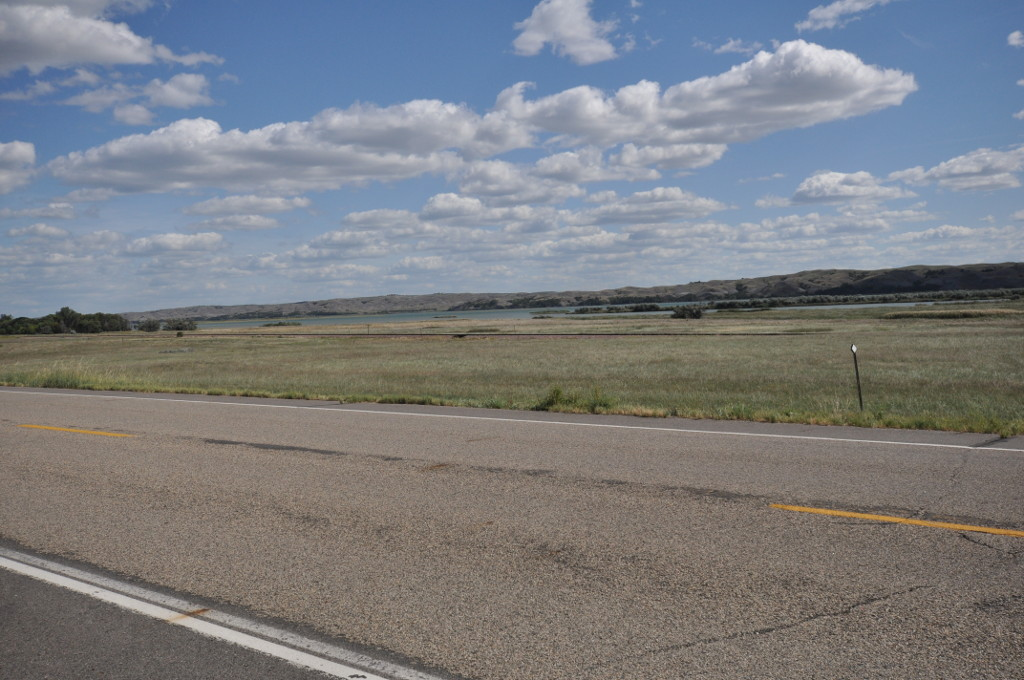
- Vicinity of the McClure Site
- Location: Address restricted
- Nearest city: Pierre, South Dakota
- Area: 23 acres (9.3 ha)
- MPS: Big Bend Area MRA
- NRHP reference No.: 86002732
- Added to NRHP: August 14, 1986

The McClure Site (SITS 39HU7), formerly called the McClure Ranch, McClure Village, or Arzberger Bottoms Village is an archaeological site in rural Harding County, South Dakota, United States, containing an earth lodge village inhabited by the early Arikara during the late 17th century. It was listed on the National Register of Historic Places in 1986.

== Location ==
The McClure Site is located about 6 miles (9.7 km) east of Pierre in rural Harding County, South Dakota, bisected by South Dakota Highway 34. It is close to Lake Sharpe on the Missouri River, situated on a slight hill above the floodplain. It sits just below another earth lodge village, the Arzberger site.

== Archaeology ==
The McClure Site was first described by W.H. Over in a local 1946 archaeological survey. Several small excavations were carried out and material collected over the years. During the summer of 1965, it was excavated as part of a salvage archaeology operation preceding the creation of the Big Bend Dam, which would flood the vicinity under Lake Sharpe. Although the site itself was not in imminent danger of inundation, excavations were still carried out due to its potential for archaeological importance.

The remains of about 35 earth lodges have been counted at the site, today only slight depressions in the ground. Most of the houses exist south of Highway 34, but some are on the north side of the road. This could have supported a population of about 500–600 people. The site likely dates to about AD 1690–1700. A lack of fortification around the site may suggest the time it was inhabited was relatively peaceful.CITEREFJohnston1982f

The 1965 excavations counted 5,155 specimens of various artifacts, 95% of which were potsherds. Other artifacts included stone and bone tools and four metal fragments. The bone tools included hoes and knives crafted from the scapulae of bison and awls; stone tools included projectile points, hammering stones, blades, scrapers, and knives. One copper bead was also found.

A burial containing one skeleton was uncovered during the 1965 excavation. One skeleton was under the floor of one of the houses and was positioned sitting upright and facing east. Anthropological analysis determined that the remains were those of a female, about 25 to 35 years old at death, who likely stood just over 5'0" tall. Her skeletal measurements suggested she was of early or ancestral Arikara descent.

== See also ==
- List of archaeological sites in South Dakota
