= Caddoan village bundle =

Native American ceremonial bundle

A village bundle is a bundle or basket filled with ceremonial objects. It represents the spiritual and social organization of the village or community to which it belongs. These are associated with Native American groups including the Caddoan farming villages. The bundle is possessed by an individual, but the power it contains binds the group together.

For groups such as the Arikara and the Pawnee, the bundle was a skin envelope with objects inside that could symbolize ideologies and rituals. It is a physical representation of how the people view their world. These objects showed how the keeper of the bundle was descended directly from the original bundle-keeper, all of whom keep the bundles at their homes to be cared for by their wives. In general, the knowledge of the bundle was not common knowledge, but possessed by a priest who would slowly pass this knowledge on to a younger relative, who could carry on the knowledge after his death. The powers represented and contained in the bundle assured the survival of the village and therefore the universe. It controlled all production and social relations, so that if the bundle was lost or destroyed, the people of the village would die. While in ideological terms the bundles may maintain the universe, in literal terms, they were very powerful symbols that helped maintain the chief and ensure the loyalty of his people.
