= Timeline of North American prehistory =

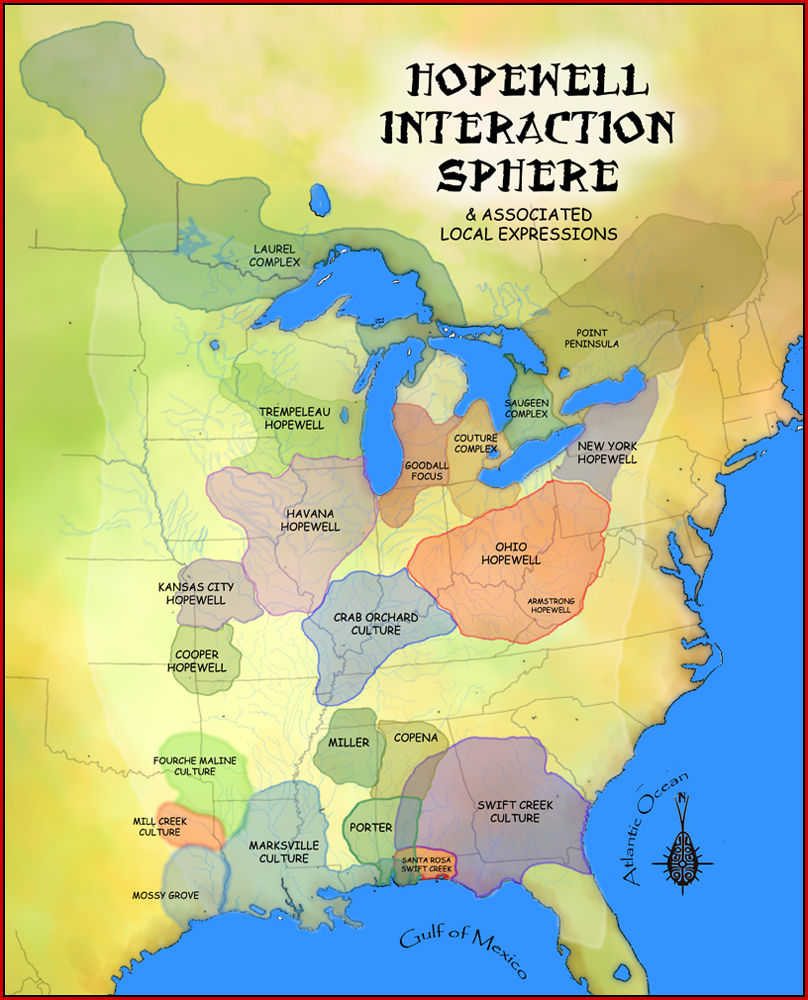
Hopewell Interaction Area and local expressions of the Hopewell tradition

This is a timeline of North American prehistory, from 1000 BC until European contact.

== Timeline ==
- 1000 BC–800 AD: The Norton tradition develops in the Western Arctic along the Alaskan shore of the Bering Strait.
- 1000 BC: Athapaskan-speaking natives arrive in Alaska and northwestern North America, possibly from Siberia.
- 1000 BC: Pottery making widespread in the Eastern Woodlands.
- 1000 BC–100 AD: Adena culture takes form in the Ohio River valley, carving fine stone pipes placed with their dead in gigantic burial mounds. See Prehistory of Ohio.
- c. 800 BC: Adena people erect earthworks and mounds in present-day Ohio, Indiana, Kentucky, West Virginia, and Pennsylvania.
- 500–1 BC: Basketmaker phase of early Ancestral Pueblo culture begins in the American Southwest.
- 500 BC–AD 1000: Plains Woodland period on the Great Plains.
- 300 BC: Mogollon people, possibly descended from the Cochise tradition, appear in southeast Arizona and southwest New Mexico.
- 100 BC: Walrus ivory is carved into Okvik figures, other ornaments, and implements on the St. Lawrence and Punuk Islands in the Bering Strait; semi-subterranean houses are built.
- 100 BC–500 AD: The Hopewell tradition begins flourishing in much of the East, with copper mining centered in the Great Lakes region.
- 1 BC: Some central and eastern prairie peoples learned to raise crops and shape pottery from the mound builders to their east.
- 500 BC–700 AD: Old Bering Sea culture thrives in the western Arctic
- 50 BC–800 AD: Ipiutak culture thrives in the western Arctic.
- 1 AD: Some central and eastern prairie peoples learned to raise crops and shape pottery from the mound builders to their east.
- 100–1000: Weeden Island culture flourishes in coastal Florida. They are known for their extraordinarily well-preserved wood carvings.
- 200: The Adena culture of the Ohio River valley evolves into the Hopewellian exchange.
- 200–800: Late Eastern Woodlands cultures flourish in the Eastern North America.
- 200–1450: Hohokam cultures flourish in Arizona and north Mexico
- 400: Cultivation of maize (corn) begins in the American Southeastern Woodlands and soon reaches the Northeastern Woodlands. Originally domesticated in Mesoamerica, maize transforms the Eastern Agricultural Complex.
- 400: Ancestral Pueblo peoples of the American Southwest weave extraordinarily long nets for trapping small animals and make yucca fibers into large sacks and bags.
- 500: Late Basketmaker II Era phase of Ancestral Pueblo culture diminishes in the American Southwest.
- 700: Basketmaker III Era of the American Southwest evolve into the early Pueblo culture.
- 755±65 – 890±65: likely dates of the Blythe Geoglyphs being sculpted by ancestral Quechan and Mojave peoples in the Colorado Desert, California
- 700–800: Ancestral Pueblo people of the American Southwest or Oasisamerica transition from pit houses to multi-story adobe and stone apartments called pueblos.
- 800–1500: Mississippian culture spawns powerful chiefdoms of great agricultural Moundbuilders throughout the Eastern woodlands.
- 875: Patayan people begin farming along the Colorado River valley in western Arizona and eastern California.
- 900: Earliest event recorded in the Battiste Good (1821–22, Sicangu Lakota) Winter count.
- c. 900–1150: Ancestral Pueblo culture dominates much of the American Southwest. During this time, it was generally classed as the Pueblo II Period.
- 900: American Southwestern tribes trade with Indigenous peoples of Mexico to obtain copper bells cast through the lost-wax technique.
- 915 (exact date): Construction begins at Pueblo Bonito, the largest Ancestral Pueblo Great House.
- 1000: Discovery of Vinland by Leif Erikson and Norse colonization of North America.
- c. 1000–1050: Scandinavians briefly settled Vinland (likely l'Anse aux Meadows on the Canadian Maritime island of Newfoundland) early in the century and perhaps ventured as far south as New England.
- 1000–1200: Acoma Pueblo and Old Oraibi are established, become the oldest continuously inhabited communities in the United States
- 1000–1750: Fort Ancient culture, a non-Mississippian culture emerges in modern-day southern Ohio, northern Kentucky, southeastern Indiana, and western West Virginia.
- 1000–1780: Plains Village period on Great Plains, from North Dakota to Texas
- 1070: Great Serpent Mound built in Ohio.
- 1100: Pueblo Bonito in Chaco Canyon reaches apex in size at 800 rooms
- 1100: Hohokam culture reaches apex in present-day Arizona
- 1000–1200: Early Mississippian culture in the Eastern Woodlands
- 1000–1200: Acoma Pueblo and Old Oraibi are established, and become the oldest continuously inhabited communities in the United States
- 1142: League of the Iroquois is founded, and the Great Law of Peace is adopted by the Mohawk, Seneca, Cayuga, Onondaga, and Oneida people. Wampum invented by Ayenwatha, which the Haudenosaunee used to record information.
- 1150–1350: Pueblo III Period in the American Southwest.
- A large city of the Mississippian culture of mound builders, Cahokia on the Mississippi River opposite modern Saint Louis, Missouri, reached its peak size. It was the largest city in North America in the 12th century.
- 1150–1350: Ancestral Pueblo people are in their Pueblo III Period
- 1200: Construction begins on the Grand Village of the Natchez near Natchez, Mississippi. This ceremonial center for the Natchez people is occupied and built upon until the early 17th century.
- 1200–1400: Middle Mississippian culture flourishes in the Eastern Woodlands
- 1250: Pensacola culture emerges in Florida
- 1250: Cliff Palace, Mesa Verde, and other Ancestral Pueblo architectural complexes reach their apex
- c.1200–1300: The Inuit Thule people have completely displaced the old Dorset culture in Arctic Alaska.
- Pueblo people in the American Southwest evacuate most above-ground pueblos to build spectacular cliff dwellings housing hundreds of people.
- The dominant Ancestral Pueblo begin gradually absorbing the Mongollon culture in the American Southwest.
- Athapaskan-speaking people begin migrating from the prairies of Alberta and Montana toward the American Southwest.
- The Four Corners area of the American Southwest suffered severe droughts late in the century, causing many Pueblos to abandon their cliff dwellings for irrigable settlements along the Rio Grande in southern New Mexico.
- 1300: Cliff Palace is abandoned.
- 1200–1400: Middle Mississippian culture in the Eastern Woodlands
- 1315–1317: The Little Ice Age brought a period of severe decline to medieval Europe, causing the Great Famine.
- The 14th century in America probably also brought decline of the Mississippian culture, especially in the northern states. Dendroclimatology suggests that severe droughts ravaged the American Southwest and especially the Southern Plains early in the period, leading to a rapid cultural decline.
- Athapaskan-speaking people continue to migrate southward from the Canadian prairies toward the American Southwest.
- c.1400-1500 Athapaskan-speaking Apache and Navajo reach the American Southwest after migrating over three centuries from the western Canadian prairies.
- Mississippian culture (Pensacola culture, Plaquemine culture, Lake George Phase, Fort Walton culture)
- Late Woodland Southeast (Alachua culture, Suwannee Valley culture)
- Safety Harbor culture
- 1492: Christopher Columbus sails in search of a new route to India and lands in the Caribbean, leading to the first European contact in the Americas since the Norse colonization of North America 500 years earlier.
- 1497: Italian navigator John Cabot sails from England to Newfoundland.

== See also ==
- Woodland period
- List of archaeological periods (North America)
- Timeline of archaic North America
