= Plains Village period =

Archaeological period of the American Great Plains

The Plains Village period or the Plains Village tradition is an archaeological period on the Great Plains from North Dakota down to Texas, spanning approximately 900/950 to 1780/1850 CE.

On the west and east, Plains villagers were bounded by the geography and landscapes of the Rocky Mountains and the Eastern Woodlands, respectively. Prior to the introduction of the horse and contact with Europeans and Africans, Plains Indians were mostly semi-sedentary; they typically farmed in villages and hunted bison from temporary camps. They used dogs to help transport their temporary lodges and game from the hunts. Depending upon the region, their more permanent architecture included grass houses; stone-lined, semi-subterranean pit-houses; and earth lodges. Bison scapula hoes were used as important tools in farming crops such as maize, beans, and squash. The women made varied ceramic pots for cooking and storage.

The people of the earlier parts of this archaeological period spoke Siouan and Caddoan languages. They included the Siouan-speaking Mandan and Hidatsa, and the Caddoan-speaking Arikara, Pawnee, and Wichita peoples. During the latter part of this time period, many more tribes from diverse language groups migrated into the Plains from both the east and the west.

Chronology of the early Great Plains includes these periods:

- Paleoindian (ca. 9500–5500 BCE or 10,000–4000 BCE
- Plains Archaic period (ca. 5500–500 BCE or 4000–250 BCE)
- Plains Woodland period (ca. 500 BCE–1000 CE or 250 BCE–950 CE)
- Plains Village period (ca. 1000–1780 CE. or 950–1850 CE)

Geographically, the Plains Village period is divided into:

- Northern Plains Village tradition
- Central Plains Village tradition.

The Southern Plains to Nebraska are included in the Central Plains Village period. Dates for the Central Plains Village culture in Nebraska are given as 900 to 1450 CE. This period marked a time with the greatest population in Nebraska. Most archeological sites date from 1000 to 1400 CE.

The Dakotas are part of the Northern Plains Village tradition. A Northeastern Plains Village tradition has been found for the shores of Devils Lake and the lands near the James, Sheyenne, Maple, and Red Rivers in eastern North Dakota.

== Chronology ==
Archaeologists debate specific dates, but this period has been subdivided into the following general chronology:

- Early Plains Village period: 1000–1250 CE
- Middle Plains Village period: 1250–1450 CE
- Late Plains Village period: 1450–1750 CE.

For post-archaic periods, the Kansas Historical Society uses the chronology of

- Early Ceramic period (1–1000 CE),
- Middle Ceramic period (1000–1500 CE), and
- Late Ceramic period (1500–1800 CE).

== Phases and complexes ==
These periods are further divided into geographically specific phases.

Plains Village cultures in southern Colorado and Kansas, northern New Mexico, northwestern Texas, and western Oklahoma are called the Southern Plains villagers. This group includes the Redbud Plains variant of the Paoli phase (800–1250), and Washita River phase. Custer phase, and Turkey Creek phase of western Oklahoma.

The Henrietta and Wylie Creek focuses are located in north-central Texas.

- The Upper Canark variant in the Texas and Oklahoma panhandles includes the Antelope Creek phase, and the Buried City and Zimms complexes.
- The Apishapa phase is in southeastern Colorado.
- The Bluff Creek, Wilmore, and Pratt complexes are in south central Kansas. A group of protohistoric Wichita people villages in central Kansas are called the Great Bend aspect.

The Wheeler phase dates from 1450 to 1700 CE, which comprised the Edwards complex of southwest Oklahoma (1500–1650) and the Wheeler complex (1650–1725). Wheeler phase archaeological sites include the Edwards I site (34BK2), Taylor site (34GR8), Little Deer site (34CU10), Duncan site (34WA2), and Goodwin-Baker site (34RM14), Parade Ground site (34CM322) all in western Oklahoma, and additional sites in northern Texas.

The Garza Complex of the Texas Panhandle-Plains likely spans 1450 to 1700 as well.

Thousands of Central Plains Village tradition sites have been discovered in Nebraska. One of the most significant is the Patterson site, a village in Sarpy County dating from 1000 to 1400 CE.

== See also ==
- Crow Creek Massacre, 1325 CE
- Medicine Creek (Republican River tributary)
- Southern Plains villagers, 800–1500 CE
