= Arzberger site =

- Arzberger Site
- U.S. National Register of Historic Places
- U.S. National Historic Landmark
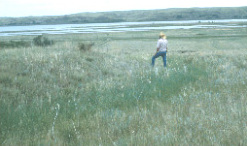
- Countryside at the site
- Nearest city: Pierre, South Dakota
- NRHP reference No.: 66000715

Significant dates
- Added to NRHP: October 15, 1966
- Designated NHL: July 19, 1964

The Arzberger Site, designated by archaeologists with the Smithsonian trinomial 39HU6, is a major archaeological site in Hughes County, near Pierre, South Dakota. It was declared a National Historic Landmark in 1964. It is a large fortified village, that is the type site for the Initial Coalescent, a culture that flourished in the area c. 1200-1350 CE.

== Site description ==
The Arzberger Site is located on a terrace overlooking the east bank of the Missouri River, about 8 miles (13 km) southeast of Pierre. The site is that of a fortified village, which originally had a wooden stockade encircling an area of about 44 acres (18 ha). The stockade was fortified with 24 bastions, and there were 44 house structures inside it.

Although the site is considered the type site for the Initial Coalescent, it appears temporally late in the sequence of sites now associated with that cultural phase, and may be one of its final outposts. Its people appear to have disappeared from the region not long afterward, supplanted by the Middle Missouri culture. It is not far from the Crow Creek Site, the scene of a major massacre in the 1300s.

The site was first excavated in 1939 by William Duncan Strong and Albert Spaulding, at which time portions of the fortification ditch, one bastion, and four houses were excavated. Of the houses excavated, two were typical circular earth lodge, while one was more rectangular in shape, a style more typically found in North Dakota. The houses included fire pits and cache pits, the latter found both inside and outside the structures. Pottery finds, according to Strong, were of a style that appears ancestral to both the Arikara to the north and the Pawnee to the south.

== See also ==
- List of National Historic Landmarks in South Dakota
- National Register of Historic Places listings in Hughes County, South Dakota
