= Medicine Creek Archeological District =

- U.S. National Register of Historic Places
- Nearest city: Lower Brule, South Dakota
- Area: 1,271 acres (5.14 km^{2})
- MPS: Big Bend Area MRA
- NRHP reference No.: 86002740
- Added to NRHP: August 14, 1986

The Medicine Creek Archeological District, near Lower Brule, South Dakota, is an archeological district which was listed on the National Register of Historic Places in 1986. It includes 1,271 acres (5.14 km^{2}) of land in Hughes and Lyman counties.

The listing included 21 contributing sites, including a village site. It was listed for its potential to yield information in the future.

Medicine Creek is a tributary, coming in from the west, of the Missouri River.

The district includes one or more sites dating from the Plains Woodland period (1-900 A.D.). It includes a village camp, White Horse (39HU88) which has unfortunately been severely eroded.

It was listed as part of a study of the multiple prehistoric and historic archeological resources in South Dakota's Big Bend Area.
