= Langdeau Site =

- U.S. National Register of Historic Places
- U.S. National Historic Landmark
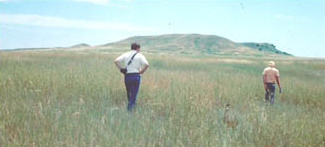
- Fields at the Langdeau Site
- Location: Address restricted
- Nearest city: Lower Brule, South Dakota
- Area: 60,700 square metres (6.07 ha)
- NRHP reference No.: 66000717

Significant dates
- Added to NRHP: October 15, 1966
- Designated NHL: July 19, 1964

The Langdeau Site, designated by the Smithsonian trinomial 39LM209, is an archaeological site in Lyman County, South Dakota, near Lower Brule. It was declared a National Historic Landmark in 1964. The site was one of the first to provide evidence of horticultural activity by Native Americans in the region.

== Description ==
The exact location/address of this historic site is restricted. It is located on a high terrace overlooking the Missouri River. It consists of fifteen depressions consistent with traditional Native American earthlodge construction, with no evidence that the village was fortified (e.g. by being surrounded by a palisade). Pottery finds at the site were instrumental in establishing a prehistoric settlement chronology in the Big Bend area of central South Dakota between 1100 and 1300 CE.

The site underwent excavation in 1962 under the auspices of the Smithsonian Institution's River Basin Survey, a program that investigated river banks archaeologically in advance of planned flood control and water supply projects. The expedition excavated four of the house sites, which were depressions between 30 and 40 feet (9.1 and 12.2 m) in width. The ends appeared to be open, lacking posts, and were stained with red ocher. They also dug trenches in an unsuccessful bid to locate evidence of fortification. This differentiated the site from the nearby Jiggs Thompson Site, which the same crew found to be surrounded by a moat. Finds at this site included copper, shell, bone, and stone tools and ornaments.

== See also ==
- List of National Historic Landmarks in South Dakota
- National Register of Historic Places listings in Lyman County, South Dakota
