= Edgar Vernon House =

Historic house in South Dakota, United States

- U.S. National Register of Historic Places
- Location: Off U.S. Route 16, Presho, South Dakota
- Coordinates: 43°54′29″N 100°03′02″W
- Area: 1 acre (0.40 ha)
- Built: 1908
- Built by: Emery Fry
- Architectural style: Late Victorian
- NRHP reference No.: 78002562
- Added to NRHP: March 30, 1978

The Edgar Vernon House, located off U.S. Route 16 in Presho, South Dakota, was listed on the National Register of Historic Places in 1978.

It was built in 1908 and is a one-and-a-half-story house with some elements of Victorian architectural style; it was the grandest house in the area. It was built for the Edgar Vernon family who came from Delaware to Lyman County, South Dakota in 1907. It was built by carpenters Emery Fry, David Holmes, and Bill Nelson.

The house served as a flu hospital during World War I.
