= Larson Site =

Archaeological site in Illinois, United States

- U.S. National Register of Historic Places
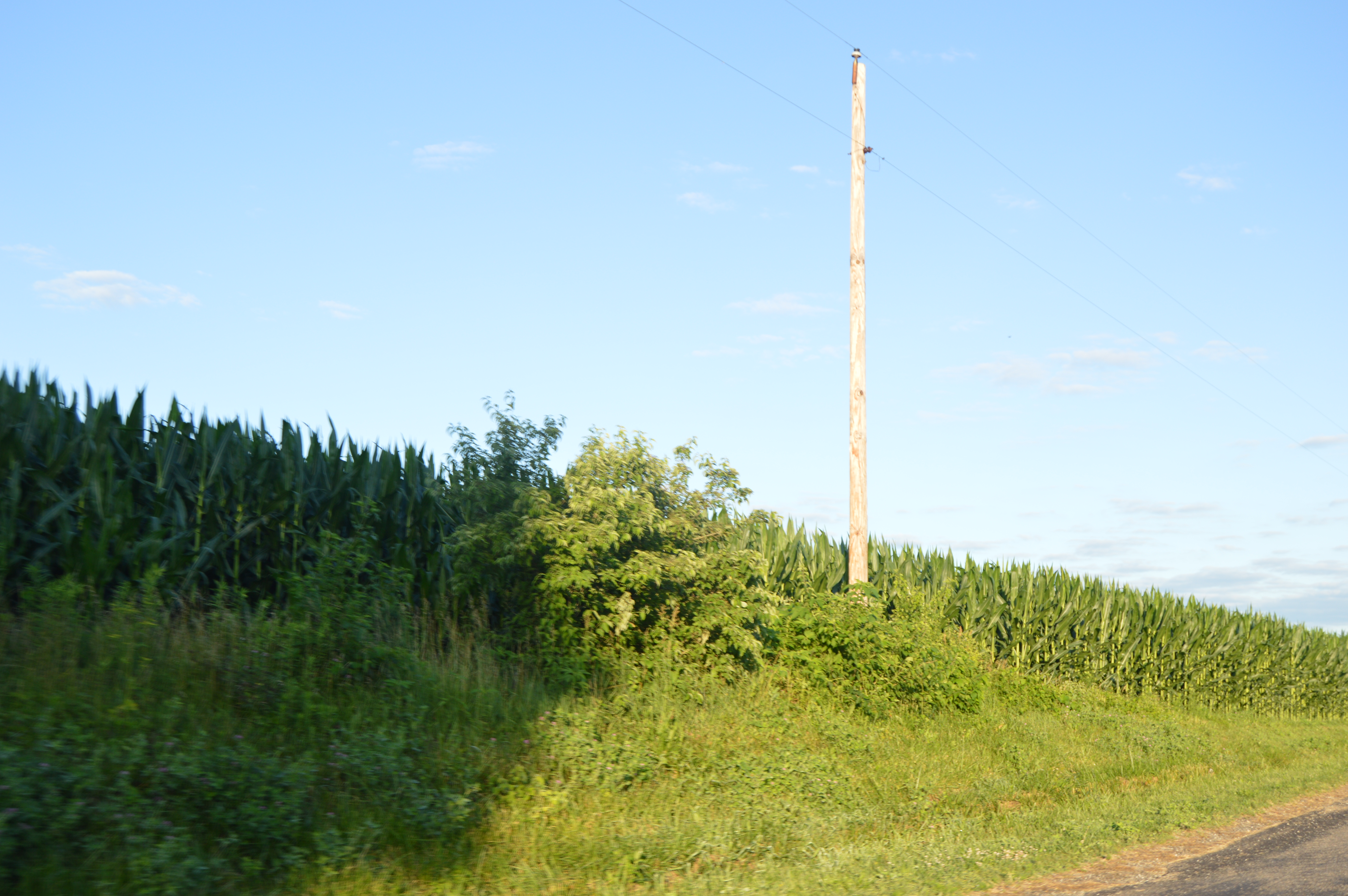
- Nearest city: Lewistown, Illinois
- Area: 70 acres (28 ha)
- NRHP reference No.: 78001145
- Added to NRHP: November 21, 1978

The Larson Site is a prehistoric archaeological site in Fulton County, Illinois, near the city of Lewistown. The site was the location of a Mississippian town and was occupied during the 13th and 14th centuries. The town was one of seven major town sites in the central Illinois River valley and served as a social and economic center for surrounding villages and farms. The artifacts uncovered at the site have been well-preserved and include both organic remains and intact homes, providing significant archaeological evidence regarding the Mississippian way of life.

== Early history ==
The Larson Site was a stockaded village with a large flat-topped mound in an open plaza surrounded by homes. The Larson site was located at the confluence of the Spoon River and Illinois River.

Spoon River Mississippian consists of three phases:

- Eveland (A.D. 1050–1150)
- Orendorf (A.D. 1150–1250)
- Larson (A.D. 1250–1300)

== Archaeology ==
In 1964 through 1970, archaeologist Alan Harn excavated the Larson Site. The village had been attacked and burned circa 1240.

The site was added to the National Register of Historic Places on November 21, 1978.
