= Plains Woodland period =

Archaeological period in North America

The Plains Woodland period or Plains Woodland tradition refers to an archaeological period and group of cultures that existed across the Great Plains of North America approximately 2500–200 Before Present (BP). It was preceded by the Plains Archaic period and succeeded by the Plains Village period. The cultures in this period were heavily influenced by their contemporary neighbors in the Eastern Woodlands, particularly the mound-building Hopewell culture. It was the first tradition pattern on the Great Plains to widely engage in mound building and is also characterized by limited gardening and the production of ceramic cookware.

== Distribution ==
The Plains Woodland traditions were widely distributed across central North America, generally following the Great Plains, although its influence stretched beyond this region in certain areas. Broadly, its reach stretched westward to the foothills of the Rocky Mountains; eastward to the Great Plains's boundary with the Eastern Woodlands; southward up to the Red River of the South; and northward up to the boreal forest of Canada. The earliest sites are concentrated in the east, suggesting a later westward expansion.

== Chronology ==
The Outline of Archaeological Traditions (OAT) provides an absolute date range of 2500–200 BP.

The Plains Woodland period persisted much longer in some areas than others, often coexisting with Plains Village traditions in the same region. In the northeastern United States in particular, Plains Woodland cultures existed well after contact with Europeans. As such, dates given are a subject of discussion and dispute among anthropologists and are therefore estimates.

- Early Plains Woodland
- Middle Plains Woodland
- Late Plains Woodland

== Development ==
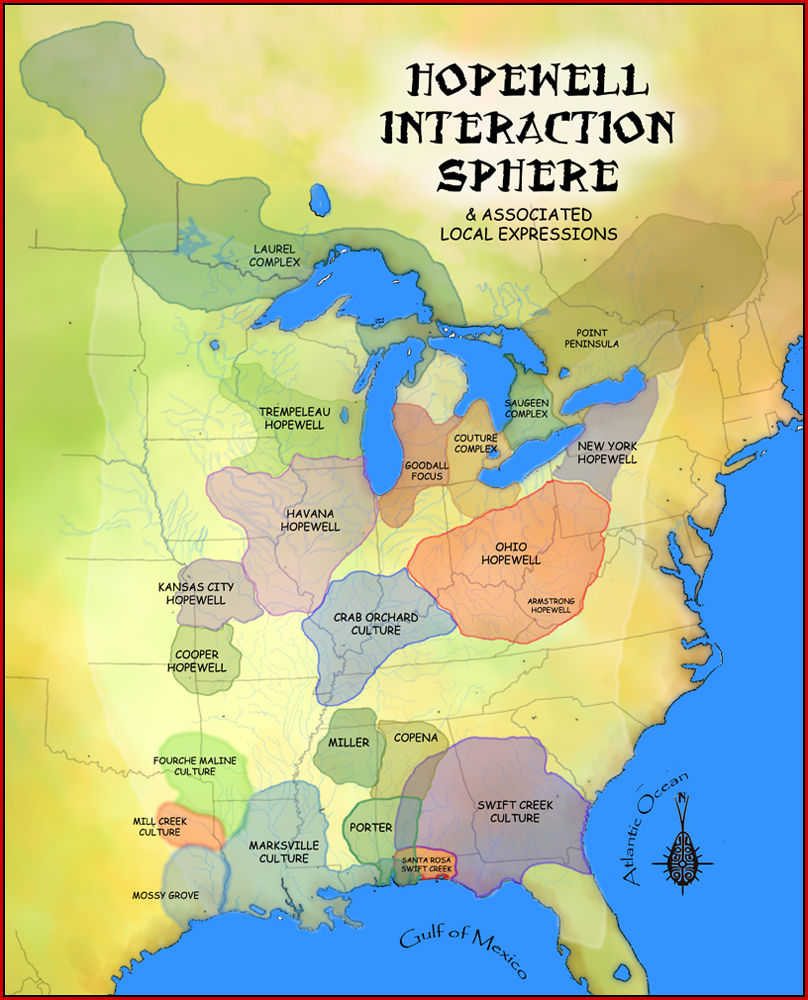
The Hopewell culture had a significant influence on the development of the Plains Woodland tradition to the west.

Development of the Plains Woodland peoples has been heavily tied to interactions with the Hopewell culture, which existed to the east. Around 2000–1700 BP, cultural exchange and trade between the Hopewellians and the peoples of the Great Plains was at its strongest. During this period, burial mounds were more common than previously. Many of the ceramic vessels and stone tools recovered from Plains Woodlands sites resemble those at Hopewellian sites. Shells from the Atlantic and Gulf of Mexico have been recovered from inland Plains Woodland sites.

== Characteristics ==
The Plains Woodland tradition provides the first evidence for widespread mound building on the Great Plains. Additionally, these peoples engaged in ceramic firing of vessels used for cooking and some gardening.

=== Society and organization ===
Plains Woodlands peoples typically congregated in small villages; most residential centers were settled on open plains areas near a stream or river, but other occupation sites exist, such as caves and rock shelters. Most of the villages consisted of only a few buildings and housed one or two extended family groups. The average size of a residential building was about 6 metres (20 ft) and were usually supported by wooden poles covered by hides, bark, thatching, or wattle and daub. Some larger longhouse structures have been found in Kansas, and in the western stretches of the culture (particularly in Colorado), masonry construction took place. Villages in the west, where subsistence on bison played a larger role in local lifeways, tended to be more ephemeral or seasonal as the residents moved with the bison herds; villages in the eastern stretches tended to be more permanent. By the Late Plains Woodland period and during periods when food was plentiful or agriculture was thriving, larger settlements became more common.

Plains Woodlands-associated rock art sites, quarries, bison kill sites, cemeteries, and workshops have also been found. Additionally, the Plains Woodland peoples established several rendezvous sites, where various bands from across the region would congregate and engage in trade, culture, and ritual.

==== Burial practices ====
Various burial practices were observed during this period. Many burials occurred ossuaries or burial mounds, or other underground sites, while in other regions, there is evidence of sky burials. At least one crematory has been found at the Richland site in northeastern Kansas.

==== Cultural practices and religion ====
Ethnographic evidence suggests the Plains Woodlands peoples were animist. Bison are depicted frequently in rock art sites, and their bones appear commonly at ritual sites.

Peoples in this period often created rock art, petroglyphs, and petroforms, as well as decorative textiles. Various materials were used in decoration, including feathers, quills, and deer hooves. Ceramic figurines resemble those found in Hopewellian sites.

=== Diet ===
In eastern villages, agriculture was more common than in the west, where bison herds and hunter-gatherer lifeways dominated. Native fauna hunted for resources also included cervids; mid-sized animals like raccoons, beavers, and dogs; and smaller game like rabbits and squirrels, and rarely reptiles or amphibians; and seafood such as fish and shellfish. Herd sizes for migrating game were larger in the north, where the grasslands were more plentiful than in the more arid southern regions.

The most common plants cultivated or gathered for consumption included maize, squash, sunflowers, and marsh elders.

Food was commonly stored in ceramic vessels and often smoked, dried, boiled, or prepared for long-term storage.

=== Pottery ===
The main material association for the Plains Woodland period is its ceramics. These vessels are typically cord-roughened or impressed, and then tempered with a rough material like grit, sand, grog, or bone.

Some evidence of woven baskets has also been found.

=== Lithics ===
Several typologies of points exist within the period. The major lithic type of the later periods is a bifaced arrowhead point. Other stone tool assemblages, including knives, hammers, scrapers, and axes, are common in open-air sites.

== Subtraditions ==
The Plains Woodland tradition has been broken down into several regional variants. Different subtraditions and cultures existed at different times under each division.

=== Northern Plains Woodland ===
The Northern Plains Woodland subtradition was located as far south as the Niobrara River, northwards to the Aspen parkland of central Canada, west to the foothills of the Rocky Mountains, and eastward to the ecotone of the Great Plains and Missourian woodlands. It occurred from about 2500 BP in the southeasternmost regions up to the European contact period (about 150 BP) in the northernmost areas, and includes the Early (2500–2100 BP), Middle (2100–1500 BP), and Late (1500–150 BP) periods. Several Plains Woodland tribes persisted up to and after the contact period, including the Dakota, at which point various effects of colonization ended the period.

=== Central Plains Woodland ===
The Central Plains Woodland emerged on the central Great Plains about 2500 BP and persisted until about 1000 BP. It is further broken up into Early (2500–2000 BP), Middle (2000–1500), and Late (1500–1000) periods.

This culture spanned modern-day Wyoming, Kansas, Nebraska, Iowa, and Colorado. This culture existed at a time when the climate had cooled significantly but had warmed by 1300 BP. Most settlements have been found along creeks or rivers, often on alluvial floodplains, but sometimes in rock shelters or on high ridges. Many encampments might have been semipermanent or seasonal and only populated while residents were gathering resources.

Over 800 Central Middle Woodland period burials have been found. Based on age estimates of recovered burials, the life expectancy during this period was longer and infant mortality was lower than in the Plains Village period following it.

=== Southern Plains Woodland ===
The Southern Plains Woodland is largely relegated to the arid grasslands between the Arkansas and Red Rivers, diffusing westward into the Llano Estacado region, and lasted between 2000 BP to 1000 BP. The development of this variety from the earlier Plains Archaic period was gradual. Very little movement occurred, and cultural development took place in situ rather than as the result of migration bringing cultural exchange.

== Notable sites ==
- Schultz site

== See also ==
- Archaeology of the Americas
- Plains Indians
- Southern Plains villagers
