= Crow Creek massacre =

- Crow Creek Site
- U.S. National Register of Historic Places
- U.S. National Historic Landmark
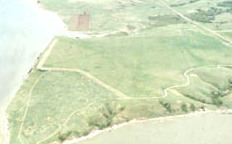
- Aerial view of the site

- Location within South Dakota Location within the United States
- Nearest city: Chamberlain, South Dakota
- Coordinates: 43°58′48″N 99°19′54″W
- Built: c. 1100 AD
- NRHP reference No.: 66000710

Significant dates
- Added to NRHP: October 15, 1966
- Designated NHL: July 19, 1964

The Crow Creek massacre occurred around the mid-14th century AD and involved Native American groups at a site along the upper Missouri River in the South Dakota area that is now within the Crow Creek Indian Reservation.

Crow Creek Site, the site of the massacre near Chamberlain, is an archaeological site and a U.S. National Historic Landmark, located at coordinates 43°58′48″N 99°19′54″W. An excavation of part of the site was done in the 1950s, at the time of dam construction on the river. Additional excavations were conducted in 1978 and later.

Two groups occupied the site in prehistoric times.

- The Siouan-speaking Middle Missouri people (Initial Middle Missouri variant), ancestral to the present-day Mandan people, first occupied the site sometime after about 900 AD. They built numerous earth lodges on the lower portion of the site.
- Caddoan-speaking Central Plains people (Initial Coalescent variant) moved into the area from southern areas (present-day Nebraska) sometime around 1150 AD. (The present-day Arikara are a Caddoan people.) Whether they displaced the earlier group or moved on to an abandoned site is unknown. The Central Plains (Initial Coalescent) people built at least 55 lodges, mostly on the upper part of the site.

There is no direct evidence that there was conflict between the two groups, and scholars have found evidence that both cultures changed gradually in relation to the other.

There is evidence that the Central Plains/Initial Coalescent villagers built well-planned defensive works for their village. They were replacing an earlier dry moat fortification with a new fortification ditch around the expanded village when an attack occurred that resulted in the massacre. The attacking group killed all the villagers.

Archaeologists from the University of South Dakota, directed by project director Larry J. Zimmerman, field director Thomas Emerson, and osteologist P. Wille, found the remains of at least 486 people killed during the attack. Most of these remains showed signs of ritual mutilation, particularly scalping. Other examples were tongues being removed, teeth broken, beheading, hands and feet being cut off, and other forms of dismemberment. In addition to the severity of the attack, most of the people showed signs of malnutrition and many had evidence of earlier wounds, likely from other attacks. This evidence has suggested to scholars that lives of people of the Initial Coalescent culture were under more stress than was thought; they have theorized that the people were attacked by another group or several groups of the Initial Coalescent culture in the area in competition for arable land and resources.

== Site ==
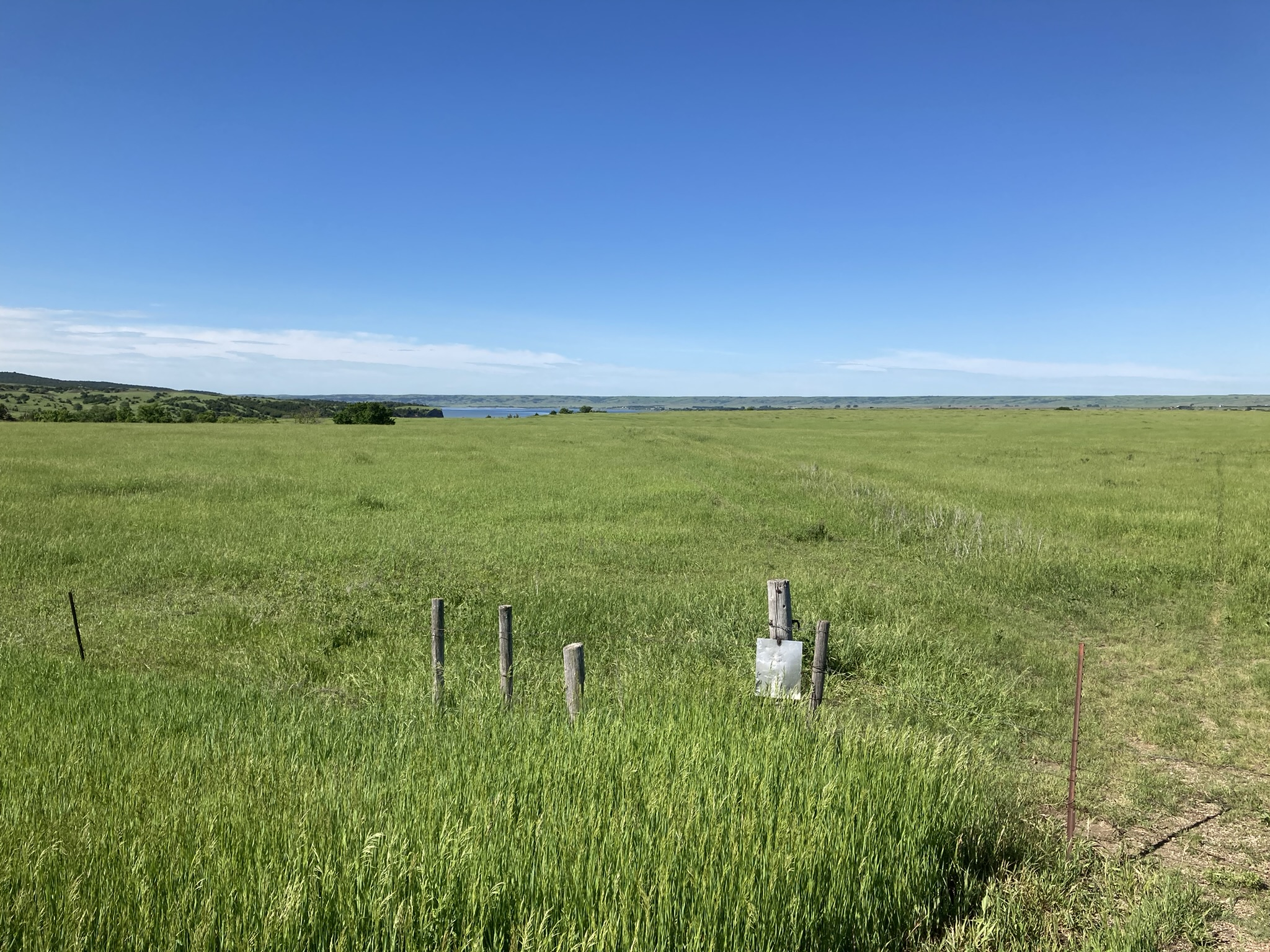
Looking southwest toward the Crow Creek Site

The Crow Creek site, designated 39BF11 under the Smithsonian site numbering system, is located along the Missouri River in central South Dakota. The site is located on lands now under the control of the US Army Corps of Engineers due to its flood control and other projects on the river. It is surrounded by the territory of the Crow Creek Indian Reservation. The descendants of the people of the Middle Missouri and Central Plains/Initial Coalescent cultures now live in North Dakota as the Mandan and Arikara nations, respectively, of the Three Affiliated Tribes (together with the Hidatsa). Some occupy Fort Berthold Indian Reservation, but many also live off the reservation in cities.

Crow Creek is now a well-preserved archaeological site. It was listed as National Historic Landmark (number 66000710) when the Register was started in 1964.

In 1978, South Dakota State Archaeologist, Robert Alex, and other members of his office attended a meeting hosted by the South Dakota Archaeological Society. They toured the Crow Creek site, which had been known and had some professional excavation in the 1950s as part of surveys and salvage excavations preceding construction of Big Bend Dam on the Missouri within the reservation boundaries. They discovered human bones eroding from the end of the fortification ditch.

After they received permission to excavate the site from the reservation tribal council, following consultation about how to proceed and agreement to rebury remains on site, archeology teams recovered the skeletal remains of at least 486 Crow Creek villagers. These estimates were based on the number of right temporal bones present at the scene. The characteristics of the remains at the site show they were killed in an overwhelming attack, which has been called the Crow Creek Massacre. Discovery of this event has raised many questions in the archaeological community, particularly who attacked the village and why.

== Skeletal remains ==
The remains of the villagers of Crow Creek were discovered in a fortification ditch, where they were buried during the mid-14th century and covered with a small layer of clay from the river bottom. The bodies found in the fortification ditch were piled as deep as four feet in some areas. The bodies showed evidence of having lain out exposed to weather and scavengers for a period of time, becoming at least partly disarticulated before burial. A systematic or formal burial of individual bodies might have been impossible due to the state of the remains by the time of later burial.

It is not clear who buried the victims of the massacre, whether it was the attackers, escaped villagers, or members of an affiliated village. The layer of clay covering the bodies was coated by a "thin and scattered layer of bones," of which the purpose is unknown. Researchers thought that scavengers might have dug up these remains as a food source. The remains of these villagers reveal their untimely deaths and events of the last attack. They also reveal other hardships of their lives: evidence of nutritional deficiencies and previous warfare, which suggest adaptations to the changes were more difficult. These were documented by paleopathologist John B. Gregg.

=== Nutritional deficiencies ===
The villagers' skeletal remains, as well as the fact that remains of canines (dogs) were buried with the villagers, provide evidence of extensive nutritional deficiencies of a chronic nature. According to Zimmerman's 1985 book, Peoples of Prehistoric South Dakota, the bones reveal several ailments related to chronic malnutrition. As stated in Zimmerman's book, "one of the most common characteristics was a pitting in the top of the eye sockets called cribra orbitalis. Associated with this on several skulls was porotic hyperostosis, a pitting on the back of the skull". Both of these conditions are caused by a deficiency of iron in the diet. In addition to these ailments, Harris lines (an indicator of insufficient amounts of protein and other essential minerals, as well as truncated episodes of growth) were discovered while specialists examined radiographs of several individuals. The Crow Creek villagers were measured as being shorter than their Arikara descendants, with the females being significantly shorter; this could have been another effect of nutritional deficiencies and illness.

In a journal article entitled "The Crow Creek Massacre: Initial Coalescent Warfare and Speculations about the Genesis of Extended Coalescent", Zimmerman and Bradley propose that the severe conditions faced by the Crow Creek villagers were not short term. Based on the evidence of "active and organizing subperiostial hematomas along with the other bony alterations" found while examining remains, they concluded that the villagers had long suffered malnutrition, in repeated episodes thought due to the unstable climate and drought, which reduced the crop yields and food supplies.

The presence of animal bones within the fortification ditch suggests that villagers ate their dogs because of hunger. Willey and Emerson's article entitled "The Osteology and Archaeology of the Crow Creek Massacre" describes the presence of animal bones, specifically canine, within the fortification ditch. They said that it is likely the canines were eaten by the villagers, and their remains were accidentally included in the burial when other parties collected the villagers' remains. It appears that even domesticated animals such as dogs were used as food sources during this time of famine.

=== Evidence of previous warfare ===
The skeletal remains of the villagers also showed evidence of earlier wounds. According to the 1982 dissertation entitled Osteology of the Crow Creek Massacre by P. Willey, evidence of previous warfare is present in the skeletal remains of victims found in the mass burial. Two individuals had survived previous scalping incidents, and were in the process of healing, which was indicated by the bony re-growth of their skulls; a third individual had survived a head injury as indicated by "a healed depressed fracture in the frontal". Others showed evidence of being wounded by arrows, the points of which remained in the legs and were overgrown by bone.

=== The massacre ===
Many of the bodies are missing limbs; the attackers may have taken them as trophies, scavenger animals or birds may have carried them away, or some limbs may have been left unburied in the Crow Creek village. Authors Willey and Emerson state that "they had been killed, mutilated, and scavenged before being buried". "Tongue removal, decapitation, and dismemberment of the Crow Creek victims may have been based on standard aboriginal butchering practices developed on large game animals". These are among the mutilations discovered at the Crow Creek site. In addition, scalping was performed, bodies were burned, and there is evidence of limbs being removed by various means. As stated in Willey's dissertation, many of the mutilations suffered by the victims of the Crow Creek massacre could have been traumatic enough to result in death.

A conservative estimate of villagers who suffered scalping is 90%, but it could have been as high as 100%. This is based on skeletal remains that exhibit cuts on their skulls indicative of scalping. Men, women, and children were scalped; the only difference was that younger children were cut higher on the skull than other groups.

== Hypotheses ==
The events leading to this massacre are unknown, but there are many hypotheses. The most plausible is that this was internecine warfare, and that "overpopulation, land-use patterns, and an unstable climate caused the people to compete for available farmland" and other resources. The malnutrition suffered by the Crow Creek villagers was most likely common for people in that region during this time period. Because of this, there is a strong chance that another Initial Coalescent group or several groups in the region attacked the Crow Creek village for its arable land and resources.

== Reburial and further study ==
Before the excavations could proceed, the Corps of Engineers and the University of South Dakota Archaeology Laboratory team consulted with the Crow Creek Sioux Reservation Tribal Council, as well as representatives of the Mandan and Arikara peoples, who now are based mostly on Fort Berthold Indian Reservation in North Dakota. The researchers agreed to the tribal council request that the remains stay within South Dakota for the entire period of study and that, after study, the remains should be reburied on the Crow Creek site, the place where the families had lived and died.

Particularly because of the scale of the reburial, the case attracted international attention. While Native American tribes had been requesting return of remains and artifacts held by museums and historic societies, this would be the largest reburial of remains. Some archeologists and human osteologists criticized the agreement at the time, "contending that new techniques would have allowed substantially more information to be gleaned from the remains if they had been curated for eventual restudy."

At the request of the Arikara, the remains were placed in five burial vaults. In order to avoid disturbing the site, the vaults were buried in areas where earlier archeological excavations had taken place in the 1950s. The study took three years, and the reburial took place in late summer 1981. Several Christian ceremonies, a traditional Lakota ceremony, and a private Arikara ceremony were offered at the time.

The reburial was controversial and one of the largest ever to have occurred in the United States. Some researchers thought the remains should have been preserved for more study. However, so much skeletal evidence was gathered that many studies were still made through the mid-1990s, based on measurements, photographs, and radiographs of the remains taken during those three years. New (21st century) analyses of the dates on the massacre and the occupational history of the site are also being made, which may change some interpretations.

== Legacy ==
Since the reburial, the US Congress and South Dakota legislature have passed laws governing consultation with tribes, and return of remains and artifacts of cultural importance. The most far-reaching federal legislation was the 1990 Native American Graves Protection and Repatriation Act (NAGPRA) (Public Law 101–601).

== See also ==
- List of Indian massacres in North America
- List of National Historic Landmarks in South Dakota

== Sources ==
- Bamforth, Douglas and Curtis Nepstad-Thornberry, 2007. "Reconsidering the Occupational History of the Crow Creek Site (39BF11)", Plains Anthropologist 52(202:153-173.
- Gregg, John B. and Pauline Gregg, 1987. Dry Bones: Dakota Territory Reflected. University of South Dakota Press: Vermillion.
- Pauketat, Timothy R. (2005). North American Archaeology, Blackwell Publishing
- Willey, P. (1981) "Another view by one of the Crow Creek researchers", Early Man, 3 (26)
- Willey, P. (1982) Osteology of the Crow Creek Massacre, Unpublished Ph.D. dissertation, Department of Anthropology, University of Tennessee, Knoxville.
- Willey, P. and Emerson, Thomas E., (1993) "The Osteology and Archaeology of the Crow Creek Massacre", Plains Anthropologist 38(145):227-269
- Willey, P., Galloway, Alison, and Snyder, Lynn, (1997) "Bone Mineral Density and Survival of Elements and Element Portions in the Bones of the Crow Creek Massacre Victims", American Journal of Physical Anthropology 104:513-528
- Zimmerman, Larry J., 1985 Peoples of Prehistoric South Dakota, University of Nebraska Press, Lincoln and London.
- Zimmerman, Larry J. and Robert Alex. (1981) "How the Crow Creek Archaeologists View the Question of Reburial", Early Man 3(3):25-26.
- Zimmerman, Larry J. and Bradley, Lawrence E., 1993 "The Crow Creek Massacre: Initial Coalescent Warfare and Speculations About the Genesis of Extended Coalescent", Plains Anthropologist 38(145):215-226, JSTOR
- Zimmerman, Larry J. and Richard Whitten, 1980. "Mass Grave at Crow Creek in South Dakota Reveals How Indians Massacred Indians in 14th Century Attack", Smithsonian 11(6):100-109.
