= Lower Brule, South Dakota =

Lower Brule Khulwíčhaša (Lakota)
- Census-designated place
- Location in Lyman County and the state of South Dakota
- Coordinates: 44°04′27″N 99°35′02″W
- Country: United States
- State: South Dakota
- County: Lyman

Government
  - Type: Tribal council
  - Chairman/CEO: Boyd Gourneau

Area
  - Total: 0.36 sq mi (0.94 km^{2})
  - Land: 0.36 sq mi (0.94 km^{2})
  - Water: 0 sq mi (0.00 km^{2})
- Elevation: 1,476 ft (450 m)

Population (2020)
  - Total: 703
  - Density: 1,934.4/sq mi (746.87/km^{2})
- Time zone: UTC-6 (Central (CST))
  - Summer (DST): UTC-5 (CDT)
- ZIP code: 57548
- Area code: 605
- FIPS code: 46-39180
- GNIS feature ID: 2393111

Lower Brule (Lakota: Khulwíčhaša) is a census-designated place (CDP) in Lyman County, South Dakota, United States. The population was 703 at the 2020 census. The community is located within the Lower Brule Indian Reservation, from which it takes its name.

== Geography ==
Lower Brule is located in northeastern Lyman County on the west side of Lake Sharpe, a reservoir on the Missouri River.

According to the United States Census Bureau, the CDP has a total area of 0.4 square miles (1.0 km^{2}), all land.

The reservation has a boat landing north of the city where walleyes and other fish can be caught. The local Indian tribe allows non-tribal members to hunt and fish within their reservation boundaries, and there is an abundance of upland game birds to hunt during the fall.

The Lower Brule Sioux tribe operates a popcorn packaging business, and the casino in the community is called the Golden Buffalo.

== Demographics ==
Historical population
Census	Pop.	Note	%±
2020	703		—
U.S. Decennial Census

As of the census of 2000, there were 599 people, 165 households, and 114 families residing in the CDP. The population density was 1,667.7 inhabitants per square mile (643.9/km^{2}). There were 182 housing units at an average density of 506.7 per square mile (195.6/km^{2}). The racial makeup of the CDP was 4.84% White, 0.17% African American, 94.82% Native American, and 0.17% from two or more races. Hispanic or Latino of any race were 0.33% of the population.

There were 165 households, out of which 46.7% had children under the age of 18 living with them, 21.2% were married couples living together, 34.5% had a female householder with no husband present, and 30.9% were non-families. 24.8% of all households were made up of individuals, and 6.1% had someone living alone who was 65 years of age or older. The average household size was 3.60 and the average family size was 4.30.

In the CDP, the population was spread out, with 44.2% under the age of 18, 9.8% from 18 to 24, 27.9% from 25 to 44, 13.9% from 45 to 64, and 4.2% who were 65 years of age or older. The median age was 23 years. For every 100 females, there were 95.1 males. For every 100 females age 18 and over, there were 96.5 males.

The median income for a household in the CDP was $18,750, and the median income for a family was $16,250. Males had a median income of $18,281 versus $19,107 for females. The per capita income for the CDP was $6,591. About 50.9% of families and 51.9% of the population were below the poverty line, including 56.2% of those under age 18 and 20.0% of those age 65 or over.
