= Arikara =

Ethnic group

Sáhniš
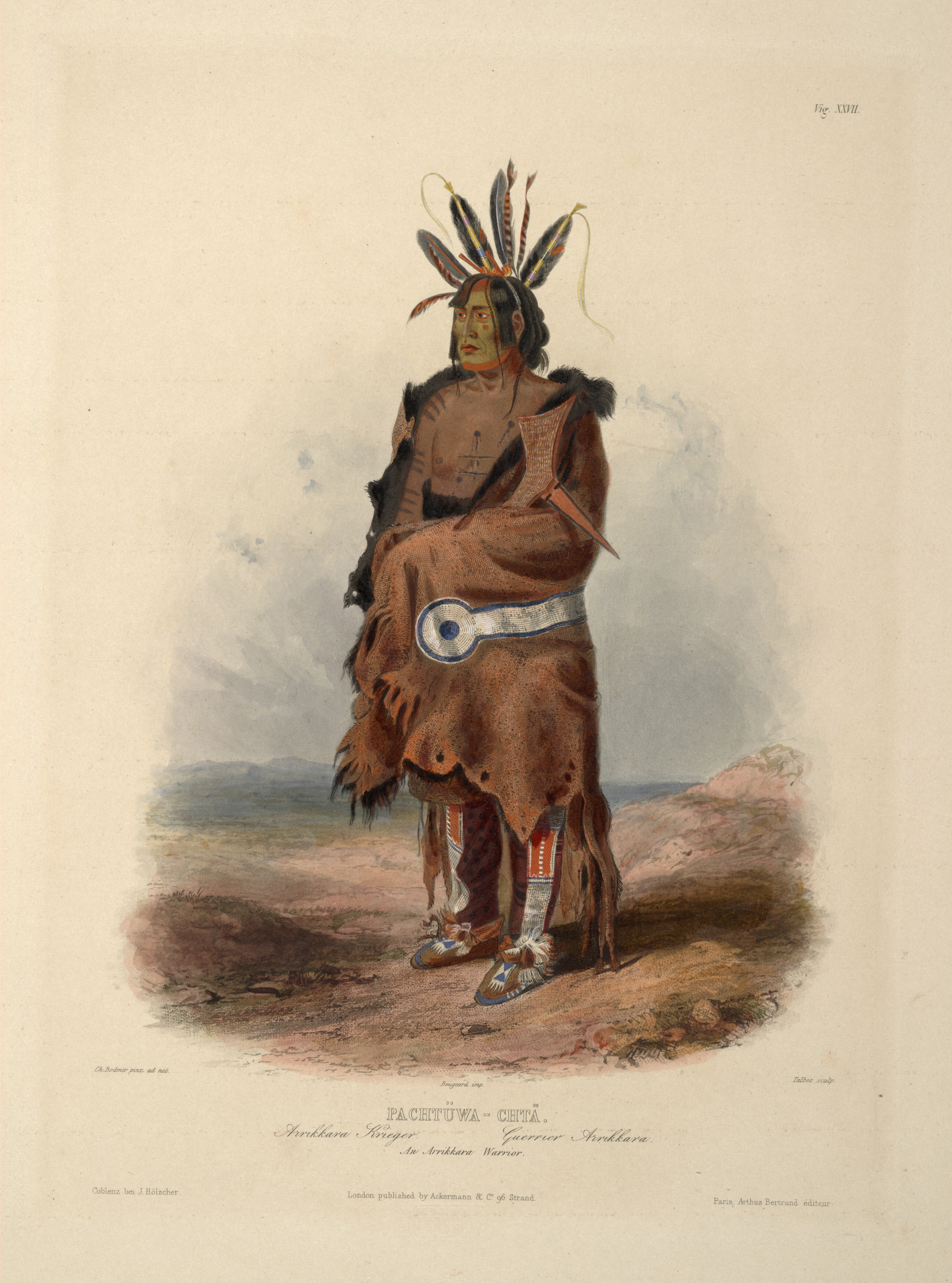
- An Arikara warrior holding a gunstock war club by Karl Bodmer (c. 1840–1843)

Total population
- 792 (2010 census)

Regions with significant populations
- North Dakota

Languages
- English, Arikara

Religion
- Christianity, Native American Church

Related ethnic groups
- Caddo, Kichai, Pawnee and Wichita

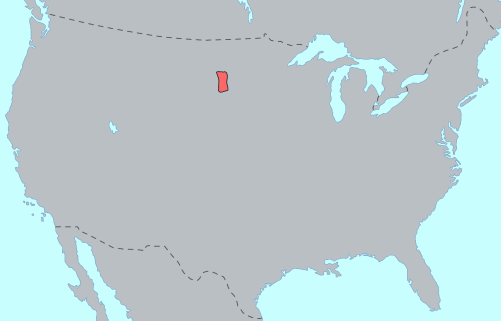
Pre-contact distribution of Arikara

The Arikara (/əˈrɪkərə/ ə-RICK-ə-rə, Arikara: Sáhniš), also known as Sahnish, Arikaree, Ree, or Hundi, are a tribe of Native Americans in North Dakota and South Dakota. Today, they are enrolled with the Mandan and the Hidatsa as the federally recognized tribe known as the Mandan, Hidatsa, and Arikara Nation.

== Name ==
The Arikara's name is believed to mean "horns", in reference to the ancient custom of wearing two upright bones in their hair. The name also could mean "elk people" or "corn eaters". The Arikara refer to themselves as Sáhniš.

== History ==
=== Early history ===
Linguistic divergence between Arikara and Pawnee suggests a separation from the Skidi Pawnee in about the 15th century. The Arzberger site near present-day Pierre, South Dakota, designated as a National Historic Landmark, is an archeological site from this period, containing the remains of a fortified village with more than 44 lodges.

An Arikara village, near where present-day Pierre, South Dakota developed, was visited in 1743 by two sons of the French trader and explorer La Vérendrye.

In the last quarter of the 17th century, the Arikara came under attack from the Omaha/Ponca and the Iowa near the end of the Omaha/Ponca migration to Nebraska. With peace established later, the Arikara influenced the newcomers. The Omaha still credit the Arikara women for instructing them in the art of building earth lodges.

=== 1700s to 1850 ===
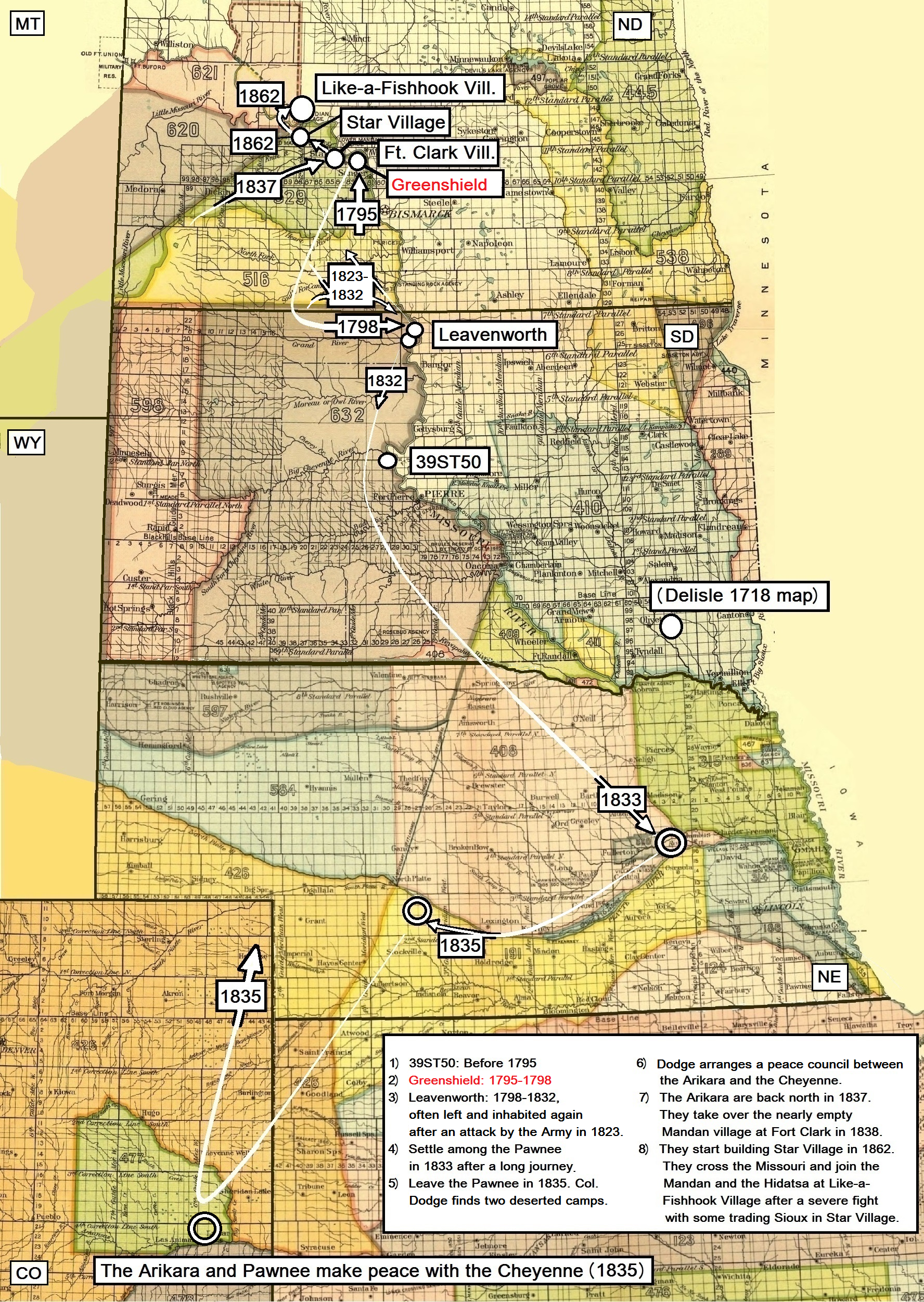
Map adapted to show the major movements (approximately) of the Arikara tribe from 1795 to 1862.

In the late 18th century, the tribe suffered a high rate of fatalities from smallpox epidemics, which reduced their population from an estimated 30,000 to 6,000, disrupting their social structure.

The smallpox epidemic of 1780-1782 reduced the Arikara villages along the Missouri from 32 to 2.

All-out war hit the weakened and often divided Arikara. In a burned-down village, (later studied as Larson Site), archaeologists found the mutilated skeletons of 71 men, women and children, killed in the early 1780s by unknown Native American attackers. Groups of Sioux were the ones who gained most by the weakening of the Arikara. They attacked the vulnerable Arikara and increased "the pace of Sioux expansion" west of the Missouri.

The Arikara faced many challenges during the first quarter of the 19th century: Reduced numbers, competition from white traders, and military pressure from the Lakota and other groups of Sioux. Alliances shifted constantly. The Arikara joined old foes the Sioux in raids on Mandan and Hidatsa Indians. Later they negotiated for peace with both village tribes.

Due to their reduced numbers, the Arikara started to live closer to the Mandan and Hidatsa in the same area for mutual protection. They migrated gradually from present-day Nebraska and South Dakota into North Dakota. The remainder of the group was encountered in 1804 by the Lewis and Clark Expedition.

The first Arikara delegation left for the capital, Washington, DC, in April 1805, urged by the Lewis and Clark Expedition. Chief Ankedoucharo became ill during his stay and died in Washington. The delegates blamed the whites for the chief's death. That was one reason why the Arikara for the next decades were "notoriously hostile to white Americans".

On June 2, 1823, the Arikara attacked a group of 70 trappers led by William Henry Ashley of the Henry/Ashley Company. The trappers were camped near an Arikara village at the mouth of Grand River (north of present-day Mobridge, South Dakota). Fourteen trappers died and 10 were wounded, including Hugh Glass, memorialized in the 1954 biographical novel Lord Grizzly by Frederick Manfred, the 2002 historical fiction novel The Revenant: A Novel of Revenge by Michael Punke, and the 2015 film The Revenant, an adaptation of Punke's book.

Colonel Henry Leavenworth left Fort Atkinson (now in Nebraska) with 220 men. More than 700 Yankton, Yanktonai and Lakota Indians joined him in the United States' first Indian war west of the Missouri. The Arikara retreated to their fortified village. Soon the disappointed Sioux left the battlefield. The Arikara escaped at night, and angry fur traders set their empty lodges ablaze the next morning. "This was the only time in history that any of the Three Tribes fought in open warfare against the United States".

The Bloody Hand and other Arikara chiefs signed a peace treaty with the United States (US) on July 18, 1825.

In the winter/spring of 1833 members of the Arikara Tribe ambushed Hugh Glass, Hilain Menard and Colin Rose. "A hand-written notation made on the credit side of Menard's account book page states, 'Killed by the Rees near Fort Cass Spring 1833,'" Landry wrote in his article. "The word 'Rees' was mountaineer slang for the Arikara tribe." According to a letter written by John F. A. Sanford, an Indian agent, in a July 1833 letter to William Clark, superintendent of Indian Affairs. Landry includes the excerpt in his article."They scalped them and left part of the Scalps of each tied to poles on the grounds of the murder[.]"

Years of indecision followed. The rootless Arikara lived near their southern "kinfolk," the Skidi Pawnee, for some years. They also tried their luck in hostile country far up on the Platte (now Nebraska), where Colonel Henry Dodge met them in 1835. Harassed by the numerous Sioux, the Arikara finally buried old enmity and befriended the Mandan and the Hidatsa in the late 1830s. The manager in the trading post Fort Clark observed in June 1838, how "the Rees, Mandans and Gros Ventres [Hidatsas] started out early" in a common bison hunt.

Smallpox had struck the Upper Missouri tribes the year before (and would again in 1856). It decimated the Mandan. The surviving Arikara took over the almost empty Mandan village Mitutanka next to Fort Clark. The earth lodges stood until Yankton Sioux set them on fire in January 1839. The village was rebuilt by the Arikara, who lived there until 1861. Another Sioux attack—and the need for a trading post—made them leave the settlement for good.

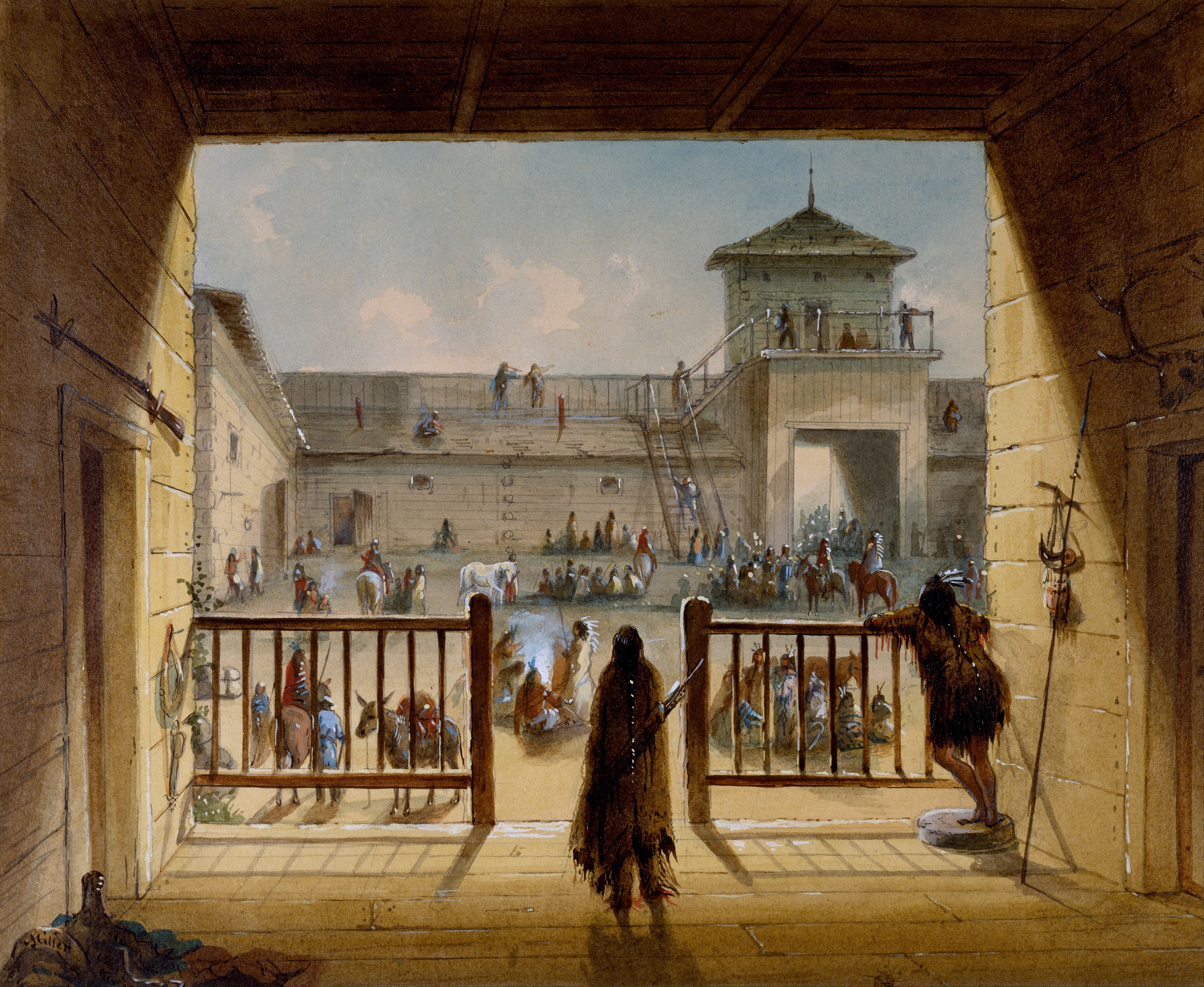
Alfred Jacob Miller - Interior of Fort Laramie - Google Art Project. One of the most important treaties between the Plains Indians was negotiated near Fort Laramie in 1851 and named after the fort. The treaty describes the territory of the different tribes.

=== 1850 to 1900 ===
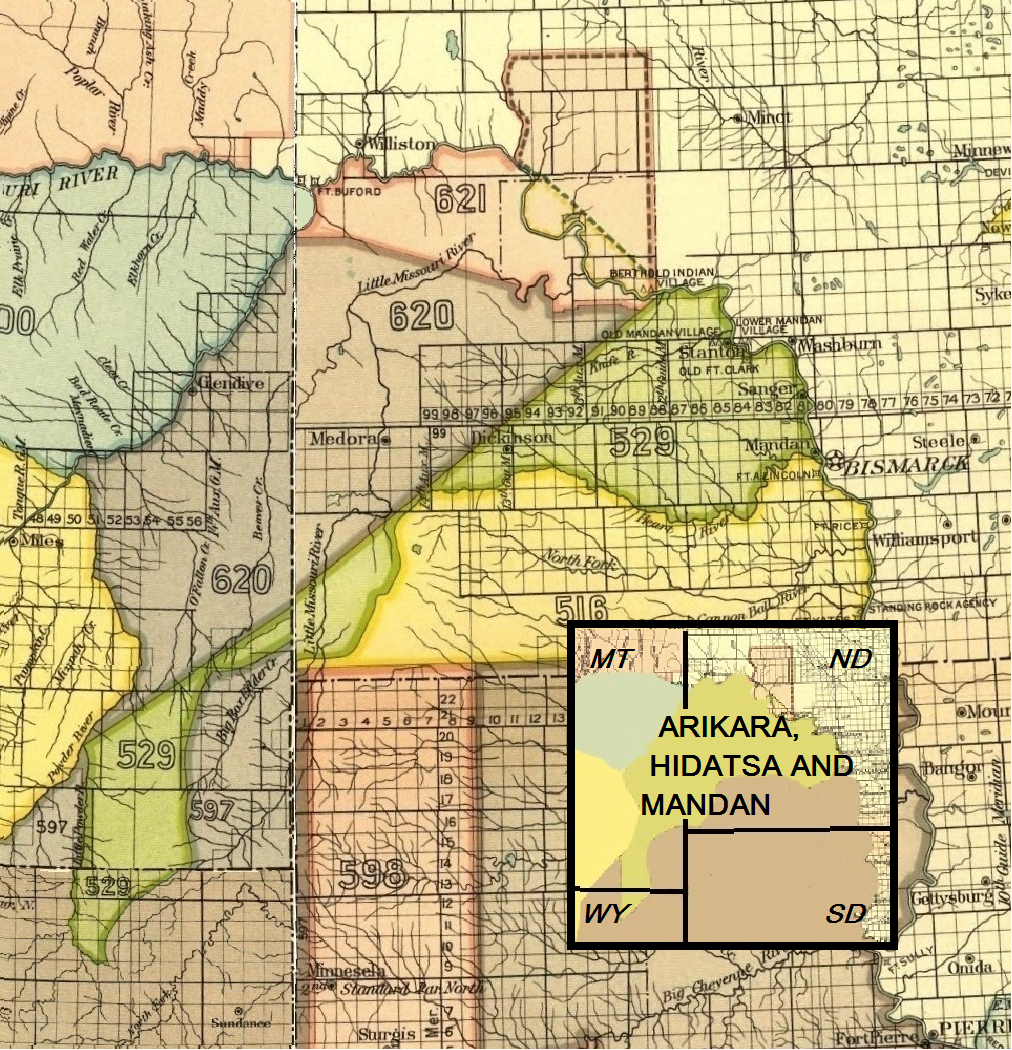
Arikara, Hidatsa and Mandan 1851 treaty territory. (Area 529, 620 and 621 south of the Missouri)

The goal of the United States in the Laramie Treaty of 1851 was to establish a permanent peace on most of the northern plains and to define tribal territories. The basic treaty area of the Arikara, the Hidatsa and the Mandan was a mutual territory north of Heart River, encircled on the east and north by the Missouri and on the west by Yellowstone River down to the mouth of Powder River. The Lakota had continued to press north after 1823, so they got treaty rights on the area along Grand River as well as other land south of Heart River.

Peace was short-lived. As drawings collected by W. J. Hoffman of Hunkpapa Chief Running Antelope showed, in 1853 he already had killed four Arikara Indians. The next year the Three Tribes called for the U. S. Army to intervene; that request was repeated the next two decades.

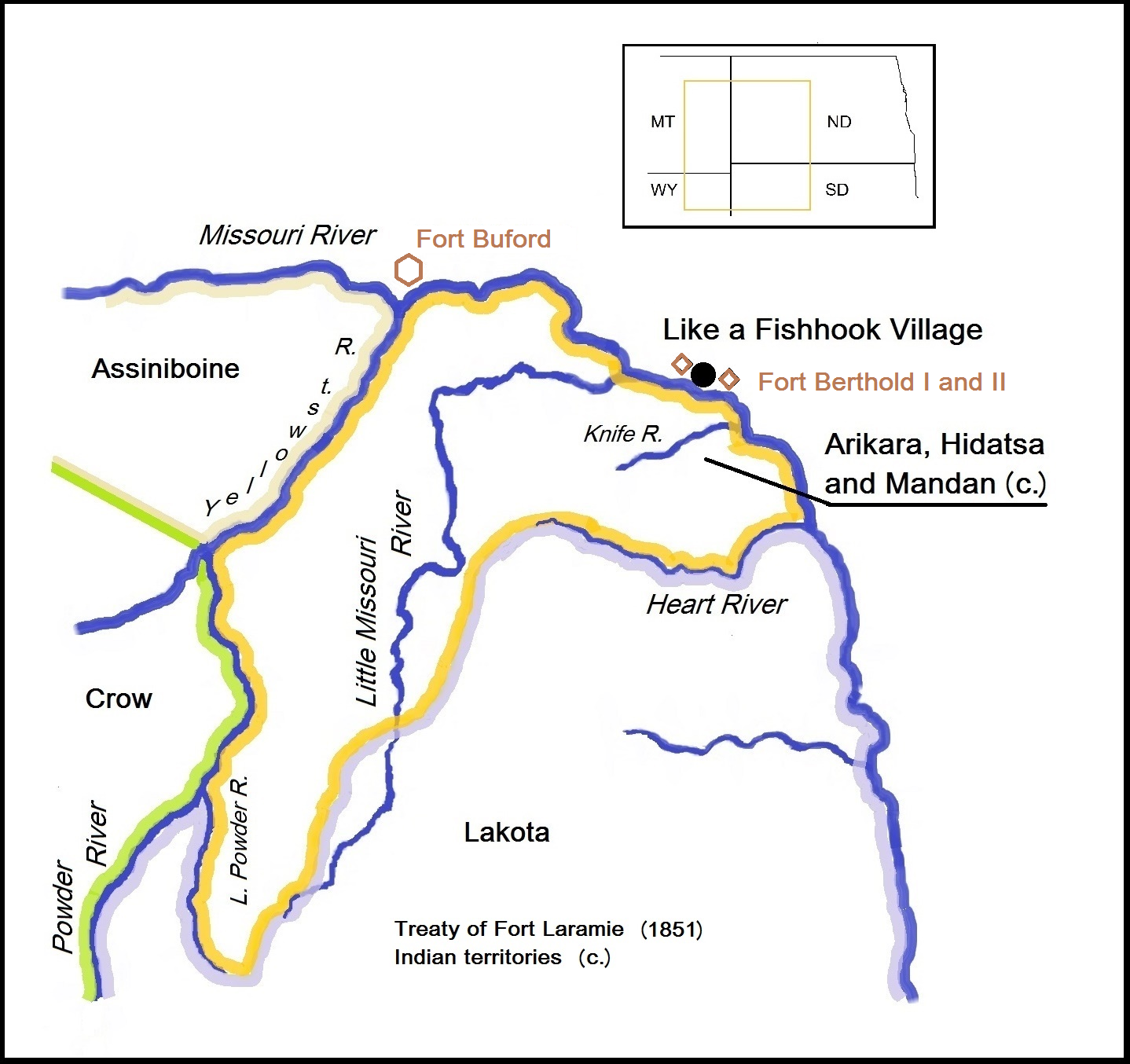
Arikara, Hidatsa and Mandan Indian territory, 1851. Like-a-Fishhook Village, Fort Berthold I and II and military post Fort Buford, North Dakota.

Arikara hunters were waylaid and had difficulties securing enough game and hides. A lengthy battle between an Arikara camp on hunt and several hundred Lakota took place in June 1858. The Arikara camp lost ten men, with 34 wounded.

The Arikara built Star Village in the spring of 1862. They had to abandon it after a fierce fight with the Sioux a few months later. The Arikara crossed the Missouri and built new earth lodges and log houses near the common Mandan and Hidatsa village Like-a-Fishhook Village. The village was built outside the Three Tribes treaty area. "We, the Arikara, have been driven from our country on the other side of the Missouri River by the Sioux", declared chief White Shield in 1864.

Like a Fishhook Village was not safe from devastation, strikes or raids for horses (and neither was the nearby trading post Fort Berthold II). Just before the end of 1862, some Sioux burned a part of the village. The affiliation of the Sioux is not always clear: Lakota, Yanktonai and "refugee" Santee Sioux from the Minnesota uprising sometimes attacked the Three Tribes. As always in intertribal warfare, there were interludes with peace - and conflicts with other Indian foes, as for example the Assiniboine.

In 1869, the Three Tribes asked the United States for guns as protection against hostile Sioux, and they finally received 300 pieces.

The Three Tribes sold a part of their southern treaty land, more or less already annexed by the Lakota, to the United States on April 12, 1870. At the same time, they got treaty on the area where Like a Fishhook Village was located.

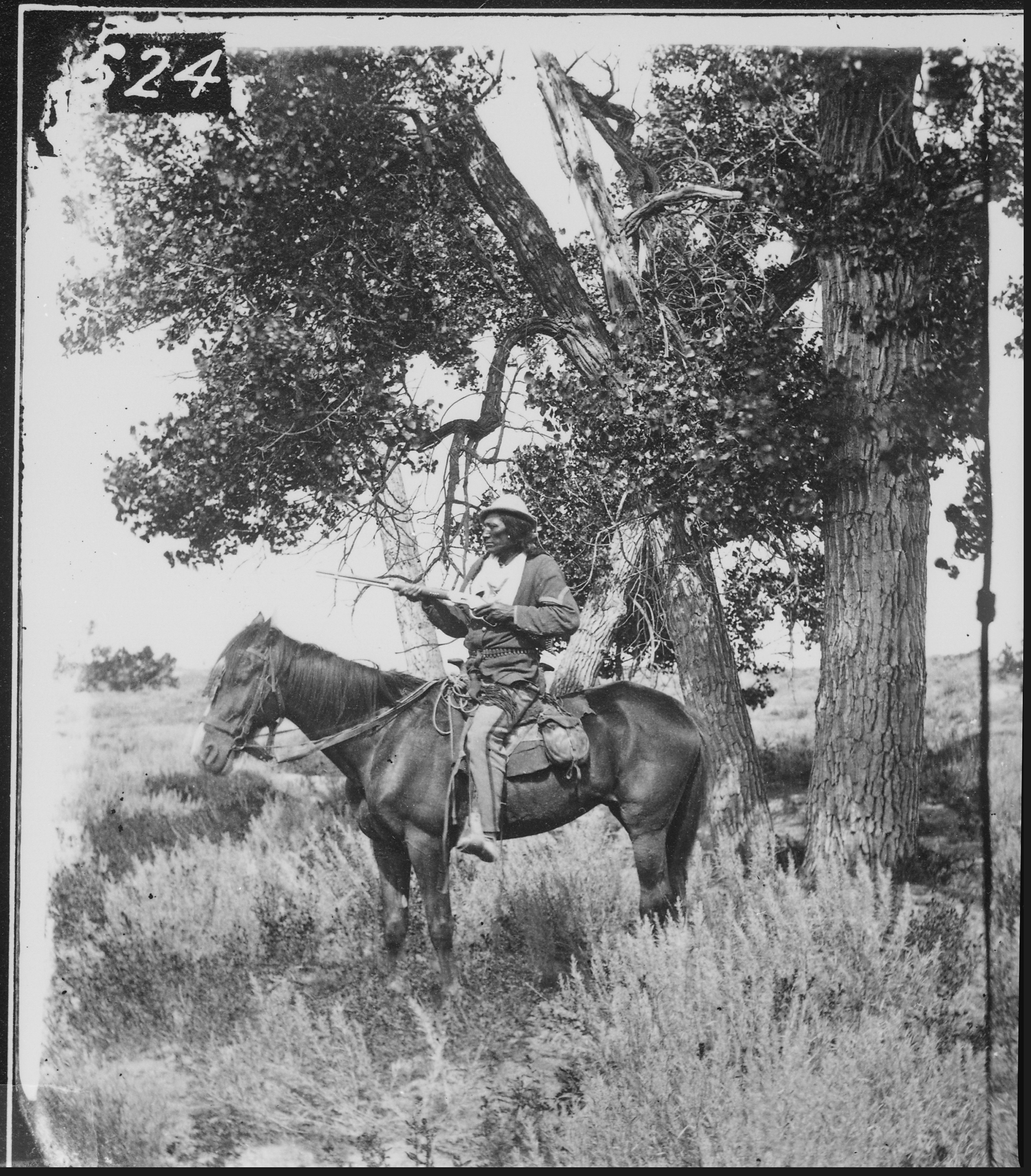
Bloody Knife, Custer's scout, on Yellowstone Expedition, 1873 - NARA - 524373. Bloody Knife was Arikara Indian, although Custer has him as Crow in his Official Report of the fight with the Lakotas at Honsinger Bluff on the Yellowstone.

In June 1874, Colonel George Armstrong Custer in Fort Abraham Lincoln (now North Dakota) received an order to delay his Black Hills Expedition and stop a large war party of Lakota on its way to attack Like a Fishhook Village. "The Rees and Mandans should be protected same as white settlers", read the order from General Phil Sheridan. Custer failed and the Lakota killed five Arikara and one Mandan.

During the Great Sioux War of 1876, some Arikara served as scouts for Custer in the Little Bighorn Campaign. The Arikara "supplied some of the most faithful and effective Indian scouts" for the Army during the war against the bands of Lakota roaming other peoples' territories in 1876-1877. "For tribes subject to Sioux pressure for decades, the combination of revenge and self-defense would constitute a powerful motivation" for joining the whites in actions like that. Custer's favorite scout, an Arikara known as Bloody Knife, fell during the Battle of the Little Bighorn in the Crow Indian Reservation (now Montana) in 1876.

"Mandans, Arickarees and Gros Ventres" were among the first Indian children to arrive at Hampton Institute, a historically black college, in Virginia for schooling, in 1878.

The Fort Berthold Indian Reservation got a new shape and size by agreement in 1886 (ratified in 1891). In 1910, the Three Tribes gave their consent to sale of land, so the reservation was reduced once more. The Arikara drifted away from Like a Fishhook Village. They raised and branded cattle instead of hunting buffalo. With the Dawes Act and "allotment in severalty" passed as another attempt at assimilation to European-American culture, each Arikara family was allotted a homestead of 160 acres in the early 1890s. The Arikara Indians were considered citizens of the United States—and no more tribal village dwellers.

The three tribes are settled on the Fort Berthold Indian Reservation in North Dakota.

== Culture ==
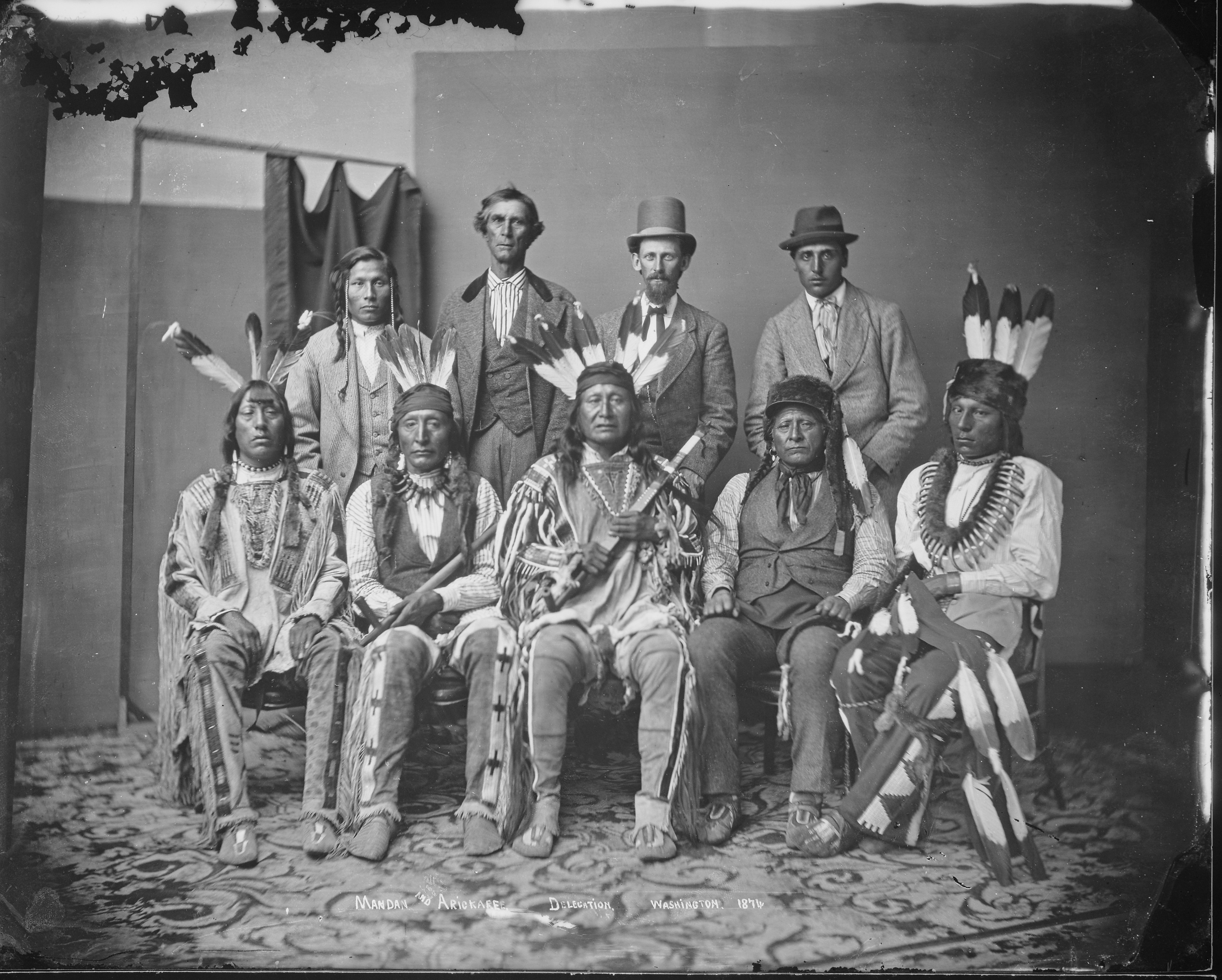
Mandan and Arikara delegation. Seated at center: Arikara chief Son of the Star

=== Language ===
The Arikara language is a member of the Caddoan language family. Arikara is close to the Pawnee language, but they are not mutually intelligible. As of 2007, the total number of remaining native speakers was reported as ten, one of whom, Maude Starr, died on 20 January 2010. She was a certified language teacher who participated in Arikara language education programs.

=== Lifestyle ===
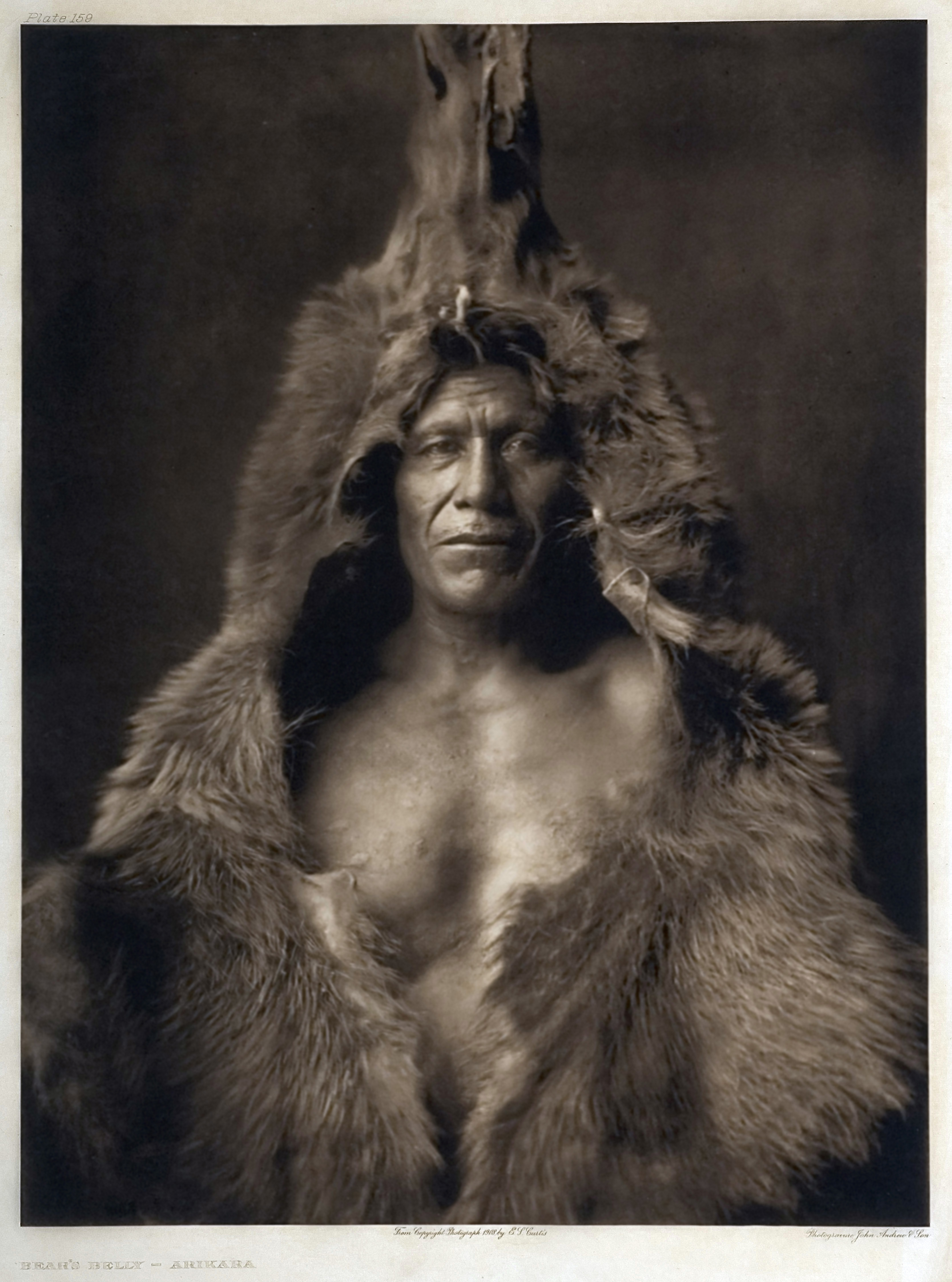
Arikara man wearing a bearskin, 1908

The Arikara lived as a semi-nomadic people on the Great Plains. During the sedentary seasons, the Arikara lived primarily in villages of earth lodges. While traveling or during the seasonal bison hunts, they erected portable tipis as temporary shelter. They were primarily an agricultural society, whose women cultivated varieties of corn (or maize). The crop was such an important staple of their society that it was referred to as "Mother Corn."

An early European, a botanist, praised the Arikara women as excellent cultivators. He had not seen finer crops anywhere in America. The surplus corn and other crops, along with tobacco, were traded to the Lakota, the Cheyenne and more southern plains tribes during short-lived truces. The amount of trading items passing through the Arikara villages made them a "trading center on the Upper Missouri". Before smallpox epidemics hit the three village tribes, they were the "most influential and affluent peoples in the Northern Plains".

Traditionally an Arikara family owned 30–40 dogs. The people used them for hunting and as sentries, but most importantly for transportation in the centuries before the Plains tribes adopted the use of horses in the 1600s. Many of the Plains tribes had used the travois, a lightweight transportation device pulled by dogs. It consisted of two long poles attached by a harness at the dog's shoulders, with the butt ends dragging behind the animal; midway, a ladder-like frame, or a hoop made of plaited thongs, was stretched between the poles; it held loads that might exceed 60 pounds. Women also used dogs to pull travois to haul firewood or infants. The travois were used to carry meat harvested during the seasonal hunts; a single dog could pull a quarter of a bison.

The Arikara played a central role in the Indigenous Great Plains trading networks based on an advantageous geographical position combined with a surplus from agriculture and craft. Historical sources show that the Arikara villages were visited by Cree, Assiniboine, Crow, Cheyenne, Arapaho, Sioux, Kiowa, Plains Apache and Comanche.

=== Mythology ===
The Arikara creation myth shows similarities with the creation myth of the neighboring Mandan people. It begins with the great sky chief Nishanu creating giants. The giants did not respect Nishanu, who had created them, and most of the giants were destroyed by a great flood. The good giants who were saved became corn kernels under the earth. Nishanu planted corn in the heavens, yielding Mother Corn, who went to the earth to lead the people out of the East into the West, but after a time, she returned to Heaven and in her absence, the people of the earth began to kill one another. She returned to the earth with a leader who taught them how to fight their enemies rather than one another. This is an "emergence" style creation myth, depicting the "Corn Mother" as giving birth to the planted seeds (the remaining good giants after the flood). The figure of the "Corn Mother" can be found in many Native American mythologies. The myth is said to reflect the migrations of the Arikara from East to West.

== In popular culture ==
In the 2015 film The Revenant, Arikara warriors act as major antagonists in the early part of the film. Trappers refer to them both by their proper name and as Ree, and the 1823 attack on Andrew Henry's trapping expedition is accurate. Furthermore, the production was noted for its efforts to reproduce Pawnee and Arikara speech as accurately as possible.

== See also ==
- Crow Creek massacre of 1325
- Mandan, Hidatsa, and Arikara Nation
- Arikara War
- Native American tribes in Nebraska
- List of Native American peoples in the United States

== Bibliography ==
- Campbell, Lyle. (1997). American Indian languages: The Historical Linguistics of Native America, New York: Oxford University Press. ISBN 0-19-509427-1.
- Mithun, Marianne. (1999). The Languages of Native North America, Cambridge: Cambridge University Press. ISBN 0-521-23228-7 (hbk); ISBN 0-521-29875-X.
