= Earth lodge =

Semi-subterranean building

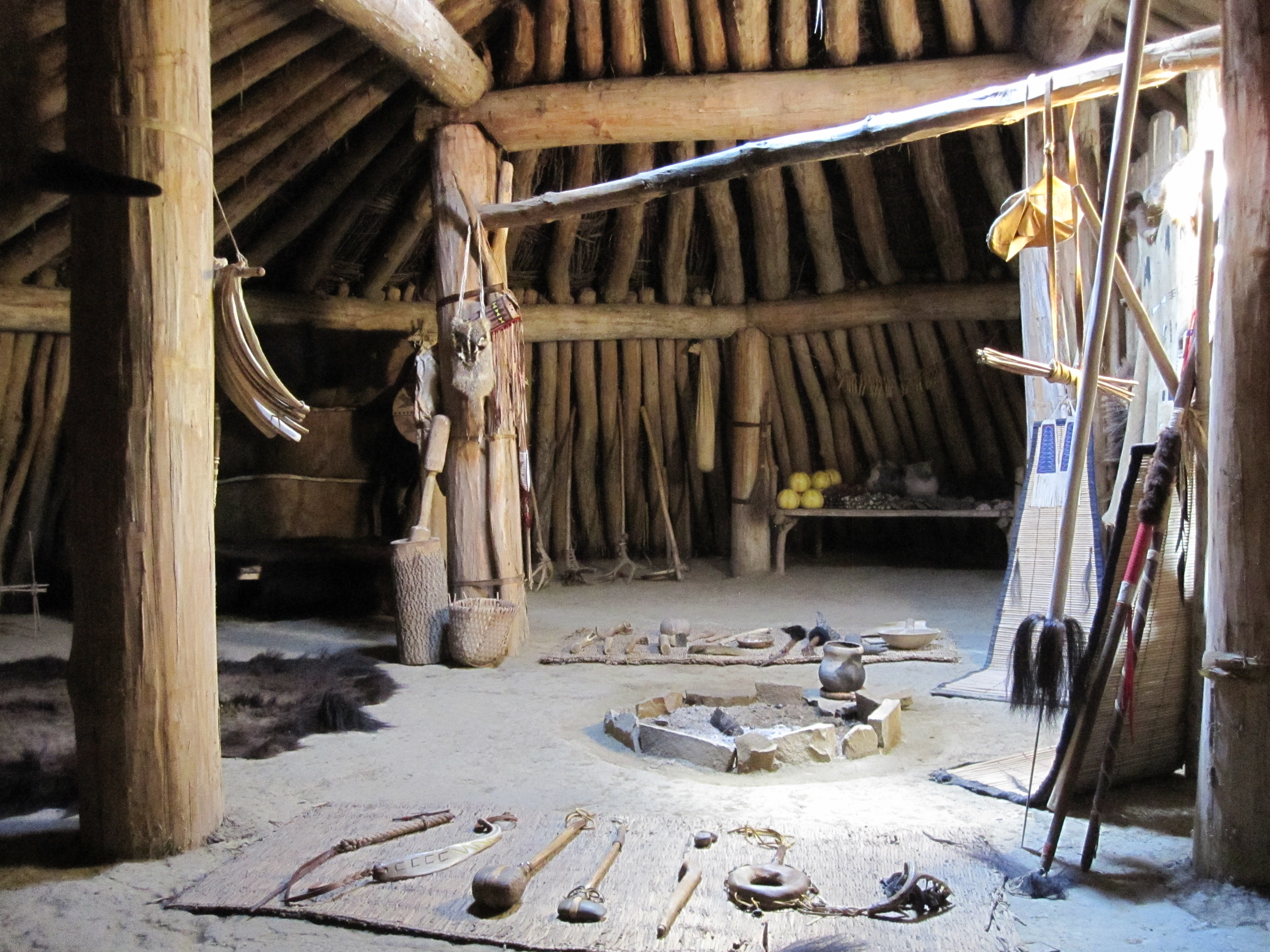
Interior of a reconstructed Mandan earth lodge at On-a-Slant village, Fort Abraham Lincoln State Park, North Dakota

An earth lodge is a semi-subterranean building covered partially or completely with earth, best known from the Native American cultures of the Great Plains and Eastern Woodlands. Earth lodges are circular, dome-shaped dwellings with heavy timber superstructures covered by thick layers of earth, typically with a central or slightly offset smoke hole at the apex and a tunnel-like entryway. The type emerged in the early 1500s and persisted into the reservation era of the late 19th century. Tribes most frequently associated with earth-lodge architecture include the Mandan, Hidatsa, Arikara, Pawnee, Otoe, Kansa, Omaha, and Ponca, although several other groups also adopted the style. Earth lodges have also been identified archaeologically at Mississippian culture sites in the southeastern United States.

With diameters of up to 60 feet (18 m), historic-period earth lodges were the largest and most complex structures built on the Plains until the 20th century.

== Origins ==
The origins of the earth lodge are not entirely clear, though it was a Northern Plains innovation. Between AD 1000 and 1400, horticultural villagers in the Central Plains built square houses, while Northern Plains villagers constructed rectangular structures. Although these earlier buildings are frequently called earth lodges, they were not true earth lodges; they were vertical-walled structures with thin coverings of wattle and daub or thatch. A few oval to circular structures appeared in northern Nebraska and central South Dakota in the 1400s, but their floor plans do not reflect the fully developed earth-lodge style.

The earliest true earth lodges were built in central North Dakota and northern South Dakota Missouri River villages in the early 1500s by the ancestors of the Mandans and Arikaras. These structures were thicker and more heavily insulated than the earlier dwellings and are thought to have been a response to the cooling temperatures of the Neoboreal ("Little Ice Age") climatic regime. The architectural style subsequently diffused from the upper Missouri as additional sedentary tribes migrated onto the Plains and adopted the form. The Pawnees were established in central Nebraska by 1600 and living in earth-lodge villages; archaeological and ethnohistorical evidence places the Otoes, Omahas, and Poncas in earth-lodge villages on the eastern margins of the Central Plains by 1700. The Cheyenne briefly adopted earth-lodge architecture in the mid-18th century during their occupancy of eastern North Dakota.

== Construction ==
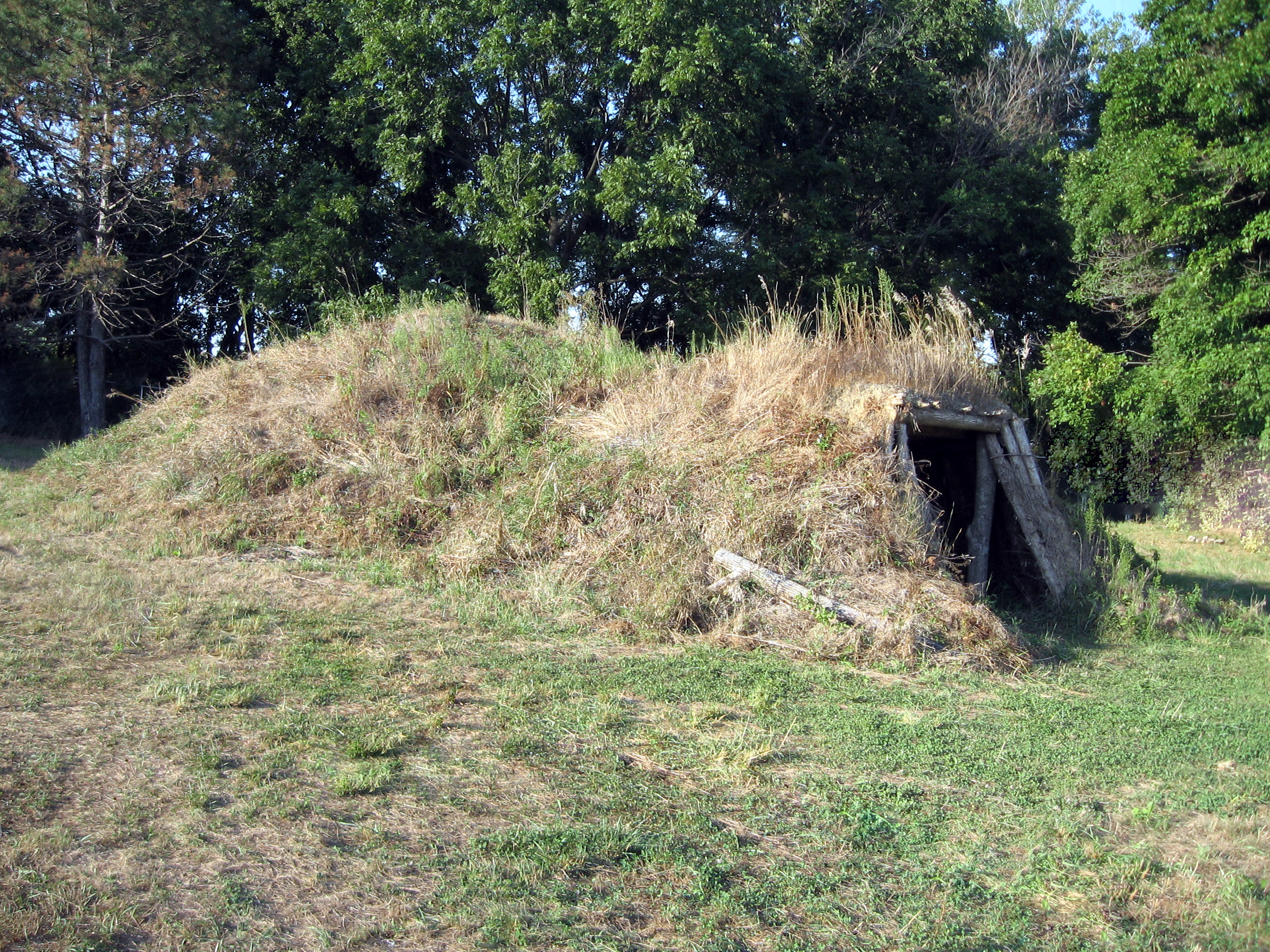
Reconstructed earth lodge, Glenwood, Iowa

Earth-lodge construction began with the excavation of a shallow circular floor pit, typically less than one foot deep, with a diameter varying between 20 and 60 feet (6.1 and 18.3 m). Heavy vertical timbers served as central roof supports: Northern Plains earth lodges almost always had four center posts, while the Pawnees, Omahas, Otoes, and other Central Plains tribes used four, six, eight, ten, or even twelve. The center posts were forked at the top and connected by horizontal beams. A secondary row of shorter posts was set around the perimeter of the floor pit, several feet inside the wall, connected at the top by horizontal cross-stringers. Closely spaced sloping posts then spanned from the top of these stringers to the ground outside the house pit, and rafters extended in spoke-like fashion from the wall stringers to the horizontal beams connecting the center posts, leaving an opening at the center for a smoke hole. Thatching and then layers of thick sod and grass covered the superstructure.

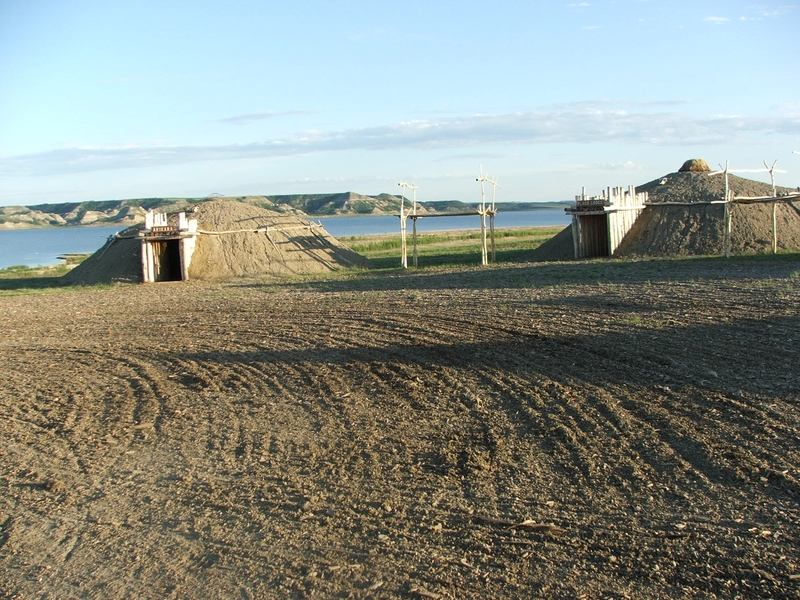
Two earth lodges in Four Bears Park

A sloping or vertical-walled entry passage extended from one side of the lodge, typically facing south or east, and could be 6 to 15 feet (1.8 to 4.6 m) in length. The earth covering and partially subterranean foundation provided thermal insulation against the extreme temperature swings of the Plains. The most common construction wood was cottonwood, a soft wood that meant lodges typically required rebuilding every seven to ten years.

Interior features included a central fire basin, one or more deep bell-shaped food storage chambers (narrow at the lodge floor and expanding to three to five feet at their bases, and five to eight feet deep), and altars or sacred areas, typically on the back wall opposite the entrance. The Hidatsa called the space between the outer vertical posts and the exterior leaning posts the atuti; this area was used for beds, firewood, tools, and other personal items. One or more extended families occupied an earth lodge, which could house up to sixty people.

=== Gender roles ===
In Hidatsa culture, men raised the large structural logs, but the rest of the construction work was done by women; a lodge was therefore considered to be the property of the woman who built it. Building an earth lodge was considered a sacred task.

== Cultural significance ==
The earth lodge was central to many aspects of Plains horticultural village life, holding important symbolic, religious, astronomical, and social significance.

In Pawnee cosmology, the earth lodge symbolically represented the heavens. The circular floor represented the earth and the domed ceiling the sky; the entrance faced east, toward the Morning Star, so that people entered the lodge as stars enter the sky, and the altar on the western side represented the domain of the Evening Star and symbolized creation and renewal. The four center posts represented the four cardinal directions and four primary stars. Pawnee earth lodges also functioned as astronomical observatories: the smoke hole and east-facing doorway were designed to permit observation of celestial bodies, and at the vernal equinox the first rays of the sun would strike the altar within the lodge.

Mandan and Hidatsa lodges also carried sacred symbolism, and special earth lodges were reserved for ceremonial activities such as the Mandan Okipa, a four-day ceremony of renewal.

== Villages ==
Villages consisted of at least a dozen earth lodges and in many cases more than a hundred, and it was not uncommon for villages to be home to several thousand people. Earth lodges were often closely spaced, and during times of conflict an earth or timber fortification wall surrounded the community. Earth lodges were typically built alongside tribal farm fields near river and stream floodplains, where cultivation was easier; tipis were used as temporary shelters during the seasonal bison hunts on the open plains.

=== Reconstructions and preservation ===
Several reconstructed earth lodges are open to the public. The National Park Service built a replica at the Knife River Indian Villages National Historic Site near Stanton, North Dakota, and several replica lodges are located at Fort Abraham Lincoln State Park south of Mandan, North Dakota. A reconstructed earth lodge can also be seen at Glenwood Lake Park in Glenwood, Iowa. At New Town, North Dakota, a village of six family-sized earth lodges (roughly 40 feet (12 m) in diameter) and one large ceremonial lodge (more than 90 feet (27 m) in diameter) was constructed by the Mandan, Hidatsa, and Arikara Nation of the Fort Berthold Indian Reservation, the first village of its kind built by the three affiliated tribes in over 100 years.

== Mississippian culture ==
A number of major Mississippian culture mound centers have yielded earth lodge-type ceremonial structures, either beneath (i.e. preceding) mound construction or as mound-top buildings. The most fully documented examples are at Ocmulgee National Monument in Georgia. The relationship, if any, between these southeastern structures and the Plains dwellings is unclear. Sequential construction, collapse, and rebuilding of earth lodges appears to have been part of the mechanism of mound construction at sites including Town Creek Indian Mound and some of the mounds at Ocmulgee.

In Kanabec County, Minnesota, the Groundhouse River was named for the earth lodges of the Hidatsa, who lived in the area before being driven westward to the Missouri River by the Sioux.

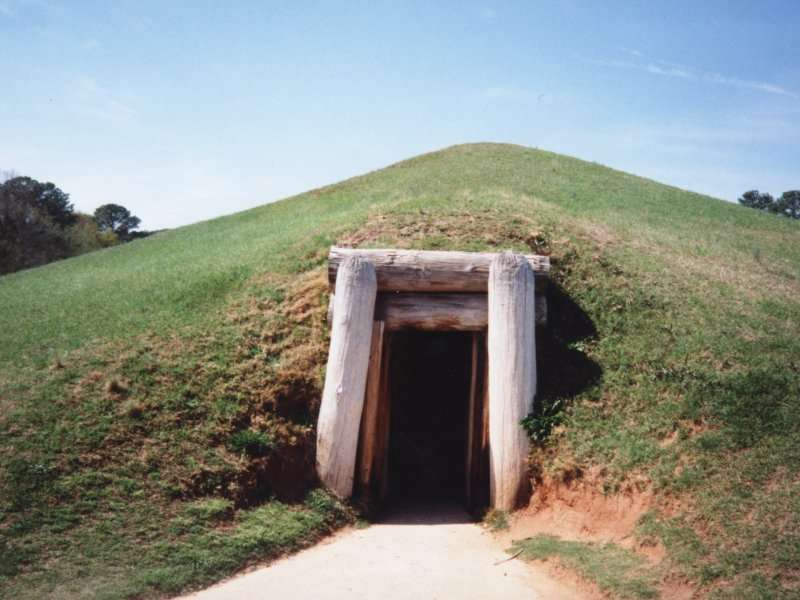
Ocmulgee earth lodge

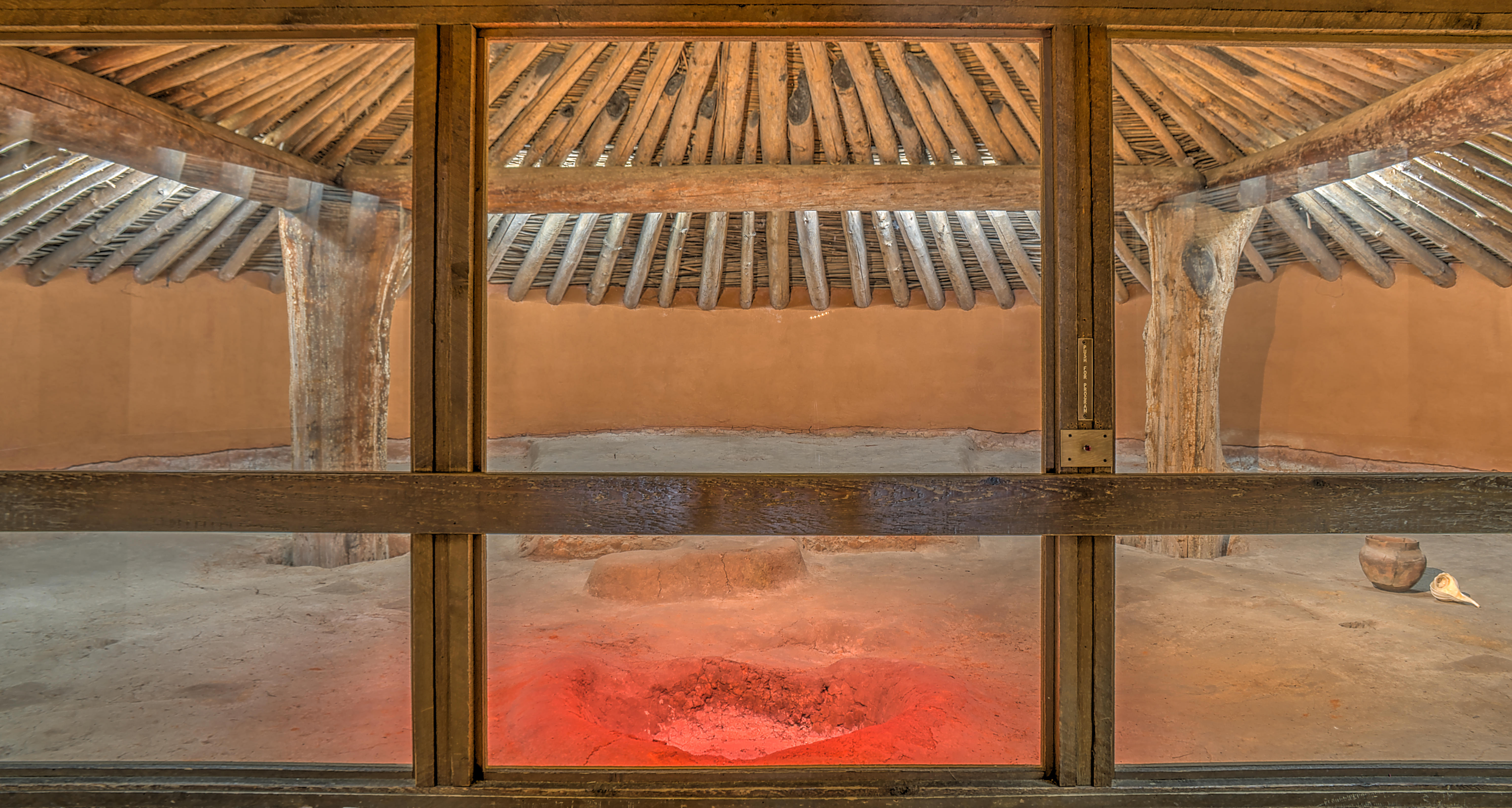
Interior of Ocmulgee earth lodge

== See also ==
- Earth house
- Kiva
- Quiggly hole
- Zemlyanka
- Vernacular architecture
