= List of municipalities in South Dakota =

A map of the United States of America with the state of South Dakota highlighted

South Dakota is a state located in the Midwestern United States. As of the 2020 census, 886,667 lived in South Dakota, further growing to 935,094 in the 2025 estimate.

South Dakota is the fifth-least populous state and 16th-largest by land area, spanning 75,809.288 square miles (196,345.15 km^{2}) of land. South Dakota is divided into 66 counties and contains 310 municipalities consisting of 157 cities, 152 towns, and 1 village.

South Dakota's municipalities cover only 1.72% of the state's land mass but are home to 93.84% of its population.

The largest municipality by population in South Dakota is the city of Sioux Falls with 213,748 residents, and the smallest municipality by population is Hillsview with 1 resident in 2025.

The largest municipality by land area is Sioux Falls which spans 85.655 mi^{2} (221.85 km^{2}), while Strandburg is the smallest at 0.075 mi^{2} (0.19 km^{2}) in 2026.

== Municipalities ==
County seat
State capital and county seat

2025 rank	Municipality	Designation	Primary county	Secondary county(ies)	Land area (2026)	Population density (2026)	Population		
2025 rank	Municipality	Designation	Primary county	Secondary county(ies)	Land area (2026)	Population density (2026)	2025 Estimate	2020 census	2020–2025 Change
1	Sioux Falls	City	Minnehaha	Lincoln	85.655 square miles (221.85 km^{2})	2,495.453/sq mi (963.500/km^{2})	213,748	192,517	+11.03%
2	Rapid City	City	Pennington		55.987 square miles (145.01 km^{2})	1,439.423/sq mi (555.764/km^{2})	80,589	74,703	+7.88%
3	Aberdeen	City	Brown		16.970 square miles (43.95 km^{2})	1,647.67/sq mi (636.170/km^{2})	27,961	28,495	−1.87%
4	Brookings	City	Brookings		14.114 square miles (36.56 km^{2})	1,796.44/sq mi (693.61/km^{2})	25,355	23,377	+8.46%
5	Watertown	City	Codington		18.802 square miles (48.70 km^{2})	1,262.42/sq mi (487.423/km^{2})	23,736	22,655	+4.77%
6	Yankton	City	Yankton		8.739 square miles (22.63 km^{2})	1,809.82/sq mi (698.77/km^{2})	15,816	15,411	+2.63%
7	Mitchell	City	Davison		11.586 square miles (30.01 km^{2})	1,359.92/sq mi (525.07/km^{2})	15,756	15,660	+0.61%
8	Huron	City	Beadle		9.846 square miles (25.50 km^{2})	1,483.55/sq mi (572.80/km^{2})	14,607	14,263	+2.41%
9	Spearfish	City	Lawrence		17.270 square miles (44.73 km^{2})	819.57/sq mi (316.438/km^{2})	14,154	12,193	+16.08%
10	Box Elder	City	Pennington	Meade	14.863 square miles (38.49 km^{2})	937.63/sq mi (362.021/km^{2})	13,936	11,746	+18.64%
11	Pierre	City	Hughes		13.027 square miles (33.74 km^{2})	1,063.02/sq mi (410.435/km^{2})	13,848	14,091	−1.72%
12	Vermillion	City	Clay		4.915 square miles (12.73 km^{2})	2,384.5/sq mi (920.7/km^{2})	11,720	11,695	+0.21%
13	Brandon	City	Minnehaha		6.103 square miles (15.81 km^{2})	1,852.53/sq mi (715.27/km^{2})	11,306	11,048	+2.34%
14	Harrisburg	City	Lincoln		4.769 square miles (12.35 km^{2})	2,181.8/sq mi (842.40/km^{2})	10,405	6,732	+54.56%
15	Tea	City	Lincoln		3.885 square miles (10.06 km^{2})	2,064.1/sq mi (796.95/km^{2})	8,019	5,598	+43.25%
16	Sturgis	City	Meade		6.558 square miles (16.99 km^{2})	1,055.50/sq mi (407.53/km^{2})	6,922	7,020	−1.40%
17	Madison	City	Lake		4.616 square miles (11.96 km^{2})	1,313.91/sq mi (507.30/km^{2})	6,065	6,191	−2.04%
18	Belle Fourche	City	Butte		9.074 square miles (23.50 km^{2})	638.20/sq mi (246.41/km^{2})	5,791	5,617	+3.10%
19	Dell Rapids	City	Minnehaha		2.254 square miles (5.84 km^{2})	1,709.0/sq mi (659.83/km^{2})	3,852	3,996	−3.60%
20	Hot Springs	City	Fall River		4.362 square miles (11.30 km^{2})	841.4/sq mi (324.8/km^{2})	3,670	3,395	+8.10%
21	Hartford	City	Minnehaha		3.744 square miles (9.70 km^{2})	970.89/sq mi (374.86/km^{2})	3,635	3,354	+8.38%
22	Milbank	City	Grant		2.774 square miles (7.18 km^{2})	1,266.0/sq mi (488.82/km^{2})	3,512	3,544	−0.90%
23	Mobridge	City	Walworth		1.960 square miles (5.08 km^{2})	1,628.6/sq mi (628.79/km^{2})	3,192	3,261	−2.12%
24	Lead	City	Lawrence		2.058 square miles (5.33 km^{2})	1,488.8/sq mi (574.84/km^{2})	3,064	2,982	+2.75%
25	North Sioux City	City	Union		3.335 square miles (8.64 km^{2})	910.34/sq mi (351.49/km^{2})	3,036	3,042	−0.20%
26	Summerset	City	Meade		3.003 square miles (7.78 km^{2})	1,009.0/sq mi (389.6/km^{2})	3,030	2,972	+1.95%
27	Canton	City	Lincoln		3.270 square miles (8.47 km^{2})	917.74/sq mi (354.34/km^{2})	3,001	3,066	−2.12%
28	Winner	City	Tripp		2.292 square miles (5.94 km^{2})	1,295.4/sq mi (500.15/km^{2})	2,969	2,921	+1.64%
29	Lennox	City	Lincoln		1.823 square miles (4.72 km^{2})	1,457.5/sq mi (562.74/km^{2})	2,657	2,423	+9.66%
30	Volga	City	Brookings		1.152 square miles (2.98 km^{2})	2,133.7/sq mi (823.8/km^{2})	2,458	2,113	+16.33%
31	Chamberlain	City	Brule		4.479 square miles (11.60 km^{2})	547.67/sq mi (211.46/km^{2})	2,453	2,473	−0.81%
32	Sisseton	City	Roberts		1.591 square miles (4.12 km^{2})	1,516.7/sq mi (585.58/km^{2})	2,413	2,479	−2.66%
33	Flandreau	City	Moody		1.859 square miles (4.81 km^{2})	1,288.9/sq mi (497.63/km^{2})	2,396	2,372	+1.01%
34	Fort Pierre	City	Stanley		3.119 square miles (8.08 km^{2})	694.45/sq mi (268.13/km^{2})	2,166	2,115	+2.41%
35	Redfield	City	Spink		1.928 square miles (4.99 km^{2})	1,096.5/sq mi (423.35/km^{2})	2,114	2,214	−4.52%
36	Beresford	City	Union	Lincoln	1.784 square miles (4.62 km^{2})	1,179.9/sq mi (455.57/km^{2})	2,105	2,180	−3.44%
37	Elk Point	City	Union		1.549 square miles (4.01 km^{2})	1,343/sq mi (518.5/km^{2})	2,080	2,149	−3.21%
38	Springfield	City	Bon Homme		1.031 square miles (2.67 km^{2})	1,868.1/sq mi (721.3/km^{2})	1,926	1,914	+0.63%
39	Custer	City	Custer		2.530 square miles (6.55 km^{2})	712.6/sq mi (275.16/km^{2})	1,803	1,919	−6.04%
40	Webster	City	Day		1.769 square miles (4.58 km^{2})	950.3/sq mi (366.90/km^{2})	1,681	1,728	−2.72%
41	Parkston	City	Hutchinson		1.307 square miles (3.39 km^{2})	1,178/sq mi (454.9/km^{2})	1,540	1,567	−1.72%
42	Wagner	City	Charles Mix		1.858 square miles (4.81 km^{2})	765.3/sq mi (295.50/km^{2})	1,422	1,490	−4.56%
43	Crooks	City	Minnehaha		1.291 square miles (3.34 km^{2})	1,096.0/sq mi (423.19/km^{2})	1,415	1,362	+3.89%
44	Deadwood	City	Lawrence		4.929 square miles (12.77 km^{2})	275.9/sq mi (106.5/km^{2})	1,360	1,156	+17.65%
45	Salem	City	McCook		1.250 square miles (3.24 km^{2})	1,085.6/sq mi (419.2/km^{2})	1,357	1,325	+2.42%
46	Parker	City	Turner		1.185 square miles (3.07 km^{2})	1,138.4/sq mi (439.5/km^{2})	1,349	1,194	+12.98%
47	Baltic	City	Minnehaha		0.738 square miles (1.91 km^{2})	1,821.1/sq mi (703.1/km^{2})	1,344	1,246	+7.87%
48	Groton	City	Brown		1.751 square miles (4.54 km^{2})	763.6/sq mi (294.81/km^{2})	1,337	1,380	−3.12%
49	Miller	City	Hand		1.060 square miles (2.75 km^{2})	1,238.7/sq mi (478.3/km^{2})	1,313	1,349	−2.67%
50	Freeman	City	Hutchinson		1.489 square miles (3.86 km^{2})	876.4/sq mi (338.39/km^{2})	1,305	1,329	−1.81%
51	Aurora	Town	Brookings		0.961 square miles (2.49 km^{2})	1,338.2/sq mi (516.7/km^{2})	1,286	1,047	+22.83%
52	Eagle Butte	City	Dewey	Ziebach	1.362 square miles (3.53 km^{2})	931.7/sq mi (359.74/km^{2})	1,269	1,258	+0.87%
53	Gregory	City	Gregory		1.721 square miles (4.46 km^{2})	726.3/sq mi (280.4/km^{2})	1,250	1,221	+2.38%
54	Piedmont	City	Meade		1.820 square miles (4.71 km^{2})	684.1/sq mi (264.12/km^{2})	1,245	971	+28.22%
55	Platte	City	Charles Mix		1.052 square miles (2.72 km^{2})	1,169/sq mi (451.4/km^{2})	1,230	1,296	−5.09%
56	Clear Lake	City	Deuel		3.438 square miles (8.90 km^{2})	354.9/sq mi (137.0/km^{2})	1,220	1,218	+0.16%
57	Britton	City	Marshall		0.727 square miles (1.88 km^{2})	1,649.2/sq mi (636.8/km^{2})	1,199	1,215	−1.32%
58	Clark	City	Clark		1.353 square miles (3.50 km^{2})	874.4/sq mi (337.59/km^{2})	1,183	1,148	+3.05%
59	Garretson	City	Minnehaha		1.456 square miles (3.77 km^{2})	806.3/sq mi (311.32/km^{2})	1,174	1,228	−4.40%
60	Lemmon	City	Perkins		1.098 square miles (2.84 km^{2})	1,054.6/sq mi (407.2/km^{2})	1,158	1,160	−0.17%
61	Tyndall	City	Bon Homme		1.578 square miles (4.09 km^{2})	707.9/sq mi (273.31/km^{2})	1,117	1,057	+5.68%
62	Mission	City	Todd		0.587 square miles (1.52 km^{2})	1,875.6/sq mi (724.2/km^{2})	1,101	1,156	−4.76%
63	Gettysburg	City	Potter		1.921 square miles (4.98 km^{2})	546.1/sq mi (210.84/km^{2})	1,049	1,104	−4.98%
64	De Smet	Town	Kingsbury		1.158 square miles (3.00 km^{2})	891.2/sq mi (344.09/km^{2})	1,032	1,056	−2.27%
65	Centerville	City	Turner		0.720 square miles (1.86 km^{2})	1,366.7/sq mi (527.7/km^{2})	984	918	+7.19%
66	Whitewood	City	Lawrence		0.668 square miles (1.73 km^{2})	1,468.6/sq mi (567.0/km^{2})	981	879	+11.60%
67	Hill City	City	Pennington		1.318 square miles (3.41 km^{2})	711.7/sq mi (274.78/km^{2})	938	872	+7.57%
68	Ipswich	City	Edmunds		1.340 square miles (3.47 km^{2})	697.8/sq mi (269.41/km^{2})	935	928	+0.75%
69	Martin	City	Bennett		0.560 square miles (1.45 km^{2})	1,661/sq mi (641/km^{2})	930	938	−0.85%
70	Worthing	City	Lincoln		0.561 square miles (1.45 km^{2})	1,652.4/sq mi (638.0/km^{2})	927	927	0.00%
71	Arlington	City	Kingsbury	Brookings	1.718 square miles (4.45 km^{2})	539.0/sq mi (208.11/km^{2})	926	915	+1.20%
72	Marion	City	Turner		0.868 square miles (2.25 km^{2})	1,031.1/sq mi (398.1/km^{2})	895	849	+5.42%
73	Valley Springs	City	Minnehaha		0.985 square miles (2.55 km^{2})	902.5/sq mi (348.5/km^{2})	889	885	+0.45%
74	Viborg	City	Turner		0.519 square miles (1.34 km^{2})	1,643.5/sq mi (634.6/km^{2})	853	814	+4.79%
75	Howard	City	Miner		0.965 square miles (2.50 km^{2})	868.4/sq mi (335.3/km^{2})	838	848	−1.18%
76	Faulkton	City	Faulk		1.013 square miles (2.62 km^{2})	816.4/sq mi (315.2/km^{2})	827	826	+0.12%
77	Scotland	City	Bon Homme		0.895 square miles (2.32 km^{2})	898.3/sq mi (346.8/km^{2})	804	785	+2.42%
78	Elkton	City	Brookings		1.494 square miles (3.87 km^{2})	534.8/sq mi (206.49/km^{2})	799	755	+5.83%
79	Estelline	City	Hamlin		0.945 square miles (2.45 km^{2})	838.1/sq mi (323.6/km^{2})	792	749	+5.74%
80	Plankinton	City	Aurora		0.763 square miles (1.98 km^{2})	1,018.3/sq mi (393.2/km^{2})	777	781	−0.51%
81	Alcester	City	Union		1.029 square miles (2.67 km^{2})	754.1/sq mi (291.2/km^{2})	776	820	−5.37%
82	Eureka	City	McPherson		0.933 square miles (2.42 km^{2})	830.7/sq mi (320.7/km^{2})	775	813	−4.67%
83	Edgemont	City	Fall River		1.382 square miles (3.58 km^{2})	557/sq mi (215.1/km^{2})	770	725	+6.21%
84	Wessington Springs	City	Jerauld		1.801 square miles (4.66 km^{2})	418.1/sq mi (161.43/km^{2})	753	771	−2.33%
85	Philip	City	Haakon		0.622 square miles (1.61 km^{2})	1,190/sq mi (459/km^{2})	740	759	−2.50%
86	Castlewood	City	Hamlin		1.150 square miles (2.98 km^{2})	642.6/sq mi (248.11/km^{2})	739	698	+5.87%
87	Armour	City	Douglas		0.944 square miles (2.44 km^{2})	768.0/sq mi (296.5/km^{2})	725	698	+3.87%
88	Colman	City	Moody		1.884 square miles (4.88 km^{2})	369.4/sq mi (142.64/km^{2})	696	634	+9.78%
89	Colton	City	Minnehaha		0.701 square miles (1.82 km^{2})	980.0/sq mi (378.4/km^{2})	687	738	−6.91%
90	Lake Andes	City	Charles Mix		0.746 square miles (1.93 km^{2})	920.9/sq mi (355.6/km^{2})	687	710	−3.24%
91	Wall	Town	Pennington		2.630 square miles (6.81 km^{2})	253.99/sq mi (98.07/km^{2})	668	699	−4.43%
92	Canistota	City	McCook		0.561 square miles (1.45 km^{2})	1,183.6/sq mi (457.0/km^{2})	664	631	+5.23%
93	Alexandria	City	Hanson		0.624 square miles (1.62 km^{2})	1,049.7/sq mi (405.3/km^{2})	655	649	+0.92%
94	Lake Norden	City	Hamlin		1.080 square miles (2.80 km^{2})	602.8/sq mi (232.73/km^{2})	651	554	+17.51%
95	Woonsocket	City	Sanborn		0.784 square miles (2.03 km^{2})	827.8/sq mi (319.6/km^{2})	649	631	+2.85%
96	Onida	City	Sully		0.672 square miles (1.74 km^{2})	952/sq mi (367.7/km^{2})	640	666	−3.90%
97	Highmore	City	Hyde		1.885 square miles (4.88 km^{2})	336.3/sq mi (129.86/km^{2})	634	682	−7.04%
98	Avon	City	Bon Homme		0.648 square miles (1.68 km^{2})	961.4/sq mi (371.2/km^{2})	623	586	+6.31%
99	Menno	City	Hutchinson		0.521 square miles (1.35 km^{2})	1,193.9/sq mi (461.0/km^{2})	622	614	+1.30%
100	Lake Preston	City	Kingsbury		0.759 square miles (1.97 km^{2})	797.1/sq mi (307.8/km^{2})	605	589	+2.72%
101	Selby	City	Walworth		0.712 square miles (1.84 km^{2})	840/sq mi (325/km^{2})	600	610	−1.64%
102	New Underwood	City	Pennington		1.663 square miles (4.31 km^{2})	357.2/sq mi (137.91/km^{2})	594	590	+0.68%
103	Burke	City	Gregory		0.559 square miles (1.45 km^{2})	1,055/sq mi (408/km^{2})	590	575	+2.61%
104	White River	City	Mellette		0.521 square miles (1.35 km^{2})	1,128.6/sq mi (435.8/km^{2})	588	533	+10.32%
105	Kimball	City	Brule		3.437 square miles (8.90 km^{2})	168.17/sq mi (64.93/km^{2})	578	572	+1.05%
106	White	City	Brookings		0.860 square miles (2.23 km^{2})	664.0/sq mi (256.4/km^{2})	571	537	+6.33%
107	Newell	City	Butte		1.012 square miles (2.62 km^{2})	563/sq mi (217.5/km^{2})	570	584	−2.40%
108	Humboldt	City	Minnehaha		0.619 square miles (1.60 km^{2})	919.2/sq mi (354.9/km^{2})	569	579	−1.73%
109	Corsica	City	Douglas		0.837 square miles (2.17 km^{2})	673.8/sq mi (260.2/km^{2})	564	561	+0.53%
110	Tripp	City	Hutchinson		0.593 square miles (1.54 km^{2})	949.4/sq mi (366.6/km^{2})	563	575	−2.09%
111	McLaughlin	City	Corson		0.404 square miles (1.05 km^{2})	1,363.9/sq mi (526.6/km^{2})	551	569	−3.16%
112	Timber Lake	City	Dewey		0.611 square miles (1.58 km^{2})	896.9/sq mi (346.3/km^{2})	548	509	+7.66%
113	Kadoka	City	Jackson		2.285 square miles (5.92 km^{2})	226.70/sq mi (87.53/km^{2})	518	543	−4.60%
114	Bridgewater	City	McCook		1.125 square miles (2.91 km^{2})	459.6/sq mi (177.44/km^{2})	517	511	+1.17%
115	Dupree	City	Ziebach		0.392 square miles (1.02 km^{2})	1,255.1/sq mi (484.6/km^{2})	492	494	−0.40%
116	Bryant	City	Hamlin		0.524 square miles (1.36 km^{2})	931.3/sq mi (359.6/km^{2})	488	471	+3.61%
117	Hayti	Town	Hamlin		0.458 square miles (1.19 km^{2})	1,052.4/sq mi (406.3/km^{2})	482	393	+22.65%
118	Murdo	City	Jones		0.629 square miles (1.63 km^{2})	766.3/sq mi (295.9/km^{2})	482	475	+1.47%
119	Montrose	City	McCook		0.421 square miles (1.09 km^{2})	1,130.6/sq mi (436.5/km^{2})	476	468	+1.71%
120	Bowdle	City	Edmunds		0.640 square miles (1.66 km^{2})	740.6/sq mi (286.0/km^{2})	474	470	+0.85%
121	Waubay	City	Day		1.456 square miles (3.77 km^{2})	325.5/sq mi (125.70/km^{2})	474	473	+0.21%
122	Wolsey	Town	Beadle		2.265 square miles (5.87 km^{2})	207.95/sq mi (80.29/km^{2})	471	459	+2.61%
123	Emery	City	Hanson		0.457 square miles (1.18 km^{2})	1,017.5/sq mi (392.9/km^{2})	465	484	−3.93%
124	Presho	City	Lyman		0.671 square miles (1.74 km^{2})	690.0/sq mi (266.4/km^{2})	463	472	−1.91%
125	Mount Vernon	City	Davison		0.343 square miles (0.89 km^{2})	1,347/sq mi (520.1/km^{2})	462	461	+0.22%
126	St. Francis	Town	Todd		0.362 square miles (0.94 km^{2})	1,240.3/sq mi (478.9/km^{2})	449	469	−4.26%
127	Warner	Town	Brown		0.279 square miles (0.72 km^{2})	1,609/sq mi (621.4/km^{2})	449	485	−7.42%
128	Jefferson	City	Union		0.510 square miles (1.32 km^{2})	878.4/sq mi (339.2/km^{2})	448	475	−5.68%
129	Irene	City	Clay	Turner, Yankton	0.285 square miles (0.74 km^{2})	1,540/sq mi (594.7/km^{2})	439	422	+4.03%
130	Wilmot	City	Roberts		0.533 square miles (1.38 km^{2})	793.6/sq mi (306.4/km^{2})	423	432	−2.08%
131	Herreid	City	Campbell		1.435 square miles (3.72 km^{2})	289.2/sq mi (111.66/km^{2})	415	416	−0.24%
132	Tabor	Town	Bon Homme		0.379 square miles (0.98 km^{2})	1,089.7/sq mi (420.7/km^{2})	413	407	+1.47%
133	Leola	City	McPherson		0.742 square miles (1.92 km^{2})	553.9/sq mi (213.9/km^{2})	411	434	−5.30%
134	White Lake	City	Aurora		0.405 square miles (1.05 km^{2})	1,012/sq mi (391/km^{2})	410	394	+4.06%
135	Big Stone City	City	Grant		1.198 square miles (3.10 km^{2})	338.9/sq mi (130.85/km^{2})	406	412	−1.46%
136	Hurley	City	Turner		0.616 square miles (1.60 km^{2})	634.7/sq mi (245.1/km^{2})	391	379	+3.17%
137	Oacoma	Town	Lyman		2.625 square miles (6.80 km^{2})	148.95/sq mi (57.51/km^{2})	391	386	+1.30%
138	Gayville	Town	Yankton		0.242 square miles (0.63 km^{2})	1,550/sq mi (598.3/km^{2})	375	382	−1.83%
139	Hermosa	Town	Custer		0.865 square miles (2.24 km^{2})	428/sq mi (165.2/km^{2})	370	382	−3.14%
140	Rosholt	Town	Roberts		0.296 square miles (0.77 km^{2})	1,250/sq mi (483/km^{2})	370	379	−2.37%
141	Ethan	Town	Davison		0.255 square miles (0.66 km^{2})	1,424/sq mi (549.6/km^{2})	363	365	−0.55%
142	Buffalo	Town	Harding		0.554 square miles (1.43 km^{2})	646.2/sq mi (249.5/km^{2})	358	346	+3.47%
143	Hoven	Town	Potter		0.306 square miles (0.79 km^{2})	1,160/sq mi (447.9/km^{2})	355	379	−6.33%
144	Faith	City	Meade		1.277 square miles (3.31 km^{2})	271.7/sq mi (104.92/km^{2})	347	367	−5.45%
145	Hudson	Town	Lincoln		0.282 square miles (0.73 km^{2})	1,213/sq mi (468.3/km^{2})	342	311	+9.97%
146	Florence	Town	Codington		0.693 square miles (1.79 km^{2})	487.7/sq mi (188.3/km^{2})	338	337	+0.30%
147	Wakonda	Town	Clay		0.386 square miles (1.00 km^{2})	875.6/sq mi (338.1/km^{2})	338	347	−2.59%
148	Colome	City	Tripp		0.282 square miles (0.73 km^{2})	1,195/sq mi (461.4/km^{2})	337	331	+1.81%
149	Blunt	City	Hughes		0.487 square miles (1.26 km^{2})	678/sq mi (262/km^{2})	330	342	−3.51%
150	Chancellor	Town	Turner		0.220 square miles (0.57 km^{2})	1,464/sq mi (565.1/km^{2})	322	300	+7.33%
151	Stickney	Town	Aurora		0.268 square miles (0.69 km^{2})	1,190/sq mi (459.6/km^{2})	319	321	−0.62%
152	Veblen	City	Marshall		0.314 square miles (0.81 km^{2})	997/sq mi (384.9/km^{2})	313	317	−1.26%
153	Bison	Town	Perkins		0.993 square miles (2.57 km^{2})	310.2/sq mi (119.76/km^{2})	308	302	+1.99%
154	Iroquois	City	Kingsbury	Beadle	0.621 square miles (1.61 km^{2})	473.4/sq mi (182.8/km^{2})	294	292	+0.68%
155	Kennebec	Town	Lyman		0.853 square miles (2.21 km^{2})	330.6/sq mi (127.64/km^{2})	282	281	+0.36%
156	Roscoe	City	Edmunds		0.383 square miles (0.99 km^{2})	733.7/sq mi (283.3/km^{2})	281	269	+4.46%
157	Bristol	City	Day		0.522 square miles (1.35 km^{2})	532.6/sq mi (205.6/km^{2})	278	288	−3.47%
158	Langford	Town	Marshall		0.317 square miles (0.82 km^{2})	870.7/sq mi (336.2/km^{2})	276	283	−2.47%
159	Summit	Town	Roberts		0.548 square miles (1.42 km^{2})	503.6/sq mi (194.5/km^{2})	276	288	−4.17%
160	Willow Lake	City	Clark		0.372 square miles (0.96 km^{2})	728.5/sq mi (281.3/km^{2})	271	255	+6.27%
161	Keystone	Town	Pennington		3.001 square miles (7.77 km^{2})	89.30/sq mi (34.48/km^{2})	268	240	+11.67%
162	Henry	Town	Codington		1.452 square miles (3.76 km^{2})	183.2/sq mi (70.73/km^{2})	266	256	+3.91%
163	Bonesteel	City	Gregory		0.354 square miles (0.92 km^{2})	726.0/sq mi (280.3/km^{2})	257	258	−0.39%
164	Egan	City	Moody		1.067 square miles (2.76 km^{2})	235.2/sq mi (90.83/km^{2})	251	241	+4.15%
165	Pickstown	Town	Charles Mix		0.613 square miles (1.59 km^{2})	404.6/sq mi (156.2/km^{2})	248	230	+7.83%
166	Trent	Town	Moody		1.042 square miles (2.70 km^{2})	232.2/sq mi (89.67/km^{2})	242	206	+17.48%
167	Gary	City	Deuel		0.672 square miles (1.74 km^{2})	354.2/sq mi (136.7/km^{2})	238	240	−0.83%
168	Pukwana	Town	Brule		0.767 square miles (1.99 km^{2})	310.3/sq mi (119.8/km^{2})	238	233	+2.15%
169	New Effington	Town	Roberts		0.261 square miles (0.68 km^{2})	866/sq mi (334.3/km^{2})	226	234	−3.42%
170	Pollock	Town	Campbell		0.321 square miles (0.83 km^{2})	704.0/sq mi (271.8/km^{2})	226	224	+0.89%
171	Bruce	City	Brookings		0.369 square miles (0.96 km^{2})	593.5/sq mi (229.2/km^{2})	219	210	+4.29%
172	Alpena	Town	Jerauld		1.631 square miles (4.22 km^{2})	131.8/sq mi (50.90/km^{2})	215	212	+1.42%
173	Nisland	Town	Butte		0.269 square miles (0.70 km^{2})	766/sq mi (295.7/km^{2})	206	206	0.00%
174	Tulare	Town	Spink		0.256 square miles (0.66 km^{2})	805/sq mi (310.7/km^{2})	206	211	−2.37%
175	Frederick	Town	Brown		1.354 square miles (3.51 km^{2})	151.4/sq mi (58.46/km^{2})	205	215	−4.65%
176	Wessington	City	Beadle	Hand	0.378 square miles (0.98 km^{2})	531.7/sq mi (205.3/km^{2})	201	197	+2.03%
177	Toronto	Town	Deuel		0.307 square miles (0.80 km^{2})	645.0/sq mi (249.0/km^{2})	198	196	+1.02%
178	Doland	City	Spink		0.608 square miles (1.57 km^{2})	322.4/sq mi (124.5/km^{2})	196	199	−1.51%
179	Mellette	City	Spink		0.256 square miles (0.66 km^{2})	758/sq mi (292.6/km^{2})	194	199	−2.51%
180	Hecla	City	Brown		0.344 square miles (0.89 km^{2})	552/sq mi (213/km^{2})	190	193	−1.55%
181	South Shore	Town	Codington		1.397 square miles (3.62 km^{2})	135.3/sq mi (52.24/km^{2})	189	189	0.00%
182	Mission Hill	Town	Yankton		0.328 square miles (0.85 km^{2})	570.1/sq mi (220.1/km^{2})	187	190	−1.58%
183	Roslyn	Town	Day		0.218 square miles (0.56 km^{2})	835/sq mi (322.3/km^{2})	182	181	+0.55%
184	Peever	Town	Roberts		0.124 square miles (0.32 km^{2})	1,387/sq mi (536/km^{2})	172	180	−4.44%
185	Wentworth	Village	Lake		0.254 square miles (0.66 km^{2})	677/sq mi (261.5/km^{2})	172	181	−4.97%
186	Kranzburg	Town	Codington		0.764 square miles (1.98 km^{2})	217.3/sq mi (83.89/km^{2})	166	163	+1.84%
187	Monroe	Town	Turner		0.379 square miles (0.98 km^{2})	432.7/sq mi (167.1/km^{2})	164	159	+3.14%
188	Ramona	Town	Lake		0.274 square miles (0.71 km^{2})	594.9/sq mi (229.7/km^{2})	163	159	+2.52%
189	Isabel	Town	Dewey		0.845 square miles (2.19 km^{2})	191.7/sq mi (74.02/km^{2})	162	145	+11.72%
190	St. Lawrence	Town	Hand		0.343 square miles (0.89 km^{2})	472.3/sq mi (182.4/km^{2})	162	163	−0.61%
191	Dimock	Town	Hutchinson		0.172 square miles (0.45 km^{2})	924/sq mi (356.9/km^{2})	159	137	+16.06%
192	Letcher	Town	Sanborn		0.616 square miles (1.60 km^{2})	256.5/sq mi (99.0/km^{2})	158	159	−0.63%
193	Hosmer	City	Edmunds		0.989 square miles (2.56 km^{2})	158.7/sq mi (61.29/km^{2})	157	164	−4.27%
194	Volin	Town	Yankton		0.197 square miles (0.51 km^{2})	797/sq mi (307.7/km^{2})	157	158	−0.63%
195	Buffalo Gap	Town	Custer		0.306 square miles (0.79 km^{2})	506.5/sq mi (195.6/km^{2})	155	131	+18.32%
196	Columbia	City	Brown		1.517 square miles (3.93 km^{2})	102.2/sq mi (39.45/km^{2})	155	160	−3.12%
197	Delmont	City	Douglas		0.763 square miles (1.98 km^{2})	201.8/sq mi (77.93/km^{2})	154	153	+0.65%
198	Goodwin	Town	Deuel		0.474 square miles (1.23 km^{2})	324.9/sq mi (125.4/km^{2})	154	147	+4.76%
199	Geddes	City	Charles Mix		0.727 square miles (1.88 km^{2})	206/sq mi (79.7/km^{2})	150	156	−3.85%
200	Conde	City	Spink		0.563 square miles (1.46 km^{2})	246.9/sq mi (95.3/km^{2})	139	142	−2.11%
201	Spencer	City	McCook		0.268 square miles (0.69 km^{2})	518.7/sq mi (200.3/km^{2})	139	136	+2.21%
202	Badger	Town	Kingsbury		1.061 square miles (2.75 km^{2})	129.1/sq mi (49.85/km^{2})	137	129	+6.20%
203	Northville	Town	Spink		0.376 square miles (0.97 km^{2})	359.0/sq mi (138.6/km^{2})	135	139	−2.88%
204	Artesian	Town	Sanborn		0.554 square miles (1.43 km^{2})	240.1/sq mi (92.7/km^{2})	133	129	+3.10%
205	Frankfort	City	Spink		0.788 square miles (2.04 km^{2})	167.5/sq mi (64.68/km^{2})	132	134	−1.49%
206	Astoria	Town	Deuel		0.157 square miles (0.41 km^{2})	834/sq mi (322.2/km^{2})	131	132	−0.76%
207	Cavour	Town	Beadle		0.410 square miles (1.06 km^{2})	319.5/sq mi (123.4/km^{2})	131	128	+2.34%
208	Carthage	City	Miner		1.460 square miles (3.78 km^{2})	87.0/sq mi (33.59/km^{2})	127	127	0.00%
209	Oelrichs	Town	Fall River		0.365 square miles (0.95 km^{2})	347.9/sq mi (134.3/km^{2})	127	117	+8.55%
210	Reliance	Town	Lyman		1.086 square miles (2.81 km^{2})	116.9/sq mi (45.15/km^{2})	127	128	−0.78%
211	Pierpont	Town	Day		0.152 square miles (0.39 km^{2})	822/sq mi (317.5/km^{2})	125	129	−3.10%
212	Oldham	City	Kingsbury		0.246 square miles (0.64 km^{2})	491.9/sq mi (189.9/km^{2})	121	121	0.00%
213	Brandt	Town	Deuel		1.263 square miles (3.27 km^{2})	94.2/sq mi (36.38/km^{2})	119	114	+4.39%
214	Java	Town	Walworth		0.492 square miles (1.27 km^{2})	241.9/sq mi (93.4/km^{2})	119	121	−1.65%
215	Central City	City	Lawrence		0.155 square miles (0.40 km^{2})	723/sq mi (279.0/km^{2})	112	93	+20.43%
216	Hitchcock	Town	Beadle		0.273 square miles (0.71 km^{2})	406.6/sq mi (157.0/km^{2})	111	112	−0.89%
217	Lesterville	Town	Yankton		0.202 square miles (0.52 km^{2})	545/sq mi (210/km^{2})	110	115	−4.35%
218	McIntosh	City	Corson		0.730 square miles (1.89 km^{2})	149.3/sq mi (57.65/km^{2})	109	111	−1.80%
219	Claremont	Town	Brown		0.251 square miles (0.65 km^{2})	426.3/sq mi (164.6/km^{2})	107	108	−0.93%
220	Yale	Town	Beadle		0.145 square miles (0.38 km^{2})	738/sq mi (284.9/km^{2})	107	112	−4.46%
221	Glenham	Town	Walworth		0.327 square miles (0.85 km^{2})	324.2/sq mi (125.2/km^{2})	106	112	−5.36%
222	Hazel	Town	Hamlin		0.242 square miles (0.63 km^{2})	433.9/sq mi (167.5/km^{2})	105	102	+2.94%
223	Midland	Town	Haakon		0.344 square miles (0.89 km^{2})	305.2/sq mi (117.9/km^{2})	105	112	−6.25%
224	Ashton	City	Spink		0.438 square miles (1.13 km^{2})	237.4/sq mi (91.7/km^{2})	104	108	−3.70%
225	Cresbard	Town	Faulk		0.415 square miles (1.07 km^{2})	250.6/sq mi (96.8/km^{2})	104	96	+8.33%
226	Pringle	Town	Custer		0.242 square miles (0.63 km^{2})	429.8/sq mi (165.9/km^{2})	104	109	−4.59%
227	Sinai	Town	Brookings		0.370 square miles (0.96 km^{2})	275.7/sq mi (106.4/km^{2})	102	99	+3.03%
228	Stockholm	Town	Grant		0.433 square miles (1.12 km^{2})	235.6/sq mi (91.0/km^{2})	102	102	0.00%
229	Fairfax	Town	Gregory		0.303 square miles (0.78 km^{2})	330/sq mi (130/km^{2})	100	96	+4.17%
230	Harrold	Town	Hughes		0.412 square miles (1.07 km^{2})	233.0/sq mi (90.0/km^{2})	96	101	−4.95%
231	Revillo	Town	Grant		0.167 square miles (0.43 km^{2})	575/sq mi (222.0/km^{2})	96	99	−3.03%
232	Wallace	Town	Codington		0.133 square miles (0.34 km^{2})	714/sq mi (275.8/km^{2})	95	91	+4.40%
233	Canova	Town	Miner		0.314 square miles (0.81 km^{2})	293.0/sq mi (113.1/km^{2})	92	89	+3.37%
234	Eden	Town	Marshall		0.154 square miles (0.40 km^{2})	591/sq mi (228.2/km^{2})	91	94	−3.19%
235	Brentford	Town	Spink		0.163 square miles (0.42 km^{2})	528/sq mi (203.7/km^{2})	86	88	−2.27%
236	Fulton	Town	Hanson		0.854 square miles (2.21 km^{2})	99.5/sq mi (38.43/km^{2})	85	87	−2.30%
237	Dallas	Town	Gregory		0.507 square miles (1.31 km^{2})	163.7/sq mi (63.2/km^{2})	83	89	−6.74%
238	Akaska	Town	Walworth		0.611 square miles (1.58 km^{2})	132.6/sq mi (51.2/km^{2})	81	77	+5.19%
239	Claire City	Town	Roberts		0.183 square miles (0.47 km^{2})	443/sq mi (170.9/km^{2})	81	82	−1.22%
240	Westport	Town	Brown		0.235 square miles (0.61 km^{2})	344.7/sq mi (133.1/km^{2})	81	88	−7.95%
241	Fruitdale	Town	Butte		0.274 square miles (0.71 km^{2})	292/sq mi (113/km^{2})	80	73	+9.59%
242	Herrick	Town	Gregory		0.515 square miles (1.33 km^{2})	149.5/sq mi (57.7/km^{2})	77	74	+4.05%
243	Sherman	Town	Minnehaha		0.257 square miles (0.67 km^{2})	299.6/sq mi (115.7/km^{2})	77	81	−4.94%
244	Bushnell	Town	Brookings		0.713 square miles (1.85 km^{2})	106.6/sq mi (41.16/km^{2})	76	71	+7.04%
245	Batesland	Town	Oglala Lakota		0.090 square miles (0.23 km^{2})	811/sq mi (313/km^{2})	73	100	−27.00%
246	Corona	Town	Roberts		0.253 square miles (0.66 km^{2})	284.6/sq mi (109.9/km^{2})	72	69	+4.35%
247	Agar	Town	Sully		0.205 square miles (0.53 km^{2})	346/sq mi (133.7/km^{2})	71	68	+4.41%
248	Andover	Town	Day		0.270 square miles (0.70 km^{2})	263.0/sq mi (101.5/km^{2})	71	66	+7.58%
249	Dante	Town	Charles Mix		0.500 square miles (1.29 km^{2})	142.0/sq mi (54.8/km^{2})	71	75	−5.33%
250	Ravinia	Town	Charles Mix		0.249 square miles (0.64 km^{2})	285.1/sq mi (110.1/km^{2})	71	71	0.00%
251	Bradley	Town	Clark		0.245 square miles (0.63 km^{2})	281.6/sq mi (108.7/km^{2})	69	65	+6.15%
252	Camp Crook	Town	Harding		0.139 square miles (0.36 km^{2})	496/sq mi (191.7/km^{2})	69	60	+15.00%
253	Fairburn	Town	Custer		0.327 square miles (0.85 km^{2})	211.0/sq mi (81.5/km^{2})	69	60	+15.00%
254	Utica	Town	Yankton		0.264 square miles (0.68 km^{2})	261.4/sq mi (100.9/km^{2})	69	70	−1.43%
255	Mound City	Town	Campbell		0.127 square miles (0.33 km^{2})	512/sq mi (197.6/km^{2})	65	69	−5.80%
256	Strandburg	Town	Grant		0.075 square miles (0.19 km^{2})	867/sq mi (335/km^{2})	65	63	+3.17%
257	Fairview	Town	Lincoln		0.085 square miles (0.22 km^{2})	741/sq mi (286/km^{2})	63	61	+3.28%
258	Interior	Town	Jackson		1.339 square miles (3.47 km^{2})	47.1/sq mi (18.17/km^{2})	63	65	−3.08%
259	La Bolt	Town	Grant		0.238 square miles (0.62 km^{2})	260.5/sq mi (100.6/km^{2})	62	66	−6.06%
260	Olivet	Town	Hutchinson		0.141 square miles (0.37 km^{2})	440/sq mi (169.8/km^{2})	62	64	−3.12%
261	Quinn	Town	Pennington		1.200 square miles (3.11 km^{2})	50.8/sq mi (19.63/km^{2})	61	63	−3.17%
262	Wasta	Town	Pennington		0.192 square miles (0.50 km^{2})	313/sq mi (121/km^{2})	60	65	−7.69%
263	Ree Heights	Town	Hand		0.296 square miles (0.77 km^{2})	199.3/sq mi (77.0/km^{2})	59	59	0.00%
264	Stratford	Town	Brown		0.250 square miles (0.65 km^{2})	232.0/sq mi (89.6/km^{2})	58	57	+1.75%
265	Davis	Town	Turner		0.430 square miles (1.11 km^{2})	132.6/sq mi (51.2/km^{2})	57	54	+5.56%
266	Raymond	Town	Clark		0.262 square miles (0.68 km^{2})	217.6/sq mi (84.0/km^{2})	57	53	+7.55%
267	Brant Lake	City	Lake		0.155 square miles (0.40 km^{2})	361/sq mi (139.5/km^{2})	56	56	0.00%
268	New Witten	Town	Tripp		0.277 square miles (0.72 km^{2})	198.6/sq mi (76.7/km^{2})	55	54	+1.85%
269	Ortley	Town	Roberts		2.244 square miles (5.81 km^{2})	24.51/sq mi (9.46/km^{2})	55	50	+10.00%
270	Orient	Town	Faulk		0.294 square miles (0.76 km^{2})	183.7/sq mi (70.9/km^{2})	54	51	+5.88%
271	Turton	Town	Spink		0.367 square miles (0.95 km^{2})	147.1/sq mi (56.8/km^{2})	54	55	−1.82%
272	Vienna	Town	Clark		0.842 square miles (2.18 km^{2})	64.1/sq mi (24.76/km^{2})	54	49	+10.20%
273	Lane	Town	Jerauld		0.465 square miles (1.20 km^{2})	111.8/sq mi (43.2/km^{2})	52	47	+10.64%
274	Grenville	Town	Day		0.237 square miles (0.61 km^{2})	202.5/sq mi (78.2/km^{2})	48	48	0.00%
275	Wood	Town	Mellette		0.246 square miles (0.64 km^{2})	195.1/sq mi (75.3/km^{2})	48	41	+17.07%
276	Twin Brooks	Town	Grant		0.406 square miles (1.05 km^{2})	115.8/sq mi (44.7/km^{2})	47	47	0.00%
277	Nunda	Town	Lake		1.008 square miles (2.61 km^{2})	45.6/sq mi (17.62/km^{2})	46	46	0.00%
278	Draper	Town	Jones		0.650 square miles (1.68 km^{2})	67.7/sq mi (26.1/km^{2})	44	46	−4.35%
279	Lake City	Town	Marshall		0.219 square miles (0.57 km^{2})	200.9/sq mi (77.6/km^{2})	44	45	−2.22%
280	Morristown	Town	Corson		0.351 square miles (0.91 km^{2})	122.5/sq mi (47.3/km^{2})	43	47	−8.51%
281	Ward	Town	Moody		0.291 square miles (0.75 km^{2})	144.3/sq mi (55.7/km^{2})	42	34	+23.53%
282	Erwin	Town	Kingsbury		0.476 square miles (1.23 km^{2})	86.1/sq mi (33.3/km^{2})	41	40	+2.50%
283	Naples	Town	Clark		0.139 square miles (0.36 km^{2})	295/sq mi (113.9/km^{2})	41	38	+7.89%
284	Belvidere	Town	Jackson		0.760 square miles (1.97 km^{2})	53/sq mi (20.3/km^{2})	40	46	−13.04%
285	Dolton	Town	Turner		0.256 square miles (0.66 km^{2})	152.3/sq mi (58.8/km^{2})	39	34	+14.71%
286	Tolstoy	Town	Potter		0.183 square miles (0.47 km^{2})	208/sq mi (80.2/km^{2})	38	35	+8.57%
287	Altamont	Town	Deuel		1.254 square miles (3.25 km^{2})	28.7/sq mi (11.08/km^{2})	36	32	+12.50%
288	Garden City	Town	Clark		0.395 square miles (1.02 km^{2})	91.1/sq mi (35.2/km^{2})	36	33	+9.09%
289	Lebanon	Town	Potter		0.530 square miles (1.37 km^{2})	60.4/sq mi (23.3/km^{2})	32	33	−3.03%
290	Broadland	Town	Beadle		1.007 square miles (2.61 km^{2})	26.8/sq mi (10.35/km^{2})	27	27	0.00%
291	Long Lake	Town	McPherson		0.277 square miles (0.72 km^{2})	97.5/sq mi (37.6/km^{2})	27	27	0.00%
292	Virgil	Town	Beadle		1.000 square mile (2.59 km^{2})	25.0/sq mi (9.65/km^{2})	25	16	+56.25%
293	Seneca	Town	Faulk		0.419 square miles (1.09 km^{2})	57.3/sq mi (22.1/km^{2})	24	22	+9.09%
294	Vilas	Town	Miner		2.978 square miles (7.71 km^{2})	7.72/sq mi (2.98/km^{2})	23	29	−20.69%
295	Hetland	Town	Kingsbury		0.114 square miles (0.30 km^{2})	180/sq mi (68/km^{2})	20	20	0.00%
296	Rockham	Town	Faulk		0.498 square miles (1.29 km^{2})	40/sq mi (16/km^{2})	20	22	−9.09%
297	Chelsea	Town	Faulk		0.317 square miles (0.82 km^{2})	59.9/sq mi (23.1/km^{2})	19	19	0.00%
298	Marvin	Town	Grant		0.547 square miles (1.42 km^{2})	34.7/sq mi (13.4/km^{2})	19	19	0.00%
299	Farmer	Town	Hanson		0.083 square miles (0.21 km^{2})	193/sq mi (74.4/km^{2})	16	15	+6.67%
300	Onaka	Town	Faulk		0.259 square miles (0.67 km^{2})	54.1/sq mi (20.9/km^{2})	14	13	+7.69%
301	Wetonka	Town	McPherson		0.246 square miles (0.64 km^{2})	56.9/sq mi (22.0/km^{2})	14	16	−12.50%
302	Bancroft	Town	Kingsbury		0.233 square miles (0.60 km^{2})	55.8/sq mi (21.5/km^{2})	13	13	0.00%
303	Artas	Town	Campbell		0.104 square miles (0.27 km^{2})	100/sq mi (37/km^{2})	10	7	+42.86%
304	Cottonwood	Town	Jackson		0.918 square miles (2.38 km^{2})	9.8/sq mi (3.79/km^{2})	9	12	−25.00%
305	Albee	Town	Grant		0.131 square miles (0.34 km^{2})	61/sq mi (23.6/km^{2})	8	7	+14.29%
306	White Rock	Town	Roberts		1.571 square miles (4.07 km^{2})	4.5/sq mi (1.72/km^{2})	7	6	+16.67%
307	Verdon	Town	Brown		0.252 square miles (0.65 km^{2})	23.8/sq mi (9.2/km^{2})	6	3	+100.00%
308	Lowry	Town	Walworth		0.253 square miles (0.66 km^{2})	19.8/sq mi (7.6/km^{2})	5	10	−50.00%
309	Butler	Town	Day		0.291 square miles (0.75 km^{2})	13.7/sq mi (5.3/km^{2})	4	4	0.00%
310	Hillsview	Town	McPherson		0.637 square miles (1.65 km^{2})	1.6/sq mi (0.61/km^{2})	1	2	−50.00%
Total					75,809.288 square miles (196,345.15 km^{2})	12.334821/sq mi (4.7625010/km^{2})	935,094	886,667	+5.46%

== Images ==
Notable incorporated cities in South Dakota

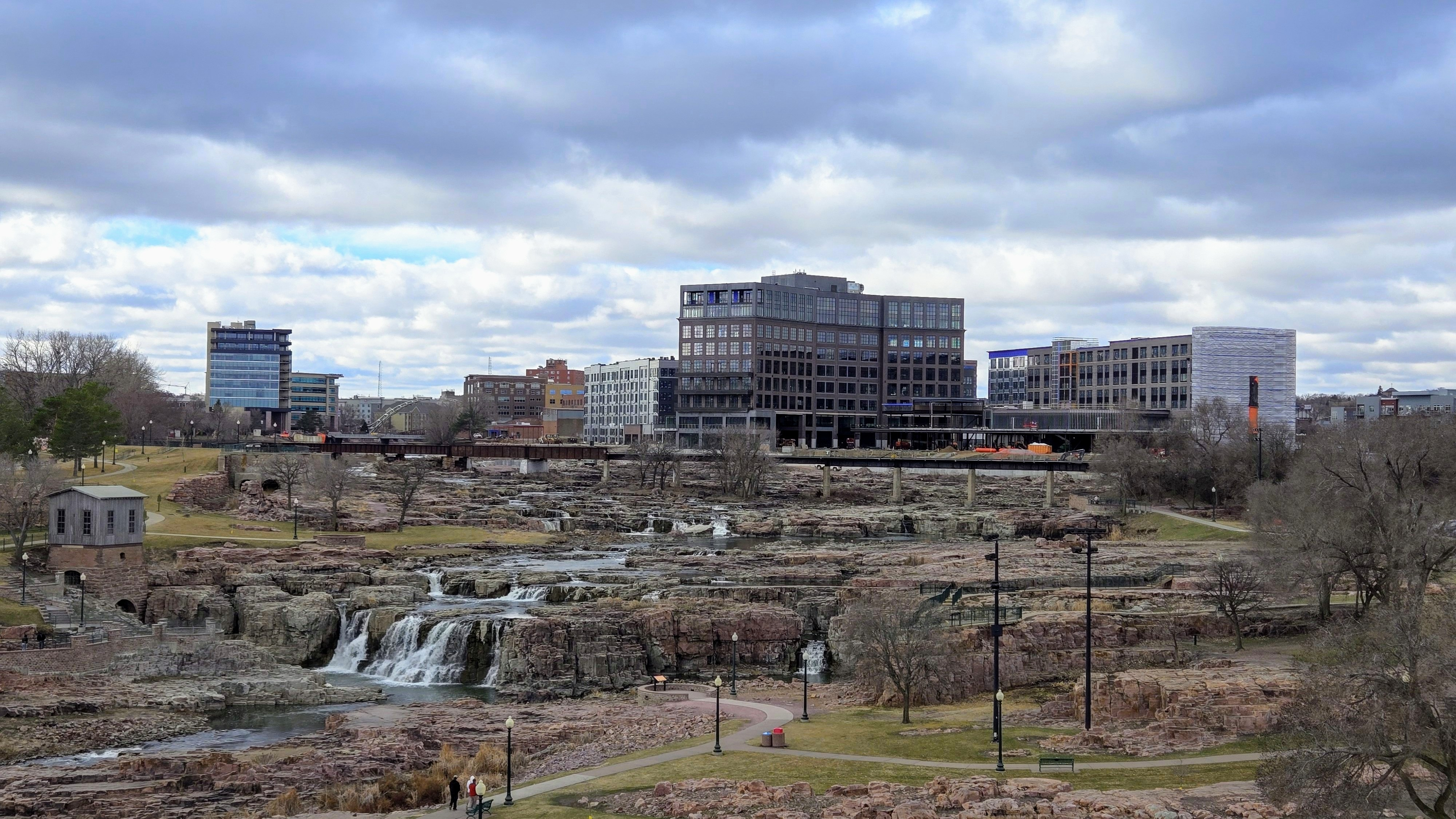
Sioux Falls, most populous city in South Dakota

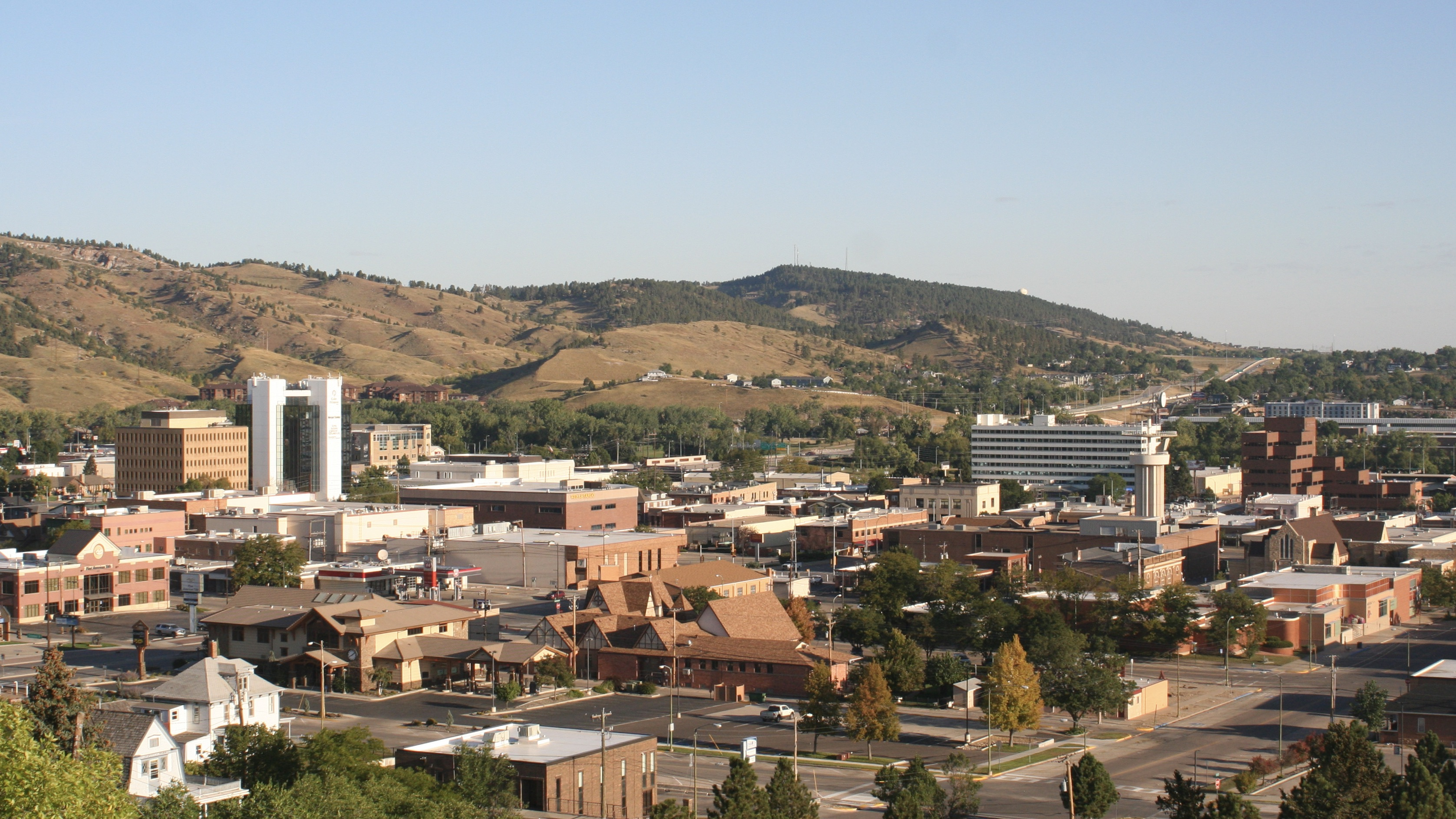
Rapid City, the second most populous city

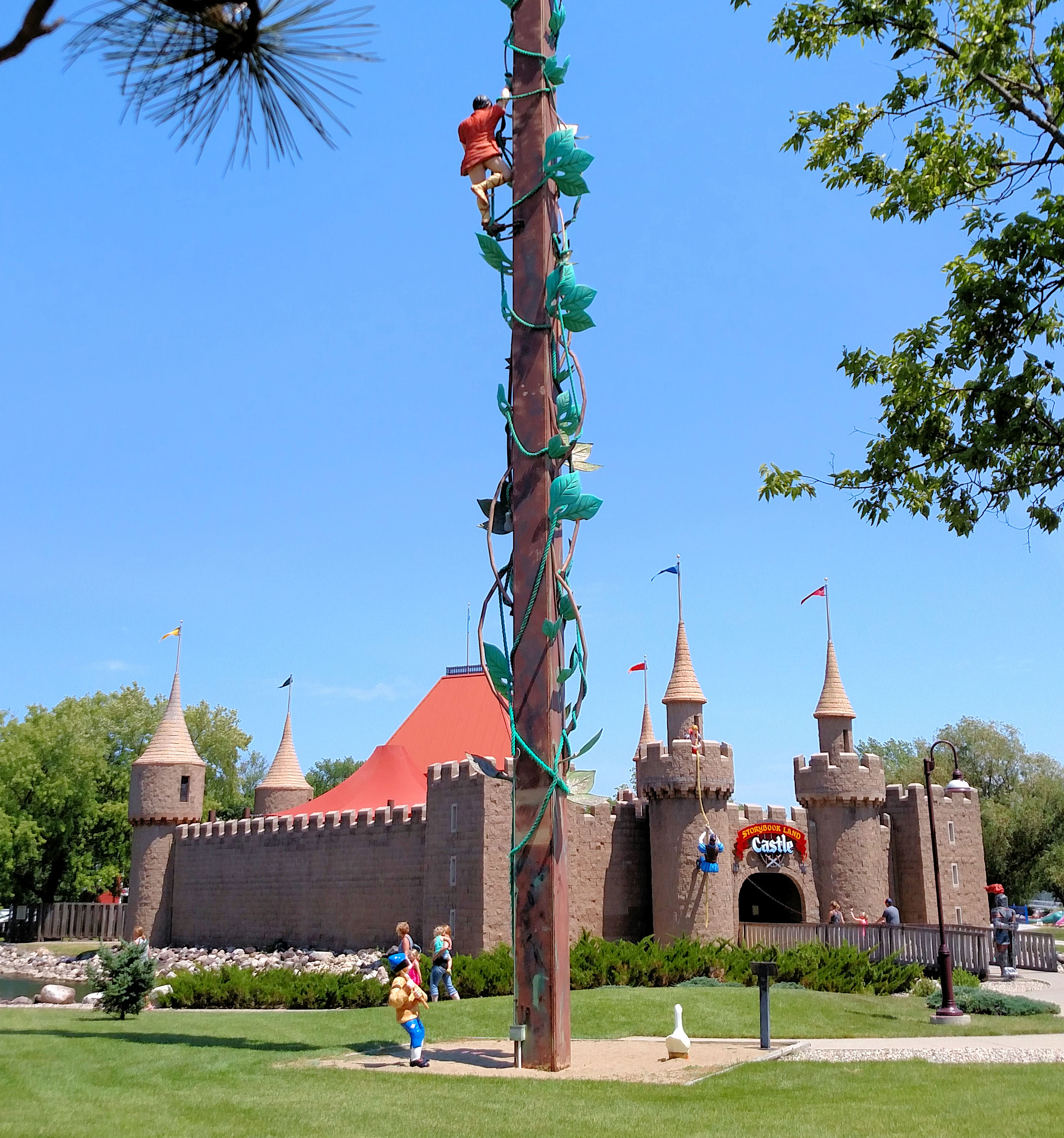
Aberdeen, the third most populous city

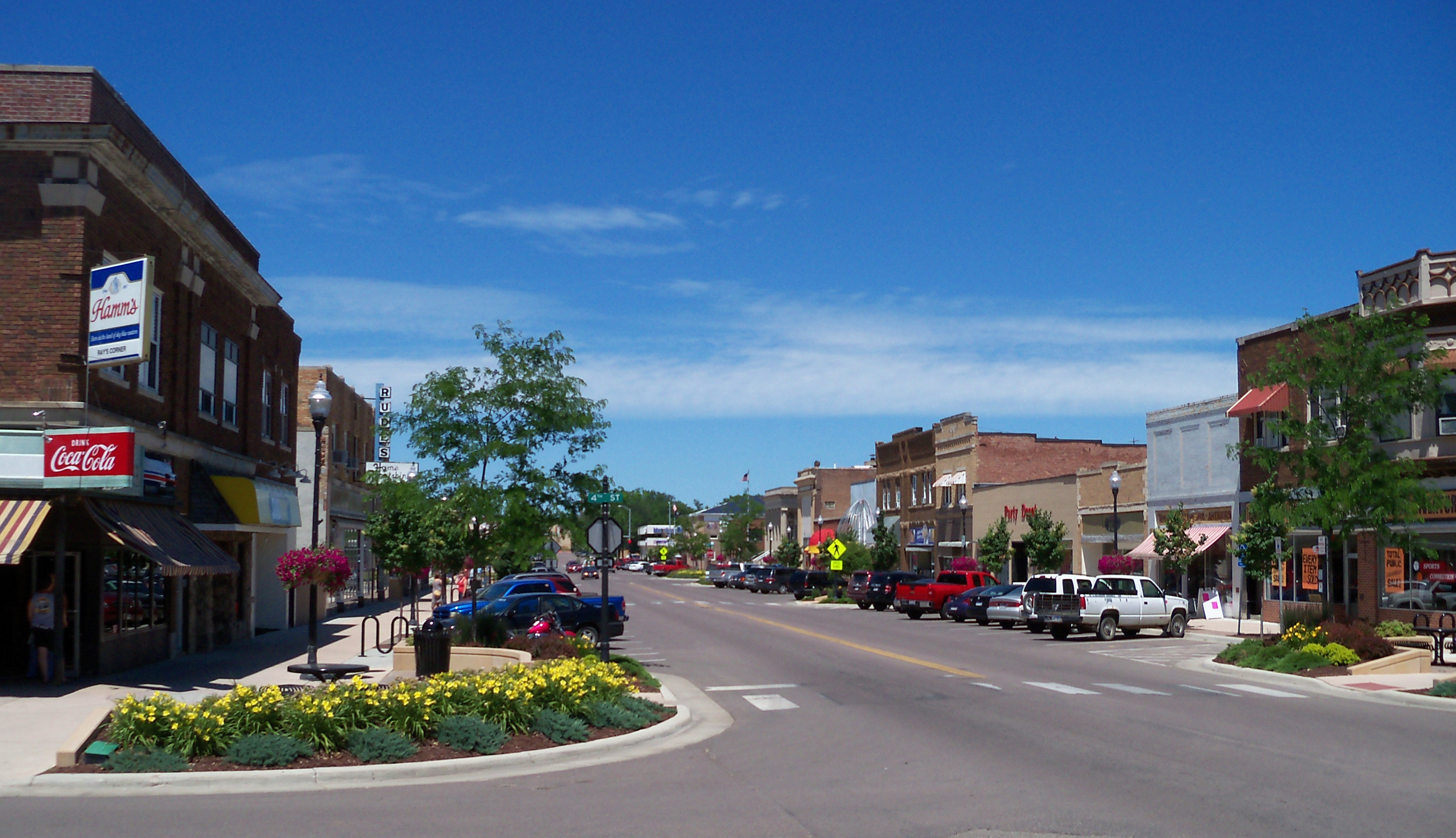
Brookings, the fourth most populous city

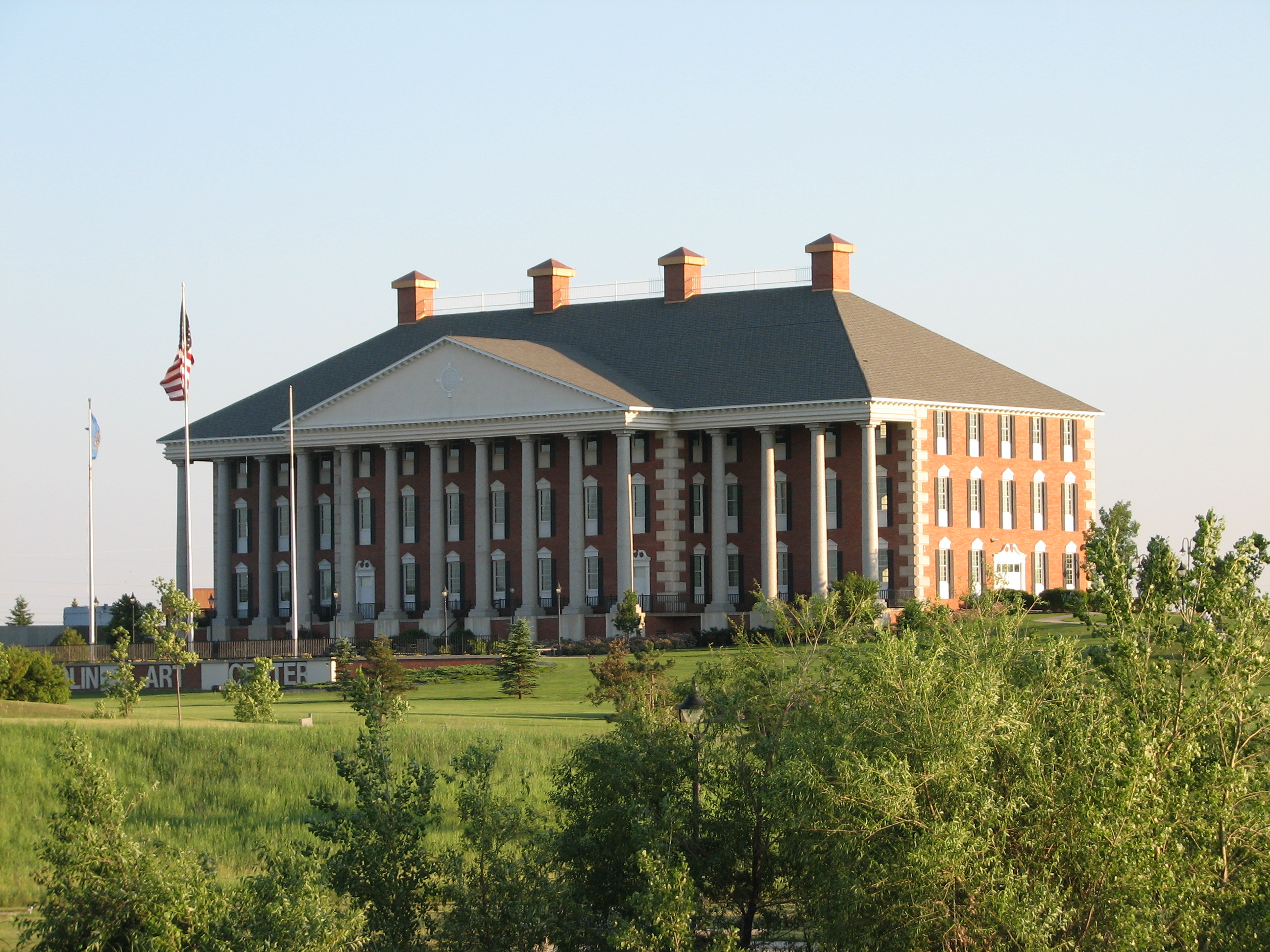
Watertown, the fifth most populous city

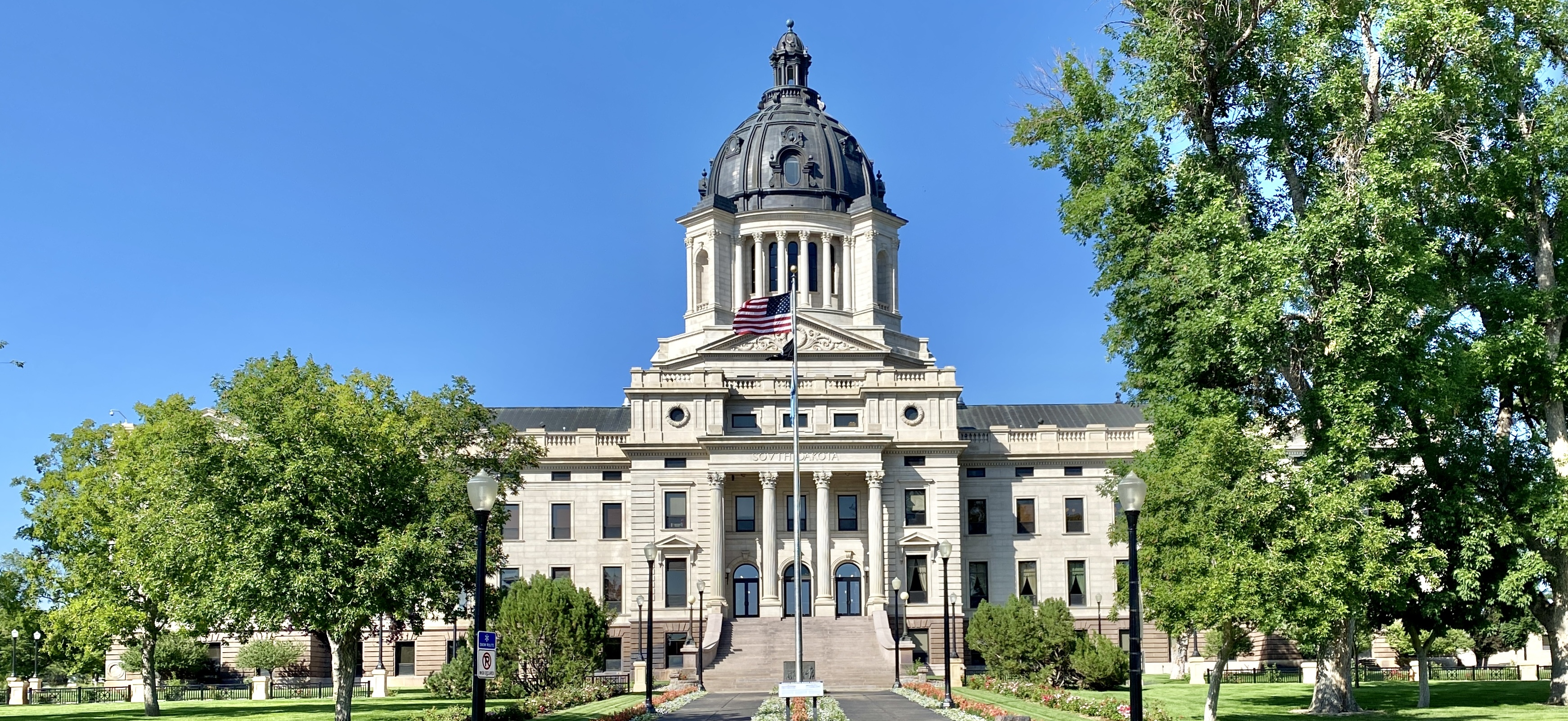
Pierre, the capital of South Dakota

== See also ==
- List of townships in South Dakota
- List of census-designated places in South Dakota
