= Hillside Colony, South Dakota =

- Census-designated place
- Location within South Dakota Location within the United States
- Coordinates: 44°44′18″N 98°02′50″W
- Country: United States
- State: South Dakota
- County: Spink

Area
  - Total: 0.29 sq mi (0.75 km^{2})
  - Land: 0.29 sq mi (0.75 km^{2})
  - Water: 0 sq mi (0.00 km^{2})
- Elevation: 1,381 ft (421 m)

Population (2020)
  - Total: 123
  - Density: 426.2/sq mi (164.54/km^{2})
- Time zone: UTC-6 (Central (CST))
  - Summer (DST): UTC-5 (CDT)
- ZIP Code: 57436 (Doland)
- Area code: 605
- FIPS code: 46-29300
- GNIS feature ID: 2813061

Hillside Colony is a census-designated place (CDP) and Hutterite colony in Spink County, South Dakota, United States. It was first listed as a CDP prior to the 2020 census. The population of the CDP was 123 at the 2020 census.

It is in the southeast part of the county, bordered to the southeast by Foster Creek, a southwest-flowing tributary of the James River. It is 13 miles (21 km) by road south-southeast of Doland and 24 miles (39 km) southeast of Frankfort.

== Demographics ==
Historical population
Census	Pop.	Note	%±
2020	123		—
U.S. Decennial Census
