= Clark Colony, South Dakota =

- Census-designated place
- Location within South Dakota Location within the United States
- Coordinates: 44°47′29″N 97°58′53″W
- Country: United States
- State: South Dakota
- County: Spink

Area
  - Total: 0.25 sq mi (0.66 km^{2})
  - Land: 0.25 sq mi (0.66 km^{2})
  - Water: 0 sq mi (0.00 km^{2})
- Elevation: 1,421 ft (433 m)

Population (2020)
  - Total: 92
  - Density: 363.2/sq mi (140.23/km^{2})
- Time zone: UTC-6 (Central (CST))
  - Summer (DST): UTC-5 (CDT)
- ZIP Code: 57258 (Raymond)
- Area code: 605
- FIPS code: 46-12340
- GNIS feature ID: 2813059

Clark Colony is a census-designated place (CDP) and Hutterite colony in Spink County, South Dakota, United States. It was first listed as a CDP prior to the 2020 census. The population of the CDP was 92 at the 2020 census.

It is in the southeast part of the county, bordered to the east by the Clark County line. It is 13 miles (21 km) by road southeast of Doland and 10 miles (16 km) south-southwest of Raymond.

== Demographics ==
Historical population
Census	Pop.	Note	%±
2020	92		—
U.S. Decennial Census
