= Glendale Colony, South Dakota =

- Census-designated place
- Location within South Dakota Location within the United States
- Coordinates: 44°47′53″N 98°17′13″W
- Country: United States
- State: South Dakota
- County: Spink

Area
  - Total: 0.48 sq mi (1.24 km^{2})
  - Land: 0.48 sq mi (1.24 km^{2})
  - Water: 0 sq mi (0.00 km^{2})
- Elevation: 1,293 ft (394 m)

Population (2020)
  - Total: 176
  - Density: 368/sq mi (141.9/km^{2})
- Time zone: UTC-6 (Central (CST))
  - Summer (DST): UTC-5 (CDT)
- ZIP Code: 57440 (Frankfort)
- Area code: 605
- FIPS code: 46-24540
- GNIS feature ID: 2813062

Glendale Colony is a census-designated place (CDP) and Hutterite colony in Spink County, South Dakota, United States. It was first listed as a CDP prior to the 2020 census. The population of the CDP was 176 at the 2020 census.

It is in the southern part of the county, on the east side of the James River. It is 7 miles (11 km) by road south of Frankfort and 17 miles (27 km) southeast of Redfield, the county seat.

== Demographics ==
Historical population
Census	Pop.	Note	%±
2020	176		—
U.S. Decennial Census
