= Old Spink Colony =

- U.S. National Register of Historic Places
- Location within South Dakota Location within the United States
- Nearest city: Frankfort, South Dakota
- Coordinates: 44°44′49″N 98°17′35″W
- Area: 1.8 acres (0.73 ha)
- Built: 1914
- MPS: Historic Hutterite Colonies TR
- NRHP reference No.: 82003941
- Added to NRHP: June 30, 1982

The Old Spink Colony is a Hutterite colony on the James River near Frankfort, South Dakota. It was listed on the National Register of Historic Places in 1982. The colony was founded by Russian German immigrants from what is now Ukraine. The listing included four contributing buildings.

As of 1981, it was one of 23 extinct colonies in South Dakota out of 46 colonies which had been established up until then.

It includes the South Dwelling, which has a 1906 date upon it, the East Dwelling, a Dining Hall, and a Carpenter/Welding Shop.

It is included in Spink Colony, South Dakota, a census-designated place.
