= Camrose Colony, South Dakota =

- Census-designated place
- Location within South Dakota Location within the United States
- Coordinates: 44°56′03″N 98°13′13″W
- Country: United States
- State: South Dakota
- County: Spink

Area
  - Total: 0.36 sq mi (0.93 km^{2})
  - Land: 0.36 sq mi (0.93 km^{2})
  - Water: 0 sq mi (0.00 km^{2})
- Elevation: 1,293 ft (394 m)

Population (2020)
  - Total: 76
  - Density: 211.9/sq mi (81.82/km^{2})
- Time zone: UTC-6 (Central (CST))
  - Summer (DST): UTC-5 (CDT)
- ZIP Code: 57440 (Frankfort)
- Area code: 605
- FIPS code: 46-09278
- GNIS feature ID: 2813063

Camrose Colony is a census-designated place (CDP) and Hutterite colony in Spink County, South Dakota, United States. It was first listed as a CDP prior to the 2020 census. The CDP had a population of 76 at the 2020 census.

It is in the east-central part of the county, bordered to the east by Timber Creek, a south-flowing tributary of the James River. It is 7 miles (11 km) by road northeast of Frankfort and 9 miles (14 km) northwest of Doland.

== Demographics ==
Historical population
| Census | Pop. | Note | %± |
|---|---|---|---|
| 2020 | 76 | | — |
U.S. Decennial Census
