= Spink Colony, South Dakota =

- Census-designated place
- Location within South Dakota Location within the United States
- Coordinates: 44°44′42″N 98°17′22″W
- Country: United States
- State: South Dakota
- County: Spink

Area
  - Total: 0.38 sq mi (0.98 km^{2})
  - Land: 0.36 sq mi (0.92 km^{2})
  - Water: 0.023 sq mi (0.06 km^{2})
- Elevation: 1,260 ft (380 m)

Population (2020)
  - Total: 135
  - Density: 380.2/sq mi (146.81/km^{2})
- Time zone: UTC-6 (Central (CST))
  - Summer (DST): UTC-5 (CDT)
- ZIP Code: 57440 (Frankfort)
- Area code: 605
- FIPS code: 46-60180
- GNIS feature ID: 2813060

Spink Colony is a census-designated place (CDP) and Hutterite colony in Spink County, South Dakota, United States. It was first listed as a CDP before the 2020 census. The population of the CDP was 135 at the 2020 Census.

It is in the southern part of the county, on the east side of the James River. It is 9 miles (14 km) south of Frankfort and 20 miles (32 km) by road southeast of Redfield, the county seat.

The Old Spink Colony, part of the CDP, was listed on the National Register of Historic Places in 1982.

== Demographics ==
Historical population
Census	Pop.	Note	%±
2020	135		—
U.S. Decennial Census
