= Deacon Phillippe =

American baseball player (1872–1952)

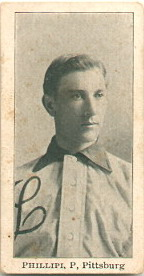
- Pitcher
- Born: May 23, 1872; Rural Retreat, Virginia, U.S.
- Died: March 30, 1952 (aged 79); Avalon, Pennsylvania, U.S.
- Batted: Right Threw: Right

MLB debut
- April 21, 1899, for the Louisville Colonels

Last MLB appearance
- August 13, 1911, for the Pittsburgh Pirates

MLB statistics
- Win–loss record: 189–109
- Earned run average: 2.59
- Strikeouts: 929
- Stats at Baseball Reference

Teams
- Louisville Colonels (1899); Pittsburgh Pirates (1900–1911)

Career highlights and awards
- World Series champion (1909); 4× NL champion (1901, 1902, 1903, 1909); Pitched a no-hitter on May 25, 1899

Charles Louis "Deacon" Phillippe (originally Phillippi) (May 23, 1872 – March 30, 1952) was an American Major League Baseball pitcher who played for the Louisville Colonels and the Pittsburgh Pirates.

== Biography ==
Born in Rural Retreat, Virginia to Andrew Phillippe and Jane Margaret Hackler, Phillipe was one of eight children (two brothers and five sisters). When he was three, his family moved to the Dakota Territory near the town of Athol, located in what is now the state of South Dakota, where he would play semi-pro ball for many years.

=== Louisville Colonels ===
Phillippe first appeared in pro baseball with the National League's Louisville Colonels in 1899. He had a 21–17 record that year, which was highlighted by a no-hitter in his seventh career game. While the Colonels disbanded after the season, owner Barney Dreyfuss moved a number of Louisville players, including Phillippe, to the Pirates, another team Dreyfuss co-owned.

=== Pittsburgh Pirates ===
Phillippe won 20 games for four straight seasons as the Pirates won three straight National League pennants from 1901 to 1903. In 1900, he pitched for the Pirates in Game 3 of the Chronicle-Telegraph Cup series to determine the National League champion between the Pirates and the Brooklyn Superbas. Pittsburgh avoided the series sweep as Phillippe threw a six-hit shutout and the Pirates' bats added 10 runs. The Pirates lost the series 3 games to 1.

In 1903, Phillippe earned the honor of starting the first World Series game for the Pirates against the Boston Americans in 1903. In a complete game victory, Phillippe struck out 10 batters and earned the win against Cy Young to start the best-of-nine series. He single-handedly guided the Pirates to a 3–1 series lead, earning the wins in each game, but when his arm wore down due to overuse, the Americans came back to win the series 5 games to 3, with Phillippe losing the last two. His five decisions in the World Series are still a record for a pitcher. To show their appreciation, Pirates' fans presented him with a diamond horseshoe stickpin and team owner Barney Dreyfuss rewarded him ten shares of stock in the club.

Phillippe missed half of the 1904 season due to a sore arm, before winning 20 games for the sixth time in 1905. However his years as an ace ended in 1908, when he suffered from another sore arm and missed nearly the entire season. Phillippe returned in 1909 to play a bit role on a Pirate team which went 110–42, en route to their first World Series title. In 1910, he was primarily used as a relief pitcher and had a 14–2 record. He retired after the 1911 season after making only three appearances that year.

=== Pittsburgh Filipinos ===
In 1912, he managed the Pittsburgh Filipinos, which were named after him, and began play in the United States Baseball League. The Filipinos finished in first place during the league's inaugural season, which lasted only one month, with a 19–7 record. The team then moved to the new Federal League in 1913 and, for a short time, was later renamed the Pittsburgh Stogies.

=== Legacy ===
Phillippe was widely renowned for his control. No pitcher who has debuted since 1893 (when the pitching mound was moved to its present distance of 60 feet and 6 inches away from home plate) has averaged fewer walks per nine innings than Phillippe.

Deacon is a distant relative of actor Ryan Phillippe, who named his first son Deacon (born in 2003) in honor of the pitcher.

The spring that supplies Rural Retreat, Virginia with water is called Phillippe Springs, after the pitcher.

Phillippe was inducted into the Virginia Sports Hall of Fame in 1982.

== See also ==
- List of Major League Baseball no-hitters

Achievements
Preceded by Walter Thornton	No-hitter pitcher May 25, 1899	Succeeded by Vic Willis
