= Camrose Colony =

Camrose Colony may refer to:

- Camrose Colony, Montana
- Camrose Colony, South Dakota
