= Ashton, South Dakota =

- City
- Location in Spink County and the state of South Dakota
- Coordinates: 44°59′35″N 98°29′57″W
- Country: United States
- State: South Dakota
- County: Spink
- Incorporated: 1883

Area
  - Total: 0.44 sq mi (1.13 km^{2})
  - Land: 0.44 sq mi (1.13 km^{2})
  - Water: 0 sq mi (0.00 km^{2})
- Elevation: 1,293 ft (394 m)

Population (2020)
  - Total: 108
  - Density: 246.5/sq mi (95.19/km^{2})
- Time zone: UTC-6 (Central (CST))
  - Summer (DST): UTC-5 (CDT)
- ZIP code: 57424
- Area code: 605
- FIPS code: 46-02540
- GNIS feature ID: 1267271

Ashton is a city in Spink County, South Dakota, United States. The population was 108 at the 2020 census.

== History ==
Ashton was founded in 1879, but it was moved and replatted on the current site in 1881 in order to be located on a new railroad line. The town most likely takes its name after Ashton, England. A post office called Ashton has been in operation since 1879.

== Geography ==
According to the United States Census Bureau, the city has a total area of 0.44 square miles (1.14 km^{2}), all land.

== Demographics ==
Historical population
Census	Pop.	Note	%±
1890	359		—
1900	274		−23.7%
1910	430		56.9%
1920	372		−13.5%
1930	314		−15.6%
1940	240		−23.6%
1950	222		−7.5%
1960	182		−18.0%
1970	137		−24.7%
1980	154		12.4%
1990	148		−3.9%
2000	152		2.7%
2010	122		−19.7%
2020	108		−11.5%
U.S. Decennial Census

=== 2020 census ===
As of the 2020 census, Ashton had a population of 108. The median age was 46.0 years. 25.0% of residents were under the age of 18 and 19.4% of residents were 65 years of age or older. For every 100 females there were 111.8 males, and for every 100 females age 18 and over there were 92.9 males age 18 and over.

0.0% of residents lived in urban areas, while 100.0% lived in rural areas.

There were 40 households in Ashton, of which 27.5% had children under the age of 18 living in them. Of all households, 65.0% were married-couple households, 25.0% were households with a male householder and no spouse or partner present, and 7.5% were households with a female householder and no spouse or partner present. About 22.5% of all households were made up of individuals and 15.0% had someone living alone who was 65 years of age or older.

There were 48 housing units, of which 16.7% were vacant. The homeowner vacancy rate was 5.6% and the rental vacancy rate was 0.0%.

Racial composition as of the 2020 census
Race	Number	Percent
White	102	94.4%
Black or African American	0	0.0%
American Indian and Alaska Native	1	0.9%
Asian	0	0.0%
Native Hawaiian and Other Pacific Islander	0	0.0%
Some other race	2	1.9%
Two or more races	3	2.8%
Hispanic or Latino (of any race)	3	2.8%

=== 2010 census ===
As of the census of 2010, there were 122 people, 52 households, and 37 families residing in the city. The population density was 277.3 inhabitants per square mile (107.1/km^{2}). There were 64 housing units at an average density of 145.5 per square mile (56.2/km^{2}). The racial makeup of the city was 100.0% White. Hispanic or Latino of any race were 4.9% of the population.

There were 52 households, of which 32.7% had children under the age of 18 living with them, 53.8% were married couples living together, 13.5% had a female householder with no husband present, 3.8% had a male householder with no wife present, and 28.8% were non-families. 28.8% of all households were made up of individuals, and 11.6% had someone living alone who was 65 years of age or older. The average household size was 2.35 and the average family size was 2.84.

The median age in the city was 43.7 years. 24.6% of residents were under the age of 18; 5.7% were between the ages of 18 and 24; 22.1% were from 25 to 44; 32.8% were from 45 to 64; and 14.8% were 65 years of age or older. The gender makeup of the city was 54.9% male and 45.1% female.

=== 2000 census ===
As of the census of 2000, there were 152 people, 61 households, and 45 families residing in the city. The population density was 342.4 inhabitants per square mile (132.2/km^{2}). There were 72 housing units at an average density of 162.2 per square mile (62.6/km^{2}). The racial makeup of the city was 100.00% White.

There were 61 households, out of which 29.5% had children under the age of 18 living with them, 59.0% were married couples living together, 11.5% had a female householder with no husband present, and 26.2% were non-families. 21.3% of all households were made up of individuals, and 9.8% had someone living alone who was 65 years of age or older. The average household size was 2.49 and the average family size was 2.91.

In the city, the population was spread out, with 30.3% under the age of 18, 2.0% from 18 to 24, 25.7% from 25 to 44, 25.0% from 45 to 64, and 17.1% who were 65 years of age or older. The median age was 39 years. For every 100 females, there were 100.0 males. For every 100 females age 18 and over, there were 96.3 males.

The median income for a household in the city was $25,625, and the median income for a family was $36,875. Males had a median income of $21,719 versus $20,179 for females. The per capita income for the city was $12,283. There were 5.4% of families and 6.3% of the population living below the poverty line, including 6.4% of under eighteens and none of those over 64.

== See also ==
- List of cities in South Dakota
