= Hillsview, South Dakota =

- Town
- Location in McPherson County and the state of South Dakota
- Coordinates: 45°39′51″N 99°33′38″W
- Country: United States
- State: South Dakota
- County: McPherson
- Founded: 1887

Area
  - Total: 0.64 sq mi (1.67 km^{2})
  - Land: 0.64 sq mi (1.65 km^{2})
  - Water: 0.0077 sq mi (0.02 km^{2})
- Elevation: 1,850 ft (560 m)

Population (2020)
  - Total: 2
  - Density: 3.1/sq mi (1.21/km^{2})
- Time zone: UTC-6 (Central (CST))
  - Summer (DST): UTC-5 (CDT)
- ZIP code: 57437
- Area code: 605
- FIPS code: 46-29340
- GNIS feature ID: 1267424

Hillsview is a ghost town in McPherson County, South Dakota, United States. The population was 2 at the 2020 census. Hillsview is the least-populated municipality in South Dakota. As of 2023, the population is 0 and is scheduled to be unincorporated.

The town was named because of its lofty elevation.

== Geography ==
According to the United States Census Bureau, the town has a total area of 0.65 square miles (1.68 km^{2}), of which 0.64 square miles (1.66 km^{2}) is land and 0.01 square miles (0.03 km^{2}) is water.

== Demographics ==
Historical population
Census	Pop.	Note	%±
1930	101		—
1940	160		58.4%
1950	68		−57.5%
1960	44		−35.3%
1970	19		−56.8%
1980	9		−52.6%
1990	4		−55.6%
2000	3		−25.0%
2010	3		0.0%
2020	2		−33.3%
U.S. Decennial Census; 2013 Estimate

=== 2010 census ===
As of the census of 2010, there were 3 people, 1 household, and 1 family residing in the town. The population density was 4.7 inhabitants per square mile (1.8/km^{2}). There were 2 housing units at an average density of 3.1 units per square mile (1.2 units/km^{2}). The racial makeup of the town was 100.0% White.

There was 1 household of which 100.0% was married couples living together. 0.0% of all households were made up of individuals. The average household size was 3.00 and the average family size was 3.00.

The median age in the town was 53.5 years. 0.0% of residents were under the age of 18; 33.3% were between the ages of 18 and 24; 0.0% were from 25 to 44; 66.7% were from 45 to 64; and 0.0% were 65 years of age or older. The gender makeup of the town was 33.3% female and 66.7% male.

=== 2000 census ===
As of the census of 2000, there were 3 people, 1 household, and 1 family residing in the town. The population density was 4.7 people per square mile (1.8 people/km^{2}). There were 2 housing units at an average density of 3.1 units per square mile (1.2 units/km^{2}). The racial makeup of the town was 100% White.

There was 1 household, a married couple living together. The household size was 3 and the family size was 3.

In the town, the population was spread out, with 33.3% from 25 to 44, 33.3% from 45 to 64, and 33.3% who were 65 years of age or older. The median age was 64 years. There were 2 men and 1 woman.

== Government ==
Since the 1990s, James Imberi had been the Mayor of Hillsview. After his death on November 6, 2016, his wife Helen was appointed to the position.
