= Hitchcock, South Dakota =

- Town
- Location in Beadle County and the state of South Dakota
- Coordinates: 44°37′46″N 98°24′30″W
- Country: United States
- State: South Dakota
- County: Beadle

Area
  - Total: 0.27 sq mi (0.71 km^{2})
  - Land: 0.27 sq mi (0.71 km^{2})
  - Water: 0 sq mi (0.00 km^{2})
- Elevation: 1,339 ft (408 m)

Population (2020)
  - Total: 112
  - Density: 410.3/sq mi (158.41/km^{2})
- Time zone: UTC-6 (Central (CST))
  - Summer (DST): UTC-5 (CDT)
- ZIP code: 57348
- Area code: 605
- FIPS code: 46-29500
- GNIS feature ID: 1267425
- Website: www.hitchcocksouthdakota.com

Hitchcock is a town in Beadle County, South Dakota, United States. The population was 112 at the 2020 census.

Hitchcock co-ops with the nearby town of Tulare for sports, making them the Hitchcock/Tulare Patriots.

== History ==
Hitchcock was platted in 1881. Early variant names were Clarkville and Altoona. The present name honors Charles S. Hitchcock, an original owner of the town site. A post office has been in operation in Hitchcock since 1881.

== Geography ==
According to the United States Census Bureau, the town has a total area of 0.27 square miles (0.70 km^{2}), all land.

== Demographics ==
Historical population
Census	Pop.	Note	%±
1900	135		—
1910	259		91.9%
1920	358		38.2%
1930	334		−6.7%
1940	246		−26.3%
1950	227		−7.7%
1960	193		−15.0%
1970	150		−22.3%
1980	132		−12.0%
1990	95		−28.0%
2000	108		13.7%
2010	91		−15.7%
2020	112		23.1%
U.S. Decennial Census

=== 2010 census ===
As of the census of 2010, there were 91 people, 43 households, and 30 families residing in the town. The population density was 337.0 inhabitants per square mile (130.1/km^{2}). There were 58 housing units at an average density of 214.8 per square mile (82.9/km^{2}). The racial makeup of the town was 93.4% White, 1.1% African American, 1.1% Native American, 1.1% Asian, and 3.3% from two or more races. Hispanic or Latino of any race were 1.1% of the population.

There were 43 households, of which 20.9% had children under the age of 18 living with them, 55.8% were married couples living together, 7.0% had a female householder with no husband present, 7.0% had a male householder with no wife present, and 30.2% were non-families. 30.2% of all households were made up of individuals, and 2.3% had someone living alone who was 65 years of age or older. The average household size was 2.12 and the average family size was 2.57.

The median age in the town was 47.5 years. 22% of residents were under the age of 18; 2.2% were between the ages of 18 and 24; 19.8% were from 25 to 44; 38.5% were from 45 to 64; and 17.6% were 65 years of age or older. The gender makeup of the town was 58.2% male and 41.8% female.

=== 2000 census ===
As of the census of 2000, there were 108 people, 52 households, and 31 families residing in the town. The population density was 404.3 inhabitants per square mile (156.1/km^{2}). There were 61 housing units at an average density of 228.3 per square mile (88.1/km^{2}). The racial makeup of the town was 99.07% White, and 0.93% from two or more races.

There were 52 households, out of which 17.3% had children under the age of 18 living with them, 53.8% were married couples living together, 3.8% had a female householder with no husband present, and 38.5% were non-families. 34.6% of all households were made up of individuals, and 15.4% had someone living alone who was 65 years of age or older. The average household size was 2.08 and the average family size was 2.69.

In the town, the population was spread out, with 18.5% under the age of 18, 7.4% from 18 to 24, 19.4% from 25 to 44, 33.3% from 45 to 64, and 21.3% who were 65 years of age or older. The median age was 47 years. For every 100 females, there were 116.0 males. For every 100 females age 18 and over, there were 109.5 males.

The median income for a household in the town was $30,000, and the median income for a family was $44,167. Males had a median income of $21,667 versus $13,750 for females. The per capita income for the town was $17,640. There were 9.4% of families and 12.7% of the population living below the poverty line, including 26.7% of under eighteens and 24.0% of those over 64.

== See also ==
- List of cities in South Dakota
