= Athol, South Dakota =

Athol
- Unincorporated community
- Athol
- Coordinates: 45°00′32″N 98°35′47″W
- Country: United States
- State: South Dakota
- County: Spink
- Elevation: 1,296 ft (395 m)
- GNIS feature ID: 1265610

Athol is an unincorporated community in Spink County, South Dakota, United States. It is part of Athol Township.

== History ==
Athol was originally named Myrtle City for Myrtle Taylor, the child of a first settler. The community was renamed in 1881 when the Chicago and North Western Railroad came through the area. The town was named for Athol, Massachusetts, which was named for James Murray, second Duke of Atholl, Scotland. Athol received a US Post Office on September 28, 1881. R. G. Bestor published the Athol Star newspaper for a time beginning in the 1880s.

On February 23, 1903, one man was killed and thirteen people injured in a Chicago and North Western Railroad accident near town.

== Geography ==
Athol lies near the south fork of Snake Creek.
