= Northville, South Dakota =

- Town
- Location in Spink County and the state of South Dakota
- Coordinates: 45°09′19″N 98°34′46″W
- Country: United States
- State: South Dakota
- County: Spink
- Incorporated: 1909

Area
  - Total: 0.37 sq mi (0.97 km^{2})
  - Land: 0.37 sq mi (0.97 km^{2})
  - Water: 0 sq mi (0.00 km^{2})
- Elevation: 1,299 ft (396 m)

Population (2020)
  - Total: 139
  - Density: 370.0/sq mi (142.85/km^{2})
- Time zone: UTC-6 (Central (CST))
  - Summer (DST): UTC-5 (CDT)
- ZIP code: 57465
- Area code: 605
- FIPS code: 46-45740
- GNIS feature ID: 1267513

Northville is a town in Spink County, South Dakota, United States. The population was 139 at the 2020 census.

== History ==
Northville was platted in 1881 when the railroad was extended to that point. The city was named from the fact it was then the most northern point on the railroad line. A post office has been in operation in Northville since 1881. United States Senator and founding Dean of the University of South Dakota School of Law Thomas Sterling was a resident of Northville from 1882 until 1886.

== Geography ==
According to the United States Census Bureau, the town has a total area of 0.38 square miles (0.98 km^{2}), all land.

== Demographics ==
Historical population
Census	Pop.	Note	%±
1900	243		—
1910	392		61.3%
1920	372		−5.1%
1930	260		−30.1%
1940	223		−14.2%
1950	220		−1.3%
1960	153		−30.5%
1970	119		−22.2%
1980	138		16.0%
1990	105		−23.9%
2000	124		18.1%
2010	143		15.3%
2020	139		−2.8%
U.S. Decennial Census

=== 2010 census ===
As of the census of 2010, there were 143 people, 52 households, and 37 families residing in the town. The population density was 376.3 inhabitants per square mile (145.3/km^{2}). There were 61 housing units at an average density of 160.5 per square mile (62.0/km^{2}). The racial makeup of the town was 97.2% White, 2.1% Native American, and 0.7% from two or more races. Hispanic or Latino of any race were 0.7% of the population.

There were 52 households, of which 34.6% had children under the age of 18 living with them, 67.3% were married couples living together, 1.9% had a female householder with no husband present, 1.9% had a male householder with no wife present, and 28.8% were non-families. 25.0% of all households were made up of individuals, and 5.7% had someone living alone who was 65 years of age or older. The average household size was 2.75 and the average family size was 3.38.

The median age in the town was 31.8 years. 36.4% of residents were under the age of 18; 2.1% were between the ages of 18 and 24; 30.1% were from 25 to 44; 21.7% were from 45 to 64; and 9.8% were 65 years of age or older. The gender makeup of the town was 44.8% male and 55.2% female.

=== 2000 census ===
As of the census of 2000, there were 124 people, 47 households, and 33 families residing in the town. The population density was 324.5 inhabitants per square mile (125.3/km^{2}). There were 51 housing units at an average density of 133.5 per square mile (51.5/km^{2}). The racial makeup of the town was 99.19% White and 0.81% Native American. Hispanic or Latino of any race were 4.03% of the population.

There were 47 households, out of which 40.4% had children under the age of 18 living with them, 68.1% were married couples living together, 2.1% had a female householder with no husband present, and 27.7% were non-families. 23.4% of all households were made up of individuals, and 12.8% had someone living alone who was 65 years of age or older. The average household size was 2.64 and the average family size was 3.21.

In the town, the population was spread out, with 33.1% under the age of 18, 2.4% from 18 to 24, 25.8% from 25 to 44, 20.2% from 45 to 64, and 18.5% who were 65 years of age or older. The median age was 37 years. For every 100 females, there were 103.3 males. For every 100 females age 18 and over, there were 102.4 males.

The median income for a household in the town was $38,250, and the median income for a family was $41,250. Males had a median income of $23,750 versus $21,875 for females. The per capita income for the town was $14,140. There were 6.7% of families and 9.1% of the population living below the poverty line, including 7.8% of under eighteens and 16.7% of those over 64.
