= Raymond, South Dakota =

- Town
- Location in Clark County and the state of South Dakota
- Coordinates: 44°54′38″N 97°56′14″W
- Country: United States
- State: South Dakota
- County: Clark
- Incorporated: 1909

Area
  - Total: 0.26 sq mi (0.68 km^{2})
  - Land: 0.26 sq mi (0.68 km^{2})
  - Water: 0 sq mi (0.00 km^{2})
- Elevation: 1,460 ft (450 m)

Population (2020)
  - Total: 53
  - Density: 202.4/sq mi (78.16/km^{2})
- Time zone: UTC-6 (Central (CST))
  - Summer (DST): UTC-5 (CDT)
- ZIP code: 57258
- Area code: 605
- FIPS code: 46-53260
- GNIS feature ID: 1267546

Raymond is a town in western Clark County, South Dakota, United States. The population was 53 at the 2020 census.

== History ==
The post office at Raymond has been in operation since 1882. Raymond was platted in 1883. The town was named for J. M. Raymond, a railroad engineer.

== Geography ==
According to the United States Census Bureau, the town has a total area of 0.26 square miles (0.67 km^{2}), all land.

== Demographics ==
Historical population
Census	Pop.	Note	%±
1910	241		—
1920	330		36.9%
1930	200		−39.4%
1940	206		3.0%
1950	174		−15.5%
1960	168		−3.4%
1970	114		−32.1%
1980	106		−7.0%
1990	96		−9.4%
2000	86		−10.4%
2010	50		−41.9%
2020	53		6.0%
U.S. Decennial Census

=== 2010 census ===
As of the census of 2010, there were 50 people, 27 households, and 15 families residing in the town. The population density was 192.3 inhabitants per square mile (74.2/km^{2}). There were 38 housing units at an average density of 146.2 per square mile (56.4/km^{2}). The racial makeup of the town was 98.0% White and 2.0% African American. Hispanic or Latino of any race were 2.0% of the population.

There were 27 households, of which 7.4% had children under the age of 18 living with them, 40.7% were married couples living together, 7.4% had a female householder with no husband present, 7.4% had a male householder with no wife present, and 44.4% were non-families. 44.4% of all households were made up of individuals, and 33.3% had someone living alone who was 65 years of age or older. The average household size was 1.85 and the average family size was 2.40.

The median age in the town was 58.7 years. 4% of residents were under the age of 18; 4% were between the ages of 18 and 24; 24% were from 25 to 44; 32% were from 45 to 64; and 36% were 65 years of age or older. The gender makeup of the town was 50.0% male and 50.0% female.

=== 2000 census ===
As of the census of 2000, there were 86 people, 37 households, and 23 families residing in the town. The population density was 328.2 inhabitants per square mile (126.7/km^{2}). There were 39 housing units at an average density of 148.8 per square mile (57.5/km^{2}). The racial makeup of the town was 96.51% White, 3.49% from other races. Hispanic or Latino of any race were 4.65% of the population.

There were 37 households, out of which 32.4% had children under the age of 18 living with them, 51.4% were married couples living together, 5.4% had a female householder with no husband present, and 37.8% were non-families. 35.1% of all households were made up of individuals, and 18.9% had someone living alone who was 65 years of age or older. The average household size was 2.32 and the average family size was 3.09.

In the town, the population was spread out, with 29.1% under the age of 18, 1.2% from 18 to 24, 27.9% from 25 to 44, 17.4% from 45 to 64, and 24.4% who were 65 years of age or older. The median age was 38 years. For every 100 females, there were 104.8 males. For every 100 females age 18 and over, there were 110.3 males.

The median income for a household in the town was $33,750, and the median income for a family was $36,250. Males had a median income of $20,833 versus $15,625 for females. The per capita income for the town was $14,660. There were 13.6% of families and 17.3% of the population living below the poverty line, including 20.8% of under eighteens and 26.7% of those over 64.

== Education ==
Logan Consolidated Schools was located 1 mile (1.6 km) east and 3 miles (4.8 km) south of Raymond on the Carpenter road. The rural school housed the kindergarten through senior classes. The athletic teams had the mascot of the Arrows. The school was closed in 1962 and the high school enrollment that year consisted of 12 students.

The Raymond school mascot was the Redwings and operated into the 1970s.

== See also ==
- List of towns in South Dakota
