= Naples, South Dakota =

- Town
- Location in Clark County and the state of South Dakota
- Coordinates: 44°46′18″N 97°30′47″W
- Country: United States
- State: South Dakota
- County: Clark
- Incorporated: 1924

Area
  - Total: 0.14 sq mi (0.36 km^{2})
  - Land: 0.14 sq mi (0.36 km^{2})
  - Water: 0 sq mi (0.00 km^{2})
- Elevation: 1,788 ft (545 m)

Population (2020)
  - Total: 38
  - Density: 273.0/sq mi (105.41/km^{2})
- Time zone: UTC-6 (Central (CST))
  - Summer (DST): UTC-5 (CDT)
- ZIP Code: 57271
- Area code: 605
- FIPS code: 46-44620
- GNIS ID: 1267489

Naples is a town in Clark County, South Dakota, United States. The population was 38 at the 2020 census. A post office operated in Naples from 1888 to 1971.

The town takes its name from Naples, Italy.

== Geography ==
According to the United States Census Bureau, the town has a total area of 0.14 square miles (0.36 km^{2}), all land.

== Demographics ==
Historical population
Census	Pop.	Note	%±
1930	89		—
1940	84		−5.6%
1950	62		−26.2%
1960	36		−41.9%
1970	38		5.6%
1980	45		18.4%
1990	35		−22.2%
2000	25		−28.6%
2010	41		64.0%
2020	38		−7.3%
U.S. Decennial Census

=== 2010 ===
As of the 2010 Census, there were 41 people, 12 households, and 10 families residing in the town. The population density was 292.9 inhabitants per square mile (113.1/km^{2}). There were 12 housing units at an average density of 85.7 per square mile (33.1/km^{2}). The racial makeup of the town was 90.2% White and 9.8% African American.

There were 12 households, of which 50.0% had children under the age of 18 living with them, 75.0% were married couples living together, 8.3% had a male householder with no wife present, and 16.7% were non-families. 8.3% of all households were made up of individuals. The average household size was 3.42 and the average family size was 3.50.

The median age in the town was 28.8 years. 39% of residents were under the age of 18; 7.3% were between the ages of 18 and 24; 17.1% were from 25 to 44; 26.8% were from 45 to 64; and 9.8% were 65 years of age or older. The gender makeup of the town was 58.5% male and 41.5% female.

=== 2000 ===
As of the 2000 Census, there were 25 people, 11 households, and 6 families residing in the town. The population density was 182.1 inhabitants per square mile (70.3/km^{2}). There were 14 housing units at an average density of 102.0 per square mile (39.4/km^{2}). The racial makeup of the town was 100.00% White.

There were 11 households, out of which 27.3% had children under the age of 18 living with them, 63.6% were married couples living together, and 36.4% were non-families. 36.4% of all households were made up of individuals, and 18.2% had someone living alone who was 65 years of age or older. The average household size was 2.27 and the average family size was 3.00.

In the town, the population was spread out, with 16.0% under the age of 18, 16.0% from 18 to 24, 16.0% from 25 to 44, 32.0% from 45 to 64, and 20.0% who were 65 years of age or older. The median age was 46 years. For every 100 females, there were 127.3 males. For every 100 females age 18 and over, there were 133.3 males.

The median income for a household in the town was $37,083, and the median income for a family was $40,625. Males had a median income of $31,875 versus $11,667 for females. The per capita income for the town was $78,450. There were no families and 6.3% of the population living below the poverty line, including no under eighteens and 50.0% of those over 64.
