= Brentford, South Dakota =

- Town
- Location in Spink County and the state of South Dakota
- Coordinates: 45°09′33″N 98°19′21″W
- Country: United States
- State: South Dakota
- County: Spink
- Incorporated: 1906

Area
  - Total: 0.16 sq mi (0.42 km^{2})
  - Land: 0.16 sq mi (0.42 km^{2})
  - Water: 0 sq mi (0.00 km^{2})
- Elevation: 1,299 ft (396 m)

Population (2020)
  - Total: 88
  - Density: 540.0/sq mi (208.49/km^{2})
- Time zone: UTC-6 (Central (CST))
  - Summer (DST): UTC-5 (CDT)
- ZIP code: 57429
- Area code: 605
- FIPS code: 46-07060
- GNIS feature ID: 1267294

Brentford is a town in Spink County, South Dakota, United States. The population was 88 at the 2020 census.

== History ==
The town took its name after Brentford, in England, the native home of a railroad official.

== Geography ==
According to the United States Census Bureau, the town has a total area of 0.16 square miles (0.41 km^{2}), all land.

== Demographics ==
Historical population
Census	Pop.	Note	%±
1920	132		—
1930	174		31.8%
1940	161		−7.5%
1950	132		−18.0%
1960	96		−27.3%
1970	94		−2.1%
1980	91		−3.2%
1990	69		−24.2%
2000	65		−5.8%
2010	77		18.5%
2020	88		14.3%
U.S. Decennial Census

=== 2010 census ===
As of the census of 2010, there were 77 people, 30 households, and 19 families residing in the town. The population density was 481.3 inhabitants per square mile (185.8/km^{2}). There were 33 housing units at an average density of 206.3 per square mile (79.7/km^{2}). The racial makeup of the town was 98.7% White and 1.3% from two or more races.

There were 30 households, of which 30.0% had children under the age of 18 living with them, 53.3% were married couples living together, 10.0% had a female householder with no husband present, and 36.7% were non-families. 23.3% of all households were made up of individuals, and 6.7% had someone living alone who was 65 years of age or older. The average household size was 2.57 and the average family size was 3.00.

The median age in the town was 29.5 years. 27.3% of residents were under the age of 18; 10.4% were between the ages of 18 and 24; 24.7% were from 25 to 44; 26% were from 45 to 64; and 11.7% were 65 years of age or older. The gender makeup of the town was 42.9% male and 57.1% female.

=== 2000 census ===
As of the census of 2000, there were 65 people, 28 households, and 18 families residing in the town. The population density was 393.4 inhabitants per square mile (151.9/km^{2}). There were 29 housing units at an average density of 175.5 per square mile (67.8/km^{2}). The racial makeup of the town was 98.46% White and 1.54% Native American.

There were 28 households, out of which 35.7% had children under the age of 18 living with them, 57.1% were married couples living together, 3.6% had a female householder with no husband present, and 35.7% were non-families. 25.0% of all households were made up of individuals, and 7.1% had someone living alone who was 65 years of age or older. The average household size was 2.32 and the average family size was 2.83.

In the town, the population was spread out, with 26.2% under the age of 18, 7.7% from 18 to 24, 27.7% from 25 to 44, 24.6% from 45 to 64, and 13.8% who were 65 years of age or older. The median age was 36 years. For every 100 females, there were 124.1 males. For every 100 females age 18 and over, there were 108.7 males.

The median income for a household in the town was $55,625, and the median income for a family was $64,375. Males had a median income of $37,500 versus $50,625 for females. The per capita income for the town was $21,921. There were no families and 11.3% of the population living below the poverty line, including no under eighteens and none of those over 64.
