= Virgil, South Dakota =

- Town
- Location in Beadle County and the state of South Dakota
- Coordinates: 44°17′27″N 98°25′39″W
- Country: United States
- State: South Dakota
- County: Beadle
- Incorporated: 1916

Area
  - Total: 1.00 sq mi (2.59 km^{2})
  - Land: 1.00 sq mi (2.59 km^{2})
  - Water: 0 sq mi (0.00 km^{2})
- Elevation: 1,335 ft (407 m)

Population (2020)
  - Total: 26
  - Density: 26.0/sq mi (10.04/km^{2})
- Time zone: UTC-6 (Central (CST))
  - Summer (DST): UTC-5 (CDT)
- ZIP code: 57379
- Area code: 605
- FIPS code: 46-67500
- GNIS feature ID: 1267617

Virgil is a town in Beadle County in the U.S. state of South Dakota. The population was 26 at the 2020 census.

== History ==
Virgil got its start in the early 1880s when the railroad was extended to that point. The town was named for the Ancient Roman poet Virgil.

== Geography ==
According to the United States Census Bureau, the town has a total area of 1.00 square mile (2.59 km^{2}), all land.

== Demographics ==
Historical population
Census	Pop.	Note	%±
1920	189		—
1930	166		−12.2%
1940	145		−12.7%
1950	124		−14.5%
1960	81		−34.7%
1970	43		−46.9%
1980	37		−14.0%
1990	33		−10.8%
2000	25		−24.2%
2010	16		−36.0%
2020	26		62.5%
U.S. Decennial Census

=== 2010 census ===
As of the census of 2010, there were 16 people, 9 households, and 5 families residing in the town. The population density was 16.0 inhabitants per square mile (6.2/km^{2}). There were 14 housing units at an average density of 14.0 per square mile (5.4/km^{2}). The racial makeup of the town was 100.0% White.

There were 9 households, of which 11.1% had children under the age of 18 living with them, 55.6% were married couples living together, and 44.4% were non-families. 44.4% of all households were made up of individuals. The average household size was 1.78 and the average family size was 2.40.

The median age in the town was 52.5 years. 12.5% of residents were under the age of 18; 0.1% were between the ages of 18 and 24; 31.3% were from 25 to 44; 31.3% were from 45 to 64; and 25% were 65 years of age or older. The gender makeup of the town was 56.3% male and 43.8% female.

=== 2000 census ===
As of the census of 2000, there were 25 people, 13 households, and 7 families residing in the town. The population density was 25.0 people per square mile (9.7/km^{2}). There were 15 housing units at an average density of 15.0 per square mile (5.8/km^{2}). The racial makeup of the town was 100.00% White.

There were 13 households, out of which 23.1% had children under the age of 18 living with them, 53.8% were married couples living together, 7.7% had a female householder with no husband present, and 38.5% were non-families. 38.5% of all households were made up of individuals, and 15.4% had someone living alone who was 65 years of age or older. The average household size was 1.92 and the average family size was 2.50.

The town's population was distributed in the following way: 12.0% under the age of 18, 4.0% from 18 to 24, 36.0% from 25 to 44, 32.0% from 45 to 64, and 16.0% who were 65 years of age or older. The median age was 45 years. For every 100 females, there were 150.0 males. For every 100 females age 18 and over, there were 144.4 males.

The median income for a household in the town was $38,750, and the median income for a family was $38,750. Males had a median income of $26,250 versus $18,750 for females. The per capita income for the town was $23,226. None of the population and none of the families were below the poverty line.
