= Spink County, South Dakota =

County in South Dakota, United States

- County
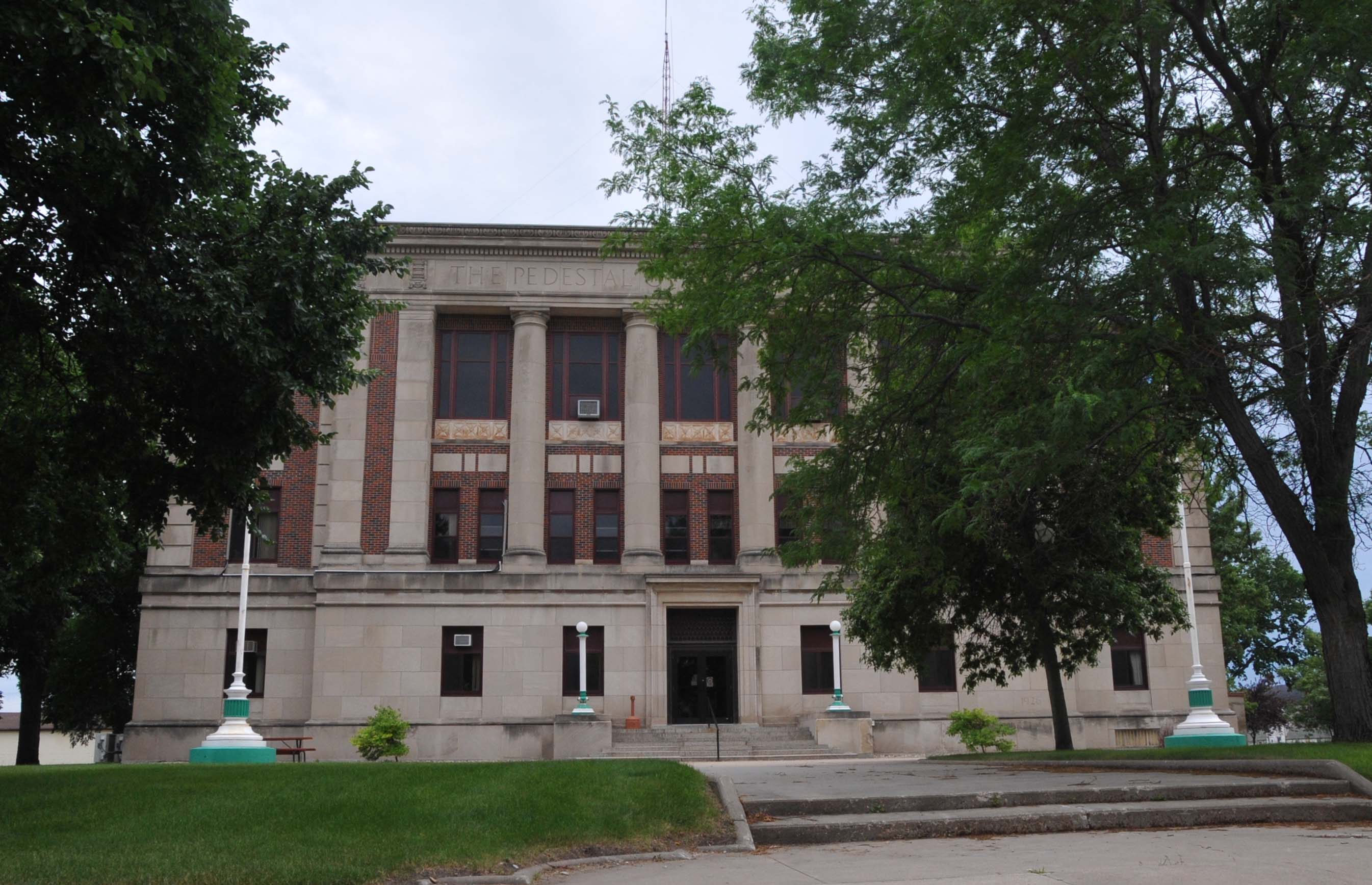
- Spink County Courthouse (2013)

- Location within the U.S. state of South Dakota
- Coordinates: 44°56′N 98°21′W
- Country: United States
- State: South Dakota
- Created: 1873
- Organized: 1879
- Named for: Solomon L. Spink
- Seat: Redfield
- Largest city: Redfield

Area
  - Total: 1,510 sq mi (3,900 km^{2})
  - Land: 1,504 sq mi (3,900 km^{2})
  - Water: 5.8 sq mi (15 km^{2}) 0.4%

Population (2020)
  - Total: 6,361
  - Estimate (2025): 6,155 ▼
  - Density: 4.1/sq mi (1.6/km^{2})
- Time zone: UTC−6 (Central)
  - Summer (DST): UTC−5 (CDT)
- Congressional district: At-large
- Website: www.spinkcounty-sd.org

Spink County is a county in the U.S. state of South Dakota. As of the 2020 census, the population was 6,361. Its county seat is Redfield. The county was created in 1873, and was organized in 1879 within Dakota Territory.

== History ==
Spink county was formed in 1879 as part of Dakota Territory. It folded to South Dakota in 1889. Spink County's population peaked before the Great Depression. In the years following, Spink County became one of the counties with the greatest percentage loss in population as part of the depopulation of the Great Plains.

== Geography ==
The terrain of Spink County consists of rolling hills, dedicated to agriculture. The James River flows southerly through the central portion of the county. The terrain slopes to the south; its highest point is in its northeast corner, at 1,424 ft (434 m) ASL. The county has a total area of 1,510 square miles (3,900 km^{2}), of which 1,504 square miles (3,900 km^{2}) is land and 5.8 square miles (15 km^{2}) (0.4%) is water.

=== Major highways ===
- U.S. Highway 212
- U.S. Highway 281
- South Dakota Highway 20
- South Dakota Highway 26
- South Dakota Highway 28
- South Dakota Highway 37

=== Protected area ===
- Fisher Grove State Park

=== Adjacent counties ===
- Brown County – north
- Day County – northeast
- Clark County – east
- Beadle County – south
- Hand County – southwest
- Faulk County – west

=== Lakes ===
- Alkali Lake
- Cottonwood Lake
- Twin Lakes

== Demographics ==
Historical population
Census	Pop.	Note	%±
1880	477		—
1890	10,581		2,118.2%
1900	9,487		−10.3%
1910	15,981		68.5%
1920	15,768		−1.3%
1930	15,304		−2.9%
1940	12,527		−18.1%
1950	12,204		−2.6%
1960	11,706		−4.1%
1970	10,595		−9.5%
1980	9,201		−13.2%
1990	7,981		−13.3%
2000	7,454		−6.6%
2010	6,415		−13.9%
2020	6,361		−0.8%
2025 (est.)	6,155	▼	−3.2%
U.S. Decennial Census

=== 2020 census ===
As of the 2020 census, there were 6,361 people, 2,520 households, and 1,560 families residing in the county. The population density was 4.2 inhabitants per square mile (1.6/km^{2}), and there were 2,983 housing units, of which 15.5% were vacant.

Of the residents, 23.3% were under the age of 18 and 22.0% were 65 years of age or older; the median age was 42.9 years. For every 100 females there were 99.5 males, and for every 100 females age 18 and over there were 98.5 males.

The racial makeup of the county was 94.7% White, 0.4% Black or African American, 1.1% American Indian and Alaska Native, 0.0% Asian, 0.9% from some other race, and 2.8% from two or more races. Hispanic or Latino residents of any race comprised 2.2% of the population.

Of the 2,520 households, 26.5% had children under the age of 18 living with them and 23.1% had a female householder with no spouse or partner present. About 34.3% of all households were made up of individuals and 16.1% had someone living alone who was 65 years of age or older.

Among occupied housing units, 74.6% were owner-occupied and 25.4% were renter-occupied. The homeowner vacancy rate was 2.1% and the rental vacancy rate was 12.5%.

=== 2010 census ===
As of the 2010 census, there were 6,415 people, 2,608 households, and 1,677 families in the county. The population density was 4.3 inhabitants per square mile (1.7/km^{2}). There were 3,139 housing units at an average density of 2.1 units per square mile (0.81 units/km^{2}). The racial makeup of the county was 97.1% white, 1.2% American Indian, 0.3% black or African American, 0.1% Asian, 0.4% from other races, and 0.9% from two or more races. Those of Hispanic or Latino origin made up 1.1% of the population. In terms of ancestry, 52.6% were German, 11.6% were Norwegian, 10.0% were Irish, 9.2% were English, and 5.5% were American.

Of the 2,608 households, 26.5% had children under the age of 18 living with them, 53.4% were married couples living together, 6.4% had a female householder with no husband present, 35.7% were non-families, and 31.8% of all households were made up of individuals. The average household size was 2.30 and the average family size was 2.89. The median age was 44.4 years.

The median income for a household in the county was $45,000 and the median income for a family was $60,639. Males had a median income of $40,273 versus $26,139 for females. The per capita income for the county was $25,295. About 8.2% of families and 17.0% of the population were below the poverty line, including 19.0% of those under age 18 and 12.0% of those age 65 or over.

Several Hutterite communities are in Spink County, including near Ashton and Stratford.

== Communities ==
=== Cities ===
- Ashton
- Conde
- Doland
- Frankfort
- Mellette
- Redfield (county seat)

=== Towns ===
- Brentford
- Northville
- Tulare
- Turton

=== Census-designated places ===
- Camrose Colony
- Clark Colony
- Glendale Colony
- Hillside Colony
- Mansfield (partial)
- Spink Colony

=== Other unincorporated communities ===
- Athol
- Crandon

=== Townships ===
- Antelope
- Athol
- Belle Plaine
- Belmont
- Benton
- Beotia
- Buffalo
- Capitola
- Clifton
- Conde
- Cornwall
- Crandon
- Exline
- Frankfort
- Garfield
- Great Bend
- Groveland
- Harmony
- Harrison
- Jefferson
- Lake
- La Prairie
- Lincoln
- Lodi
- Mellette
- Northville
- Olean
- Prairie Center
- Redfield
- Richfield
- Spring
- Sumner
- Tetonka
- Three Rivers
- Tulare
- Turton
- Union

== Politics ==
Spink County was historically a swing county, but in the past few decades has become fairly Republican. In no national election since 1992 has the county selected the Democratic Party candidate (as of 2024).

United States presidential election results for Spink County, South Dakota
Year	Republican		Democratic		Third party(ies)	
Year	No.	%	No.	%	No.	%
1892	1,133	53.04%	171	8.01%	832	38.95%
1896	1,132	51.31%	1,061	48.10%	13	0.59%
1900	1,496	56.41%	1,087	40.99%	69	2.60%
1904	2,127	74.53%	492	17.24%	235	8.23%
1908	1,847	59.01%	1,121	35.81%	162	5.18%
1912	0	0.00%	1,347	44.53%	1,678	55.47%
1916	1,660	48.61%	1,622	47.50%	133	3.89%
1920	2,923	65.09%	785	17.48%	783	17.43%
1924	2,613	57.81%	595	13.16%	1,312	29.03%
1928	3,868	60.89%	2,451	38.59%	33	0.52%
1932	2,433	36.67%	4,046	60.98%	156	2.35%
1936	2,078	35.39%	3,569	60.79%	224	3.82%
1940	2,975	48.70%	3,134	51.30%	0	0.00%
1944	2,365	50.86%	2,285	49.14%	0	0.00%
1948	2,310	45.59%	2,702	53.33%	55	1.09%
1952	3,693	65.06%	1,983	34.94%	0	0.00%
1956	2,683	48.29%	2,873	51.71%	0	0.00%
1960	2,738	51.65%	2,563	48.35%	0	0.00%
1964	1,953	38.50%	3,120	61.50%	0	0.00%
1968	2,068	42.08%	2,669	54.30%	178	3.62%
1972	2,547	52.19%	2,321	47.56%	12	0.25%
1976	2,003	42.81%	2,650	56.64%	26	0.56%
1980	2,915	60.30%	1,572	32.52%	347	7.18%
1984	2,627	60.75%	1,680	38.85%	17	0.39%
1988	1,969	48.47%	2,071	50.98%	22	0.54%
1992	1,527	37.14%	1,732	42.12%	853	20.74%
1996	1,651	45.00%	1,636	44.59%	382	10.41%
2000	1,957	59.59%	1,274	38.79%	53	1.61%
2004	2,259	59.86%	1,478	39.16%	37	0.98%
2008	1,660	50.78%	1,550	47.42%	59	1.80%
2012	1,670	54.92%	1,300	42.75%	71	2.33%
2016	1,854	62.83%	919	31.14%	178	6.03%
2020	2,104	66.52%	998	31.55%	61	1.93%
2024	2,145	68.33%	921	29.34%	73	2.33%

== See also ==
- National Register of Historic Places listings in Spink County, South Dakota
