= Tolstoy, South Dakota =

- Town
- Location in Potter County and the state of South Dakota
- Coordinates: 45°12′29″N 99°36′50″W
- Country: United States
- State: South Dakota
- County: Potter
- Incorporated: 1907

Area
  - Total: 0.18 sq mi (0.47 km^{2})
  - Land: 0.18 sq mi (0.47 km^{2})
  - Water: 0 sq mi (0.00 km^{2})
- Elevation: 1,939 ft (591 m)

Population (2020)
  - Total: 35
  - Density: 191.8/sq mi (74.04/km^{2})
- Time zone: UTC-6 (Central (CST))
  - Summer (DST): UTC-5 (CDT)
- ZIP code: 57475
- Area code: 605
- FIPS code: 46-63700
- GNIS feature ID: 1267601

Tolstoy is a town in Potter County, South Dakota, United States. The population was 35 at the 2020 census.

Tolstoy was laid out in 1907 and named after Leo Tolstoy.

== Geography ==
According to the United States Census Bureau, the town has a total area of 0.18 square miles (0.47 km^{2}), all land.

== Demographics ==
Historical population
Census	Pop.	Note	%±
1910	142		—
1920	183		28.9%
1930	210		14.8%
1940	171		−18.6%
1950	180		5.3%
1960	142		−21.1%
1970	99		−30.3%
1980	97		−2.0%
1990	69		−28.9%
2000	64		−7.2%
2010	36		−43.7%
2020	35		−2.8%
U.S. Decennial Census

=== 2010 census ===
At the 2010 census, there were 36 people, 20 households and 10 families residing in the town. The population density was 200.0 inhabitants per square mile (77.2/km^{2}). There were 31 housing units at an average density of 172.2 per square mile (66.5/km^{2}). The racial makeup of the town was 97.2% White and 2.8% Asian. Hispanic or Latino of any race were 2.8% of the population.

There were 20 households, of which 10.0% had children under the age of 18 living with them, 45.0% were married couples living together, 5.0% had a male householder with no wife present, and 50.0% were non-families. 40.0% of all households were made up of individuals, and 10% had someone living alone who was 65 years of age or older. The average household size was 1.80 and the average family size was 2.40.

The median age in the town was 54.3 years. 11.1% of residents were under the age of 18; 0.1% were between the ages of 18 and 24; 19.4% were from 25 to 44; 41.7% were from 45 to 64; and 27.8% were 65 years of age or older. The gender makeup of the town was 55.6% male and 44.4% female.

=== 2000 census ===
At the 2000 census, there were 64 people, 29 households and 20 families residing in the town. The population density was 357.3 inhabitants per square mile (138.0/km^{2}). There were 47 housing units at an average density of 262.4 per square mile (101.3/km^{2}). The racial makeup of the town was 100.00% White. Hispanic or Latino of any race accounted for 1.56% of the population.

There were 29 households, of which 17.2% had children under the age of 18 living with them, 69.0% were married couples living together, and 31.0% were non-families. 31.0% of all households were made up of individuals, and 20.7% had someone living alone who was 65 years of age or older. The average household size was 2.21 and the average family size was 2.75.

20.3% of the population were under the age of 18, 20.3% from 25 to 44, 21.9% from 45 to 64, and 37.5% who were 65 years of age or older. The median age was 58 years. For every 100 females, there were 82.9 males. For every 100 females age 18 and over, there were 82.1 males.

The median household income was $23,125 and the median family income was $24,375. Males had a median income of $9,375 compared with $11,250 for females. The per capita income for the town was $25,402. There were 11.8% of families and 19.2% of the population living below the poverty line, including 100.0% of under eighteens and none of those over 64.
