= Doland, South Dakota =

City in the United States

- City
- Motto: Home of Heroes
- Location in Spink County and the state of South Dakota
- Coordinates: 44°53′40″N 98°05′59″W
- Country: United States
- State: South Dakota
- County: Spink
- Established: 1886
- Incorporated: 1909

Government
  - Mayor: Stuart Bell

Area
  - Total: 0.59 sq mi (1.52 km^{2})
  - Land: 0.59 sq mi (1.52 km^{2})
  - Water: 0 sq mi (0.00 km^{2})
- Elevation: 1,355 ft (413 m)

Population (2020)
  - Total: 199
  - Density: 338.2/sq mi (130.57/km^{2})
- Time zone: UTC-6 (Central (CST))
  - Summer (DST): UTC-5 (CDT)
- ZIP code: 57436
- Area code: 605
- FIPS code: 46-16820
- GNIS feature ID: 1267355

Doland is a city in eastern Spink County, South Dakota, United States. The population was 199 at the 2020 census.

== History ==
Doland was platted in 1882. The city was named for Civil War veteran Franklin Henry Doland, an original owner of the town site. Doland purchased several hundred acres in the expected path of the Chicago and North Western railroad which was moving westward into South Dakota. The railroad created a depot for shipping for farmers at the location. A post office has been in operation in Doland since 1882.

== Geography ==
According to the United States Census Bureau, the city has a total area of 0.59 square miles (1.53 km^{2}), all land.

== Demographics ==
Historical population
Census	Pop.	Note	%±
1890	216		—
1900	235		8.8%
1910	581		147.2%
1920	667		14.8%
1930	538		−19.3%
1940	542		0.7%
1950	535		−1.3%
1960	481		−10.1%
1970	430		−10.6%
1980	381		−11.4%
1990	306		−19.7%
2000	297		−2.9%
2010	180		−39.4%
2020	199		10.6%
U.S. Decennial Census

=== 2020 census ===
As of the 2020 census, Doland had a population of 199. The median age was 44.7 years, with 19.6% of residents under the age of 18 and 20.1% of residents 65 years of age or older. For every 100 females there were 99.0 males, and for every 100 females age 18 and over there were 107.8 males age 18 and over.

There were 88 households in Doland, of which 23.9% had children under the age of 18 living in them. Of all households, 48.9% were married-couple households, 25.0% were households with a male householder and no spouse or partner present, and 20.5% were households with a female householder and no spouse or partner present. About 32.9% of all households were made up of individuals and 11.3% had someone living alone who was 65 years of age or older.

There were 117 housing units, of which 24.8% were vacant. The homeowner vacancy rate was 1.5% and the rental vacancy rate was 30.3%.

0.0% of residents lived in urban areas, while 100.0% lived in rural areas.

Racial composition as of the 2020 census
Race	Number	Percent
White	178	89.4%
Black or African American	0	0.0%
American Indian and Alaska Native	0	0.0%
Asian	0	0.0%
Native Hawaiian and Other Pacific Islander	0	0.0%
Some other race	9	4.5%
Two or more races	12	6.0%
Hispanic or Latino (of any race)	13	6.5%

=== 2010 census ===
As of the census of 2010, there were 180 people, 95 households, and 47 families residing in the city. The population density was 305.1 inhabitants per square mile (117.8/km^{2}). There were 131 housing units at an average density of 222.0 per square mile (85.7/km^{2}). The racial makeup of the city was 98.9% White, 0.6% Native American, and 0.6% from two or more races. Hispanic or Latino of any race were 1.7% of the population.

There were 95 households, of which 14.7% had children under the age of 18 living with them, 40.0% were married couples living together, 5.3% had a female householder with no husband present, 4.2% had a male householder with no wife present, and 50.5% were non-families. 46.3% of all households were made up of individuals, and 17.9% had someone living alone who was 65 years of age or older. The average household size was 1.89 and the average family size was 2.68.

The median age in the city was 50.2 years. 15.6% of residents were under the age of 18; 7.7% were between the ages of 18 and 24; 15% were from 25 to 44; 42.8% were from 45 to 64; and 18.9% were 65 years of age or older. The gender makeup of the city was 47.2% male and 52.8% female.

=== 2000 census ===
As of the census of 2000, there were 297 people, 120 households, and 75 families residing in the city. The population density was 504.0 inhabitants per square mile (194.6/km^{2}). There were 159 housing units at an average density of 269.8 per square mile (104.2/km^{2}). The racial makeup of the city was 96.97% White, 0.67% African American, 1.35% Native American, 0.34% from other races, and 0.67% from two or more races. Hispanic or Latino of any race were 0.67% of the population.

There were 120 households, out of which 33.3% had children under the age of 18 living with them, 55.0% were married couples living together, 5.0% had a female householder with no husband present, and 36.7% were non-families. 34.2% of all households were made up of individuals, and 19.2% had someone living alone who was 65 years of age or older. The average household size was 2.48 and the average family size was 3.22.

In the city, the population was spread out, with 30.3% under the age of 18, 5.7% from 18 to 24, 29.0% from 25 to 44, 20.2% from 45 to 64, and 14.8% who were 65 years of age or older. The median age was 37 years. For every 100 females, there were 95.4 males. For every 100 females age 18 and over, there were 97.1 males.

The median income for a household in the city was $30,313, and the median income for a family was $35,625. Males had a median income of $24,375 versus $20,357 for females. The per capita income for the city was $17,437. About 20.3% of families and 19.9% of the population were below the poverty line, including 28.4% of those under the age of eighteen and 14.3% of those 65 or over.

== Schools ==
The Doland Public School system includes Doland Elementary School PK-6; Hillside Colony School K-8; Doland Junior High School (about 20 students) 7-8; and Doland High School (about 50 students).

== Notable people ==
- Hubert Humphrey (vice president 1964-1968 and presidential candidate 1968) was raised in Doland graduating from Doland High School in 1929. Humphrey's father ran a pharmacy in Doland.
- Dennis Koslowski, 1992 Olympic silver medalist and the twin brother of Olympian Duane Koslowski.
- Jon Madsen, professional Mixed Martial Artist
- Tim Miles, basketball coach, San Jose State University
- Harvey L. Wollman, 26th Governor of South Dakota
- Roger Leland Wollman, Chief Justice of the Supreme Court of South Dakota

== See also ==
- List of cities in South Dakota
