= Frankfort, South Dakota =

- City
- Location in Spink County and the state of South Dakota
- Coordinates: 44°52′40″N 98°18′33″W
- Country: United States
- State: South Dakota
- County: Spink

Area
  - Total: 0.79 sq mi (2.04 km^{2})
  - Land: 0.79 sq mi (2.04 km^{2})
  - Water: 0 sq mi (0.00 km^{2})
- Elevation: 1,296 ft (395 m)

Population (2020)
  - Total: 134
  - Density: 170.1/sq mi (65.69/km^{2})
- Time zone: UTC-6 (Central (CST))
  - Summer (DST): UTC-5 (CDT)
- ZIP code: 57440
- Area code: 605
- FIPS code: 46-22580
- GNIS feature ID: 1267394

Frankfort is a city in Spink County, South Dakota, United States. The population was 134 at the 2020 census.

== History ==
Frankfort was platted in 1882. Some say it was named after Frankfurt, in Germany, while others believe the town has the name of Frankfort I. Fisher, a pioneer settler. A post office has been in operation in Frankfort since 1882.

== Geography ==
According to the United States Census Bureau, the city has a total area of 0.79 square miles (2.05 km^{2}), all land.

== Demographics ==
Historical population
Census	Pop.	Note	%±
1890	186		—
1900	198		6.5%
1910	408		106.1%
1920	438		7.4%
1930	367		−16.2%
1940	335		−8.7%
1950	331		−1.2%
1960	240		−27.5%
1970	192		−20.0%
1980	209		8.9%
1990	192		−8.1%
2000	166		−13.5%
2010	149		−10.2%
2020	134		−10.1%
U.S. Decennial Census

=== 2020 census ===
As of the 2020 census, Frankfort had a population of 134. The median age was 52.5 years. 24.6% of residents were under the age of 18 and 29.9% of residents were 65 years of age or older. For every 100 females there were 109.4 males, and for every 100 females age 18 and over there were 114.9 males age 18 and over.

0.0% of residents lived in urban areas, while 100.0% lived in rural areas.

There were 58 households in Frankfort, of which 15.5% had children under the age of 18 living in them. Of all households, 44.8% were married-couple households, 25.9% were households with a male householder and no spouse or partner present, and 25.9% were households with a female householder and no spouse or partner present. About 43.1% of all households were made up of individuals and 20.7% had someone living alone who was 65 years of age or older. There were 70 housing units, of which 17.1% were vacant. The homeowner vacancy rate was 1.8% and the rental vacancy rate was 42.9%.

Racial composition as of the 2020 census
Race	Number	Percent
White	127	94.8%
Black or African American	0	0.0%
American Indian and Alaska Native	0	0.0%
Asian	0	0.0%
Native Hawaiian and Other Pacific Islander	0	0.0%
Some other race	1	0.7%
Two or more races	6	4.5%
Hispanic or Latino (of any race)	3	2.2%

=== 2010 census ===
As of the census of 2010, there were 149 people, 61 households, and 37 families residing in the city. The population density was 188.6 inhabitants per square mile (72.8/km^{2}). There were 82 housing units at an average density of 103.8 per square mile (40.1/km^{2}). The racial makeup of the city was 94.6% White, 3.4% Native American, and 2.0% from other races. Hispanic or Latino of any race were 2.0% of the population.

There were 61 households, of which 24.6% had children under the age of 18 living with them, 50.8% were married couples living together, 6.6% had a female householder with no husband present, 3.3% had a male householder with no wife present, and 39.3% were non-families. 32.8% of all households were made up of individuals, and 13.1% had someone living alone who was 65 years of age or older. The average household size was 2.44 and the average family size was 3.19.

The median age in the city was 42.6 years. 29.5% of residents were under the age of 18; 4.1% were between the ages of 18 and 24; 18.1% were from 25 to 44; 26.8% were from 45 to 64; and 21.5% were 65 years of age or older. The gender makeup of the city was 49.7% male and 50.3% female.

=== 2000 census ===
As of the census of 2000, there were 166 people, 81 households, and 43 families residing in the city. The population density was 214.4 inhabitants per square mile (82.8/km^{2}). There were 99 housing units at an average density of 127.9 per square mile (49.4/km^{2}). The racial makeup of the city was 98.80% White, 0.60% Native American, 0.60% from other races. Hispanic or Latino of any race were 0.60% of the population.

There were 81 households, out of which 18.5% had children under the age of 18 living with them, 48.1% were married couples living together, 4.9% had a female householder with no husband present, and 46.9% were non-families. 40.7% of all households were made up of individuals, and 14.8% had someone living alone who was 65 years of age or older. The average household size was 2.05 and the average family size was 2.84.

In the city, the population was spread out, with 20.5% under the age of 18, 6.6% from 18 to 24, 15.7% from 25 to 44, 31.9% from 45 to 64, and 25.3% who were 65 years of age or older. The median age was 49 years. For every 100 females, there were 115.6 males. For every 100 females age 18 and over, there were 109.5 males.

The median income for a household in the city was $30,357, and the median income for a family was $39,688. Males had a median income of $22,500 versus $17,000 for females. The per capita income for the city was $14,989. About 4.3% of families and 9.2% of the population were below the poverty line, including 18.8% of those under the age of eighteen and 12.2% of those 65 or over.

== Notable people ==
- Harvey Wollman, the twenty-sixth Governor of South Dakota, was born in Frankfort.
- Roger Leland Wollman, United States judge, was born in Frankfort.
- Wilbur Thompson, track and field athlete, Olympic medalist
