= National Register of Historic Places listings in Hutchinson County, South Dakota =

Location of Hutchinson County in South Dakota

This is a list of the National Register of Historic Places listings in Hutchinson County, South Dakota.

This is intended to be a complete list of the properties on the National Register of Historic Places in Hutchinson County, South Dakota, United States. The locations of National Register properties for which the latitude and longitude coordinates are included below, may be seen in a map.

There are 31 properties listed on the National Register in the county.

This National Park Service list is complete through NPS recent listings posted June 20, 2025.

== Current listings ==
	Name on the Register	Image	Date listed	Location	City or town	Description
1	Ludwig Deckert House		August 13, 1984 (#84003309)	On the Freeman College campus 43°20′44″N 97°26′13″W	Freeman	
2	First National Bank, Freeman		September 1, 2015 (#15000564)	394 S. Main St. 43°21′06″N 97°26′14″W	Freeman	
3	Freeman Junior College		December 15, 2004 (#04001362)	748 S. Main St. 43°20′56″N 97°26′17″W	Freeman	
4	Martin and Wilhelminn Grosz House-Barn		August 13, 1984 (#84003311)	Western half of the southwestern quadrant of Section 31, T98N, R58W; 43°15′40″N 97°45′10″W	Olivet	
5	Enoch Hofer House-Barn		November 28, 1984 (#84001278)	Southwestern corner of the southwestern quadrant of Section 35, T100N, R56W; 43°25′48″N 97°26′12″W	Freeman	
6	Michael Hofer House		August 13, 1984 (#84003316)	Southwestern quarter of the southeastern quadrant of Section 22, T99N, R56W; 43°22′20″N 97°26′46″W	Freeman	
7	Holzworth-Lang House		November 28, 1984 (#84001284)	Northeastern quarter of the southwestern quadrant of Section 27, T99N, R57W; 43°21′49″N 97°34′24″W	Freeman	
8	Kost Farm Barn		August 14, 2003 (#03000766)	42247 280th St. 43°18′00″N 97°44′43″W	Olivet	
9	Mettler Cattle Barn		June 24, 2025 (#100011964)	616 N. 5th St. 43°14′40″N 97°34′42″W	Menno	
10	Milltown Hutterite Colony		June 30, 1982 (#82004658)	On the James River; 43°25′42″N 97°47′37″W	Milltown	
11	New Elmspring Colony		June 30, 1982 (#82004656)	On the James River; 43°29′14″N 97°49′52″W	Ethan	
12	Old Elmspring Hutterite Colony		June 30, 1982 (#82004659)	Off the James River; 43°29′56″N 97°48′01″W	Parkston	
13	Old Maxwell Hutterite Colony		June 30, 1982 (#82004660)	Southeast of Olivet; 43°11′02″N 97°38′05″W	Scotland	
14	Salem Church Parsonage		April 19, 2001 (#01000392)	206 S. High St. 43°14′19″N 97°34′35″W	Menno	
15	Jacob Schatz House		August 13, 1984 (#84003318)	Northeastern quarter of the southwestern quadrant of Section 33, T99N, R57W; 43°20′52″N 97°35′26″W	Freeman	
16	Gottlieb Schmitt House		November 6, 1986 (#86003011)	150 W. Poplar; 43°14′17″N 97°34′41″W	Menno	
17	Edward Schnaidt House		June 6, 2001 (#01000632)	215 South Pearl; 43°14′16″N 97°34′30″W	Menno	
18	Site 39HT14		January 31, 1984 (#84003320)	Address restricted	Olivet	
19	Site 39HT27		February 1, 1984 (#84003323)	Address restricted	Clayton	
20	Site 39HT29		February 1, 1984 (#84003325)	Address restricted	Clayton	
21	Sites 39HT30 and 39HT202		February 1, 1984 (#84003327)	Address restricted	Clayton	
22	South Dakota Dept of Trans. Bridge No. 34-202-072		May 30, 2002 (#02000581)	424th Ave. 43°23′54″N 97°42′48″W	Parkston	
23	South Dakota Dept. of Trans. Bridge No. 34-120-194		May 30, 2002 (#02000579)	Local road over the South Fork of Lonetree Creek; 43°13′02″N 97°52′19″W	Tripp	
24	South Dakota Dept. of Trans. Bridge No. 34-140-046		May 30, 2002 (#02000583)	418th Ave. 43°26′01″N 97°50′16″W	Milltown	
25	Gottlieb Stern House		November 28, 1984 (#84001287)	Northwestern corner of the southeastern quadrant of Section 17, T99N, R57W; 43°23′28″N 97°36′19″W	Freeman	
26	Tucek-Sykora Farmstead		February 17, 2009 (#09000044)	28883 412th Ave. 43°11′51″N 97°57′08″W	Tripp	
27	J. W. Ulmer House		June 17, 1982 (#82004657)	611 5th St. 43°14′05″N 97°34′40″W	Menno	
28	United Brethren Church in Christ		June 8, 2007 (#07000531)	Lots 5 through 10 in Block 20; 43°25′37″N 97°48′12″W	Milltown	
29	George Vetter House		August 13, 1984 (#84003329)	Along Musenholder Creek in the southeastern quadrant of Section 12, T97N, R60W; 43°13′49″N 97°52′52″W	Tripp	
30	Joseph Wollman House		November 28, 1984 (#84001292)	Northwestern quarter of the northeastern quadrant of Section 31, T99N, R56W; 43°21′18″N 97°30′34″W	Freeman	
31	Wilhelm Ziegler House-Barn		August 13, 1984 (#84003332)	Southeastern quarter of the northeastern quadrant of Section 18, T97N, R59W; 43°13′14″N 97°51′26″W	Kaylor	

== See also ==
- List of National Historic Landmarks in South Dakota
- National Register of Historic Places listings in South Dakota
