= Freeman =

Freeman, free men, Freeman's or Freemans may refer to:

== Arts and media ==
=== Films ===
- Free Man (film) (Turkish: Hür Adam: Bediüzzaman Said Nursi), a 2011 Turkish biographical film
- Free Men (film), a 2011 French war drama film written and directed by Ismaël Ferroukhi
- Freeman (film), a 2020 Australian documentary film about athlete Cathy Freeman

=== Literature ===
- "Free Men" a science fiction short story by Robert A. Heinlein

=== Music ===
==== Musicians ====
- Freeman (band), band formed by Ween co-founder Aaron Freeman
- Freeman (rapper), French-Algerian rapper and dancer
- Freeman (singer) (born 1951), Finnish musician

==== Albums and songs ====
- FreeMan, 1995 Francis Magalona album
- Freeman (Freeman album), their 2014 debut album
- Freeman (Labyrinth album), 2005 Labyrinth album, or the title track
- "Freeman", a 2024 song by Vince Staples from the album Dark Times

== Businesses ==
- Freemans, a British online and catalogue multi-channel retailer
- Freeman's-Hindman, formerly called Freeman's, an American auction house
- W. H. Freeman and Company, an American publisher

== People and fictional characters ==
- Freeman (given name), includes a list of people and fictional characters
- Freeman (surname), includes a list of people and fictional characters
- Freeman, a member of the Third Estate in medieval society (commoners)
- Freeman, a member or an apprentice who has been granted freedom of the company, a rank within livery companies
- Freeman, a person who has been awarded Freedom of the City
- Freeman, in Middle English synonymous with franklin (class), initially a person not tied to land as a villein or serf, later a land-owner
- Freeman (Thirteen Colonies), in North American colonial times, a person not under legal restraint

== Places ==
=== United States ===
- Freeman, Georgia, an unincorporated community
- Freeman, Illinois, an unincorporated community
- Freeman, Indiana, an unincorporated community
- Freeman, South Dakota, a city
- Freeman, Virginia, an unincorporated community
- Freeman, Washington, an unincorporated community
- Freeman, Wisconsin, a town
- Freeman, Langlade County, Wisconsin, an unincorporated community
- Freeman Island, an island in the state of Washington
- Freeman Peak, a mountain in Idaho
- Freeman Township, Michigan
- Freeman Township, Freeborn County, Minnesota

=== Norway ===
- Freeman Strait (Freemansundet), a body of water

== Schools ==
- City of London Freemen's School, a school in London
- Freeman High School (disambiguation)
- Freeman Academy, a school in South Dakota

== Other uses ==
- NOAAS Miller Freeman (R 223), a National Oceanic and Atmospheric Administration fisheries and oceanographic research ship in commission from 1974 to 2013

== See also ==
- The Freeman (disambiguation)
- Freman (disambiguation)
- Battle of Freeman's Farm, an American Revolutionary War battle
- Crying Freeman (film), a 1995 action film
- Free tenant, a social class in the Middle Ages
- The Freed Man, 1989 album by Sebadoh
- Freedman, a slave freed from bondage
- Freeman–Sheldon syndrome, a congenital disease
- Freemen on the land, a self-styled modern movement asserting that law must be contracted with individuals to be valid
- Fremen, a people in the Dune series
- Montana Freemen, a self-styled Christian patriot group in Montana
