= List of newspapers in South Dakota =

This is a list of newspapers in South Dakota.

== Current news publications ==
- Aberdeen American News - Aberdeen, Daily
- Alcester Union & Hudsonite - Alcester/Hudson, Weekly
- Argus Leader - Sioux Falls, Daily
- Arlington Sun - Arlington, South Dakota
- Bennett County Booster II - Martin
- Beresford Republic - Beresford
- Bison Courier - Bison
- Black Hills Pioneer - Spearfish
- Brandon Valley Challenger - Brandon
- Britton Journal - Britton
- Brookings Register - Brookings
- Capital Journal - Pierre
- Central Dakota Times - Chamberlain
- Clark County Courier - Clark
- Clear Lake Courier - Clear Lake
- Custer County Chronicle - Custer
- Day County Reporter and Farmer - Webster
- Faulk County Record - Faulkton
- Freeman Courier - Freeman
- Grant County Review - Milbank
- Gregory Times-Advocate - Gregory
- Hot Springs Star - Hot Springs
- Huron Plainsman - Huron
- Indian Country Today - Rapid City
- Lakota Daily Times - Martin
- Lennox Independent - Lennox
- Madison Daily Leader - Madison
- Meade County Times-Tribune - Sturgis
- Miller Press - Miller
- Miner County Pioneer - Howard
- Mitchell Daily Republic - Mitchell
- Mobridge Tribune - Mobridge
- Moody County Enterprise - Flandreau
- Onida Watchman - Onida
- Parkston Advance - Parkston
- Pioneer Review - Philip
- Plain Talk - Vermillion
- Platte Entreprise - Platte
- Potter County News - Gettysburg
- Prairie Pioneer - Pollock
- Rapid City Journal - Rapid City
- The Rapid City Post - Rapid City
- Redfield Press - Redfield
- Sioux Valley News - Canton
- Sisseton Courier - Sisseton
- Sota Iya Ye Yapi - Wilmot
- Southern Union County Leader-Courier - Elk Point
- Timber Lake Topic - Timber Lake
- Todd County Tribune - Mission
- True Dakotan - Wessington Springs
- Vermillion Plain Talk - Vermillion
- Wagner Post - Wagner
- Watertown Public Opinion - Watertown
- West River Eagle - Eagle Butte
- Winner Advocate - Winner
- Woonsocket Sanborn Weekly Journal - Woonsocket
- Yankton Daily Press & Dakotan - Yankton

== Defunct ==
- Dakota Farmers' Leader (Canton) (1890-19??)
- Kadoka Press - Kadoka (1908-1942, defunct)
- South Dakota Messenger - Pierre (1912-1914, defunct)

== See also ==
Comprehensive

- Lists of newspapers
- List of newspapers in the United States

Frequency

- List of free daily newspapers in the United States
- List of weekly newspapers in the United States

Circulation

- List of international newspapers originating in the United States
- List of national newspapers in the United States
- List of newspapers in the United States by circulation
- List of newspapers serving cities over 100,000 in the United States

Foreign language

- List of French-language newspapers published in the United States
- List of German-language newspapers published in the United States
- List of Spanish-language newspapers published in the United States

Specialty

- List of African-American newspapers in the United States
- List of alternative weekly newspapers in the United States
- List of business newspapers in the United States
- List of family-owned newspapers in the United States
- List of Jewish newspapers in the United States
- List of LGBTQ periodicals in the United States
- List of student newspapers in the United States
- List of supermarket tabloids in the United States
- List of underground press in the United States

Other

- List of defunct newspapers of the United States
