= United Brethren Church =

United Brethren Church may refer to:

== Denominations ==
- Church of the United Brethren in Christ
- Church of the United Brethren in Christ (Old Constitution)
- Church of the United Brethren in Christ (New Constitution)
- Evangelical United Brethren Church

== Buildings and congregations ==
- United Brethren in Christ (Cincinnati, Ohio), listed on the National Register of Historic Places in Cincinnati, Ohio
- United Brethren Church (Aurora, Nebraska), listed on the National Register of Historic Places in Hamilton County, Nebraska
- United Brethren Church (West Akron, South Dakota), listed on the National Register of Historic Places in Union County, South Dakota
