= Salem Methodist Church =

Salem Methodist Church or Salem Methodist Episcopal Church may refer to:

- Salem Methodist Episcopal Church (Clinton, Indiana), listed on the NRHP in Indiana
- Salem Methodist Episcopal Church and Parsonage (Newport, Kentucky), listed on the NRHP in Kentucky
- Salem Methodist Episcopal Church and Salem Walker Cemetery (Northville, Michigan), listed on the NRHP in Michigan
- Salem Methodist Church (Franklin, North Carolina), listed on the NRHP in North Carolina
- Salem Methodist Church (Huntsboro, North Carolina), listed on the NRHP in North Carolina
- Salem Methodist Church Complex (Cincinnati, Ohio), listed on the NRHP in Ohio
- Salem Methodist Episcopal Church (Salem, Ohio), listed on the NRHP in Ohio
- Salem United Methodist Church (New York City), listed on the NRHP in New York

== See also ==
- Salem Church (disambiguation)
- Salem Cemetery (disambiguation)
