= Wolf Creek Colony, South Dakota =

- Census-designated place
- Location within South Dakota Location within the United States
- Coordinates: 43°21′10″N 97°36′58″W
- Country: United States
- State: South Dakota
- County: Hutchinson

Area
  - Total: 0.51 sq mi (1.32 km^{2})
  - Land: 0.51 sq mi (1.32 km^{2})
  - Water: 0 sq mi (0.00 km^{2})
- Elevation: 1,214 ft (370 m)

Population (2020)
  - Total: 0
  - Density: 0/sq mi (0/km^{2})
- Time zone: UTC-6 (Central (CST))
  - Summer (DST): UTC-5 (CDT)
- ZIP Code: 57029 (Freeman)
- Area code: 605
- FIPS code: 46-72500
- GNIS feature ID: 2813034

Wolf Creek Colony is a Hutterite colony and census-designated place (CDP) in Hutchinson County, South Dakota, United States. The population was 0 at the 2020 census. It was first listed as a CDP prior to the 2020 census.

It is in the east-central part of the county, in the valley of Wolf Creek just north of where it flows into the James River. It is 10 miles (16 km) by road northeast of Olivet, the county seat, and the same distance west of Freeman.

== Demographics ==
Historical population
Census	Pop.	Note	%±
2020	0		—
U.S. Decennial Census
