= New Elm Spring Colony, South Dakota =

- Census-designated place
- Location within South Dakota Location within the United States
- Coordinates: 43°29′16″N 97°49′46″W
- Country: United States
- State: South Dakota
- County: Hutchinson

Area
  - Total: 0.50 sq mi (1.29 km^{2})
  - Land: 0.50 sq mi (1.29 km^{2})
  - Water: 0 sq mi (0.00 km^{2})
- Elevation: 1,302 ft (397 m)

Population (2020)
  - Total: 100
  - Density: 201.4/sq mi (77.75/km^{2})
- Time zone: UTC-6 (Central (CST))
  - Summer (DST): UTC-5 (CDT)
- ZIP Code: 57334 (Ethan)
- Area code: 605
- FIPS code: 46-44900
- GNIS feature ID: 2813037

New Elm Spring Colony is a Hutterite colony and census-designated place (CDP) in Hutchinson County, South Dakota, United States. The population was 100 at the 2020 census. It was first listed as a CDP before the 2020 census.

It is in the northern part of the county, on high ground to the west of the James River. It is 25 miles (40 km) by road northwest of Olivet, the county seat, and 13 miles (21 km) northeast of Parkston. Old Elm Spring Colony is 3 miles (5 km) to the east, across the James River.

== Demographics ==
Historical population
Census	Pop.	Note	%±
2020	100		—
U.S. Decennial Census
