= Schmeckfest =

Food festival in South Dakota, USA

Coordinates: 43°20′49″N 97°26′19″W

Schmeckfest (festival of tasting) is an annual festival in Freeman, South Dakota, that celebrates the heritage and culture of Plautdietsch-speaking Mennonites from the Russian Empire who emigrated to North America starting in the 1870s. Established in 1959, Schmeckfest showcases the traditional foods, crafts and talents of the Freeman community with Mennonite food, demonstrations, displays, programs and a full-stage musical theater production.

Schmeckfest has been held every spring since and has grown to accommodate more than 5,000 guests every year. The event is held at Freeman Academy, a grade 1 to 12 private school, and raises about $90,000 annually for the school.

A multi-course meal and a musical are the main fundraising events. The festival also includes displays, programs, demonstrations and sales of ethnic handcrafts and culinary arts. In recent years, Heritage Hall Museum and Archives, located adjacent to the Freeman Academy campus, offers historical presentations during Schmeckfest.

The Schmeckfest meal was served buffet style in the early years before switching to family style in 1965. In 2018, buffet-style serving returned for the 60th Schmeckfest, which is part of an emphasis on the historic nature of the 2018 observance and continues as the dining format.

A book on the 60-year history of Schmeckfest was published in 2018. "Schmeckfest at 60" is a 252-page hardcover book that includes a comprehensive look at the festival and more the 150 photos and illustrations. It was published by Second Century Publishing Inc., of Freeman which also publishes the Freeman Courier. Copies are available for sale at the Courier office in downtown Freeman.

== Beginning ==
South Dakota Mennonite College was founded in 1900, and three years later, classes began in "The College" building (today's "Music Hall"), located one-quarter mile south of the downtown area of Freeman, S.D. Today, Freeman Academy is a private Christian school for grades 1-12.

The first Schmeckfest was Friday, March 13, 1959. The German "tasting festival" was served buffet style in the basement of Pioneer Hall in Freeman, SD. All guests were encouraged to "take all you want, but eat all you take". The cost of meal tickets was one dollar for adults and fifty cents for grade school children. Preschool-aged kids ate free. Serving began at 5:00 p.m. followed at 7:00 by a "period of relaxation with recorded German music" and a talent program. The popularity of that first festival exceeded expectations; many people were disappointed to learn the German food was gone by the time they arrived; volunteers ended up making multiple trips to local grocery stores for food they could quickly prepare for people patiently waiting in line. But the organizers, the Freeman Junior College Women's Auxiliary, saw the interest in the event and the potential it offered.

Schmeckfest became an annual event starting in 1960, expanding to two days, three days, and eventually, two consecutive two-day weekends in late March / early April. During the Covid-19 pandemic years of 2020-2022, instead of a sit-down meal, the Schmeckfest meal was offered for carryout only, and no cultural activities were held. Schmeckfest returned to its previous format starting in 2023, but on one weekend only. With Freeman Academy exploring its options for the future as of early 2026, the future of Schmeckfest may be in doubt.
