= United Brethren in Christ =

United Brethren in Christ may refer to:

- Church of the United Brethren in Christ (Old Constitution)
- Church of the United Brethren in Christ (New Constitution)
- Church of the United Brethren in Christ, the evangelical Christian denomination

Or a specific church building

- United Brethren in Christ (Cincinnati, Ohio), a historic church building

== See also ==
- United Brethren (disambiguation)
