= Salem Presbyterian Church =

Salem Presbyterian Church may refer to:

- Beth Salem Presbyterian Church, Athens, Tennessee, listed on the National Register of Historic Places (NRHP)
- Salem Presbyterian Church (Limestone, Tennessee), NRHP-listed
- Salem Presbyterian Church (Washington College, Tennessee), NRHP-listed
- Salem Presbyterian Church (Salem, Virginia), NRHP-listed
- Salem Presbyterian Parsonage, Salem, Virginia, NRHP-listed

== See also ==
- Salem Church (disambiguation)
- Salem Cemetery (disambiguation)
