= Salem Evangelical Church =

Salem Evangelical Church may refer to:

- Salem Evangelical Church, built 1942 in Rolling Meadows, Illinois
- Salem Evangelical Church, built 1862 in Blue Earth, Minnesota
- Salem Evangelical Church, part of the German United Evangelical Church Complex in Rochester, New York
- Salem Evangelical Church (Milwaukee, Wisconsin), listed on the NRHP in Wisconsin
- Salem Evangelical Church (Plain, Wisconsin), listed on the NRHP in Wisconsin

== See also ==
- German Evangelical Salem Church, listed on the NRHP in Le Sueur County, Minnesota
- Salem Church (disambiguation)
- Salem Cemetery (disambiguation)
