= Salem Church =

Salem Church may refer to:

== In the United States ==
- Old Salem Church and Cemetery, Catonsville, Maryland, listed on the National Register of Historic Places (NRHP)
- Salem Church (Sardis, Ohio), NRHP-listed
- Salem Church (Tulare, South Dakota), NRHP-listed
- Battle of Salem Church, Virginia

== Elsewhere ==
- Salem Church, Cheslyn Hay, a church in Staffordshire, England
- Salem Church in Habo, a church in Sweden

== See also ==
- Salem Church Parsonage, Menno, South Dakota, NRHP-listed
- Salem Evangelical Church (disambiguation)
- Salem Methodist Church (disambiguation)
- Salem Presbyterian Church (disambiguation)
- Salem Lutheran Church
