= Tschetter Colony, South Dakota =

- Census-designated place
- Location within South Dakota Location within the United States
- Coordinates: 43°22′05″N 97°41′17″W
- Country: United States
- State: South Dakota
- County: Hutchinson

Area
  - Total: 0.54 sq mi (1.39 km^{2})
  - Land: 0.53 sq mi (1.38 km^{2})
  - Water: 0.0039 sq mi (0.01 km^{2})
- Elevation: 1,240 ft (380 m)

Population (2020)
  - Total: 165
  - Density: 309.2/sq mi (119.39/km^{2})
- Time zone: UTC-6 (Central (CST))
  - Summer (DST): UTC-5 (CDT)
- ZIP Code: 57052 (Olivet)
- Area code: 605
- FIPS code: 46-64260
- GNIS feature ID: 2813036

Tschetter Colony is a Hutterite colony and census-designated place (CDP) in Hutchinson County, South Dakota, United States. The population was 165 at the 2020 census. It was first listed as a CDP prior to the 2020 census.

It is in the central part of the county, on the southwest side of the James River. It is 9 miles (14 km) north of Olivet, the county seat.

== Demographics ==
Historical population
Census	Pop.	Note	%±
2020	165		—
U.S. Decennial Census
