= Old Elm Spring Colony, South Dakota =

Census-designated place in South Dakota

- Census-designated place
- Location within South Dakota Location within the United States
- Coordinates: 43°29′33″N 97°47′56″W
- Country: United States
- State: South Dakota
- County: Hutchinson
- Established: 1876

Area
  - Total: 1.00 sq mi (2.59 km^{2})
  - Land: 0.97 sq mi (2.52 km^{2})
  - Water: 0.023 sq mi (0.06 km^{2})
- Elevation: 1,322 ft (403 m)

Population (2020)
  - Total: 114
  - Density: 116.9/sq mi (45.15/km^{2})
- Time zone: UTC-6 (Central (CST))
  - Summer (DST): UTC-5 (CDT)
- ZIP Code: 57366 (Parkston)
- Area code: 605
- FIPS code: 46-46770
- GNIS feature ID: 2813033
- Old Elmspring Hutterite Colony
- U.S. National Register of Historic Places
- Nearest city: Parkston, South Dakota
- Area: 8 acres (3.2 ha)
- MPS: Historic Hutterite Colonies TR
- NRHP reference No.: 82004659
- Added to NRHP: June 30, 1982

Old Elm Spring Colony, formerly called the Old Elmspring Hutterite Colony, is a Hutterite colony and census-designated place (CDP) in Hutchinson County, South Dakota, United States. The population was 114 at the 2020 census. It was first listed as a CDP prior to the 2020 census.

It is on the northern edge of the county, bordered to the north by Hanson County. It is on high ground on the east side of the James River. It is 24 miles (39 km) north-northwest of Olivet, the county seat, and 17 miles (27 km) northeast of Parkston. New Elm Spring Colony is 3 miles (5 km) to the west, across the James River.

It began as a Hutterite colony in 1876. In 1982 it was listed on the National Register of Historic Places as part of the Historic Hutterite Colonies Thematic Resource, and included six contributing buildings over 8 acres (3.2 ha), including the Good Samaritan Home.

== Demographics ==
Historical population
| Census | Pop. | Note | %± |
|---|---|---|---|
| 2020 | 114 | | — |
U.S. Decennial Census
