= Maxwell Colony, South Dakota =

- Census-designated place
- Location within South Dakota Location within the United States
- Coordinates: 43°10′57″N 97°38′07″W
- Country: United States
- State: South Dakota
- County: Hutchinson

Area
  - Total: 0.081 sq mi (0.21 km^{2})
  - Land: 0.081 sq mi (0.21 km^{2})
  - Water: 0 sq mi (0.00 km^{2})
- Elevation: 1,194 ft (364 m)

Population (2020)
  - Total: 254
  - Density: 3,070.3/sq mi (1,185.45/km^{2})
- Time zone: UTC-6 (Central (CST))
  - Summer (DST): UTC-5 (CDT)
- ZIP Code: 57059 (Scotland)
- Area code: 605
- FIPS code: 46-41420
- GNIS feature ID: 2813035

Maxwell Colony is a Hutterite colony and census-designated place (CDP) in Hutchinson County, South Dakota, United States. The population was 254 at the 2020 census. It was first listed as a CDP prior to the 2020 census.

It is in the southern part of the county, on the southwest side of the James River. It is 6 miles (10 km) by road southeast of Olivet, the county seat, and the same distance northeast of Scotland.

== Demographics ==
Historical population
Census	Pop.	Note	%±
2020	254		—
U.S. Decennial Census
