= Milltown Hutterite Colony =

- U.S. National Register of Historic Places
- Location within South Dakota Location within the United States
- Location: On the James River, near Milltown, South Dakota
- Coordinates: 43°25′42″N 97°47′37″W
- Area: 14 acres (5.7 ha)
- Built: 1916
- MPS: Historic Hutterite Colonies TR
- NRHP reference No.: 82004658
- Added to NRHP: June 30, 1982

The Milltown Hutterite Colony, located on the James River near Milltown, South Dakota, was listed on the National Register of Historic Places in 1982. It was then the Dilger Ranch or Dilger Farm. It was a Hutterite colony during 1886–1907.

The 14 acres (5.7 ha) listing included eight contributing buildings and one other contributing site.

== See also ==
- National Register of Historic Places listings in Hutchinson County, South Dakota
