= Larry Miller (athlete) =

Larry R. Miller (born July 23, 1963) is a track and field athlete who represented Antigua and Barbuda in the Olympic Games.

Miller was born in Dominica and spent most of his childhood in Antigua. He was adopted and spent his high school years in South Dakota at Freeman Academy. He holds the South Dakota all time state record in the 400 meter dash, with a time of 47.8 s.

Miller returned to his home country of Antigua and ran for Antigua and Barbuda at the 1984 Summer Olympics participating in the 200 m, 4 × 100 metres relay, and 4 × 400 metres relay. He again represented his home country in the 1988 Summer Olympics running in the 4 × 100 metres relay and 4 × 400 metres relay. He also competed in the Pan American Games.

Miller received a full athletic and academic scholarship to Yale University. He double majored in economics and political science. Miller was the captain of his Yale Track team and won three outdoor and one indoor Heptagonal titles, while breaking a record for the 600 yards. He has several undefeated track records all over the United States.
