= Dimock, South Dakota =

- Town
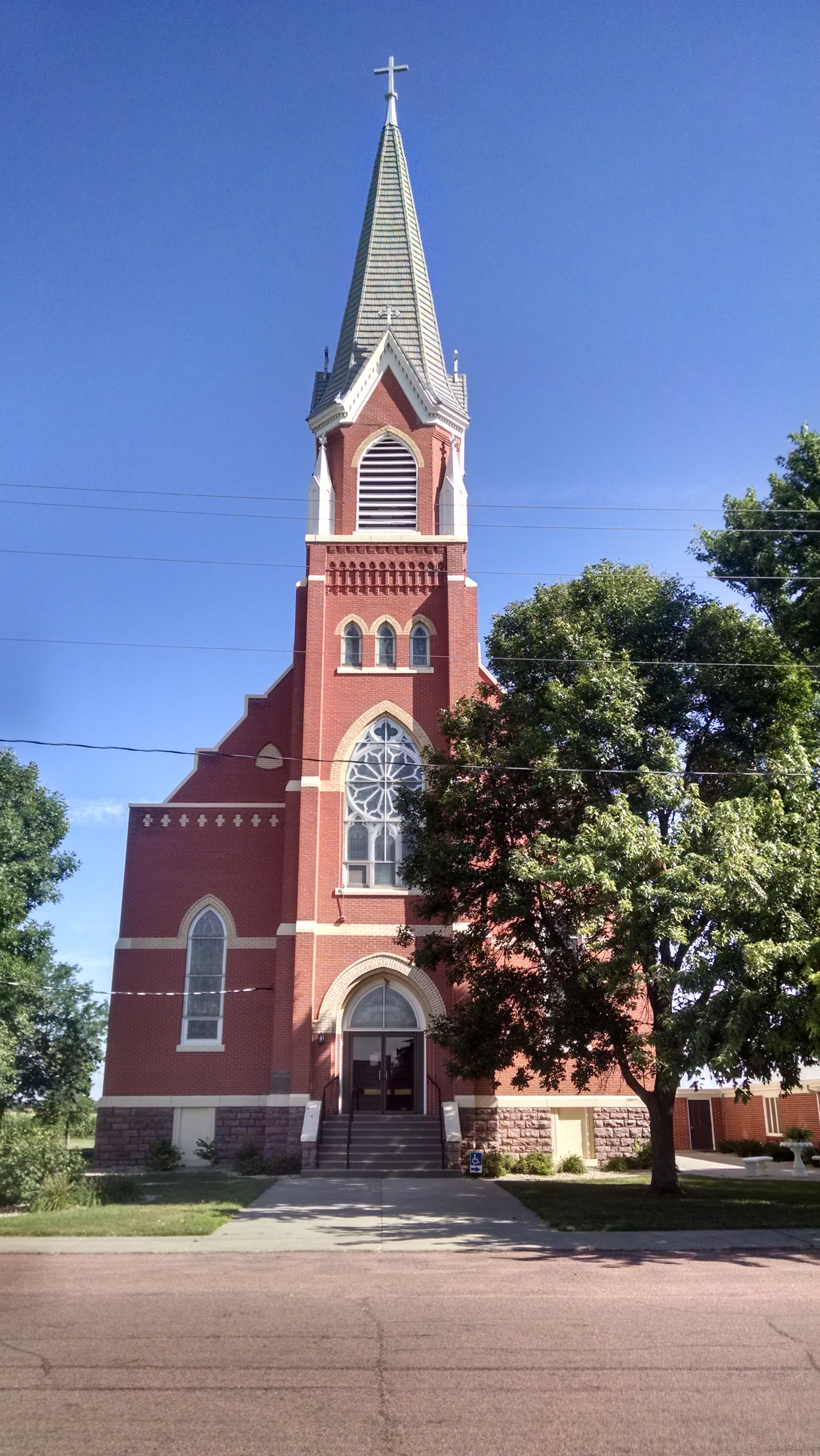
- Saints Peter & Paul Catholic Church on 1st Street in Dimock, SD.

- Location in Hutchinson County and the state of South Dakota
- Coordinates: 43°28′41″N 97°59′38″W
- Country: United States
- State: South Dakota
- County: Hutchinson

Area
  - Total: 0.17 sq mi (0.44 km^{2})
  - Land: 0.17 sq mi (0.44 km^{2})
  - Water: 0 sq mi (0.00 km^{2})
- Elevation: 1,375 ft (419 m)

Population (2020)
  - Total: 137
  - Density: 797.8/sq mi (308.05/km^{2})
- Time zone: UTC-6 (Central (CST))
  - Summer (DST): UTC-5 (CDT)
- ZIP code: 57331
- Area code: 605
- FIPS code: 46-16620
- GNIS feature ID: 1267354

Dimock is a town in Hutchinson County, South Dakota, United States. The population was 137 at the 2020 census.

The first farmer settlers, a group of Wisconsin Germans, arrived in 1879. Dimock was laid out in 1910, and named for a railroad surveyor. The town's ornate Saints Peter and Paul Catholic Church was built in 1909.

== Geography ==
According to the United States Census Bureau, the town has a total area of 0.16 square miles (0.41 km^{2}), all land.

== Demographics ==
Historical population
Census	Pop.	Note	%±
1970	167		—
1980	140		−16.2%
1990	157		12.1%
2000	151		−3.8%
2010	125		−17.2%
2020	137		9.6%
U.S. Decennial Census

=== 2010 census ===
As of the census of 2010, there were 125 people, 55 households, and 38 families residing in the town. The population density was 781.3 inhabitants per square mile (301.7/km^{2}). There were 61 housing units at an average density of 381.3 per square mile (147.2/km^{2}). The racial makeup of the town was 100.0% White. Hispanic or Latino of any race were 0.8% of the population.

There were 55 households, of which 23.6% had children under the age of 18 living with them, 63.6% were married couples living together, 3.6% had a female householder with no husband present, 1.8% had a male householder with no wife present, and 30.9% were non-families. 29.1% of all households were made up of individuals, and 18.1% had someone living alone who was 65 years of age or older. The average household size was 2.27 and the average family size was 2.76.

The median age in the town was 48.5 years. 23.2% of residents were under the age of 18; 3.2% were between the ages of 18 and 24; 20.8% were from 25 to 44; 25.6% were from 45 to 64; and 27.2% were 65 years of age or older. The gender makeup of the town was 51.2% male and 48.8% female.

=== 2000 census ===
As of the census of 2000, there were 151 people, 62 households, and 46 families residing in the town. The population density was 1,014.0 inhabitants per square mile (391.5/km^{2}). There were 63 housing units at an average density of 423.1 per square mile (163.4/km^{2}). The racial makeup of the town was 100.00% White.

There were 62 households, out of which 25.8% had children under the age of 18 living with them, 71.0% were married couples living together, 1.6% had a female householder with no husband present, and 24.2% were non-families. 24.2% of all households were made up of individuals, and 19.4% had someone living alone who was 65 years of age or older. The average household size was 2.44 and the average family size was 2.87.

In the town, the population was spread out, with 23.8% under the age of 18, 6.6% from 18 to 24, 21.9% from 25 to 44, 21.9% from 45 to 64, and 25.8% who were 65 years of age or older. The median age was 44 years. For every 100 females, there were 91.1 males. For every 100 females age 18 and over, there were 98.3 males.

The median income for a household in the town was $42,188, and the median income for a family was $43,125. Males had a median income of $26,875 versus $16,667 for females. The per capita income for the town was $18,458. About 4.0% of families and 2.7% of the population were below the poverty line, including none of those under the age of 18 and 9.5% of those 65 and older.
