= United Brethren Church in Christ =

Historic church in South Dakota, United States

- U.S. National Register of Historic Places
- Location within South Dakota Location within the United States
- Location: Lots 5 through 10 in Block 20, Milltown, South Dakota
- Coordinates: 43°25′37″N 97°48′12″W
- Area: 1.5 acres (0.61 ha)
- Built: 1880
- NRHP reference No.: 07000531
- Added to NRHP: June 8, 2007

United Brethren Church in Christ is a historic church on Lots 5 through 10 in Block 20 in Milltown, South Dakota. It has also been known as Milltown United Brethren in Christ Church. It was built in 1880 and was added to the National Register in 2007.

It was deemed notable "as it represents the distinctive characteristics of the small rural churches that were constructed in South Dakota during the late 19th century and early 20th century."

The church had a small bell tower which was removed for structural reasons.

== See also ==
- United Brethren Church (Union County, South Dakota), also NRHP-listed
