= Rapid City Post =

Weekly tabloid and online newspaper in Rapid City, South Dakota

The Rapid City Post
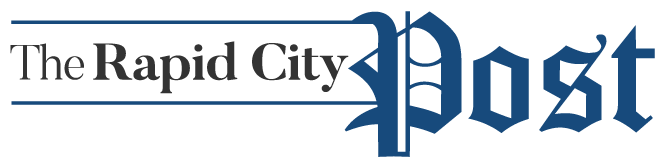
- Type: Weekly newspaper
- Format: Tabloid and Online newspaper
- Owner: The HomeSlice Group
- Publisher: Dean Kinney
- Managing editor: Chris Hornick
- Founded: 25 March 2025
- Language: English
- Headquarters: 333 West Blvd; Rapid City, South Dakota 57701; USA
- Website: rapidcitypost.com

The Rapid City Post is a weekly tabloid and online newspaper based in Rapid City, South Dakota.

Initially launched as a free digital-only publication in March 2025 by The HomeSlice Group, the paper expanded its operations in January 2026 to include a weekly printed weekend edition in tabloid format. It covers news across the Black Hills region, the Sturgis Motorcycle Rally, and South Dakota state news. It is a member of the South Dakota NewsMedia Association.

== See also ==
- List of newspapers in South Dakota
