= The Freeman =

The Freeman may refer to:

- The Freeman (magazine), a digital magazine published by the Foundation for Economic Education
- The Freeman (newspaper), a newspaper in Cebu City, Philippines
- The Freeman's Journal (Sydney), a newspaper in Australia
- The Freeman, a British Baptist newspaper established in 1855 and later renamed The Baptist Times
- The Waukesha Freeman, a newspaper in Waukesha County, Wisconsin, United States

== See also ==
- Freeman (disambiguation)
- The Freed Man, 1989 album by Sebadoh
- Freeman's Journal, a newspaper in Ireland
- Indianapolis Freeman, a newspaper published in Indianapolis, Indiana, United States, in the late 19th century
