= First National Bank, Freeman =

- Freeman Junior College
- U.S. National Register of Historic Places
- Location within South Dakota Location within the United States
- Location: 394 S. Main St., Freeman, South Dakota
- Coordinates: 43°21′06″N 97°26′14″W
- Built: 1906
- NRHP reference No.: 15000564
- Added to NRHP: September 1, 2015

The First National Bank, Freeman, located at 394 S. Main St. in Freeman, South Dakota, was organized in 1902. Its building was built in 1906 and was eventually listed on the National Register of Historic Places in 2015.

It was noted "for its local significance in the area of commerce as an example of small-town banking industry in South Dakota. The bank remained open to serve its town and surrounding agricultural community through the Great War boom, the subsequent agricultural recession, the Great Depression and a bank robbery. The corner location and design of the two-story brick building are indicative of the status the bank had in the community."
