= Freman =

Freman may refer to:

- Freman Hendrix, American politician
- Freman River, river in Romania
- Freman College, school in Hertfordshire, England

== See also ==
- Freeman (disambiguation)
- Fremen, fictional people in the Dune franchise
