= Freeman High School =

Freeman High School may refer to:

- Douglas S. Freeman High School, in Virginia
- Freeman High School (Rockford, Washington)

== See also ==
- Freeman Academy, in South Dakota
