= Kost Farm Barn =

- U.S. National Register of Historic Places
- Location within South Dakota Location within the United States
- Location: 42247 280th St., Olivet, South Dakota
- Coordinates: 43°18′00″N 97°44′43″W
- Area: less than one acre
- Built: 1917
- Architectural style: Gothic Barn
- NRHP reference No.: 03000766
- Added to NRHP: August 14, 2003

The Kost Farm Barn in Olivet, South Dakota is a Gothic-arch barn which was built in 1917. It was listed on the National Register of Historic Places in 2003.

It is a two-story wood barn with clapboard siding, on a concrete foundation. It has a gothic arch roof over its main section. There is also a one-story lean-to section on the north side.

It was deemed notable as "an excellent example of the Gothic Arch Barn in South Dakota."
