= Gottlieb Schmitt House =

Historic house in South Dakota, United States

- U.S. National Register of Historic Places
- Location within South Dakota Location within the United States
- Location: 150 W. Poplar, Menno, South Dakota
- Coordinates: 43°14′17″N 97°34′41″W
- Area: less than one acre
- Built: 1888
- Built by: Schmitt, Gottlieb
- NRHP reference No.: 86003011
- Added to NRHP: November 6, 1986

The Gottlieb Schmitt House, located at 150 W. Poplar in Menno, South Dakota, was listed on the National Register of Historic Places in 1986.

It is a 40 by 26 feet (12.2 m × 7.9 m) two-story frame house built in 1888 around an original house that was built earlier. It is significant for association with early German-Russian immigrant Gottlieb Schmitt, one of the first settlers in Menno.

In 2018 it is the Menno Heritage Museum; it was purchased in 1983 by the Menno Historical Society.
