= Frank M. Ziebach =

American politician

Frank M. Ziebach (also known by his full name of Francis Marion Ziebach) was a political figure in the Dakota Territory during the territorial period from 1861 to 1889. He was a pioneer newspaperman, founding a number of newspapers in the Iowa and Dakota Territories, including the Yankton Weekly Dakotan (also referred to as the Weekly Dakotian) in 1861, which is still published today as the Yankton Daily Press & Dakotan. He was known as the "squatter governor" of the Dakota Territory. Ziebach County, South Dakota was created in 1911, and is named for him.

Frank M. Ziebach was born in 1830 in Pennsylvania, and died in 1929 in Yankton, South Dakota at the age of 98. His life spanned the period from the presidency of Andrew Jackson (1829–37) to that of Herbert Hoover (1929–33).

== Early life, marriage and children ==
Frank M. Ziebach was born On November 23, 1830 in Union County, Pennsylvania, near Lewisburg, Pennsylvania. When a boy he entered the printer's trade. In 1853 he went to Madison, Wisconsin, but in 1855 returned home and founded the "Lewisburg Argus".

He married Elizabeth Fisher, of Danville, Pa, and over the course of their married life they had four sons and two daughters.

== Iowa 1856 to 1862 ==
Frank M. Ziebach moved from Pennsylvania to Iowa and in August 1856 he began publication of the Western Independent with J. N. Cummings in Sargeants Bluff, eight miles south of Sioux City, Iowa. In 1858 Frank bought out his partner, and moved the equipment to Sioux City, where he commenced publication on July 22, 1858, as the weekly Sioux City Register. The Register declared itself to be a "Democratic" newspaper. In 1859, Frank sold an interest to William Freney and the Register was consolidated with the Sioux City Eagle. The partnership of Ziebach and Freney continued to publish the Register until 1862, but in 1861 Frank transferred his interests to Yankton, South Dakota.

== The Yankton Weekly Dakotian newspaper ==
In 1861, Frank M. Ziebach freighted his printing outfit from Sioux City, Iowa to Yankton by team and wagon. He and his partner from Sioux City, William Freney, formed the Dakotian Printing Company in Yankton, and printed the first edition of the Weekly Dakotian at Yankton on June 6, 1861. Frank Ziebach was the editor and did a good portion of the practical work besides. He was a master printer and a good journalist.

The papers Ziebach had formed in Iowa were self-proclaimed Democrat newspapers and in early editions the Yankton Weekly Dakotian similarly proclaimed itself to be a "Douglas Democrat" newspaper. However, after the elections brought the Republicans to power in the territorial legislature in the fall of 1861, the newspaper switched sides. The newspaper became inactive for a short period, during which Ziebach sold the newspaper to J.C. Trask in March 1862. The Dakotian now re-emerged and declared itself a Republican newspaper, and the Dakotian Printing Company was rewarded by becoming the first "Public Printer" in Dakota, doing the printing for the first Legislative Assembly.

After the first legislative session the Dakotian was sold to George W. Kingsbury, and Frank M. Zieback subsequently rejoined the newspaper as a partner of Kingsbury. Since the Dakotian had been a declared Democrat newspaper when published by Frank Ziebach in 1861, but now had switched its allegiance to the Republicans in 1862, when Ziebach rejoined Kingsbury in the newspaper business "political party prudence" dictated that Ziebach be a silent partner and Kingsbury, a Republican, be the official editor and manager of the paper. These political machinations had their reward, and during the second session of the territorial legislature Ziebach and Kingsbury retained the position of "Public Printer".

After 1863, the paper passed into the sole possession of Kingsbury. Yankton was the territorial capitol of the Dakota Territory from 1861 until 1883 (when the capitol was moved to Bismarck) and during this period the Dakotian grew swiftly with its reporting of the early political wars of Dakota Territory. The paper passed through a number of different ownership entities, and in the following decades other area newspapers become consolidated with the Dakotian so that it eventually became known as the Press and Dakotan and is still published under that name today in Yankton, South Dakota.

There is a debate about the "first newspaper" in the Dakota Territory. On March 2, 1861, Congress passed the Organic Act that brought the Dakota Territory into being, with Yankton as its capitol. The Weekly Dakotian was the first newspaper that was published in the Dakota Territory after the passage of the organic act. However it was the second newspaper in the area that became South Dakota. The first newspaper in what is now South Dakota was the Dakota Democrat published in Sioux Falls for about four years starting in 1858.

== The Yankton Dakota Militia in the 1862 Indian uprising ==
In August 1862 raiding Sioux killed Judge Amedon and his son near Sioux Falls, and shortly thereafter Yankton got news of the massacre in Minnesota by Little Crow. Settlers panicked and came pouring into Yankton with their goods and livestock. A sod stockade was thrown up around the printing offices of the Dakotian. The stockaded newspaper building became known as "Fort Yankton". The governor called for militia volunteers, and four hundred citizens responded. Frank M. Ziebach was elected Captain of Company A of the Dakota Militia, and George W. Kingsbury, the co-editor at the Dakotian became the company orderly sergeant. Frank M. Ziebach became known by the tongue in cheek title of Commander in Chief of the Army at Fort Yankton. Although for Yankton there was almost no fighting (excepting a short clash in the late fall on the outskirts of Sioux Falls), historical memory now recalls dashing images from "the exciting and perilous weeks of the Indian outbreak of 1862, when Yankton was besieged."

== Public offices in Iowa and the Dakota Territory, 1868 to 1889 ==
Frank M. Ziebach went to Dubuque Iowa in 1863 and purchased an interest in the Dubuque Herald. He returned to Sioux City, Iowa in 1868 and in the fall of that year was appointed register of the United States land office at Sioux City. He was mayor of Sioux City for two terms 1868–69 and 1869–70.

He returned to Yankton in 1870, where he again became engaged in the newspaper business. In 1873, he was elected to the office as Superintendent of Schools, but since he did not qualify, another was appointed to fill his place. He was elected mayor of Yankton serving for three terms from 1876 through 1880.

He served as a member of the territorial legislature 1877–78 and 1883–84. When in the 1877–78 territorial legislature, Mr. Ziebach resided in Yankton, and represented Yankton County. When he was in the 1883–84 territorial legislature he resided in Scotland and represented Bon Homme County.

He was a delegate to the South Dakota state constitutional convention, in 1883. He served as a member of first Yankton's Board of Education, formed in 1875. He has also held other minor offices in city and territorial government.

From 1861 to 1889, Dakota Territory elected a single non-voting Territorial Delegate for a two-year term to the United States House of Representatives. Each party held bi-annual conventions to nominate their candidate for the office. Frank M. Ziebach attended the Democratic Party Territorial Convention in 1874, and in 1882, serving each time on the influential "Committee on Resolutions". Though not chosen as the Democratic candidate for territorial delegate to the U.S. Congress, in each convention he was nominated for the position and received a substantial number of votes.

== The squatter governor ==
Frank M. Ziebach is known to history as the "squatter governor" of Dakota Territory. During the first territorial legislative session he presided as the mock "governor" over an informal caucus of territorial leaders who formed a mock legislature. This caucus was known as the "third house". This incident caused Frank M. Ziebach to be referred to as the "squatter governor" (a squatter being a frontier term for a person who holds land by possessing it, or "squatting" on it, without having any formal legal title to the land). The mock legislature sessions continued sporadically in later years, and Frank M. Ziebach was often called to preside. These mock legislature sessions afforded a good deal of entertainment during the formal legislative sessions. Because he had become known as the "squatter governor" Frank M. Ziebach was popularly referred to as "governor" throughout the latter half of his life.

== Candidate for territorial governor, commissioner of U.S. land office, 1886 – 1889 ==
When Dakota sought admission as a state, an intense debate arose whether the territory would be admitted as the single state of Dakota, or admitted as two states. Politicians became known as "one state" advocates, or "two state" advocates, also called "divisionists". In 1884 Grover Cleveland, a Democrat was elected President of the United States, and in 1886, it fell to him to appoint a governor for the Dakota Territory. Frank M. Ziebach was the overwhelming choice of 90% of the rank and file Democrats in the territory, and extensive petitions were prepared and sent to the President. Frank M. Ziebach went to Washington, and met all the right people, and the Democratic faithful and the candidate confidently expected that he would be appointed governor. However, Frank M. Ziebach was a "two state Democrat" with a reputation as a "pronounced divisionist" and President Cleveland favored a "one state" admission. In 1886 President Cleveland awarded Frank M. Ziebach the consolation prize of appointment as Commissioner of the U.S. Land Office, and in 1887 the President appointed a "one state" candidate as governor. Nevertheless, Frank M. Ziebach continued to advocate for a two state admission, and in 1889 the United States Congress resolved the issue by passage of the Enabling Act of 1889 which admitted North Dakota and South Dakota, along with Montana and Washington.

== Later life, and becoming the namesake for Ziebach County ==
After being appointed Commissioner of the Land Office in 1886, Frank M. Ziebach held that office for a few years, and then continued to hold appointive positions under the federal land office, retiring in 1924. In 1911, Frank M. Ziebach was honored when Ziebach county in South Dakota was created and named for him. In 1919 he was elected a "Life Member" of the South Dakota State Historical Society because, "His long residence in the State... (and) his activities on behalf of the growth and development of South Dakota, from earliest territorial days to the present time make him one of the marked figures on the list of our most prominent citizens."

== Death and burial ==
Frank M. Ziebach died at Wessington Springs, South Dakota on September 20, 1929, at almost 99 years of age. His wife predeceased him, dying at Winner on August 8, 1917. Frank M. Ziebach is buried in the Yankton Cemetery at Yankton, South Dakota.

== Notes ==
In 1862, Frank M. Ziebach was one of the original founders of the Masonic lodge in Yankton.

The Dakota Territory became an organized governmental unit on March 2, 1861. Upon creation, the Dakota Territory included present day North and South Dakota, and much of present-day Montana and Wyoming; by 1868, creation of the new territories of Montana and Wyoming reduced Dakota Territory to the present boundaries of North and South Dakotas. Increasing population caused the Dakota Territory to be divided in half, and a bill for statehood for North Dakota and South Dakota (as well as Montana and Washington) titled the Enabling Act of 1889 was passed on February 22, 1889.

On February 1, 1911, Governor Vessey signed the bill creating Ziebach County. However, being the namesake of Ziebach County has become a rather dubious honor, as the county consistently retained the title of "poorest county in America" for a number of years, and today Ziebach County is the fourth poorest county in the United States.

If the Dakota Territory had been admitted as one state in 1889, instead of two states (North and South Dakota), its land area (383,177 km2) would have made it the fourth largest state, after Alaska, Texas and California, just edging out Montana (381,176 km2).

Before Frank M. Ziebach became known as the "squatter governor" of the mock territorial session in 1862, there were other squatter governments. Before the 1861 founding of the Dakota Territory, there were extralegal "squatter governments" devised by speculators from Dubuque and St. Paul who combined to start a political movement at present-day Sioux Falls and began agitating for the creation of a new Dakota territory. Prior to this time, any new non-slave territory was opposed by the southern members of Congress unless offset by a new slave territory. However, in 1861 the prospect of secession by southern states after the 1860 presidential election removed this obstacle to political change. Lame duck Democrats in Congress and defeated president James Buchanan claimed a final legacy by extending legal authority to create territorial governments. Thus, these early unofficial "squatter governments" gave a semblance of order, before organized government was formed, and helped provide the impetus to create the Dakota Territory.

== See also ==
- Ziebach County, South Dakota
