= J. W. Ulmer House =

- U.S. National Register of Historic Places
- Location: 611 5th St., Menno, South Dakota
- Coordinates: 43°14′05″N 97°34′40″W
- Area: 1 acre (0.40 ha)
- Built: 1914
- Architectural style: Queen Anne
- NRHP reference No.: 82004657
- Added to NRHP: June 17, 1982

The J. W. Ulmer House, at 611 5th St. in Menno, South Dakota, was built in 1914. It was listed on the National Register of Historic Places in 1982.

It has also been known as the Ulmer-Hertz House.

It is a two-story frame clapboard house, with a broad hipped roof which flares out at the eaves and is crowned by a finial. It is Queen Anne in style.

It was built in 1914 for J.W. Ulmer, then president of the Menno bank. Ulmer, born in southern Russia in 1862, had immigrated with his German-Russian parents in 1874.
