= United Brethren =

United Brethren may refer to:

== Denominations ==
- Apostolic United Brethren, a Mormon fundamentalist group headquartered in Bluffdale, Utah
- Church of the United Brethren in Christ, an evangelical Christian denomination based in Huntington, Indiana, organized formally in 1800 and including some but not all churches using United Brethren term previously
- Church of the United Brethren in Christ (New Constitution), a historical part of the Church of the United Brethren which eventually became part of the Evangelical United Brethren Church
- Church of the United Brethren in Christ (Old Constitution), a historical part of the Church of the United Brethren
- Evangelical United Brethren Church, an American Protestant group formed in 1946
- Unitas Fratrum ("United Brethren"), the official name of the Moravian Church
- United Brethren (England), a group of former Primitive Methodists who converted to Mormonism en masse in 1840

== Specific church buildings ==
- United Brethren in Christ (Ohio), a historic building near Cincinnati, Ohio
- United Brethren Publishing House, a historic building in Dayton, Ohio, also known as Centre City Building
