= Freeman Courier =

Newspaper in Freeman, South Dakota

- Type: Weekly newspaper
- Founder: R.F. Osborn
- Publisher: Jeremy Waltner
- Founded: 1901
- Language: English
- Headquarters: 308 S. Main; Freeman, SD 57029
- Circulation: 1,511 (as of 2015)
- Website: freemansd.com

The Freeman Courier is a weekly newspaper serving the larger Freeman, South Dakota community. Located on the eastern edge of Hutchinson County, the Courier's primary readership includes eastern Hutchinson, western Turner, and southern McCook counties.

The Courier is a member of the South Dakota Newspaper Association, the National Newspaper Association, and the International Society of Weekly Newspaper Editors.

== History ==
In April 1901, F.D. Simmons, publisher of the Parkston Courier, sold the printing plant of the Parkston Advance, which he had recently acquired, to R.F. Osborn, who moved it to Freeman to start the Freeman Courier. Osborn soon grew ill and left town. He planned to live in Utah for a year and leased the paper to C.A. Williams, who later acquired the Courier and in 1902 sold it to Jacob J. Mendel and J.A. Hofer.

Mendel was a teacher and farmer who claimed he was talked into buying the paper. He published it for nearly 60 years until 1960 when he sold it to brothers Glenn and Vernon Gering. Mendel died shortly after the sale. In 1973, Timothy L. Waltner started work at the paper and in 1984 he purchased it from the Gerings. He retired in 2016 and was succeeded as publisher by his son, Jeremy Waltner. That same year, T.L. Waltner was inducted into the South Dakota Newspaper Hall of Fame.
