= Salem Church Parsonage =

- U.S. National Register of Historic Places
- Location within South Dakota Location within the United States
- Location: 206 S. High St., Menno, South Dakota
- Coordinates: 43°14′19″N 97°34′35″W
- Area: less than one acre
- Built: c.1913
- Architectural style: Queen Anne
- NRHP reference No.: 01000392
- Added to NRHP: April 19, 2001

The Salem Church Parsonage is a historic church parsonage at 206 S. High Street in Menno, South Dakota. It was built in about 1913 and was added to the National Register in 2001.

It is a two-story, clapboard-sided house on a concrete and stucco foundation. Its design has elements of Queen Anne architecture including an irregularly-shaped steeply pitched roof.

== See also ==
- Salem Church (disambiguation)
