= United Brethren Church (Union County, South Dakota) =

Historic church in South Dakota, United States

- U.S. National Register of Historic Places
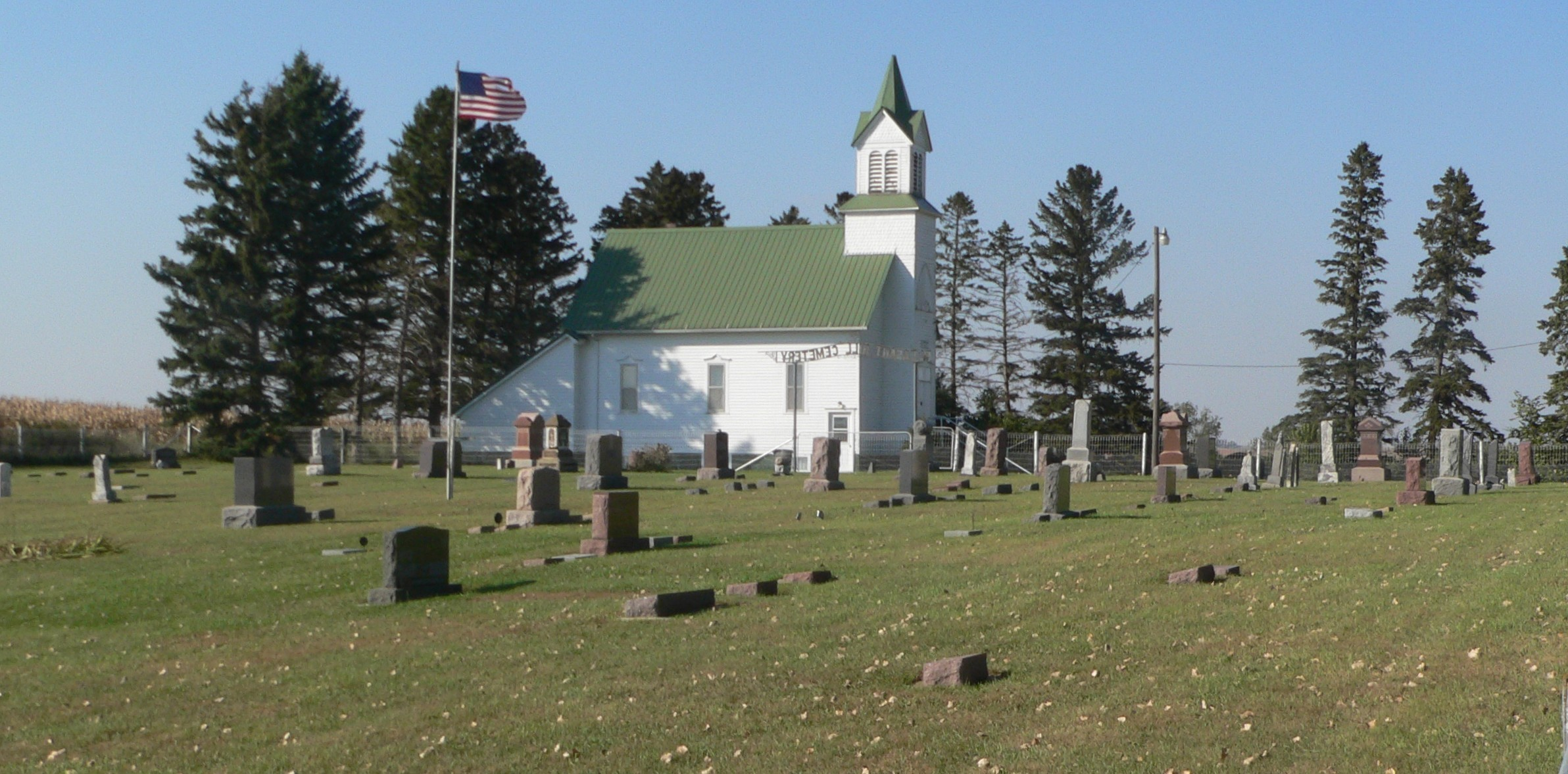
- View from the south
- Nearest city: West Akron, South Dakota
- Coordinates: 42.874331°N 96.687829°W
- Area: 2.5 acres (1.0 ha)
- Built: 1905
- Built by: Matson and Buum
- Architectural style: Late Gothic Revival
- NRHP reference No.: 01000091
- Added to NRHP: February 9, 2001

United Brethren Church, also known as Pleasant Hill Chapel, is a church in Union County, South Dakota. It was built in 1905 and was added to the National Register of Historic Places in 2001.

It is located on a country road in Spink Township, about 4.5 miles (7.2 km) northeast of the community of Spink.

It is a one-and-a-half-story gable-front clapboard building built on a clay tile foundation. A steeple is centered in its front facade. It was built by carpenters Matson and Buum.

== See also ==
- United Brethren Church in Christ, built 1880 in Hutchinson County, South Dakota), also NRHP-listed
