= Yankton Daily Press & Dakotan =

Newspaper in Yankton, South Dakota

- Type: Daily newspaper
- Founder(s): Frank M. Ziebach; William Freney
- Publisher: Gary Wood
- Managing editor: Kelly Hertz
- General manager: Beth Rye
- Founded: 1861 (as The Weekly Dakotian)
- Language: English
- Headquarters: 319 Walnut; Yankton, SD 57078
- OCLC number: 13417490
- Website: yankton.net

The Yankton Daily Press & Dakotan is a newspaper in Yankton, South Dakota. It is the first daily paper published in the Dakota Territory and oldest continuously published paper in South Dakota.

== History ==
=== Origins ===
On June 6, 1861, the first edition of The Weekly Dakotian was published. It was created by Frank M. Ziebach, William Freney and John Blair Smith Todd under the firm name The Dakotian Publishing Company. The printing plant was housed in a log cabin on Broadway between Second and Third streets. The press and other equipment came from a defunct paper in Sioux City, Iowa, called The Sioux City Eagle, which was acquired by a rival paper called the Sioux City Register which Ziebach established. It took two wagons, one drawn by horses and the other by ox, four days to move the material to Yankton.

George W. Kingsbury in 1915.

Printers Ziebach and Freney started the paper to obtain government printing contracts from the newly formed Dakota Territory. Todd was a politician who was involved in the paper so he could use it to help promote his congressional campaign. However, territorial secretary John Hutchinson contracted Josiah C. Trask, of Kansas, to act as official printer for the first territorial legislature. So Ziebach sold his interest in the paper to Trask in order for his plant to get the work. After the session ended, Trask sold his stake to Ziebach and George W. Kingsbury. Previously Ziebach had exchanged his stake in the Register for Freney's stake in the Dakotian and acquired Todd's interest in the Dakota paper as well. Moving forward, Ziebach acted as a silent partner, leaving Kingsbury as acting manager and editor.

On June 21, 1864, the first edition of The Dakota Union was published. On Nov. 19, 1864, the Union merged with the Dakotaian to form The Union & Dakotaian. In September 1869, Kingsbury sold the paper to James S. Foster and Charles H. McIntyre. On Aug. 10, 1870, The Yankton Press was first published, founded by Kingsbury with George H. Hand as editor. In 1873, the two papers merged to form the Press & Dakotan. Wheeler S. Bowen then joined the firm. On April 26, 1875, the paper was expanded from a weekly into a daily. In 1902, the Kingsbury and Bowen sold the Press & Dakotan to David E. Lloyd, previously associated with the Yankton Gazette.

=== Lusk and Monfore family ownership ===
In 1903, Willard C. Lusk, owner of the Yankton Gazette, purchased the Press & Dakotan from Lloyd and merged the two under the older masthead. In 1922, Fred H. Monfore succeeded Mrs. Ida M. Rees as managing editor. In 1925, Kingsbury, who was known as the "Father of south Dakota Journalism," died at age 88, and in 1935 he was posthumously inducted into the South Dakota Newspaper Hall of Fame. In 1937, W.C. Lusk's wife died. At that time Lusk was company president, his son Robert D. Lusk managed the Huronite Huron and son E.F. Lusk managed the Rapid City Daily Journal. In 1940, W.C. Lusk died. R.D. Lusk was then elected president of the business, Lusk-Mitchell Newspapers, Inc.

In 1944, Fred H. Monfore bought a controlling interest in the company, thus acquiring ownership of the Press & Dakotan. In 1945, staff at the paper's printing plant voted 4 to 3 to stage a walk out after management declined to agree to a closed-shop agreement with the International Typographical Union. The strike ended after a week when workers agreed to accept a contract. In 1961, F.H. Monfore died, and his son Colin D. Monfore took over the business. In 1965, F.H. Monfore was inducted into the state newspaper hall of fame. In 1972, C.D. Monfore was named president of the South Dakota Press Association.

=== Corporate ownership and present ===
In 1978, Stauffer Communications, which owned the nearby Brookings Register, acquired the Press & Dakotan, becoming the company's 20th tittle. At that time, the paper had a circulation of 10,500. In 1994, Morris Communications agreed to buy Stauffer Communications. The deal was completed a year later. In 2007, Morris was purchased by GateHouse Media for $115 million. In 2008, a group of local investors led by Gary Wood purchased the Press & Dakotan.
