= Freeman (given name) =

Freeman is a given name. Notable people with the name include:

- Freeman Asmundson (born 1943) Canadian ice hockey player
- Freeman Barr (born 1973), Bahamian boxers
- Freeman Bosley Jr. (born 1954), American politician
- Freeman W. Compton (1824–1893), justice of the Arkansas Supreme Court
- Freeman Wills Crofts (1879–1957), Irish writer
- Freeman Davis or Brother Bones (1902–1974), American recording artist
- Freeman Davis (soldier) (1842–1899), American soldier
- Freeman Dyson (1923–2020) English-born American theoretical physicist and mathematician
- Freeman Fitzgerald (1891–?), American football player
- Freeman Freeman-Thomas, 1st Marquess of Willingdon (1866–1941), British politician
- Freeman Gosden (1899–1982), American radio comedian, actor and pioneer
- Freeman A. Hrabowski III (born 1950) African American educator, advocate, and mathematician
- Freeman King (1943–2002), American comedian
- Freeman Knowles (1846–1910) American politician and publisher
- Freeman Lord (1842–1917), American politician
- Freeman McNeil (born 1959), American football player
- Freeman Osonuga (born 1984), Nigerian physician and humanitarian
- Freeman Patterson (born 1937), Canadian nature photographer and writer
- Freeman Ransom (1880–1947), American lawyer and businessman
- Freeman G. Teed (1851–1916), American politician
- Freeman Thomas (born 1957), American automobile and industrial designer
- Freeman Thorpe (1844–1922), American painter
- Freeman Tilden (1883–1980), American environmentalist
- Freeman Walker (1780–1827), American politician
- Freeman White (born 1943), American football player
- Freeman White (politician) (born 1946), Canadian politician
- Freeman Williams (1956–2022), American basketball player

== Fictional Characters ==
- Freeman Lowell, protagonist of the film Silent Running
- Freeman (Fatal Fury), a character in the Garou: Mark of the Wolves video game

== See also ==
- Freman Hendrix (born 1950), American politician
