= Kaylor, South Dakota =

- Census-designated place
- Location in Hutchinson County and the state of South Dakota
- Coordinates: 43°11′33″N 97°50′26″W
- Country: United States
- State: South Dakota
- Counties: Hutchinson

Area
  - Total: 0.69 sq mi (1.8 km^{2})
  - Land: 0.66 sq mi (1.7 km^{2})
  - Water: 0.039 sq mi (0.1 km^{2})
- Elevation: 1,398 ft (426 m)

Population (2020)
  - Total: 30
  - Density: 71/sq mi (27.6/km^{2})
- Time zone: UTC-6 (Central (CST))
  - Summer (DST): UTC-5 (CDT)
- ZIP code: 57354
- GNIS feature ID: 2393068

Kaylor is a census-designated place (CDP) in Hutchinson County, South Dakota, United States. The population was 30 at the 2020 census.

The community's name is a corruption of Taylor, the name of a local rancher.

== Geography ==
According to the United States Census Bureau, the CDP has a total area of 0.7 square miles (1.8 km^{2}), of which 0.6 square miles (1.6 km^{2}) is land and 0.04 square miles (0.10 km^{2}) (4.48%) is water.

== Demographics ==
As of the census of 2000, there were 64 people, 29 households, and 18 families residing in the CDP. The population density was 98.7 inhabitants per square mile (38.1/km^{2}). There were 32 housing units at an average density of 49.3 per square mile (19.0/km^{2}). The racial makeup of the CDP was 100.00% White. Hispanic or Latino of any race were 3.12% of the population.

There were 29 households, out of which 24.1% had children under the age of 18 living with them, 44.8% were married couples living together, 10.3% had a female householder with no husband present, and 37.9% were non-families. 34.5% of all households were made up of individuals, and 20.7% had someone living alone who was 65 years of age or older. The average household size was 2.21 and the average family size was 2.83.

In the CDP, the population was spread out, with 18.8% under the age of 18, 7.8% from 18 to 24, 15.6% from 25 to 44, 25.0% from 45 to 64, and 32.8% who were 65 years of age or older. The median age was 48 years. For every 100 females, there were 100.0 males. For every 100 females age 18 and over, there were 100.0 males.

The median income for a household in the CDP was $19,107, and the median income for a family was $31,250. Males had a median income of $21,875 versus $31,250 for females. The per capita income for the CDP was $18,568. There were 25.0% of families and 20.0% of the population living below the poverty line, including 20.0% of under eighteens and none of those over 64.
