= Freeman Peak =

Mountain in Idaho, United States

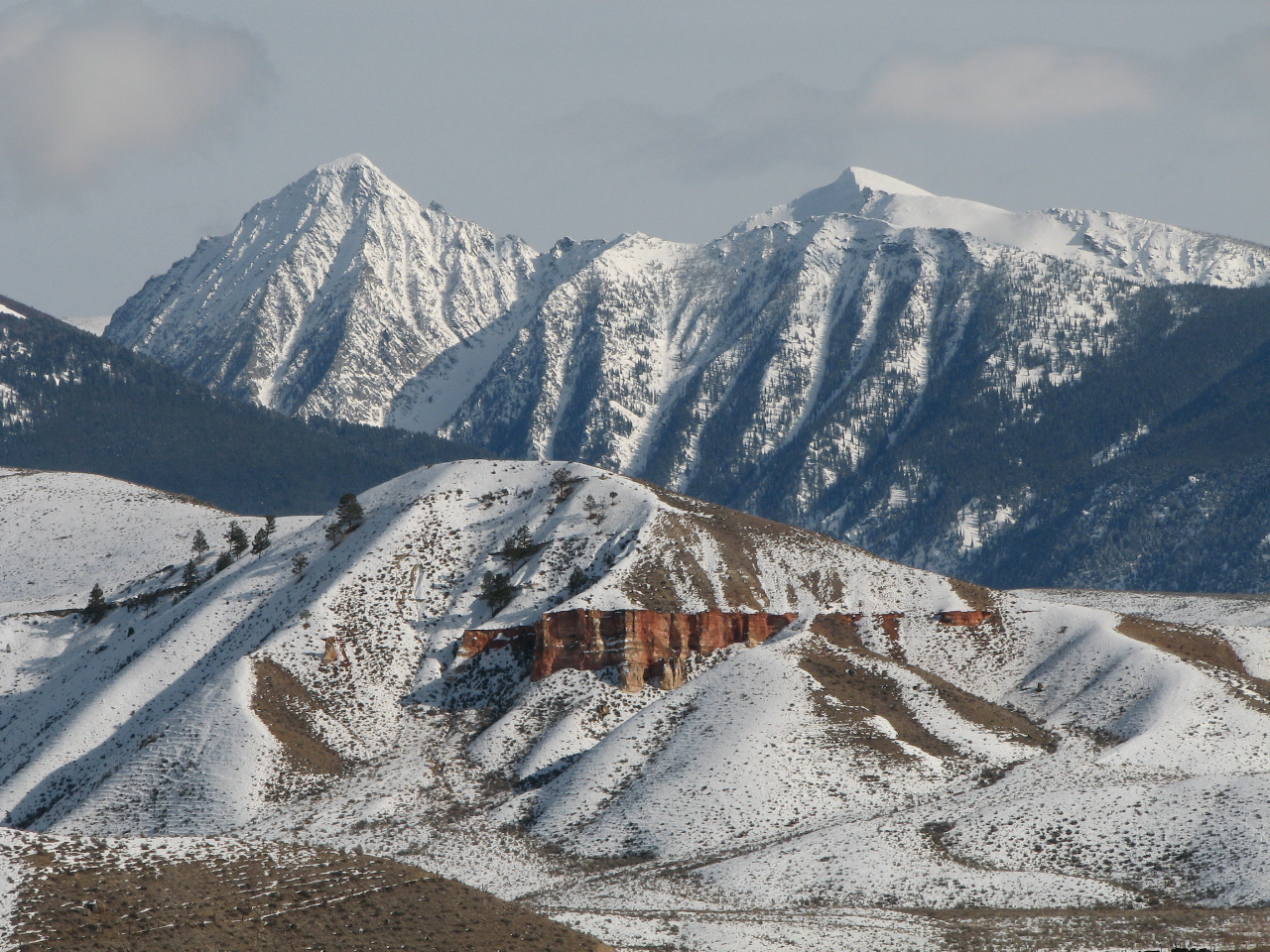
- Freeman Peak (upper left), west aspect (Monument Peak to right in back)

Highest point
- Elevation: 10,273 ft (3,131 m)
- Prominence: 733 ft (223 m)
- Parent peak: Monument Peak (10,323 ft)
- Isolation: 0.81 mi (1.30 km)
- Coordinates: 45°16′28″N 113°42′04″W

Naming
- Etymology: James Freeman

Geography
- Location within Idaho Location within the United States
- Location: Salmon–Challis National Forest
- Country: United States of America
- State: Idaho
- County: Lemhi
- Parent range: Beaverhead Mountains; Bitterroot Range; Rocky Mountains
- Topo map: USGS Homer Youngs Peak

Geology
- Mountain type: Fault block

Climbing
- Easiest route: class 3 scrambling

Freeman Peak is a 10,273-foot elevation (3,131 m) mountain summit located in Lemhi County, Idaho, United States.

== Description ==
Freeman Peak is part of the Beaverhead Mountains which are a subset of the Bitterroot Range. The peak is situated 12 miles northeast of Salmon, Idaho, in the Salmon–Challis National Forest. The summit lies less than one-half mile west of the Continental Divide and the Idaho–Montana border. Precipitation runoff from the mountain drains to the Salmon River via Freeman Creek (north slope) and Kirtley Creek (south slope). Topographic relief is significant as the summit rises 2,500 feet (760 meters) above Freeman Creek in one-half mile. This landform's toponym was officially adopted in 1969 by the United States Board on Geographic Names. The name honors James Freeman, a pioneer rancher of Lemhi County who lived along Freeman Creek. Freeman Creek was also called Oro Cache Creek (Gold Cache) due to the mining in this area.

== Climate ==
Based on the Köppen climate classification, Freeman Peak is located in an alpine subarctic climate zone with long, cold, snowy winters, and cool to warm summers. Winter temperatures can drop below −10 °F with wind chill factors below −30 °F.

== See also ==
- List of mountain peaks of Idaho
