= Clark County Courier =

- Type: Weekly newspaper
- Format: Broadsheet
- Owner: Karli Paulson
- Founder: E.F. Conklin
- Founded: 1880 (as the Clark Pilot)
- Language: English
- Headquarters: 119 1ST Ave E, Clark, South Dakota 57225 United States
- Circulation: 1,880 (as of 2015)
- Website: clarkcountypublishing.com

The Clark County Courier is a weekly newspaper published in Clark, South Dakota, United States. The newspaper serves the counties of Clark and Codington. It is published on Wednesdays.

== History ==
In 1880, E.F. Conklin founded the Clark Pilot, the first newspaper in Clark County. In 1887, it merged with the Clark Review to form the Pilot-Review.

The Clark County Republic dates back to at least December 1892. The paper's printing plant was destroyed in February 1893, and was revived that April by A.E. Goodspeed. In August 1893, H.G. Sasse took on the Republic with help from C.D. Boucher. In April 1895, E.T Miller bought out Sasse.

In March 1899, E.S. Ashley became co-owner will Miller, who a few months later suffered a stroke and became paralyzed. Miller soon died and Ashley acquired full ownership that August. J.W. Sheppard bought the Republic in September 1902, and soon renamed it to the Clark Courier Republic. It was acquired by R.E. Hartman, of the Egan Express, in October 1904, followed by J.K. Coe, formerly of the Hamlin County News, in June 1908, and then Ralph A. Dunham in March 1911. Dunham renamed the paper to the Clark County Courier and in May 1914 sold it to E.A. Silfies in order to concentrate on his legal practice.

In August 1918, Garfield E. Morrison took charge of the Pilot-Review. In November 1923, F.A. Fuller became Courier co-owner. In June 1925, Silfies acquired the Pilot-Review from Morrison and consolidated it into the Courier. In May 1945, B.W. "Jeff" Condit bought the paper from Silfies, and he and his son-in-law Bert Moritz in August 1947 bought out Wayne Peterson. In March 1955, Condit was elected president of the South Dakota Press Association.

Condit died in August 1968. He was inducted into the South Dakota Newspaper Hall of Fame in 1970, and Moritz's inducation followed in 1989. Moritz died in November 2001, and he was succeeded by Bill Krikac, who in June 2007 was elected president of the state newspaper association. In December 2022, Krikac retired and sold the Courier to Karli Paulson.
