= Salem Cemetery =

Salem Cemetery may refer to various cemeteries, all in the United States (shown alphabetically by State):

- Salem Memorial Park, Colma, California
- Old Salem Church and Cemetery, Catonsville, Baltimore County, Maryland
- Salem Street Burying Ground, Medford, Massachusetts
- Harmony Grove Cemetery, Salem, Massachusetts
- Salem Methodist Episcopal Church and Salem Walker Cemetery, Salem, Michigan
- Salem Cemetery, Racine Township, Mower County, Minnesota
- Salem Cemetery, Cape Girardeau, Missouri
- St. John's Episcopal Cemetery, Salem, New Jersey
- Salem Fields Cemetery, Brooklyn, New York
- Salem Welsh Church, Freedom, New York
- Revolutionary War Cemetery, also called the Old Salem Burying Ground, Salem, New York
- Salem Union Church and Cemetery, Maiden, North Carolina
- Salem Cemetery (Winston-Salem, North Carolina)
- Salem Pioneer Cemetery, Salem, Oregon
- City View Cemetery, Salem, Oregon
- Salem Cemetery, Auglaize Township, Allen County, Ohio
