= Salem Methodist Episcopal Church and Salem Walker Cemetery (Northville, Michigan) =

Historic church in Michigan, United States

- U.S. National Register of Historic Places
- Michigan State Historic Site
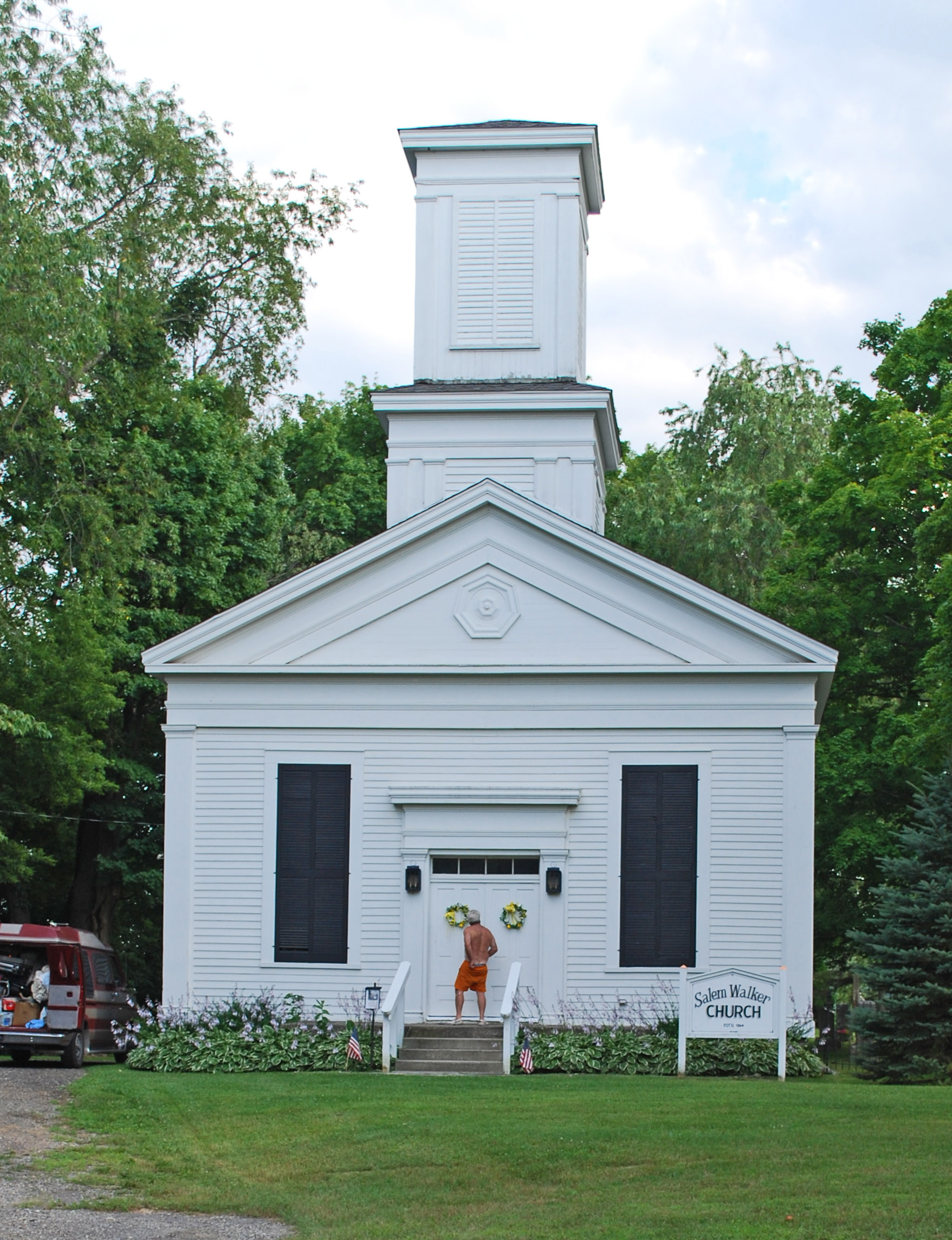

- Location within Michigan Location within the United States
- Interactive map
- Location: 7150 Angle Road; Northville, Michigan
- Coordinates: 42°24′38″N 83°37′25″W
- Area: 2.5 acres (1.0 ha)
- Built: 1864
- Architectural style: Greek Revival
- NRHP reference No.: 92001054

Significant dates
- Added to NRHP: August 18, 1992
- Designated MSHS: July 18, 1991

The Salem Methodist Episcopal Church (also known as the Salem Walker Church) and associated Salem Walker Cemetery is a historic church and cemetery located at 7150 Angle Road, in Salem Township, Michigan with a postal designation of Northville, Michigan. The church and cemetery were added to the National Register in 1992 and designated a Michigan State Historic Site in 1991. The church is significant as one of the least-altered Greek Revival churches existing in the state of Michigan.

== History ==
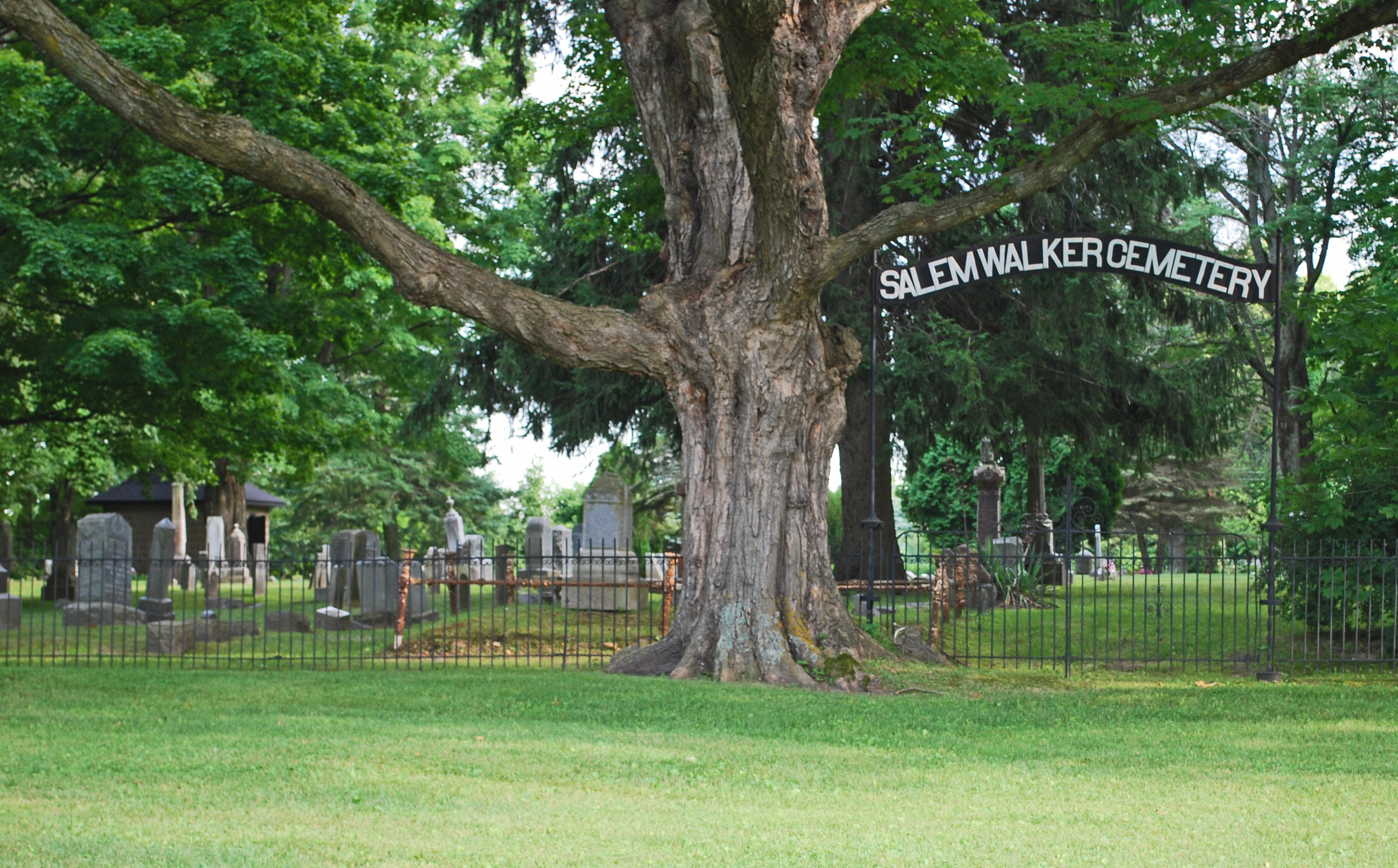
Entrance to Salem Walker Cemetery

The first settlers in Salem Township arrived in 1825. The first burial in the Salem Walker Cemetery took place in 1834. The congregation of the Salem Methodist Episcopal Church formed in the mid-19th century, and met at various places in the township until the 25 members constructed a church adjacent to the cemetery in 1864. The congregation grew to about 60 by 1880, but later declined. Services continued at the church until 1912, after which the congregation abandoned it. In 1908, the Salem Walker Cemetery association founded to care for the cemetery and in 1930, it contacted the Methodist conference about purchasing the church. The next year, the Association purchased the church for $200. The church building is rented for weddings and other gatherings.

In 2012, scenes for the movie The Five-Year Engagement were filmed at the church.

== Description ==
The Salem Walker Church is a single story Greek Revival structure built on a square plan and surmounted by a belfry. The nearby Salem Walker cemetery is enclosed by a 1909 ornamental fence.
