= Old Salem Church and Cemetery =

Historic site in Baltimore County, Maryland, US

- U.S. National Register of Historic Places
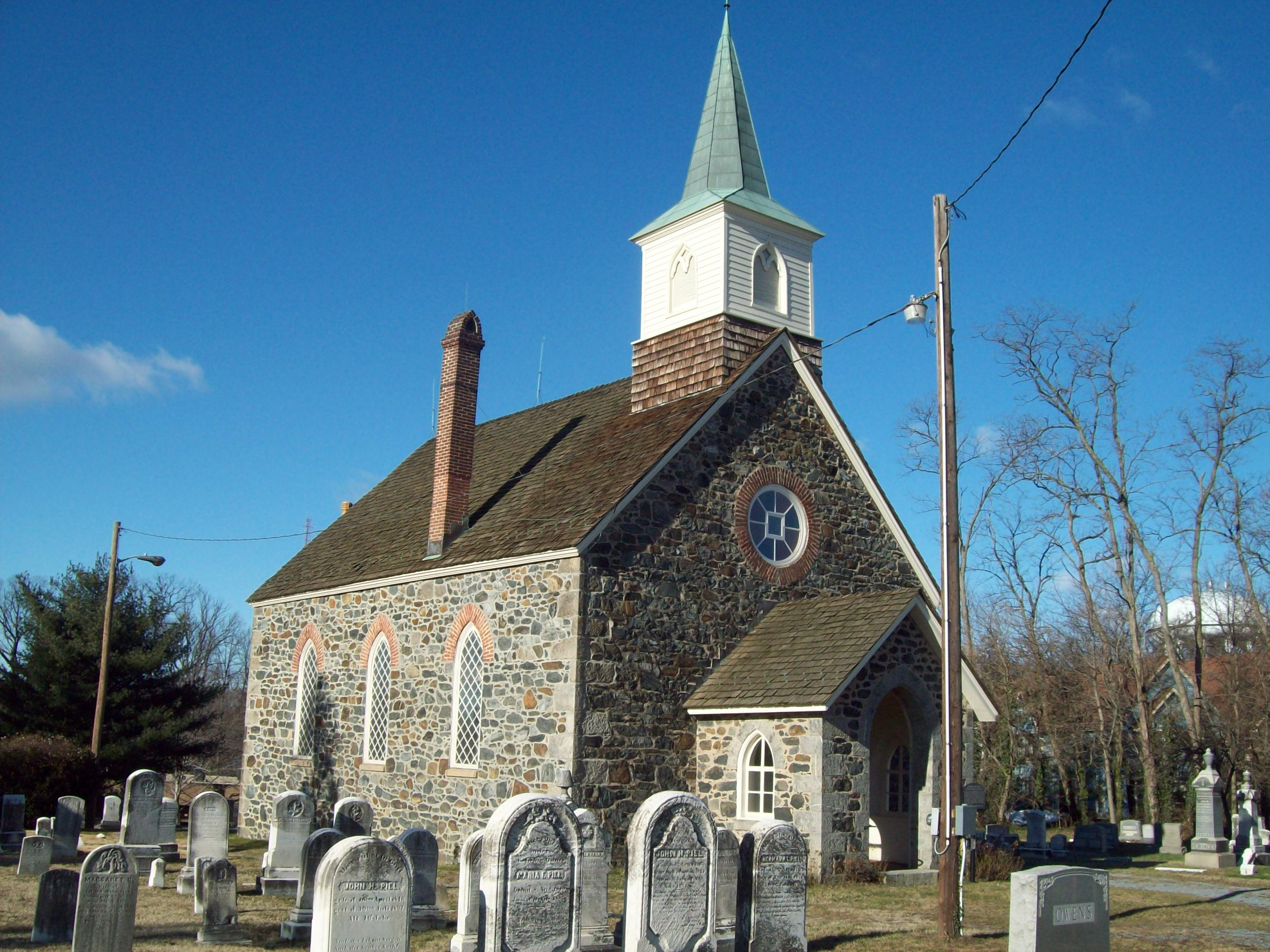
- Old Salem Church and Cemetery, December 2009

- Location within Maryland Location within the United States
- Location: 701 Ingleside Avenue, Catonsville, Maryland
- Coordinates: 39°17′4.7″N 76°43′52.1″W
- Area: 1.3 acres (0.53 ha)
- Built: 1849
- Architects: Moessmeringer, Johann
- Architectural style: Late Gothic Revival
- NRHP reference No.: 77000683
- Added to NRHP: December 13, 1977

Old Salem Church and Cemetery is a historic Lutheran Church and adjacent cemetery located at Catonsville, Baltimore County, Maryland. The main part of the 1849 Gothic Revival church building is a three bay, irregular stone structure approximately 28 feet wide and 42 feet long. It features a gable roof, a short boxy steeple, an entrance porch at the front and an apse at the rear. The interior features a gallery and organ loft has the original tracker organ, which is still hand pumped by a wooden lever on the north side of the case. From early on, the ground to the south of the church was laid out as a cemetery. The church was founded by German Lutheran immigrants.

It was listed on the National Register of Historic Places in 1977.
