= Hutchinson County, South Dakota =

County in South Dakota, United States

- County
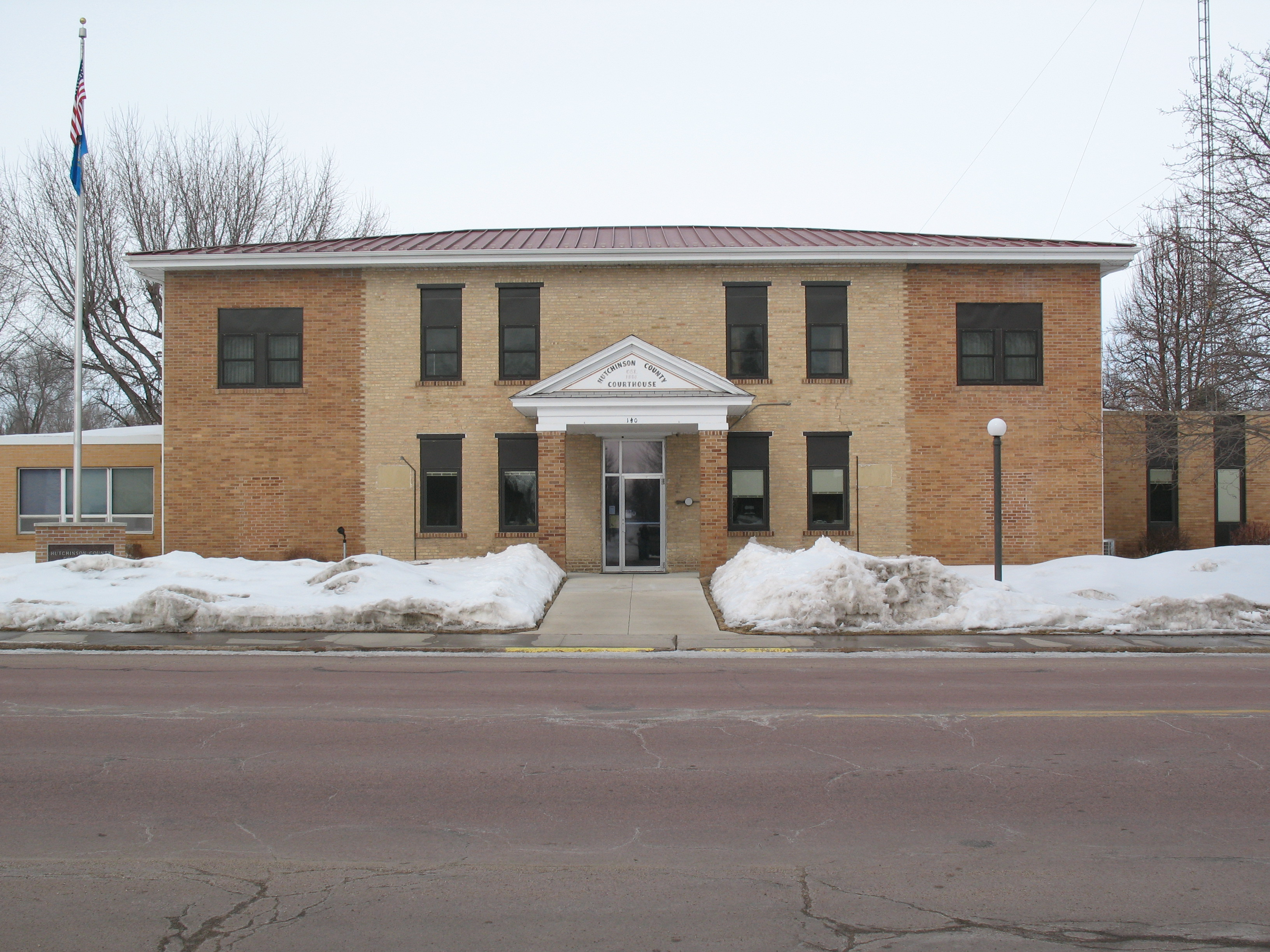
- Former Hutchinson County Courthouse in Olivet

- Location within the U.S. state of South Dakota
- Coordinates: 43°20′N 97°45′W
- Country: United States
- State: South Dakota
- Created: 1862
- Organized: 1871
- Named for: John Hutchinson
- Seat: Olivet
- Largest city: Parkston

Area
  - Total: 814 sq mi (2,110 km^{2})
  - Land: 813 sq mi (2,110 km^{2})
  - Water: 1.5 sq mi (3.9 km^{2}) 0.2%

Population (2020)
  - Total: 7,427
  - Estimate (2025): 7,413 ▼
  - Density: 9.1/sq mi (3.5/km^{2})
- Time zone: UTC−6 (Central)
  - Summer (DST): UTC−5 (CDT)
- Congressional district: At-large
- Website: www.hutchinsoncountysd.gov

Hutchinson County is a county in the U.S. state of South Dakota. As of the 2020 census, the population was 7,427. Its county seat is Olivet. The county was created in 1862 and organized in 1871; it was named for John Hutchinson, first territorial secretary.

== History ==
Hutchinson County was created by act of the territorial legislature on May 8, 1862. Its boundaries included portions of present-day Davison and Hanson Counties, and part of what is presently Hutchinson County was within the boundaries of Jayne County. Maxwell City was established as the county seat, and it remained there until October 1873 when it was moved to Olivet following an election. On 13 January 1871, the territorial legislature established the present county boundaries and completed its governing organization. In two actions in January 1873, the legislature divided Hutchinson County into two counties - the northern half was named Armstrong County, with Milltown as the seat. However, in 1879, Armstrong County was dissolved and its area re-annexed into Hutchinson County. (Note: The Territorial Legislature ordered the re-uniting of the two counties into one, apparently against the desires of Armstrong County officials. The legislature ordered the county officers of Armstrong County to deliver their records, money and papers to Olivet. However, the Armstrong people refused and continued to serve as county officers until a court decision in 1881 compelled them to surrender the records.)

== Geography ==
The James River flows south-southeasterly through the central part of Hutchinson County. The county's terrain consists of rolling hills, with the area largely devoted to agriculture. The terrain slopes to the river valley from both sides, with the county's highest point at its southwest corner: 1,880' (573m) ASL.

Hutchinson County has a total area of 814 square miles (2,110 km^{2}), of which 813 square miles (2,110 km^{2}) is land and 1.5 square miles (3.9 km^{2}) (0.2%) is water.

=== Major highways ===
- U.S. Highway 18
- U.S. Highway 81
- South Dakota Highway 25
- South Dakota Highway 37
- South Dakota Highway 44

=== Adjacent counties ===
- Hanson County – north
- McCook County – northeast
- Turner County – east
- Yankton County – southeast
- Bon Homme County – south
- Charles Mix County – southwest
- Douglas County – west
- Davison County – northwest

=== Protected areas ===
- Mogck Slough State Public Shooting Area
- Weigher Slough State Public Shooting Area

=== Lakes ===
- Lake Dimock
- Lake Menno
- Silver Lake
- Tripp Lake

== Demographics ==
Historical population
Census	Pop.	Note	%±
1870	37		—
1880	5,573		14,962.2%
1890	10,469		87.9%
1900	11,897		13.6%
1910	12,319		3.5%
1920	13,475		9.4%
1930	13,904		3.2%
1940	12,668		−8.9%
1950	11,423		−9.8%
1960	11,085		−3.0%
1970	10,379		−6.4%
1980	9,350		−9.9%
1990	8,262		−11.6%
2000	8,075		−2.3%
2010	7,343		−9.1%
2020	7,427		1.1%
2025 (est.)	7,413	▼	−0.2%
U.S. Decennial Census

=== 2020 census ===
As of the 2020 census, there were 7,427 people, 2,797 households, and 1,802 families residing in the county, and the population density was 9.1 inhabitants per square mile (3.5/km^{2}).

Of the residents, 25.4% were under the age of 18 and 23.4% were 65 years of age or older; the median age was 42.4 years. For every 100 females there were 96.9 males, and for every 100 females age 18 and over there were 97.7 males. 0.0% of residents lived in urban areas and 100.0% lived in rural areas.

The racial makeup of the county was 95.2% White, 0.1% Black or African American, 1.2% American Indian and Alaska Native, 0.3% Asian, 1.1% from some other race, and 2.1% from two or more races. Hispanic or Latino residents of any race comprised 2.1% of the population.

There were 2,797 households in the county, of which 25.2% had children under the age of 18 living with them and 21.2% had a female householder with no spouse or partner present. About 31.7% of all households were made up of individuals and 16.0% had someone living alone who was 65 years of age or older.

There were 3,212 housing units, of which 12.9% were vacant. Among occupied housing units, 78.6% were owner-occupied and 21.4% were renter-occupied. The homeowner vacancy rate was 1.9% and the rental vacancy rate was 12.6%.

=== 2010 census ===
As of the 2010 census, there were 7,343 people, 2,930 households, and 1,871 families in the county. The population density was 9.0 inhabitants per square mile (3.5/km^{2}). There were 3,351 housing units at an average density of 4.1 units per square mile (1.6 units/km^{2}). The racial makeup of the county was 97.4% white, 0.7% American Indian, 0.4% black or African American, 0.2% Asian, 0.5% from other races, and 0.9% from two or more races. Those of Hispanic or Latino origin made up 1.6% of the population. In terms of ancestry, 67.7% were German, 8.7% were Russian, 7.4% were Norwegian, 6.9% were Irish, and 3.6% were American.

Of the 2,930 households, 24.6% had children under the age of 18 living with them, 55.6% were married couples living together, 5.0% had a female householder with no husband present, 36.1% were non-families, and 33.4% of all households were made up of individuals. The average household size was 2.22 and the average family size was 2.82. The median age was 46.8 years.

The median income for a household in the county was $39,310 and the median income for a family was $52,390. Males had a median income of $35,180 versus $25,417 for females. The per capita income for the county was $21,944. About 6.4% of families and 10.4% of the population were below the poverty line, including 11.5% of those under age 18 and 14.5% of those age 65 or over.

=== Mennonites and Hutterites ===
Hutchinson County is the most heavily Mennonite-populated county of South Dakota. German-speaking Mennonites from Russia settled in the county beginning in 1874 until the early 1880s. South Dakota has the nation's largest population of Hutterites, a communal Anabaptist group that emigrated also from Russia during the same period as the Mennonites, with whom they share the Anabaptist faith. Hutterites live in communities each of about 150 people. Wolf Creek Colony is in Hutchinson County, where the Wolf meets the James River. This colony is west of Freeman and north of Olivet and Menno. Other Hutterite communities in the county are Maxwell Colony, New Elm Spring Colony, Old Elm Spring Colony, and Tschetter Colony.

== Communities ==
=== Cities ===
- Freeman
- Parkston

=== Towns ===
- Dimock
- Menno
- Olivet (county seat)
- Tripp

=== Census-designated places ===
- Kaylor
- Maxwell Colony
- Milltown
- New Elm Spring Colony
- Old Elm Spring Colony
- Tschetter Colony
- Wolf Creek Colony

=== Unincorporated communities ===
- Clayton
- Lake Tripp
- Wolf Creek

=== Townships ===
- Capital
- Clayton
- Cross Plains
- Fair
- Foster
- German
- Grandview
- Kassel
- Kaylor
- Kulm
- Liberty
- Mittown
- Molan
- Oak Hollow
- Pleasant
- Sharon
- Silver Lake
- Starr
- Susquehanna
- Sweet
- Valley
- Wittenberg
- Wolf Creek

== Politics ==
Like most of South Dakota, Hutchinson County is overwhelmingly Republican. Only one Democratic presidential candidate – Franklin D. Roosevelt in his 1932 landslide – has carried the county. Surprisingly, in the 1928 and 1972 Republican landslides Hutchinson County actually voted more Democratic than the nation at-large due to German Lutheran anti-Prohibition voting for Al Smith in the first case and a strong “favorite son” vote for George McGovern in the latter. Apart from these cases, only four Democrats have topped forty percent of the county's vote, and only four statewide Republican nominees failed to win a majority.

United States presidential election results for Hutchinson County, South Dakota
Year	Republican		Democratic		Third party(ies)	
Year	No.	%	No.	%	No.	%
1892	1,034	64.42%	254	15.83%	317	19.75%
1896	1,413	74.96%	458	24.30%	14	0.74%
1900	1,528	73.46%	534	25.67%	18	0.87%
1904	1,752	80.33%	365	16.74%	64	2.93%
1908	1,507	69.03%	619	28.36%	57	2.61%
1912	0	0.00%	647	30.25%	1,492	69.75%
1916	1,636	73.20%	519	23.22%	80	3.58%
1920	1,873	51.15%	243	6.64%	1,546	42.22%
1924	893	24.65%	180	4.97%	2,550	70.38%
1928	2,145	52.61%	1,898	46.55%	34	0.83%
1932	1,504	28.97%	3,630	69.92%	58	1.12%
1936	2,804	48.34%	2,500	43.10%	497	8.57%
1940	5,051	82.08%	1,103	17.92%	0	0.00%
1944	3,799	84.46%	699	15.54%	0	0.00%
1948	2,906	70.01%	1,209	29.13%	36	0.87%
1952	4,322	83.16%	875	16.84%	0	0.00%
1956	3,870	73.16%	1,420	26.84%	0	0.00%
1960	3,948	71.72%	1,557	28.28%	0	0.00%
1964	2,884	56.85%	2,189	43.15%	0	0.00%
1968	3,544	69.07%	1,412	27.52%	175	3.41%
1972	3,092	57.82%	2,248	42.03%	8	0.15%
1976	2,822	57.52%	2,062	42.03%	22	0.45%
1980	3,789	73.15%	1,145	22.10%	246	4.75%
1984	3,372	72.92%	1,237	26.75%	15	0.32%
1988	2,700	62.56%	1,594	36.93%	22	0.51%
1992	2,002	48.17%	1,211	29.14%	943	22.69%
1996	2,177	55.66%	1,285	32.86%	449	11.48%
2000	2,497	68.88%	1,052	29.02%	76	2.10%
2004	2,899	69.91%	1,177	28.38%	71	1.71%
2008	2,285	63.33%	1,242	34.42%	81	2.25%
2012	2,451	71.56%	923	26.95%	51	1.49%
2016	2,517	74.80%	692	20.56%	156	4.64%
2020	2,944	78.15%	762	20.23%	61	1.62%
2024	2,918	78.10%	755	20.21%	63	1.69%

== See also ==
- National Register of Historic Places listings in Hutchinson County, South Dakota
