= United Brethren in Christ (Cincinnati, Ohio) =

Historic church in Ohio, United States

- U.S. National Register of Historic Places
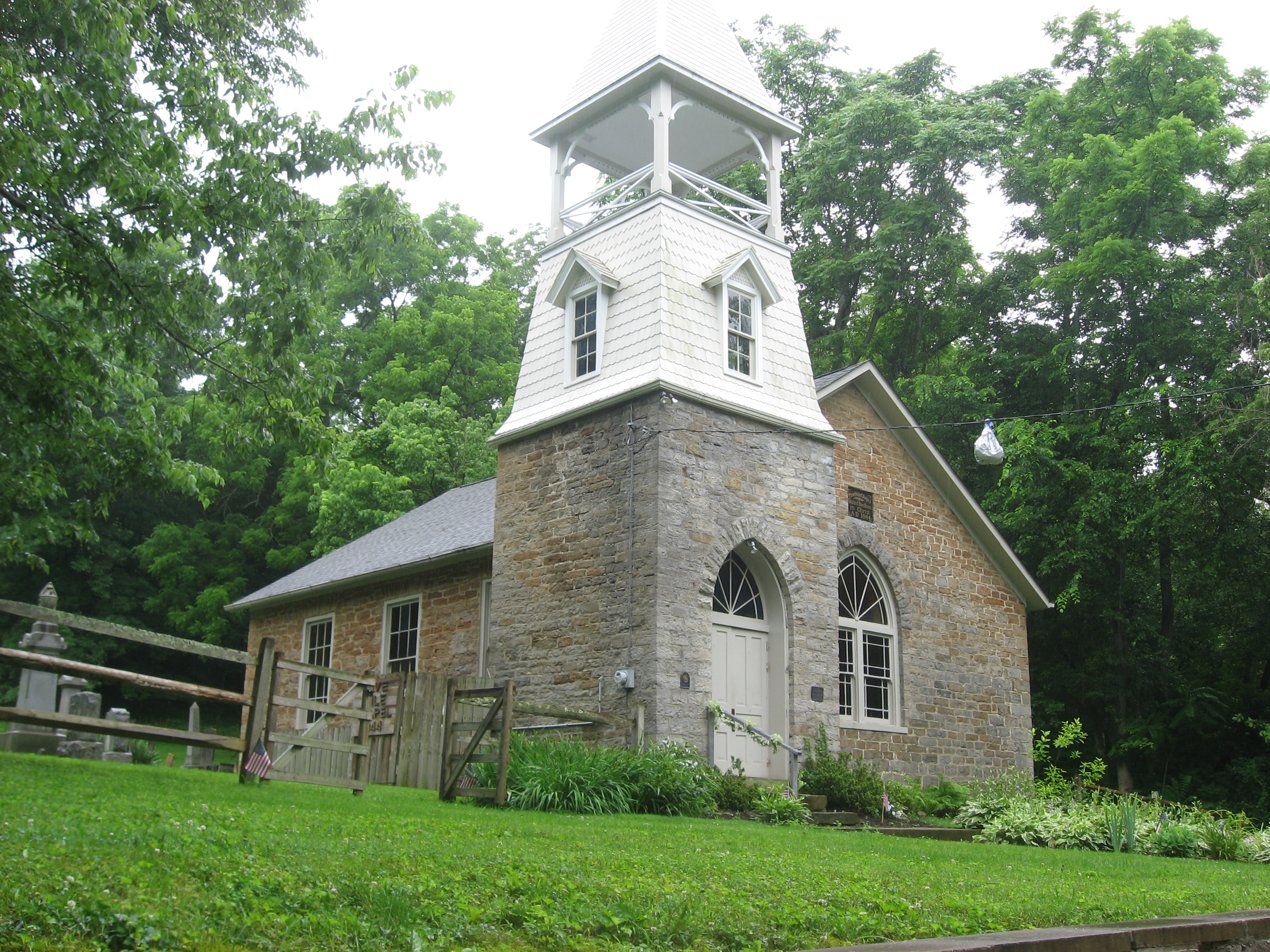
- Front and eastern side of the church

- Location within Ohio Location within the United States
- Nearest city: Cincinnati, Ohio
- Coordinates: 39°3′12″N 84°22′29″W
- Area: 0.7 acres (0.28 ha)
- Built: 1844
- NRHP reference No.: 78002082
- Added to NRHP: June 13, 1978

The United Brethren in Christ Church, also known as "Five Mile Chapel", is a historic church building located southeast of Cincinnati in Anderson Township, Hamilton County, Ohio, United States. Built in 1844, it is a stone building with a stone foundation and a slate roof. It was the house of worship for the oldest Church of the United Brethren in Christ congregation in southeastern Hamilton County, which became the mother of other congregations: some of its members later left to found other United Brethren in Christ churches elsewhere in Hamilton County and in the surrounding community.

The church was built by its members using stones quarried from the small creek that flows past the church building. Its floor plan is that of a rectangle, modified by the 1896 addition of a bell tower to the front with an entrance in its base. Among the most distinctive elements of its architecture is a large Gothic window on the front facade. Except for the front, the church is surrounded by its cemetery, which is of a date approximately equal to the church building.

In 1978, the United Brethren in Christ Church was listed on the National Register of Historic Places. Although both churches and cemeteries must pass hurdles higher than other types of properties to qualify for inclusion on the Register, it qualified both because of its well-preserved architecture and because of its place as a significant component of local history.
