= Milltown, South Dakota =

- Census-designated place
- Location in Hutchinson County and the state of South Dakota
- Coordinates: 43°25′31″N 97°48′29″W
- Country: United States
- State: South Dakota
- Counties: Hutchinson

Area
  - Total: 0.42 sq mi (1.1 km^{2})
  - Land: 0.42 sq mi (1.1 km^{2})
  - Water: 0 sq mi (0 km^{2})
- Elevation: 1,283 ft (391 m)

Population (2020)
  - Total: 8
  - Density: 24/sq mi (9.1/km^{2})
- Time zone: UTC-6 (Central (CST))
  - Summer (DST): UTC-5 (CDT)
- GNIS feature ID: 2393131

Milltown is a census-designated place (CDP) in Hutchinson County, South Dakota, United States. The population was 8 at the 2020 census.

Milltown was so named for the fact many of its early residents milled their supply of flour.

== Geography ==
According to the United States Census Bureau, the CDP has a total area of 0.4 square miles (1.0 km^{2}), all land.

== Demographics ==
Historical population
Census	Pop.	Note	%±
2000	8		—
2010	10		25.0%
2020	8		−20.0%
U.S. Decennial Census

As of the census of 2000, there were 8 people, 6 households, and 1 family residing in the CDP. The population density was 18.6 people per square mile (7.2/km^{2}). There were 9 housing units at an average density of 20.9/sq mi (8.1/km^{2}). The racial makeup of the CDP was 100.00% White.

There were 6 households, out of which none had children under the age of 18 living with them, 33.3% were married couples living together, and 66.7% were non-families. 66.7% of all households were made up of individuals, and 50.0% had someone living alone who was 65 years of age or older. The average household size was 1.33 and the average family size was 2.00.

In the CDP, the population was spread out, with 12.5% from 25 to 44, 50.0% from 45 to 64, and 37.5% who were 65 years of age or older. The median age was 57 years. For every 100 females, there were 60.0 males. For every 100 females age 18 and over, there were 60.0 males.

The median income for a household in the CDP was $8,750, and the median income for a family was $8,750. Males had a median income of $8,750 versus $0 for females. The per capita income for the CDP was $5,031. Below the poverty line were 69.2% of people, 100.0% of families, none of those under 18 and none of those over 64.
