= Freeman Academy =

School in South Dakota, United States

Coordinates: 43.3466°N 97.4390°W

- Freeman, Hutchinson County, South Dakota; United States

Information
- School type: Private boarding school
- Religious affiliation: Mennonites
- Established: 1901; 125 years ago
- Enrollment: c.70-80
- Website: freemanacademy.org

Freeman Academy is a private, Christian elementary school and high school in Freeman, South Dakota, that serves students in grades K-12. The school was founded in 1901 as a junior college, but now functions as only a grade, middle, and high school. The junior college closed in 1986.

The school is affiliated with Mennonite Church, but welcomes students of all denominations. It serves the greater Freeman community primarily, but those enrolled hail from neighboring communities and states, as well. The school accepts foreign exchange students. School enrollment generally falls between 70 and 80 students. Boarding is available for students wishing to attend from a distance.

Freeman Academy athletics features cross country, football, soccer, volleyball, basketball, track, and golf; its mascot is the Bearcat.

== See also ==
- Larry Miller (athlete)
