= Parkston, South Dakota =

- City
- Motto: "Parkston - a great place to grow”
- Location in Hutchinson County and the state of South Dakota
- Coordinates: 43°23′35″N 97°59′11″W
- Country: United States
- State: South Dakota
- County: Hutchinson
- Incorporated: 1886

Area
  - Total: 1.31 sq mi (3.39 km^{2})
  - Land: 1.31 sq mi (3.39 km^{2})
  - Water: 0 sq mi (0.00 km^{2})
- Elevation: 1,401 ft (427 m)

Population (2020)
  - Total: 1,567
  - Density: 1,198.8/sq mi (462.84/km^{2})
- Time zone: UTC−6 (Central (CST))
  - Summer (DST): UTC−5 (CDT)
- ZIP code: 57366
- Area code: 605
- FIPS code: 46-48460
- GNIS feature ID: 1267528
- Website: www.cityofparkston.org

Parkston is a city in Hutchinson County, South Dakota, United States. The population was 1,567 at the 2020 census.

As of 2022, Tim Semmler is the city's current mayor.

== History ==
The city was named for R. S. Parke, a landowner. Parkston was founded in 1886. The first store to be moved from Dakota City to Parkston was the (A.F.) Gimm and (Frank) Weidman's store. Dakota City was moved mostly moved to Parkston by June 25, 1886. Parkston consisted of six or eight general stores, three or four hardware stores, four machine dealers, and a variety of other stores being brought into Parkston. During the first month of Parkston's existence, an average of one building per day was being put up. By November 1886, the town's population had risen to 100 people.

== Geography ==
According to the United States Census Bureau, the city has a total area of 0.91 square miles (2.36 km^{2}), all land.

=== Climate ===
Humid continental climate is a climatic region typified by large seasonal temperature differences, with warm to hot (and often humid) summers and cold (sometimes severely cold) winters. Precipitation is relatively well distributed year-round in many areas with this climate. The Köppen Climate Classification subtype for this climate is "Dfa" (Hot Summer Continental Climate).

== Demographics ==
Historical population
Census	Pop.	Note	%±
1890	262		—
1900	596		127.5%
1910	970		62.8%
1920	1,230		26.8%
1930	1,336		8.6%
1940	1,305		−2.3%
1950	1,354		3.8%
1960	1,514		11.8%
1970	1,611		6.4%
1980	1,545		−4.1%
1990	1,572		1.7%
2000	1,674		6.5%
2010	1,508		−9.9%
2020	1,567		3.9%
U.S. Decennial Census; 2018 Estimate

=== 2020 census ===
As of the 2020 census, Parkston had a population of 1,587. The median age was 43.7 years, 23.7% of residents were under the age of 18, and 26.4% of residents were 65 years of age or older. For every 100 females there were 94.2 males, and for every 100 females age 18 and over there were 91.4 males age 18 and over.

0.0% of residents lived in urban areas, while 100.0% lived in rural areas.

There were 671 households in Parkston, of which 23.1% had children under the age of 18 living in them. Of all households, 50.7% were married-couple households, 21.2% were households with a male householder and no spouse or partner present, and 25.9% were households with a female householder and no spouse or partner present. About 37.1% of all households were made up of individuals and 18.8% had someone living alone who was 65 years of age or older.

There were 757 housing units, of which 11.4% were vacant. The homeowner vacancy rate was 1.6% and the rental vacancy rate was 16.3%.

Racial composition as of the 2020 census
Race	Number	Percent
White	1,481	94.5%
Black or African American	2	0.1%
American Indian and Alaska Native	31	2.0%
Asian	2	0.1%
Native Hawaiian and Other Pacific Islander	0	0.0%
Some other race	6	0.4%
Two or more races	45	2.9%
Hispanic or Latino (of any race)	19	1.2%

=== 2010 census ===
As of the census of 2010, there were 1,508 people, 663 households, and 404 families living in the city. The population density was 1,657.1 inhabitants per square mile (639.8/km^{2}). There were 737 housing units at an average density of 809.9 per square mile (312.7/km^{2}). The racial makeup of the city was 97.1% White, 0.2% African American, 1.7% Native American, 0.1% Asian, and 0.9% from two or more races. Hispanic or Latino of any race were 0.5% of the population.

There were 663 households, of which 24.6% had children under the age of 18 living with them, 51.9% were married couples living together, 6.0% had a female householder with no husband present, 3.0% had a male householder with no wife present, and 39.1% were non-families. 36.8% of all households were made up of individuals, and 22.5% had someone living alone who was 65 years of age or older. The average household size was 2.15 and the average family size was 2.80.

The median age in the city was 47.6 years. 22.8% of residents were under the age of 18; 4.9% were between the ages of 18 and 24; 19.1% were from 25 to 44; 25.4% were from 45 to 64; and 28% were 65 years of age or older. The gender makeup of the city was 46.8% male and 53.2% female.

=== 2000 census ===
As of the census of 2000, there were 1,674 people, 699 households, and 448 families living in the city. The population density was 1,839.5 inhabitants per square mile (710.2/km^{2}). There were 752 housing units at an average density of 826.4 per square mile (319.1/km^{2}). The racial makeup of the city was 97.79% White, 0.18% African American, 1.55% Native American, and 0.48% from two or more races. Hispanic or Latino of any race were 0.72% of the population.

There were 699 households, out of which 25.2% had children under the age of 18 living with them, 56.8% were married couples living together, 4.7% had a female householder with no husband present, and 35.8% were non-families. 33.9% of all households were made up of individuals, and 23.6% had someone living alone who was 65 years of age or older. The average household size was 2.24 and the average family size was 2.87.

In the city, the population was spread out, with 23.4% under the age of 18, 5.4% from 18 to 24, 21.1% from 25 to 44, 17.9% from 45 to 64, and 32.1% who were 65 years of age or older. The median age was 45 years. For every 100 females, there were 85.2 males. For every 100 females age 18 and over, there were 83.1 males.

As of 2000 the median income for a household in the city was $29,662, and the median income for a family was $39,688. Males had a median income of $29,063 versus $17,500 for females. The per capita income for the city was $15,260. About 3.3% of families and 5.7% of the population were below the poverty line, including 5.2% of those under age 18 and 11.1% of those age 65 or over.

== See also ==
- List of cities in South Dakota
