= Menno, South Dakota =

- City
- Location in Hutchinson County and the state of South Dakota
- Coordinates: 43°14′19″N 97°34′39″W
- Country: United States
- State: South Dakota
- County: Hutchinson
- Incorporated: 1910

Area
  - Total: 0.52 sq mi (1.35 km^{2})
  - Land: 0.52 sq mi (1.35 km^{2})
  - Water: 0 sq mi (0.00 km^{2})
- Elevation: 1,332 ft (406 m)

Population (2020)
  - Total: 614
  - Density: 1,177.8/sq mi (454.76/km^{2})
- Time zone: UTC-6 (Central (CST))
  - Summer (DST): UTC-5 (CDT)
- ZIP code: 57045
- Area code: 605
- FIPS code: 46-41980
- GNIS feature ID: 1267474
- Website: http://www.mennosd.org/

Menno is a city in Hutchinson County, South Dakota, United States. The population was 614 at the 2020 census.

Menno was laid out in 1879.

== Geography ==
According to the United States Census Bureau, the city has a total area of 0.52 square miles (1.35 km^{2}), all land.

== Demographics ==
Historical population
Census	Pop.	Note	%±
1880	52		—
1890	413		694.2%
1900	556		34.6%
1910	621		11.7%
1920	918		47.8%
1930	909		−1.0%
1940	966		6.3%
1950	868		−10.1%
1960	837		−3.6%
1970	796		−4.9%
1980	793		−0.4%
1990	768		−3.2%
2000	729		−5.1%
2010	608		−16.6%
2020	614		1.0%
U.S. Decennial Census

=== 2020 census ===
As of the 2020 census, Menno had a population of 614. The median age was 54.5 years. 19.1% of residents were under the age of 18 and 34.7% of residents were 65 years of age or older. For every 100 females there were 84.4 males, and for every 100 females age 18 and over there were 86.8 males age 18 and over.

There were 282 households in Menno, of which 19.1% had children under the age of 18 living in them. Of all households, 48.2% were married-couple households, 20.6% were households with a male householder and no spouse or partner present, and 27.7% were households with a female householder and no spouse or partner present. About 41.1% of all households were made up of individuals and 20.9% had someone living alone who was 65 years of age or older.

There were 325 housing units, of which 13.2% were vacant. The homeowner vacancy rate was 3.4% and the rental vacancy rate was 9.7%.

0.0% of residents lived in urban areas, while 100.0% lived in rural areas.

Racial composition as of the 2020 census
Race	Number	Percent
White	604	98.4%
Black or African American	0	0.0%
American Indian and Alaska Native	3	0.5%
Asian	0	0.0%
Native Hawaiian and Other Pacific Islander	0	0.0%
Some other race	4	0.7%
Two or more races	3	0.5%
Hispanic or Latino (of any race)	2	0.3%

=== 2010 census ===
As of the census of 2010, there were 608 people, 285 households, and 173 families residing in the city. The population density was 1,169.2 inhabitants per square mile (451.4/km^{2}). There were 327 housing units at an average density of 628.8 per square mile (242.8/km^{2}). The racial makeup of the city was 98.7% White, 0.5% Native American, and 0.8% from two or more races. Hispanic or Latino of any race were 0.8% of the population.

There were 285 households, of which 17.5% had children under the age of 18 living with them, 54.4% were married couples living together, 4.2% had a female householder with no husband present, 2.1% had a male householder with no wife present, and 39.3% were non-families. 37.2% of all households were made up of individuals, and 21.4% had someone living alone who was 65 years of age or older. The average household size was 1.96 and the average family size was 2.53.

The median age in the city was 57.1 years. 15% of residents were under the age of 18; 3.9% were between the ages of 18 and 24; 14.3% were from 25 to 44; 26.5% were from 45 to 64; and 40.3% were 65 years of age or older. The gender makeup of the city was 46.2% male and 53.8% female.

=== 2000 census ===
As of the census of 2000, there were 729 people, 317 households, and 199 families residing in the city. The population density was 1,435.8 inhabitants per square mile (554.4/km^{2}). There were 358 housing units at an average density of 705.1 per square mile (272.2/km^{2}). The racial makeup of the city was 98.77% White, 0.14% African American, 0.41% Native American, and 0.69% from two or more races.

There were 317 homes out of which 22.1% had children under the age of 18 living with them, 56.2% were married couples living together, 4.4% had a female householder with no husband present, and 37.2% were non-families. 35.3% of all households were made up of individuals, and 25.2% had someone living alone who was 65 years of age or older. The average household size was 2.15 and the average family size was 2.77.

In the city, the population was spread out, with 20.3% under the age of 18, 4.0% from 18 to 24, 18.1% from 25 to 44, 17.8% from 45 to 64, and 39.8% who were 65 years of age or older. The median age was 52 years. For every 100 females, there were 90.8 males. For every 100 females age 18 and over, there were 81.0 males.

The median income for a household in the city was $26,750, and the median income for a family was $38,125. Males had a median income of $23,194 versus $18,750 for females. The per capita income for the city was $14,668. About 7.7% of families and 9.0% of the population were below the poverty line, including 7.8% of those under age 18 and 11.4% of those age 65 or over.

== Climate ==
Humid continental climate is a climatic region typified by large seasonal temperature differences, with warm to hot (and often humid) summers and cold (sometimes severely cold) winters. Precipitation is relatively well distributed year-round in many areas with this climate. The Köppen Climate Classification subtype for this climate is "Dfa". (Hot Summer Continental Climate).

Climate data for Menno, South Dakota (1991−2020 normals, extremes 1896−present)
Month	Jan	Feb	Mar	Apr	May	Jun	Jul	Aug	Sep	Oct	Nov	Dec	Year
Record high °F (°C)	70 (21)	75 (24)	94 (34)	100 (38)	108 (42)	110 (43)	117 (47)	116 (47)	108 (42)	96 (36)	83 (28)	68 (20)	117 (47)
Mean maximum °F (°C)	51.3 (10.7)	57.2 (14.0)	72.8 (22.7)	84.3 (29.1)	90.6 (32.6)	95.7 (35.4)	96.1 (35.6)	93.8 (34.3)	91.6 (33.1)	84.2 (29.0)	69.6 (20.9)	52.1 (11.2)	98.9 (37.2)
Mean daily maximum °F (°C)	28.4 (−2.0)	33.7 (0.9)	47.0 (8.3)	60.8 (16.0)	72.5 (22.5)	82.2 (27.9)	85.8 (29.9)	83.0 (28.3)	77.1 (25.1)	62.7 (17.1)	45.4 (7.4)	31.8 (−0.1)	59.2 (15.1)
Daily mean °F (°C)	19.2 (−7.1)	23.7 (−4.6)	36.0 (2.2)	48.5 (9.2)	60.4 (15.8)	70.7 (21.5)	74.4 (23.6)	71.8 (22.1)	64.6 (18.1)	50.7 (10.4)	35.2 (1.8)	22.9 (−5.1)	48.2 (9.0)
Mean daily minimum °F (°C)	9.9 (−12.3)	13.8 (−10.1)	25.1 (−3.8)	36.2 (2.3)	48.3 (9.1)	59.2 (15.1)	63.1 (17.3)	60.7 (15.9)	52.0 (11.1)	38.8 (3.8)	25.0 (−3.9)	14.1 (−9.9)	37.2 (2.9)
Mean minimum °F (°C)	−15.7 (−26.5)	−10.3 (−23.5)	−0.4 (−18.0)	18.9 (−7.3)	32.4 (0.2)	45.9 (7.7)	50.2 (10.1)	47.4 (8.6)	33.0 (0.6)	19.2 (−7.1)	3.4 (−15.9)	−10.3 (−23.5)	−20.9 (−29.4)
Record low °F (°C)	−34 (−37)	−42 (−41)	−24 (−31)	−7 (−22)	17 (−8)	30 (−1)	40 (4)	35 (2)	16 (−9)	−6 (−21)	−26 (−32)	−38 (−39)	−42 (−41)
Average precipitation inches (mm)	0.53 (13)	0.66 (17)	1.27 (32)	2.72 (69)	3.41 (87)	3.64 (92)	2.79 (71)	3.28 (83)	2.86 (73)	2.06 (52)	0.99 (25)	0.82 (21)	25.03 (636)
Average snowfall inches (cm)	7.1 (18)	7.4 (19)	6.0 (15)	4.0 (10)	0.3 (0.76)	0.0 (0.0)	0.0 (0.0)	0.0 (0.0)	0.0 (0.0)	1.2 (3.0)	5.4 (14)	7.8 (20)	39.2 (100)
Average precipitation days (≥ 0.01 in)	4.7	4.9	6.2	8.3	10.8	9.7	7.2	7.6	6.3	6.6	4.6	4.8	81.7
Average snowy days (≥ 0.1 in)	5.1	5.2	3.6	2.0	0.1	0.0	0.0	0.0	0.0	0.5	2.6	5.0	24.1
Source: NOAA
