= Freeman, South Dakota =

- City
- Location in Hutchinson County and the state of South Dakota
- Coordinates: 43°20′51″N 97°25′51″W
- Country: United States
- State: South Dakota
- County: Hutchinson
- Incorporated: 1893

Area
  - Total: 1.49 sq mi (3.86 km^{2})
  - Land: 1.49 sq mi (3.86 km^{2})
  - Water: 0 sq mi (0.00 km^{2})
- Elevation: 1,522 ft (464 m)

Population (2020)
  - Total: 1,329
  - Density: 892.8/sq mi (344.72/km^{2})
- Time zone: UTC-6 (Central (CST))
  - Summer (DST): UTC-5 (CDT)
- ZIP code: 57029
- Area code: 605
- FIPS code: 46-23020
- GNIS feature ID: 1267396
- Website: www.cityoffreeman.org

Freeman is a city in Hutchinson County, South Dakota, United States. The population was 1,329 at the 2020 census.

Freeman was laid out in 1879.

== Geography ==
According to the United States Census Bureau, the city has a total area of 1.11 square miles (2.87 km^{2}), all land.

== Demographics ==
Historical population
Census	Pop.	Note	%±
1900	525		—
1910	615		17.1%
1920	894		45.4%
1930	987		10.4%
1940	976		−1.1%
1950	944		−3.3%
1960	1,140		20.8%
1970	1,357		19.0%
1980	1,462		7.7%
1990	1,293		−11.6%
2000	1,317		1.9%
2010	1,306		−0.8%
2020	1,329		1.8%
U.S. Decennial Census

=== 2020 census ===
As of the 2020 census, Freeman had a population of 1,329. The median age was 48.5 years. 20.8% of residents were under the age of 18 and 28.7% of residents were 65 years of age or older. For every 100 females there were 89.0 males, and for every 100 females age 18 and over there were 85.9 males age 18 and over.

0.0% of residents lived in urban areas, while 100.0% lived in rural areas.

There were 556 households in Freeman, of which 21.0% had children under the age of 18 living in them. Of all households, 49.1% were married-couple households, 17.1% were households with a male householder and no spouse or partner present, and 29.5% were households with a female householder and no spouse or partner present. About 37.4% of all households were made up of individuals and 21.6% had someone living alone who was 65 years of age or older.

There were 635 housing units, of which 12.4% were vacant. The homeowner vacancy rate was 4.1% and the rental vacancy rate was 9.4%.

Racial composition as of the 2020 census
Race	Number	Percent
White	1,205	90.7%
Black or African American	2	0.2%
American Indian and Alaska Native	19	1.4%
Asian	9	0.7%
Native Hawaiian and Other Pacific Islander	0	0.0%
Some other race	59	4.4%
Two or more races	35	2.6%
Hispanic or Latino (of any race)	90	6.8%

=== 2010 census ===
As of the census of 2010, there were 1,306 people, 602 households, and 320 families living in the city. The population density was 1,176.6 inhabitants per square mile (454.3/km^{2}). There were 672 housing units at an average density of 605.4 per square mile (233.7/km^{2}). The racial makeup of the city was 94.3% White, 1.4% African American, 0.8% Native American, 0.2% Asian, 1.4% from other races, and 2.0% from two or more races. Hispanic or Latino of any race were 5.3% of the population.

There were 602 households, of which 23.4% had children under the age of 18 living with them, 44.5% were married couples living together, 6.1% had a female householder with no husband present, 2.5% had a male householder with no wife present, and 46.8% were non-families. 44.2% of all households were made up of individuals, and 29.9% had someone living alone who was 65 years of age or older. The average household size was 2.08 and the average family size was 2.93.

The median age in the city was 48.6 years. 22.1% of residents were under the age of 18; 5.9% were between the ages of 18 and 24; 17.8% were from 25 to 44; 22.7% were from 45 to 64; and 31.5% were 65 years of age or older. The gender makeup of the city was 44.5% male and 55.5% female.

=== 2000 census ===
As of the census of 2000, there were 1,317 people, 602 households, and 364 families living in the city. The population density was 1,229.3 inhabitants per square mile (474.6/km^{2}). There were 648 housing units at an average density of 604.8 per square mile (233.5/km^{2}). The racial makeup of the city was 99.39% White, 0.08% African American, 0.38% Native American, and 0.15% from two or more races. Hispanic or Latino of any race were 0.15% of the population.

There were 602 households, out of which 21.4% had children under the age of 18 living with them, 52.7% were married couples living together, 5.6% had a female householder with no husband present, and 39.5% were non-families. 38.2% of all households were made up of individuals, and 25.9% had someone living alone who was 65 years of age or older. The average household size was 2.09 and the average family size was 2.78.

In the city, the population was spread out, with 19.7% under the age of 18, 4.7% from 18 to 24, 21.6% from 25 to 44, 19.1% from 45 to 64, and 34.9% who were 65 years of age or older. The median age was 48 years. For every 100 females, there were 80.9 males. For every 100 females age 18 and over, there were 74.7 males.

As of 2000 the median income for a household in the city was $29,152, and the median income for a family was $39,118. Males had a median income of $26,795 versus $17,788 for females. The per capita income for the city was $17,077. About 4.1% of families and 6.0% of the population were below the poverty line, including 6.1% of those under age 18 and 10.2% of those age 65 or over.

== Notable person ==
- Connor Hansen, Wisconsin Supreme Court justice

== Education ==
Freeman High School and Freeman Elementary are the local public schools, home to the Freeman Flyers.

Freeman Junior College, started in 1903, was a small institution that begun the Mennonite-based education in Freeman. The Junior College closed in 1986, but the education continues on the campus as the Freeman Academy. The Freeman Academy is a private, Christian middle school and high school that serves students in grades 1-12.

== Local culture ==
- Freeman is considered the chislic capital of America and as such it is the location of The South Dakota Chislic Festival. Local restaurants serve chislic as a local specialty.
- Schmeckfest, begun in 1959, is an annual 'festival of tasting' in Freeman. It is considered one of South Dakota's premier festivals. It features the ethnic foods/culture/history and musical traditions of the community.
- Heritage Hall Museum & Archives is an independent, not-for-profit museum in Freeman, preserving and sharing the history of the immigrants - primarily Germans from Russia - who settled in the area in the 1870s. It includes two large exhibit halls containing artifacts, an archives/library and four historic buildings. It is open year-round.
