= Olivet, South Dakota =

- Town
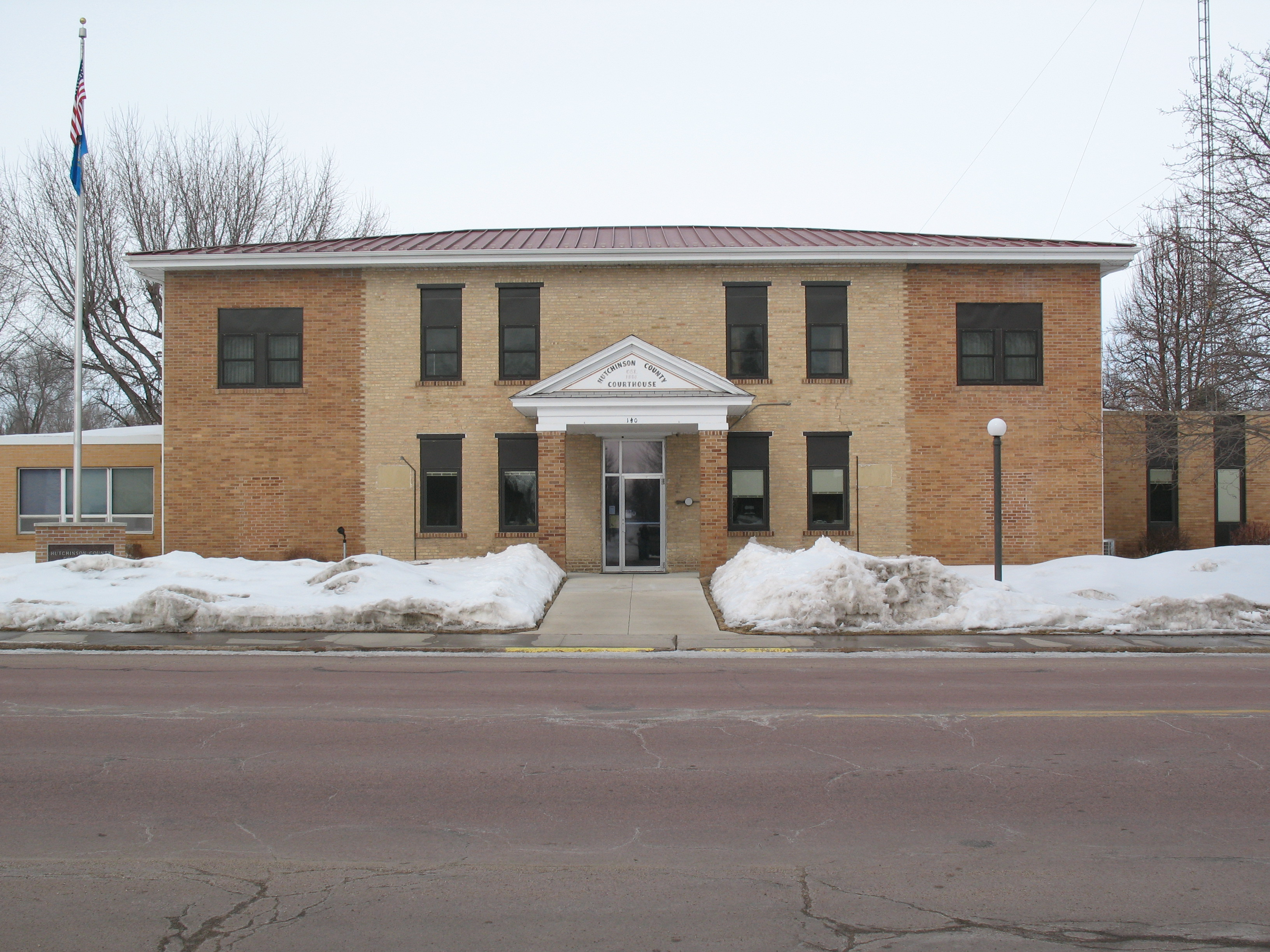
- The Hutchinson County courthouse, February 2010

- Location in Hutchinson County and the state of South Dakota
- Coordinates: 43°14′35″N 97°40′29″W
- Country: United States
- State: South Dakota
- County: Hutchinson
- Platted: 1873

Area
  - Total: 0.20 sq mi (0.52 km^{2})
  - Land: 0.20 sq mi (0.52 km^{2})
  - Water: 0 sq mi (0.00 km^{2})
- Elevation: 1,250 ft (380 m)

Population (2020)
  - Total: 64
  - Density: 318.1/sq mi (122.81/km^{2})
- Time zone: UTC-6 (Central (CST))
  - Summer (DST): UTC-5 (CDT)
- ZIP code: 57052
- Area code: 605
- FIPS code: 46-46900
- GNIS feature ID: 1267522

Olivet is a town in and the county seat of Hutchinson County, South Dakota, United States. The population was 64 at the time of the 2020 census.

== History ==
Olivet was established in 1871 as the county seat. The town was named after Olivet, Michigan, the native home of first settlers. The first county courts were housed in a Methodist church; a permanent courthouse was built in 1881.

== Geography ==
According to the United States Census Bureau, the town has a total area of 0.15 square miles (0.39 km^{2}), all land.

Olivet lies north of Lonetree Creek and is on the west bank of the James River.

== Highways ==
The only highway that goes through Olivet is U.S. Highway 18 running east–west. 426 Avenue runs north–south through the town.

== Demographics ==
Historical population
Census	Pop.	Note	%±
1890	105		—
1900	156		48.6%
1910	133		−14.7%
1920	200		50.4%
1930	184		−8.0%
1940	242		31.5%
1950	202		−16.5%
1960	135		−33.2%
1970	103		−23.7%
1980	96		−6.8%
1990	74		−22.9%
2000	70		−5.4%
2010	74		5.7%
2020	64		−13.5%
U.S. Decennial Census

=== 2010 census ===
As of the census of 2010, there were 74 people, 39 households, and 27 families residing in the town. The population density was 493.3 inhabitants per square mile (190.5/km^{2}). There were 47 housing units at an average density of 313.3 per square mile (121.0/km^{2}). The racial makeup of the town was 93.2% White, 2.7% Asian, and 4.1% from two or more races.

There were 39 households, of which 12.8% had children under the age of 18 living with them, 59.0% were married couples living together, 7.7% had a female householder with no husband present, 2.6% had a male householder with no wife present, and 30.8% were non-families. 28.2% of all households were made up of individuals, and 20.6% had someone living alone who was 65 years of age or older. The average household size was 1.90 and the average family size was 2.26.

The median age in the town was 60.5 years. 9.5% of residents were under the age of 18; 2.8% were between the ages of 18 and 24; 5.5% were from 25 to 44; 48.7% were from 45 to 64; and 33.8% were 65 years of age or older. The gender makeup of the town was 48.6% male and 51.4% female.

=== 2000 census ===
As of the census of 2000, there were 70 people, 37 households, and 22 families residing in the town. The population density was 443.5 inhabitants per square mile (171.2/km^{2}). There were 43 housing units at an average density of 272.4 per square mile (105.2/km^{2}). The racial makeup of the town was 90.00% White, 2.86% Native American, and 7.14% from two or more races.

There were 37 households, out of which 8.1% had children under the age of 18 living with them, 54.1% were married couples living together, 2.7% had a female householder with no husband present, and 40.5% were non-families. 37.8% of all households were made up of individuals, and 24.3% had someone living alone who was 65 years of age or older. The average household size was 1.89 and the average family size was 2.45.

In the town, the population was spread out, with 8.6% under the age of 18, 8.6% from 18 to 24, 18.6% from 25 to 44, 32.9% from 45 to 64, and 31.4% who were 65 years of age or older. The median age was 54 years. For every 100 females, there were 112.1 males. For every 100 females age 18 and over, there were 113.3 males.

The median income for a household in the town was $35,625, and the median income for a family was $39,750. Males had a median income of $25,313 versus $22,083 for females. The per capita income for the town was $27,454. There were no families and 3.4% of the population living below the poverty line, including no under eighteens and 6.5% of those over 64.

== See also ==
- List of towns in South Dakota
