= National Register of Historic Places listings in Potter County, South Dakota =

Location of Potter County in South Dakota

Nine properties in Potter County, South Dakota, United States, are listed on the National Register of Historic Places. The locations of National Register properties for which the latitude and longitude coordinates are included below, may be seen in a map.

This National Park Service list is complete through NPS recent listings posted December 19, 2025.

== Current listings ==
	Name on the Register	Image	Date listed	Location	City or town	Description
1	Archeological Site No. 39PO205		August 6, 1993 (#93000799)	Address restricted	Gettysburg	
2	Archeological Site No. 39PO63		August 6, 1993 (#93000800)	Address restricted	Gettysburg	
3	D.H. and Leah Curran House	D.H. and Leah Curran House	July 5, 1996 (#96000741)	206 S. Broadway; 45°00′36″N 99°56′59″W	Gettysburg	
4	DeRouchey-Hageman Barn and Farmyard		January 25, 2024 (#100009810)	31276 155th Street; 45°08′39″N 99°56′30″W	Gettysburg	
5	George Holland House	George Holland House	October 19, 1989 (#89001721)	314 N. Exene St. 45°00′52″N 99°57′20″W	Gettysburg	
6	North Canton School-District No. 12		May 8, 1986 (#86001025)	Off Highway 47; 45°03′22″N 99°36′45″W	Seneca	
7	Potter County Courthouse	Potter County Courthouse	July 5, 1996 (#96000743)	201 S. Exene St. 45°00′35″N 99°57′16″W	Gettysburg	
8	St. Bernard's Catholic Church	St. Bernard's Catholic Church	May 7, 1980 (#80003731)	Highway 20; 45°14′21″N 99°46′34″W	Hoven	
9	G.L. Stocker Blacksmith Shop	G.L. Stocker Blacksmith Shop	July 5, 1996 (#96000744)	Main St., 2 blocks south of U.S. Route 212; 45°00′40″N 99°57′25″W	Gettysburg	

== See also ==
- List of National Historic Landmarks in South Dakota
- National Register of Historic Places listings in South Dakota
