= North Dakota Highway 24 =

State highway in North Dakota, US

North Dakota Highway 24

Route information
- Maintained by NDDOT
- Length: 45.0 mi (72.4 km)
- Existed: 1937–present
- Tourist routes: Lewis and Clark Trail; Native American Scenic Byway

Major junctions
- CW end: ND 6 east of Selfridge
- CCW end: ND 6 west of Solen

Location
- Country: United States
- State: North Dakota
- Counties: Sioux

Highway system
- North Dakota State Highway System; Interstate; US; State
← ND 23A	→ ND 25

North Dakota Highway 24 (ND 24) is a minor north–south highway contained entirely within Sioux County, North Dakota. It runs from one junction with ND 6 east of Selfridge near the South Dakota border to another junction on ND 6 west of Solen.

== Route description ==
ND 24 begins at an intersection with ND 6 east of Selfridge, just north of the South Dakota–North Dakota state line. From there, it travels east until it meets ND 1806 south of Fort Yates. From there, the two routes run north concurrently, through Fort Yates and alongside the west bank of the Missouri River as part of the Lewis and Clark Trail. Just southwest of Cannon Ball, ND 24 splits from ND 1806 and heads west along the south bank of the Cannonball River, going through Solen, and terminating at an intersection with ND 6 near the unincorporated community of Breien.

== Junctions ==
The entire route is in Sioux County.

Location	mi	km	Destinations	Notes
Unorganized Territory of Fort Yates	0.000	0.000	ND 6 – McLaughlin, Selfridge, Mandan	Southern terminus
Fort Yates			BIA Rd. 3 / Lewis and Clark Trail / Native American Scenic Byway to SD 1806 – Kenel	
Cannon Ball	29.904	48.126	ND 1806 north / Lewis and Clark Trail / Native American Scenic Byway – Cannon Ball, Mandan	Southern terminus of ND 1806
North Sioux	45.046	72.495	ND 6 – Selfridge, Mandan	Western terminus
1.000 mi = 1.609 km; 1.000 km = 0.621 mi
