= U.S. Route 212 in South Dakota =

Highway in South Dakota

U.S. Highway 212

Route information
- Maintained by SDDOT
- Length: 412.45 mi (663.77 km)

Major junctions
- West end: US 212 at the Wyoming state line
- US 85 at Belle Fourche; US 83 near Gettysburg; US 281 at Redfield; US 81 at Watertown; I-29 at Watertown
- East end: US 212 at the Minnesota state line

Location
- Country: United States
- State: South Dakota
- Counties: Butte, Meade, Ziebach, Dewey, Potter, Faulk, Hand, Spink, Clark, Codington, Deuel

Highway system
- United States Numbered Highway System; List; Special; Divided; South Dakota State Trunk Highway System; Interstate; US; State
← SD 204	→ SD 214

U.S. Route 212 (US 212) is a part of the U.S. Highway System that travels from Yellowstone National Park east to Edina, Minnesota. In South Dakota, it starts at the Wyoming state line northeast of Belle Fourche and extends approximately 412 miles (663 km) to the Minnesota state line east of Goodwin.

== Route description ==
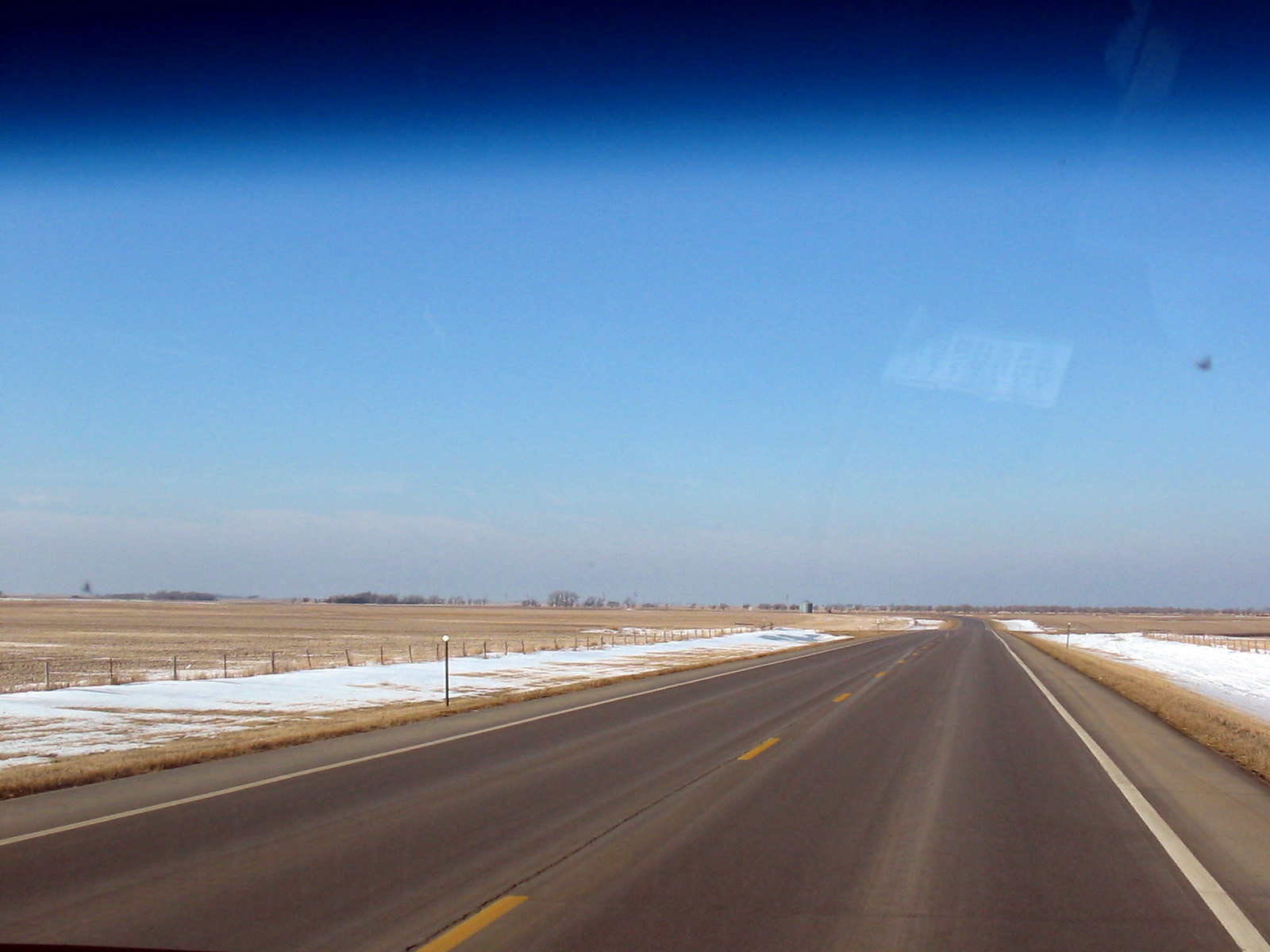
US 212 near Carpenter

US 212 enters South Dakota near the Wyoming state line, 20.5 miles (33.0 km) southeast of the Montana state line, and continues 13 miles (21 km) southeast to Belle Fourche. Here it intersects US 85, and then continues eastward, skirting the southern end of the Belle Fourche Reservoir. It continues east for 21 miles (34 km), passing Nisland, until intersecting with South Dakota Highway 79 (SD 79) where they are briefly cosigned until Newell. US 212 continues east, passing through Faith, and enters the Cheyenne River Indian Reservation, where it continues through Dupree and North Eagle Butte, and reaches the Lake Oahe, a reservoir on the Missouri River.

US 212 crosses the Missouri River, leaving the Cheyenne River Indian Reservation, and travels 11 miles (18 km) east where it intersects (and briefly co-signed) US 83 near Gettysburg. US 212 continues eastward for 52 miles (84 km) through Gettysburg, Seneca, and Faulkton before reaching SD 45, where they are cosigned and turn south for 11 miles (18 km), before continuing eastward for 23 miles (37 km), passing through Rockham and Zell before reaching Redfield where it intersects with US 281.

Continuing east for 63 miles (101 km), US 212 passes through Frankfort, Doland, Clark, and Henry before passing the southern edge of Lake Kampeska and entering Watertown. US 212 follows 9th Avenue S, intersecting US 81 near the downtown area and Interstate 29 on the city's eastern edge. US 212 continues east for 33 miles (53 km), passing through Krazburg and Goodwin, before crossing into Minnesota.

Legally, the South Dakota section of US 212 is defined at South Dakota Codified Laws § 31-4-206.

== Major intersections ==
County	Location	mi	km	Destinations	Notes
Butte		0.00	0.00	US 212 west – Alzada	Continuation into Wyoming and Montana
Butte	Belle Fourche	13.44	21.63	US 85 to I-90 – Buffalo, Spearfish	
Butte		15.21	24.48	US 212 Bus. west	
Butte		36.16	58.19	SD 79 south – Sturgis	Western end of SD 79 concurrency
Butte	Newell	39.16	63.02	SD 79 north – Reva	Eastern end of SD 79 concurrency
Meade		110.89	178.46	SD 73 north – Lemmon	Western end of SD 73 concurrency
Meade	Faith	114.07	183.58	SD 73 south – Philip	Eastern end of SD 73 concurrency
Ziebach	Dupree	138.05	222.17	SD 65 north – Isabel, McIntosh	
Dewey	North Eagle Butte	152.98	246.20	SD 63 south / Lewis and Clark Trail	Western end of SD 63 concurrency
Dewey		158.94	255.79	SD 63 north / Lewis and Clark Trail – Timber Lake	Eastern end of SD 63 concurrency
Lake Oahe (Missouri River)		207.66– 208.53	334.20– 335.60	U.S. Route 212 Missouri River Bridge	
Potter	Forest City	209.08	336.48	SD 1804 south	Western end of SD 1804 concurrency
Potter		213.21	343.13	SD 1804 north	Eastern end of SD 1804 concurrency
Potter		219.41	353.11	US 83 south – Onida	Western end of US 83 concurrency
Potter		220.19	354.36	US 83 north – Selby	Eastern end of US 83 concurrency
Potter		234.63	377.60	SD 47 north – Lebanon, Hoven	Western end of SD 47 concurrency
Faulk	Seneca–Latham township line	250.93	403.83	SD 47 south – Highmore	Eastern end of SD 47 concurrency
Faulk	Lafoon Township	272.19	438.05	SD 45 north – Ipswich	Western end of SD 45 concurrency
Faulk–Hand county line	Arcade–Park township line	283.20	455.77	SD 45 south – Miller	Eastern end of SD 45 concurrency
Spink	Redfield	306.46	493.20	US 281 south (W. 3rd Street) to US 14	Western end of US 281 concurrency
Spink	Redfield	306.97	494.02	US 281 north (E. 3rd Street) – Aberdeen	Eastern end of US 281 concurrency
Spink	Prairie Centre–Belle Plaine township line	321.98	518.18	SD 37 south – Huron	Western end of SD 37 concurrency
Spink	Doland	321.98	518.18	SD 37 north – Conde, Groton	Eastern end of SD 37 concurrency
Clark	Elrod Township	354.69	570.82	SD 25 south – DeSmet	Eastern end of SD 25 concurrency
Clark	Elrod Township	355.56	572.22	SD 25 north – Webster	Eastern end of SD 25 concurrency
Codington	Watertown	370.27	595.89	78th Street W to SD 28	Former SD 139 north
Codington	Watertown	376.22	605.47	SD 20 north (10th Street W) / 20th Avenue S – Florence	
Codington	Watertown	377.34	607.27	US 81 (5th Street SE)	
Codington	Watertown	379.74	611.13	I-29 – Summit, Brookings	I-29 exit 177
Deuel	Portland Township	398.00	640.52	SD 15 south – Clear Lake	Eastern end of SD 15 concurrency
Deuel	Portland–Lowe township line	402.81	648.26	SD 15 north – Milbank	Eastern end of SD 15 concurrency
Deuel	Antelope Valley Township	412.45	663.77	US 212 east – Montevideo	Continuation into Minnesota
1.000 mi = 1.609 km; 1.000 km = 0.621 mi: Concurrency terminus

== Belle Fourche business route ==
Highway 212 Business
- Location: Belle Fourche
- Length: 2.10 mi (3.38 km)

Highway 212 Business (US 212 Bus.) in Belle Fourche is an unofficial route that goes into the downtown area of Belle Fourche. It is not signed with a US Highway shield and is not a state-maintained highway.

== See also ==
U.S. Route 212
Previous state: Wyoming	South Dakota	Next state: Minnesota
