= South Dakota Highway 1804 =

State Highway in South Dakota

Highway 1804
- SD 1804 highlighted in red

Route information
- Maintained by SDDOT
- Length: 126.745 mi (203.976 km)
- Existed: 1975–present
- Tourist routes: Lewis and Clark Trail

Central Charles Mix County segment
- Length: 3.792 mi (6.103 km)
- South end: Shore of the Missouri River south of Geddes
- North end: SD 50 south of Geddes

Northwest Charles Mix County segment
- Length: 8.039 mi (12.938 km)
- South end: 359th Avenue / 282nd Street southwest of Platte
- North end: SD 44 / SD 50 southeast of Academy

Pierre–Forest City segment
- Length: 57.014 mi (91.755 km)
- South end: US 14 / US 83 in Pierre
- Major intersections: SD 204 near Pierre; US 212 southeast of Forest City to east-northeast of Forest City
- North end: 296th Avenue / 160th Street near Forest City

Glenham–Pollock segment
- Length: 57.900 mi (93.181 km)
- South end: 135th Street near Glenham
- Major intersections: US 12 / SD 20 east of Mobridge to Mobridge; SD 10 in Pollock
- North end: ND 1804 at the North Dakota state line northwest of Pollock

Location
- Country: United States
- State: South Dakota
- Counties: Charles Mix, Hughes, Sully, Potter, Walworth, Campbell

Highway system
- South Dakota State Trunk Highway System; Interstate; US; State
← SD 514	→ SD 1806

South Dakota Highway 1804 (SD 1804) is a 126.745-mile-long (203.976 km) state highway in the U.S. state of South Dakota.

It consists of four disconnected segments. The southernmost segment is in the central part of Charles Mix County. It travels 3.792 miles (6.103 km) from the shore of the Missouri River south of Geddes north to an intersection with SD 50 also south of Geddes. The second segment is in the northwestern part of Charles Mix County. It travels 8.039 miles (12.938 km) from an intersection with 282nd Street southwest of Platte to an intersection with SD 44/SD 50 southeast of Academy. The third segment is in the central part of the state. It travels 57.014 miles (91.755 km) from an intersection with US 14/US 83 in Pierre north to an intersection with 160th Street north-northeast of Forest City. The fourth segment, which is the longest segment, travels 57.900 miles (93.181 km) from a continuation of 135th Street south-southeast of Glenham northward to the North Dakota state line. Here, it intersects 102nd Street and continues as ND 1804.

The segments from Pierre to US 212 and from Mobridge to the North Dakota state line are parts of the Lewis and Clark Trail. The number for SD 1804 and SD 1806 are numbered from the years of the Lewis and Clark Expedition.

The segment from Pierre to the Oahe Dam was previously SD 514 prior to 1975.

== Route description ==
=== Charles Mix County ===
The southern segment of SD 1804 begins on the eastern shore of the Missouri River, a few miles south of Geddes. It travels just to the east of the Spring Creek and Pease Creek recreation areas, before crossing over Spring Creek. It curves to the northeast and reaches its northern terminus, an intersection with SD 50.

Southwest of Platte, SD 1804 resumes at an intersection with 282nd Street east of Platte Creek Recreation Area. At this intersection, the highway utilizes 359th Avenue and travels in a due-north direction. It skirts along the southeastern part of the Gray State Public Shooting Area. It curves to the northeast and travels through the southern part of that area, crossing over Platte Creek in the process. It curves to the southwest, paralleling the creek and then curves back to the north. The highway then travels on the west side of the shooting area. A few miles later, it meets its northern terminus, an intersection with SD 44/SD 50. At this intersection, 359th Avenue continues to the north.

=== Hughes, Sully, and Potter counties ===
SD 1804 resumes again in the northern part of Pierre, at an intersection with US 14/US 83. It curves to a northeastward direction and travels along the eastern edge of the Tailrace Recreation Area. On the northern edge of the recreation area is an intersection with the eastern terminus of SD 204. The highway then slips between the East Shore and Overlook recreation areas. The highway curves to the north and crosses over Spring Creek. SD 1804 then passes the Spring Creek Recreation Area and enters Sully County.

It passes the Okobojo Creek Recreation Area before it meets Onida Road and 284th Avenue. Here, SD 1804 turns right and follows Onida Road on a due-east direction for approximately 6 miles (9.7 km). At an intersection with 291st Avenue, SD 1804 leaves Onida Road and turns left onto 291st Avenue. It travels on that road on a due-north direction. It curves back to the east for a short distance before encountering an intersection with 293rd Avenue and Agar Road. Here, the highway turns left onto 293rd Avenue and takes that road to the north. Approximately 3 miles (4.8 km) later, it enters Potter County.

SD 1804 continues to the north and crosses over Artichoke Creek and then intersects US 212 just southeast of Forest City. At this intersection, SD 1804 turns right onto US 212 and begins a concurrency with that highway. Here, 293rd Avenue continues to the north. US 212 and SD 1804 briefly travel concurrently to the east-northeast. When SD 1804 splits off, it resumes its due-north direction. It curves to the north-northeast and then back to the north. At an intersection with 160th Street, this segment of SD 1804 ends, and 296th Avenue continues to the north.

=== Walworth and Campbell counties ===
SD 1804 resumes as a continuation of 135th Street south-southeast of Glenham, just west of 135th Street's intersection with 297th Avenue. It travels in a due-west direction. Just east of the Missouri River, it curves to the north. Here, it becomes known as 294th Avenue. It passes the Thomas Bay Recreation Area and proceeds to an intersection with 130th Street, which leads to Glenham. Here, SD 1804 turns left and proceeds in a due-west direction on 130th Street, while 294th Avenue continues straight ahead. It curves to the northwest and crosses over some railroad tracks of BNSF Railway. It then curve back to the north and has an intersection with US 12/SD 20. The three highways travel concurrently to the west and enter Mobridge, where SD 1804 splits off onto 4th Avenue East. It travels to the north, passing Legion Memorial Park, and then leaves the city limits of Mobridge. It then passes Mobridge Municipal Airport, Greenwood Cemetery, and Oahe Hills Country Club. The highway curves around the northwestern part of the country club, becomes known as 126th Street, and heads to the east. A short distance later, it turns to the left and resumes its northward direction, while 126th street continues straight ahead. SD 1804 begins to head to the north-northeast, before curving to the east-southeast and east. At an intersection with 122nd Avenue and 295th Avenue, the highway turns left and again resumes its northward path. It curves to a due-east direction and encounters an intersection with 119th and 297th streets. Here, SD 1804 travels to the north. It curves to the north-northwest and then back to the north. It passes to the east of the West Pollock Recreation Area and enters the southwestern part of Pollock. At an intersection with 103rd Street, it turns right onto Summit Road and travels to the east. In the south-central part of Pollock, SD 1804 turns left and almost immediately meets the western terminus of SD 10 (Main Street). It curves to the north-northwest, passes the West Pollock Recreation Area Camp Ground, and then leaves the city limits of Pollock. It skirts along the northwestern edge of Lake Pocasse. At an intersection with the southern terminus of 299th Avenue, SD 1804 turns left onto 102nd Street and travels to the west-northwest. The highway curves to the north-northwest and reaches its northern terminus, an intersection with 102nd Street at the North Dakota state line. Here, the roadway continues as ND 1804.

== History ==
SD 1804, along with parts of SD 1806 and SD 204, were part of the original South Dakota Highway 514 (SD 514). The former SD 514 was removed when SD 1804 and SD 1806 were designated, and the remaining dam crossing portion of the highway was renumbered as SD 204 at that time. The section of highway between Pierre and Oahe Dam comprises SD 1804's portion.

== Major intersections ==
County	Location	mi	km	Destinations	Notes
Charles Mix		0.000	0.000	Shore of Missouri River	Southern terminus
Charles Mix		3.792	6.103	SD 50 – Geddes, Lake Andes	
Charles Mix	Gap in route				
Charles Mix		4.704	7.570	282nd Street / 359th Avenue south	Roadway continues as 359th Avenue.
Charles Mix		11.831	19.040	SD 44 / SD 50 (276th Street) / 359th Avenue north	Roadway continues as 359th Avenue.
Gap in route
Hughes	Pierre	11.839	19.053	US 14 / US 83 to US 14 Truck west / US 83 Truck south – Pierre, Highmore	
Hughes		19.130	30.787	SD 204 west	Eastern terminus of SD 204
Sully	No major junctions				
Potter		64.527	103.846	US 212 west / 293rd Avenue north – Eagle Butte, Gettysburg	Southern end of US 212 concurrency; roadway continues as 293rd Avenue.
Potter		65.218	104.958	US 212 east (164th Street) – Gettysburg	Northern end of US 212 concurrency
Potter		68.825	110.763	160th Street / 296th Avenue north	Roadway continues as 296th Avenue
Gap in route
Walworth		68.845	110.795	135th Street east	Roadway continues as 135th Street
Walworth		81.244	130.750	US 12 east / SD 20 east – Selby	Southern end of US 12/SD 20 concurrency
Walworth	Mobridge	81.314	130.862	US 12 west / SD 20 west (East Grand Crossing)	Northern end of US 12/SD 20 concurrency
Campbell	Pollock	117.772	189.536	SD 10 east (Main Street)	Western terminus of SD 10
Campbell		126.745	203.976	ND 1804 north / 102nd Street	Northern terminus; continuation into North Dakota
1.000 mi = 1.609 km; 1.000 km = 0.621 mi: Concurrency terminus
