= North Dakota Highway 1806 =

Highway in North Dakota

North Dakota Highway 1806
- ND 1806 highlighted in red

Route information
- Maintained by NDDOT
- Length: 130.75 mi (210.42 km)
- Tourist routes: Lewis and Clark Trail; Native American Scenic Byway

Sioux–Morton segment
- Length: 54.610 mi (87.886 km)
- South end: SD 1806 at the North Dakota/South Dakota border
- Major intersections: ND 24 near Cannon Ball, North Dakota; I-94 in Mandan
- North end: Oliver–Morton county line near Mandan

Lake Sakakawea segment
- Length: 41.918 mi (67.460 km)
- South end: ND 8 near Halliday
- North end: ND 200 near Pick City

Charlson segment
- Length: 8.208 mi (13.209 km)
- South end: ND 23 near Charlson
- North end: CR 2/55 near Charlson

Tobacco Gardens segment
- Length: 26.014 mi (41.865 km)
- South end: ND 23 near Watford City
- North end: Tobacco Gardens Creek Recreation Area

Location
- Country: United States
- State: North Dakota
- Counties: Dunn, McKenzie, Mercer, Morton, Oliver, Sioux

Highway system
- North Dakota State Highway System; Interstate; US; State
| ← ND 1804 | → ND 1 |

North Dakota Highway 1806 (ND 1806) is a state highway in the U.S. state of North Dakota. ND 1806 and ND 1804 were named to reflect the years of Lewis and Clark's travels through the area, and run along the southwest and northeast sides of the Missouri River, respectively. ND 1806 consists of four separate segments, running along Lake Sakakawea and the Missouri River in McKenzie, Dunn, Mercer, Oliver, Morton, and Sioux Counties.

Within the Standing Rock Sioux Reservation in Sioux County, ND 1806 forms the northern segment of the Native American Scenic Byway, a national scenic byway. Other sections of the highway are known as part of the Lewis and Clark Trail.

== Route description ==
The westernmost segment begins east of Watford City on North Dakota Highway 23, and runs north its northern terminus at the Tobacco Gardens Recreation Area on the southern shore of Lake Sakakawea. The next segment of ND 1806 begins a few miles east-southeast of Tobacco Gardens and heads east before turning south and passing through Charlson. The southern end of this segment also ends at ND 23. The third segment runs east–west, and begins at ND 8 between Halliday and Twin Buttes. This segment parallels the southern shore of Lake Sakakawea before ending at ND 200 southwest of Pick City. The fourth and final segment of ND 1806 is largely north–south, with its northern end near the Oliver-Morton county border north of Mandan and Harmon. The highway intersects Interstate 94 and passes through downtown Mandan before following the Missouri River south through Morton County and onto the Standing Rock Sioux Reservation. The highway is concurrent with North Dakota Highway 24 for much of its length in Sioux County, and breaks with Highway 24 north of the North Dakota/South Dakota border. After entering South Dakota, the highway continues as South Dakota Highway 1806.

== History ==
In October 2016, protest activity on the Standing Rock Sioux Reservation related to the Dakota Access Pipeline caused the highway to be shut down indefinitely between ND 24 and Fort Rice by the Morton County Sheriff's Department. The Backwater Bridge on ND 1806 served as the site of conflict between protesters and law enforcement, with protesters barricading themselves on the bridge and burning cars.

== Major intersections ==
=== Sioux–Morton segment ===
| County | Location | mi | km | Destinations | Notes |
|---|---|---|---|---|---|
| Sioux | Cannon Ball | 31.190 | 50.195 | ND 24 / Lewis and Clark Trail – Fort Yates, Solen | Southern terminus; ND 24 south provides access to SD 1806 |
| Morton | Mandan | 70.086 | 112.792 | Main Street west (I-94 BL west) | Southern end of BL 94 overlap |
| Morton | Mandan | 70.548 | 113.536 | I-94 BL east (Memorial Highway) | Northern end of BL 94 overlap |
| Morton | Mandan | 71.225 | 114.626 | I-94 – Billings, Bismarck | I-94 exit 153 |
| Morton | East Morton | 85.800 | 138.082 | Lewis and Clark Trail / River Road | Continuation unpaved into Oliver County beyond northern terminus |
1.000 mi = 1.609 km; 1.000 km = 0.621 mi: Concurrency terminus

=== Lake Sakakawea segment ===
| County | Location | mi | km | Destinations | Notes |
|---|---|---|---|---|---|
| Dunn | Unorganized Territory of Halliday | 181.918 | 292.769 | ND 8 / Lewis and Clark Trail – Twin Buttes, Halliday | Western terminus |
| Mercer | East Mercer | 140.000 | 225.308 | ND 200 / Lewis and Clark Trail | Eastern terminus |
1.000 mi = 1.609 km; 1.000 km = 0.621 mi

=== Charlson segment ===
The entire section is in McKenzie County.

| Location | mi | km | Destinations | Notes |
|---|---|---|---|---|
| Hawkeye Township | 266.000 | 428.086 | ND 23 / Lewis and Clark Trail – New Town, Watford City | Southern terminus |
| Elm Tree Township | 274.208 | 441.295 | CR 55 / Lewis and Clark Trail | Northern terminus |
1.000 mi = 1.609 km; 1.000 km = 0.621 mi

=== Tobacco Gardens segment ===
The entire section is in McKenzie County.

| Location | mi | km | Destinations | Notes |
|---|---|---|---|---|
| Watford City | 311.577 | 501.435 | ND 23 / ND 23 Bus. | Southern terminus, eastern terminus of ND 23 Bus. |
| Watford City | 311.315 | 501.013 | ND 23 Bus. west / Lewis and Clark Trail | Northern end of ND 23 Bus. concurrency |
| Twin Valley Township | 285.563 | 459.569 | CR 2 / Lewis and Clark Trail | Northern terminus |
1.000 mi = 1.609 km; 1.000 km = 0.621 mi: Concurrency terminus
