= U.S. Route 83 in South Dakota =

Section of U.S. Highway in South Dakota, United States

U.S. Highway 83
- US 83 highlighted in red

Route information
- Maintained by SDDOT
- Length: 240.36 mi (386.82 km)
- Existed: 1926–present

Major junctions
- South end: US 83 near Olsonville
- US 18 in Mission; I-90 from Murdo to Vivian; US 14 from Fort Pierre to Blunt; US 212 near Gettysburg; US 12 near Selby
- North end: US 83 near Herreid

Location
- Country: United States
- State: South Dakota
- Counties: Todd, Mellette, Jones, Stanley, Hughes, Sully, Potter, Walworth, Campbell

Highway system
- United States Numbered Highway System; List; Special; Divided; South Dakota State Trunk Highway System; Interstate; US; State
← US 81	→ US 85

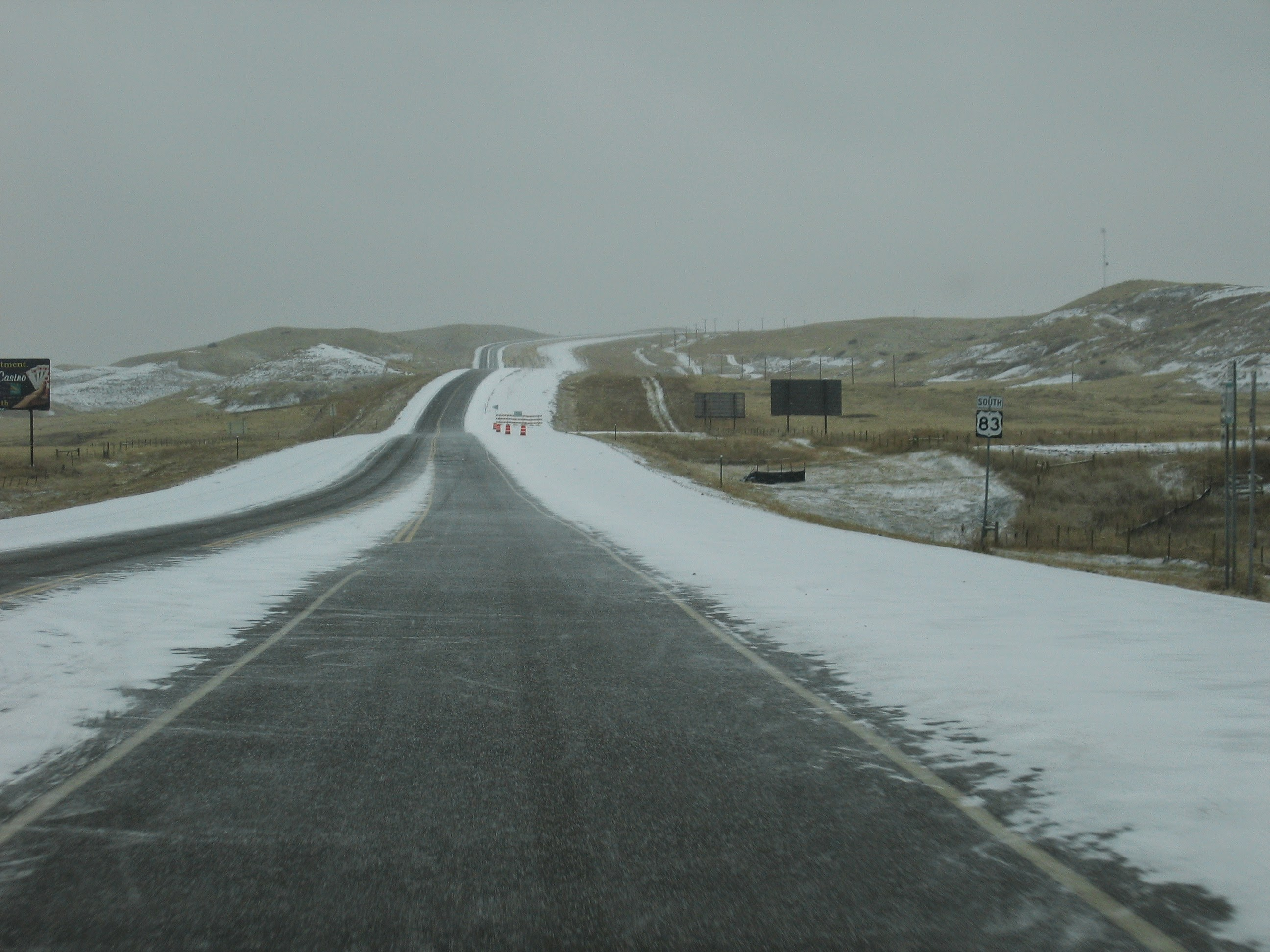
Southbound US 83 in Fort Pierre

U.S. Highway 83, part of the United States Numbered Highway System, runs from the Mexican border in Brownsville, Texas, to the Canadian border near Westhope, North Dakota. In the state of South Dakota, it runs from Olsonville to Herreid by way of Mission, Murdo, and Gettysburg. The route also runs through the capital Pierre as well as its suburb Fort Pierre. For much of its length, US 83 runs through rural areas, passing through the badlands and small portions of the Black Hills of the state.

== Route description ==
US 83 enters South Dakota just south of Olsonville, into Todd County, where it also enters the Rosebud Indian Reservation. It passes through extremely deserted grassland without any sort of development on the road. After a couple of miles, it reaches Mission, where it meets US 18 (Second Street). Here, US 83 turns left on to US 18 and the two routes begin a rather short concurrency lasting for approximately 3 miles (4.8 km). Through Mission, US 18/83 passes through generally moderate development and businesses along the road, before the route begins to become rural once again after exiting Mission.

US 83 splits off from US 18 and turns northward, while US 18 continues west. US 83 continues north through dry, sandy plains with no development once again. It passes several cemeteries, as well as a church, and later the Horse Creek Community Center. After passing the community center, South Dakota Highway 44 intersects US 83 and enters a concurrency with it. In White River, SD 44 leaves US 83. US 83 passes through grassy farmland and crosses the Little White River on a bridge. Shortly after that, it enters Mellette County. US 83 then crosses the main branch of the White River and reaches the unincorporated community of Westover. It continues to go through sparse development. Just outside of Murdo, the hills become more flat as US 83 passes by the Murdo Municipal Airport. The development increases when US 83 reaches Murdo and passes by a dam and another cemetery. In Murdo, it meets I-90 and turns right on to the interstate, forming one of its few concurrencies with an interstate highway. Meanwhile one of I-90's business routes continues into downtown Murdo. In November 2022, a project to add new asphalt surfacing on the road as well as a shared-use path from White River to Murdo was completed by the South Dakota Department of Transportation.

As US 83 enters its concurrency with I-90, they pass through several grassy and sandy farmland with very little development along the road. They also parallel a road to the north of them which several of the exits are signed for. At exit 212 near Vivian, US 83 leaves I-90 and intersects the northern terminus of a northern segment of South Dakota Highway 53. US 83 then heads north along an unsigned business route of I-90, passing a gas station and weigh station. It then passes through more rural farmland with only slight development along the road.

It then enters Stanley County and development increases a bit, though still sparse, reaching Fort Pierre. US 83 increases to four lanes and heads along the streets of the city, meeting US 14. It turns slightly northeast while US 14 turns left, beginning a concurrency as the two routes cross the Missouri River and enter Hughes County where they also reach the city limits of Pierre, one of the few capitals not served by any interstate highway.

In Pierre, the routes keep four lanes while passing through rather large development such as hotels, restaurants, and businesses. After about a couple of blocks, the two routes make several awkward turns to exit Pierre; they turn north on to Pierre Street, east on Pleasant Avenue, and north again on Euclid Avenue, while their truck routes continue through the city. After exiting Pierre, the two routes head through somewhat suburban development but expand the road. The lanes remain the same while the median becomes larger, being grass-lined.

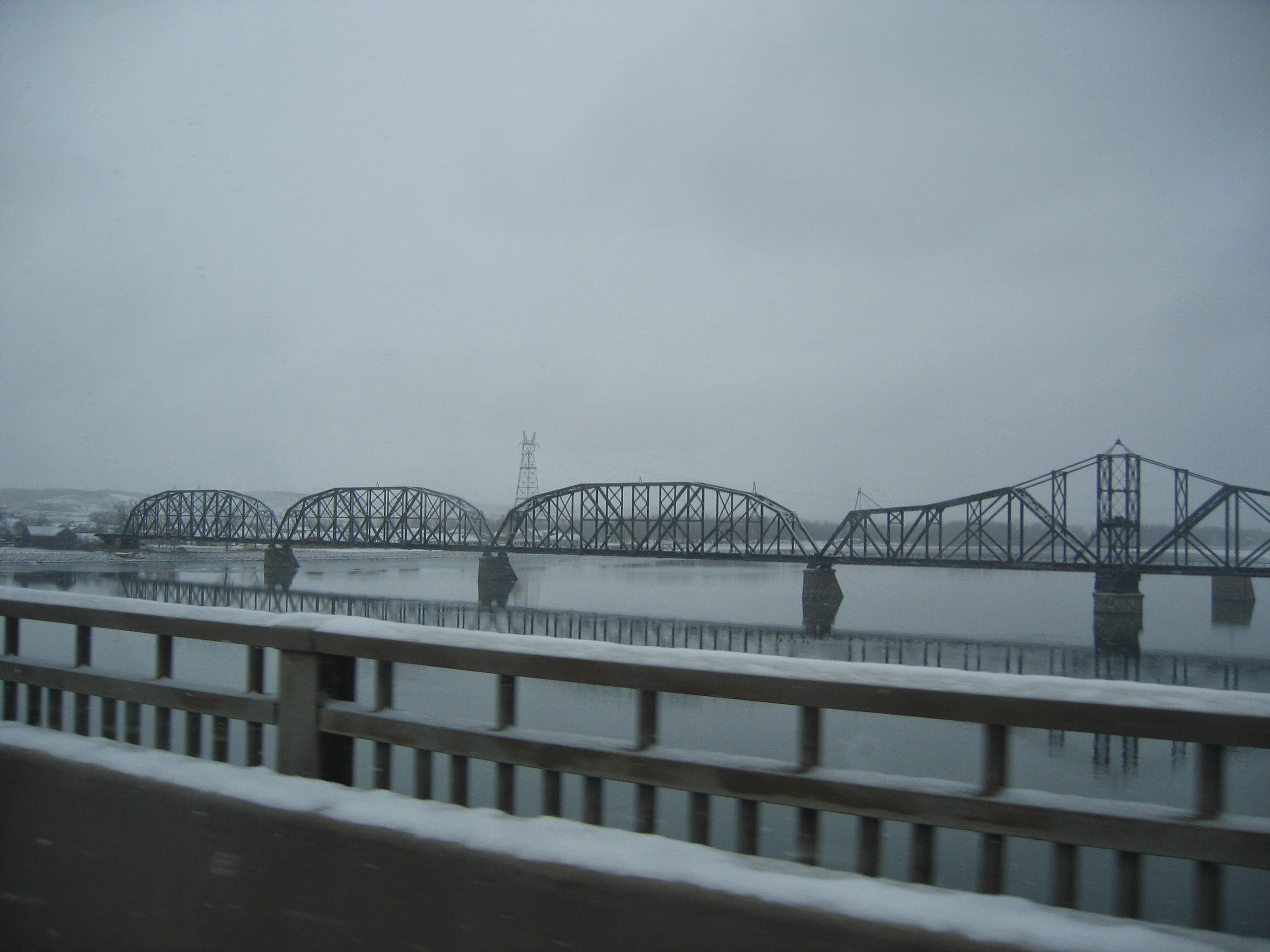
The Missouri River Bridge in Pierre

Near Blunt, US 83 turns north, leaving US 14. It enters Sully County, passing through a mix of grassy and sandy farmland with a sprinkle of development near Onida. It also passes through Agar, entering Potter County, and passing through Gorman before meeting US 212 near Gettysburg. US 212 merges on to US 83 to form a very short concurrency before US 83 leaves US 212 by turning north to avoid the main district.

Another couple miles pass by before US 83 meets its next concurrency, South Dakota Highway 20. The two routes stay concurrent for a while, before they enter Walworth County and pick up another concurrency, this time with US 12. The three routes make their way to downtown Selby with more industrial businesses and shops lining the road. After exiting Selby, US 83 departs the concurrency by turning north one last time.

US 83 then continues on its way, passing through more grassy fields as well as a few marshes being dotted along the side as it enters its final county in the state, Campbell County. The last stretches of development along its route are Mound City and Herreid before US 83 enters North Dakota at Emmons County.

The South Dakota section of US 83, with the exception of all of its concurrencies, is legally defined at South Dakota Codified Laws § 31-4-180.

== History ==
Historically, US 83 did not exist in South Dakota. When it was first established in 1926, it initially ran from the Canadian border to the South Dakota state line. Later on, US 83 was extended to Pierre. South of Pierre, US 83 followed an old route that went further east; this route is now present day US 183. A portion of US 83 also runs on the Native American Scenic Byway.

== Future ==
As of February 2024, the bridge between Fort Pierre and Pierre is said to be in deterioration and will be replaced with a stronger, sturdier, bridge that would provide more support than the old one and have extra features as well as allow all traffic to flow smoothly. The project is slated for total completion in 2025, while in the four phases, it is currently in the second one.

== Major intersections ==
County	Location	mi	km	Exit	Destinations	Notes
Todd		0.0	0.0		US 83 south – Valentine	Continuation into Nebraska
Todd	Mission	22.1	35.6		US 18 east (2nd Street) – Winner	Southern end of US 18 overlap
Todd		25.2	40.6		US 18 west – Rosebud, Martin	Northern end of US 18 overlap
Mellette		41.4	66.6		SD 44 east – Wood	Southern end of SD 44 overlap
Mellette	White River	43.8	70.5		SD 44 west – Cedar Butte	Northern end of SD 44 overlap
Jones	Murdo	67.3	108.3		I-90 west / I-90 BL west – Belvidere, Murdo	Southern end of I-90 overlap; I-90 exit 192
Jones	Draper	75.3	121.2	201	Draper	
Jones	Mussman Township	82.4	132.6	208	No name exit	County road S10
Jones		87.3	140.5		I-90 east / I-90 BL west / SD 53 south to SD 44 – Presho	Northern end of I-90 overlap; northern terminus of SD 53; southern end of unsigned I-90 BL overlap; I-90 exit 212
Jones		88.1	141.8		I-90 BL east	Northern end of unsigned I-90 BL overlap
Stanley	Fort Pierre	117.4	188.9		SD 1806 south	Southern end of SD 1806 overlap
Stanley	Fort Pierre	120.6	194.1		US 14 / SD 34 west / SD 1806 north (Yellowstone Street)	Southern end of US 14/SD 34 overlap; northern end of SD 1806 overlap
Missouri River		120.9	194.6	Missouri River Bridge		
Hughes	Pierre	121.2	195.1		US 14 Truck east / US 83 Truck north / SD 34 east (Sioux Avenue)	Northern end of SD 34 overlap
Hughes	Pierre	124.5	200.4		US 14 Truck west / US 83 Truck south (Garfield Avenue)	
Hughes	Blunt	139.5	224.5		US 14 east – Huron	Northern end of US 14 overlap
Sully	No major junctions					
Potter	Gettysburg	174.1	280.2		US 212 west – Eagle Butte	Southern end of US 212 overlap
Potter	Gettysburg	175.3	282.1		US 212 east – Gettysburg	Northern end of US 212 overlap
Walworth		191.8	308.7		SD 20 east – Hoven	Southern end of SD 20 overlap
Walworth	Selby	206.3	332.0		US 12 east – Ipswich	Southern end of US 12 overlap
Walworth	Selby	212.8	342.5		US 12 / SD 20 west – Mobridge	Northern end of US 12/SD 20 overlap
Campbell		228.1	367.1		SD 10 east – Eureka	Southern end of SD 10 overlap
Campbell	Herreid	238.4	383.7		SD 10 west – Pollock	Northern end of SD 10 overlap
Campbell	Herreid	240.36	386.82		US 83 north – Linton	Continuation into North Dakota
1.000 mi = 1.609 km; 1.000 km = 0.621 mi: Concurrency terminus
