= South Dakota Highway 204 =

State Highway in South Dakota

Highway 204
- SD 204 highlighted in red

Route information
- Maintained by SDDOT
- Length: 2.131 mi (3.430 km)
- Existed: 1975–present

Major junctions
- West end: SD 1806 near Fort Pierre
- East end: SD 1804 near Pierre

Location
- Country: United States
- State: South Dakota
- Counties: Stanley, Hughes

Highway system
- South Dakota State Trunk Highway System; Interstate; US; State
← SD 203	→ SD 214

South Dakota Highway 204 (SD 204) is a short 2.131-mile-long (3.430 km) east-west state highway in central South Dakota. It serves as a crossing of the Missouri River, running directly overtop of the Oahe Dam.

== Route description ==
SD 204 begins in Stanley County at an intersection between SD 1806 and an access road, which leads to some of the dam's facilities as well as the Oahe Downstream Recreation Area, located at the base of the dam near one of the spillways. The highway climbs up a gradual grade as it curves northeastward, climbing up to the very top of the dam, where it has a y-intersection with a service road. SD 204 run due northeast directly across the dam for nearly 1.5 miles, offering views of the lake and the valley below as it crosses into Hughes County at the site of the original Missouri River basin, before having an intersection with an access road to the power house and pulling away from the dam. The highway passes by the historic Oahe Chapel before coming to an end at an intersection with SD 1804 several miles north of Pierre.

The entire length of South Dakota Highway 204 is a rural, two-lane, state highway.

== History ==
SD 204, along with parts of SD 1806 and SD 1804, were part of the original South Dakota Highway 514 (SD 514). This all changed in 1975, when the former SD 514 was removed when SD 1804 and SD 1806 were designated, with the remaining dam crossing portion of the highway renumbered as SD 204 at that time.

== Major intersections ==
County	Location	mi	km	Destinations	Notes
Stanley		0.000	0.000	SD 1806 – Fort Pierre, Mission Ridge	Western terminus
Hughes		2.131	3.430	SD 1804 (Lewis and Clark Trail) – Pierre, Onida, Forest City	Eastern terminus
1.000 mi = 1.609 km; 1.000 km = 0.621 mi
