= North Dakota Highway 6 =

State highway in North Dakota, US

North Dakota Highway 6

Route information
- Maintained by NDDOT
- Length: 67.143 mi (108.056 km)
- Existed: 1939–present

Major junctions
- South end: SD 63 north of McLaughlin, SD
- North end: I-94 BL in Mandan

Location
- Country: United States
- State: North Dakota
- Counties: Sioux, Morton

Highway system
- North Dakota State Highway System; Interstate; US; State
← ND 5	→ ND 8

North Dakota Highway 6 (ND 6) is a 67.143-mile-long (108.056 km) major north–south highway in North Dakota. It runs from South Dakota Highway 63 in McLaughlin to Interstate 94 Business Loop in downtown Mandan.

== Route description ==
ND 6 begins at the South Dakota state line, where the roadway continues as South Dakota Highway 63. It has two intersections with ND 24. In between the two intersections with that highway travels through Selfridge. North of there, it travels by Breien, and later encounters the eastern terminus of ND 21 turning right at that intersection before making a sharp left curve and heading north again. At the intersection with Morton County Road 136 it travels by Saint Anthony, then travels along the west side of the Morton County State Game Management Area. A sign that the highway is approaching its northern terminus is when it passes the Mandan Municipal Airport. The highway doesn't officially enter Mandan, until roughly around 19th Street, and from there it passes by a United States Department of Agriculture (USDA) lab, and a local youth corrections center. It then crosses a bridge over the Heart River, where on the other side it becomes 10th Avenue and cuts through the Mandan Municipal Golf Course. Immediately after a bridge over the BNSF Railway (BNSF) Mandan Rail Yard, ND 6 ends at Interstate 94 Business Loop (BL 94), although 10th Avenue continues northbound as a local residential city street.

== Major intersections ==
County	Location	mi	km	Destinations	Notes
Sioux		0.000	0.000	SD 63 south – McLaughlin	Southern terminus; continues into South Dakota as SD 63.
Sioux		6.104	9.823	ND 24 north – Fort Yates	Southern terminus of southern segment of ND 24
Sioux		34.894	56.156	ND 24 east – Solen	Western terminus of northern segment of ND 24
Morton		42.149	67.832	ND 21 west / 24 Avenue north – Flasher, Carson	Eastern terminus of ND 21; southern terminus of 24 Avenue
Morton	Mandan	67.143	108.056	I-94 BL (Main Street West)	Northern terminus; continues as 10th Avenue West
1.000 mi = 1.609 km; 1.000 km = 0.621 mi
