= South Dakota Highway 1806 =

State highway in the U.S. state of South Dakota

Highway 1806
- SD 1806 highlighted in red

Route information
- Maintained by SDDOT
- Existed: 1975–present

Southern Gregory County segment
- South end: US 18 near Bonesteel
- North end: Mule Head Road

Northern Gregory County segment
- South end: Old 1806 Road south / Lakeview Drive
- North end: SD 44 west of Platte

Lyman–Stanley Counties segment
- Length: 122.603 mi (197.310 km)
- South end: SD 273 north of Kennebec
- Major intersections: US 14 / US 83 / SD 34 in Fort Pierre
- North end: Minneconjou Road near Mission Ridge

Corson County segment
- South end: 280 Avenue southwest of Mobridge
- Major intersections: US 12 / SD 20 northeast of Mobridge
- North end: BIA Rd. 3 to ND 1806 in Kenel

Location
- Country: United States
- State: South Dakota
- Counties: Gregory, Lyman, Stanley, Corson

Highway system
- South Dakota State Trunk Highway System; Interstate; US; State
← SD 1804	→ SD 1889

South Dakota Highway 1806 (SD 1806) is a state highway in the U.S. state of South Dakota. It exists in four distinct sections. Its longest section begins at SD 273 and runs along the Missouri River nearly its whole length, serving Pierre. SD 1806 along with SD 1804 are numbered from the years of the Lewis and Clark Expedition.

== Route description ==
=== Lyman and Stanley Counties ===
SD 1806 begins at the northern terminus of SD 273 in Lyman County and begins heading northwest. The route remains a two lane road and follows the Missouri River, heading towards Pierre. As it nears Pierre, the route becomes concurrent with US 83 and enters Fort Pierre. At the north end of Fort Pierre, US 83 becomes concurrent with US 14 heading east while SD 1806 splits from US 83 and becomes concurrent with US 14 and SD 34 for nearly a mile, heading west from the Deadwood Street and Yellowstone Street intersection. After one mile of concurrency, SD 1806 splits from US 14/SD 34 and heads north, passing by the Fort Pierre Chouteau National Historic Landmark and remaining parallel with the Missouri River. It then passes by Lake Oahe, intersecting the west end of SD 204 which passes over the Oahe Dam. SD 1806 continues west and remains parallel with the Missouri River until reaching Sansarc Road. The route continues northwest and ends at an intersection with Minneconjou Road south of Mission Ridge.

== History ==
A portion of SD 1806 near Lake Oahe was numbered as SD 514. It was later redesignated into parts of SD 1804, SD 204, and part of today's portion of SD 1806.

== Major intersections ==
County	Location	mi	km	Destinations	Notes
Gregory		15.68	25.23	US 18	Southern terminus; road continues unpaved as 361 Avenue
Gregory		23.86	38.40	Old 1806 Road north	To SD 1806 (Northern Gregory County segment)
Gregory		25.75	41.44	Mule Head Road	Continuation beyond northern terminus of southern segment
Gregory	Gap in route				
Gregory		37.88	60.96	Old 1806 Road south / Lakeview Drive	Southern terminus of northern segment; road continues east as Lakeview Dr.; Old 1806 Rd. provides access to SD 1806 (Southern Gregory County segment)
Gregory		48.55	78.13	SD 44	Northern terminus
Gap in route
Lyman	Lower Brule Indian Reservation	138.45	222.81	SD 273 south / Lewis and Clark Trail	Southern terminus; northern terminus of SD 273; road continues east as Medicine Bull Memorial Highway (Iron Nation Road)
Stanley	Fort Pierre	180.05 116.94	289.76 188.20	US 83 south	Southern end of US 83 concurrency; mileposts change to reflect US 83 mileage
Stanley	Fort Pierre	138.73 227.73	223.26 366.50	US 14 / SD 34 east / US 83 north / Lewis and Clark Trail – Pierre	Northern end of US 83 concurrency; southern end of US 14/SD 34 concurrency; mileposts change to reflect US 14 mileage
Stanley	Fort Pierre	226.86 186.46	365.10 300.08	US 14 / SD 34 west – Philip	Northern end of US 14/SD 34 concurrency; mileposts change to reflect SD 1806 mileage
Stanley		191.60	308.35	SD 204 east to SD 1804	Western terminus of SD 204
Stanley		221.05	355.75	Minneconjou Road	Continuation beyond northern terminus
Gap in route
Corson		359.75	578.96	280 Avenue	Continuation beyond southern terminus
Corson		363.43	584.88	US 12 / SD 20 west / Lewis and Clark Trail	Southern end of US 12/SD 20 concurrency
Corson		364.61	586.78	US 12 / SD 20 east – Mobridge	Northern end of US 12/SD 20 concurrency
Corson		370.13	595.67	SD 1806 Spur north – Wakpala	Southern terminus of unsigned SD 1806 Spur
Corson	Kenel	386.83	622.54	BIA Rd. 3 / Lewis and Clark Trail	Continuation beyond northern terminus; to ND 1806
1.000 mi = 1.609 km; 1.000 km = 0.621 mi: Concurrency terminus

== Wakpala spur ==
Highway 1806 Spur
- Location: Wakpala
- Length: 1.8 mi (2.9 km)

South Dakota Highway 1806 Spur (SD 1806P) is a 1.8-mile (2.9 km) long spur route of SD 1806. Although unsigned, it provides access to the town of Wakpala, South Dakota, located in the Standing Rock Indian Reservation.
