= South Dakota Highway 273 =

State highway in the U.S. state of South Dakota

Highway 273
- SD 273 highlighted in red

Route information
- Maintained by SDDOT
- Length: 12.723 mi (20.476 km)
- Existed: 1975–present

Major junctions
- South end: I-90 in Kennebec
- North end: SD 1806 in the Lower Brule Indian Reservation

Location
- Country: United States
- State: South Dakota
- Counties: Lyman

Highway system
- South Dakota State Trunk Highway System; Interstate; US; State
| ← SD 271 | → US 281 |

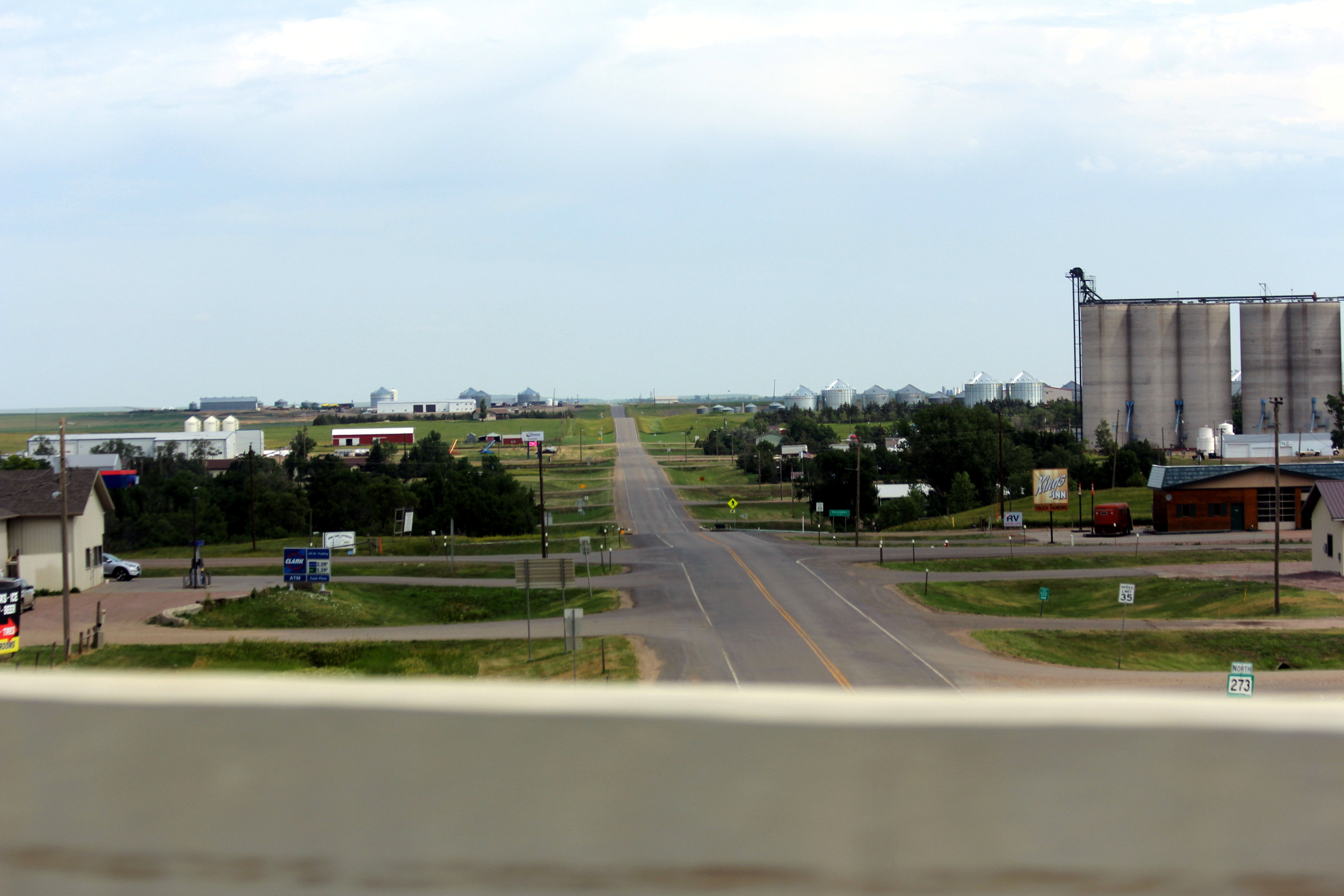
Looking north at SD273 from Interstate 90 at Kennebec

South Dakota Highway 273 (SD 273) is a 12.7-mile-long (20.4 km) north-south state highway in Lyman County, South Dakota. It serves as a connection to SD 1806, linking it with the town of Kennebec and Interstate 90 (I-90).

== Route description ==
SD 273 begins at an interchange with I-90 (exit 235); the road continues south as 315 Avenue. It heads north to enter the town of Kennebec, passing a couple of businesses as it almost immediately has an intersection with SD 248 (former US Highway 16). The highway crosses over a creek before passing along the western edge of downtown. SD 273 passes through some neighborhoods before leaving Kennebec and traveling north through flat farmland for the next several miles. The highway enters the Lower Brule Indian Reservation and comes to an end at Iron Nation Road, which consists of the southern terminus of SD 1806 and the western terminus of Bureau of Indian Affairs Highway 10 (Medicine Bull Memorial Highway). BIA 10 leads eastward towards the town of Lower Brule.

The entire length of South Dakota Highway 273 is a rural, two-lane, state highway, located entirely in Lyman County.

== History ==
SD 273 came about in 1975, when South Dakota renumbered many of its highways. Previously, this highway had been unnumbered.

== Major junctions ==
The entire route is in Lyman County.

| Location | mi | km | Destinations | Notes |
|---|---|---|---|---|
| Kennebec | 0.00 | 0.00 | I-90 – Presho, Reliance | Southern terminus; I-90 exit 235; road continues as 315 Avenue |
| Kennebec | 0.25 | 0.40 | SD 248 / Lewis and Clark Trail | Former US 16 |
| Lower Brule Indian Reservation | 12.75 | 20.52 | SD 1806 north (Iron Nation Road) / Lewis and Clark Trail | Northern terminus of SD 273; southern terminus of SD 1806; road continues unpaved as 315 Avenue |
1.000 mi = 1.609 km; 1.000 km = 0.621 mi
