= George Holland House =

Historic house in South Dakota, United States

- U.S. National Register of Historic Places
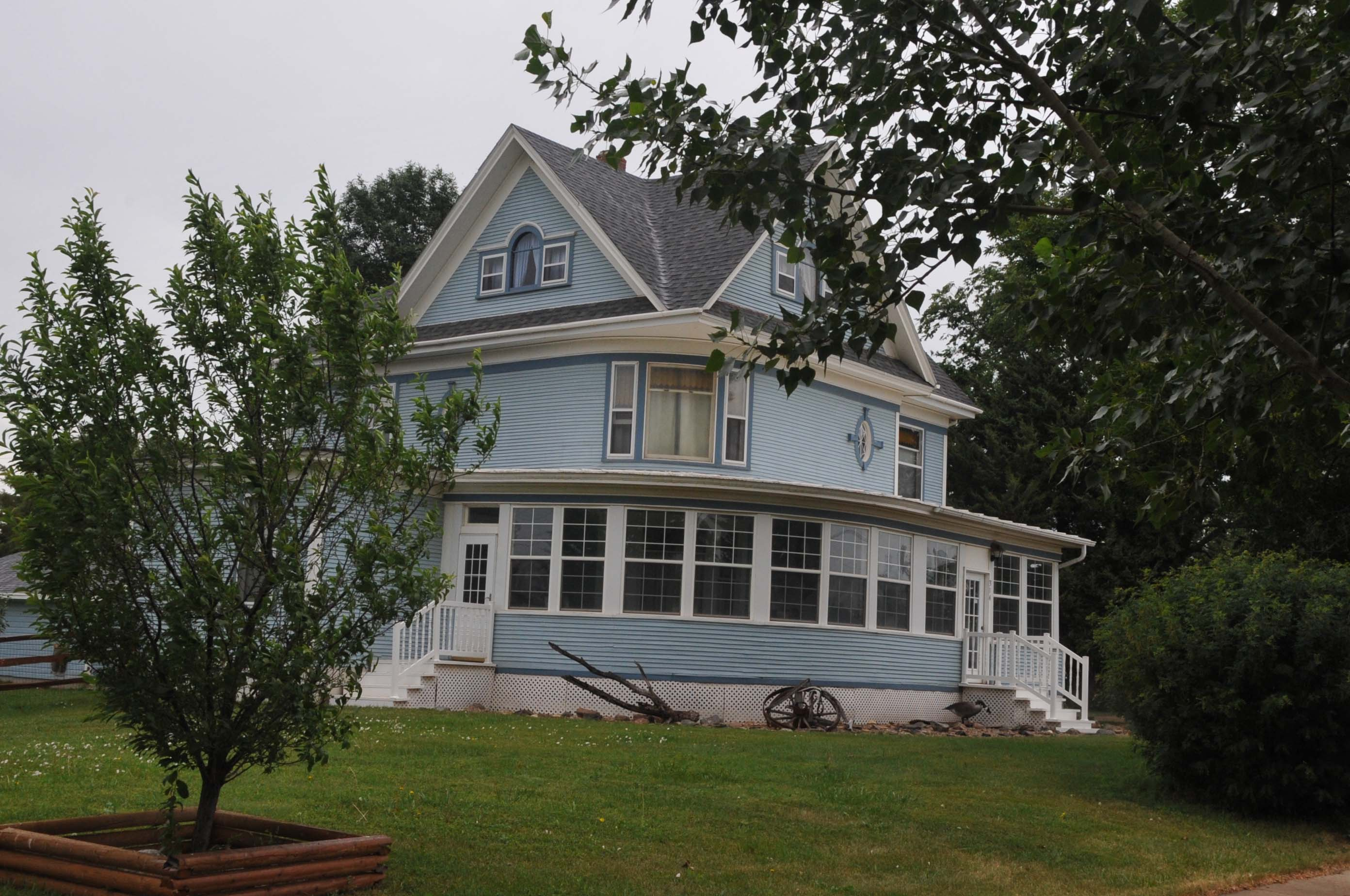
- Location: 314 N. Exene St., Gettysburg, South Dakota
- Coordinates: 45°00′52″N 99°57′20″W
- Area: less than one acre
- Built: 1904
- Architectural style: Queen Anne
- NRHP reference No.: 89001721
- Added to NRHP: October 19, 1989

The George Holland House, at 314 N. Exene St. in Gettysburg, South Dakota is a house with elements of Queen Anne style built in 1904. It was listed on the National Register of Historic Places in 1989.
