= D.H. and Leah Curran House =

Historic house in South Dakota, United States

- D. H. and Leah Curran House
- U.S. National Register of Historic Places
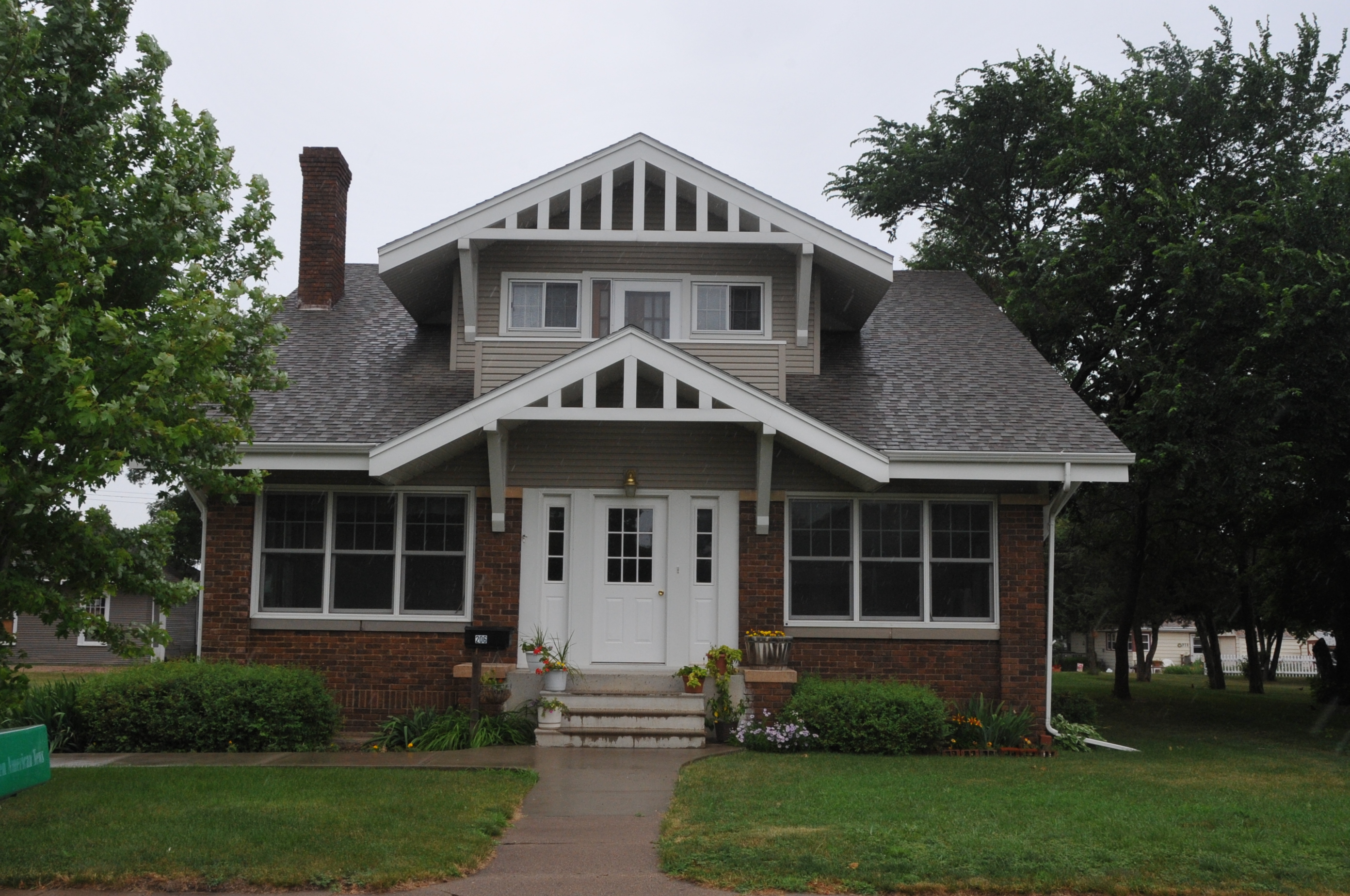

- Location within South Dakota Location within the United States
- Location: 206 S. Broadway, Gettysburg, South Dakota
- Coordinates: 45°00′36″N 99°56′59″W
- Area: less than one acre
- Built: 1924
- Architectural style: Bungalow/craftsman
- NRHP reference No.: 96000741
- Added to NRHP: July 5, 1996

The D.H. and Leah Curran House was listed on the National Register of Historic Places in 1996.

It is a one-and-a-half-story frame house on a concrete foundation. It was deemed

architecturally significant as a well-preserved local example of late Craftsman residential design. In South Dakota as well as elsewhere in the United States, residential architecture during the early twentieth century was heavily influenced by the Craftsman building form, an indigenous American style popularized through numerous pattern books and popular publications. In many areas of the country, simple variants of the Craftsman form saw near-universal use in working-class home construction during the 1910s and 1920s. Larger, high-style examples were less common, but still saw frequent use in many areas. Gettysburg generally followed this national design trend, and a number of small and mid-sized Craftsman homes remain in the community. The Curran house is a fine local example of the form, larger than most and with a high level of design detail. It remains today strongly reflective of the period in which it was built.

It has also been known as the Herbert G. Beath House and the Carl and Dorothy Cronin House.
