= Solen School District =

School district in South Dakota, US

Address
- 902 E Broadway Street Solen, North Dakota, 58570; United States

District information
- Type: Public
- Grades: PreK–12
- NCES District ID: 3816980

Students and staff
- Students: 209
- Teachers: 21.0
- Staff: 26.13
- Student–teacher ratio: 9.95

Other information
- Website: www.solen.k12.nd.us

Solen Public School District 3 is a school district headquartered in Solen, North Dakota.

It operates Cannon Ball Elementary School (K-8) in Cannon Ball and Solen High School in Solen.

Within Sioux County it serves Solen and almost all of Cannon Ball. The district also extends into Morton County.

== History ==
In July 2013 Justin Fryer was named the superintendent of the district.

In 2018 the Cannon Ball elementary building had a lack of insulation and bug infestation issues. That year the school district received a $5 million federal grant to rebuild the school.

In 2019 the State Auditor of North Dakota took over an audit that a private company was doing of the district to check if embezzlement has occurred. The state believed that $38,000 was stolen from the district.
