= St. Anthony of Padua Catholic Church (Hoven, South Dakota) =

Historic church in South Dakota, United States

- St. Bernard's Catholic Church
- U.S. National Register of Historic Places
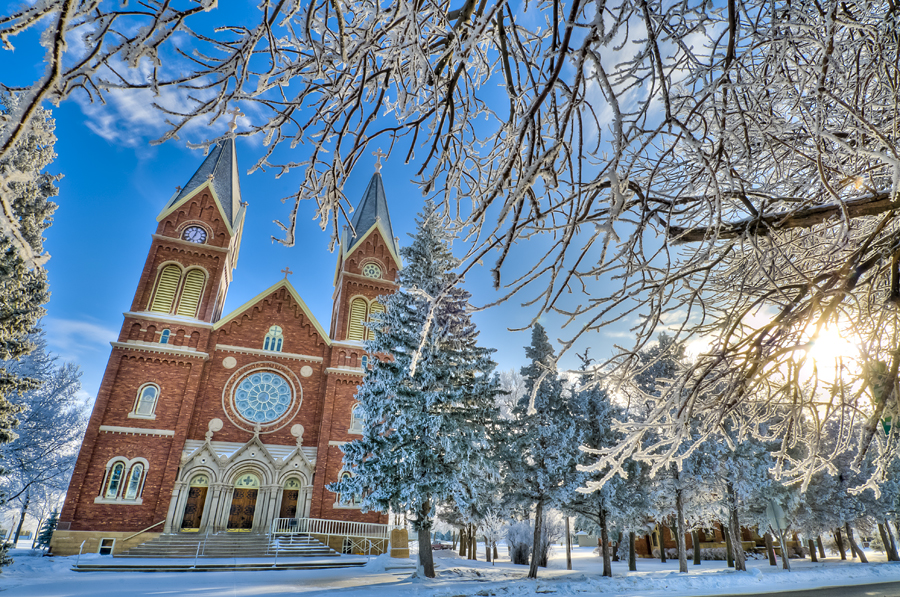
- St. Anthony’s in 2012

- Location within South Dakota Location within the United States
- Location: 546 Main St. Hoven, South Dakota
- Coordinates: 45°14′21″N 99°46′34″W
- Area: less than one acre
- Built: 1920–21
- Built by: Anton Zwak
- Architect: Anton Dohmen
- Architectural style: Neo-Romanesque Gothic
- NRHP reference No.: 80003731
- Added to NRHP: May 7, 1980

St. Anthony of Padua Church is a historic Catholic church in Hoven, South Dakota, within the Diocese of Sioux Falls. Nicknamed "the Cathedral of the Prairie" (though it has never technically been a cathedral), it is noted for its ornate Romanesque and Gothic Revival architecture, the cost and scale of which are unusual for a small rural town. It was added to the National Register of Historic Places in 1980 as St. Bernard's Catholic Church.

== History ==
The area, then part of Dakota Territory, was settled around 1883 by German immigrants, and the parish of St. Bernard was established to serve them. The first church, a wooden structure, was completed in 1888, and replaced by another in 1893.

The second wooden church was destroyed, along with much of the town, by a windstorm in 1917. Longtime pastor Msgr. Anthony Helmbrecht took the opportunity to construct a brick church inspired by those in his childhood Bavaria. By the time construction was completed in 1921, Helmbrecht had raised $500,000, enough to build a church with a capacity of 1,200 decorate it richly.

The church's interior paintings and plaster work was extensively restored in 1980s, mainly at the hands of local volunteers who trained in various restoration techniques and contributed some 20,000 hours of labor. The church continues to rely heavily on volunteers for upkeep.

== Architecture ==
Helmbrecht hired Bavarian-American architect Anton Dohmen of Milwaukee to design the church, reportedly modeled on one in Ruhmannsfelden, Bavaria. Dohmen's previous work included Church of St. Agnes in Vermillion, as well as the Church of Ss. Peter and Paul in Strasburg, North Dakota, the Church of St. Mary’s at Assumption Abbey in Richardton, North Dakota, and the Church of St. Andrew in LeRoy, Wisconsin. The construction contract was given to Anton Zwach, a German contractor from Dubuque, Iowa. Construction began in 1917 and continued for four years, after which the new church was rededicated to St. Anthony of Padua.

The church is a brick Neo-Romanesque-Gothic building with an ornate portal entrance surmounted by a rose window. It has two 120 feet (37 m) towers. The interior is a basilica plan which terminates in a rounded apse, with Corinthian-columned arcades separate the nave and side aisles. The vaulted ribbed ceilings are decorated with floral and geometric stenciling highlighted in gold leaf.

Church artwork references both the prairie setting of the church and the German ancestry of its parishioners; capitals are adorned with sunflowers and Saint Joseph is wearing a Bavarian hat. Of particular note are 31 stained glass windows, which depict the Assumption of Mary and the Flight into Egypt among other scenes.
