= G.L. Stocker Blacksmith Shop =

- G. L. Stocker Blacksmith Shop
- U.S. National Register of Historic Places
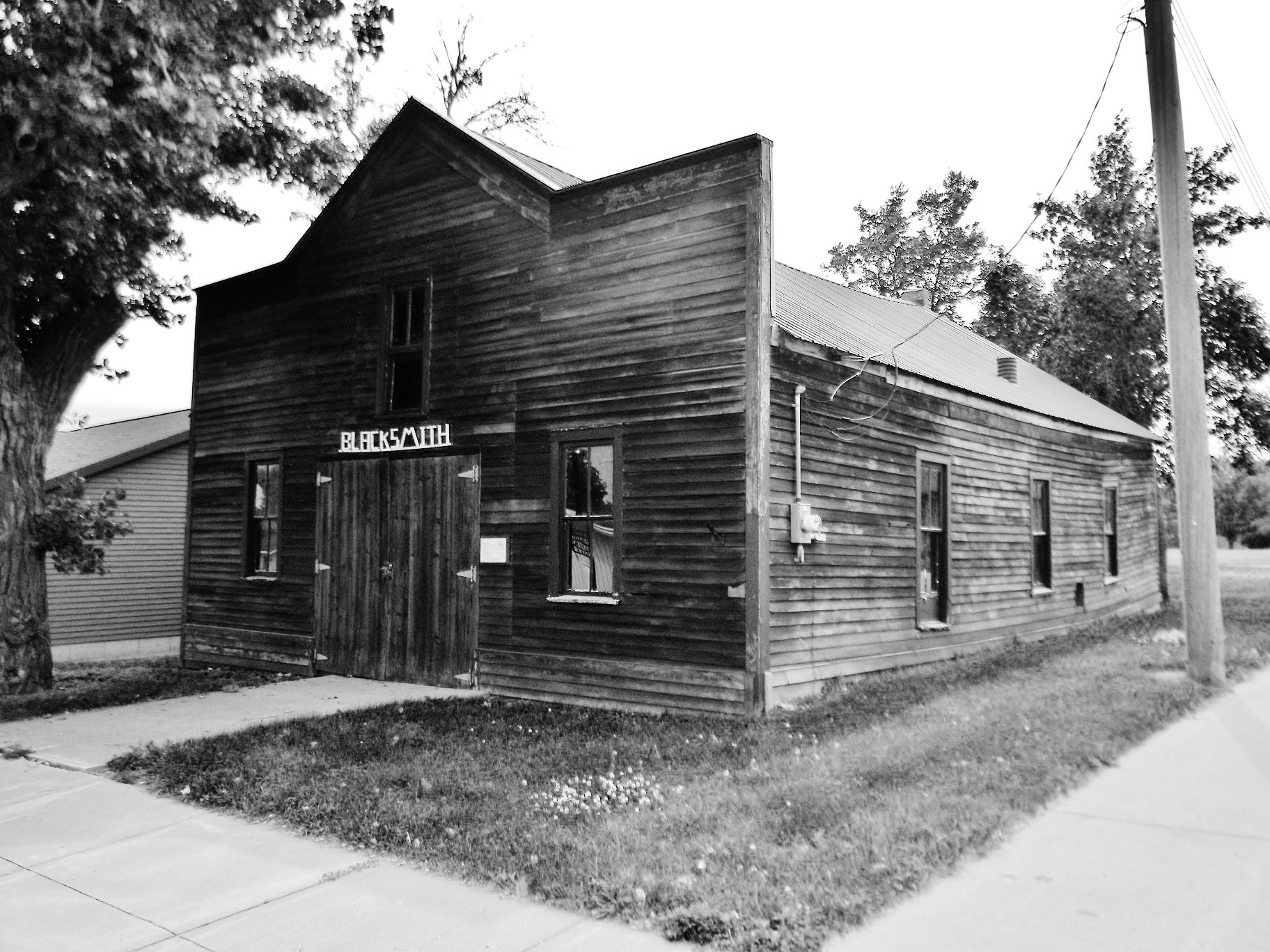

- Location within South Dakota Location within the United States
- Location: Main St., 2 blocks S of US 212, Gettysburg, South Dakota
- Coordinates: 45°00′40″N 99°57′25″W
- Area: less than one acre
- Built: 1901
- Built by: Hurley, Arthur
- Architectural style: false front
- NRHP reference No.: 96000744
- Added to NRHP: July 5, 1996

The G. L. Stocker Blacksmith Shop, in Gettysburg, South Dakota, was built in 1901. It was listed on the National Register of Historic Places in 1996.

It is located on Main St., two blocks south of U.S. Route 212. It has false front architecture. It has a main 32 by 48 feet (9.8 m × 14.6 m) section and a 12 by 29 feet (3.7 m × 8.8 m) addition to the rear.

It was built in 1901 for the Gettysburg chapter of the Women's Relief Corps (W.R.C.), a women's auxiliary organization to the Grand Army of the Republic (G.A.R.), and was known as Meade W.R.C. Hall. Meade Post No. 32 of the G.A.R. was established in Gettysburg in 1883.

It was bought in 1920 by George L. Stocker.
