= Herreid, South Dakota =

- City
- Seal

- Location in Campbell County and the state of South Dakota
- Coordinates: 45°50′16″N 100°04′29″W
- Country: United States
- State: South Dakota
- County: Campbell
- Founded: 1901
- Incorporated: 1912

Area
  - Total: 1.44 sq mi (3.72 km^{2})
  - Land: 1.44 sq mi (3.72 km^{2})
  - Water: 0 sq mi (0.00 km^{2})
- Elevation: 1,690 ft (520 m)

Population (2020)
  - Total: 416
  - Density: 290.0/sq mi (111.96/km^{2})
- Time zone: UTC-6 (Central (CST))
  - Summer (DST): UTC-5 (CDT)
- ZIP code: 57632
- Area code: 605
- FIPS code: 46-28340
- GNIS feature ID: 1267419
- Website: www.herreidsd.com

Herreid is a city in Campbell County, South Dakota, United States. The population was 416 at the 2020 census.

Herreid was under consideration to be named "Campa" for a time, however settlers considered other options. On August 26, 1901, Herreid was founded as a village. On September 13, 1901, the official plat was recorded.Herreid was laid out in 1901 when a branch of the Soo Line reached the city, and named after Charles N. Herreid, fourth Governor of South Dakota.

== Geography ==
According to the United States Census Bureau, the city has a total area of 1.39 square miles (3.60 km^{2}), all land. However, the neighborhoods have expanded beyond this.

U.S. Route 83 is the main thoroughfare, running from north to south through the town.

== Demographics ==
Historical population
Census	Pop.	Note	%±
1910	414		—
1920	460		11.1%
1930	544		18.3%
1940	592		8.8%
1950	633		6.9%
1960	767		21.2%
1970	672		−12.4%
1980	570		−15.2%
1990	488		−14.4%
2000	482		−1.2%
2010	438		−9.1%
2020	416		−5.0%
U.S. Decennial Census

=== 2020 census ===
As of the 2020 census, Herreid had a population of 416. The median age was 44.3 years, 25.7% of residents were under the age of 18, and 22.8% of residents were 65 years of age or older. For every 100 females there were 98.1 males, and for every 100 females age 18 and over there were 93.1 males age 18 and over.

0.0% of residents lived in urban areas, while 100.0% lived in rural areas.

There were 182 households in Herreid, of which 23.6% had children under the age of 18 living in them. Of all households, 53.3% were married-couple households, 19.8% were households with a male householder and no spouse or partner present, and 24.2% were households with a female householder and no spouse or partner present. About 39.6% of all households were made up of individuals and 28.6% had someone living alone who was 65 years of age or older.

There were 209 housing units, of which 12.9% were vacant. The homeowner vacancy rate was 4.1% and the rental vacancy rate was 0.0%.

Racial composition as of the 2020 census
Race	Number	Percent
White	372	89.4%
Black or African American	0	0.0%
American Indian and Alaska Native	15	3.6%
Asian	0	0.0%
Native Hawaiian and Other Pacific Islander	0	0.0%
Some other race	6	1.4%
Two or more races	23	5.5%
Hispanic or Latino (of any race)	16	3.8%

=== 2010 census ===
As of the census of 2010, there were 438 people, 213 households, and 115 families residing in the city. The population density was 315.1 inhabitants per square mile (121.7/km^{2}). There were 239 housing units at an average density of 171.9 per square mile (66.4/km^{2}). The racial makeup of the city was 97.5% White, 0.2% African American, 0.7% Native American, 0.2% Asian, and 1.4% from two or more races. Hispanic or Latino of any race were 2.5% of the population.

There were 213 households, of which 20.7% had children under the age of 18 living with them, 49.3% were married couples living together, 3.8% had a female householder with no husband present, 0.9% had a male householder with no wife present, and 46.0% were non-families. 40.4% of all households were made up of individuals, and 24.4% had someone living alone who was 65 years of age or older. The average household size was 2.06 and the average family size was 2.76.

The median age in the city was 49.3 years. 19.9% of residents were under the age of 18; 3.7% were between the ages of 18 and 24; 18.9% were from 25 to 44; 29.2% were from 45 to 64; and 28.3% were 65 years of age or older. The gender makeup of the city was 45.9% male and 54.1% female.

=== 2000 census ===
As of the 2000 census, there were 482 people, 207 households, and 137 families residing in the city. The population density was 356.3 inhabitants per square mile (137.6/km^{2}). There were 234 housing units at an average density of 173.0 per square mile (66.8/km^{2}). The racial makeup of the city was 99.59% White and 0.41% Native American.

There were 207 households, out of which 26.6% had children under the age of 18 living with them, 61.4% were married couples living together, 2.9% had a female householder with no husband present, and 33.8% were non-families. 32.9% of all households were made up of individuals, and 19.3% had someone living alone who was 65 years of age or older. The average household size was 2.33 and the average family size was 2.99.

In the city, the population was spread out, with 25.5% under the age of 18, 2.5% from 18 to 24, 25.9% from 25 to 44, 20.1% from 45 to 64, and 25.9% who were 65 years of age or older. The median age was 42 years. For every 100 females, there were 101.7 males. For every 100 females age 18 and over, there were 99.4 males.

The median income for a household in the city was $29,444, and the median income for a family was $40,000. Males had a median income of $25,556 versus $16,375 for females. The per capita income for the city was $15,287. About 8.5% of families and 9.2% of the population were below the poverty line, including 1.5% of those under age 18 and 23.6% of those age 65 or over.
