= East Mercer, North Dakota =

- Unorganized territory
- Location within North Dakota
- Coordinates: 47°23′16″N 101°33′26″W
- Country: United States
- State: North Dakota
- County: Mercer

Area
  - Total: 379.6 sq mi (983 km^{2})
  - Land: 344.6 sq mi (893 km^{2})
  - Water: 35.0 sq mi (91 km^{2})
- Elevation: 1,988 ft (606 m)

Population (2020)
  - Total: 1,233
  - Density: 3.578/sq mi (1.381/km^{2})
- Time zone: UTC-6 (Central (CST))
  - Summer (DST): UTC-5 (CDT)
- Area code: 701
- FIPS code: 38-21710
- GNIS feature ID: 2397799

East Mercer is an unorganized territory in Mercer County, North Dakota, United States. The population was 1,233 at the 2020 census.
