= Westover, South Dakota =

Unincorporated community in Jones County, South Dakota, US

Coordinates: 43°44′52″N 100°39′58″W

Westover is an unincorporated community in Jones County, in the U.S. state of South Dakota.

== History ==
A post office called Westover was in operation between 1891 and 1957. According to the Federal Writers' Project, the origin of the name Westover is obscure.
