= Kennebec, South Dakota =

- Town
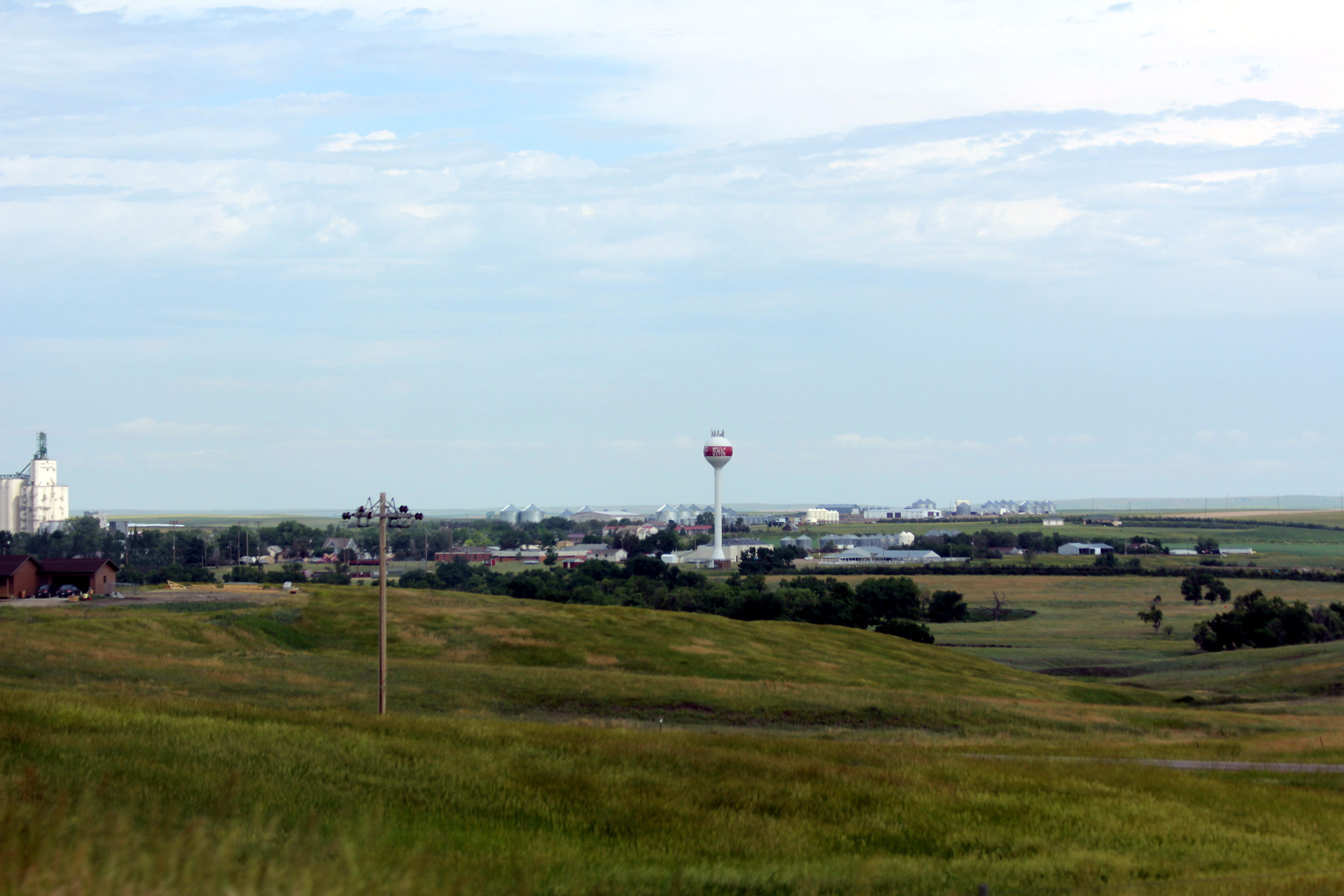
- Panorama of Kennebec

- Location in Lyman County and the state of South Dakota
- Coordinates: 43°54′13″N 99°51′43″W
- Country: United States
- State: South Dakota
- County: Lyman
- Incorporated: 1909

Area
  - Total: 0.85 sq mi (2.21 km^{2})
  - Land: 0.85 sq mi (2.21 km^{2})
  - Water: 0 sq mi (0.00 km^{2})
- Elevation: 1,690 ft (520 m)

Population (2020)
  - Total: 281
  - Density: 329.4/sq mi (127.18/km^{2})
- Time zone: UTC-6 (Central (CST))
  - Summer (DST): UTC-5 (CDT)
- ZIP code: 57544
- Area code: 605
- FIPS code: 46-33580
- GNIS feature ID: 1267443
- Website: www.kennebecsd.us

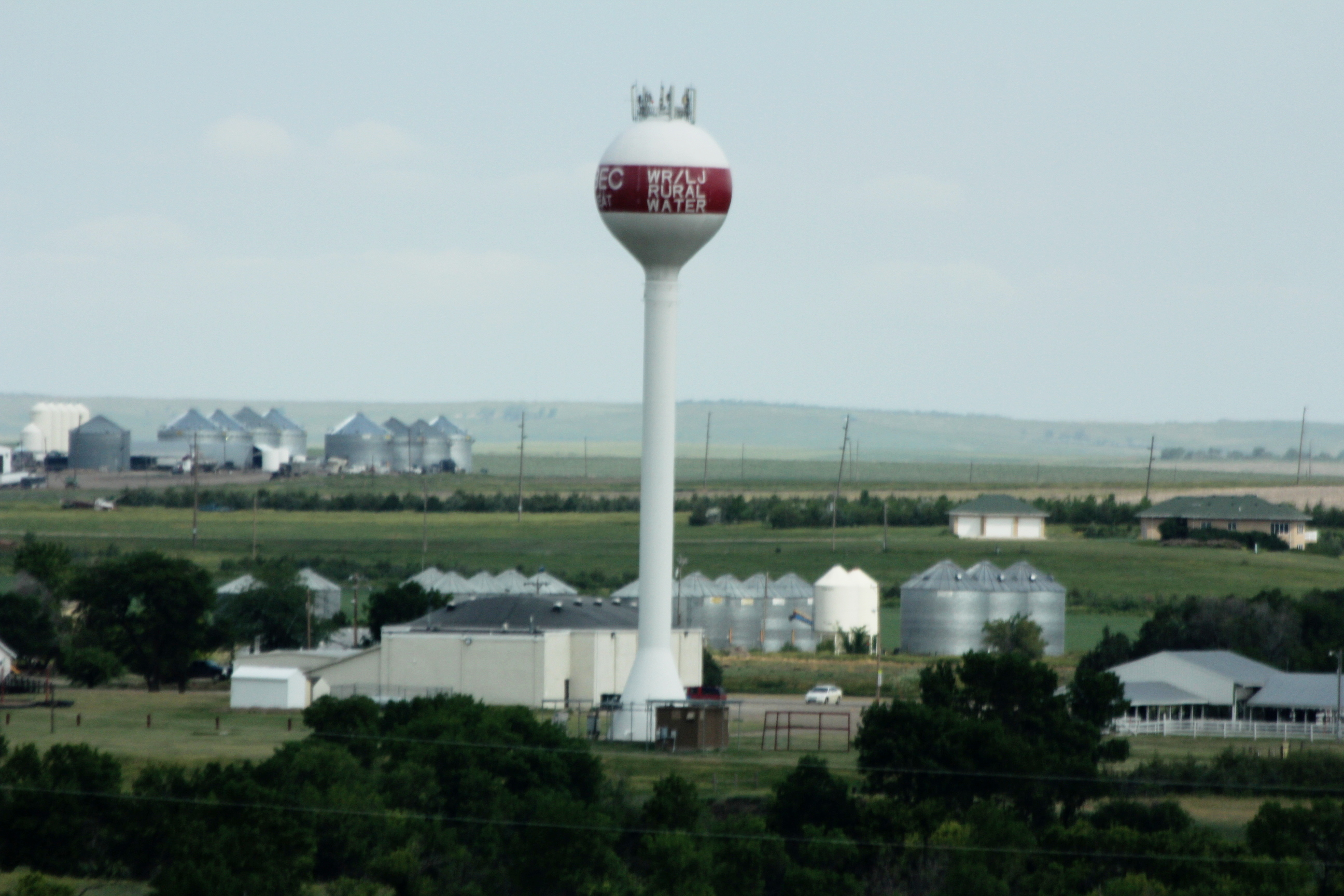
Water tower

Kennebec is a town in and the county seat of Lyman County, South Dakota, United States. The population was 281 at the 2020 census.

== History ==
Kennebec was laid out in 1905. Kennebec has served as county seat of Lyman County since 1922. The courthouse dates from 1925.

== Transportation ==
The highways that run in or near Kennebec are east–west Interstate 90 (I‑90) and South Dakota Highway 273 (SD 273), which is a north–south highway.

The one main transportation for Kennebec is by road (I‑90 and SD 273), as there is no airport, municipal or commercial. There are no trains for passengers but the Ringneck & Western Railroad provides freight service to the Wheat Growers' Kennebec Elevator.

== Geography ==
According to the United States Census Bureau, the town has a total area of 0.85 square miles (2.20 km^{2}), all land.

Kennebec is located about 25 miles (40 km) west-northwest of Chamberlain, 42 miles (68 km) east of Murdo, 89 miles (143 km) west of Mitchell, and 180 miles (290 km) east of Rapid City. Kennebec is located in a section of agricultural use area in Kennebec Township. Medicine Creek is about one eighth of a mile south of Kennebec.

=== Climate ===
Climate data for Kennebec, South Dakota (1991−2020 normals, extremes 1893−present)
Month	Jan	Feb	Mar	Apr	May	Jun	Jul	Aug	Sep	Oct	Nov	Dec	Year
Record high °F (°C)	70 (21)	76 (24)	91 (33)	99 (37)	108 (42)	112 (44)	119 (48)	114 (46)	110 (43)	101 (38)	89 (32)	74 (23)	119 (48)
Mean daily maximum °F (°C)	31.6 (−0.2)	36.4 (2.4)	49.0 (9.4)	61.6 (16.4)	72.4 (22.4)	82.4 (28.0)	89.7 (32.1)	87.8 (31.0)	80.3 (26.8)	63.8 (17.7)	47.1 (8.4)	34.3 (1.3)	61.4 (16.3)
Daily mean °F (°C)	20.4 (−6.4)	24.6 (−4.1)	35.9 (2.2)	47.3 (8.5)	58.6 (14.8)	69.0 (20.6)	75.6 (24.2)	73.5 (23.1)	64.9 (18.3)	49.7 (9.8)	34.7 (1.5)	23.4 (−4.8)	48.1 (8.9)
Mean daily minimum °F (°C)	9.2 (−12.7)	12.7 (−10.7)	22.7 (−5.2)	32.9 (0.5)	44.9 (7.2)	55.6 (13.1)	61.4 (16.3)	59.2 (15.1)	49.5 (9.7)	35.6 (2.0)	22.3 (−5.4)	12.5 (−10.8)	34.9 (1.6)
Record low °F (°C)	−42 (−41)	−45 (−43)	−28 (−33)	−7 (−22)	11 (−12)	28 (−2)	35 (2)	32 (0)	11 (−12)	−19 (−28)	−23 (−31)	−35 (−37)	−45 (−43)
Average precipitation inches (mm)	0.45 (11)	0.59 (15)	0.96 (24)	2.34 (59)	3.29 (84)	3.48 (88)	2.84 (72)	2.31 (59)	1.72 (44)	1.63 (41)	0.71 (18)	0.47 (12)	20.79 (528)
Average snowfall inches (cm)	5.5 (14)	7.6 (19)	5.5 (14)	6.2 (16)	0.0 (0.0)	0.0 (0.0)	0.0 (0.0)	0.0 (0.0)	0.0 (0.0)	1.6 (4.1)	6.0 (15)	7.2 (18)	39.6 (101)
Average precipitation days (≥ 0.01 in)	4.3	4.9	5.0	8.7	9.8	10.0	8.0	7.2	6.3	6.6	4.5	4.5	79.8
Average snowy days (≥ 0.1 in)	3.1	4.0	2.6	1.6	0.0	0.0	0.0	0.0	0.0	0.6	2.4	3.7	18.0
Source: NOAA

== Demographics ==
Historical population
Census	Pop.	Note	%±
1910	252		—
1920	341		35.3%
1930	349		2.3%
1940	390		11.7%
1950	374		−4.1%
1960	372		−0.5%
1970	372		0.0%
1980	334		−10.2%
1990	284		−15.0%
2000	286		0.7%
2010	240		−16.1%
2020	281		17.1%
U.S. Decennial Census

=== 2010 census ===
As of the census of 2010, there were 240 people, 112 households, and 69 families residing in the town. The population density was 282.4 inhabitants per square mile (109.0/km^{2}). There were 146 housing units at an average density of 171.8 per square mile (66.3/km^{2}). The racial makeup of the town was 90.0% White, 6.7% Native American, and 3.3% from two or more races.

There were 112 households, of which 23.2% had children under the age of 18 living with them, 50.9% were married couples living together, 7.1% had a female householder with no husband present, 3.6% had a male householder with no wife present, and 38.4% were non-families. 33.9% of all households were made up of individuals, and 17.9% had someone living alone who was 65 years of age or older. The average household size was 2.14 and the average family size was 2.72.

The median age in the town was 45.6 years. 22.5% of residents were under the age of 18; 5% were between the ages of 18 and 24; 20.8% were from 25 to 44; 25.4% were from 45 to 64; and 26.3% were 65 years of age or older. The gender makeup of the town was 51.7% male and 48.3% female.

=== 2000 census ===
As of the census of 2000, there were 286 people, 120 households, and 80 families residing in the town. The population density was 336.9 inhabitants per square mile (130.1/km^{2}). There were 152 housing units at an average density of 179.1 per square mile (69.2/km^{2}). The racial makeup of the town was 88.46% White, 6.64% Native American, 1.05% Asian, and 3.85% from two or more races. Hispanic or Latino of any race were 0.70% of the population.

There were 120 households, out of which 24.2% had children under the age of 18 living with them, 55.8% were married couples living together, 4.2% had a female householder with no husband present, and 33.3% were non-families. 30.0% of all households were made up of individuals, and 18.3% had someone living alone who was 65 years of age or older. The average household size was 2.38 and the average family size was 3.01.

In the town, the population was spread out, with 24.8% under the age of 18, 4.2% from 18 to 24, 25.2% from 25 to 44, 25.5% from 45 to 64, and 20.3% who were 65 years of age or older. The median age was 44 years. For every 100 females, there were 110.3 males. For every 100 females age 18 and over, there were 104.8 males.

The median income for a household in the town was $36,875, and the median income for a family was $50,000. Males had a median income of $26,161 versus $17,813 for females. The per capita income for the town was $20,815. About 3.9% of families and 8.1% of the population were below the poverty line, including 6.1% of those under the age of eighteen and 5.2% of those 65 or over.

== Notable people ==
- James Abdnor, South Dakota politician who was United States Senator from 1981 to 1987
- James Schaefer, South Dakota state legislator and rancher
- Merrill Q. Sharpe, Governor of South Dakota

== See also ==
- List of towns in South Dakota
