= Cannon Ball, North Dakota =

Cannon Ball, North Dakota Íŋyaŋwakaǧapi
- CDP
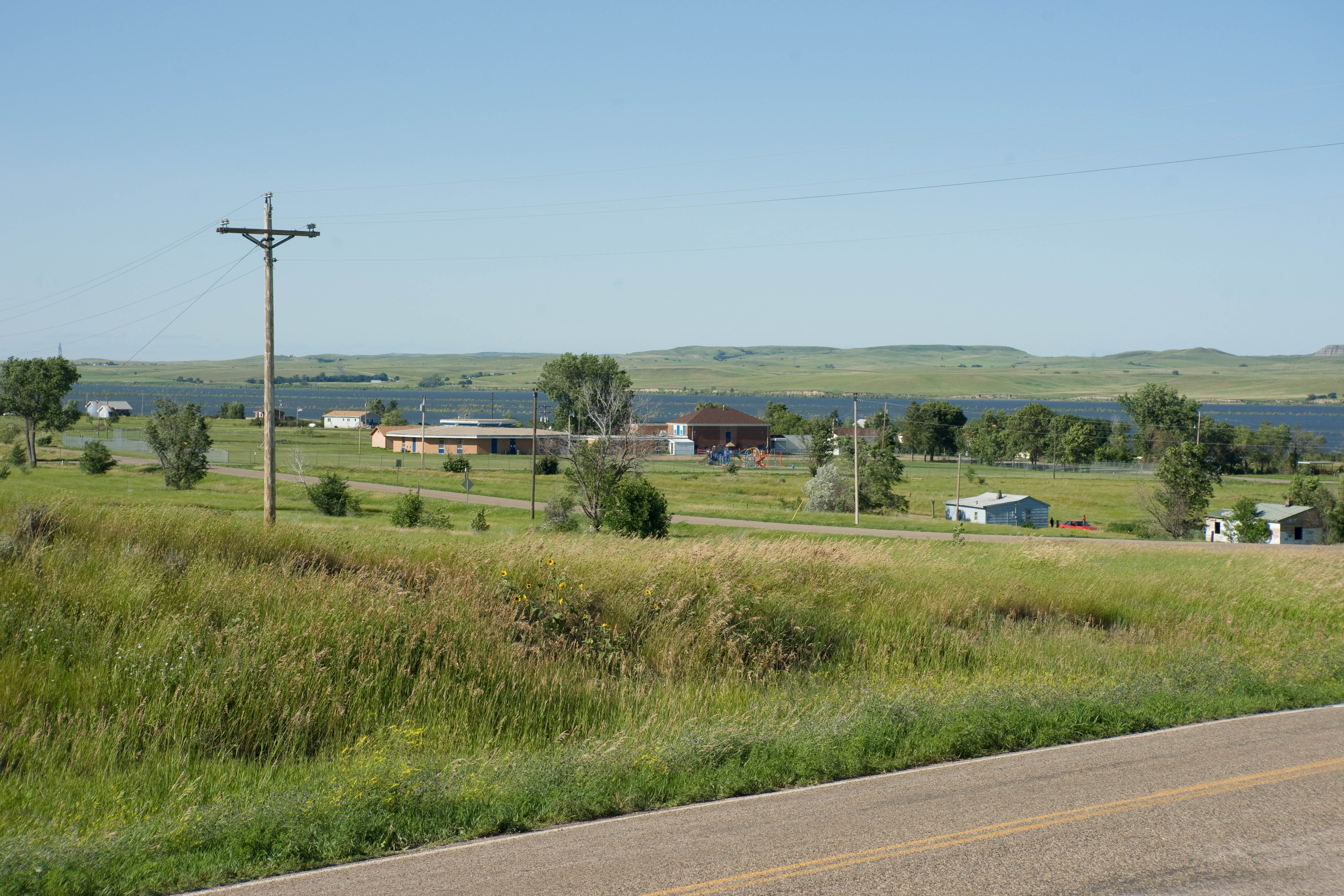
- The Cannonball River
- Interactive map of Cannon Ball, North Dakota
- Location within North Dakota
- Coordinates: 46.3237°N 100.6294°W
- Country: United States
- Indian Reservation: Standing Rock Sioux Reservation
- State: North Dakota
- County: Sioux
- Founded: June 21, 1880

Area
  - Total: 96.669 sq mi (250.372 km^{2})
  - Land: 88.266 sq mi (228.609 km^{2})
  - Water: 8.404 sq mi (21.765 km^{2}) 8.69%
- Elevation: 1,749 ft (533 m)

Population (2020)
  - Total: 864
  - Estimate (2025): 857
  - Density: 9.79/sq mi (3.78/km^{2})
- Time zone: UTC–6 (Central (CST))
  - Summer (DST): UTC–5 (CDT)
- ZIP Code: 58528
- Area code: 701
- FIPS code: 38-12020
- GNIS feature ID: 2393365
- Highway: ND 24

Cannon Ball (Lakota: Íŋyaŋwakaǧapi) is a census-designated place (CDP) on the Standing Rock Sioux Reservation and in Sioux County, North Dakota, United States. It is located in the northeastern part of Sioux County, having developed at the confluence of the Cannonball River and Lake Oahe of the Missouri River. The population was 864 as of the 2020 census, and was estimated at 857 in 2025.

== History ==
Cannon Ball was founded on June 21, 1880.

== Geography ==
According to the United States Census Bureau, the CDP has an area of 96.669 square miles (250.37 km^{2}), of which 88.266 square miles (228.61 km^{2}) is land and 8.403 square miles (21.76 km^{2}) (8.69%) is water.

== Demographics ==
Historical population
Census	Pop.	Note	%±
1990	702		—
2000	864		23.1%
2010	875		1.3%
2020	864		−1.3%
2025 (est.)	857		−0.8%
U.S. Decennial Census; 2020 Census

As of the 2024 American Community Survey, there were 207 estimated households in Cannon Ball with an average of 3.61 persons per household. The CDP has a median household income of $42,031. Approximately 50.7% of the CDP's population lives at or below the poverty line. Cannon Ball has an estimated 39.1% employment rate, with 3.8% of the population holding a bachelor's degree or higher and 86.6% holding a high school diploma. There were 220 housing units at an average density of 2.49 per square mile (1.0/km^{2}).

The top five reported languages (people were allowed to report up to two languages, thus the figures will generally add to more than 100%) were English (94.2%), Spanish (0.0%), Indo-European (0.3%), Asian and Pacific Islander (0.0%), and Other (5.4%).

The median age in the CDP was 29.2 years.

Cannon Ball, North Dakota – racial and ethnic composition Note: the US Census treats Hispanic/Latino as an ethnic category. This table excludes Latinos from the racial categories and assigns them to a separate category. Hispanics/Latinos may be of any race.
Race / ethnicity (NH = non-Hispanic)	Pop. 2000	Pop. 2010	Pop. 2020	% 2000	% 2010	% 2020
White alone (NH)	46	40	33	5.32%	4.57%	3.82%
Black or African American alone (NH)	0	1	1	0.00%	0.11%	0.12%
Native American or Alaska Native alone (NH)	798	803	778	92.36%	91.77%	90.05%
Asian alone (NH)	0	0	0	0.00%	0.00%	0.00%
Pacific Islander alone (NH)	1	0	0	0.12%	0.00%	0.00%
Other race alone (NH)	0	0	0	0.00%	0.00%	0.00%
Mixed race or multiracial (NH)	1	19	36	0.12%	2.17%	4.17%
Hispanic or Latino (any race)	18	12	16	2.08%	1.37%	1.85%
Total	864	875	864	100.00%	100.00%	100.00%

=== 2020 census ===
As of the 2020 census, there were 864 people, 209 households, and 155 families residing in the CDP. The population density was 9.79 inhabitants per square mile (3.8/km^{2}). There were 226 housing units at an average density of 2.56 per square mile (1.0/km^{2}). The racial makeup of the CDP was 3.82% White, 0.12% African American, 91.55% Native American, 0.00% Asian, 0.00% Pacific Islander, 0.12% from some other races and 4.40% from two or more races. Hispanic or Latino people of any race were 1.85% of the population.

=== 2010 census ===
As of the 2010 census, there were 875 people, 205 households, and 178 families residing in the CDP. The population density was 9.91 inhabitants per square mile (3.8/km^{2}). There were 227 housing units at an average density of 2.57 per square mile (1.0/km^{2}). The racial makeup of the CDP was 4.80% White, 0.11% African American, 92.91% Native American, 0.00% Asian, 0.00% Pacific Islander, 0.00% from some other races and 2.17% from two or more races. Hispanic or Latino people of any race were 1.37% of the population.

=== 2000 census ===
As of the 2000 census, there were 864 people, 197 households, and 171 families residing in the CDP. The population density was 9.77 inhabitants per square mile (3.8/km^{2}). There were 208 housing units at an average density of 2.35 per square mile (0.9/km^{2}). The racial makeup of the CDP was 5.32% White, 0.00% African American, 94.21% Native American, 0.00% Asian, 0.12% Pacific Islander, 0.23% from some other races and 0.12% from two or more races. Hispanic or Latino people of any race were 2.08% of the population.

There were 197 households, of which 56.9% had children under the age of 18 living with them, 38.6% were married couples living together, 35.0% had a female householder with no husband present, and 12.7% were non-families. 11.2% of all households were made up of individuals, and 2.0% had someone living alone who was 65 years of age or older. The average household size was 4.35 and the average family size was 4.56.

46.4% of the population were under the age of 18, 11.2% from 18 to 24, 23.5% from 25 to 44, 15.3% from 45 to 64 and 3.6% were 65 years of age or older. The median age was 20 years. For every 100 females, there were 92.4 males. For every 100 females age 18 and over, there were 86.7 males.

The median household income was $19,265 and the median family income was $18,583. Males had a median income of $21,875 and females $17,250. The per capita income was $5,717. About 49.7% of families and 50.9% of the population were below the poverty line, including 58.3% of those under age 18 and 8.6% of those age 65 or over.

== Education ==
The Solen Public School District 3 was organized in 1963.

- Solen High School (6-12) in Solen
- Solen Elementary School (PK-5) in Solen

The area is served by the Solen Public School District 3. It operates the Solen School. In the 2025-26 academic year, the district reported a total of 191 students. While a portion is in the Fort Yates Public School District 4. Fort Yates is combined with the Standing Rock Community Grant School.
