= Mission Ridge, South Dakota =

Mission Ridge
- Unincorporated community
- Location within the state of South Dakota Mission Ridge (the United States)
- Coordinates: 44°41′31″N 100°47′45″W
- Country: United States
- State: South Dakota
- County: Stanley
- Elevation: 1,985 ft (605 m)
- Time zone: UTC-6 (Central (CST))
  - Summer (DST): UTC-5 (CDT)
- ZIP codes: 57557
- GNIS feature ID: 1266866

Mission Ridge is an unincorporated community in northern Stanley County, South Dakota, United States. It lies along Highway 1806 north of the city of Fort Pierre, the county seat of Stanley County. Mission Ridge has a post office with the ZIP code of 57557.

Casey Duane Tibbs, b. March 5, 1929 - d. January 28, 1990 was born here. All Around Cowboy 1951, 1955, Saddle Bronc Champ 1949, 1951-1954, 1959, Bareback Champ 1951.

The community was named for the elevated town site near Mission Creek.
