= Breien, North Dakota =

Unincorporated community in North Dakota, US

- Location within North Dakota Location within the United States
- Coordinates: 46°22′48″N 100°56′32″W
- Country: United States
- State: North Dakota
- County: Morton County

Population
  - Total: 10

Breien is an unincorporated community in Morton County, in the U.S. state of North Dakota.

== History ==
A post office called Breien was established in 1916, and remained in operation until 1985. In the 1930s, Breien had a population of 53 inhabitants. In 2009 the former post office building was torn down. In 2015, the grain elevator was razed, likely due to health concerns, although the reason is unconfirmed. As of 2018, the populated is estimated to be near 10.
