= Kenel, South Dakota =

Unincorporated community in South Dakota, U.S.

Coordinates: 45°51′30″N 100°27′35″W

Kenel is an unincorporated community in Corson County, in the U.S. state of South Dakota. As of the 2020 census, Kenel had a population of 130.

== History ==
A post office called Kenel was established in 1914, and remained in operation until 1963. The community has the name of Father Martin Kenel, a local priest. The main regulation reservoir of the Standing Rock Rural Water System, the $3.6 million Kline Butte Storage Reservoir, is located southwest of Kenel.
