= Solen, North Dakota =

- City
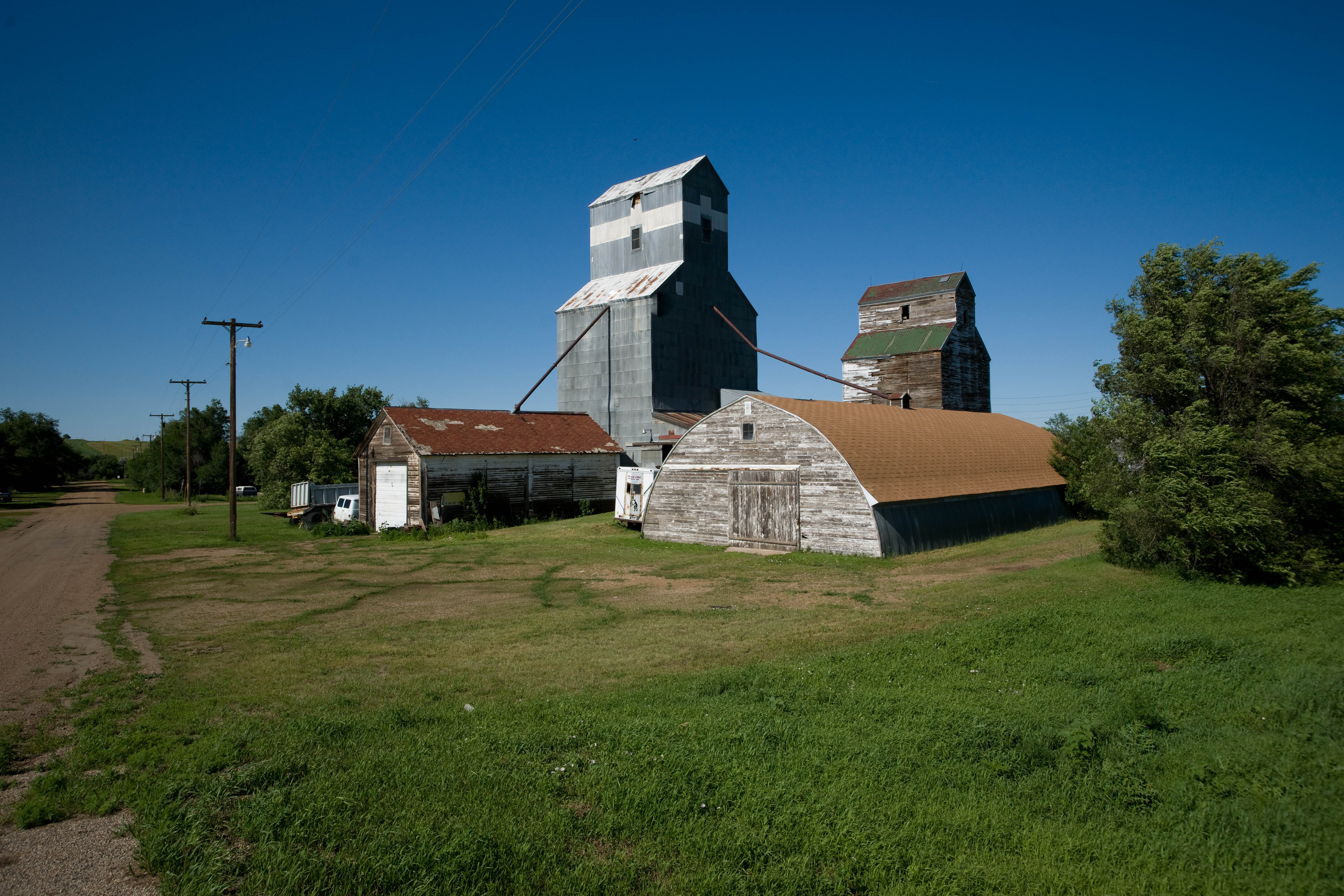

- Location of Solen, North Dakota
- Coordinates: 46°23′14″N 100°47′44″W
- Country: United States
- State: North Dakota
- County: Sioux
- Founded: 1910

Area
  - Total: 0.34 sq mi (0.87 km^{2})
  - Land: 0.34 sq mi (0.87 km^{2})
  - Water: 0 sq mi (0.00 km^{2})
- Elevation: 1,680 ft (512 m)

Population (2020)
  - Total: 70
  - Estimate (2024): 67
  - Density: 209.5/sq mi (80.87/km^{2})
- Time zone: UTC–6 (Central (CST))
  - Summer (DST): UTC–5 (CDT)
- ZIP Code: 58570
- Area code: 701
- FIPS code: 38-73820
- GNIS feature ID: 1036264

Solen is a city in Sioux County, North Dakota, United States and on the Standing Rock Sioux Reservation. The population was 70 at the 2020 census.

The town has a gas station and automotive repair shop called Hoffman's Garage which has been family owned and operated since the early 1900s.

== History ==
Solen was founded in 1910 along a Northern Pacific Railway branch line that ran from Mandan to Mott. The name comes from Mary Louise Van Solen, the half-Lakota and half-French daughter of Eagle Woman (Matilda Galpin) and one of the first schoolteachers on the Standing Rock Sioux Reservation.

== Geography ==
Solen is located along the Cannonball River, west of the Missouri.

According to the United States Census Bureau, the city has a total area of 0.30 square miles (0.78 km^{2}), all land.

== Demographics ==
Historical population
Census	Pop.	Note	%±
1970	180		—
1980	138		−23.3%
1990	92		−33.3%
2000	86		−6.5%
2010	83		−3.5%
2020	70		−15.7%
2024 (est.)	67		−4.3%
U.S. Decennial Census; 2020 Census

=== 2010 census ===
As of the 2010 census, there were 83 people, 33 households, and 21 families residing in the city. The population density was 276.7 inhabitants per square mile (106.8/km^{2}). There were 44 housing units at an average density of 146.7 per square mile (56.6/km^{2}). The racial makeup of the city was 36.1% White, 51.8% Native American, and 12.0% from two or more races.

There were 33 households, of which 21.2% had children under the age of 18 living with them, 36.4% were married couples living together, 24.2% had a female householder with no husband present, 3.0% had a male householder with no wife present, and 36.4% were non-families. 30.3% of all households were made up of individuals, and 9.1% had someone living alone who was 65 years of age or older. The average household size was 2.52 and the average family size was 3.00.

The median age in the city was 44.3 years. 18.1% of residents were under the age of 18; 8.3% were between the ages of 18 and 24; 25.2% were from 25 to 44; 33.7% were from 45 to 64; and 14.5% were 65 years of age or older. The gender makeup of the city was 51.8% male and 48.2% female.

=== 2000 census ===
As of the 2000 census, there were 86 people, 36 households, and 23 families residing in the city. The population density was 287.0 inhabitants per square mile (110.8/km^{2}). There were 43 housing units at an average density of 143.5 per square mile (55.4/km^{2}). The racial makeup of the city was 34.88% White and 65.12% Native American. Hispanic or Latino of any race were 3.49% of the population.

There were 36 households, out of which 30.6% had children under the age of 18 living with them, 36.1% were married couples living together, 22.2% had a female householder with no husband present, and 36.1% were non-families. 27.8% of all households were made up of individuals, and 2.8% had someone living alone who was 65 years of age or older. The average household size was 2.39 and the average family size was 2.65.

In the city, the population was spread out, with 25.6% under the age of 18, 5.8% from 18 to 24, 26.7% from 25 to 44, 31.4% from 45 to 64, and 10.5% who were 65 years of age or older. The median age was 36 years. For every 100 females, there were 87.0 males. For every 100 females age 18 and over, there were 100.0 males.

The median income for a household in the city was $21,042, and the median income for a family was $21,250. Males had a median income of $33,750 versus $16,250 for females. The per capita income for the city was $9,649. There were 41.7% of families and 40.0% of the population living below the poverty line, including 66.7% of under eighteens and 50.0% of those over 64.

== Climate ==
This climatic region is typified by large seasonal temperature differences, with warm to hot (and often humid) summers and cold (sometimes severely cold) winters. According to the Köppen Climate Classification system, Solen has a humid continental climate, abbreviated "Dfb" on climate maps.

== Education ==
It is in the Solen School District.

Solen has one high school, Solen Public High School, nicknamed the "Solen Sioux".
