= Forest City, South Dakota =

Unincorporated community in Potter County, South Dakota, U.S.

Coordinates: 45°00′10″N 100°18′01″W

Forest City is an unincorporated community in Potter County, in the U.S. state of South Dakota.

== History ==
A post office called Forest City was established in 1884 and remained in operation until 1943. The community was so named for a nearby tract of forest.
