= Hoven, South Dakota =

- Town
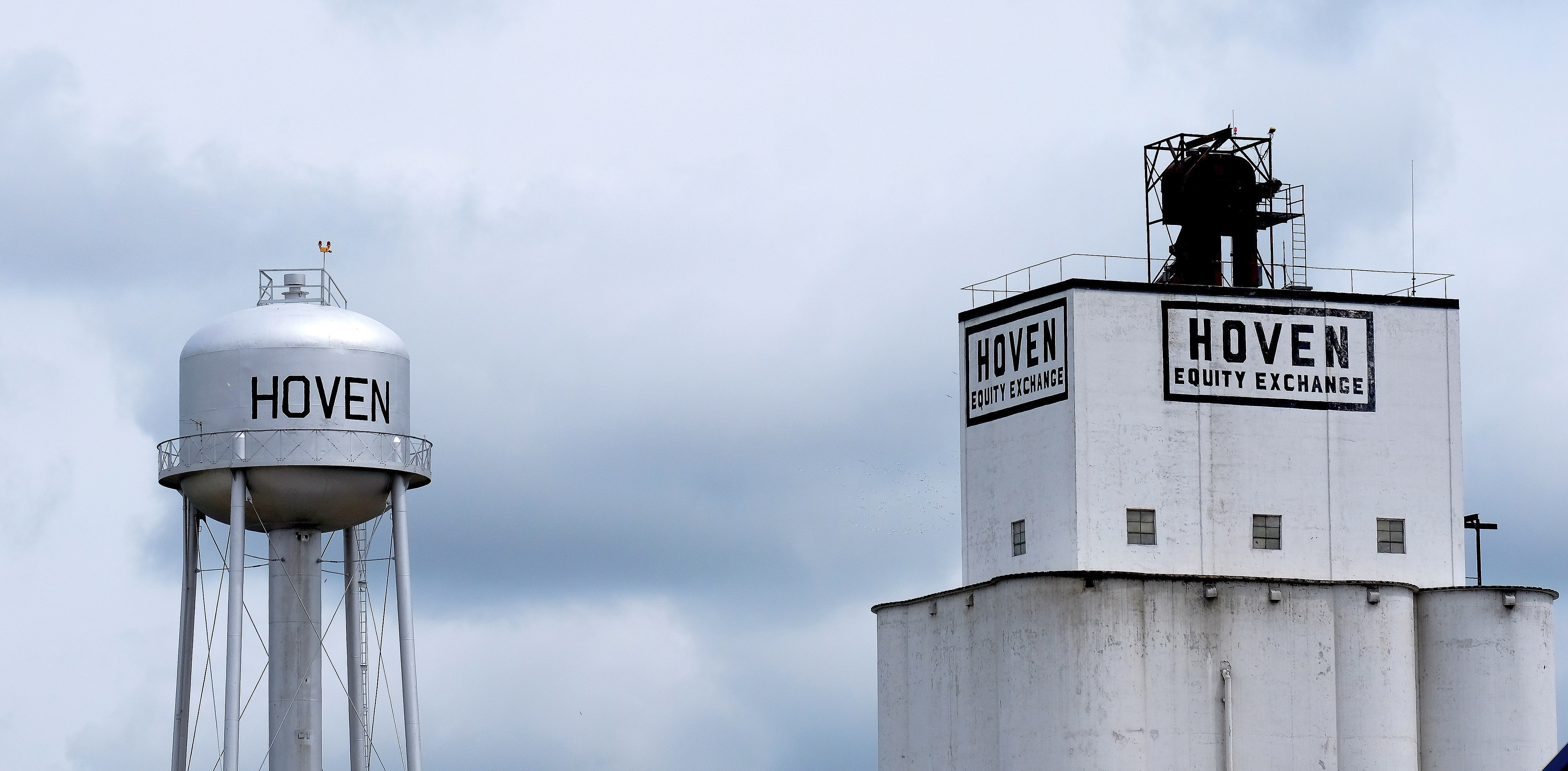
- Water tower and Equity Exchange

- Location within South Dakota Location within the United States
- Coordinates: 45°14′30″N 99°46′39″W
- Country: United States
- State: South Dakota
- County: Potter
- Incorporated: 1927

Area
  - Total: 0.31 sq mi (0.79 km^{2})
  - Land: 0.31 sq mi (0.79 km^{2})
  - Water: 0 sq mi (0.00 km^{2})
- Elevation: 1,906 ft (581 m)

Population (2020)
  - Total: 379
  - Density: 1,236.7/sq mi (477.49/km^{2})
- Time zone: UTC-6 (Central (CST))
  - Summer (DST): UTC-5 (CDT)
- ZIP code: 57450
- Area code: 605
- FIPS code: 46-30300
- GNIS feature ID: 1267428

Hoven is a town in Potter County, South Dakota, United States. The population was 379 at the 2020 census.

Hoven was laid out in 1883 and named after either Matt or Peter Hoven, who were the first settlers.

== Geography ==
According to the United States Census Bureau, the town has a total area of 0.31 square miles (0.80 km^{2}), all land.

== Education ==
According to , Hoven High School is a school available local to the Hoven town region. The school supports preschool to year 12. The school is located at 98 5th Ave West, P.O. Box 128 Hoven, SD 57450.

== Demographics ==
Historical population
Census	Pop.	Note	%±
1910	209		—
1920	271		29.7%
1930	386		42.4%
1940	369		−4.4%
1950	552		49.6%
1960	568		2.9%
1970	671		18.1%
1980	615		−8.3%
1990	522		−15.1%
2000	511		−2.1%
2010	406		−20.5%
2020	379		−6.7%
U.S. Decennial Census

=== 2010 census ===
As of the census of 2010, there were 406 people, 187 households, and 111 families residing in the town. The population density was 1,309.7 inhabitants per square mile (505.7/km^{2}). There were 221 housing units at an average density of 712.9 per square mile (275.3/km^{2}). The racial makeup of the town was 98.0% White, 0.7% Asian, 0.2% Pacific Islander, and 1.0% from two or more races. Hispanic or Latino of any race were 0.7% of the population.

There were 187 households, of which 23.5% had children under the age of 18 living with them, 52.9% were married couples living together, 3.7% had a female householder with no husband present, 2.7% had a male householder with no wife present, and 40.6% were non-families. 39.0% of all households were made up of individuals, and 24.6% had someone living alone who was 65 years of age or older. The average household size was 2.10 and the average family size was 2.78.

The median age in the town was 50.7 years. 21.9% of residents were under the age of 18; 2.6% were between the ages of 18 and 24; 16.7% were from 25 to 44; 26.7% were from 45 to 64; and 32.3% were 65 years of age or older. The gender makeup of the town was 45.6% male and 54.4% female.

=== 2000 census ===
As of the census of 2000, there were 511 people, 213 households, and 145 families residing in the town. The population density was 1,683.4 inhabitants per square mile (650.0/km^{2}). There were 245 housing units at an average density of 807.1 per square mile (311.6/km^{2}). The racial makeup of the town was 98.83% White, 0.20% Asian, 0.39% from other races, and 0.59% from two or more races. Hispanic or Latino of any race were 0.39% of the population.

There were 213 households, out of which 27.2% had children under the age of 18 living with them, 62.9% were married couples living together, 4.7% had a female householder with no husband present, and 31.9% were non-families. 30.5% of all households were made up of individuals, and 18.8% had someone living alone who was 65 years of age or older. The average household size was 2.34 and the average family size was 2.94.

In the town, the population was spread out, with 22.7% under the age of 18, 3.7% from 18 to 24, 25.0% from 25 to 44, 21.5% from 45 to 64, and 27.0% who were 65 years of age or older. The median age was 44 years. For every 100 females, there were 92.8 males. For every 100 females age 18 and over, there were 90.8 males.

The median income for a household in the town was $28,942, and the median income for a family was $38,750. Males had a median income of $25,250 versus $14,063 for females. The per capita income for the town was $16,809. About 8.8% of families and 15.5% of the population were below the poverty line, including 25.6% of those under age 18 and 21.1% of those age 65 or over.
