= Gettysburg, South Dakota =

- City
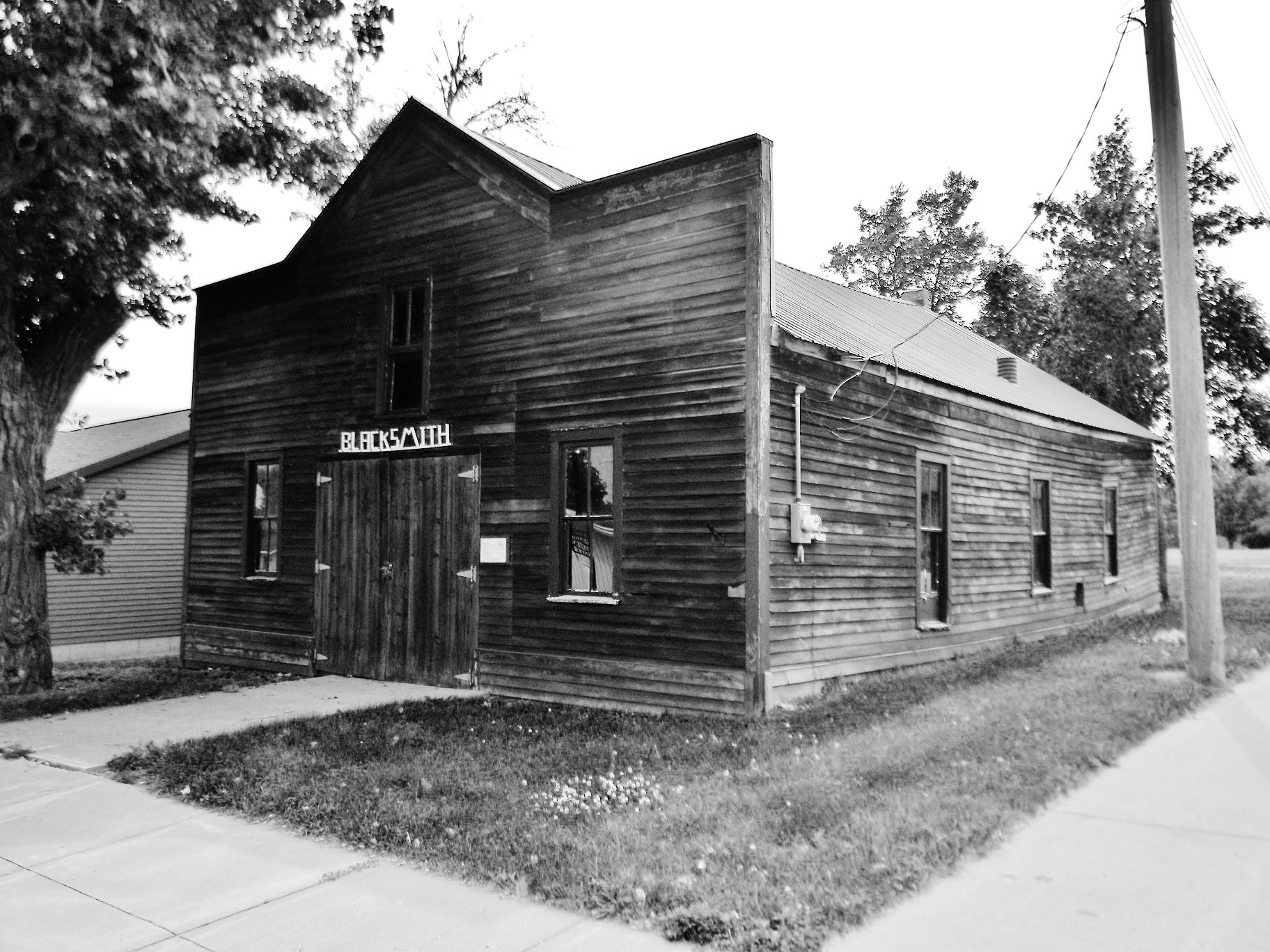
- Stocker Blacksmith Shop, listed on the National Register of Historic Places
- Nickname: Gettysburg "Where the Battle Wasn't"
- Motto: "Come Play On The Prairie"
- Location in Potter County and the state of South Dakota
- Coordinates: 45°00′22″N 99°57′14″W
- Country: United States
- State: South Dakota
- County: Potter
- Incorporated: 1907

Government
  - Mayor: Adam Roseland

Area
  - Total: 1.92 sq mi (4.97 km^{2})
  - Land: 1.92 sq mi (4.97 km^{2})
  - Water: 0 sq mi (0.00 km^{2})
- Elevation: 2,064 ft (629 m)

Population (2020)
  - Total: 1,104
  - Density: 574.8/sq mi (221.92/km^{2})
- Time zone: UTC−6 (Central (CST))
  - Summer (DST): UTC−5 (CDT)
- ZIP code: 57442
- Area code: 605
- FIPS code: 46-24260
- GNIS feature ID: 1267404
- Website: cityofgettysburg.com

Gettysburg is a city in and the county seat of Potter County, South Dakota, United States, along the 45th parallel. The population was 1,104 at the 2020 census.

== History ==
Gettysburg was platted in 1884. The city was named in commemoration of the Battle of Gettysburg. A large share of the early settlers were Civil War veterans of the Union Army. Gettysburg was once home to Gettysburg Air Force Station which closed in 1968.

== Geography ==
According to the United States Census Bureau, the city has a total area of 1.89 square miles (4.90 km^{2}), all land.

=== Climate ===
With a precipitation slightly above 465 mm, the city can be considered the watershed between the dry climates of the American West to the humid climates of the American East, although closer to the former, with a center characterized by the steppes and medium precipitation marking the east limit of the group B of dry climates (except for the hot versions on the subcontinent) for the 99.9 °W meridian. From the climatic map of the University of Melbourne, Gettysburg is the easternmost city in North America with a semi-arid cold climate (Köppen: Bsk). The average high temperature is 12.7 °C and the low average is -0.4 °C, which makes temperatures below the freezing point predominate for at least part of the year. The annual average snow is of 99 cm. For the official data of the NOAA/Weather Service: the average annual precipitation is of 501 mm, by which it strengthens its role of confluence. The wettest months range from May to July ranging from 72 to 88 mm and the driest January (only 9 mm). The amount of snow is average in proportion to its cold weather surpassing the 20 cm between February and March.

Climate data for Gettysburg, South Dakota (1991−2020 normals, extremes 1901−present)
Month	Jan	Feb	Mar	Apr	May	Jun	Jul	Aug	Sep	Oct	Nov	Dec	Year
Record high °F (°C)	64 (18)	70 (21)	85 (29)	97 (36)	104 (40)	108 (42)	114 (46)	111 (44)	107 (42)	94 (34)	80 (27)	69 (21)	114 (46)
Mean daily maximum °F (°C)	24.8 (−4.0)	29.1 (−1.6)	41.5 (5.3)	55.8 (13.2)	67.5 (19.7)	77.7 (25.4)	84.3 (29.1)	83.0 (28.3)	73.8 (23.2)	58.0 (14.4)	41.8 (5.4)	28.9 (−1.7)	55.5 (13.1)
Daily mean °F (°C)	15.1 (−9.4)	19.2 (−7.1)	30.9 (−0.6)	43.9 (6.6)	55.7 (13.2)	66.2 (19.0)	72.0 (22.2)	70.4 (21.3)	61.0 (16.1)	46.3 (7.9)	31.6 (−0.2)	19.5 (−6.9)	44.3 (6.8)
Mean daily minimum °F (°C)	5.3 (−14.8)	9.3 (−12.6)	20.3 (−6.5)	32.0 (0.0)	43.8 (6.6)	54.6 (12.6)	59.8 (15.4)	57.8 (14.3)	48.2 (9.0)	34.7 (1.5)	21.3 (−5.9)	10.1 (−12.2)	33.1 (0.6)
Record low °F (°C)	−33 (−36)	−34 (−37)	−28 (−33)	0 (−18)	16 (−9)	32 (0)	38 (3)	34 (1)	19 (−7)	1 (−17)	−17 (−27)	−32 (−36)	−34 (−37)
Average precipitation inches (mm)	0.29 (7.4)	0.57 (14)	0.66 (17)	1.86 (47)	3.03 (77)	3.45 (88)	3.01 (76)	2.49 (63)	2.01 (51)	1.89 (48)	0.51 (13)	0.40 (10)	20.17 (512)
Average snowfall inches (cm)	6.8 (17)	10.6 (27)	5.5 (14)	4.5 (11)	0.3 (0.76)	0.0 (0.0)	0.0 (0.0)	0.0 (0.0)	0.0 (0.0)	1.3 (3.3)	3.0 (7.6)	6.7 (17)	38.7 (98)
Average precipitation days (≥ 0.01 in)	4.0	5.3	5.2	7.9	9.4	9.6	7.9	7.4	7.0	6.7	4.1	4.2	78.7
Average snowy days (≥ 0.1 in)	3.9	4.5	2.1	1.3	0.1	0.0	0.0	0.0	0.0	0.5	1.5	3.5	17.4
Source: NOAA

== Demographics ==
Historical population
Census	Pop.	Note	%±
1910	936		—
1920	951		1.6%
1930	1,400		47.2%
1940	1,324		−5.4%
1950	1,555		17.4%
1960	1,950		25.4%
1970	1,915		−1.8%
1980	1,623		−15.2%
1990	1,510		−7.0%
2000	1,352		−10.5%
2010	1,162		−14.1%
2020	1,104		−5.0%
U.S. Decennial Census; 2018 Estimate

=== 2020 census ===
As of the 2020 census, Gettysburg had a population of 1,104. The median age was 49.0 years. 21.2% of residents were under the age of 18 and 27.9% of residents were 65 years of age or older. For every 100 females there were 94.4 males, and for every 100 females age 18 and over there were 89.5 males age 18 and over.

0.0% of residents lived in urban areas, while 100.0% lived in rural areas.

There were 490 households in Gettysburg, of which 23.7% had children under the age of 18 living in them. Of all households, 50.8% were married-couple households, 18.4% were households with a male householder and no spouse or partner present, and 26.3% were households with a female householder and no spouse or partner present. About 37.3% of all households were made up of individuals and 20.8% had someone living alone who was 65 years of age or older.

There were 610 housing units, of which 19.7% were vacant. The homeowner vacancy rate was 4.9% and the rental vacancy rate was 11.8%.

Racial composition as of the 2020 census
Race	Number	Percent
White	1,009	91.4%
Black or African American	4	0.4%
American Indian and Alaska Native	37	3.4%
Asian	10	0.9%
Native Hawaiian and Other Pacific Islander	0	0.0%
Some other race	12	1.1%
Two or more races	32	2.9%
Hispanic or Latino (of any race)	25	2.3%

=== 2010 census ===
As of the census of 2010, there were 1,162 people, 534 households, and 310 families living in the city. The population density was 614.8 inhabitants per square mile (237.4/km^{2}). There were 617 housing units at an average density of 326.5 units per square mile (126.1 units/km^{2}). The racial makeup of the city was 97.3% White, 0.3% African American, 1.2% Native American, 0.2% Asian, and 1.0% from two or more races. Hispanic or Latino of any race were 0.6% of the population.

There were 534 households, of which 21.9% had children under the age of 18 living with them, 49.1% were married couples living together, 5.1% had a female householder with no husband present, 3.9% had a male householder with no wife present, and 41.9% were non-families. 37.8% of all households were made up of individuals, and 21.8% had someone living alone who was 65 years of age or older. The average household size was 2.08 and the average family size was 2.74.

The median age in the city was 50.3 years. 19.7% of residents were under the age of 18; 4.7% were between the ages of 18 and 24; 18.1% were from 25 to 44; 29.7% were from 45 to 64; and 27.6% were 65 years of age or older. The gender makeup of the city was 48.4% male and 51.6% female.

=== 2000 census ===
As of the census of 2000, there were 1,352 people, 588 households, and 365 families living in the city. The population density was 725.1 inhabitants per square mile (280.0/km^{2}). There were 683 housing units at an average density of 366.3 units per square mile (141.4 units/km^{2}). The racial makeup of the city was 97.93% White, 1.26% Native American, 0.07% Asian, and 0.74% from two or more races. Hispanic or Latino of any race were 0.15% of the population.

There were 588 households, out of which 26.9% had children under the age of 18 living with them, 52.9% were married couples living together, 6.0% had a female householder with no husband present, and 37.9% were non-families. 36.4% of all households were made up of individuals, and 20.6% had someone living alone who was 65 years of age or older. The average household size was 2.21 and the average family size was 2.88.

In the city, the population was spread out, with 23.9% under the age of 18, 4.0% from 18 to 24, 21.8% from 25 to 44, 24.3% from 45 to 64, and 26.0% who were 65 years of age or older. The median age was 45 years. For every 100 females, there were 92.0 males. For every 100 females age 18 and over, there were 87.8 males.

As of 2000 the median income for a household in the city was $30,469, and the median income for a family was $37,763. Males had a median income of $26,316 versus $16,979 for females. The per capita income for the city was $16,516. About 7.9% of families and 10.7% of the population were below the poverty line, including 14.4% of those under age 18 and 11.3% of those age 65 or over.

== Controversy over Confederate Flag ==
In June 2020, in the midst of national and international protests in opposition to racism following the murder of George Floyd, Gettysburg became the focus of controversy regarding the presence of the Confederate battle flag on the patch of the city's police department. The patch featured overlapping equal-sized U.S. and Confederate flags and a civil-war era cannon along with the city's name, in a nod to the city's namesake, Gettysburg, Pennsylvania, site of the famous battle. The historical reference logo for the police emblem and uniform patch was designed in 2009. George Floyd's uncle resides in Gettysburg and advocated for the logo to change for the two-person police force. The police patch and logo were removed in July 2020.

== See also ==
- List of cities in South Dakota
