= Carr House =

Carr House may refer to:

in the United Kingdom

- Carr House, Bretherton, Lancashire, England
- Carr Houses, a hamlet in Sefton, Merseyside

in Canada

- Emily Carr House

in the United States

- Raymond Carr House, Kingman, Arizona, listed on the National Register of Historic Places (NRHP)
- Carr House (Benicia, California), NRHP-listed
- Thomas Carr District, Thomson, Georgia, NRHP-listed in McDuffie County
- Carr House (Monmouth, Illinois), NRHP-listed
- William V. Carr House, Davenport, Iowa, NRHP-listed
- Ben F. Carr Jr. House, Fulton, Kentucky, NRHP-listed in Fulton County
- Robert P. Carr House, Bowdoinham, Maine, NRHP-listed
- Carr-Jeeves House, Winchester, Massachusetts, NRHP-listed
- Daniel Carr House, Haverhill, New Hampshire, NRHP-listed
- John Carr House, Middlesex, New York, NRHP-listed
- John Price Carr House, Charlotte, North Carolina, NRHP-listed
- Patrick-Carr-Herring House, Clinton, North Carolina, NRHP-listed
- John C. and Binford Carr House, Durham, North Carolina, NRHP-listed
- Titus W. Carr House, Walstonburg, North Carolina, NRHP-listed
- Andrew Carr Sr. House, Minot, North Dakota, NRHP-listed
- George Carr Ranch House, Camargo, Oklahoma, NRHP-listed in Ellis County
- Thomas Carr Farmstead Site (Keeler Site RI-707), Jamestown, Rhode Island, NRHP-listed
- Dr. George W. Carr House, Providence, Rhode Island, NRHP-listed
- Anna Carr Homestead, Bison, South Dakota, NRHP-listed
- Jefferson Davis Carr House, Fort Pierre, South Dakota, NRHP-listed

== See also ==
- Carr's Hall, Terre Haute, Indiana, NRHP-listed
- Carr's Hill, Charlottesville, Virginia, NRHP-listed
- Martin W. Carr School, Somerville, Massachusetts, NRHP-listed
