= National Register of Historic Places listings in Jones County, South Dakota =

Location of Jones County in South Dakota

This is a list of the National Register of Historic Places listings in Jones County, South Dakota.

This is intended to be a complete list of the properties on the National Register of Historic Places in Jones County, South Dakota, United States. The locations of National Register properties for which the latitude and longitude coordinates are included below, may be seen in a map.

There are 5 properties listed on the National Register in the county.

This National Park Service list is complete through NPS recent listings posted March 6, 2026.

== Current listings ==
	Name on the Register	Image	Date listed	Location	City or town	Description
1	Capa Bridge		December 9, 1993 (#93001295)	Local road over the Bad River; 44°07′07″N 100°55′14″W	Murdo	
2	Freier Round Barn	Freier Round Barn	December 14, 1995 (#95001471)	2 miles (3.2 km) north and 2 miles (3.2 km) east of Draper; 43°57′07″N 100°28′57″W	Draper	
3	Immanuel Lutheran Church		February 8, 1988 (#88000022)	14 miles (23 km) north of Interstate 90; 44°05′45″N 100°43′35″W	Murdo	
4	Murdo State Bank	Murdo State Bank	January 16, 2015 (#14001178)	205 Main; 43°53′15″N 100°42′48″W	Murdo	
5	Weigandt Barn	Weigandt Barn	January 9, 2013 (#12000486)	27285 Silver Valley Rd. 43°51′58″N 100°40′09″W	Murdo vicinity	

== Former listings ==
	Name on the Register	Image	Date listed	Date removed	Location	City or town	Description
1	Van Metre Bridge		December 9, 1993 (#93001296)	February 22, 2002	Local rd. over the Bad River	Murdo vicinity	Relocated to Fort Pierre.

== See also ==
- List of National Historic Landmarks in South Dakota
- National Register of Historic Places listings in South Dakota
