= Capa Bridge =

- U.S. National Register of Historic Places
- Location within South Dakota Location within the United States
- Nearest city: Murdo, South Dakota
- Coordinates: 44°7′7″N 100°55′14″W
- Area: less than one acre
- Built: 1919
- Architectural style: Pratt Truss
- MPS: Historic Bridges in South Dakota MPS
- NRHP reference No.: 93001295
- Added to NRHP: December 9, 1993

The Capa Bridge is a historic bridge in rural Jones County, South Dakota. It is located 15.7 miles (25.3 km) west and 9.8 miles (15.8 km) north of Murdo, and about 3 miles (4.8 km) east of Capa, and carries a local road over the Bad River. Its main span is a Pratt through truss 127 feet (39 m) in length, which has been riveted rather than pinned together. The bridge also has five smaller approach spans on the west and two on the east, made of wooden stringers. The bridge piers are either concrete or wood pile, and the outermost abutments are wood pile. The bridge was apparently built in 1919 by a county crew, and is one of only two pre-1920 bridges in the state to use a riveted Pratt truss.

The bridge was listed on the National Register of Historic Places in 1993.

== See also ==
- National Register of Historic Places listings in Jones County, South Dakota
- List of bridges on the National Register of Historic Places in South Dakota
