= National Register of Historic Places listings in Stanley County, South Dakota =

Location of Stanley County in South Dakota

This is a list of the National Register of Historic Places listings in Stanley County, South Dakota.

This is intended to be a complete list of the properties on the National Register of Historic Places in Stanley County, South Dakota, United States. The locations of National Register properties for which the latitude and longitude coordinates are included below, may be seen in a map.

There are 12 properties listed on the National Register in the county, including 2 National Historic Landmarks.

This National Park Service list is complete through NPS recent listings posted December 19, 2025.

== Current listings ==
| | Name on the Register | Image | Date listed | Location | City or town | Description |
|---|---|---|---|---|---|---|
| 1 | American Legion Community Hall | American Legion Community Hall | July 31, 2017 (#100001403) | 115 Deadwood St. 44°21′17″N 100°22′17″W | Fort Pierre | |
| 2 | Antelope Creek Site (39ST55) | | August 14, 1986 (#86002737) | Address Restricted | Fort Pierre | |
| 3 | Bloody Hand Site (39ST230) | | August 14, 1986 (#86002736) | Address Restricted | Fort Pierre | |
| 4 | Breeden Village | | June 2, 2003 (#03000503) | Address Restricted | Fort Pierre | |
| 5 | Jefferson Davis Carr House | Jefferson Davis Carr House | March 5, 1982 (#82003942) | 236 W. 2nd Ave. 44°21′17″N 100°22′33″W | Fort Pierre | |
| 6 | Fort Pierre Chouteau Site | Fort Pierre Chouteau Site | April 3, 1976 (#76001756) | North of Fort Pierre; 44°23′27″N 100°22′58″W | Fort Pierre | |
| 7 | Fort Pierre II (39ST217) | | August 15, 1988 (#88000732) | Address Restricted | Fort Pierre | |
| 8 | La Verendrye Site | La Verendrye Site | August 7, 1974 (#74001899) | Off U.S. Route 83; 44°21′19″N 100°22′40″W | Fort Pierre | |
| 9 | Lower Antelope Creek Site | | September 15, 1982 (#82003943) | Address Restricted | Fort Pierre | |
| 10 | Old Fort Pierre School | Old Fort Pierre School | November 25, 1977 (#77001255) | 2nd Ave. and 2nd St. 44°21′17″N 100°22′31″W | Fort Pierre | |
| 11 | Stockgrowers Bank Building | Stockgrowers Bank Building | November 11, 1977 (#77001256) | Deadwood and Main Sts. 44°21′16″N 100°22′10″W | Fort Pierre | |
| 12 | Gaylord Sumner House | Gaylord Sumner House | December 21, 1977 (#77001257) | 2nd and Wandel Sts. 44°20′52″N 100°22′15″W | Fort Pierre | |
| 13 | United Church of Christ, Congregational | United Church of Christ, Congregational | December 21, 1977 (#77001258) | 2nd and Main St. 44°21′13″N 100°22′29″W | Fort Pierre | |

== See also ==
- List of National Historic Landmarks in South Dakota
- National Register of Historic Places listings in South Dakota
