= United Church of Christ, Congregational =

United Church of Christ, Congregational may refer to:

- United Church of Christ, Congregational (Burlington, Massachusetts), associated, with DR status, with the National Register of Historic Places in Middlesex County, Massachusetts
- United Church of Christ, Congregational (Fort Pierre, South Dakota), listed on the National Register of Historic Places in Stanley County, South Dakota
