= Verendrye Site =

- U.S. National Register of Historic Places
- U.S. National Historic Landmark
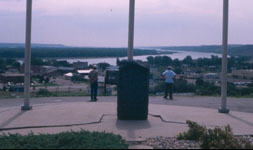
- Monument at the site

- Location within South Dakota Location within the United States
- Location: Verendrye Dr., Fort Pierre, South Dakota
- Coordinates: 44°21′20″N 100°22′43″W
- NRHP reference No.: 74001899

Significant dates
- Added to NRHP: August 7, 1974
- Designated NHL: July 17, 1991

The Verendrye Site is an historical archaeological site off Verendrye Drive in Fort Pierre, Stanley County, South Dakota, United States. Now a small public park, it is the place where the La Vérendrye brothers, the first known Europeans to explore this area, placed a lead plate bearing the coat of arms of France, to claim the territory for their homeland, during their 1742–1743 expedition to the Rocky Mountains.

This site was declared a National Historic Landmark in 1991. A monument has been erected at the site to explain the history.

== Setting ==
The Verendrye Site occupies a low hill overlooking the western bank of the Missouri River, which flows south between Fort Pierre and Pierre. It is accessed via a paved drive from Verendrye Drive to the north. A small circular turnaround has a few spaces for parking, and the noted monument is directly adjacent.

The marker is made of granite and stands about 4 feet (1.2 m) high. It bears this inscription: Here on // March 30, 1743 // The Verendryes // Buried a lead // tablet to claim // this region for // France. This // tablet found // on Feb. 16, 1913, is // the first written // record of the // visit of white // men to // South Dakota. In smaller type, the inscription continues: Erected by // State Historical // Society // and Ft. Pierre // Commercial Club // 1933.

== History ==
Pierre Gaultier de Varennes, sieur de La Vérendrye was a leading explorer for New France, and with his four sons he led many early exploratory expeditions into the northern plains of North America. By the 1730s, the Vérendryes had established several trading posts in what are now North Dakota and Canada. Their expedition of 1742-43 sought to extend the range of influence further west, with an ultimate goal of reaching the Pacific Ocean. In this they were unsuccessful.

They are believed to have explored into present-day Montana and Wyoming, but there is significant scholarly debate about exactly which Native American peoples they encountered and where they went. The brothers leading the expedition (probably Louis-Joseph Gaultier de La Vérendrye and François de La Vérendrye, but sources of the expedition are ambiguous) documented the secret placement of a 8 1/2-by-6 1/2-inch (220 by 170 mm) lead plate bearing the French coat of arms and text in Latin about the King of France on a bluff overlooking the Missouri. They told the local Native Americans that the cairn they built over the site was a memorial of their passage, but it marked their claim of the territory for France.

The lead plate was rediscovered in 1913 by children playing on the eroding hillside. It is now held by the state historical society, and the city has preserved the site as a park. A 4-foot (1.2 m) monument was erected in 1933 at the site by the state historical society and local chamber of commerce, marking it for its historical interest. Flags of the US, France and South Dakota are flown here. The area has been explored for archeological artifacts. Discovery of the plate has enabled scholars of the late 20th and early 21st centuries to clarify some aspects of the expedition's travels. The commemorative granite marker was placed in 1933.

== See also ==
- List of National Historic Landmarks in South Dakota
- National Register of Historic Places listings in Stanley County, South Dakota
