= Immanuel Lutheran Church (Murdo, South Dakota) =

Historic church in South Dakota, United States

- U.S. National Register of Historic Places
- Location within South Dakota Location within the United States
- Nearest city: Murdo, South Dakota
- Coordinates: 44°5′45″N 100°43′35″W
- Area: less than one acre
- Built: 1924
- Architect: Louis Anker
- Architectural style: Nave Plan
- NRHP reference No.: 88000022
- Added to NRHP: February 8, 1988

The Immanuel Lutheran Church is a historic church in rural Jones County, South Dakota. It is located about 14 miles (23 km) north of Murdo, at a site that was settled in the early 20th century by an immigrant Norwegian population. It is a simple wood-frame structure, with wooden clapboard siding, a gable roof, and a small tower rising in the front (eastern) facade. Despite the exterior severity, its interior is more richly appointed, with Gothic Revival woodwork adorning the pews, railings, and pulpit. The church was built by this small Norwegian community in 1924, the congregation having met in less formal settings after its founding in 1907. Use of the church declined beginning in the 1930s; it underwent restoration in the late 1980s.

The church was listed on the National Register of Historic Places in 1988.

== See also ==
- National Register of Historic Places listings in Jones County, South Dakota
