= Lance Creek (South Dakota) =

Stream in Stanley County, South Dakota, U.S.

Coordinates: 44°15′26″N 100°39′02″W

Lance Creek is a stream in Stanley County, South Dakota, in the United States. It is a tributary of the Bad River.

Lance Creek was named for an old Indian lance found there.

== See also ==
- List of rivers of South Dakota
