= Weigandt Barn =

- U.S. National Register of Historic Places
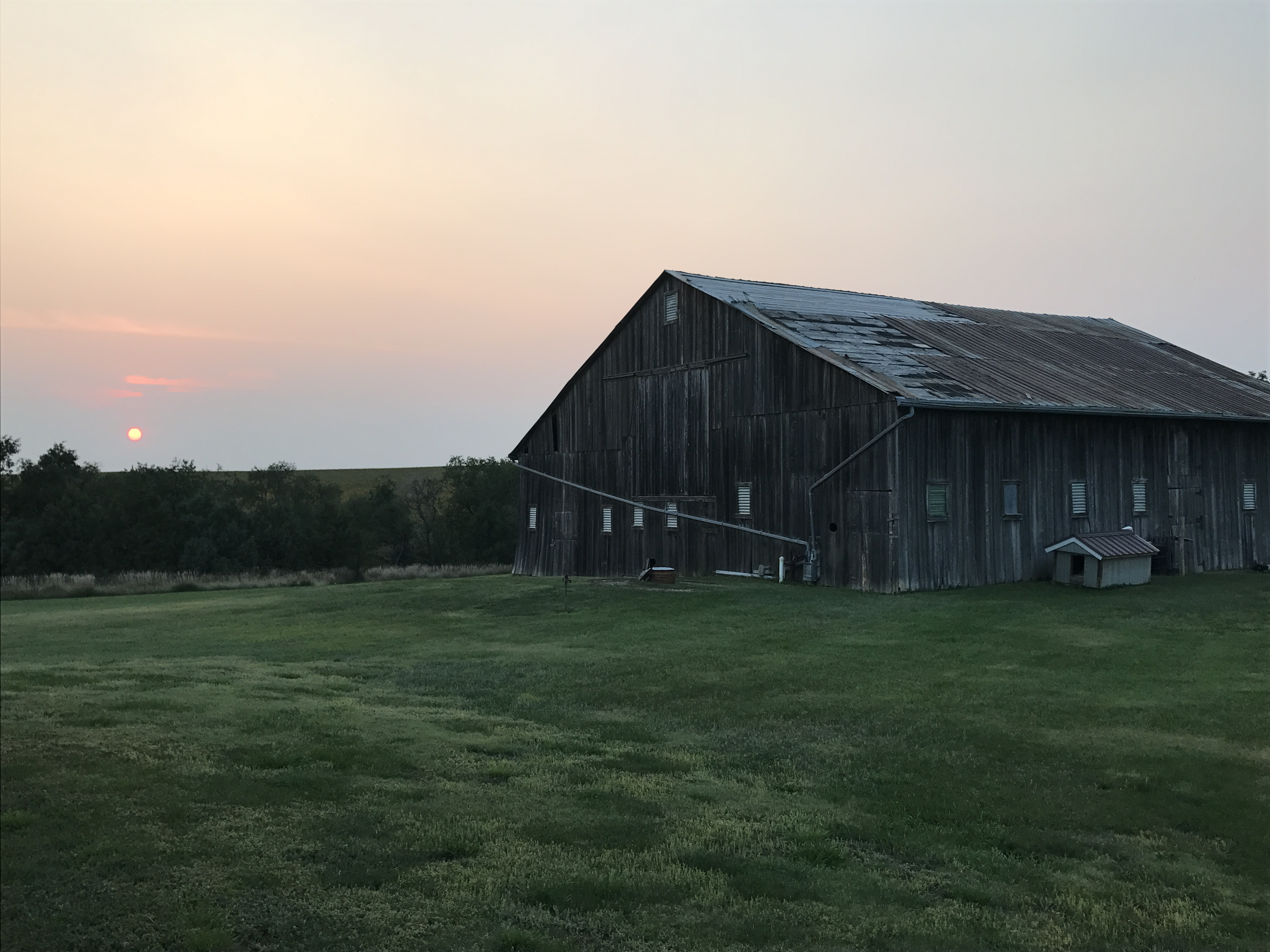
- Weigandt Barn in 2017

- Location within South Dakota Location within the United States
- Nearest city: Murdo, South Dakota
- Coordinates: 43°51′58″N 100°40′9″W
- Area: less than one acre
- NRHP reference No.: 12000486
- Added to NRHP: January 29, 2013

The Weigandt Barn is a historic barn at 27285 Silver Valley Road in rural Jones County, South Dakota. It is a rectangular structure on a fieldstone and concrete foundation, and measures 64 by 70 feet (20 m × 21 m). Built in 1917 by August Weigandt, it is a regionally unusual example of a Western Feeder barn, a type not usually found in the West River (western half) of the state. Farmers in the area generally "finished" their cattle on grass, and did not need feeder barns.

The barn was listed on the National Register of Historic Places in 1995.

== Gallery ==
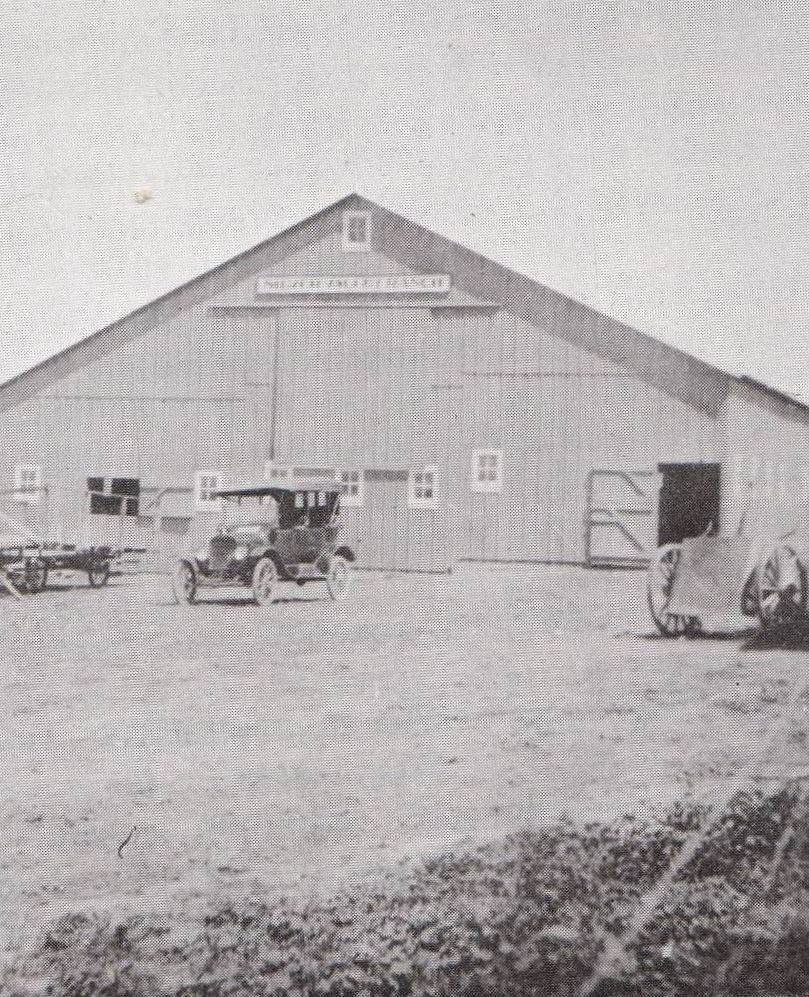
Weigandt Barn in 1917

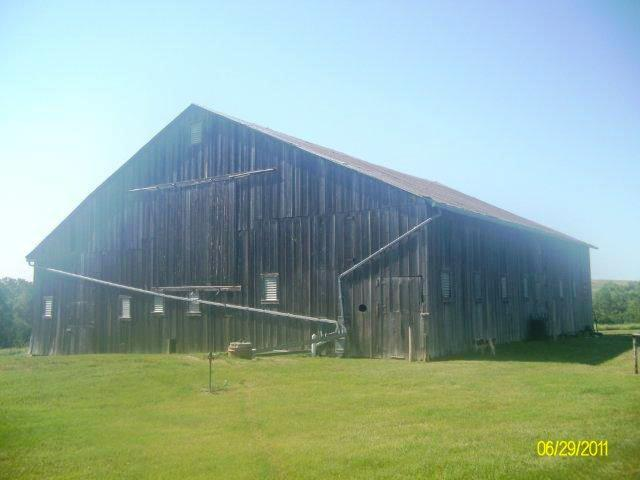
Weigandt Barn in 2011

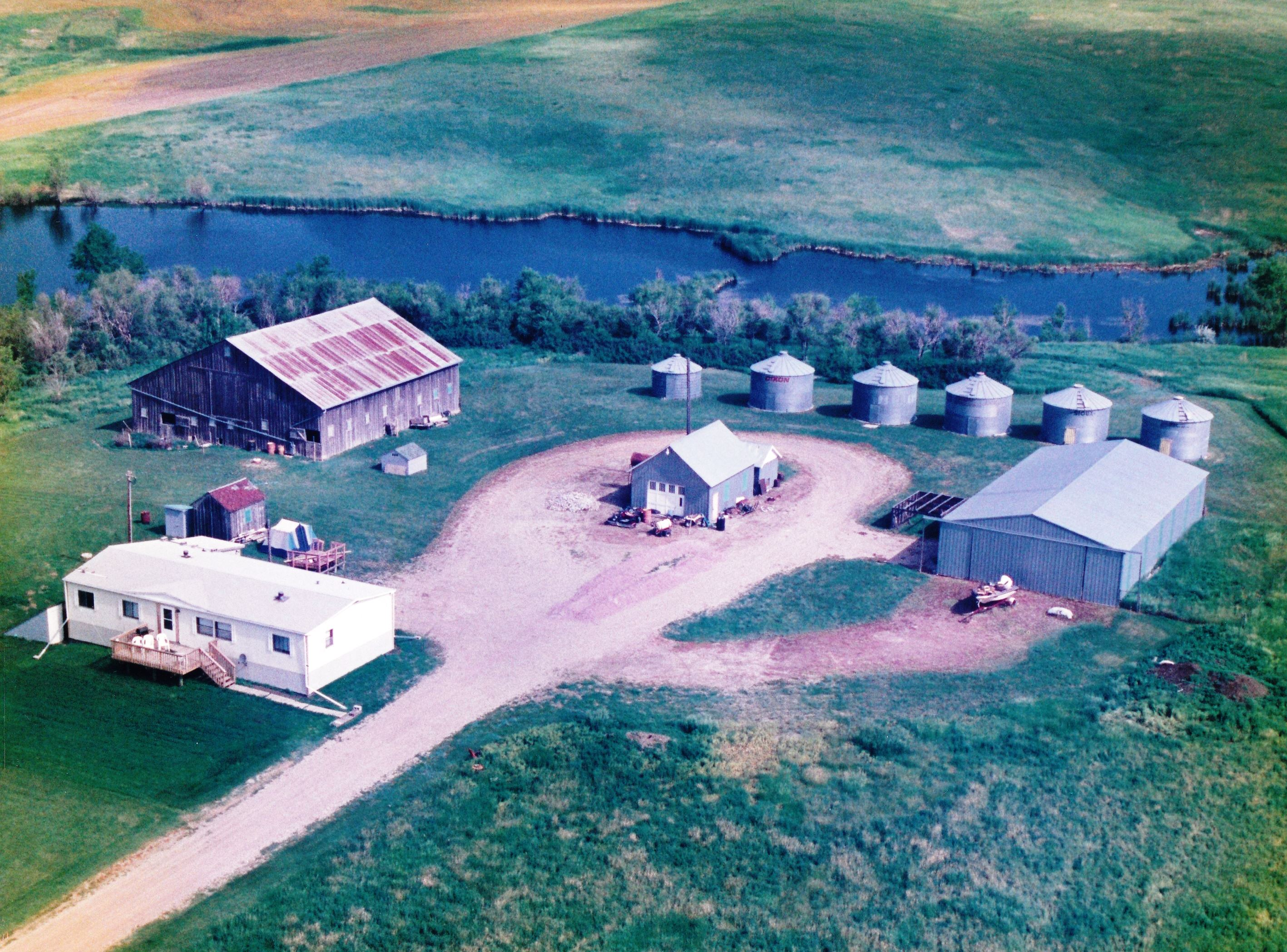
Birds-eye view of Weigandt Farm, with barn at upper-left

== See also ==
- National Register of Historic Places listings in Jones County, South Dakota
