= Okaton, South Dakota =

- Census-designated place
- Location in Jones County and the state of South Dakota
- Country: United States
- State: South Dakota
- Counties: Jones

Area
  - Total: 29.8 sq mi (77.2 km^{2})
  - Land: 29.8 sq mi (77.1 km^{2})
  - Water: 0.039 sq mi (0.1 km^{2})
- Elevation: 2,175 ft (663 m)

Population (2020)
  - Total: 31
  - Density: 1.2/sq mi (0.47/km^{2})
- ZIP code: 57562
- GNIS feature ID: 2393170

Okaton is a census-designated place (CDP) in Jones County, South Dakota, United States. As of the 2020 census, the population was 31.

== History ==
Okaton had its start in 1906 by the building of the Milwaukee Railroad through that territory. It had a post office, but this closed in 2013; postal service is now provided from Murdo. There was also, until recently, a "western town" tourist attraction with a petting zoo and a functioning store. The town's entire business district had been on the town road furthest from the interstate highway, which bypassed the town; but which was closest to the railroad tracks. The closure of the railroad, followed by the interstate's placement, largely accounted for the town's dwindling.

== Geography ==
According to the United States Census Bureau, Okaton has a total area of 29.8 square miles (77 km^{2}), of which 29.8 square miles (77 km^{2}) is land and 0.04 square miles (0.10 km^{2}) of it (0.10%) is water.

== Demographics ==
Historical population
Census	Pop.	Note	%±
2000	29		—
2010	36		24.1%
2020	31		−13.9%
U.S. Decennial Census

As of the census of 2000, there were 29 people, 14 households, and 7 families residing in the CDP. The population density was 1.0 people per square mile (0.4/km^{2}). There were 18 housing units at an average density of 0.6/sq mi (0.2/km^{2}). The racial makeup of the CDP was 75.86% White, 20.69% from two or more races, and 3.45% Pacific Islander.

There were 14 households, out of which 21.4% had children under the age of 18 living with them, 57.1% were married couples living together, and 42.9% were non-families. 42.9% of all households were made up of individuals, and 21.4% had someone living alone who was 65 years of age or older. The average household size was 2.07 and the average family size was 2.88.

In the CDP, the population was spread out, with 17.2% under the age of 18, 13.8% from 18 to 24, 13.8% from 25 to 44, 27.6% from 45 to 64, and 27.6% who were 65 years of age or older. The median age was 48 years. For every 100 females, there were 123.1 males. For every 100 females age 18 and over, there were 140.0 males.

The median income for a household in the CDP was $23,750, and the median income for a family was $30,625. Males had a median income of $11,250 versus $28,750 for females. The per capita income for the CDP was $13,859. None of the population or families were below the poverty line.
