= Freier Round Barn =

- U.S. National Register of Historic Places
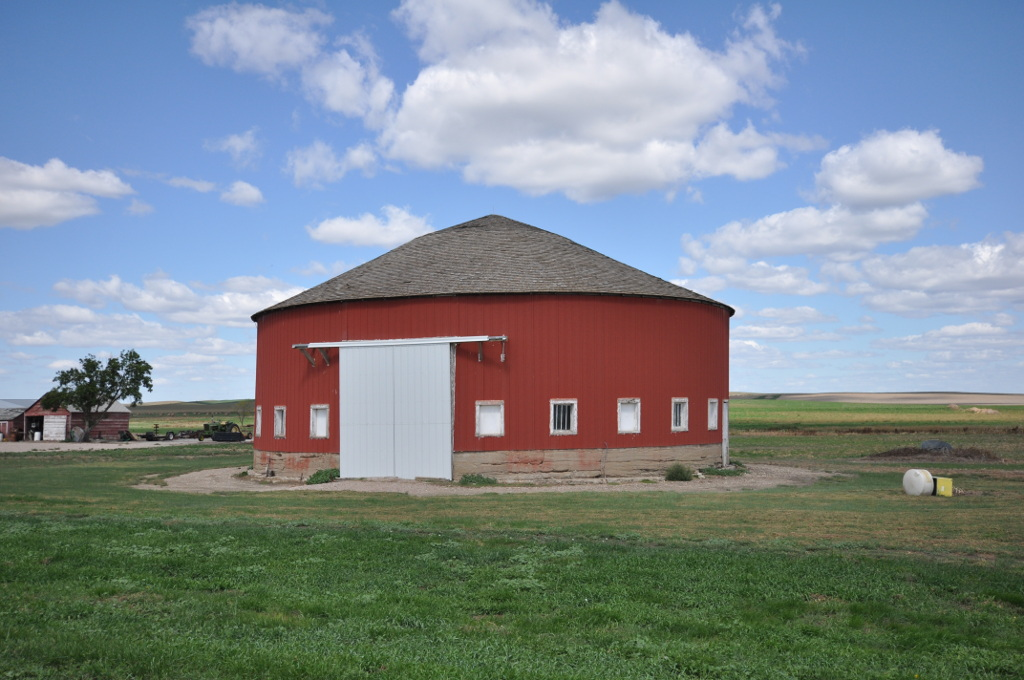

- Location within South Dakota Location within the United States
- Nearest city: Draper, South Dakota
- Coordinates: 43°57′7″N 100°28′57″W
- Area: less than one acre
- Built: 1918
- Built by: M.E. Studervant
- Architectural style: Round Barn
- MPS: South Dakota's Round and Polygonal Barns and Pavilions MPS
- NRHP reference No.: 95001471
- Added to NRHP: December 14, 1995

The Freier Round Barn is a historic round barn in rural Jones County, South Dakota, United States. It is located on the north side of County Highway 16, northeast of Draper. It is very nearly circular, measuring 60 feet (18 m) in diameter, with 18 sash windows and four doors. The barn was built in 1918, from a pre-cut kit ordered by catalog. It is the only known example of a pre-cut wood frame barn in the state.

The barn was listed on the National Register of Historic Places in 1995.

== See also ==
- National Register of Historic Places listings in Jones County, South Dakota
