= Fort Pierre Chouteau =

- Fort Pierre Chouteau Site
- U.S. National Register of Historic Places
- U.S. National Historic Landmark
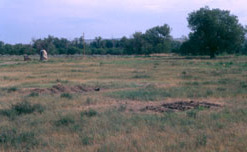
- Fields at the site

- Location within South Dakota Location within the United States
- Nearest city: Fort Pierre, South Dakota
- Coordinates: 44°23′21″N 100°23′28″W
- NRHP reference No.: 76001756

Significant dates
- Added to NRHP: April 3, 1976
- Designated NHL: July 17, 1991

Fort Pierre Chouteau, also just Fort Pierre, was a major trading post and military outpost in the mid-19th century on the west bank of the Missouri River in what is now central South Dakota. Established in 1832 by Pierre Chouteau, Jr. of St. Louis, Missouri, whose family were major fur traders, this facility operated through the 1850s.

It was for many years the largest trading post in the northern Great Plains and a major trans-shipment point for buffalo furs. The archaeological remains of the fort, located in Stanley County just north of the town of Fort Pierre, were declared a National Historic Landmark in 1991.

== Setting ==
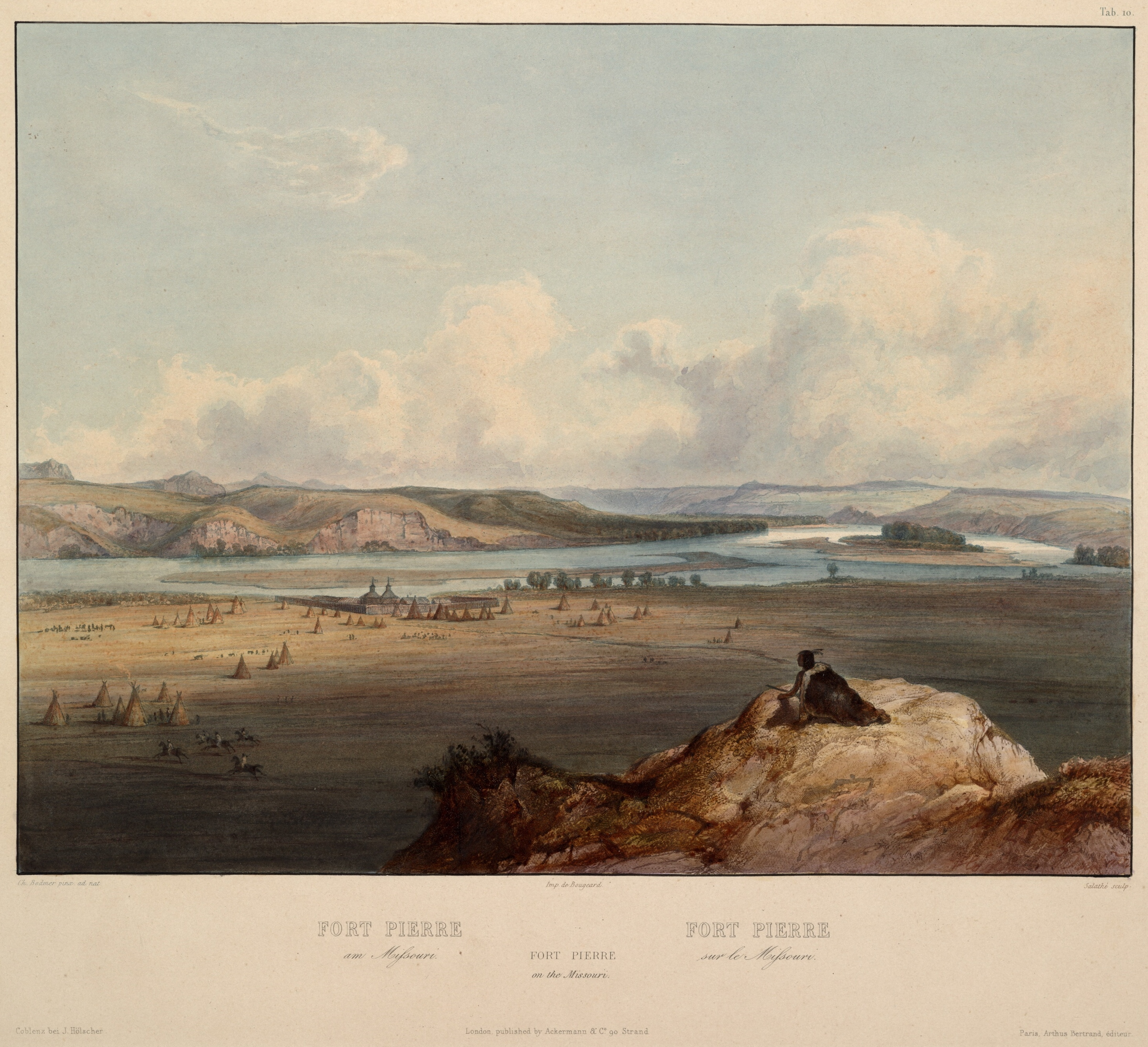
Fort Pierre on the Missouri. Painting by Karl Bodmer, who visited the fort in 1833. View from the plains.

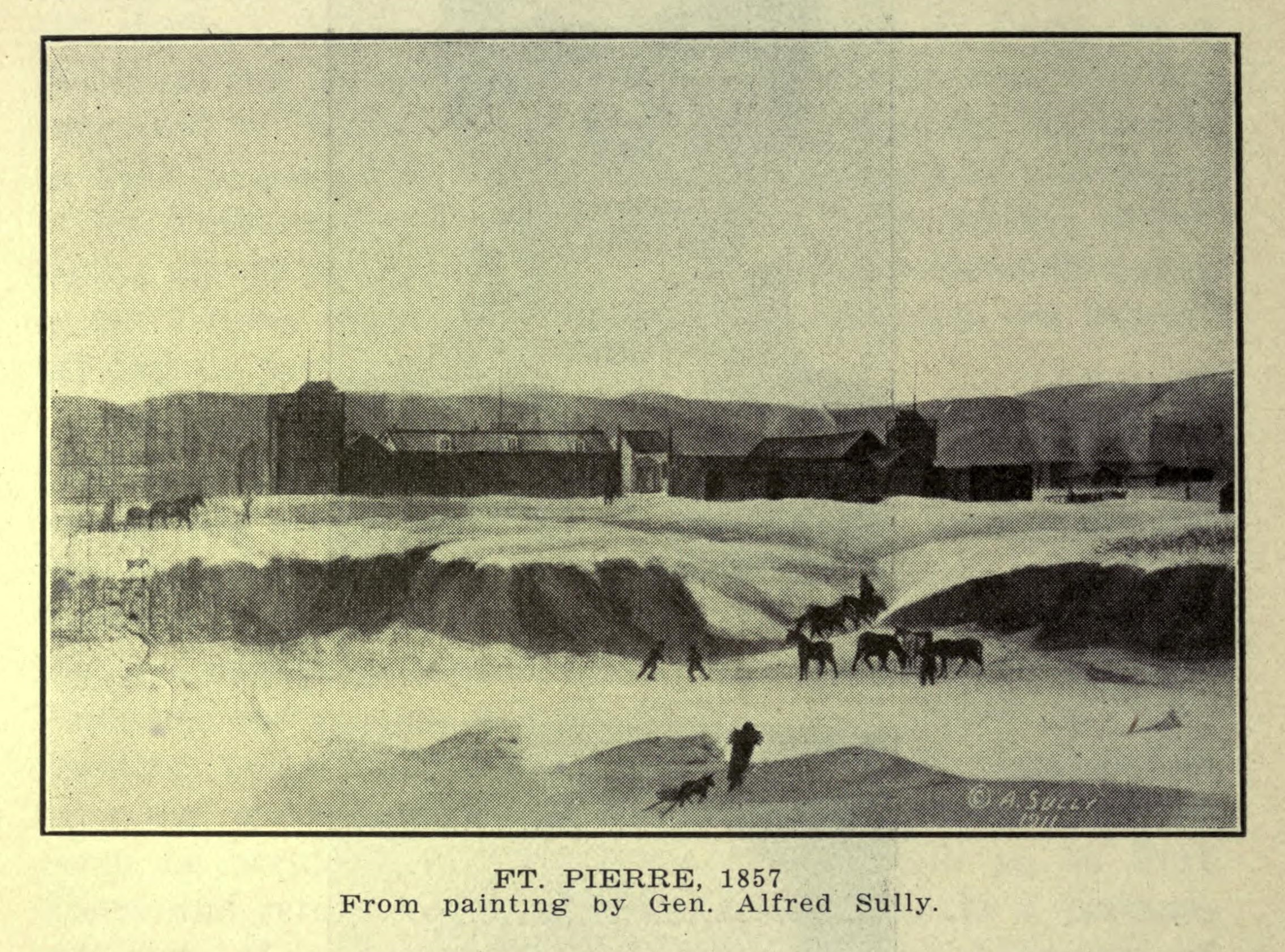
Fort Pierre, South Dakota, 1857. Engraving of the trading post from a painting by General Alfred Sully. View from across the Missouri.

Fort Pierre Chouteau was located just north of the confluence of the Missouri and Bad rivers, on a low terrace above the west bank of the Missouri River. This site was of strategic importance for several reasons. It served as a midpoint among the outposts of the American Fur Company (AFC), which monopolized trade on the upper Missouri by 1830, and as an endpoint for a major overland shipment route to Fort Laramie in present-day eastern Wyoming.

This fort was built as a replacement for Fort Tecumseh, located on what is now LaFramboise Island closer to the river confluence. The island fort had been built in 1817 by the Columbia Fur Company, the AFC's predecessor in the regional fur trade. That fort was poorly sited and subject to flooding from the river. Some of its timber elements were reused in the construction of Fort Pierre Chouteau.

== History ==
The first people of European descent to encounter Native Americans in the Fort Pierre area were a pair of French explorers, the La Vérendrye brothers, during their 1743–44 expedition. They buried an inscribed lead plate on a hill near the confluence of the Missouri and Bad Rivers, claiming the territory for the King as part of New France.

The next major non-native visitors were members of the American Lewis and Clark Expedition, who camped in the area in 1804. They were commissioned by the United States government to explore and survey major areas of the Louisiana Purchase of 1803. In 1817 trader Joseph La Framboise, Jr., son of parents from Quebec and Ontario who were fur traders in the region, established a French-Canadian trading post here. His mother was Métis and took over the post in Michilimackinac, Michigan after her husband's death. The development of the trading post marked the start of permanent white settlement of the Missouri/Bad River area.

In 1822, former fur traders for the privately held, British Hudson's Bay Company established the Columbia Fur Company in competition. They built Fort Tecumseh as well as other outposts on the Upper Missouri. In 1827 John Jacob Astor through his American Fur Company, a near monopoly, purchased the assets of the Columbia Fur Company. The AFC turned management of the Upper Missouri Operation (UMO) over to Bernard Pratte and Pierre Chouteau, Jr. of St. Louis, Missouri. When Chouteau ascended the Missouri River in 1832 on the maiden voyage of the steamship Yellowstone, he ordered construction of what was formally dubbed Fort Pierre in his honor. Astor retired from the fur business in 1834, and Chouteau purchased the Fort Pierre operation. He eventually bought out Pratte and became the principal operator of this post and its fur trade.

Fort Pierre and the surrounding community rapidly developed as a major center for Chouteau's trading business. In addition to its central location for company logistics, it was also generally surrounded by a settlement of Lakota Sioux and other Plains Indian tribes, who traded buffalo furs for American and European goods. At its height in the 1850s, the company was part of a complex trading network extending from the Rocky Mountains to the Eastern United States and Europe: it shipped 100,000 fur robes through Fort Pierre.

In the 1850s the American bison or buffalo was subjected to extreme over-huntings, caused in part by the fur trade and high world demand, but also spurred by the advance of American railroads into the western frontier. There was an increase in the number of men who hunted the animals for sport and killed as many as they could shoot. Pierre Chouteau sold the fort that bore his name to the United States government in 1854. The government found the facilities inadequate and abandoned them in 1857 in favor of Fort Randall to the south. Salvageable buildings and materials were transported to Fort Randall, and any surviving timbers were used to fuel steamboats on the river. The trade in buffalo furs effectively ended by the early 1860s, when the United States Army established a presence in the region.

== After closure ==
Fort Pierre Chouteau became part of reservation lands assigned to the Sioux in the Treaty of Fort Laramie of 1868. When the Dakota Territory was partitioned in 1889 and the Sioux reservation was reduced in size, the fort's land became available for homesteading. It was used as pasture land until 1930, when it was acquired by the state of South Dakota. The state property was further enlarged by a land gift in 1970. Archaeological activity in the 1980s identified a number of elements of the fort's structure, confirming its location.

The site is now an open meadow just north of the city limits of Fort Pierre, on the north side of Fort Chouteau Road. It was added to the National Register of Historic Places in 1976 and became a National Historic Landmark in 1991. A stone marker is located near the center of the site, accessible by a gravel path. There are no visible remains of the fort's buildings and infrastructure. The state is developing plans for improved access and interpretation at the site.

== See also ==
- List of National Historic Landmarks in South Dakota
- National Register of Historic Places listings in Stanley County, South Dakota
