= List of National Historic Landmarks in South Dakota =

The List of National Historic Landmarks in South Dakota contains the landmarks designated by the U.S. Federal Government for the U.S. state of South Dakota.

South Dakota National Historic Landmarks (clickable map)

There are 16 National Historic Landmarks (NHLs) in South Dakota, one of which is shared with Iowa and listed by the National Park Service as primarily in that state. They have been designated in 13 of South Dakota's 66 counties. Most are along rivers, long the chief areas of human settlement in this arid place.

== Key ==
| | National Historic Landmark |
| ^{†} | National Historic Landmark District |
| ^{#} | National Historic Site, National Historical Park, National Memorial, or National Monument |
| ^{*} | Delisted Landmark |

== Current NHLs ==
| | Landmark name | Image | Date designated | Location | County | Description |
|---|---|---|---|---|---|---|
| 1 | Arzberger Site | Arzberger Site | July 19, 1964 (#66000715) | Pierre; Address Restricted | Hughes | Archaeological site of a fortified 15th-century Native American village, believed to be Arikara. |
| 2^{†} | Battle Mountain Sanitarium, National Home for Disabled Volunteer Soldiers | Battle Mountain Sanitarium, National Home for Disabled Volunteer Soldiers | June 17, 2011 (#11000561) | Hot Springs; 43°26′11″N 103°28′44″W | Fall River | Facility built in 1907 to treat veterans suffering rheumatism and/or tuberculosis |
| 3 | Bear Butte | Bear Butte | December 21, 1981 (#73001746) | Sturgis; 44°28′33″N 103°25′37″W | Meade | |
| 4 | Blood Run Site | Blood Run Site | May 22, 1970 (#70000246) | Shindler, South Dakota and Granite, Iowa; 43°28′N 96°35′W | Lincoln, South Dakota and Lyon, Iowa | A Native American archaeological site, extending into Iowa |
| 5 | Bloom Site | Bloom Site | July 19, 1964 (#66000714) | Bloom; Address Restricted | Hanson | This fortified archaeological site preserves the remains of about 25 rectangular houses dating to c. 1000 CE. The site also once contained several burial mounds, which were later destroyed by cultivation. The site was perhaps occupied by ancestors of the Mandan. |
| 6 | Crow Creek Site | Crow Creek Site | July 19, 1964 (#66000710) | Chamberlain; 43°58′48″N 99°19′54″W | Buffalo | Site of a prehistoric Native American massacre circa 1325. |
| 7^{†} | Deadwood Historic District | Deadwood Historic District | July 4, 1961 (#66000716) | Deadwood; 44°22′19″N 103°44′00″W | Lawrence | Historic mining town. |
| 8 | Fort Pierre Chouteau Site | Fort Pierre Chouteau Site | July 17, 1991 (#76001756) | Fort Pierre; 44°23′21″N 100°23′28″W | Stanley | |
| 9^{†} | Fort Thompson Mounds | Fort Thompson Mounds | July 19, 1964 (#66000711) | Fort Thompson; 44°02′00″N 99°22′40″W | Buffalo | A complex of many burial mounds along the Missouri River |
| 10 | Frawley Ranch | Frawley Ranch | May 5, 1977 (#74001893) | Spearfish; 44°28′30″N 103°42′38″W | Lawrence | |
| 11 | Langdeau Site | Langdeau Site | July 19, 1964 (#66000717) | Lower Brule; Address Restricted | Lyman | |
| 12 | Mitchell Site | Mitchell Site | July 19, 1964 (#66000712) | Mitchell; 43°44′30″N 98°02′02″W | Davison | Archaeological site of a prehistoric Mississippian culture village. Open to the public. |
| 13 | Molstad Village | Molstad Village | July 19, 1964 (#66000713) | Mobridge; 45°27′25″N 100°21′15″W | Dewey | A fortified prehistoric village of five circular house rings enclosed by a ditch comprises this archaeological site. It represents a transitional period as the Mandan, Hidatsa, and Arikara peoples arose from the mixing of Central Plains and Middle Missouri cultural traits. |
| 14 | Vanderbilt Archeological Site | | February 18, 1997 (#97000342) | Pollock; Address Restricted | Campbell | |
| 15 | Verendrye Site | Verendrye Site | July 17, 1991 (#74001899) | Fort Pierre; 44°21′20″N 100°22′43″W | Stanley | |
| 16 | Wounded Knee | Wounded Knee | December 21, 1965 (#66000719) | Pine Ridge Indian Reservation; 43°08′28″N 102°21′46″W | Oglala Lakota | |

== Historic areas in the United States National Park System ==
National Historic Sites, National Historic Parks, National Memorials, and certain other areas listed in the National Park system are historic landmarks of national importance that are highly protected already, often before the inauguration of the NHL program in 1960, and are often not also named NHLs per se. Two additional South Dakota sites have national historical importance and have been designated as National Historic Site and as a National Memorial by the National Park System.

| | Monument name | Image | Established | Locality | County | Description |
|---|---|---|---|---|---|---|
| 1 | Minuteman Missile National Historic Site | A view of the silo from above. | December 29, 1999 | | Jackson and Pennington | |
| 2 | Mount Rushmore National Memorial | | March 3, 1925 | Black Hills | Pennington | |

== See also ==
- National Register of Historic Places listings in South Dakota
- History of South Dakota
- List of National Natural Landmarks in South Dakota
