= Murdo State Bank =

- U.S. National Register of Historic Places
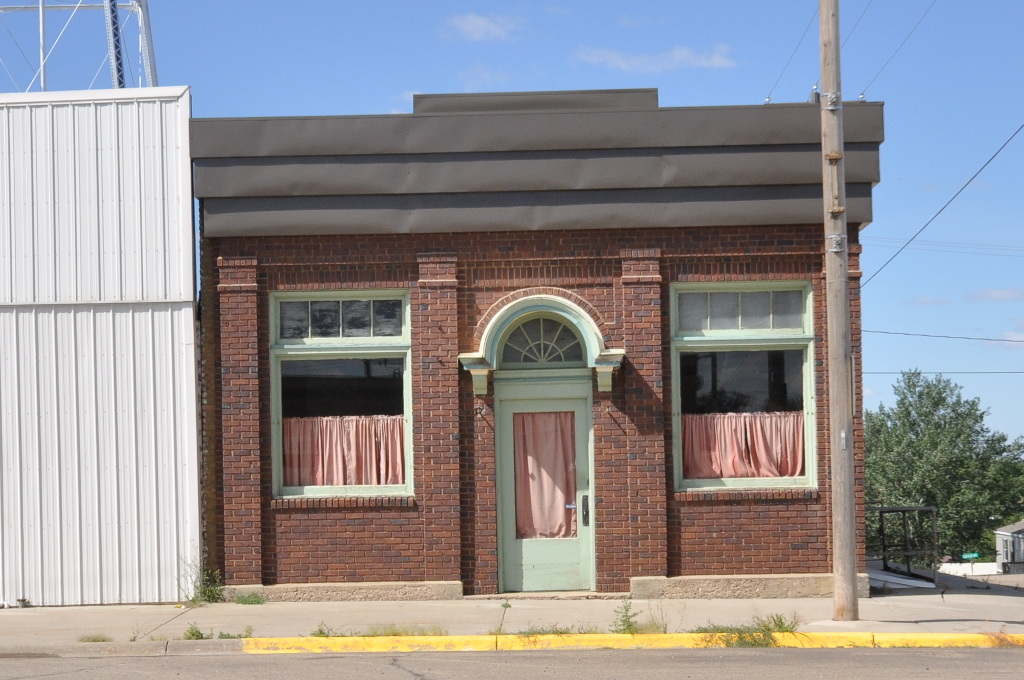

- Location within South Dakota Location within the United States
- Location: 205 Main St., Murdo, South Dakota
- Coordinates: 43°53′15″N 100°42′48″W
- Area: less than one acre
- NRHP reference No.: 14001178
- Added to NRHP: January 16, 2015

The Murdo State Bank, at 205 Main St. in Murdo, South Dakota, was built in 1920. It was listed on the National Register of Historic Places in 2015.

The bank was organized in 1906.
