= Jefferson Davis Carr House =

Historic house in South Dakota, United States

- U.S. National Register of Historic Places
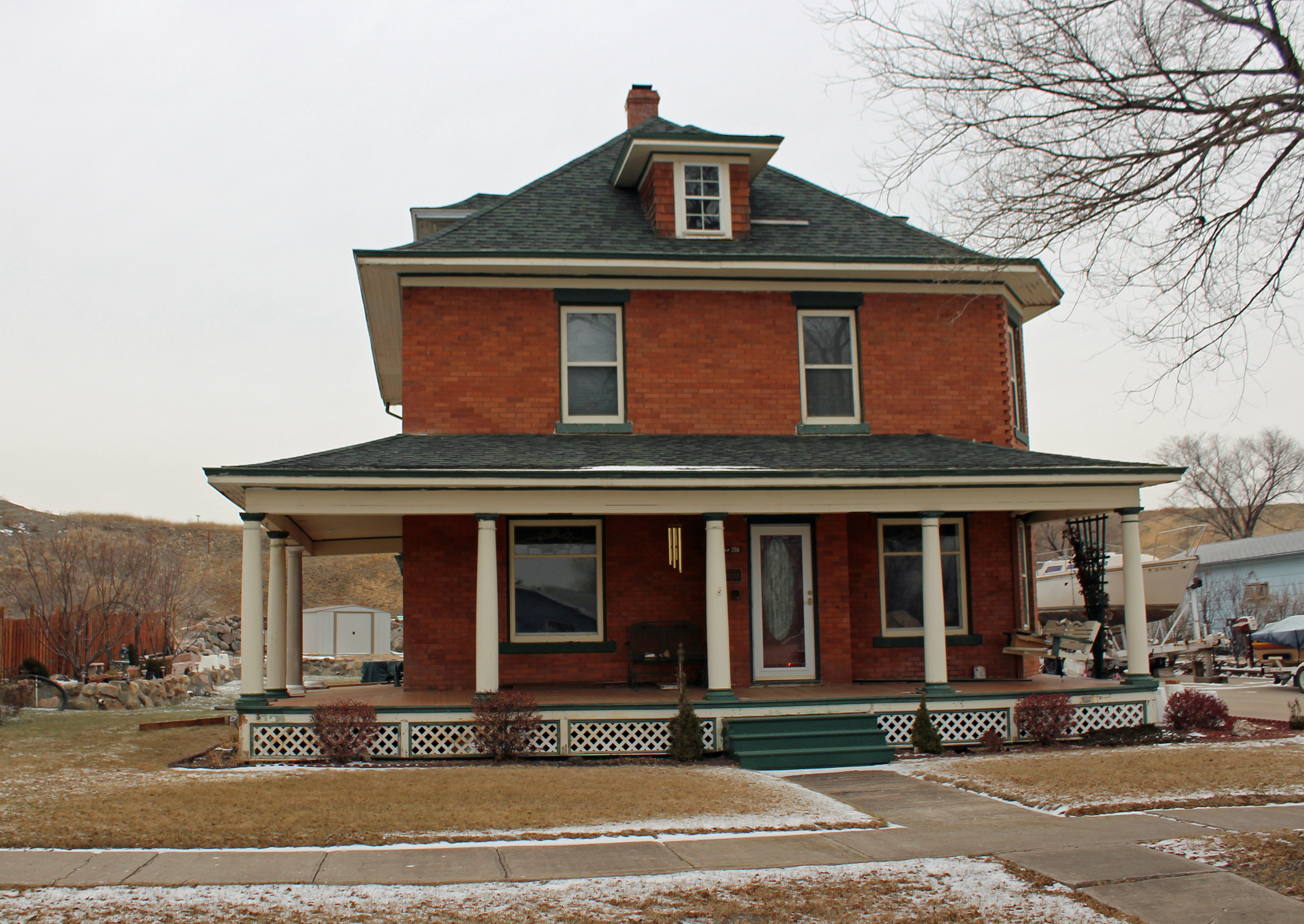
- Location: 236 W. 2nd Ave., Fort Pierre, South Dakota
- Coordinates: 44°21′17″N 100°22′33″W
- Area: less than one acre
- Built: 1906
- Built by: Wagner, Carl
- Architectural style: Colonial Revival, Italianate, Georgian Revival
- NRHP reference No.: 82003942
- Added to NRHP: March 5, 1982

The Jefferson Davis Carr House in Fort Pierre, South Dakota was built in 1906. It was listed on the National Register of Historic Places in 1982. It is: "A somewhat rare surviving domestic building constructed of locally manufactured materials, the Jefferson Davis Carr House is significant as a local architectural landmark and as an example of early settlement patterns in Stanley County."
