= Zickrick Township, Jones County, South Dakota =

Township in Jones County, South Dakota

Coordinates: 43.7708°N 100.5156°W

Zickrick is a township in Jones County, South Dakota, United States. It is 1,985 feet (605 m) above sea level.
