= Carr House (Benicia, California) =

- U.S. National Register of Historic Places
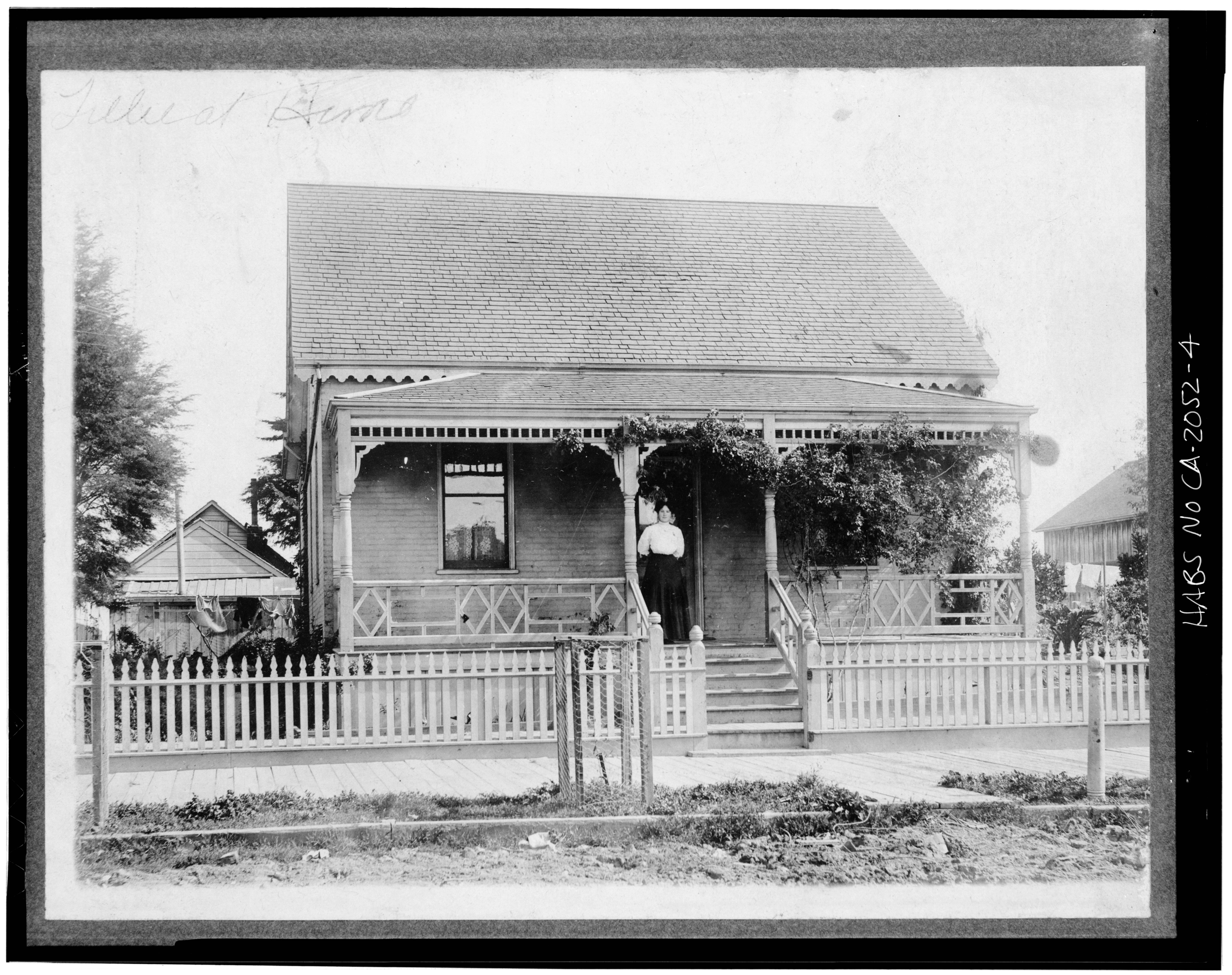

- Location within California Location within the United States
- Location: 165 E. D St, Benicia, California
- Coordinates: 38°2′49″N 122°9′28″W
- Area: 0.1 acres (0.040 ha)
- Built: 1850s
- Demolished: by c. 2000
- NRHP reference No.: 79000555
- Added to NRHP: September 13, 1979

The Carr House is a now demolished historic building in Benicia, California, United States. It was added to the U.S. National Register of Historic Places on September 13, 1979.

== Description ==
The house was one story, of brick with a steep gable roof, in Federal style including a fanlight over the front door. It was originally rectangular, measuring 26 by 28 feet; before 1919 a frame extension with shiplap siding was added at the rear to create a T shape, and this had a rear porch that was later filled in. The house was one of the last remaining buildings from the early history of Benicia, when the town served as the capital of California from 1853 to 1854, and the brick appears identical to that used to build the state capitol there. The front door and interior wood trim appeared to be later 19th-century additions from lumberyard stock, and wooden millwork decoration was of a style suggesting the 1870s; the house itself had also been thought to date to that decade, because of a 1919 city assessment estimating its age as 40 years. There was a brick cistern under part of the building, and the house had an attic and basement and appeared to have been originally heated by stoves vented into a chimney between rooms.

== History ==
The Carr House was added to the National Register of Historic Places on September 13, 1979, at which time there were plans to restore it. It was demolished by the turn of the millennium.
