= Raymond Carr House =

United States historic place in Kingman, Arizona

- U.S. National Register of Historic Places
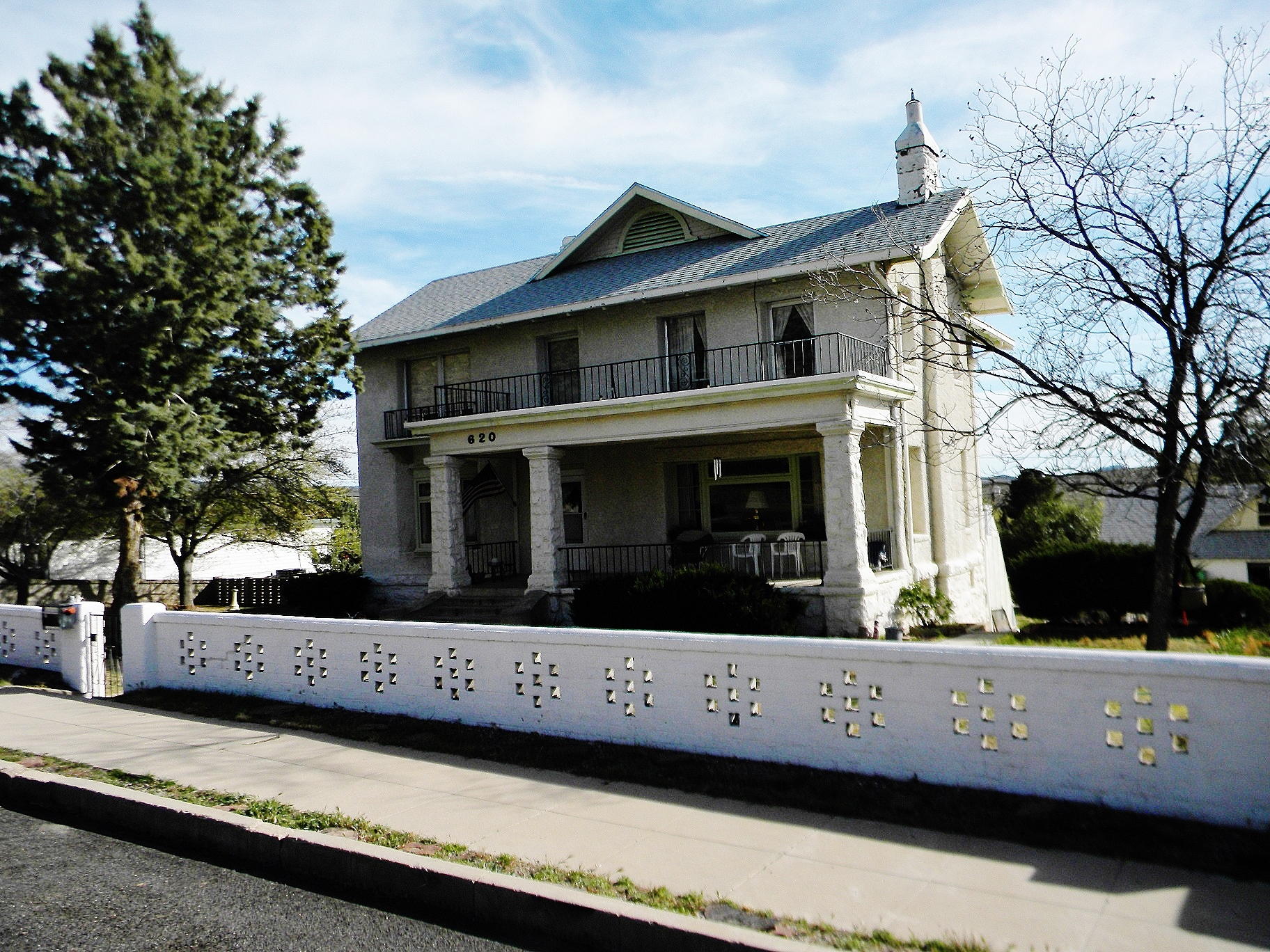

- Location within Arizona Location within the United States
- Location: 620 East Oak Street; Kingman, Arizona
- Coordinates: 35°11′22″N 114°2′50″W
- Built: 1916
- Architect: Brown, B. Allen; Charleton, H.W. & Co.
- Architectural style: Colonial Revival
- MPS: Kingman MRA
- NRHP reference No.: 86001118
- Added to NRHP: May 14, 1986

The Raymond Carr House is a Colonial Revival style house located in Kingman, Arizona. The house is listed on the National Register of Historic Places. It was evaluated for National Register listing as part of a 1985 study of 63 historic resources in Kingman that led to this and many others being listed.

== Description ==
The Raymond Carr House is located at 620 Oak Street in Kingman, Arizona. The home was built in 1916 in the Neo-Colonial Revival style. B. Allen Brown and H. W. Charleton & Co. were the architect and contractor. It has a native stone foundation including the lower wall, and stone came from A. H. Smith Quarry. The two story adobe home is one of the largest homes built in Kingman and was considered an upper class residence. Mr. Carr was one of Mohave County's early pioneers. A livestock rancher, he also co-owned several Kingman businesses, including its second bank, Citizen's Bank, the Kingman Drug Co., and Arizona Stores. His wife, Effie, active in many civic groups, was Worthy Grand Matron of Arizona for the Eastern Star organization. Then house was added to the National Register of Historic Places in 1986. The home is currently occupied by Carol Gordon who purchased it with her deceased husband Wesley Gordon in 1986.
