= Carr's Hall =

- U.S. National Register of Historic Places
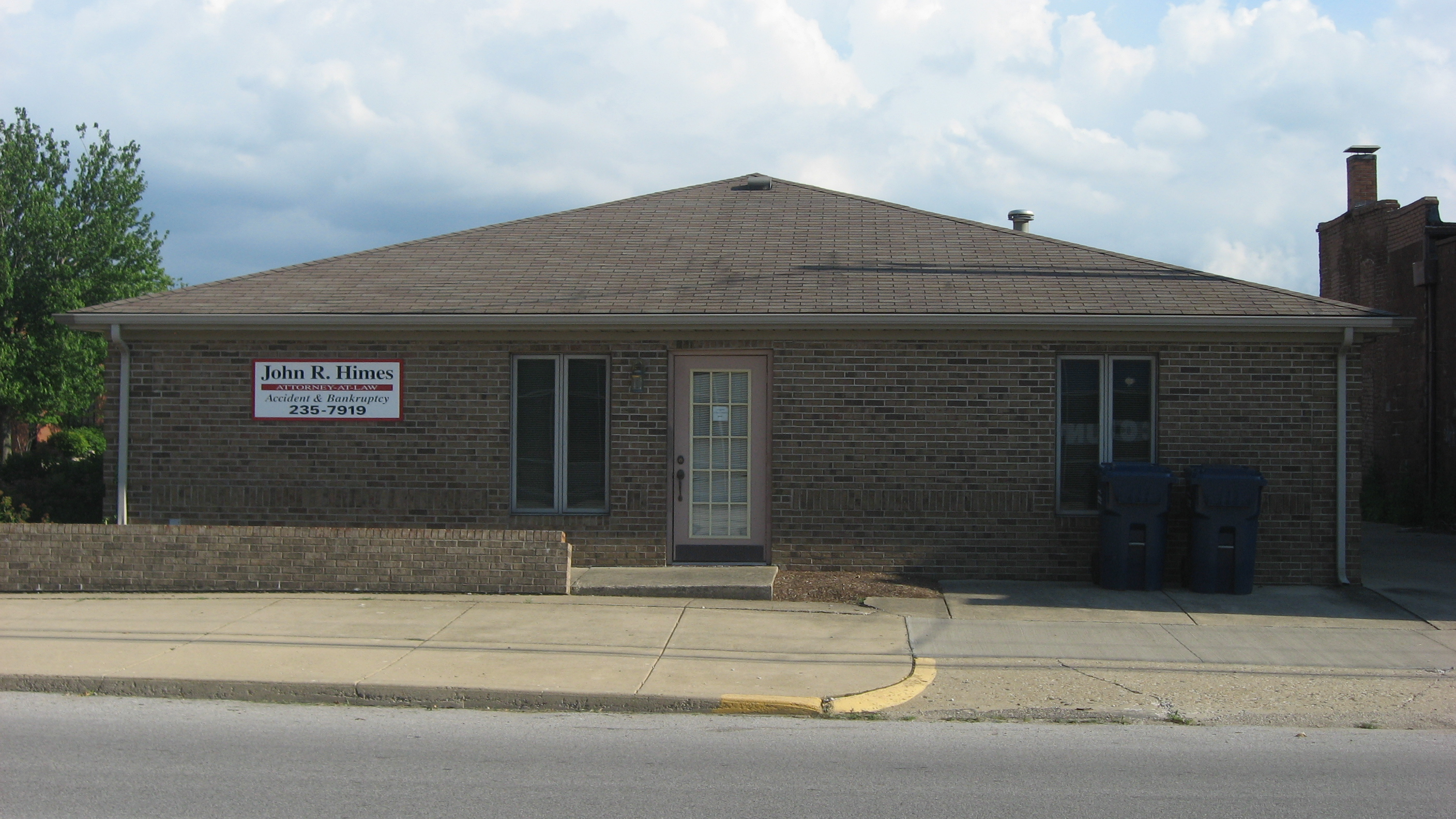
- Site of Carr's Hall, July 2011

- Location within Vigo County, Indiana Location within Indiana Location within the United States
- Location: 329-333 Walnut St., Terre Haute, Indiana
- Coordinates: 39°27′52″N 87°24′46″W
- Area: less than one acre
- Built: 1857
- Built by: Carr, Moses
- Architectural style: Italianate
- MPS: Downtown Terre Haute MRA
- NRHP reference No.: 83000154
- Added to NRHP: June 30, 1983

Carr's Hall was a historic commercial building located at Terre Haute, Indiana. It was built in 1857, and was a two-story, Italianate style brick building. It featured a cast iron storefront on the first story and elaborated pedimented window surrounds on the second. It was one of Terre Haute's oldest buildings. It has been demolished.

It was listed on the National Register of Historic Places in 1983.
