= Anna Carr Homestead =

Historic house in South Dakota, United States

- Carr, Anna, Homestead
- U.S. National Register of Historic Places
- Location within South Dakota Location within the United States
- Location: Off South Dakota Highway 20, Bison, South Dakota
- Coordinates: 45°31′36″N 102°28′10″W
- Area: 1 acre (0.40 ha)
- Built: 1907
- NRHP reference No.: 78002566
- Added to NRHP: January 20, 1978

The Anna Carr Homestead, located off South Dakota Highway 20 in or near Bison, South Dakota, is a historic sod house which was built in 1907. It was listed on the National Register of Historic Places in 1978.

It is a one-story sod house that, when listed, had a wood addition to its rear, from a later date. The original residence is 20 by 15 feet (6.1 m × 4.6 m) in plan and had a flat roof. The sod walls were 7 feet (2.1 m) tall, made of sod strips about 18 inches (46 cm) square and 8 inches (20 cm) high. An addition to the house served as a post office for a time.
