= Fort Pierre Congregational Church =

Historic church in South Dakota, United States

- United Church of Christ, Congregational
- U.S. National Register of Historic Places
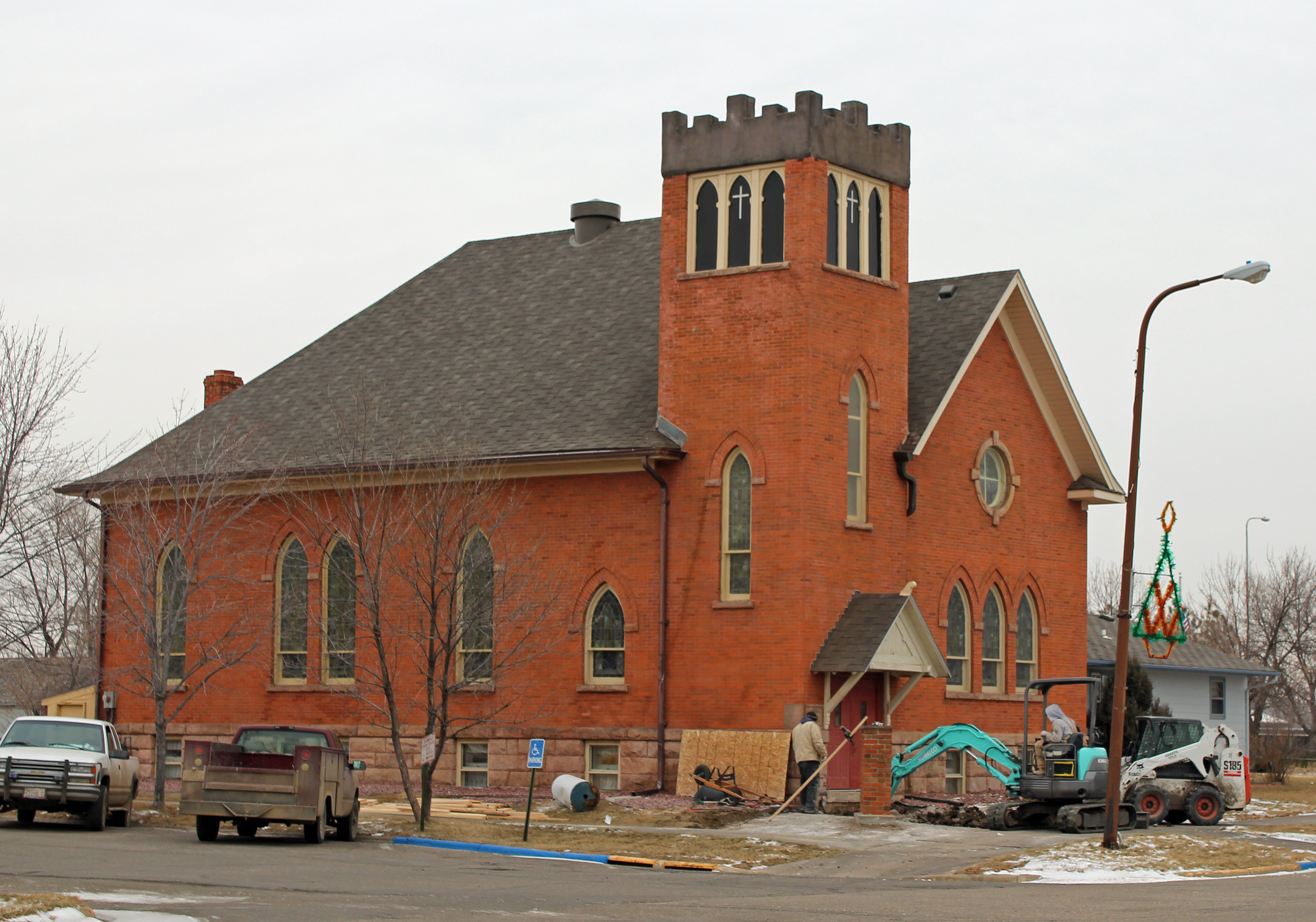

- Location within South Dakota Location within the United States
- Location: 114 W Main Ave, Fort Pierre, South Dakota
- Coordinates: 44°21′13″N 100°22′29″W
- Area: less than one acre
- Built: 1908–09
- Architectural style: High Victorian Gothic
- NRHP reference No.: 77001258
- Added to NRHP: December 21, 1977

The Fort Pierre Congregational Church is a historic church in Fort Pierre, South Dakota. It was built in 1908–09 and was added to the National Register in 1977 as the United Church of Christ, Congregational.

It is a brick church on a sandstone foundation, and has a hipped roof and a square tower. It has fifteen stained glass windows and was built at cost of about $12,000.
