= John Price Carr House =

Historic house in North Carolina, United States

- U.S. National Register of Historic Places
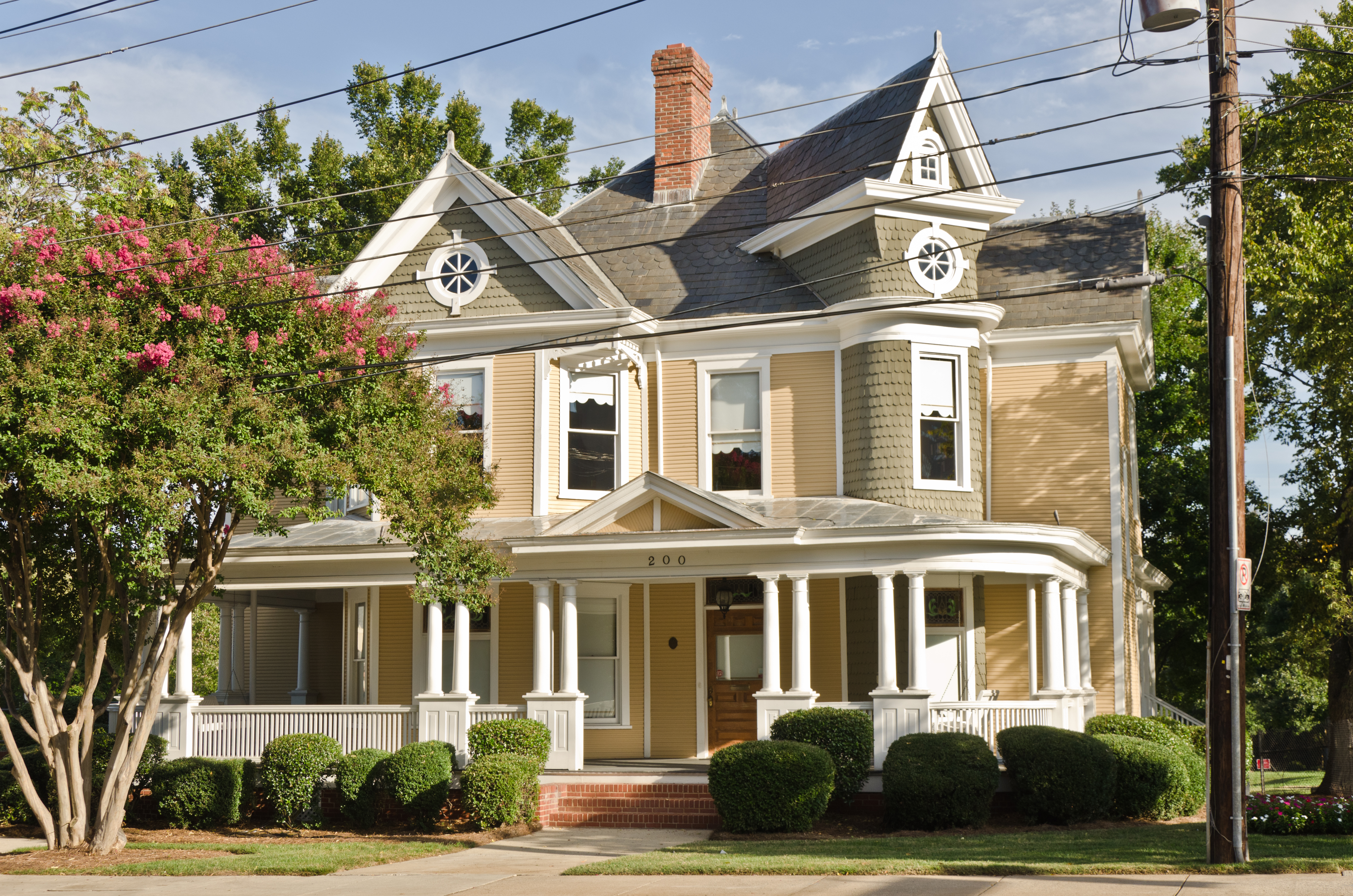
- John Price Carr House, September 2014

- Location within North Carolina Location within the United States
- Location: 200-206 N. McDowell St., Charlotte, North Carolina
- Coordinates: 35°13′16″N 80°50′0″W
- Area: less than one acre
- Built: 1904
- Architectural style: Queen Anne
- NRHP reference No.: 80002885
- Added to NRHP: October 22, 1980

John Price Carr House is a historic home located near Charlotte, Mecklenburg County, North Carolina. It was built in 1904, and is a two-story, Queen Anne style frame dwelling. It has a high hipped roof, four-stage projecting tower, and wraparound porch.

It was listed on the National Register of Historic Places in 1980.
