= William V. Carr House =

Historic house in Iowa, United States

- U.S. National Register of Historic Places
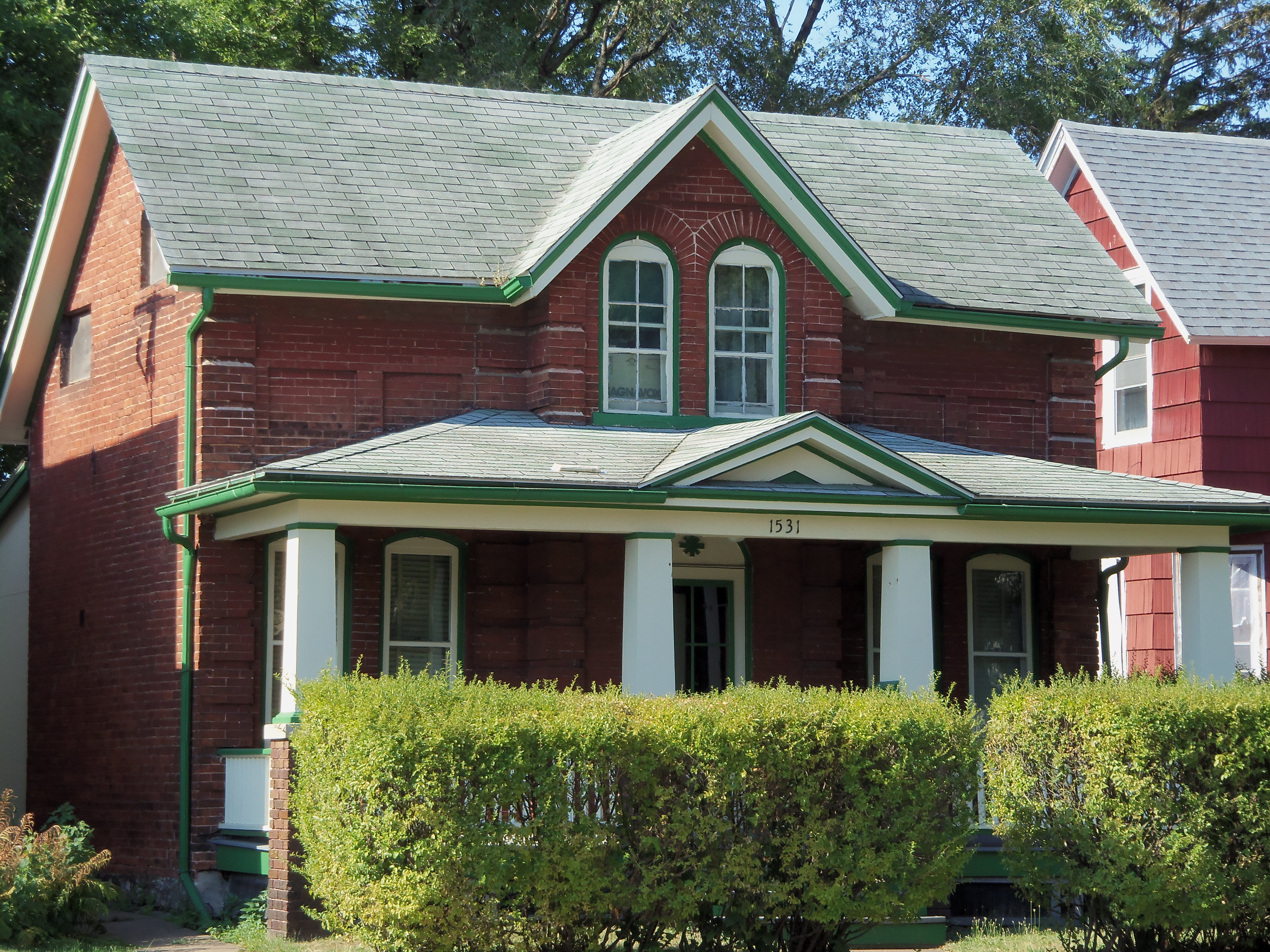

- Location within Iowa Location within the United States
- Location: 1531 W. 3rd St. Davenport, Iowa
- Coordinates: 41°31′20″N 90°35′52″W
- Area: less than one acre
- Built: c. 1860
- Built by: William V. Carr
- Architectural style: Vernacular
- MPS: Davenport MRA
- NRHP reference No.: 83002410
- Added to NRHP: July 7, 1983

The William V. Carr House is a historic building located in the West End of Davenport, Iowa, United States. It was built by William Carr who served as Assistant Street Commissioner, laborer, police officer, and dyer. His house is a noteworthy example of residential architecture from the time of the American Civil War. The main façade of the house has numerous architectural features. There is a projecting front piece with a round-arch entrance and two round-arch windows on the second floor. The main entrance is flanked by side bays that feature two windows with segmental heads. Above the window pairs and above the porch are recessed panels. The ends of the frontispiece and the main block of the house itself feature rusticated quoins. The house was listed on the National Register of Historic Places in 1983.
