= Capa, South Dakota =

Unincorporated community in Jones County, South Dakota, US

Coordinates: 44°06′32″N 100°58′42″W

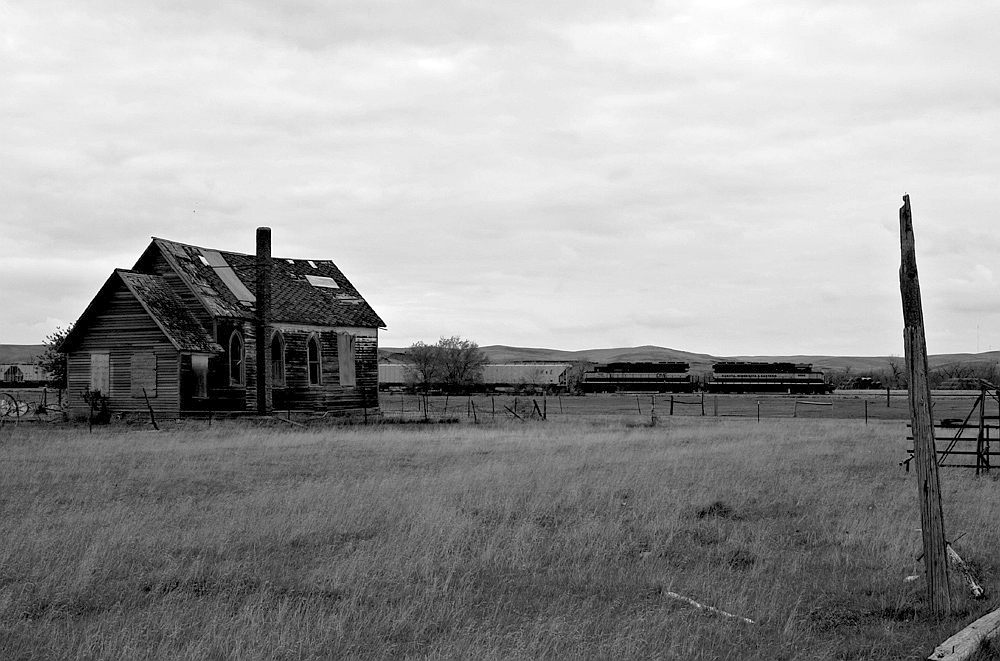
Capa, 2008

Capa is an unincorporated community in Jones County, South Dakota, United States.

== History ==
Capa was laid out in 1908, soon after the railroad was extended into the area. A post office called Capa was established in 1907, and remained in operation until it was discontinued in 1976.

The origin of the city's name is unclear. Some say that "Capa" is taken from the Sioux word for beaver. Another version claims someone noticed that when railroad car doors were opened, the word "capacity" became "capa city" and thus it became the name of the town.

Capa's population reached 300 by the 1950s. A 1960 decision to stop passenger train service in Capa led to a general exodus from the town. Drought and its impact on agricultural contributed to the town's demise. In 2006, Capa had one resident, a descendant of the town's founders, who had acquired ownership of all the town's property over the years.

During the 1920s, the depot, hotel, and public bathhouse made use of geothermal water from a well dug in 1906. A group of local businessmen incorporated as the Capa Hydro Sanitarium in 1922 to promote "the hot medicinal waters of Capa".
