= Jones County, South Dakota =

County in South Dakota, United States

- County
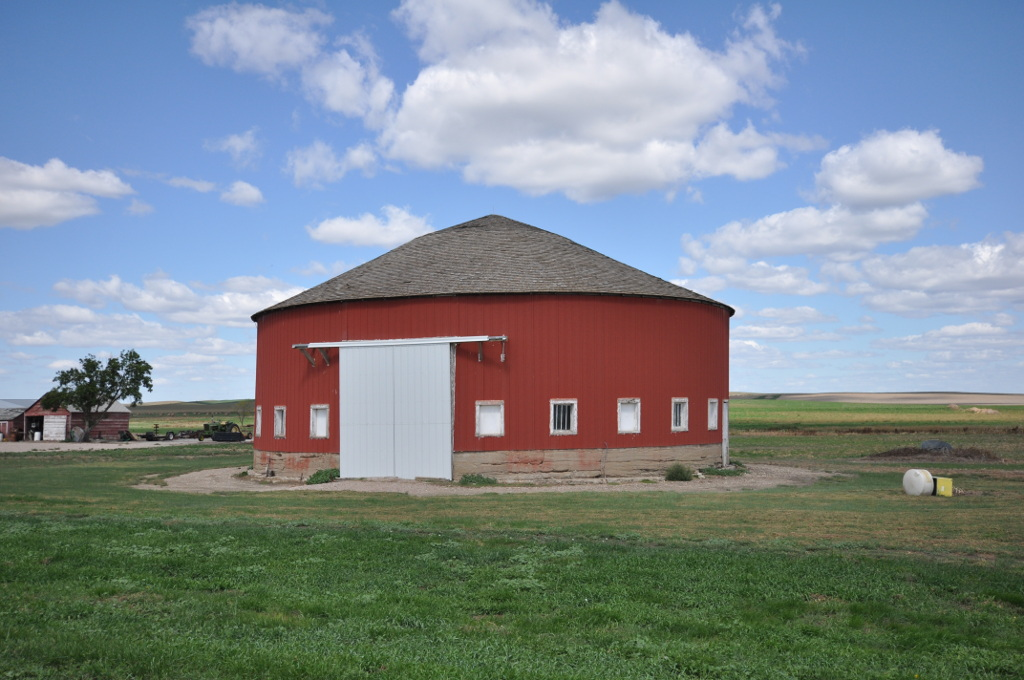
- Freier Round Barn

- Location within the U.S. state of South Dakota
- Coordinates: 43°57′7.168″N 100°41′10.096″W
- Country: United States
- State: South Dakota
- Founded: 1916 (created); January 15, 1917 (organized)
- Named for: George Wallace Jones
- Seat: Murdo
- Largest city: Murdo

Area
  - Total: 970.883 sq mi (2,514.58 km^{2})
  - Land: 969.668 sq mi (2,511.43 km^{2})
  - Water: 1.215 sq mi (3.15 km^{2}) 0.1%

Population (2020)
  - Total: 917
  - Estimate (2025): 913 ▼
  - Density: 0.882/sq mi (0.341/km^{2})
- Time zone: UTC−6 (Central)
  - Summer (DST): UTC−5 (CDT)
- Congressional district: At-large

Jones County is a county in the U.S. state of South Dakota. As of the 2020 census, the population was 917, making it the least populous county in South Dakota. Its county seat is Murdo. Created in 1916 and organized in 1917, it is the most recently established county in South Dakota. It was named after Granville Whittington Jones, an Arkansas-born clergyman/lawyer, who moved to Chamberlain, South Dakota, and became a noted Chautauqua speaker.

== Geography ==
The terrain of Jones County consists of semi-arid rolling hills, partially devoted to agriculture. The Bad River flows north easterly through the northwest corner of the county, and the White River forms the county's southern boundary. The southern areas of the county are carved with gullies and drainages flowing to the White River. The terrain generally slopes to the northeast, and its highest point is on the lower western boundary, at 2,444 ft (745 m) ASL.

According to the United States Census Bureau, the county has a total area of 970.883 square miles (2,514.58 km^{2}), of which 969.668 square miles (2,511.43 km^{2}) is land and 1.215 square miles (3.15 km^{2}) (0.1%) is water.

The eastern portion of South Dakota's counties (48 of 66) observe Central Time; the western counties (18 of 66) observe Mountain Time. Jones County is one of the South Dakota counties to observe Central Time.

=== Major highways ===
- Interstate 90
- U.S. Highway 83

=== Adjacent counties ===
- Stanley County – north
- Lyman County – east
- Mellette County – south
- Jackson County – southwest (observes Mountain Time)
- Haakon County – northwest (observes Mountain Time)

=== Protected area ===
- Buxcel State Game Production Area
- Fort Pierre National Grassland (part)

=== Lakes ===
- Sheriff Reservoir

== Demographics ==
Historical population
Census	Pop.	Note	%±
1920	3,004		—
1930	3,177		5.8%
1940	2,509		−21.0%
1950	2,281		−9.1%
1960	2,066		−9.4%
1970	1,882		−8.9%
1980	1,463		−22.3%
1990	1,324		−9.5%
2000	1,193		−9.9%
2010	1,006		−15.7%
2020	917		−8.8%
2025 (est.)	913	▼	−0.4%
U.S. Decennial Census; 1790–1960 1900–1990; 1990–2000 2010–2020

=== 2020 census ===
As of the 2020 census, the county had a population of 917 people, 399 households, and 245 families; the population density was 0.9 inhabitants per square mile (0.35/km^{2}). Of the residents, 24.6% were under the age of 18 and 23.2% were 65 years of age or older; the median age was 45.2 years. For every 100 females there were 113.3 males, and for every 100 females age 18 and over there were 115.9 males.

The racial makeup of the county was 84.7% White, 0.4% Black or African American, 5.3% American Indian and Alaska Native, 0.0% Asian, 0.2% from some other race, and 9.3% from two or more races. Hispanic or Latino residents of any race comprised 1.2% of the population.

Of the households, 25.8% had children under the age of 18 living with them and 19.8% had a female householder with no spouse or partner present. About 32.6% of all households were made up of individuals and 14.0% had someone living alone who was 65 years of age or older.

There were 504 housing units, of which 20.8% were vacant. Among occupied housing units, 72.2% were owner-occupied and 27.8% were renter-occupied. The homeowner vacancy rate was 0.0% and the rental vacancy rate was 10.5%.

=== 2010 census ===
As of the 2010 census, there were 1,006 people, 458 households, and 280 families in the county. The population density was 1.0 inhabitant per square mile (0.39/km^{2}). There were 589 housing units at an average density of 0.6 units per square mile (0.23 units/km^{2}). The racial makeup of the county was 95.6% white, 2.0% American Indian, 0.4% Pacific islander, 0.1% black or African American, 0.0% from other races, and 1.9% from two or more races. Those of Hispanic or Latino origin made up 1.3% of the population. In terms of ancestry, 48.8% were German, 15.9% were Irish, 10.2% were Norwegian, 9.0% were Dutch, and 1.9% were American.

In terms of ancestry in 2016, 39.1% were of German, 14.3% were of Irish, 13.9% were of Norwegian, 11.4% were of Dutch, 6.4% were of English, 6.2 were of French.

Of the 458 households, 26.6% had children under the age of 18 living with them, 53.7% were married couples living together, 5.2% had a female householder with no husband present, 38.9% were non-families, and 35.8% of all households were made up of individuals. The average household size was 2.20 and the average family size was 2.86. The median age was 46.9 years.

The median income for a household in the county was $49,464 and the median income for a family was $56,589. Males had a median income of $33,021 versus $27,115 for females. The per capita income for the county was $24,630. About 6.6% of families and 9.1% of the population were below the poverty line, including 16.7% of those under age 18 and 8.4% of those age 65 or over.

== Communities ==
=== City ===
- Murdo (county seat)

=== Town ===
- Draper

=== Census-designated place ===
- Okaton

=== Unincorporated community ===
- Capa

=== Townships ===
- Buffalo
- Draper
- Dunkel
- Grandview
- Kolls
- Morga
- Mullen
- Mussman
- Okaton
- Scovil
- South Creek
- Williams Creek
- Zickrick

=== Unorganized territories ===
- Central Jones
- North Jones
- Rich Valley
- Westover

== Politics ==
Jones County voters have been reliably Republican. The last Democrat to carry Jones County in a presidential election was Lyndon Johnson in 1964, and Jimmy Carter in 1976 was the last to top one-third of the county's ballots. Even before the Democratic Party turned towards its modern liberalism, Jones County did not vote for any Democrat except Johnson and Franklin D. Roosevelt in 1932 and 1936—and in the latter election when Roosevelt won 46 of 48 states, he beat Alf Landon in Jones County by just twelve votes.

United States presidential election results for Jones County, South Dakota
Year	Republican		Democratic		Third party(ies)	
Year	No.	%	No.	%	No.	%
1920	609	62.33%	255	26.10%	113	11.57%
1924	732	55.45%	141	10.68%	447	33.86%
1928	857	66.43%	422	32.71%	11	0.85%
1932	472	32.44%	929	63.85%	54	3.71%
1936	608	48.10%	620	49.05%	36	2.85%
1940	832	62.09%	508	37.91%	0	0.00%
1944	465	63.79%	264	36.21%	0	0.00%
1948	522	55.06%	414	43.67%	12	1.27%
1952	739	69.59%	323	30.41%	0	0.00%
1956	601	56.06%	471	43.94%	0	0.00%
1960	644	60.36%	423	39.64%	0	0.00%
1964	415	43.09%	548	56.91%	0	0.00%
1968	562	55.75%	358	35.52%	88	8.73%
1972	642	64.39%	346	34.70%	9	0.90%
1976	515	57.87%	374	42.02%	1	0.11%
1980	689	74.97%	189	20.57%	41	4.46%
1984	689	76.64%	206	22.91%	4	0.44%
1988	521	66.28%	261	33.21%	4	0.51%
1992	454	58.28%	166	21.31%	159	20.41%
1996	463	63.51%	184	25.24%	82	11.25%
2000	509	76.66%	137	20.63%	18	2.71%
2004	565	78.80%	134	18.69%	18	2.51%
2008	463	73.84%	147	23.44%	17	2.71%
2012	490	80.46%	108	17.73%	11	1.81%
2016	450	80.65%	69	12.37%	39	6.99%
2020	498	83.14%	90	15.03%	11	1.84%
2024	477	86.73%	60	10.91%	13	2.36%

== See also ==
- National Register of Historic Places listings in Jones County, South Dakota
