= Draper, South Dakota =

- Town
- Location in Jones County and the state of South Dakota
- Coordinates: 43°55′34″N 100°32′14″W
- Country: United States
- State: South Dakota
- County: Jones
- Incorporated: 1910

Area
  - Total: 0.65 sq mi (1.68 km^{2})
  - Land: 0.65 sq mi (1.68 km^{2})
  - Water: 0 sq mi (0.00 km^{2})
- Elevation: 2,238 ft (682 m)

Population (2020)
  - Total: 46
  - Density: 70.8/sq mi (27.33/km^{2})
- Time zone: UTC-6 (Central (CST))
  - Summer (DST): UTC-5 (CDT)
- ZIP code: 57531
- Area code: 605
- FIPS code: 46-17020
- GNIS feature ID: 1267357

Draper is a town in Jones County, South Dakota, United States. The population was 46 at the 2020 census.

Draper was laid out in 1906, and named in honor of C. A. Draper, a railroad official.

== Geography ==
According to the United States Census Bureau, the town has a total area of 0.65 square miles (1.68 km^{2}), all land.

== Demographics ==
Historical population
Census	Pop.	Note	%±
1910	211		—
1920	173		−18.0%
1930	169		−2.3%
1940	190		12.4%
1950	252		32.6%
1960	215		−14.7%
1970	200		−7.0%
1980	138		−31.0%
1990	123		−10.9%
2000	92		−25.2%
2010	82		−10.9%
2020	46		−43.9%
U.S. Decennial Census; 2012 Estimate

=== 2010 census ===
As of the census of 2010, there were 82 people, 37 households, and 25 families residing in the town. The population density was 126.2 inhabitants per square mile (48.7/km^{2}). There were 48 housing units at an average density of 73.8 per square mile (28.5/km^{2}). The racial makeup of the town was 98.8% White and 1.2% from two or more races.

There were 37 households, of which 29.7% had children under the age of 18 living with them, 64.9% were married couples living together, 2.7% had a female householder with no husband present, and 32.4% were non-families. 24.3% of all households were made up of individuals, and 8.1% had someone living alone who was 65 years of age or older. The average household size was 2.22 and the average family size was 2.68.

The median age in the town was 50.7 years. 19.5% of residents were under the age of 18; 3.8% were between the ages of 18 and 24; 18.3% were from 25 to 44; 31.7% were from 45 to 64; and 26.8% were 65 years of age or older. The gender makeup of the town was 51.2% male and 48.8% female.

=== 2000 census ===
As of the census of 2000, there were 92 people, 41 households, and 23 families residing in the town. The population density was 142.9 inhabitants per square mile (55.2/km^{2}). There were 57 housing units at an average density of 88.5 per square mile (34.2/km^{2}). The racial makeup of the town was 100.00% White.

There were 41 households, out of which 29.3% had children under the age of 18 living with them, 53.7% were married couples living together, 4.9% had a female householder with no husband present, and 41.5% were non-families. 36.6% of all households were made up of individuals, and 14.6% had someone living alone who was 65 years of age or older. The average household size was 2.24 and the average family size was 3.00.

In the town, the population was spread out, with 28.3% under the age of 18, 1.1% from 18 to 24, 29.3% from 25 to 44, 21.7% from 45 to 64, and 19.6% who were 65 years of age or older. The median age was 41 years. For every 100 females, there were 119.0 males. For every 100 females age 18 and over, there were 127.6 males.

The median income for a household in the town was $26,000, and the median income for a family was $26,250. Males had a median income of $22,083 versus $16,667 for females. The per capita income for the town was $13,621. There were 16.7% of families and 21.2% of the population living below the poverty line, including 42.9% of under eighteens and none of those over 64.
