= Bad River (South Dakota) =

River in central South Dakota

Coordinates: 44.35440°N 100.36790°W

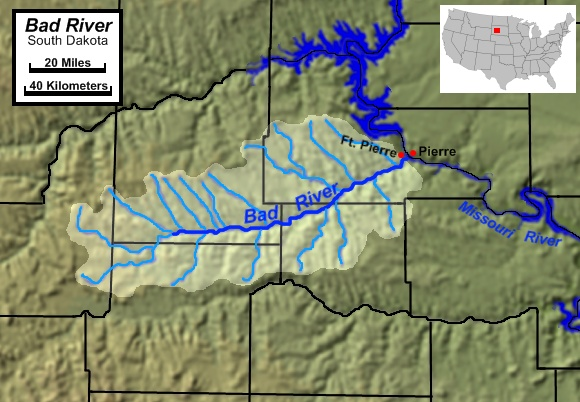
Course and watershed of the Bad River

The Bad River (Lakota: wakpá-šiča; "river-bad") is a tributary of the Missouri River, approximately 161 miles (259 km) long, in central South Dakota in the United States. The river is formed at Philip, South Dakota, by the confluence of its North and South forks. The North Fork Bad River rises in eastern Pennington County and flows 51 miles (82 km) east-southeast to Philip, while the South Fork Bad River rises at the confluence of Whitewater Creek and Big Buffalo Creek in Jackson County, within the Buffalo Gap National Grassland, and flows 36 miles (58 km) northeast to Philip. The main stem of the Bad River flows east-northeast from Philip, passing Midland and Capa. It joins the Missouri at Fort Pierre. The Bad drainage basin is about 3,000 square miles (7,800 km^{2}) and is located south of the Cheyenne River in the Pierre Hills and Southern Plateaus.

The river basin is noted for deposits of manganese and fuller's earth. At the river mouth near Fort Pierre, the Bad River flood stage contains large quantities of silt. The Bad carries hard water of generally poor quality.

The name recalls an incident around the spring of 1738 when a flash flood on the Bad River inundated the camp of a north-traveling band, causing a large loss of life, including all their horses. The Bad River was called the Teton River by Lewis & Clark in 1804 as the place where they parlayed with Teton Lakota, but the name did not catch. At Fort Pierre, the river has a mean annual discharge of 176 cubic feet per second (5.0 cubic metres per second).

== Industrial use ==
As of November 2019, TC Energy was applying for permits in the state to tap the Bad River to use water for the construction of Phase 4 of the Keystone pipeline, including camp construction to house transient construction workers.

== See also ==
- List of rivers of South Dakota
