= Stanley County, South Dakota =

County in South Dakota, United States

- County
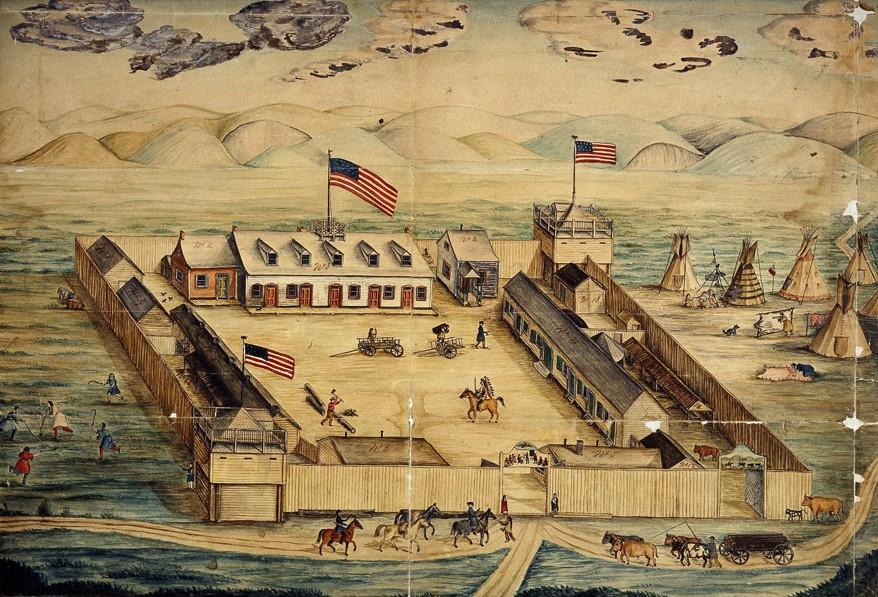
- Watercolor drawing of Fort Pierre Chouteau. Dated 1854.

- Location within the U.S. state of South Dakota
- Coordinates: 44°24′N 100°45′W
- Country: United States
- State: South Dakota
- Created: 1873
- Organized: 1890
- Named for: David S. Stanley
- Seat: Fort Pierre
- Largest city: Fort Pierre

Area
  - Total: 1,517 sq mi (3,930 km^{2})
  - Land: 1,444 sq mi (3,740 km^{2})
  - Water: 73 sq mi (190 km^{2}) 4.8%

Population (2020)
  - Total: 2,980
  - Estimate (2025): 3,018 ▲
  - Density: 2.06/sq mi (0.797/km^{2})

Time zones
- western portion: UTC−7 (Mountain)
  - Summer (DST): UTC−6 (MDT)
- eastern portion: UTC−6 (Central)
  - Summer (DST): UTC−5 (CDT)
- Congressional district: At-large
- Website: stanleycountysd.gov

Stanley County is a county in the U.S. state of South Dakota. As of the 2020 census, the population was 2,980. Its county seat is Fort Pierre. The county was created in 1873, and was organized in 1890. It is named for David S. Stanley, a commander at Fort Sully from 1866 to 1874, which was located nearby.

Stanley County is included in the Pierre, SD Micropolitan Statistical Area.

== Geography ==
Stanley County's northwestern boundary is defined by the Cheyenne River which flows eastward, to discharge into the Missouri River at the most northerly point of Stanley County. From there, the county's northeast boundary is defined by the southeastward-flowing Missouri. The county terrain consists of semi-arid rolling hills, carved by drainages. The area is partially devoted to agriculture. The terrain slopes to the east; its highest point is in the SW county corner, at 2,198 ft (670 m) ASL. The county has a total area of 1,517 square miles (3,930 km^{2}), of which 1,444 square miles (3,740 km^{2}) is land and 73 square miles (190 km^{2}) (4.8%) is water.

The eastern portion of South Dakota's counties (48 of 66) observe Central Time; the western counties (18 of 66) observe Mountain Time. Stanley County is on the western end of counties which observe Central Time, and its residents are split east–west in their time observance. Although Fort Pierre, the seat of Stanley County, is located in the Mountain Time Zone, most residents of the city use Central Time because of close social and economic ties with Pierre, which is located in the Central Time Zone.

=== Major highways ===
- U.S. Highway 14
- U.S. Highway 83
- South Dakota Highway 34
- South Dakota Highway 63
- South Dakota Highway 1806

=== Adjacent counties ===
- Dewey County – north
- Sully County – northeast
- Hughes County – east
- Lyman County – southeast
- Jones County – south
- Haakon County – west
- Ziebach County – northwest

=== Protected areas ===
- Antelope Creek State Game Production Area
- Antelope Creek State Lakeside Use Area
- Brush Creek State Game Production Area
- Chantier Creek State Game Production Area
- Chantier Creek State Lakeside Use Area
- Fort George State Game Production Area
- Fort Pierre National Grassland (part)
- Foster Bay State Lakeside Use Area
- Frozen Man Creek State Game Production Area
- Hayes Lake State Game Production Area
- Minneconjou State Game Production Area
- Minneconjou State Lakeside Use Area
- Oahe Downstream State Recreation Area
- Schomer Draw State Game Production Area
- West Shore State Lakeside Use Area

=== Lakes ===
- Lake Oahe (part)
- Lake Sharpe (part)

== Demographics ==
Historical population
Census	Pop.	Note	%±
1880	793		—
1890	1,028		29.6%
1900	1,341		30.4%
1910	14,975		1,016.7%
1920	2,908		−80.6%
1930	2,381		−18.1%
1940	1,959		−17.7%
1950	2,055		4.9%
1960	4,085		98.8%
1970	2,457		−39.9%
1980	2,533		3.1%
1990	2,453		−3.2%
2000	2,772		13.0%
2010	2,966		7.0%
2020	2,980		0.5%
2025 (est.)	3,018	▲	1.3%
U.S. Decennial Census; 1790–1960 1900–1990; 1990–2000 2010–2020

=== 2020 census ===
As of the 2020 census, there were 2,980 people, 1,244 households, and 823 families residing in the county. Of the residents, 24.7% were under the age of 18 and 20.8% were 65 years of age or older; the median age was 42.6 years. For every 100 females there were 98.9 males, and for every 100 females age 18 and over there were 95.6 males. The population density was 2.1 inhabitants per square mile (0.81/km^{2}). The racial makeup of the county was 86.2% White, 0.4% Black or African American, 6.5% American Indian and Alaska Native, 0.3% Asian, 0.3% from some other race, and 6.0% from two or more races. Hispanic or Latino residents of any race comprised 1.0% of the population. There were 1,244 households in the county, of which 30.0% had children under the age of 18 living with them and 22.6% had a female householder with no spouse or partner present. About 28.5% of all households were made up of individuals and 11.9% had someone living alone who was 65 years of age or older. There were 1,427 housing units, of which 12.8% were vacant. Among occupied housing units, 79.7% were owner-occupied and 20.3% were renter-occupied. The homeowner vacancy rate was 2.2% and the rental vacancy rate was 8.5%.

=== 2010 census ===
As of the 2010 census, there were 2,966 people, 1,228 households, and 857 families in the county. The population density was 2.1 inhabitants per square mile (0.81/km^{2}). There were 1,387 housing units at an average density of 1.0 per square mile (0.39/km^{2}). The racial makeup of the county was 90.0% white, 6.6% American Indian, 0.3% black or African American, 0.1% Asian, 0.2% from other races, and 2.8% from two or more races. Those of Hispanic or Latino origin made up 0.7% of the population. In terms of ancestry, 46.4% were German, 12.5% were Irish, 10.8% were English, 10.7% were Norwegian, 8.4% were Czech, 5.0% were Swedish, and 2.5% were American.

Of the 1,228 households, 30.8% had children under the age of 18 living with them, 56.7% were married couples living together, 8.5% had a female householder with no husband present, 30.2% were non-families, and 26.2% of all households were made up of individuals. The average household size was 2.42 and the average family size was 2.87. The median age was 41.9 years.

The median income for a household in the county was $51,875 and the median income for a family was $54,722. Males had a median income of $33,929 versus $25,574 for females. The per capita income for the county was $27,435. About 8.8% of families and 11.9% of the population were below the poverty line, including 18.1% of those under age 18 and 17.3% of those age 65 or over.

== Communities ==
=== City ===
- Fort Pierre (county seat)

=== Unincorporated communities ===
- Hayes
- Mission Ridge
- Sansarc
- Wendte

=== Unorganized territories ===
Stanley County has no townships. It is divided into three areas of unorganized territory: Lower Brule, North Stanley, and South Stanley.

== Education ==
There is one school district in the county: Stanley County School District 57-1.

== In popular culture ==
The Triple U Buffalo Ranch in northern Stanley County was used in filming the 1990 movie Dances with Wolves.

== Notable person ==
- Casey Tibbs (1929–1990): cowboy, rodeo performer, and actor

== Politics ==
Stanley County have traditionally voted Republican. No Democratic presidential candidate has won Stanley County since Lyndon Johnson in 1964, whilst Michael Dukakis during the drought-affected 1988 election is the last Democrat to top forty percent.

United States presidential election results for Stanley County, South Dakota
Year	Republican		Democratic		Third party(ies)	
Year	No.	%	No.	%	No.	%
1892	76	49.03%	29	18.71%	50	32.26%
1896	89	38.53%	140	60.61%	2	0.87%
1900	254	49.51%	252	49.12%	7	1.36%
1904	547	56.74%	396	41.08%	21	2.18%
1908	2,313	56.52%	1,598	39.05%	181	4.42%
1912	0	0.00%	1,051	47.45%	1,164	52.55%
1916	254	38.25%	381	57.38%	29	4.37%
1920	598	56.79%	394	37.42%	61	5.79%
1924	531	43.81%	249	20.54%	432	35.64%
1928	739	62.42%	437	36.91%	8	0.68%
1932	553	41.39%	757	56.66%	26	1.95%
1936	495	42.09%	629	53.49%	52	4.42%
1940	679	55.66%	541	44.34%	0	0.00%
1944	384	62.14%	234	37.86%	0	0.00%
1948	522	58.85%	359	40.47%	6	0.68%
1952	695	70.63%	289	29.37%	0	0.00%
1956	587	50.87%	567	49.13%	0	0.00%
1960	678	48.15%	730	51.85%	0	0.00%
1964	549	42.26%	750	57.74%	0	0.00%
1968	572	51.58%	439	39.59%	98	8.84%
1972	779	60.95%	492	38.50%	7	0.55%
1976	637	53.57%	548	46.09%	4	0.34%
1980	892	68.67%	339	26.10%	68	5.23%
1984	942	72.52%	351	27.02%	6	0.46%
1988	698	57.26%	511	41.92%	10	0.82%
1992	719	51.39%	427	30.52%	253	18.08%
1996	795	57.53%	454	32.85%	133	9.62%
2000	955	69.15%	402	29.11%	24	1.74%
2004	1,129	69.56%	464	28.59%	30	1.85%
2008	1,017	65.49%	510	32.84%	26	1.67%
2012	1,063	69.03%	435	28.25%	42	2.73%
2016	1,148	73.26%	329	21.00%	90	5.74%
2020	1,203	72.82%	421	25.48%	28	1.69%
2024	1,260	72.62%	447	25.76%	28	1.61%

== See also ==
- National Register of Historic Places listings in Stanley County, South Dakota
