= Fort Pierre, South Dakota =

Fort Pierre
- City
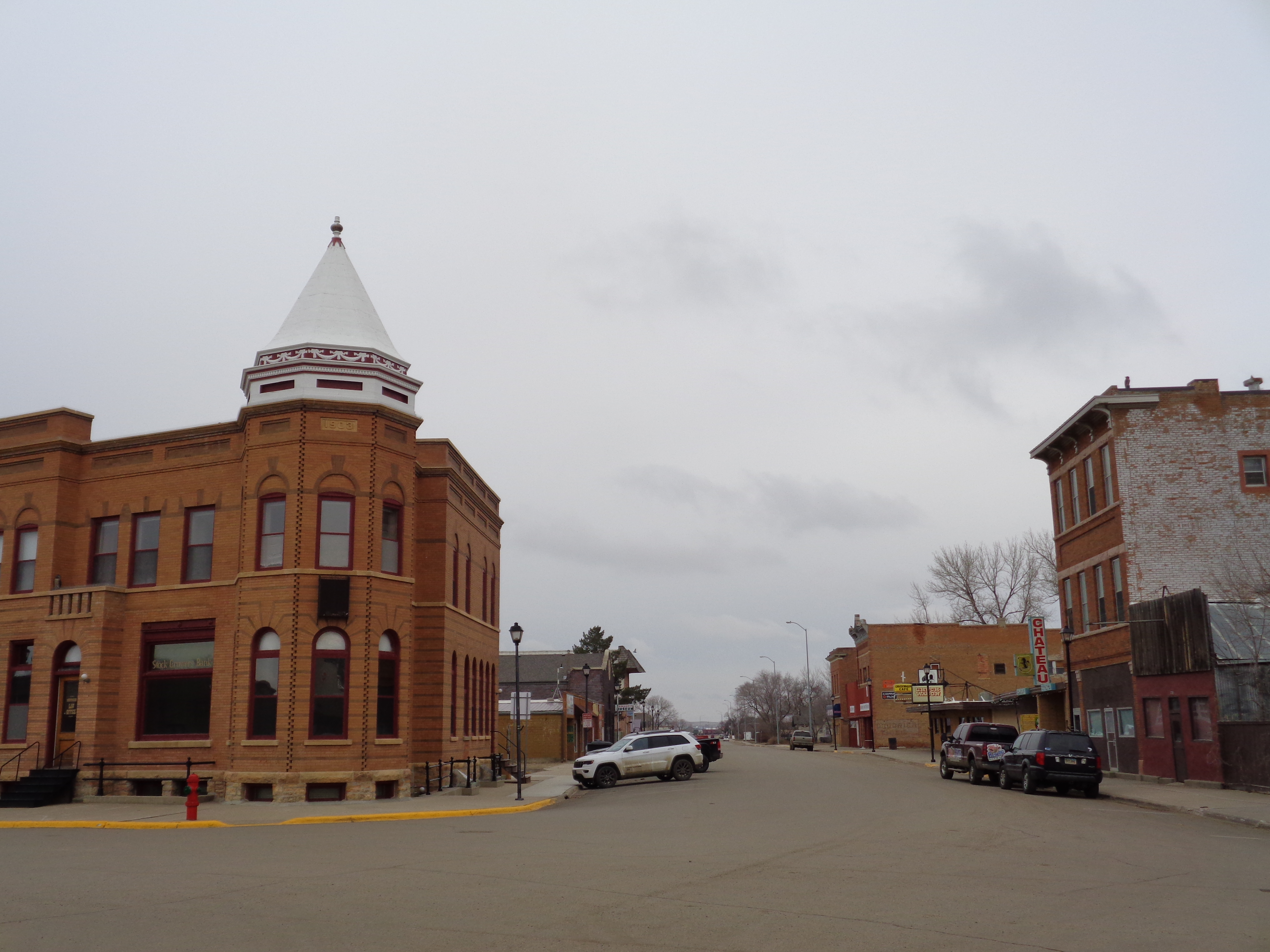
- Main and Deadwood streets in Fort Pierre, South Dakota
- Motto: "Where The West Begins"
- Location in Stanley County and the state of South Dakota

- Location in the United States
- Coordinates: 44°22′04″N 100°22′59″W
- Country: United States
- State: South Dakota
- County: Stanley
- Founded: 1867
- Incorporated: June 2, 1890

Government
  - Mayor: Gloria Hanson

Area
  - Total: 3.17 sq mi (8.20 km^{2})
  - Land: 3.12 sq mi (8.08 km^{2})
  - Water: 0.046 sq mi (0.12 km^{2})
- Elevation: 1,440 ft (439 m)

Population (2020)
  - Total: 2,115
  - Estimate (2022): 2,142
  - Density: 678.2/sq mi (261.84/km^{2})
- Time zone: UTC–7 (Mountain (MST))
  - Summer (DST): UTC–6 (MDT)
- ZIP code: 57532
- Area code: 605
- FIPS code: 46-22260
- GNIS feature ID: 1267393
- Website: fortpierre.com

Fort Pierre is a city in Stanley County, South Dakota, United States. It is part of the Pierre, South Dakota micropolitan area and the county seat of Stanley County. The population was 2,115 at the 2020 census.

The settlement of Fort Pierre developed around an 1832 fort situated on the west bank of the Missouri River, near the confluence with its tributary Bad River. Earlier European exploration was by the French beginning in the early 1700s. An American-owned trading post had been operating near what became the fort since 1817, and in 2017 the city celebrated its bicentennial of continuous permanent settlement.

== History ==
On March 30, 1743, Francois and Louis-Joseph Gaultier de La Vérendrye reached the area of present-day Fort Pierre during an expedition west from Quebec, a French colony in present-day Canada. They left a lead plate buried in a hill in what is now the city to claim the land for the King of France. In the 1803 Louisiana Purchase, the United States acquired this area and the remainder of France's vast territory west of the Mississippi River.

President Thomas Jefferson commissioned the Lewis and Clark Corps of Discovery Expedition in 1804 to explore the territory, especially by traveling west to the Upper Missouri and Platte rivers, in the hope of finding a water route to the Pacific Ocean. They met with the Teton Sioux on the south side of the mouth of the Bad River on September 24–28, 1804.

In 1817 fur trader Joseph La Framboise, Jr., an agent for the American Fur Company, established Fort Tecumseh a mile to the north, on what is now La Framboise Island in the Missouri River. The fur trade was highly lucrative and attracted competitors. In 1832, Pierre Chouteau, Jr., a major fur trader from St Louis, replaced that early facility with Fort Pierre Chouteau, a trading post and fort on the west side of the Missouri and north side of the Bad River's mouth in what is now the city.

The city of Fort Pierre gradually developed around the trading post. Fort Pierre celebrated its Bicentennial in 2017, marking 200 years of continuous permanent settlement at the confluence of the Missouri and Bad rivers.

In 1880, the settlement of Pierre was founded on the east side of the Missouri River in Hughes County. Because it was centrally located and reached first by the railroad, it was designated by the state legislature as the state capital when South Dakota was admitted as a state.

== Geography ==
Across the Missouri River from Fort Pierre is the state capital of South Dakota, Pierre.

According to the United States Census Bureau, the city has a total area of 3.16 square miles (8.18 km^{2}), of which 3.11 square miles (8.05 km^{2}) is land and 0.05 square miles (0.13 km^{2}) is water.

Although Fort Pierre is located in the Mountain Time Zone, most residents of the city use Central Time because of close social and economic ties with Pierre, which is located in the Central Time Zone.

== Demographics ==
Historical population
Census	Pop.	Note	%±
1880	287		—
1890	360		25.4%
1900	395		9.7%
1910	792		100.5%
1920	805		1.6%
1930	683		−15.2%
1940	764		11.9%
1950	951		24.5%
1960	2,649		178.5%
1970	1,448		−45.3%
1980	1,789		23.5%
1990	1,854		3.6%
2000	1,991		7.4%
2010	2,078		4.4%
2020	2,115		1.8%
2022 (est.)	2,142		1.3%
U.S. Decennial Census; 2020 Census

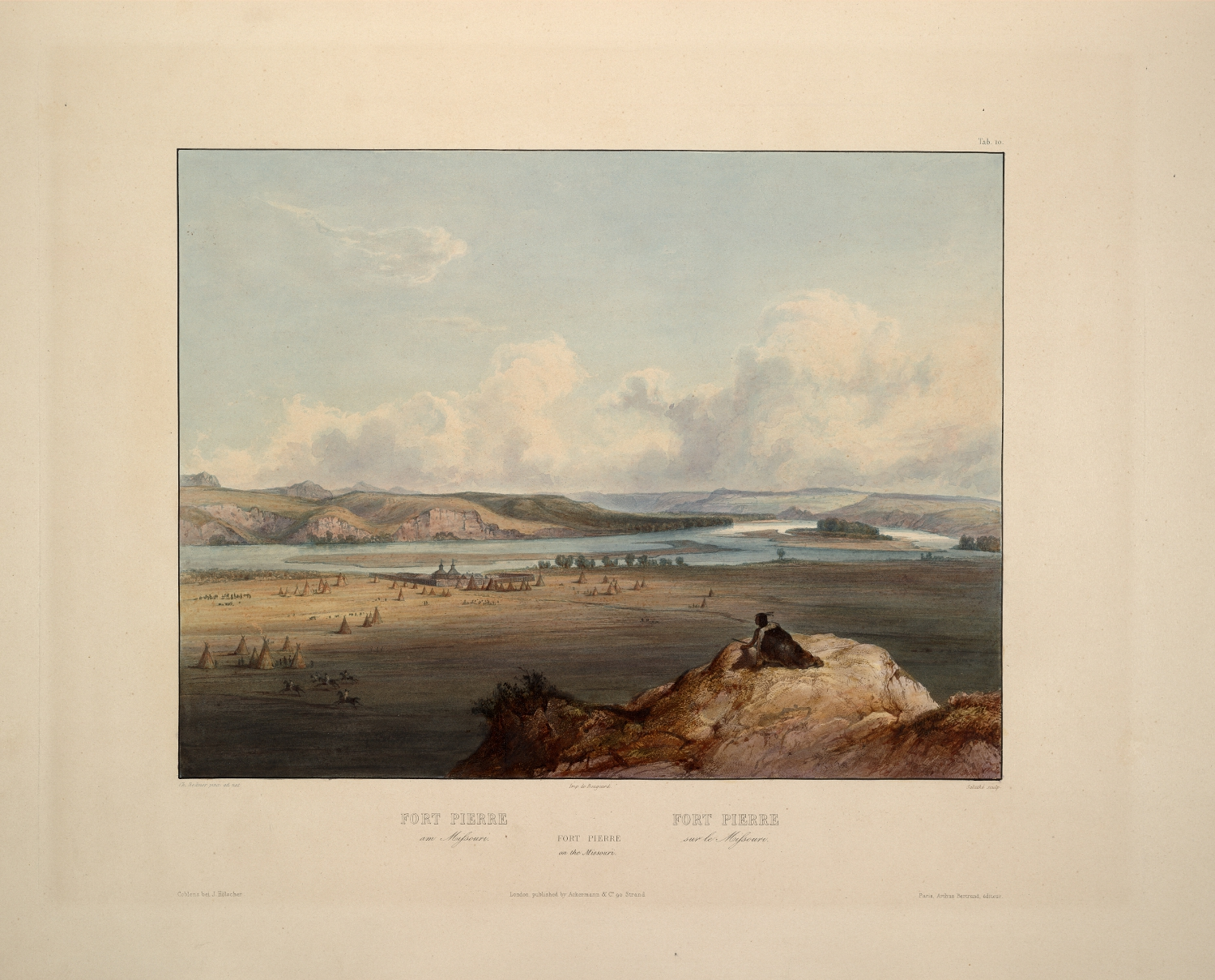
Fort Pierre and the adjacent prairie circa 1833. Fort Pierre on the Missouri: aquatint by Karl Bodmer from the book Maximilian, Prince of Wied’s Travels in the Interior of North America, during the years 1832–1834

=== 2020 census ===
As of the 2020 census, Fort Pierre had a population of 2,115. The median age was 42.9 years. 24.3% of residents were under the age of 18 and 21.3% of residents were 65 years of age or older.

For every 100 females there were 100.1 males, and for every 100 females age 18 and over there were 94.2 males age 18 and over.

98.6% of residents lived in urban areas, while 1.4% lived in rural areas.

There were 907 households in Fort Pierre, of which 28.6% had children under the age of 18 living in them. Of all households, 49.3% were married-couple households, 18.9% were households with a male householder and no spouse or partner present, and 25.0% were households with a female householder and no spouse or partner present. About 31.6% of all households were made up of individuals and 13.1% had someone living alone who was 65 years of age or older.

There were 1,006 housing units, of which 9.8% were vacant. The homeowner vacancy rate was 1.5% and the rental vacancy rate was 10.3%.

Racial composition as of the 2020 census
Race	Number	Percent
White	1,824	86.2%
Black or African American	10	0.5%
American Indian and Alaska Native	145	6.9%
Asian	3	0.1%
Native Hawaiian and Other Pacific Islander	8	0.4%
Some other race	1	0.0%
Two or more races	124	5.9%
Hispanic or Latino (of any race)	15	0.7%

=== 2010 census ===
As of the census of 2010, there were 2,078 people, 893 households, and 586 families living in the city. The population density was 668.2 inhabitants per square mile (258.0/km^{2}). There were 959 housing units at an average density of 308.4 per square mile (119.1/km^{2}). The racial makeup of the city was 89.4% White, 0.3% African American, 6.6% Native American, 0.2% Asian, 0.2% from other races, and 3.3% from two or more races. Hispanic or Latino of any race were 0.7% of the population.

There were 893 households, of which 30.5% had children under the age of 18 living with them, 51.6% were married couples living together, 9.7% had a female householder with no husband present, 4.3% had a male householder with no wife present, and 34.4% were non-families. 30.6% of all households were made up of individuals, and 11.2% had someone living alone who was 65 years of age or older. The average household size was 2.33 and the average family size was 2.86.

The median age in the city was 41.8 years. 24.1% of residents were under the age of 18; 6.6% were between the ages of 18 and 24; 23.2% were from 25 to 44; 30% were from 45 to 64; and 16% were 65 years of age or older. The gender makeup of the city was 49.4% male and 50.6% female.

=== 2000 census ===
As of the census of 2000, there were 1,991 people, 810 households, and 538 families living in the city. The population density was 686.6 inhabitants per square mile (265.1/km^{2}). There were 875 housing units at an average density of 301.8 per square mile (116.5/km^{2}). The racial makeup of the city was 92.16% White, 0.20% African American, 5.22% Native American, 0.30% Asian, 0.15% from other races, and 1.96% from two or more races. Hispanic or Latino of any race were 0.40% of the population.

There were 810 households, out of which 34.3% had children under the age of 18 living with them, 51.4% were married couples living together, 10.9% had a female householder with no husband present, and 33.5% were non-families. 28.4% of all households were made up of individuals, and 8.9% had someone living alone who was 65 years of age or older. The average household size was 2.45 and the average family size was 3.01.

In the city, the population was spread out, with 28.0% under the age of 18, 6.9% from 18 to 24, 28.3% from 25 to 44, 25.4% from 45 to 64, and 11.3% who were 65 years of age or older. The median age was 37 years. For every 100 females, there were 99.9 males. For every 100 females age 18 and over, there were 95.8 males.

As of 2000 the median income for a household in the city was $41,181, and the median income for a family was $47,885. Males had a median income of $29,948 versus $21,208 for females. The per capita income for the city was $20,478. About 7.4% of families and 8.9% of the population were below the poverty line, including 12.2% of those under age 18 and 14.8% of those age 65 or over.

== Climate ==
The data here are for a weather station 17 miles west-southwest of Fort Pierre, near Wendte. Fort Pierre's reading of 120 °F is tied for the highest temperature recorded in the state of South Dakota (the other occurrence of 120 °F was at Gann Valley in 1934).

Climate data for Fort Pierre, SD
Month	Jan	Feb	Mar	Apr	May	Jun	Jul	Aug	Sep	Oct	Nov	Dec	Year
Record high °F (°C)	75 (24)	76 (24)	88 (31)	99 (37)	105 (41)	111 (44)	120 (49)	111 (44)	110 (43)	101 (38)	87 (31)	75 (24)	120 (49)
Mean daily maximum °F (°C)	33.5 (0.8)	38.6 (3.7)	49.9 (9.9)	62.5 (16.9)	72.8 (22.7)	82.5 (28.1)	90.3 (32.4)	90.1 (32.3)	80.6 (27.0)	64.4 (18.0)	47.7 (8.7)	35.0 (1.7)	62.3 (16.8)
Mean daily minimum °F (°C)	8.2 (−13.2)	12.8 (−10.7)	23.2 (−4.9)	34.1 (1.2)	45.2 (7.3)	55.5 (13.1)	61.5 (16.4)	59.4 (15.2)	48.5 (9.2)	35.0 (1.7)	21.3 (−5.9)	10.7 (−11.8)	34.6 (1.5)
Record low °F (°C)	−44 (−42)	−47 (−44)	−26 (−32)	2 (−17)	19 (−7)	32 (0)	43 (6)	37 (3)	18 (−8)	−3 (−19)	−16 (−27)	−40 (−40)	−47 (−44)
Average precipitation inches (mm)	0.34 (8.6)	0.51 (13)	1.08 (27)	1.99 (51)	2.53 (64)	2.78 (71)	2.19 (56)	1.66 (42)	1.41 (36)	1.33 (34)	0.53 (13)	0.37 (9.4)	16.72 (425)
Average snowfall inches (cm)	5.2 (13)	6.1 (15)	5.7 (14)	3.2 (8.1)	0.1 (0.25)	0 (0)	0 (0)	0 (0)	0 (0)	0.8 (2.0)	3.5 (8.9)	4.8 (12)	29.4 (73.25)
Source: http://www.wrcc.dri.edu/cgi-bin/cliMAIN.pl?sd3076

== Media ==
AM Radio

- KGFX (AM) 1060, (Country music)
- KCCR AM 1240, (Adult Contemporary)

FM Radio

- KGFX-FM 92.7, (Adult Contemporary)
- KPLO-FM 94.5, (Country music)
- KLXS FM 95.3, (Classic Hits)
- KJBI FM 100.1, (Classic Hits)

Television

- KTSD-TV Ch. 10 PBS
- KPLO-TV Ch. 13 CBS
- KDLV-TV Ch. 26 NBC

The Capital Journal is the local newspaper.

== Notable people ==
- Pierre Chouteau Jr. (1789–1865), French merchant and namesake of Pierre and Fort Pierre
- Walter Dale Miller, governor of South Dakota
- George Philip Jr., World War II naval officer, commanding officer of USS Twiggs (DD-591), Navy Cross recipient, and namesake of USS George Philip (FFG-12)
- Clint Roberts, U.S. representative from South Dakota
- Mike Rounds, U.S. senator and governor of South Dakota
- Casey Tibbs, rodeo cowboy and actor
- John C. Waldron, World War II aviator
