= Murdo, South Dakota =

- City
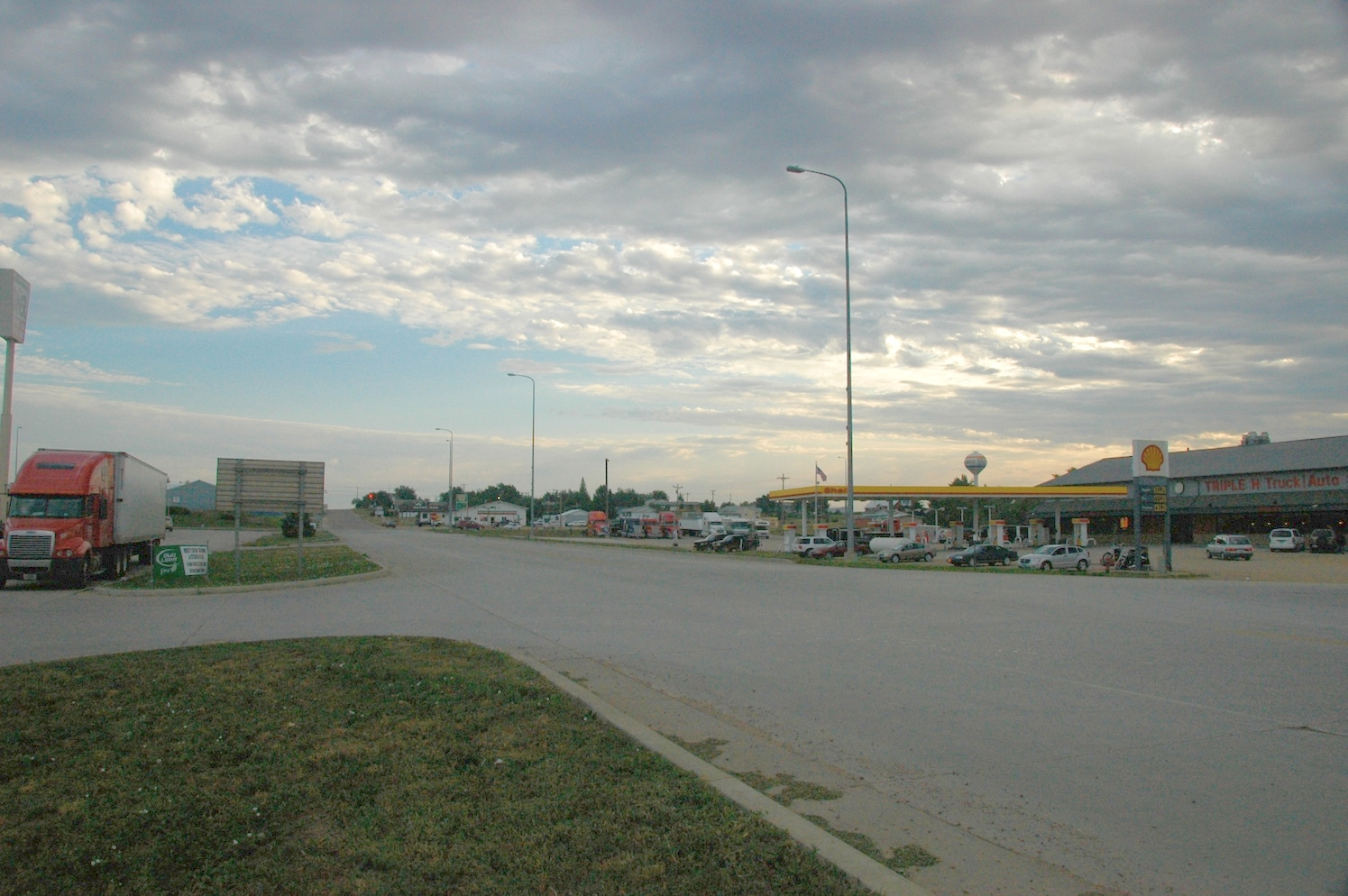
- Commercial district in Murdo, looking north from the I-90/US 83 interchange, August 2008

- Location in Jones County and the state of South Dakota
- Coordinates: 43°53′22″N 100°42′51″W
- Country: United States
- State: South Dakota
- County: Jones
- Incorporated: 1908

Area
  - Total: 0.63 sq mi (1.63 km^{2})
  - Land: 0.63 sq mi (1.63 km^{2})
  - Water: 0 sq mi (0.00 km^{2})
- Elevation: 2,320 ft (710 m)

Population (2020)
  - Total: 475
  - Density: 754.8/sq mi (291.42/km^{2})
- Time zone: UTC-6 (Central (CST))
  - Summer (DST): UTC-5 (CDT)
- ZIP code: 57559
- Area code: 605
- FIPS code: 46-44260
- GNIS feature ID: 1267488
- Website: www.murdosd.com

Murdo is a city in and the county seat of Jones County, South Dakota, United States. The population was 475 at the 2020 census.

== History ==
Murdo was founded in about 1907 by the Chicago, Milwaukee, St. Paul and Pacific Railroad. As about halfway between Rapid City and Mitchell, Murdo was home to a roundhouse and a railyard, and a passenger station which served trains bound for Rapid City and Mitchell, until the discontinuation of the Sioux passenger train. The town was named in honor of cattle baron Murdo MacKenzie. United States Senator John Thune is from Murdo, South Dakota.

== Geography ==
According to the United States Census Bureau, the city has a total area of 0.63 square miles (1.63 km^{2}), all land.

=== Climate ===
Murdo has a humid continental climate (Koppen Dfa), with cold winters and hot summers.

Climate data for Murdo, South Dakota (1991−2020 normals, extremes 1907−present)
Month	Jan	Feb	Mar	Apr	May	Jun	Jul	Aug	Sep	Oct	Nov	Dec	Year
Record high °F (°C)	75 (24)	76 (24)	90 (32)	102 (39)	107 (42)	108 (42)	116 (47)	115 (46)	108 (42)	103 (39)	88 (31)	75 (24)	116 (47)
Mean daily maximum °F (°C)	30.7 (−0.7)	34.4 (1.3)	45.4 (7.4)	56.6 (13.7)	67.5 (19.7)	78.5 (25.8)	86.7 (30.4)	85.4 (29.7)	76.5 (24.7)	60.3 (15.7)	45.3 (7.4)	33.4 (0.8)	58.4 (14.7)
Daily mean °F (°C)	21.1 (−6.1)	24.4 (−4.2)	34.7 (1.5)	45.4 (7.4)	56.6 (13.7)	67.5 (19.7)	74.6 (23.7)	73.1 (22.8)	63.9 (17.7)	48.8 (9.3)	35.0 (1.7)	24.2 (−4.3)	47.4 (8.6)
Mean daily minimum °F (°C)	11.6 (−11.3)	14.3 (−9.8)	24.0 (−4.4)	34.2 (1.2)	45.8 (7.7)	56.5 (13.6)	62.6 (17.0)	60.8 (16.0)	51.2 (10.7)	37.3 (2.9)	24.7 (−4.1)	14.9 (−9.5)	36.5 (2.5)
Record low °F (°C)	−35 (−37)	−33 (−36)	−21 (−29)	−3 (−19)	15 (−9)	32 (0)	40 (4)	36 (2)	17 (−8)	0 (−18)	−21 (−29)	−29 (−34)	−35 (−37)
Average precipitation inches (mm)	0.57 (14)	0.71 (18)	1.17 (30)	2.37 (60)	3.44 (87)	3.63 (92)	2.84 (72)	2.37 (60)	1.48 (38)	1.80 (46)	0.68 (17)	0.59 (15)	21.65 (550)
Average snowfall inches (cm)	7.5 (19)	8.5 (22)	8.1 (21)	6.8 (17)	0.0 (0.0)	0.0 (0.0)	0.0 (0.0)	0.0 (0.0)	0.0 (0.0)	1.8 (4.6)	5.6 (14)	10.8 (27)	49.1 (125)
Average precipitation days (≥ 0.01 in)	5.5	5.6	6.2	9.2	12.6	11.3	8.4	7.5	6.4	7.4	5.0	5.4	90.5
Average snowy days (≥ 0.1 in)	4.9	4.6	3.6	1.9	0.0	0.0	0.0	0.0	0.0	1.0	2.8	4.5	23.3
Source: NOAA

== Demographics ==
Historical population
Census	Pop.	Note	%±
1910	372		—
1920	500		34.4%
1930	619		23.8%
1940	680		9.9%
1950	739		8.7%
1960	783		6.0%
1970	865		10.5%
1980	723		−16.4%
1990	679		−6.1%
2000	612		−9.9%
2010	488		−20.3%
2020	475		−2.7%
U.S. Decennial Census; 2018 Estimate

=== 2020 census ===
As of the 2020 census, Murdo had a population of 475. The median age was 43.6 years. 24.6% of residents were under the age of 18 and 20.8% of residents were 65 years of age or older. For every 100 females there were 110.2 males, and for every 100 females age 18 and over there were 108.1 males age 18 and over.

0.0% of residents lived in urban areas, while 100.0% lived in rural areas.

There were 221 households in Murdo, of which 25.8% had children under the age of 18 living in them. Of all households, 40.7% were married-couple households, 29.0% were households with a male householder and no spouse or partner present, and 24.9% were households with a female householder and no spouse or partner present. About 39.8% of all households were made up of individuals and 17.6% had someone living alone who was 65 years of age or older.

There were 263 housing units, of which 16.0% were vacant. The homeowner vacancy rate was 0.0% and the rental vacancy rate was 9.3%.

Racial composition as of the 2020 census
Race	Number	Percent
White	367	77.3%
Black or African American	1	0.2%
American Indian and Alaska Native	49	10.3%
Asian	0	0.0%
Native Hawaiian and Other Pacific Islander	0	0.0%
Some other race	2	0.4%
Two or more races	56	11.8%
Hispanic or Latino (of any race)	8	1.7%

=== 2010 census ===
As of the census of 2010, there were 488 people, 237 households, and 128 families living in the city. The population density was 774.6 inhabitants per square mile (299.1/km^{2}). There were 291 housing units at an average density of 461.9 per square mile (178.3/km^{2}). The racial makeup of the city was 93.9% White, 0.2% African American, 3.5% Native American, and 2.5% from two or more races. Hispanic or Latino of any race were 0.8% of the population.

There were 237 households, of which 26.6% had children under the age of 18 living with them, 43.0% were married couples living together, 7.6% had a female householder with no husband present, 3.4% had a male householder with no wife present, and 46.0% were non-families. 43.0% of all households were made up of individuals, and 21.5% had someone living alone who was 65 years of age or older. The average household size was 2.06 and the average family size was 2.84.

The median age in the city was 45.1 years. 21.9% of residents were under the age of 18; 6.7% were between the ages of 18 and 24; 21.1% were from 25 to 44; 29.4% were from 45 to 64; and 20.7% were 65 years of age or older. The gender makeup of the city was 47.1% male and 52.9% female.

=== 2000 census ===
As of the 2000 census, there were 612 people, 271 households, and 160 families living in the city. The population density was 964.5 inhabitants per square mile (372.4/km^{2}). There were 315 housing units at an average density of 496.4 per square mile (191.7/km^{2}). The racial makeup of the city was 95.92% White, 2.94% Native American, and 1.14% from two or more races. Hispanic or Latino of any race were 0.49% of the population.

There were 271 households, of which 28.0% had children under the age of 18 living with them, 44.6% were married couples living together, 11.4% had a female householder with no husband present, and 40.6% were non-families. 37.6% of all households were made up of individuals, and 19.2% had someone living alone who was 65 years of age or older. The average household size was 2.26 and the average family size was 2.99.

Age distribution was 26.8% under the age of 18, 6.9% from 18 to 24, 25.2% from 25 to 44, 21.9% from 45 to 64, and 19.3% who were 65 years of age or older. The median age was 40 years. For every 100 females, there were 94.9 males. For every 100 females age 18 and over, there were 85.9 males.

The median household income was $30,104, and the median family income was $40,000. Males had a median income of $24,196 versus $17,917 for females. The per capita income for the city was $16,008. About 10.5% of families and 12.1% of the population were below the poverty line, including 15.3% of those under age 18 and 11.1% of those age 65 or over.

== See also ==
- List of cities in South Dakota
