= Dakota, Minnesota and Eastern Railroad =

Class II railroad of the Canadian Pacific Railway

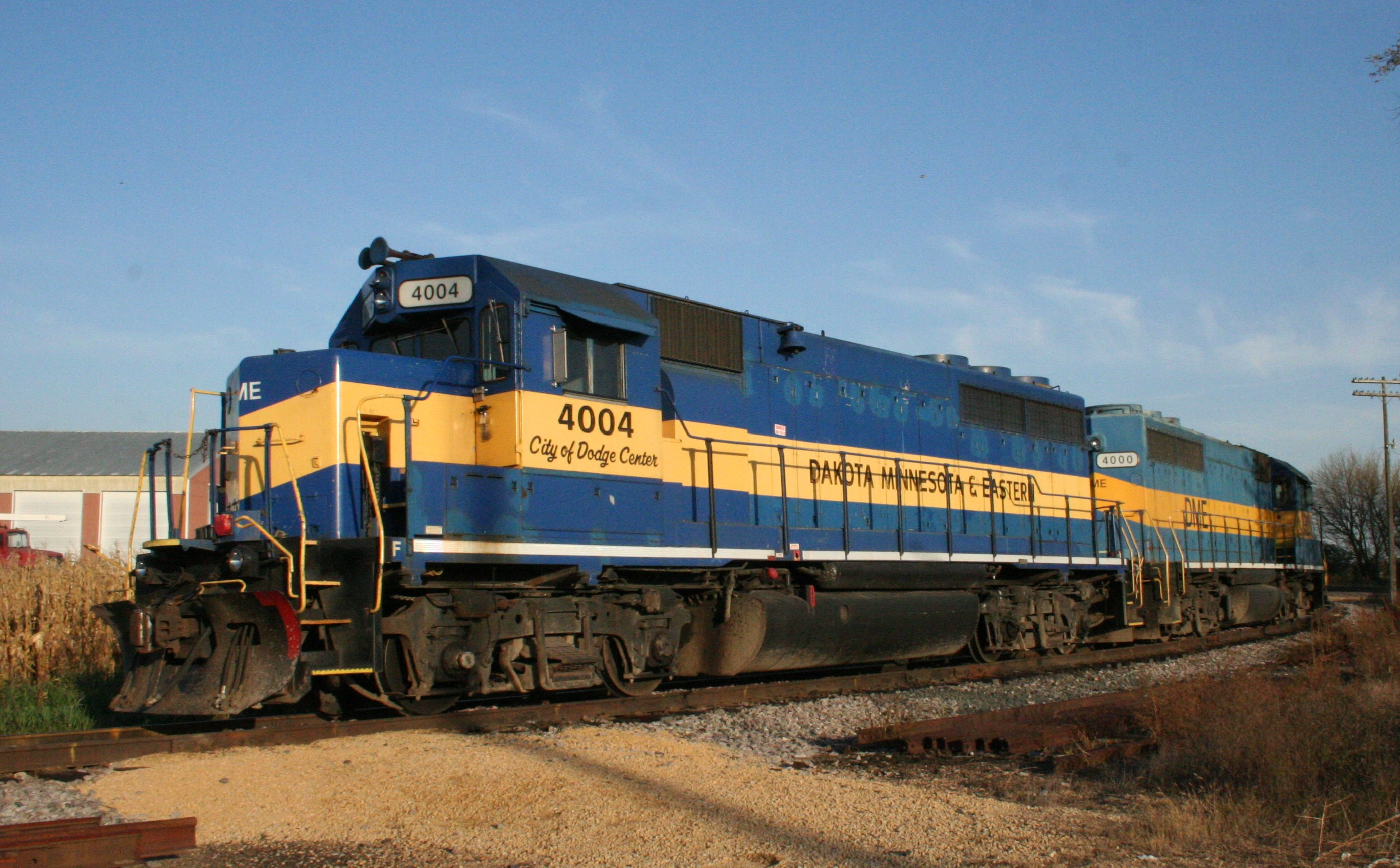
- DME 4004 and 4000 at Davis Junction, Illinois

Overview
- Headquarters: CPKC Plaza; Minneapolis, Minnesota
- Reporting mark: DME
- Locale: Iowa, Illinois, Minnesota, Nebraska, South Dakota and Wyoming; United States
- Dates of operation: 1986–2008
- Successor: Canadian Pacific Railway, Rapid City, Pierre and Eastern Railroad

Technical
- Track gauge: 4 ft 8 1/2 in (1,435 mm) standard gauge

The Dakota, Minnesota and Eastern Railroad (reporting mark DME) was a wholly owned U.S. subsidiary of the Canadian Pacific Kansas City. Before its purchase, it was the largest Class II railroad in the United States, operating across South Dakota and southern Minnesota in the Northern Plains of the United States. Portions of the railroad also extended into Wyoming, Nebraska, Iowa, and Illinois. It interchanged with all seven U.S. Class I railroads.

The DM&E began operations on September 5, 1986, over trackage spun off from the Chicago and North Western Transportation Company in South Dakota and Minnesota. The DM&E purchased the assets of I&M Rail Link railroad in 2002, renaming it Iowa, Chicago and Eastern Railroad. DM&E combined its management and dispatching duties with those of ICE under the holding company Cedar American Rail Holdings. The combined system connected Chicago through Iowa to Kansas City, Minneapolis-St. Paul and continued west to Rapid City, South Dakota. Smaller branches extended into Wisconsin, Wyoming and Nebraska.

In September 2007 it was announced that Canadian Pacific Railway would acquire the DM&E upon approval by the Surface Transportation Board of the US Department of Transportation. The STB announced its approval of the purchase plan on September 30, 2008. Lines west of Tracy, Minnesota were sold to Genesee & Wyoming in 2014 to form the Rapid City, Pierre and Eastern Railroad.

== 1986–1996: Startup and initial expansion ==
In 1983, the Chicago and North Western Railway (CNW) announced plans to abandon a section of railroad between Pierre, South Dakota and Rapid City. Due to pressure from customers and Senator Larry Pressler from South Dakota, a deal was reached and announced on April 24, 1986, to purchase divisions of the CNW from Winona, Minnesota, to Rapid City, creating the Dakota, Minnesota and Eastern Railroad. This deal also included buildings, rolling stock and locomotives, mostly rebuilt EMD SD9s, from the CNW. Many of the negotiations were handled by the office of Senator Larry Pressler and his legal counsel Kevin V. Schieffer. After DM&E's successful first decade, Schieffer succeeded J. C. McIntyre as president of the railroad on November 7, 1996.

DM&E began operations on this track on September 5, 1986. The railroad was expanded in 1995 when it acquired additional former CNW branch lines from Rapid City, South Dakota; to Colony, Wyoming; and Crawford, Nebraska. That same year, the CNW ceased to exist after being merged into Union Pacific.

From startup to the railroad's ten-year anniversary in 1996, DM&E hauled nearly 500,000 carloads of freight, which includes 700 million bushels of grain. DM&E celebrated the anniversary with picnics and employee appreciation events and excursions in Waseca, Minnesota, and Pierre, South Dakota.

Kevin V. Schieffer, whom former United States President George H. W. Bush had appointed as US Attorney for South Dakota in 1991, became president of DM&E on November 7, 1996. Schieffer was no newcomer to the railroad; he first became involved with DM&E in 1983 when he worked to prevent the abandonment of the former CNW lines that eventually formed the first sections of DM&E's mainline. Maintaining the status quo on DM&E was not the fate that he had in mind for the railroad as he took the reins.

== 1997–2006: plans for expansion into the Powder River Basin ==
=== Expansion plans ===
In 1997, DM&E announced plans to expand into the Powder River Basin (PRB) in Wyoming and provide unit coal train service from that area. The railroad filed an application for the expansion to the Surface Transportation Board (STB) on February 20, 1998. Burlington Northern Railroad built into this area in 1979, and the Chicago and North Western Railway (CNW) also sought to access the PRB coalfields, a project accomplished by CNW's successor Union Pacific Railroad. DM&E would become the third railroad to tap into the coal deposits in the region.

DM&E's expansion would require the construction of 281 miles (452 km) of new track, upgrading 598 miles (962 km) of existing track (including all of the railroad's mainline track in Minnesota), new mainline connections at Owatonna, and Mankato, Minnesota, and three new rail yards. The plan would be the largest new railroad construction in the United States since the completion of the Chicago, Milwaukee, St. Paul and Pacific Railroad (Milwaukee Road)'s Pacific extension to Seattle, Washington, in 1909.

=== Initial approval ===
The STB approved the application on December 10, 1998, pending completion of an Environmental Impact Statement (EIS), which was released by the STB on September 27, 2000.

An analysis of the plan by Minnesota's Dakota, Minnesota and Eastern Railroad Working Group in 2001 showed support among customers and freight shippers, but DM&E's expansion plan led to complaints among residents in communities along the railroad's right-of-way. While some communities welcomed the railroad's expansion plan as an opportunity for increased business within their own cities, other residents and businesses felt that roads in the area were not built with enough overpasses and underpasses to deal with the traffic flow problems that the longer and more frequent unit trains would produce at grade crossings. The objectors cited concerns of the general public in safely and quickly traversing their communities as well as the ability of emergency vehicles to cross the tracks to reach emergency scenes or hospitals. The city of Rochester, Minnesota, filed with the STB to compel the railroad to build a bypass around the city as a condition to granting the railroad permission to build the Powder River extension. The bypass was estimated to cost around US$100 million.

=== Further legal actions ===
After a period of public comment that lasted until March 16, 2001, and further review by the STB, the final EIS was issued on November 19, 2001. In this approval, the STB agreed with DM&E that no new bypasses around cities would be required even though the cities of Rochester, Minnesota, Brookings and Pierre, South Dakota, had requested them. In 2003, a ruling by the United States Court of Appeals for the Eighth Circuit ordered the STB to re-examine potential environmental issues around Rochester. The STB's preliminary report, released in early 2005, noted that no additional steps were needed by the railroad to alleviate noise and vibration caused by the projected increase in train traffic.

The court upheld the STB's approval with stipulations for the new line's environmental impact, including the projected increase in the frequency of train horn soundings along the line. From the court's ruling, the STB issued a Supplemental Environmental Impact Statement which set forth mitigation strategies for the railroad. On February 15, 2006, the STB announced its final approval of the railroad's 1998 application.

In April 2004, United States Court of Appeals for the Eighth Circuit upheld a lower court's actions in overturning part of South Dakota legislation passed in 1999 (two years after the railroad first announced its intentions to expand) that would have impaired railroad operations and construction in the state. The decision restored the legal process by which the railroad could effectively force landowners along the proposed new route to sell their land to the railroad.

=== Funding ===
With the final EIS in place and approval from the STB, DM&E had the authority to undertake the expansion as proposed, but needed financing. On February 26, 2007, the FRA rejected a proposed $2.3 billion loan to DM&E. In announcing the decision, Administrator Joseph H. Boardman noted that the project proposal met many federal requirements for the loan but cited concerns that the railroad might not be able to handle cost overruns during construction or to repay the loan after construction was completed.

== 2002–2007: consolidation with IC&E ==
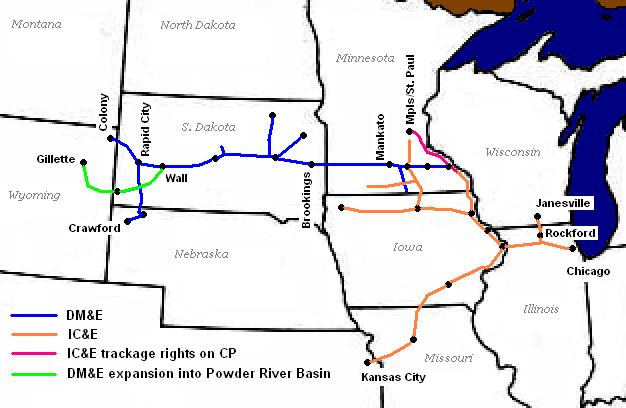
DM&E and IC&E combined route map as of 2002.

DM&E hauled nearly 60,000 carloads of freight in fiscal year 2002, serving approximately 130 customers along the railroad's mainline. Of these shipments, 53% were grains or grain products, 24% were bentonite and kaolin clay, 7% were cement, and 5% were wood and lumber products; the remaining 11% were split among all other types of freight.

On February 21, 2002, DM&E announced that it would purchase the railroad assets of 1,700-mile (2,700 km) I&M Rail Link (IMRL) from its then-owner The Washington Companies. DM&E renamed the IMRL property to Iowa, Chicago and Eastern Railroad (IC&E) and began operations on July 30, 2002. A purchase price was not stated in the original announcement, but an article in the May 2002 Trains Magazine reported that several industry sources believed the total to be around $150 million.

DM&E and IC&E combined management under the holding company Cedar American Rail Holdings. Locomotives of both railroads were given a unified paint scheme and interchanges were streamlined between the two railroads. The administration of both railroads was handled by Cedar, further streamlining processes between the two railroads. The combined DM&E–IC&E system made up the largest Class II railroad (by route-miles) in the United States; it was also the eighth largest system of all American railroads and the only system with direct rail connections with all Class I railroads in North America.

In its first twenty years of operations, the railroad's revenues had increased more than tenfold, from $22 million in 1987 to $258 million in 2006, with $290 million projected in 2007 and $340 million for 2008. Its operating ratio (the ratio of operating expenses to revenues) declined to 70.2% in 2006 and was projected to improve further to 67.6% in 2007. Its traffic was a mix of agricultural, coal, and industrial products, and ethanol shipments were projected to exceed one billion gallons in 2008.

== Acquisition by Canadian Pacific ==
On September 4, 2007, Canadian Pacific (CP) announced it was acquiring the DM&E from its owners, London-based Electra Private Equity, for US$1.48 billion, and future payments of over $1.0 billion contingent on commencement of construction on the Powder River extension and specified volumes of coal shipments from the Powder River basin. The transaction included the ICE and other affiliated companies. The merger was an "end-to-end" consolidation; the lines had interchanged at three points, including the Winona, Minnesota, connection between the DM&E's main line across southern Minnesota and CP's Chicago main. Kevin Schieffer, then-president of the DM&E, called CP the DM&E's "natural partner" and the transaction a "natural fit".

The acquisition gave CP access to shipments of agricultural products and ethanol in addition to coal from the Wyoming coal fields. CP stated its intention to the purchase to gain access to the Powder River and ship coal to Midwestern and Eastern utilities. The transaction required the approval of the Surface Transportation Board, which was expected to take a year. Securities analysts said that competing railroads for Powder River coal, the Union Pacific and BNSF, could challenge the acquisition and delay STB approval, but were unlikely to have prevented it. Until approval, the DM&E continued to operate as a separate entity.

On October 4, 2007, CP announced that it had completed the financial transactions to acquire the DM&E and its subsidiaries. Control of DM&E was placed into a voting trust to remain in effect until the STB issued its decision on the acquisition. Richard Hamlin was appointed its trustee. CP planned to integrate DM&E's operations once it received STB approval. CP expected STB approval of the purchase in October 2008. The STB announced its approval of the purchase plan on September 30, 2008, with no further conditions. CP assumed control of DM&E and IC&E on October 30, 2008, the effective date of the purchase.

== Western Minnesota and South Dakota divisions to RCPE ==
On December 3, 2012, CP announced it was indefinitely placing on hold plans for building new trackage into the Powder River Basin. The next day the railroad announced its intention to sell the entire ex-DM&E west of Tracy, Minnesota, roughly 700 miles (1,100 km) of track. On January 2, 2014, CP announced that all track west of Tracy, Minnesota, was to be sold to Rapid City, Pierre and Eastern Railroad, a subsidiary of Genesee & Wyoming, a short line operator. The sale was completed on May 30, 2014, for $210 million. Most of the Rapid City, Pierre and Eastern's employees came over from the DM&E.

== Subdivisions ==
DM&E operated over twelve subdivisions. The divisions were located in Minnesota, South Dakota, Iowa, and Nebraska. As of 2014, three are retained by the Canadian Pacific, nine are part of the Rapid City, Pierre and Eastern.

=== Canadian Pacific ===
- Waseca Subdivision – Winona to Waseca, Minnesota
- Hartland Subdivision – Waseca, Minnesota to Mason City, Iowa
- Tracy Subdivision – Waseca to Tracy, Minnesota

=== Former DM&E to RCPE ===
- Huron Subdivision – Tracy, Minnesota to Huron, South Dakota
- Yale Spur Subdivision – Huron to Watertown, South Dakota
- Redfield Subdivision – Aberdeen to Wolsey, South Dakota
- Mansfield Subdivision – Redfield to Mansfield, South Dakota
- Pierre Subdivision – Huron to Pierre, South Dakota
- Onida Subdivision – Blunt to Onida, South Dakota
- PRC Subdivision – Pierre to Rapid City, South Dakota
- Black Hills Subdivision – Colony, Wyoming to Dakota Junction, Nebraska
- Crawford Subdivision – Chadron, Nebraska to Crawford, Nebraska

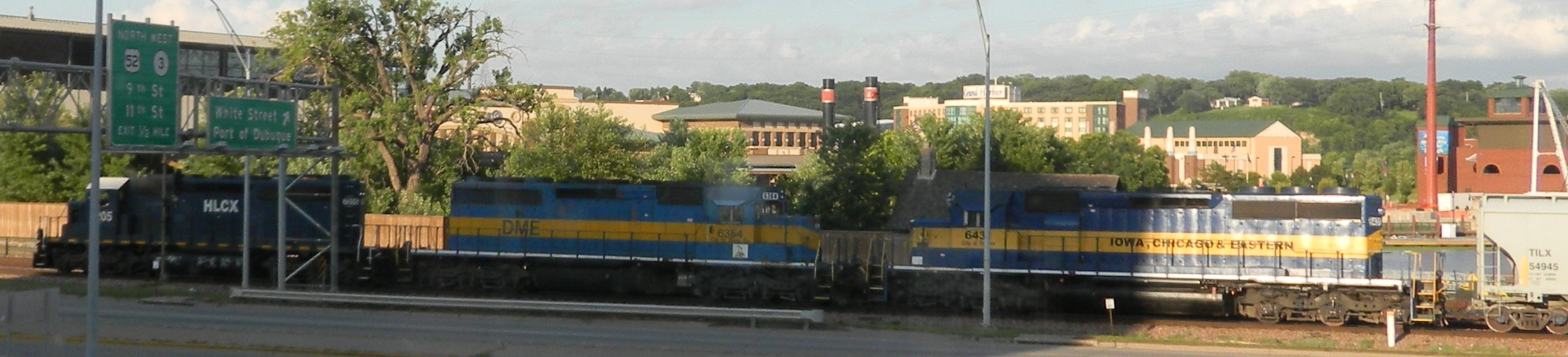
A lashup of HLCX, DME and ICE locomotives at Dubuque, Iowa

== Rolling stock ==
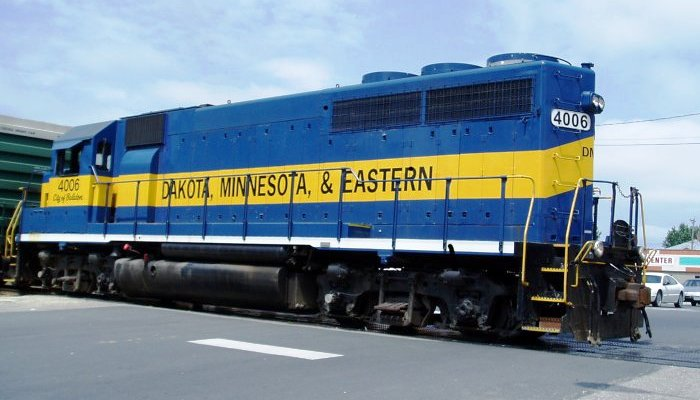
DME 4006, City of Balaton, an EMD GP40.

DM&E originally purchased used first-generation locomotives from a variety of railroads; in the early years it was more common to see a locomotive with a Milwaukee Road or Chicago and North Western Railway paint scheme than a DM&E paint scheme. Over the years, the locomotives were repainted, many with DM&E's paint scheme of blue with a yellow stripe along its length (it closely mirrored by that of sister railroad, IC&E).

DM&E eventually assigned names to all of its locomotives when they were repainted, usually after locations along its right-of-way, but a few exceptions have been named for people (like road number 550, named after Senator Larry Pressler). All of the first-generation diesel locomotives purchased from Chicago and North Western and Milwaukee Road have since been replaced with more recent locomotives, although the newer locomotives were also bought used.

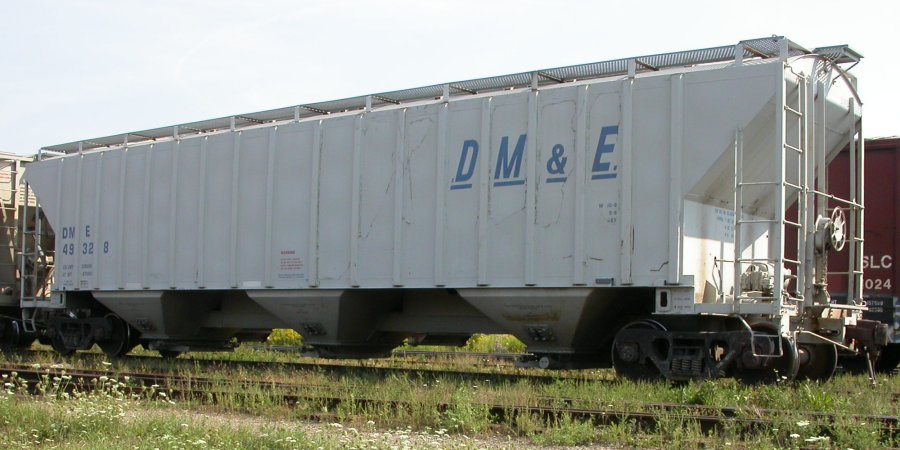
DME 49328, a covered hopper.

In 1987, at the railroad's one-year anniversary, DM&E owned 39 locomotives and leased five more for a total of 44 locomotives rostered. By the railroad's tenth anniversary in 1996, DM&E owned 69 locomotives and owned or leased over 1,500 cars, including over 600 covered hoppers for grain and cement shipments. In 2001, the number of locomotives owned stayed about the same, while the number of cars increased to about 5,000 with 52% of them in dedicated grain service.

== Company officers ==
DM&E has had three men serve as president of the railroad:

- J. C. (Pete) McIntyre (1986–1996) began his railroad career in 1953, eventually working for Chicago and North Western in the early 1980s. When DM&E was formed in 1986, McIntyre became the new railroad's first president.
- Kevin V. Schieffer (1996–2008) served as counsel for Senator Larry Pressler starting in 1982. Schieffer began working with DM&E business in 1983 when he worked to prevent the abandonment of CNW branch lines that would eventually form the beginnings of DM&E. He initiated the negotiations in 1985 that led to DM&E's creation. He was promoted to Chief of Staff for Senator Pressler in 1987, a position he held until 1991 when United States President George H. W. Bush appointed Schieffer to be US Attorney for South Dakota. In 1993, Schieffer left his US Attorney post and became the legal counsel for DM&E; as legal counsel for the railroad, he oversaw the railroad's recapitalization in 1994 and the acquisition of CNW's Colony line. He held this position until he was unanimously elected president of the railroad on November 7, 1996. Schieffer left the DM&E on October 7, 2008, shortly after the Surface Transportation Board approved the proposed purchase of the railroad by Canadian Pacific; DM&E's COO Ed Terbell and CFO Kurt Feaster were named to manage the railroad until CP completed the acquisition October 30, 2008.
- Vern Graham (2008–2010) was appointed president November 5, 2008.
