= Special routes of U.S. Route 14 =

Special routes of U.S. Route 14

Highway system
- United States Numbered Highway System; List; Special; Divided

At least 14 special routes of U.S. Route 14 (US 14) have existed.

== Wyoming ==
=== Wyoming alternate route ===
U.S. Highway 14A
- Medicine Wheel Passage
- Location: Cody–Burgess Junction, Wyoming
- Length: 98.600 mi (158.681 km)

U.S. Highway 14A (US 14A) is an alternate route for US 14 between Cody and Burgess Junction, Wyoming, known as the Medicine Wheel Passage.

=== Sheridan business route ===
U.S. Highway 14 Business
- Location: Sheridan, Wyoming
- Length: 4.526 mi (7.284 km)

U.S. Highway 14 Business (US 14 Bus.) is a route completely concurrent with Interstate 90 Business (I-90 Bus.), as well as U.S. Highway 87 Business (US 87 Bus.) and a portion of U.S. Highway 87 (US 87), and provides access to downtown Sheridan in an area where US 14 was routed to follow I-90.

== South Dakota ==
=== South Dakota alternate route ===
U.S. Highway 14A
- Location: Spearfish–Sturgis, South Dakota
- Length: 42 mi (68 km)

U.S. Highway 14A (US 14A) is an alternate route for US 14 between Spearfish and Sturgis, South Dakota, located mostly south of the I-90/US 14 overlap. The route begins at the I-90/US 14/US 85 overlap at exit 14 which serves 27th Street. It briefly runs south and then turns west along East Colorado Boulevard (I-90 Bus.), which is used as a frontage road along the south side of I-90. In between US 14A and I-90 is the Spearfish Recreational Trail. I-90 Bus./US 14A moves away from I-90 just before the intersection with Sandstone Hills Drive. At Spearfish Canyon Highway, US 14A leaves the overlap with I-90 Bus. and turns south. A spur of the Spearfish Recreational Trail leave US 14A at Winterville Road, and, in the vicinity of the southern trailhead of the Spearfish Path, the route begins to wind around Spearfish Creek and Spearfish Canyon running through the North Hills of Black Hills National Forest, which includes scenic areas for both cars and hikers, and unincorporated communities and ghost towns such as Maurice, Victoria, and Elmore.

In Cheyenne Crossing, the road turns left and begins the first of two overlaps with US 85. The two routes form a concurrency from there to Lead, then are separated where it continues north also overlapping US 85 Truck, only to turn east as the routes run through Center City and Backtail. The route meets US 85 again in Deadwood. The routes run together through Deadwood before splitting again, and US 14A turns east along Boulder Canyon Highway. US 14A ends in Sturgis at the I-90/US 14 interchange at exit 30, but the road continues as another I-90 Bus. with an overlap of South Dakota Highway 34 (SD 34) and SD 79.

=== Rapid City business loop ===
U.S. Highway 14 Business
- Location: Rapid City, South Dakota

=== Pierre truck route ===
U.S. Highway 14 Truck
- Location: Pierre, South Dakota
- Length: 4.8 mi (7.7 km)

U.S. Highway 14 Truck (US 14 Truck) is a truck route of US 14 in Pierre, South Dakota. Trucks and overheight vehicles use the truck route to avoid colliding with a low-clearance railroad overpass. The truck route begins at Pierre Street and travels eastward along Sioux Avenue. At 0.8 miles (1.3 km), the truck route turns northeastward and crosses the same railroad but at a railroad crossing. The route then runs along Wells Avenue for over one mile (1.6 km) before turning north along Garfield Avenue. It then continues northward for around 2.8 miles (4.5 km) before meeting US 14/US 83.

=== Huron business loop ===
U.S. Highway 14 Business
- Location: Huron, South Dakota

U.S. Highway 14 Business (US 14 Bus.) is an unmarked business loop of US 14 in Huron, South Dakota. The business route begins at the intersection with West Park Avenue running south in an overlap to Old Highway 14, then turns left onto Old Highway 14 running in close proximity of the south side of the Rapid City, Pierre and Eastern Railroad (RCPE)'s Pierre Subdivision. At Lincoln Avenue, Old Highway 14 becomes Market Street Southwest and passes by the northern edge of the South Dakota State Fairgrounds. East of Livestock Avenue, the road curves around a railroad junction with a former Great Northern Railway line (now the Yale Spur Subdivision) but still rejoins the same trajectory of the railroad line, albeit further away. Market Street Southwest becomes Market Street Southeast at the intersection with SD 37. Once it passes by the Chicago and North Western Roundhouse, the Pierre Subdivision becomes the Huron Subdivision.

Market Street Southeast ends at Frank Avenue Southeast and the route runs for one block south until the intersection with Third Street Southeast then turns east once again. East of Lawnridge Avenue, the road enters Riverside Park where it crosses a bridge over the James River. Immediately after the bridge, the route leaves Third Street and turns north at Riverside Avenue, passing under the Huron Subdivision which uses the former Chicago and North Western Transportation Company bridge over the James River. Riverside Avenue runs along the east side of the river but then begins to pull away from it before the road ends at a flyover interchange with eastbound US 14 and westbound US 14.

=== Brookings bypass route ===
U.S. Highway 14 Bypass
- Location: Brookings, South Dakota
- Length: 5.2 mi (8.4 km)

U.S. Highway 14 Bypass (US 14 Byp.) is a bypass route of US 14 along the northern edge of Brookings, South Dakota. The bypass route begins at a partial interchange with US 14 and travels eastward in a somewhat straight line. After meeting and passing I-29, the route begins to curve south before ending at US 14.

== Minnesota ==
=== Dodge Center business loop ===
U.S. Highway 14 Business
- Location: Dodge Center, Minnesota
- Length: 5.7 mi (9.2 km)

U.S. Highway 14 Business (US 14 Bus.) is a business loop of US 14 in Dodge Center, Minnesota. The business route begins at a dogbone interchange and travels northeast alongside Minnesota State Highway 56 (MN 56). After around 1.7 miles (2.7 km), US 14 Bus. turns east off from MN 56 and begins curving southeast. The business route runs concurrently with County Road 34 along the way eastward. In Dodge Center, the road becomes Highway Street. At the town limit east of Dodge Center, the route turns south and joins back with US 14.

== Wisconsin ==
=== Madison business loop ===
Business U.S. Highway 14
- Location: Madison, Wisconsin
- Existed: 1963–early 1970s

City U.S. Highway 14
- Location: Madison, Wisconsin
- Existed: 1952–1963

=== Janesville business loop ===
Business U.S. Highway 14
- Location: Janesville, Wisconsin
- Length: 8.4 mi (13.5 km)
- Existed: 1963–c. 2006

City U.S. Highway 14
- Location: Janesville, Wisconsin
- Length: 8.4 mi (13.5 km)
- Existed: 1952–1963

Business U.S. Highway 14 (Bus. US 14) in Janesville, Wisconsin, was a locally posted route along what used to be mainline US 14 until 1952. Currently, only the portion from I-39/I-90, east toward US 14 east of Janesville, runs along State Trunk Highway 11 (WIS 11). Northwest of Janesville, Bus. US 14 runs along County Trunk Highway E (CTH-E)/Washington Street.

Signage for Bus. US 14 appears to be missing at some locations within the city. It is unknown if the route markers are currently being maintained by the city or if they are no longer being replaced as they reach the end of their lifespans. In 2001, however, the Wisconsin Department of Transportation (WisDOT) removed Bus. US 14 west of the Rock River from official road maps, and, in 2006, the remaining section east of the river was removed.

While City U.S. Highway 14 (City US 14) became Bus. US 14 in 1963, several City US 14 route marker assemblies remain in Janesville. Also, the first reassurance marker assembly along CTH-E also includes a sign for Bus. US 14.

== Illinois ==
=== Woodstock business loop ===
U.S. Route 14 Business
- Location: Woodstock, Illinois
- Existed: 1963–1971

U.S. Route 14 Business (US 14 Bus.) was a business route of US 14 in Woodstock, Illinois. Prior to 1962, US 14 traveled through the city of Woodstock. In 1962, US 14 moved south to travel on a newly-built bypass. US 14 Bus. was then signed in 1963, which traveled along the former alignment in Woodstock. This designation lasted until 1971 when the business route was removed.

== See also ==
- List of special routes of the United States Numbered Highway System
