= I&M Rail Link =

Defunct American railroad

Overview
- Reporting mark: IMRL
- Locale: Illinois, Iowa, Minnesota, Missouri and Wisconsin
- Dates of operation: 1997–2002
- Successor: Iowa, Chicago and Eastern Railroad

Technical
- Track gauge: 4 ft 8 1/2 in (1,435 mm) standard gauge

The I&M Rail Link (reporting mark IMRL) was a railroad operating in the north central portion of the United States. The company commenced operations on April 5, 1997, acquiring lines from the Canadian Pacific Railway and Soo Line Railroad.

On July 31, 2002, the Iowa, Chicago and Eastern Railroad took over the IMRL's operations.

== History ==
The I&M Rail Link, owned by the Washington Companies, operated 1,385 miles (2,229 km) of trackage in the states of Illinois, Iowa, Minnesota, Missouri, and Wisconsin. The lines were acquired from the Canadian Pacific Railway, which were originally built by the Milwaukee Road and its predecessors. The railroad commenced operations at 12:01 p.m. April 5, 1997.

Canadian Pacific Railway retained a 33% ownership in the new company and the Washington Corporation obtained the remaining 67%. The new railroad was headquartered in Davenport, Iowa, with Nahant Yard becoming the base for most operations and locomotive maintenance. Heavy locomotive repairs were handled by National Railway Equipment in Silvis, Illinois. Train dispatching was first handled by the Canadian Pacific, but those duties were later performed by the Montana Rail Link in Missoula, Montana, which is another Washington subsidiary. IMRL's principal commodities included steel, coal, agricultural, and chemical products. The railroad operated with 2,284 freight cars and 118 locomotives. Train operations continued much as they did during Soo Line and CP Rail ownership.

In late 2001 Washington sought to divest itself of the railroad, stating that it was unprofitable. On July 29, 2002 the assets of the I&M Rail Link, LLC were transferred to the Iowa, Chicago & Eastern, which was owned by the Dakota, Minnesota & Eastern subsidiary, Cedar American Railroad Holdings. Operations were curtailed at 12:01 p.m. on that date. Six years later, Canadian Pacific acquired the IC&E, along with the DM&E.
