= Iowa, Chicago and Eastern Railroad =

Defunct American railroad

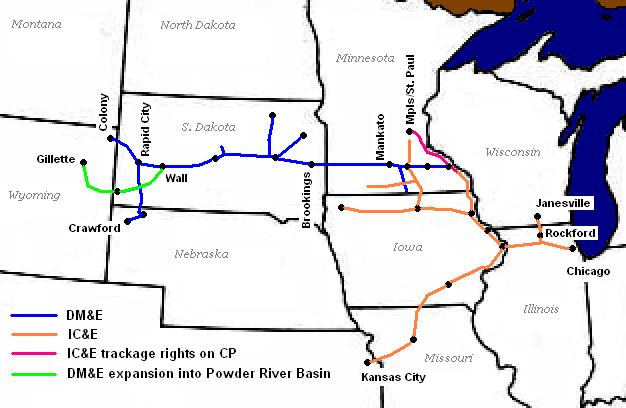
- DM&E and IC&E combined system map as of 2002.

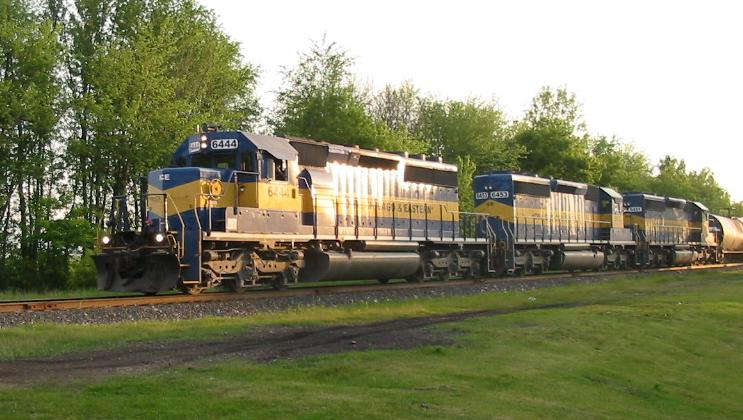
- An eastbound IC&E train with a trio of SD40-2s running through Fairdale, Illinois.

Overview
- Headquarters: Sioux Falls, South Dakota
- Reporting mark: ICE
- Locale: Illinois, Iowa, Minnesota, Missouri, and Wisconsin
- Dates of operation: 2002–2008
- Successor: Canadian Pacific/Rapid City, Pierre & Eastern Railroad

Technical
- Track gauge: 4 ft 8 1/2 in (1,435 mm) standard gauge
- Length: 1,400 mi (2,300 km)

The Iowa, Chicago and Eastern Railroad (IC&E) (reporting mark ICE) was a Class II railroad operating in the north central United States. It has been controlled by the Canadian Pacific Railway and operated as a part of its system since October 30, 2008. Formerly, the IC&E was jointly owned with the Dakota, Minnesota and Eastern Railroad by Cedar American Rail Holdings (CARH), making the combined system the largest class II railroad in the United States. Created by the purchase of I&M Rail Link, IC&E commenced operations on July 30, 2002. The 1,400-mile (2,300 km) line, based in Davenport, Iowa, serves the states of Illinois, Iowa, Missouri, Minnesota and Wisconsin. Principal commodities include chemicals, coal, steel, automobiles, and agricultural products. Train dispatching is performed at a joint DM&E/IC&E facility in Sioux Falls, South Dakota. On December 26, 2008, the IC&E was merged into parent CARH, which immediately merged into the DM&E.

== History ==
The IC&E was formed in 2002 to take over the operations of the I&M Rail Link (IMRL). The Illinois and the majority of the Iowa portions of the ICE were originally part of the Chicago, Milwaukee, St. Paul and Pacific Railroad (Milwaukee Road). In 1986, the Soo Line Railroad, a subsidiary of Canadian Pacific, purchased the Milwaukee Road, and began operations on these lines. Canadian Pacific then assumed full ownership of the lines after absorbing the Soo.

Facing operating losses, the northern Illinois and Iowa lines were offered for sale by Canadian Pacific in 1997, and the I&M Rail Link purchased the line later that year. However, the Washington Corporation stated that the I&M's operations were not as profitably sound as expected, so Washington sold the I&M to the Dakota, Minnesota & Eastern Railroad in 2002, which acquired the assets of the I&M, rechristening it to the IC&E.

In contrast to the two previous owners, the IC&E was able to turn a profit, and after five years of growth, Canadian Pacific announced its intentions to purchase both the IC&E and its sister company the DM&E in late 2007. This effectively allowed CP to reacquire the same lines it had sold only a decade prior.

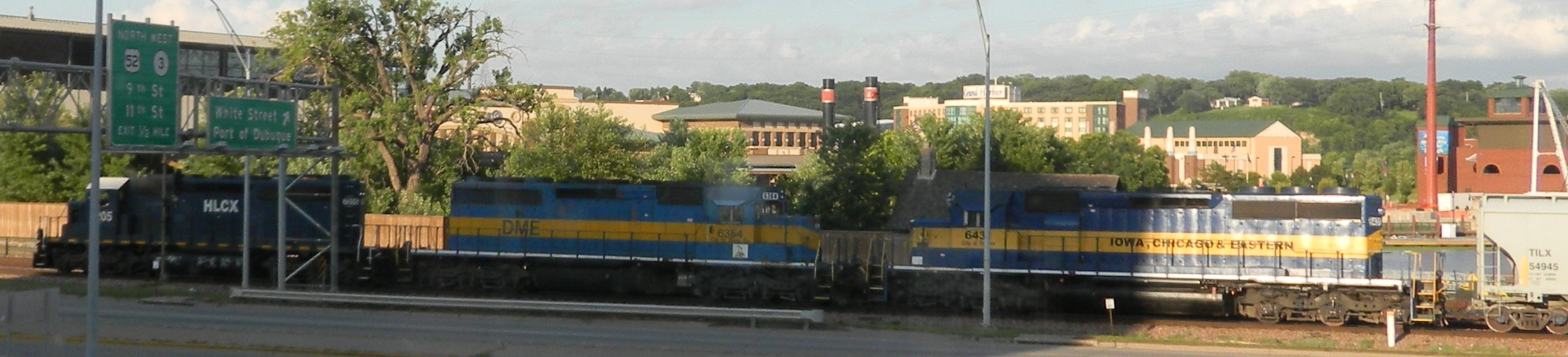
A lashup of HLCX, DME, and ICE locomotives in Dubuque, Iowa

Members of the Brotherhood of Locomotive Engineers and Trainmen (BLET), a division of the Teamsters, gained a contract with the transportation crews on January 24, 2005. Railroad employees first organized under the labor union on December 17, 2003.

== Acquisition ==
On September 4, 2007, Canadian Pacific Railway announced its intention to purchase the Dakota, Minnesota and Eastern Railroad in a transaction that would include the IC&E and other affiliated companies.

On September 30, 2008, the United States Surface Transportation Board announced its approval of Canadian Pacific's proposed purchase of the DM&E, IC&E and Cedar American Rail Holdings, with the official last day of operations for DM&E and IC&E scheduled for October 30, 2008.

Canadian Pacific purchased Kansas City Southern in December 2021 for US$31 billion, and in April 2023 the two railroads merged to form Canadian Pacific Kansas City (CPKC), making the IC&E, along with DM&E, subsidiaries of CPKC.

== Equipment ==
Motive power consisted of mostly ex-UP EMD SD40-2s rebuilt by General Electric and ex-SP EMD GP40-2s rebuilt by National Rail Equipment in Silvis, Illinois. Four DM&E EMD GP38s along with several ex-IMRL engines rounded out the roster. The SD40-2s and GP40-2s were painted in a DM&E inspired blue and yellow scheme with the name of the railroad spelled out on the sides of the locomotive. Starting in 2005, many of the "new" engines carried names of the towns that IC&E served, a practice utilized on the DM&E.

== See also ==
- Regional railroad
