= Waseca =

Waseca may refer to:

- Waseca County, Minnesota, United States
  - Waseca, Minnesota, a city and the county seat
    - Federal Correctional Institution, Waseca, a low-security women's prison
  - Waseca Municipal Airport
- Waseca, Saskatchewan, Canada, a village

== See also ==
- University of Minnesota Waseca, a two-year technical college specializing in agriculture, from 1971 to 1992
- Waseca Subdivision, a railway line in Minnesota
