= Chicago and North Western Roundhouse =

- U.S. National Register of Historic Places
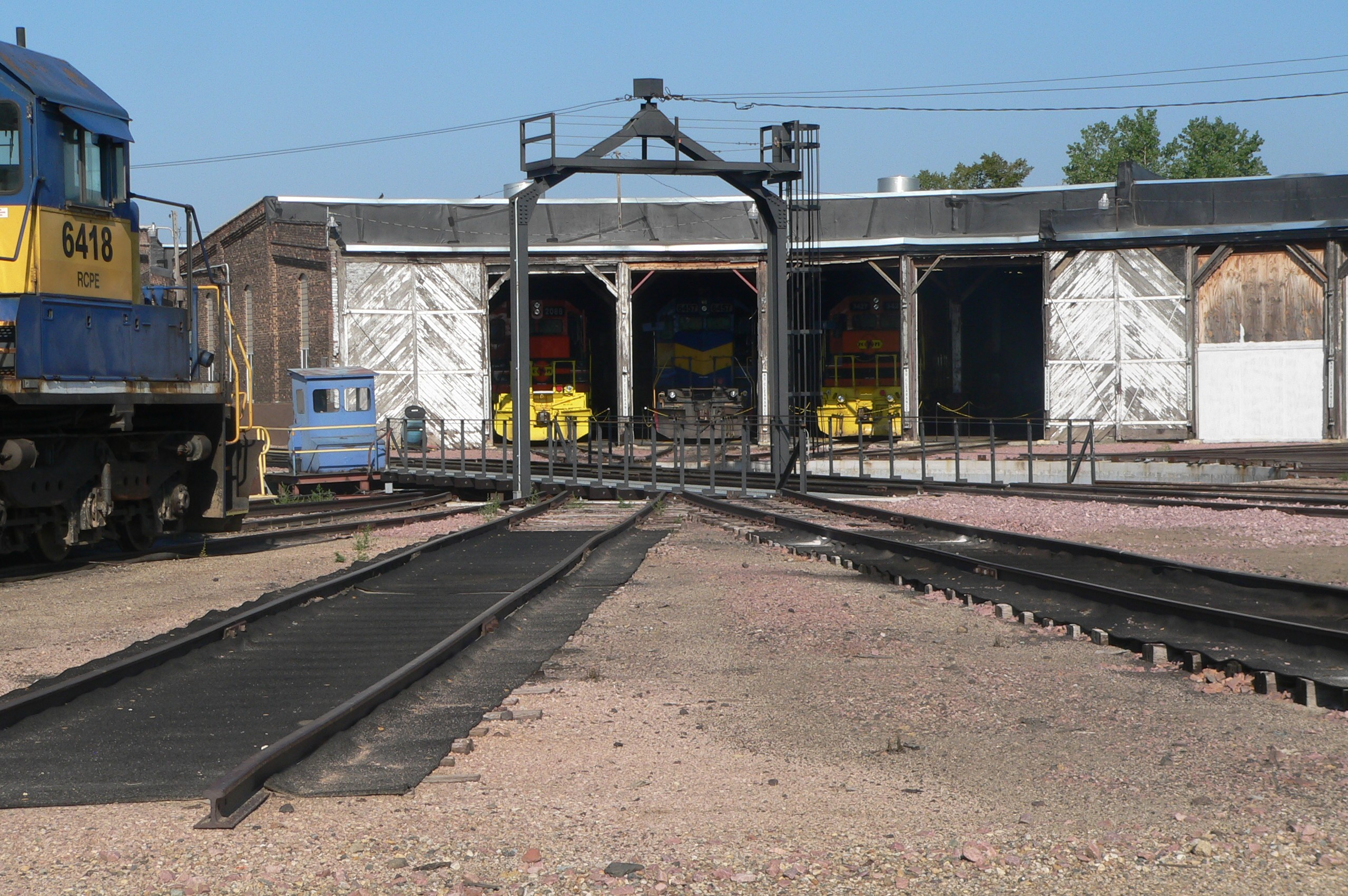
- Roundhouse behind turntable

- Location within South Dakota Location within the United States
- Location: North of First St., Huron, South Dakota
- Coordinates: 44°21′57″N 98°12′21″W
- Area: 4 acres (1.6 ha)
- Built: c. 1907
- Built by: Chicago & North Western Railroad
- Architectural style: Vernacular industrial
- MPS: Historic Railroads of South Dakota MPS
- NRHP reference No.: 98001411
- Added to NRHP: November 19, 1998

The Chicago and North Western Roundhouse in Huron, South Dakota was listed on the National Register of Historic Places in 1998. The listing included two contributing buildings and a contributing structure of the Chicago & North Western Railroad. It has also been known as C&NW Roundhouse and as Huron Roundhouse.

The roundhouse was built around 1907, with brick laid in common bond. The railway turntable, built at about the same time, is 75 feet (23 m) long. An office and storage building also from the same time, is a single-story building.

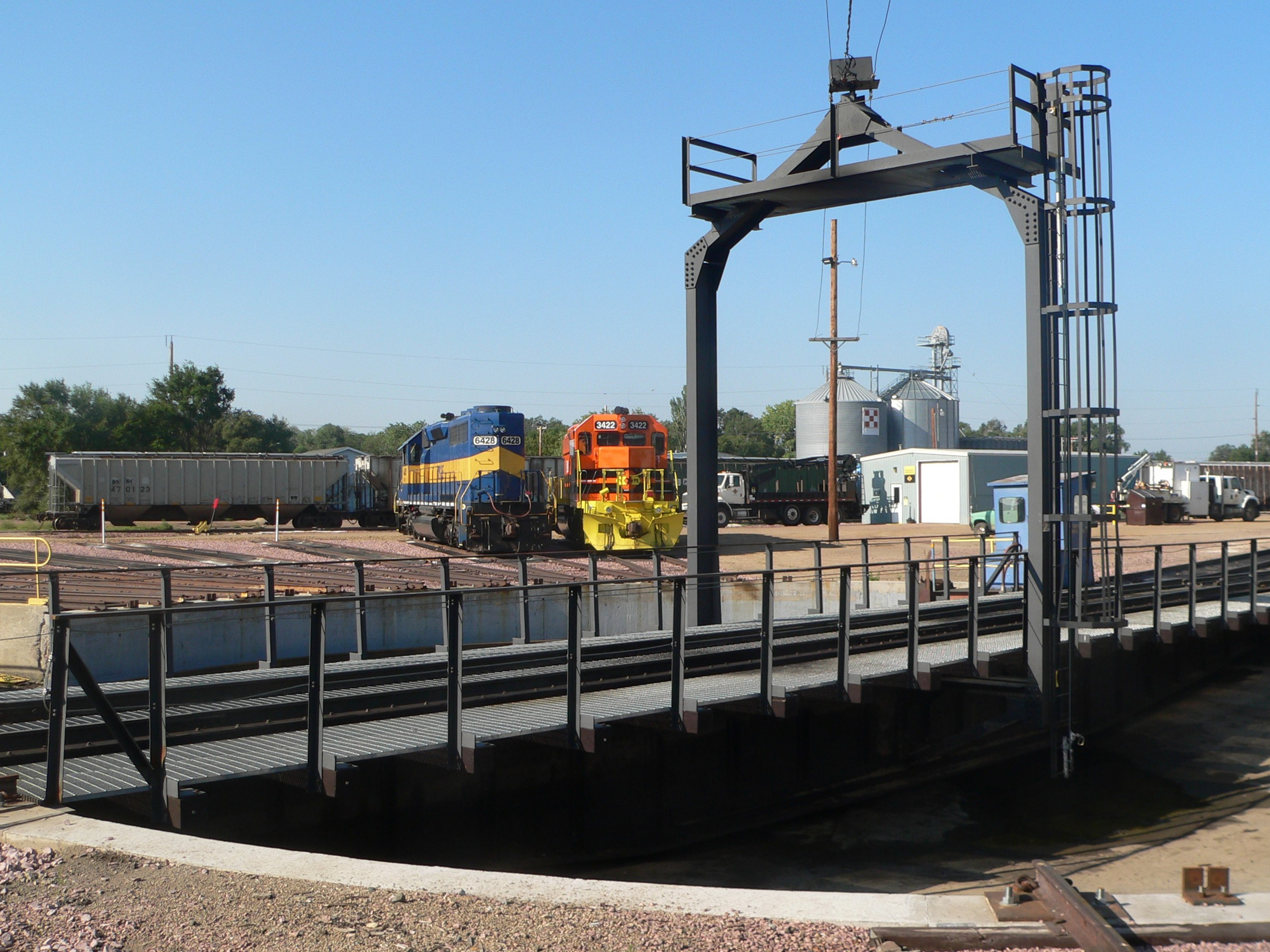
Turntable

== See also ==
- Dakota, Minnesota and Eastern Railroad
- Rapid City, Pierre and Eastern Railroad
