= Chicago and North Western Railroad Bridge =

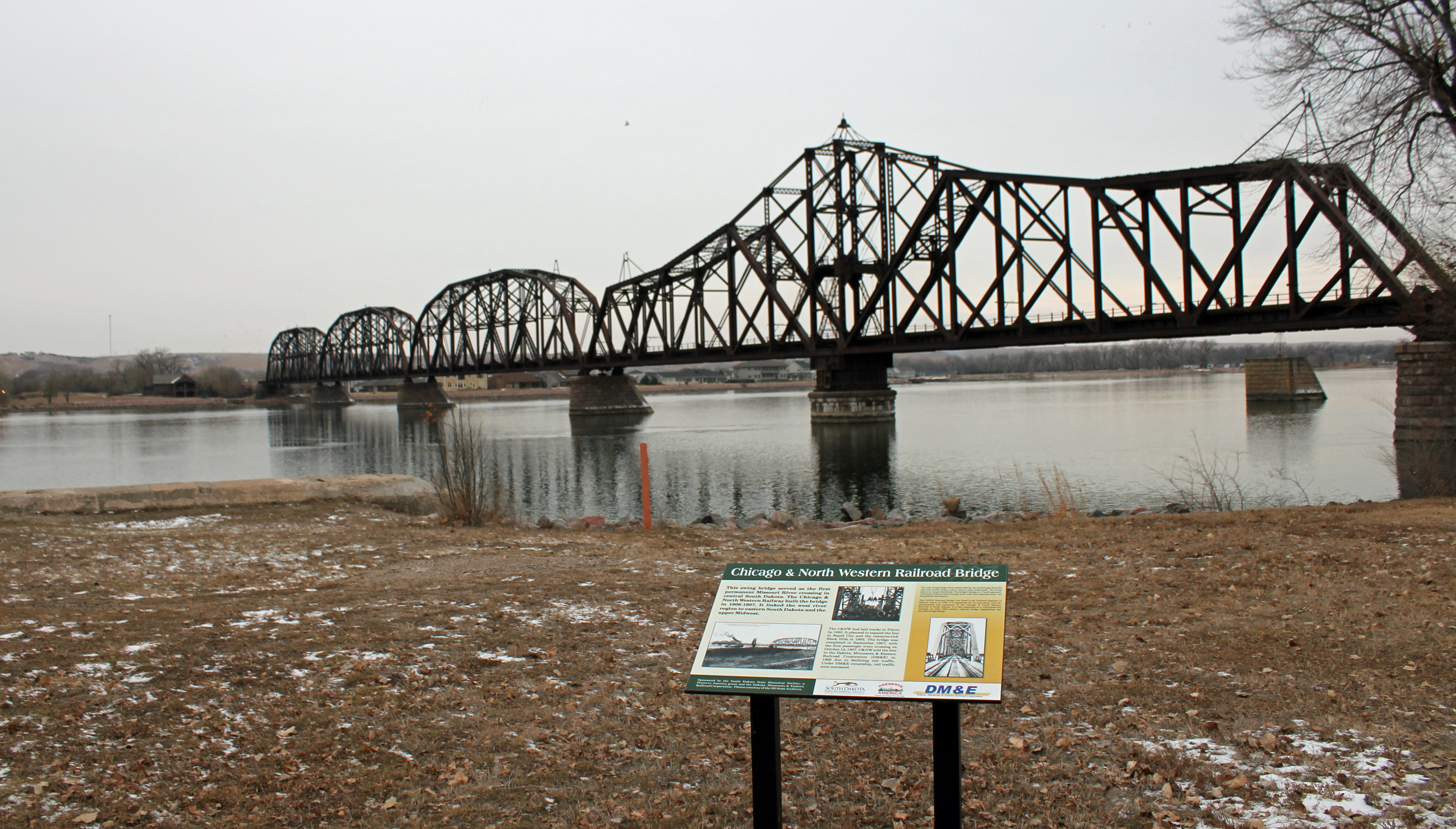
- Chicago and North Western Railroad Bridge
- Coordinates: 44°22′26″N 100°22′12″W
- Carries: Single railroad track Rapid City, Pierre and Eastern Railroad
- Crosses: Missouri River
- Locale: Pierre, South Dakota, and Fort Pierre, South Dakota
- Owner: Rapid City, Pierre and Eastern Railroad

Characteristics
- Design: Swing bridge

Rail characteristics
- No. of tracks: 1

History
- Constructed by: Pennsylvania Steel Company
- Construction start: 1905
- Construction end: 1907

Statistics
- Daily traffic: 2 trains daily
- Chicago and North Western Railroad Bridge
- U.S. National Register of Historic Places
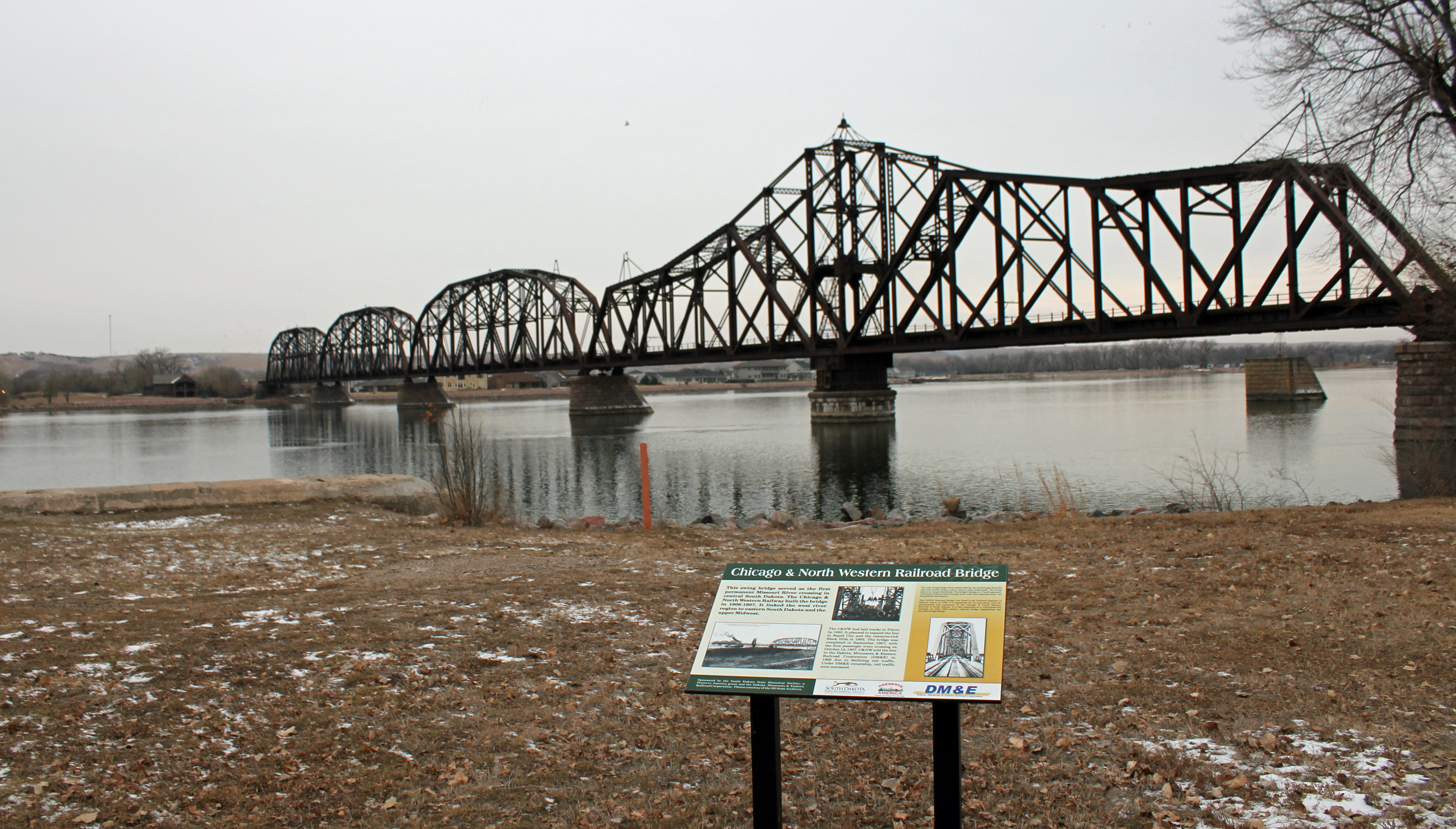

- Location within South Dakota Location within the United States
- Nearest city: Pierre, South Dakota
- Coordinates: 44°22′25″N 100°22′12″W
- Area: 4 acres (1.6 ha)
- Built: 1907
- Built by: Arthur McMullen & Co.; Pennsylvania Steel Co.
- Architectural style: Pennsylvania truss bridge
- MPS: Historic Railroads of South Dakota MPS
- NRHP reference No.: 98001412
- Added to NRHP: November 19, 1998

Location
- Interactive map of Chicago and North Western Railroad Bridge

The Chicago and North Western Railroad Bridge is a bridge on the National Register of Historic Places in Pierre, South Dakota. It was the first permanent bridge across the Missouri River in central South Dakota. The Pennsylvania through truss bridge is 2,200 feet (670 m) long and has two spans. The bridge's second span is a swing span; the bridge is the only extant swing bridge in South Dakota. The Pierre and Fort Pierre Bridge Railway, a company organized by the Chicago and Northwestern Railway, built the bridge in 1906 and 1907. It was to connect with the Chicago and Northwestern line on the east bank of the Missouri with the Pierre, Rapid City, and Northwestern railroad on the west bank at Fort Pierre.

It was added to the National Register on November 19, 1998. It currently is part of the PRC Subdivision railway line owned and operated by the Rapid City, Pierre and Eastern Railroad.
