= Tracy Subdivision =

Railway line in Minnesota

The Tracy Subdivision or Tracy Sub is a railway line in southern Minnesota owned and operated by the Dakota, Minnesota and Eastern Railroad (DM&E) subsidiary of Canadian Pacific. It begins at the end of the Waseca Subdivision in Waseca, Minnesota in the east and runs approximately 124 miles (200 km) west to Tracy, Minnesota. At Tracy, the rails continue as the Huron Subdivision of the Rapid City, Pierre and Eastern Railroad (RCPE). U.S. Highway 14 closely follows the train route.

The rail line had been built westward from Winona by the Winona and St. Peter Railroad. The Chicago and North Western Railway had taken ownership of the W&StP in 1867, and continued building the line west, though the Winona and St. Peter continued to operate under the old name for a considerable time afterward. The Winona & St Peter Railroad Company was organized March 10, 1862, and completed its line from Winona to Rochester, Minnesota, in 1864. In August it reached Owatonna.

In 1867 the Chicago and Northwestern Railway Company purchased the controlling shares in the Winona and St Peter. Further railroad milestones were: Janesville, Minnesota, in 1870, St. Peter in 1871, New Ulm (via Nicollet and Courtland) in 1872, and the western boundary of the state in 1874. The Winona Mankato and New Ulm Railroad Company was organized in 1870 and a railroad was built from New Ulm to Mankato and afterwards acquired by the Winona and St Peter.

The first branch line was completed in 1878 from Sleepy Eye to Redwood Falls, Minnesota. West of Tracy, the original mainline had gone northwest to Watertown, South Dakota and nearby Lake Kampeska. A rail line was started from Tracy in 1879, towards Volga, South Dakota. The line reached Pierre two years later.

Passenger train service continued on the line from its formation until the 1950s when the Dakota 400 was shortened to only run as far as Mankato. The train was renamed the Rochester 400, but passenger service ended entirely on July 23, 1963, when the Rochester 400 made its final run. Chicago and North Western continued to operate the line across southern Minnesota and South Dakota until the 1980s, but started planning to abandon it. The Dakota, Minnesota and Eastern Railroad was formed and took over the line in 1986. Canadian Pacific moved to purchase DM&E in 2007, which was completed in 2008.

RCPE Trains have trackage rights to move trains beyond Tracy to Mankato, to interchange with the Union Pacific.
