= Montana Resources LLP =

American mining company

Montana Resources LLP is an American mining company with headquarters in Butte, Montana. The company is owned by businessman Dennis Washington as a unit of The Washington Companies. The company employs about 350 people, and operates the Continental mine, an open pit copper and molybdenum mine at Butte. The Continental pit is the only active mining operation at Butte.

== History ==
The company formed in 1985 with the purpose of restarting copper mining at Butte. Mining, the town's mainstay and claim to fame, had been stopped several years previously when Anaconda Copper shut down its Butte mines. In 1986, Montana Minerals reactivated the Continental mine, which Anaconda had idled in 1983.

The Continental Pit closed again in 2000, but reopened in fall 2003.

As of 2006, remaining ore reserves at the Continental pit were estimated to be 364 million tonnes, averaging 0.35 percent copper, 0.027 percent molybdenum, and 2.2 g/tonne silver.
