= Dennis Washington =

American billionaire industrialist

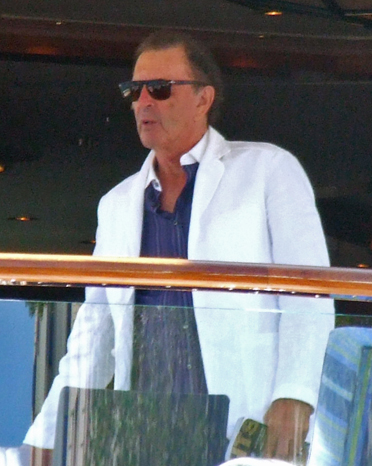
- Born: July 27, 1934 (age 92); Spokane, Washington, U.S.
- Citizenship: American; Canadian
- Occupations: Owner, The Washington Companies and Seaspan Marine Corporation
- Spouse: Phyllis Washington
- Children: 2 sons

Dennis R. Washington (born 1934) is an American and Canadian billionaire industrialist who owns a controlling interest in a large consortium of privately held companies, collectively known as the Washington Companies. The consortium's main assets are in British Columbia, Canada, Washington, and Montana. The largest holding is a family-managed industrial ship manufacturer and marine freight transport service known as Seaspan Marine Corporation based in Vancouver.

== Early life ==
Born in Spokane, Dennis Washington grew up in Spokane, Bremerton, Washington, and Missoula, Montana. His parents separated when he was very young, and Washington lived with his mother. He rarely saw his father, who worked in construction overseas. Washington did not grow up in a wealthy family. Additionally, he states his parents' divorce as his motivation to provide his own wife and children with a stable family environment.

== Career ==
Following graduation from high school, Dennis Washington worked in construction in Alaska and Montana. He began his business career at age 30 in 1964, with a $30,000 loan and a single bulldozer. He created Washington Construction, which worked primarily on highway contracts, and by 1969 was the largest contractor in Montana.

In the 1970s he moved into mining and dam construction. In 1986 he acquired a copper and molybdenum mine at Butte, Montana. He reopened the mine and it became a profitable operation. This success helped him diversify into railroads, marine services, coastal shipping, aviation and real estate. In 1996 Washington Construction acquired global construction and engineering company Morrison-Knudsen Corporation of Boise, Idaho, creating Washington Group International.

== Washington Companies ==
The Washington Companies are a group of individual privately held companies headquartered throughout the United States and western Canada and conducting business internationally.

Included in the Washington Companies' holdings are:

- Seaspan ULC is an association of Canadian companies involved in coastal marine transportation, shipdocking and ship escort, ship repair and shipbuilding services in western North America.
- Montana Rail Link is a Class II regional railroad that operates over 900 route miles of track in Montana and Idaho.
- Aviation Partners Inc. develops and markets the Blended Winglet Performance Enhancement System for business jet aircraft. .
- Envirocon Inc.’s core services include environmental remediation, ecological restoration, and decommissioning and demolition for government and commercial clients.
- Southern Railway of British Columbia (SRY) is a major transporter of freight in British Columbia.
- Modern Machinery Co. Inc. sells and rents heavy equipment, and supplies parts and service to support the construction, mining, aggregate, and logging industries.
- Montana Resources LLP operates an open-pit copper and molybdenum mine in Butte, Montana, near the Continental Divide.
- Seaspan Corporation (NYSE:SSW) is one of the world’s leading independent containership owners, owning and managing ships which are chartered long-term.

== Political activity ==
Together with his spouse, Washington contributed $1 million to Donald Trump's 2020 presidential campaign.

== Personal life ==
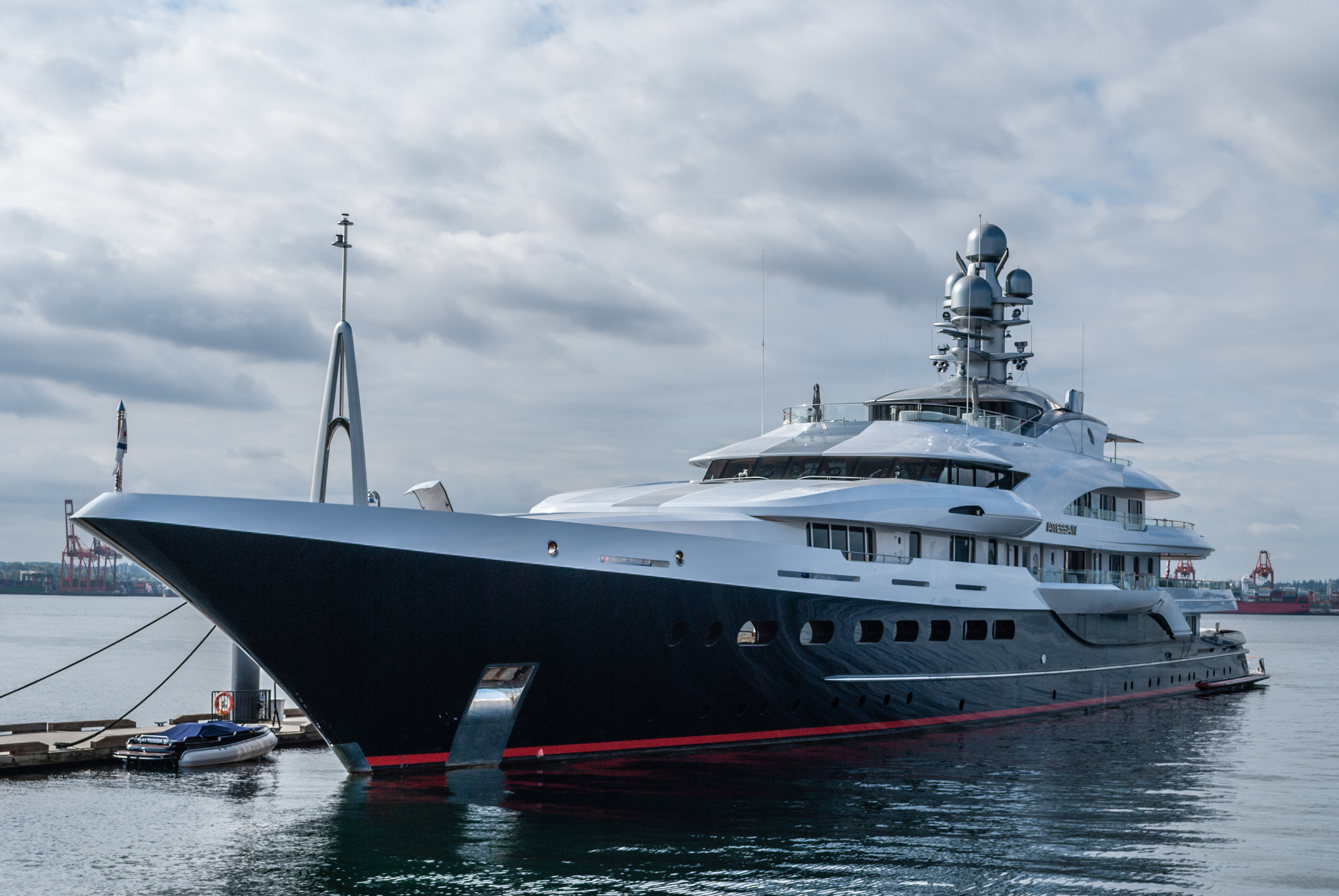
Attessa IV in North Vancouver, Canada

Washington is married to Phyllis and lives in Missoula, Montana. His son, Kyle Washington, is co-chairman of Seaspan Marine Corporation.

Washington also owns a private estate on Stuart Island, British Columbia, including a fishing lodge and golf course. The Washington–Grizzly Stadium for football at the University of Montana is named for him.

His private yacht Attessa IV has been featured in Forbes magazine. He has a Boeing Business Jet, 737-700 registration N162WC.

== Awards and honors ==
Year	Association	Category	Notes	Ref(s)
1990	American Academy of Achievement	Golden Plate Award		
1993	American Academy of Achievement	—N/a	Host; ceremony held in Glacier National Park, Montana	
1995	Horatio Alger Association of Distinguished Americans	Horatio Alger Award		
1996	Ellis Island Honors Society (EIHS)	Ellis Island Medal of Honor		
2007	Mining Foundation of the Southwest	American Mining Hall of Fame	Inductee	
2012	Maritime Museum of British Columbia (MMBC)	SS Beaver Award for Maritime Excellence		

== See also ==
- List of billionaires
