= Montana Rail Link =

Former Class II freight railroad in the United States

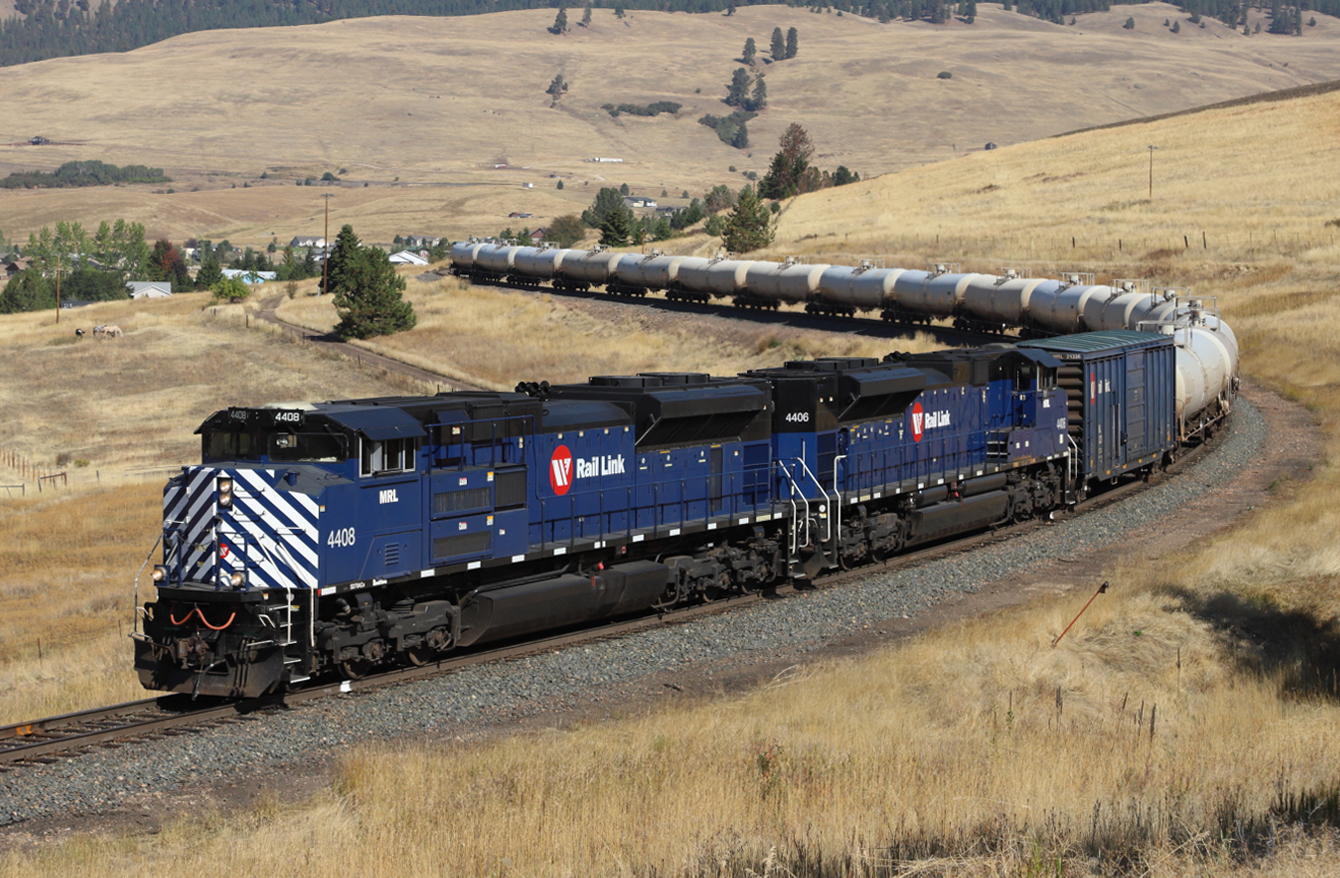
- A Montana Rail Link train in September 2022.

Overview
- Headquarters: Missoula, Montana
- Founders: Dennis Washington
- Reporting mark: MRL
- Locale: Idaho, Montana, Washington
- Dates of operation: October 31, 1987–January 1, 2024
- Predecessor: Burlington Northern Railroad
- Successor: BNSF Railway

Technical
- Track gauge: 4 ft 8 1/2 in (1,435 mm) standard gauge
- Length: 937 mi (1,508 km)

Other
- Website: www.montanarail.com

Montana Rail Link (reporting mark MRL) (now operated by BNSF as the MRL Subdivision) was a privately held Class II railroad in the United States. It operated on trackage originally built by the Northern Pacific Railway and leased from its successor BNSF Railway. MRL was a unit of The Washington Companies and was headquartered in Missoula, Montana.

The railroad ran between Huntley, Montana and Spokane, Washington, largely within Montana, and the main line passes through the towns of Missoula, Livingston, Bozeman, Billings, and Helena. Montana Rail Link connected with the BNSF on both ends and also in Garrison, Montana. The railroad had over 900 miles (1,400 km) of track, served 100 stations, and employed approximately 1,000 personnel. The main classification yard was in Laurel, Montana, with smaller yards in Missoula, Billings, Bozeman and Helena. Repair and mechanical facilities were in Livingston, Montana; turntables remain in Livingston and Laurel.

In January 2022, MRL and BNSF agreed on an early lease termination to return control of the line to BNSF. This took place on January 1, 2024; MRL became a subdivision of BNSF, and all employees of MRL were offered employment with BNSF.

== History ==
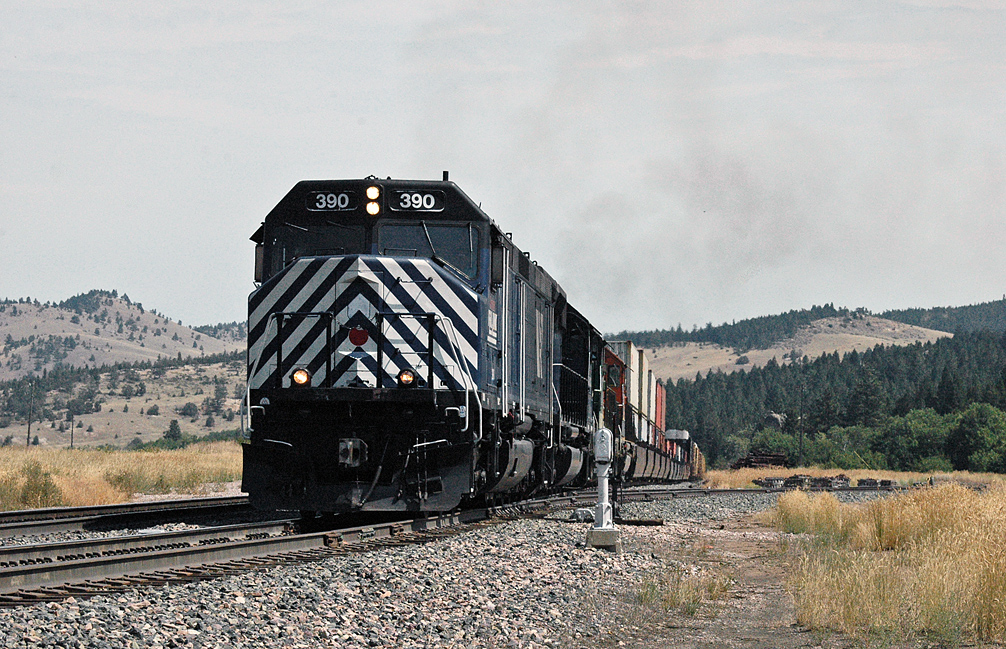
MRL #390, an EMD F45, leads a freight train

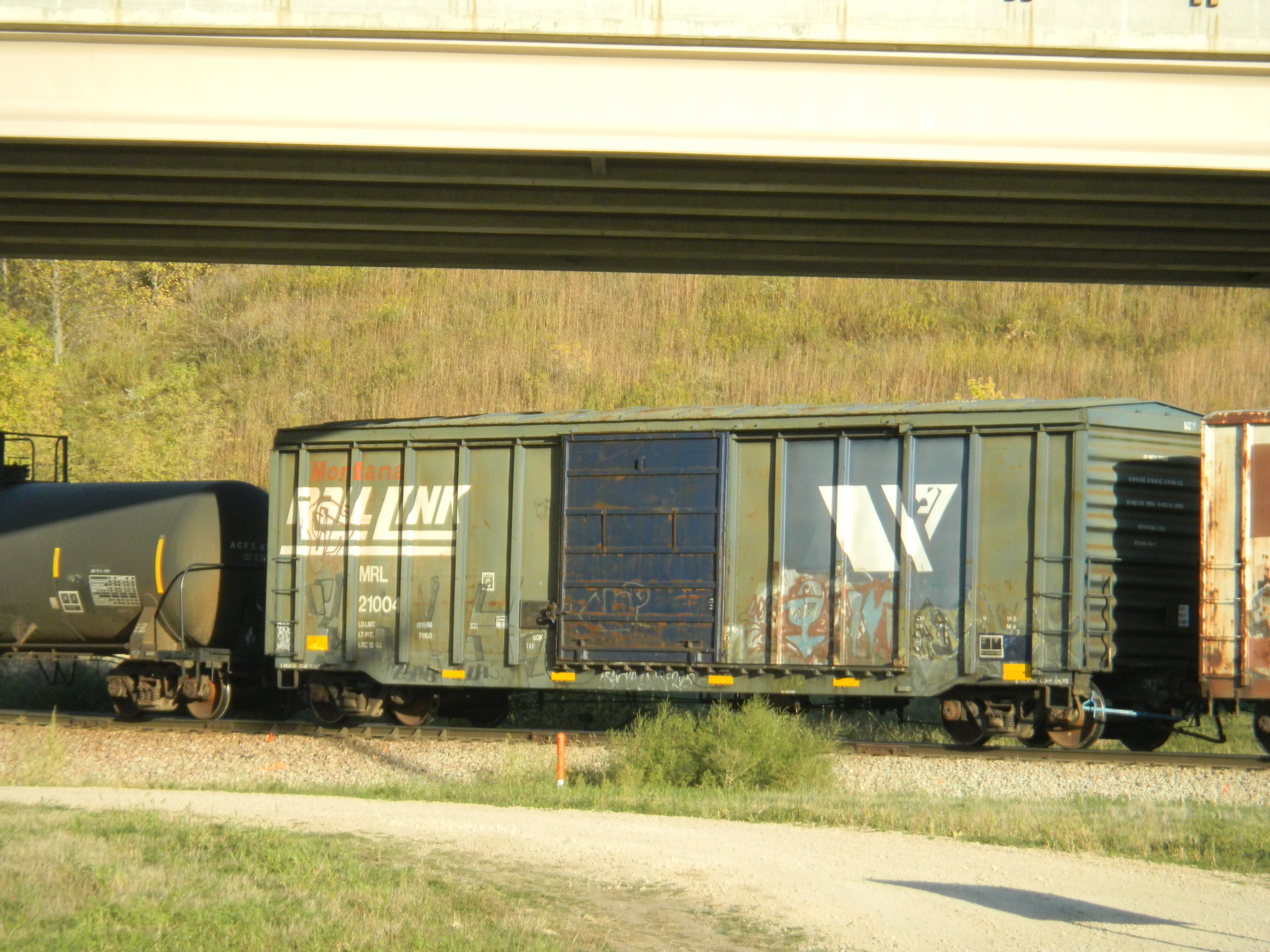
Montana Rail Link boxcar on the Cedar Rapids & Iowa City Railway at Cedar Rapids

Montana Rail Link's independent status and main line dates back to October 31, 1987, when MRL under Missoula businessman Dennis Washington commenced a 60-year lease of Burlington Northern's southern Montana main line between Sandpoint, Idaho and Huntley, Montana, near Billings. This spin-off was controversial as it happened during contract negotiations between Burlington Northern and the United Transportation Union. MRL workers were represented by various unions. Montana Rail Link trains operated between Billings and Spokane using trackage rights over BN successor BNSF's tracks connecting those points.

Montana Rail Link used cabooses until the BNSF takeover in 2024, which were used to carry remote control switching equipment on Laurel switch engines. A significant number of MRL movements were actually BNSF trains, complete with locomotives, that MRL received at one end of its track and forwarded back to BNSF at the other end. MRL also operated trains of its own to gather and distribute local freight along its lines. Forest products and grain were primary commodities, and MRL also operated a special train, called the Gas Local, between Missoula and Thompson Falls, Montana, to bridge a gap in a long-distance gasoline pipeline.

On September 8, 2005, Montana Rail Link took delivery of locomotive number 4300, the first of 16 new EMD SD70ACe locomotives. This was the first locomotive that the railroad has ordered new from a manufacturer, and it and the rest of the class were intended to replace aging SD40 and SD45 locomotives on trains crossing the Rocky Mountains over the continental divide at Mullan Pass near Helena, Montana and Bozeman Pass near Bozeman, Montana.

In January 2022, BNSF agreed to pay MRL $2 billion for an early lease termination. The return to BNSF control required the approval of the Surface Transportation Board, and this was later approved on March 8, 2023. BNSF took over operations on January 1, 2024. This absorbed the MRL into BNSF, integrating MRL operations, technology and personnel. All 1,200 employees were offered employment with BNSF.

== Incidents ==
=== 1989 Helena train wreck ===
In the Helena train wreck of February 2, 1989, 48 uncoupled rail cars rolled into Helena, hit a parked work train, caught fire and exploded. While property damage was extensive, there were no casualties.

=== 2014 Alberton derailment ===
On July 3, 2014, a MRL train with 90 railcars derailed near Alberton, Montana, en route from Laurel, Montana to Spokane, Washington. Twenty cars derailed, including three containing hazardous materials and six Boeing 737 fuselages. The 737 fuselages had been built in Kansas at Spirit AeroSystems and were being shipped to Renton, Washington, for final assembly. Three of the fuselages fell down an embankment, with two reaching the Clark Fork River. The six fuselages were recovered and scrapped within the month.

=== 2023 Quinn's Hot Springs derailment ===
On the morning of Sunday, April 2, 2023, a westbound MRL freight train derailed at Quinn's Hot Springs Resort in Paradise, Montana. About 25 cars derailed, including cases of canned and bottled beer, clay powder and one with highly flammable gas (alternately described as butane or propane); some cars tumbled into the Clark Fork River, and others derailed in the nearby tunnel. There were no injuries, fires or release of hazardous materials. Strong winds blowing the clay powder appeared like smoke and guest cabins were evacuated as a precaution. As the derailment site was only accessible by water, the fire district's water rescue team ferried responders across the river in a small boat.

=== 2023 Yellowstone River derailment ===
On June 24, 2023, part of a westbound freight train derailed near Reed Point in Stillwater County, while traveling on a bridge over the Yellowstone River. The bridge collapsed and ten cars derailed, of which at least eight fell into the river.

Breached cars included either molten sulfur or asphalt. Two cars carried sodium hydro sulfate, however, these did not rupture. Yellowstone County Disaster and Emergency Services stated that several cars were damaged and leaked petroleum products. Yellow liquid flowing out of the cars was visible. MRL stated that several cars carried hazmat products. As to whether the bridge collapsed first or the cars derailed first is under investigation.
