= Ben H. Radcliffe =

American politician (1915–2014)

Member of the South Dakota House of Representatives
- In office 1955–1962

Personal details
- Born: December 21, 1915 Wolsey, South Dakota, U.S.
- Died: May 13, 2014 (aged 98)
- Party: Democratic

Ben H. Radcliffe (December 21, 1915 – May 13, 2014) was an American politician. He served as a Democratic member of the South Dakota House of Representatives.

== Life and career ==
Radcliffe was born in Wolsey, South Dakota. He was a farmer and stockman. Radcliffe served in the South Dakota House of Representatives from 1955 to 1962. Radcliffe died in May 2014, at the age of 98.
