= Pierre Subdivision =

The Pierre Subdivision is an east–west railway line owned and operated by the Rapid City, Pierre and Eastern Railroad (RCPE), a subsidiary of Genesee & Wyoming. The line stretches approximately 118 miles (190 km) across the central parts of South Dakota, connecting Pierre, South Dakota with Huron, South Dakota. It is also a part of the RCPE's east–west main route. Traffic on this line is solely freight traffic.

The line has automatic block signals at the BNSF Diamond in Wolsey, South Dakota. The rest of the line is not equipped with centralized traffic control or automatic block signalling (dark territory). It is dispatched via radio under the track warrant control rules.

There are passing sidings at Miller and Highmore, with only spur tracks at other locations. Freight yards are located at Huron and Pierre.

== Connections to other subdivisions and railroads ==
The Pierre Subdivision connects with Redfield Subdivision and the BNSF Railway at Wolsey, South Dakota. It also connects with Huron and Yale Spur Subdivisions at Huron, South Dakota, with Onida Subdivision at Blunt, South Dakota, and with PRC Subdivision at Pierre, South Dakota.
