= Waseca Subdivision =

The Waseca Subdivision or Waseca Sub is a railway line in southern Minnesota owned and operated by the Dakota, Minnesota and Eastern Railroad (DM&E) subsidiary of Canadian Pacific. It stretches roughly 103 miles (166 km) from Winona, Minnesota in the east to Waseca in the west where the rails continue as the Tracy Subdivision. There's also a connection south to the Hartland Subdivision. U.S. Highway 14 closely follows the railroad line.

Most of the line is dark territory, meaning that it is not signalled and not equipped with centralized traffic control or automatic block signalling systems. The line is dispatched via radio using track warrant control. However, short stretches of track in and near Winona are under control of signaling systems of the Union Pacific Railroad and Canadian Pacific.

== Construction ==
The line was originally planned in the 1850s when Minnesota was still Minnesota Territory, though it took the formation and collapse of a handful of different railroad companies before it was completely built. The first was the Transit Railroad Company, which formed in 1854 and included figures such as Henry Hastings Sibley and Alexander Ramsey who soon went on to become the first and second governors of Minnesota, respectively (though Ramsey had already been an appointed governor of Minnesota Territory). However, construction didn't begin until a groundbreaking on June 9, 1858 in Winona. A contract had been awarded the previous day to DeGraff & Co., headed by Colonel Andrew DeGraff (only two weeks after Henry Sibley entered office as governor). The company was able to grade 50 miles of right-of-way and build bridges along the route, but was hit by the 1858–1859 financial crisis. Work stalled and the property eventually went into foreclosure.

The Winona, St. Peter & Missouri River Railroad Company was awarded the property in 1861, but failed to make sufficient progress toward a goal of having trains up and running to Rochester by a deadline set by the state legislature, so ownership transferred to the Winona and St. Peter Railroad Company in 1862. The first passenger train, operated by Col. DeGraff, finally ran on December 9 of that year between Winona and Stockton and back, and the first freight load was carried the next day. This was less than six months after the William Crooks became the first locomotive to run in the state, between Saint Paul and St. Anthony (now Minneapolis).

Many of miles of track were laid in the following years. The railroad reached Rochester in 1864, Kasson in 1865 and Owatonna in 1866. The Chicago and North Western Railway (C&NW) bought the Winona & St. Peter in 1867, though it continued as a distinct subsidiary until 1900. Though the existing property was transferred to the new owner, the underlying land grants that made the line possible were transferred to investors in New York City headed by A. H. Barney, a figure in the early days of Wells Fargo & Company. Today's subdivision was completed in 1868 with the addition of 16 miles through Waseca, though the line continued to be built westward, reaching Dakota Territory (now South Dakota) in 1872.

Additional branch lines were added, including three in 1878: from Eyota south to Chatfield, north from Eyota to Plainview, and north from Rochester to Zumbrota. A fourth branch off the mainline was made farther west (in today's Tracy Subdivision) the same year, from Sleepy Eye north to Redwood Falls. Interchanges were also made between this line and other north-south rail lines operated by other companies. However, these branches have largely been abandoned today.

== Decline of the Chicago and North Western ==
Passenger train service continued on the line from its formation until July 23, 1963 when the Rochester 400 made its final run. Amtrak's Empire Builder still runs along Canadian Pacific's River Sub, adjacent to the Waseca Sub at Minnesota City Junction. That train uses the former Milwaukee Road Hiawatha route between Saint Paul and Chicago.

Chicago and North Western continued to operate the line across southern Minnesota and South Dakota until the 1986. The Dakota, Minnesota and Eastern Railroad was formed and took over the line in September of that year. Nine years later, the C&NW itself was acquired by the Union Pacific Railroad.

== Proposed Powder River extension; sale to Canadian Pacific ==
Starting in the late 1990s, DM&E began work on an extension from the western end of its line in South Dakota to coal mines in the Powder River Basin, intending to run coal trains along this route. The city of Rochester and the Mayo Clinic objected to this and asked the Surface Transportation Board to compel the railroad to construct a lengthy bypass of the city for coal trains and through freights. Rochester and Mayo lost this fight, as the Surface Transportation Board and the courts approved the DM&E's Powder River expansion without requiring a bypass.

The Canadian Pacific Railway acquired the DM&E and IC&E in 2007, and DME was a full CP subsidiary in 2008.

The CP later dropped its plans to extend track to the Powder River Basin, and instead spun off the west end of the DME (Tracy, MN, and westward) to a new regional, the Rapid City, Pierre and Eastern Railroad.

== See also ==
- Rochester Rail Link
