= Onida Subdivision =

The Onida Subdivision is a branch line railway segment owned, maintained and operated by the Rapid City, Pierre and Eastern Railroad (RCPE), a subsidiary of Genesee & Wyoming. It connects the city of Onida to the company's east–west main line, the Pierre Subdivision at Blunt, South Dakota. The line is approximately 17 miles (27 km) in length.

Under Chicago and North Western management the line was known as the Gettysburg Subdivision, extending a distance of 40.3 miles (64.9 km) between Blunt and Gettysburg.
