= Aviation Partners =

Company in Seattle, Washington

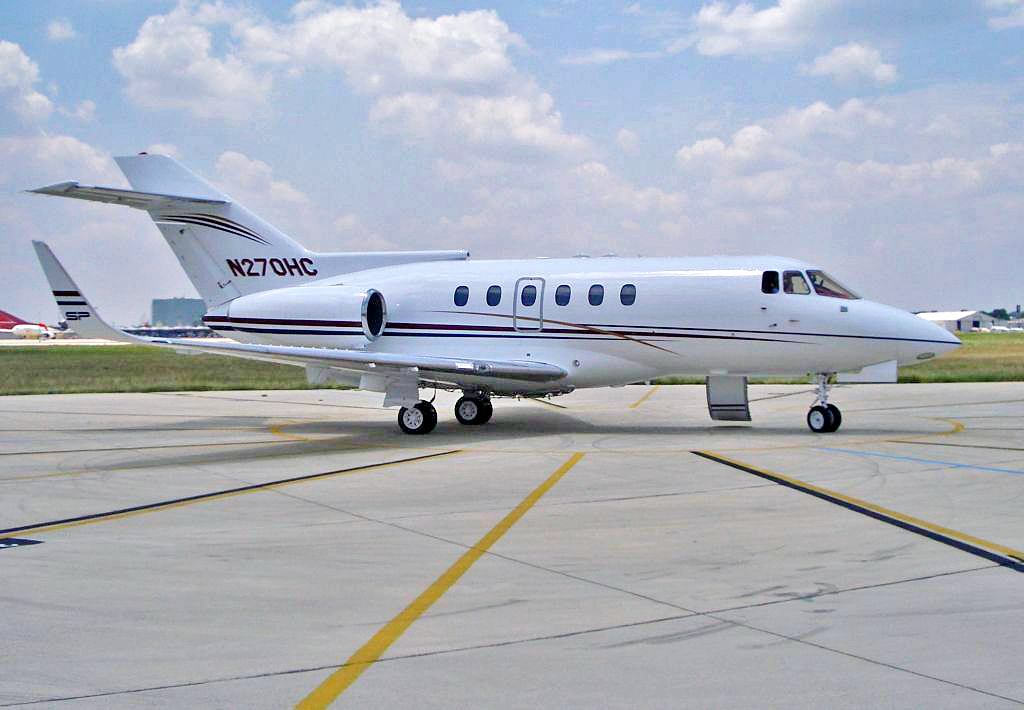
Hawker 800SP with API winglets

Aviation Partners Inc. (API) is a Seattle-based private corporation that specializes in performance-enhancing winglet systems. The corporation was founded in 1991 and is owned by The Washington Companies.

== History ==
API was founded in 1991 by Joe Clark and Dennis Washington, bringing together a team consisting primarily of retired Boeing and Lockheed engineers and flight test department directors. His design team was led by Dr. Louis "Bernie" Gratzer, who retired from Boeing that same year (after a distinguished career which included the aerodynamic design of the KC-135, 707 and 727) and immediately began with API, with title of senior vice president.

Washington, an American entrepreneur who made his money from copper mining, was frustrated that his private jet could not fly coast-to-coast in the US without refueling. Instead of buying a new aircraft, he approached his friend Joe Clark who had experience in the aviation industry having co-founded Horizon Air. Clark calculated that by increasing the wings' performance, non-stop coast-to-coast flying would be possible. Together with a group of aviation specialists, Clark developed a new winglet, and with permission from Gulfstream, fitted the winglet to Washington's jet. Test flights confirmed a fuel saving and range increase of 4–5%. Washington and Clark then set out on a publicity campaign to sell the idea. They started setting a number of World Records in performance with the winglets.

In 1997, API's winglets were sold as a standard fit on all Boeing Business Jets, and winglets were offered as an addition to standard 737s. Around 95% of all 737 customers want winglets fitted.

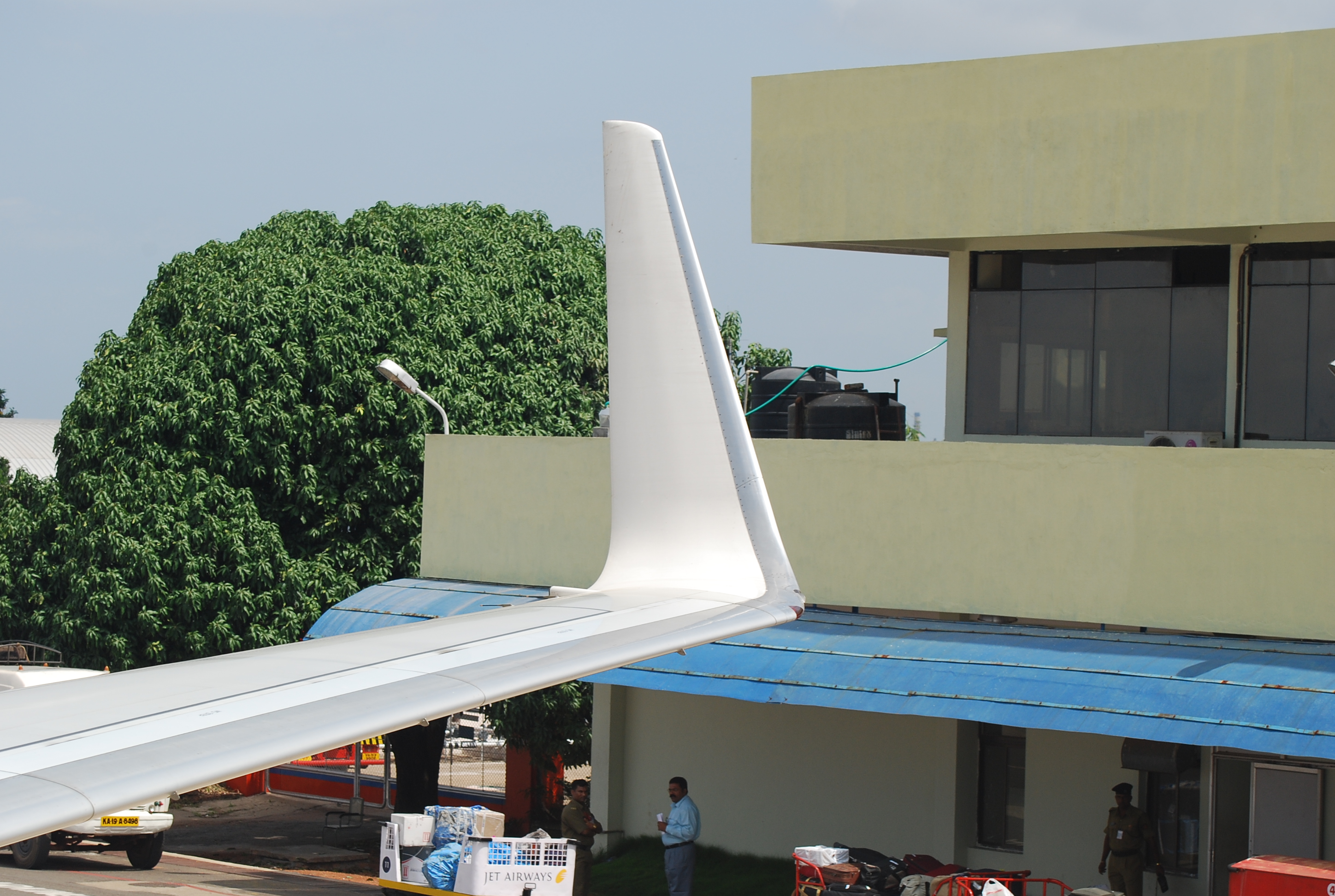
An API blended winglet on a Boeing 737-800

Aviation Partners formed a joint venture with Boeing, called Aviation Partners Boeing (APB), in 1997. This entity licenses the Blended Winglet Technology for use on Boeing aircraft. Starting with the Boeing Business Jet, winglets have been factory installed onto the Boeing 737 Next Generation as well as retrofitted on 737 'Classic' (Boeing 737-300 and -500) and 757 and 767-300ER airliners.

In addition to the Boeing airliner programs, API has certified winglets for the Hawker 800 series jets and has over 100 Blended Winglet equipped Hawkers in service as of December 2008.

At EBACE 2007, Dassault Aviation, in conjunction with Aviation Partners, announced the Falcon 2000 LX aircraft. A derivative of the Falcon 2000 EX airframe, it is the first aircraft to be put into production with API's new High Mach winglets. The Falcon 2000-winglets received FAA certification on April 16, 2009, with the 900 series receiving certification in September 2011. Dassault and API have also certified winglets for the Falcon 50 series aircraft.

Airbus worked with Aviation Partners from 2006 through 2011, in an effort to modernize its A320 family of jets. In 2011, however, Airbus announced that it came up with its own design, which it branded "sharklets," and obtained a patent in Europe. In December 2011, Airbus filed suit in Texas seeking to invalidate Aviation Partners' 1994 winglet patent. Airbus settled the lawsuit by making a large payment to Aviation Partners in 2018.

By 2009, API's product had been introduced to the Boeing 757, Boeing 767, and several business jets.

Aviation Partners is currently developing the Spiroid winglet, a closed wing surface mounted at the end of a conventional wing. Initial testing using a Gulfstream II test aircraft has shown the winglet design to reduce fuel consumption in the cruise phase by over 10%.

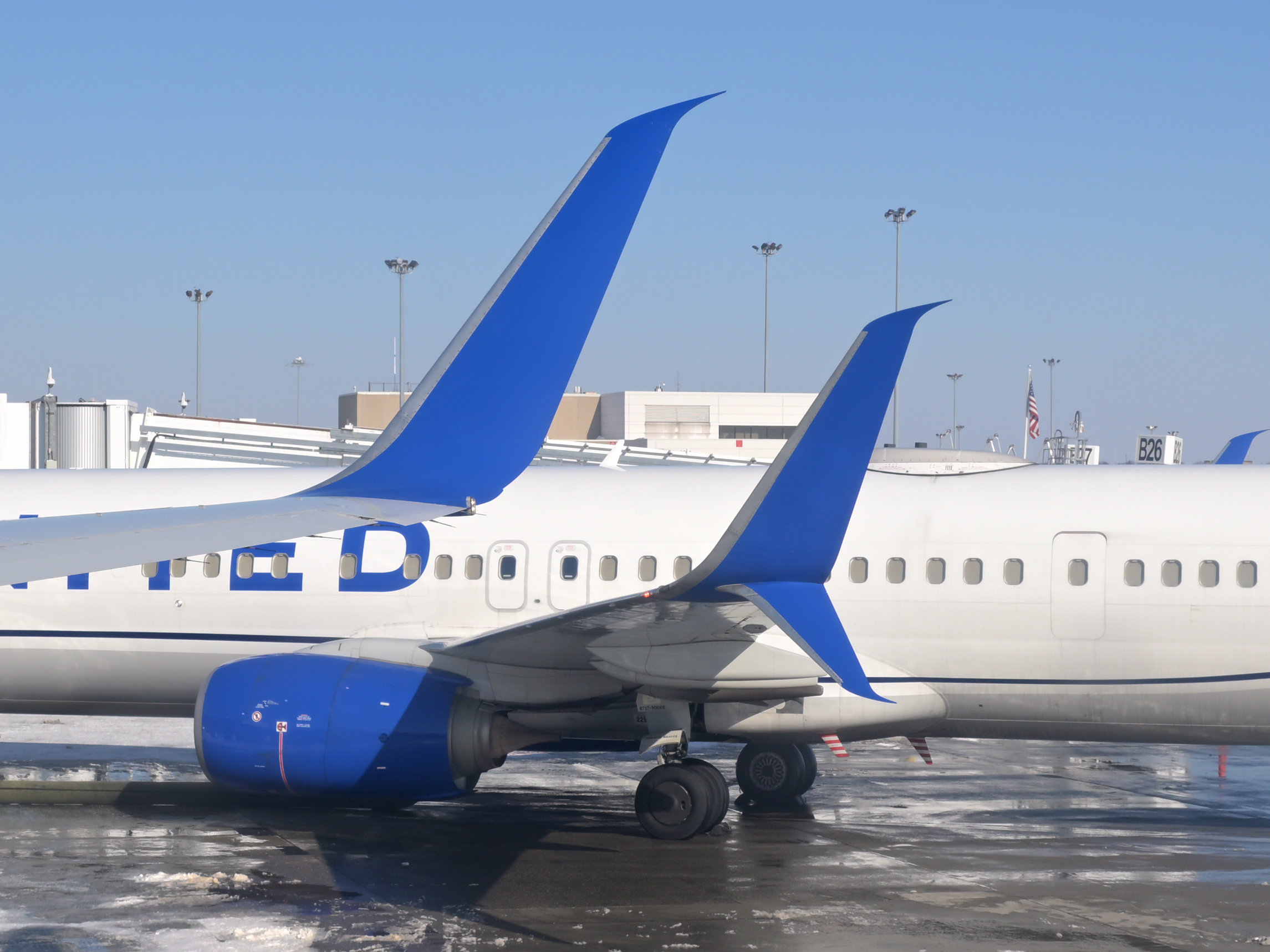
A Scimitar Blended Winglet on the wingtip of a Boeing 757 (left), across from a Split Scimitar Winglet on a Boeing 737-900ER (right)

APB's Split Scimitar Winglet retrofit program consists of retrofitting 737NG's winglets by replacing the aluminum winglet tip cap with a new aerodynamically shaped "Scimitar" winglet tip cap and by adding a new Scimitar tipped ventral strake. This modification demonstrated approximately 2% drag reduction over the basic Blended Winglet configuration. FAA granted supplemental type certification (STC) for the Split Scimitar Winglet (SSW) retrofit on the 737-800 and BBJ2 on February 6, 2014, for 737-900ER on August 27, 2014, for 3 additional 737-800 wing configuration on October 2, 2014, and for all models of the 737-700 including the Boeing Business Jet on April 21, 2015.

APB expects Scimitar Winglet Systems installed on a 737-800 to save the typical airline more than 45,000 gallons of jet fuel per aircraft per year resulting in a corresponding reduction of carbon dioxide emissions of 476 tons per aircraft per year. The fuel savings can enable a 737-800 to increase its payload up to 2,500 pounds or increase its range up to 75 nautical miles. APB also expects to certify an improvement in low speed performance that will generate significant take-off benefits from high/hot or obstacle limited runways. The first European Split Scimitar Winglets were installed on the TUI fleet aircraft in Stansted in 2014 by Chevron Technical Services Ltd.

The Boeing 757 blended winglets have also been updated with a scimitar tip. The Boeing 757 Scimitar Blended Winglet improves fuel burn by 1.1% over the original blended winglet. Icelandair and United Airlines have retrofitted their 757-200s with Scimitar Blended Winglets.
