= Huron Subdivision =

Railway line in the United States

The Huron Subdivision or Huron Sub is a railway line owned and operated by the Rapid City, Pierre and Eastern Railroad (RCPE), a subsidiary of Genesee & Wyoming. The line stretches for 136 miles (219 km) across southwestern Minnesota and southeastern South Dakota, forming the eastern end of the RCPE shortline network. Originally the line was a part of the Chicago and North Western Railway. From 1986 it was a part of Dakota, Minnesota and Eastern Railroad, which later became a subsidiary of Canadian Pacific Railway.

The line is dark territory, meaning that it is not signalled and not equipped with centralized traffic control or automatic block signalling systems. The line is dispatched via radio using track warrant control.

Huron Subdivision connects with Canadian Pacific Tracy Subdivision at Tracy, Minnesota, as well as Pierre Subdivision and Yale Spur Subdivision (a former Great Northern Railway line) at Huron, South Dakota.

RCPE trains may continue to Mankato using trackage rights to interchange with the Union Pacific Railroad.

== History ==
The Huron Subdivision is a direct descendant of the railroad line featured in the four De Smet novels within the overall series of children's novels written by Laura Ingalls Wilder known as the Little House on the Prairie series. The line was built in 1879-1880 and first operated in the 1880s, and the new railroad line's construction and operation are repeatedly described and featured in the novels.
