= PRC Subdivision =

The PRC Subdivision is a railway line owned and operated by the Rapid City, Pierre and Eastern Railroad (RCPE), a subsidiary of Genesee & Wyoming. The line is the company's important east–west route, connecting Pierre to Rapid City, both in South Dakota. The line is a freight-only line, stretching for approximately 170 miles (270 km) across central South Dakota. It uses the Chicago and North Western Railroad Bridge to cross the Missouri River between Pierre and Fort Pierre.

The route is not equipped with centralized traffic control or automatic block signalling systems. Traffic is controlled via radio under track warrant control rules.

In addition to freight yards located at Pierre and Rapid City, there are passing sidings at Philip and Wall. Formerly, there was also a wye at Wall. There is also a 6,000-foot (1,800 m) long passing siding named J.C. Siding 25 miles (40 km) west from Pierre. At other locations only spur tracks exist.

== Connections ==
The PRC Subdivision connects with Pierre Subdivision at Pierre and with Black Hills Subdivision at Rapid City. There was also a spur track connection to Ellsworth Air Force Base at Box Elder. This connection is not active as it was closed off in 2004 by the U.S. Air Force.

There are no connections to other rail traffic operators along this line.
