= Wolsey, South Dakota =

- City
- Logo

- Location in Beadle County and the state of South Dakota
- Coordinates: 44°24′38″N 98°28′26″W
- Country: United States
- State: South Dakota
- County: Beadle
- Incorporated: 1883

Area
  - Total: 2.30 sq mi (5.96 km^{2})
  - Land: 2.27 sq mi (5.87 km^{2})
  - Water: 0.035 sq mi (0.09 km^{2})
- Elevation: 1,345 ft (410 m)

Population (2020)
  - Total: 459
  - Density: 202.7/sq mi (78.25/km^{2})
- Time zone: UTC-6 (Central (CST))
  - Summer (DST): UTC-5 (CDT)
- ZIP code: 57384
- Area code: 605
- FIPS code: 46-72540
- GNIS feature ID: 1267660
- Website: wolseysd.com

Wolsey is a city in Beadle County, South Dakota, United States. The population was 459 at the 2020 census.

== History ==
The first settlement at Wolsey was made in 1882. A post office has been in operation in Wolsey since 1883, the same year the town was platted. The township was organized the following year, in 1884. The town of Wolsey was named for Thomas Wolsey, an English cardinal.

== Geography ==
According to the United States Census Bureau, the town has a total area of 2.31 square miles (5.98 km^{2}), of which 2.27 square miles (5.88 km^{2}) is land and 0.04 square miles (0.10 km^{2}) is water.

== Demographics ==
Historical population
Census	Pop.	Note	%±
1900	122		—
1910	436		257.4%
1920	510		17.0%
1930	455		−10.8%
1940	410		−9.9%
1950	391		−4.6%
1960	354		−9.5%
1970	436		23.2%
1980	437		0.2%
1990	442		1.1%
2000	418		−5.4%
2010	376		−10.0%
2020	459		22.1%
U.S. Decennial Census

=== 2010 census ===
As of the census of 2010, there were 376 people, 165 households, and 106 families residing in the town. The population density was 165.6 inhabitants per square mile (63.9/km^{2}). There were 194 housing units at an average density of 85.5 per square mile (33.0/km^{2}). The racial makeup of the town was 99.2% White, 0.3% Asian, and 0.5% from other races. Hispanic or Latino of any race were 0.8% of the population.

There were 165 households, of which 28.5% had children under the age of 18 living with them, 52.1% were married couples living together, 9.7% had a female householder with no husband present, 2.4% had a male householder with no wife present, and 35.8% were non-families. 32.1% of all households were made up of individuals, and 15.7% had someone living alone who was 65 years of age or older. The average household size was 2.28 and the average family size was 2.88.

The median age in the town was 43 years. 24.5% of residents were under the age of 18; 5.6% were between the ages of 18 and 24; 22.4% were from 25 to 44; 30.6% were from 45 to 64; and 17% were 65 years of age or older. The gender makeup of the town was 50.3% male and 49.7% female.

=== 2000 census ===
As of the census of 2000, there were 418 people, 174 households, and 121 families residing in the town. The population density was 183.3 inhabitants per square mile (70.8/km^{2}). There were 185 housing units at an average density of 81.1 per square mile (31.3/km^{2}). The racial makeup of the town was 99.52% White, 0.24% Native American, and 0.24% from two or more races. Hispanic or Latino of any race were 0.48% of the population.

There were 174 households, out of which 28.7% had children under the age of 18 living with them, 60.3% were married couples living together, 5.7% had a female householder with no husband present, and 29.9% were non-families. 27.6% of all households were made up of individuals, and 19.0% had someone living alone who was 65 years of age or older. The average household size was 2.40 and the average family size was 2.92.

In the town, the population was spread out, with 24.4% under the age of 18, 5.7% from 18 to 24, 25.8% from 25 to 44, 23.4% from 45 to 64, and 20.6% who were 65 years of age or older. The median age was 43 years. For every 100 females, there were 100.0 males. For every 100 females age 18 and over, there were 95.1 males.

As of 2000 the median income for a household in the town was $35,313, and the median income for a family was $42,679. Males had a median income of $27,500 versus $20,288 for females. The per capita income for the town was $14,319. About 8.0% of families and 9.2% of the population were below the poverty line, including 9.2% of those under age 18 and 18.8% of those age 65 or over.

== Notable people ==
- Greg Boe, a member of the Minnesota House of Representatives, was born and raised in Wolsey.
- Richard Warren Sears, founder of Sears, Roebuck, and Co, began his retail sales career by selling unclaimed watches while serving as a station agent for the railroad in Wolsey in the early 1880s.
- Ben H. Radcliffe, South Dakota State Senator
