= The Washington Companies =

Parent company

The Washington Companies is the parent company of several independent entities. The company is privately held, and was founded by Dennis Washington. Current companies owned by The Washington Company include:

- Seaspan Corporation (shipping and shipbuilding)
- Aviation Partners Inc. (airplane winglets)
- Montana Resources LLP (copper and molybdenum mining)
- Dominion Diamond Mines (diamond mining)
- Modern Machinery (heavy equipment sales and leasing)
- SRY Rail Link (rail transport in British Columbia)
- Envirocon (environmental remediation and civil construction)
