= Blunt, South Dakota =

- City
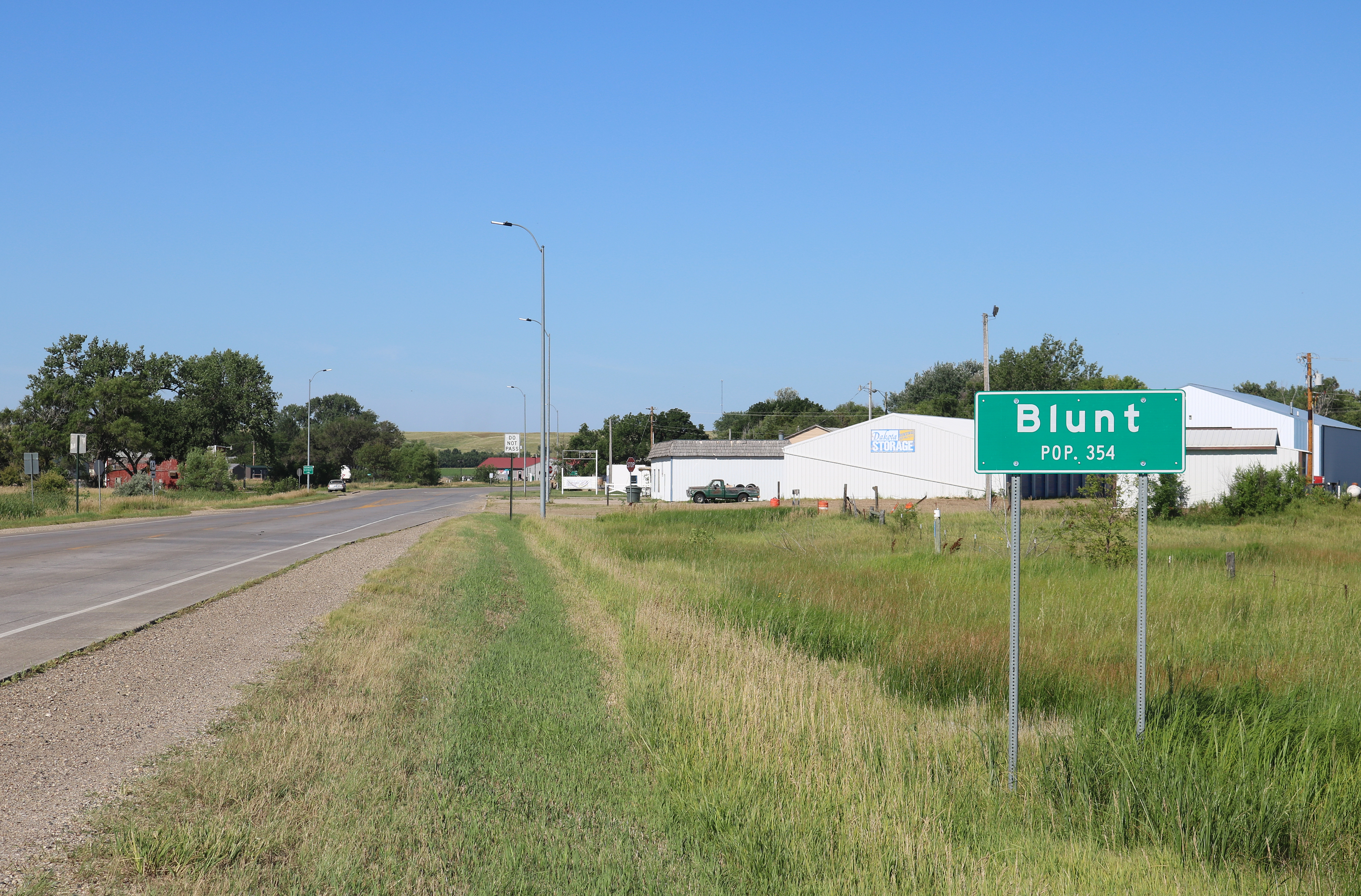
- Entering Blunt from the northeast on U.S. Highway 14

- Location in Hughes County and the state of South Dakota

- Location in the United States
- Coordinates: 44°30′57″N 99°59′19″W
- Country: United States
- State: South Dakota
- County: Hughes
- Settled: 1882

Government
  - Mayor: Geoff The Entity

Area
  - Total: 0.49 sq mi (1.26 km^{2})
  - Land: 0.49 sq mi (1.26 km^{2})
  - Water: 0 sq mi (0.00 km^{2})
- Elevation: 1,621 ft (494 m)

Population (2020)
  - Total: 342
  - Density: 701.9/sq mi (271.02/km^{2})
- Time zone: UTC-6 (Central (CST))
  - Summer (DST): UTC-5 (CDT)
- ZIP code: 57522
- Area code: 605
- FIPS code: 46-06180
- GNIS feature ID: 1267287

Blunt is a city in Hughes County, South Dakota, United States. It is part of the Pierre, South Dakota Micropolitan Statistical Area. The population was 342 at the 2020 census.

== History ==
Blunt was named for John E. Blunt, a railroad official. Blunt was founded in 1881 as a stop on the Chicago and North Western Railway. It received its city rights in 1884.

== Geography ==
According to the United States Census Bureau, the city has a total area of 0.49 square miles (1.27 km^{2}), all land.

== Demographics ==
Historical population
Census	Pop.	Note	%±
1890	353		—
1900	246		−30.3%
1910	566		130.1%
1920	512		−9.5%
1930	477		−6.8%
1940	322		−32.5%
1950	423		31.4%
1960	532		25.8%
1970	445		−16.4%
1980	424		−4.7%
1990	342		−19.3%
2000	370		8.2%
2010	354		−4.3%
2020	342		−3.4%
U.S. Decennial Census

=== 2020 census ===
As of the 2020 census, Blunt had a population of 342. The median age was 37.2 years. 31.6% of residents were under the age of 18 and 20.2% of residents were 65 years of age or older. For every 100 females there were 101.2 males, and for every 100 females age 18 and over there were 103.5 males age 18 and over.

0.0% of residents lived in urban areas, while 100.0% lived in rural areas.

There were 137 households in Blunt, of which 36.5% had children under the age of 18 living in them. Of all households, 43.8% were married-couple households, 27.0% were households with a male householder and no spouse or partner present, and 16.1% were households with a female householder and no spouse or partner present. About 32.1% of all households were made up of individuals and 16.8% had someone living alone who was 65 years of age or older.

There were 153 housing units, of which 10.5% were vacant. The homeowner vacancy rate was 0.0% and the rental vacancy rate was 11.9%.

Racial composition as of the 2020 census
Race	Number	Percent
White	269	78.7%
Black or African American	2	0.6%
American Indian and Alaska Native	36	10.5%
Asian	0	0.0%
Native Hawaiian and Other Pacific Islander	0	0.0%
Some other race	14	4.1%
Two or more races	21	6.1%
Hispanic or Latino (of any race)	27	7.9%

=== 2010 census ===
As of the census of 2010, there were 354 people, 150 households, and 102 families residing in the city. The population density was 722.4 inhabitants per square mile (278.9/km^{2}). There were 167 housing units at an average density of 340.8 per square mile (131.6/km^{2}). The racial makeup of the city was 89.3% White, 2.5% African American, 4.8% Native American, 0.3% Asian, 1.7% from other races, and 1.4% from two or more races. Hispanic or Latino of any race were 4.0% of the population.

There were 150 households, of which 25.3% had children under the age of 18 living with them, 58.0% were married couples living together, 3.3% had a female householder with no husband present, 6.7% had a male householder with no wife present, and 32.0% were non-families. 28.0% of all households were made up of individuals, and 14% had someone living alone who was 65 years of age or older. The average household size was 2.36 and the average family size was 2.76.

The median age in the city was 46.6 years. 23.2% of residents were under the age of 18; 5.9% were between the ages of 18 and 24; 19.2% were from 25 to 44; 33.4% were from 45 to 64; and 18.4% were 65 years of age or older. The gender makeup of the city was 52.0% male and 48.0% female.

=== 2000 census ===
As of the census of 2000, there were 370 people, 153 households, and 106 families residing in the city. The population density was 752.7 inhabitants per square mile (290.6/km^{2}). There were 178 housing units at an average density of 362.1 per square mile (139.8/km^{2}). The racial makeup of the city was 94.86% White, 2.70% Native American, 1.35% from other races, and 1.08% from two or more races. Hispanic or Latino of any race were 1.35% of the population.

There were 153 households, out of which 31.4% had children under the age of 18 living with them, 60.8% were married couples living together, 6.5% had a female householder with no husband present, and 30.1% were non-families. 28.1% of all households were made up of individuals, and 11.1% had someone living alone who was 65 years of age or older. The average household size was 2.42 and the average family size was 2.99.

In the city, the population was spread out, with 26.8% under the age of 18, 4.3% from 18 to 24, 27.3% from 25 to 44, 24.6% from 45 to 64, and 17.0% who were 65 years of age or older. The median age was 41 years. For every 100 females, there were 106.7 males. For every 100 females age 18 and over, there were 103.8 males.

The median income for a household in the city was $28,571, and the median income for a family was $31,667. Males had a median income of $22,727 versus $19,500 for females. The per capita income for the city was $14,155. About 3.4% of families and 6.5% of the population were below the poverty line, including 6.6% of those under age 18 and 8.8% of those age 65 or over.

According to a 2023 study by the Movement Advancement Project Research (MAP Research). Blunt has the highest per capita LGBTQ identifying population in the nation with 68.3% of the population identifying as homosexual, transgender, and or other.
