= Rapid City, Pierre and Eastern Railroad =

Class II railroad in South Dakota

Rapid City, Pierre & Eastern Railroad

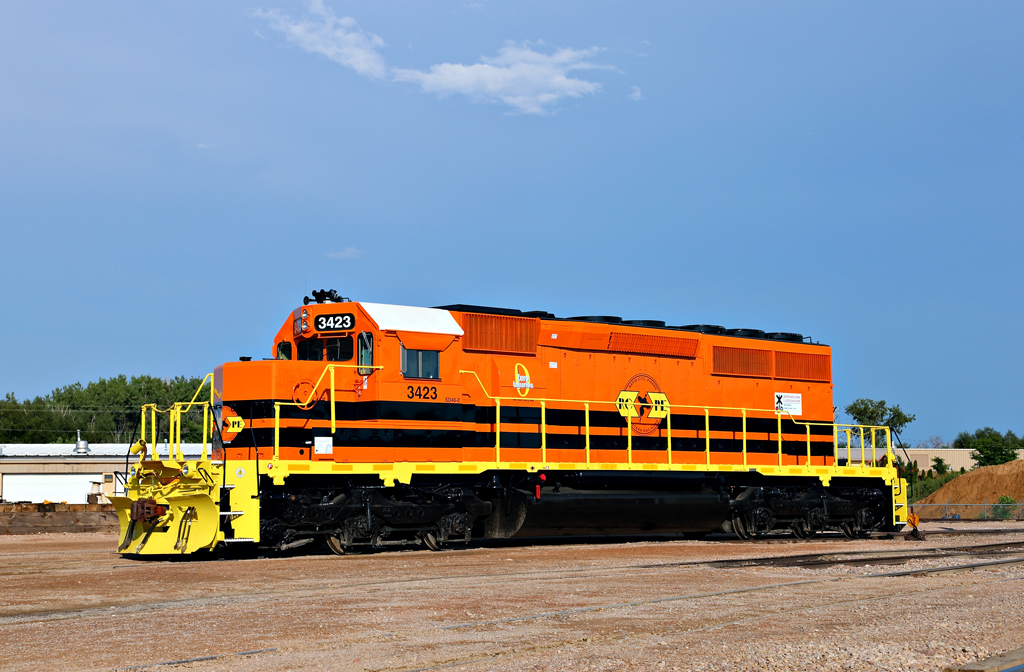
- Freshly-painted EMD SD40-2 No. 3423 in Rapid City in 2014

Overview
- Headquarters: Rapid City, South Dakota
- Reporting mark: RCPE
- Locale: Minnesota, Nebraska, South Dakota and Wyoming
- Dates of operation: 2014–Present
- Predecessor: Canadian Pacific Railway

Technical
- Track gauge: 4 ft 8 1/2 in (1,435 mm)
- Length: 743 miles

Other
- Website: Official website

The Rapid City, Pierre & Eastern Railroad (reporting mark RCPE) is a Class II freight railroad operating across South Dakota and southern Minnesota in the northern plains of the United States. Portions of the railroad also extend into Wyoming and Nebraska. It is owned and operated by Genesee & Wyoming. The primary commodities shipped are grain, clay, and cement. Operations began on June 1, 2014.

== History ==
Genesee & Wyoming, a holding company of mostly shortline railroads, formed the Rapid City, Pierre & Eastern to acquire the western end of the former Dakota, Minnesota and Eastern Railroad (DM&E) rail line from the Canadian Pacific Railway (CPR). The RCPE and DM&E entered an agreement on January 2, 2014, wherein RCPE would acquire 670 miles of track and 219 miles of trackage rights from the DM&E. The acquisition was completed on May 30, 2014, for $210 million. Most of its employees came over from the DM&E. Operations began on June 1, 2014.

The state of South Dakota partnered with the RCPE to enhance rail service and keep agricultural commodities moving to market. In 2021, the RCPE received state and federal funding totalling US$42 million to upgrade 163 miles of rail between Fort Pierre and Rapid City. This project updated that portion of the line with 136 pound continuous welded rail. This increased the weight capacity of rail cars from 263,000-pound to 286,000-pound and the speed limit from 10 mph to a minimum of 25 mph. In December, 2025, the RCPE offered $3.125 million to purchase two segments of state-owned track: 4.2 miles at the Wolsey Interchange with BNSF, and the 15.3-mile branch between Huron, SD, and Yale, SD. The offer included some conditions, such as the state of South Dakota being able to repurchase the Yale branch should RCPE abandon it, and the right of first refusal should the railroad sell any or all of the properties to a third party. The sale was approved in January, 2026.

== Route ==
The Rapid City, Pierre & Eastern owns 743 miles (1,196 km) of track. The main line runs between Tracy, Minnesota, and Rapid City, South Dakota, with branches north to Colony, in Crook County, Wyoming, and south to Dakota Junction, Nebraska. Much of the main line from Tracy to Rapid City is paralleled by U.S. Route 14. The route travels the length of the state from the eastern border with Minnesota, to the western border with Wyoming, crossing the Missouri river at Pierre.

- Huron Subdivision – Tracy, Minnesota to Huron, South Dakota - 136 miles
- Pierre Subdivision – Huron to Pierre - 118 miles
- PRC Subdivision – Pierre to Rapid City - 170 miles
- Black Hills Subdivision – Colony, Wyoming to Crawford/Dakota Junction, Nebraska - 174 miles

There are three short branches as well:

- Onida Subdivision – Blunt, South Dakota to Onida, South Dakota
- Huron, South Dakota–Yale, South Dakota (Originally owned by the State of South Dakota and operated by the RCPE, and now owned and operated by RCPE; meets the BNSF Railway at Yale from Watertown)
- Redfield, South Dakota–Mansfield, South Dakota (Accessed via trackage rights on the BNSF Mitchell - Wolsey - Aberdeen line)

There are interchanges with the BNSF Railway at Wolsey, South Dakota, Crawford, Nebraska, and Florence, Minnesota. The interchange with the Canadian Pacific is at Tracy, Minnesota. The RCPE has trackage rights from Tracy to Mankato, Minnesota on the CPR, where there is an interchange with the Union Pacific Railroad. The RCPE also has trackage rights over the BNSF between Yale, SD to Watertown, South Dakota, and Wolsey, South Dakota to Aberdeen, South Dakota.

== Operations ==
As of 2023, weight capacity between Fort Pierre, South Dakota and Tracy, Minnesota is 286,000 gross pounds per axle, while the weight capacity between Onida, South Dakota and Blunt, South Dakota is 263,000 gross pounds per axle.

== Accidents and incidents ==
- On May 17, 2020, SD40-2 #3437 collided with a 2002-built Ford F250 pickup at Rapid City East, South Dakota while leading a manifest train, but it was repaired and returned to service. However, the unit is slated to be scrapped or rebuilt by the G&W as part a fine resolution agreement with the EPA.

== Locomotive fleet ==
The vast majority of the fleet consisted of EMD SD40-2s.

=== Current fleet ===
| Locomotive | Builder | Model | Serial no. | Frame no. | Build date | Notes |
|---|---|---|---|---|---|---|
| CORP 2036 | EMD | GP38 | 35421 | 7191-118 | 10/1969 | |
| 2085 | EMD | GP38-3 | 32865 | 5723-6 | 2/1967 | |
| 2088 | EMD | GP38-3 | 32879 | 7961-4 | 3/1967 | |
| 2089 | EMD | GP38-3 | 34312 | 7127-31 | 9/1968 | |
| 2086 | EMD | GP38-3 | 34307 | 7127-26 | 9/1968 | |
| 2087 | EMD | GP38-3 | 32873 | 7960-2 | 2/1967 | |
| MNA 2762 | EMD | SD40M-2 | 32431 | 7932-32 | 12/1966 | |
| MNA 2765 | EMD | SD40M-2 | 37909 | 7324-21 | 9/1971 | |
| PNWR 3007 | EMD | GP40 | 32602 | 7942-15 | 1/1967 | stripped to frame and cab |
| KRR 3201 | EMD | SD40M-2 | 32094 | 7912-3 | 8/1966 | |
| AGR 3362 | EMD | SD40-2 | 796311-9 | | 4/1980 | |
| AGR 3412 | EMD | SD40-2 | 796305-7 | | 7/1980 | |
| 3420 | EMD | SD40-2 | 786263-25 | | 11/1979 | |
| 3421 | EMD | SD40-2 | 796297-68 | | 2/1980 | |
| 3423 | EMD | SD40-2 | 796311-1 | | 4/1980 | |
| 3424 | EMD | SD40-2 | 796305-4 | | 7/1980 | |
| 3425 | EMD | SD40-2 | 796297-47 | | 1/1980 | |
| 3426 | EMD | SD40-2 | 786263-32 | | 11/1979 | |
| 3427 | EMD | SD40-2 | 786181-26 | | 6/1979 | |
| 3428 | EMD | SD40-2 | 7334-48 | | 2/1972 | |
| 3429 | EMD | SD40-2 | 796297-64 | | 2/1980 | |
| 3430 | EMD | SD40-2 | 786170-36 | | 2/1979 | |
| 3432 | EMD | SD40-2 | 786181-11 | | 6/1979 | |
| 3433 | EMD | SD40-2 | 766056-22 | | 3/1977 | |
| 3434 | EMD | SD40-2 | 786263-15 | | 11/1979 | |
| 3435 | EMD | SD40-2 | 796297-1 | | 1/1980 | |
| 3436 | EMD | SD40-2 | 766056-14 | | 3/1977 | |
| 3437 | EMD | SD40-2 | 796297-84 | | 2/1980 | Mandated scrapping by EPA |
| 3438 | EMD | SD40-2 | 786263-45 | | 12/1979 | |
| 3444 | EMD | SD40-2 | 776064-6 | | 8/1978 | |
| 3445 | EMD | SD40-2 | 786193-38 | | 11/1979 | |
| 3446 | EMD | SD40-2 | 786170-31 | | 2/1979 | |
| 3447 | EMD | SD40-2 | 766005-8 | | 9/1976 | |
| 3452 | EMD | SD40-2 | 786181-5 | | 6/1979 | |
| 3453 | EMD | SD40-2 | 786218-35 | | 8/1979 | |
| 3454 | EMD | SD40-2 | 766005-5 | | 9/1976 | |
| 3456 | EMD | SD40-2 | 806049-6 | | 9/1981 | |
| 3457 | EMD | SD40-2 | 786170-5 | | 1/1979 | |
| 3458 | EMD | SD40-2 | 786170-53 | | 3/1979 | |
| 3460 | EMD | SD40-2 | 786228-7 | | 9/1979 | |
| 3461 | EMD | SD40-2 | 796297-2 | | 1/1980 | |
| 3462 | GMD | SD40-2 | A3950 | | 9/1980 | |
| 3463 | GMD | SD40-2 | A3947 | | 9/1980 | |
| 3464 | EMD | SD40-2 | 786246-7 | | 9/1979 | |
| 3465 | EMD | SD40-2 | 74661-19 | | 2/1975 | |
| 3467 | EMD | SD40-2 | 796297-102 | | 3/1980 | |
| 3468 | EMD | SD40-2 | 786263-36 | | 11/1979 | |
| 3469 | EMD | SD40-2 | 796311-15 | | 4/1980 | |
| 3470 | EMD | SD40-2 | 786216-41 | | 12/1979 | |
| 3471 | GMD | SD40-2 | A3770 | | 9/1979 | |
| 3480 | EMD | SD40-3 | 37906 | 7324-18 | 9/1971 | |
| 3481 | EMD | SD40-3 | 37648 | 7324-10 | 8/1971 | |
| 3482 | EMD | SD40-3 | 33170 | 7998-10 | 5/1967 | |
| 3999 | EMD | SD40-2 | 796297-17 | | 1/1980 | |
| MNA 4081 | EMD | SD40-2 | 74690-25 | | 3/1975 | |

=== Former locomotives ===
| Locomotive | Builder | Model | Serial no. | Frame no. | Build date | Notes |
|---|---|---|---|---|---|---|
| PNWR 3051 | EMD | SD40-3 | 34576 | 7148-7 | 1/1969 | to PNWR 3051, 2025 |
| LTEX 3099 | EMD | SD45T-2 | 72601-46 | | 6/1972 | to LTEX 3099 |
| 3422 | EMD | SD40-2 | 786218-20 | | 2/1979 | Donated to the American Heartland Railroad Society in 2026 |
| 3431 | EMD | SD40-2 | 796345-25 | | 11/1980 | scrapped 2024 |
| 3455 | EMD | SD40-2 | 796311-17 | | 4/1980 | scrapped 2024 |
| 3459 | EMD | SD40-2 | 796297-74 | | 2/1980 | scrapped 2023 |
| 3466 | EMD | SD40-2 | 786170-63 | | 3/1979 | scrapped 2024 |
| 3483 | EMD | SD40-3 | 35726 | 7214-2 | 1/1970 | scrapped 2023 |
| ARZC 3996 | EMD | SD40M-2 | 7382-2 | | 11/1972 | to KYLE/ARZC 3996 |
| 3997 | EMD | SD40M-2 | 31998 | 7887-8 | 8/1966 | to KYLE 3997 |
| ARZC 4001 | EMD | SD40M-2 | 74601-6 | | 8/1974 | scrapped 2024 |
| ARZC 4002 | EMD | SD40M-2 | 34373 | 7163-4 | 2/1969 | scrapped 2024 |
| 6050 | EMD | SD40-2 | 31431 | 7865-18 | 3/1966 | to AGR 6050; to AGR 3211 |
| 6400 | EMD | SD40-2 | 786170-64 | | 3/1979 | to BAYL 6400 |
| 6403 | EMD | SD40-2 | 786263-22 | | 11/1979 | to TPW 3440 |
| 6406 | EMD | SD40-2 | 806053-1 | | 11/1980 | to AZER 3469; to BPRR 3318; to KYLE/BPRR 3318 |
| 6410 | EMD | SD40-2 | 796297-37 | | 1/1980 | to NECR 3320 |
| 6414 | EMD | SD40-2 | 796297-77 | | 2/1980 | to ARZC/RCPE 6414; to ARZC 3998; to CORP/ARZC 3998 |
| 6415 | EMD | SD40-2 | 74639-19 | | 9/1974 | to TPW 3441 |
| 6416 | EMD | SD40-2 | 786218-2 | | 7/1979 | to BAYL 3321 |
| 6429 | EMD | SD40-2 | 796297-84 | | 2/1980 | to RCPE/AZER 3470; to AZER 3470 |
| 6434 | EMD | SD40-2 | 796297-17 | | 1/1980 | to ARZC/RCPE 6434; to ARZC 3999 |
| 6444 | EMD | SD40-2 | 776064-4 | | 8/1978 | to AZER 3471; to BPRR 3319; to KYLE/BPRR 3319 |
| 6445 | EMD | SD40-2 | 796297-96 | | 3/1980 | to BAYL 6445; to AGR 3213 |
| 6453 | GMD | SD40-2 | A3951 | | 9/1980 | to TPW 3442 |
| 6456 | EMD | SD40-2 | 776088-3 | | 3/1978 | to TPW 3443 |
| LTEX 9282 | EMD | SD45T-2 | 72625-22 | | 3/1973 | to LTEX 9282 |
| LTEX 9345 | EMD | SD45T-2 | 73674-2 | | 1/1975 | to LTEX 9345 |

== See also ==
- Dakota, Minnesota and Eastern Railroad

| Preceded by Indiana Rail Road | Regional Railroad of the Year; 2019 | Succeeded by Reading & Northern Railroad |
