= National Register of Historic Places listings in Hughes County, South Dakota =

Location of Hughes County in South Dakota

This is a list of the National Register of Historic Places listings in Hughes County, South Dakota.

This is intended to be a complete list of the properties and districts on the National Register of Historic Places in Hughes County, South Dakota, United States. The locations of National Register properties and districts for which the latitude and longitude coordinates are included below, may be seen in a map.

There are 43 properties and districts listed on the National Register in the county, including 1 National Historic Landmark.

This National Park Service list is complete through NPS recent listings posted December 12, 2025.

== Current listings ==
	Name on the Register	Image	Date listed	Location	City or town	Description
1	Archeological Site 39HU66		February 23, 1984 (#84003297)	Address restricted	Canning	part of the Petroforms of South Dakota Thematic Resource (TR)
2	Archeological Site 39HU189		February 23, 1984 (#84003307)	Address restricted	Macs Corner	part of the Petroforms of South Dakota TR
3	Archeological Site 39HU201		February 23, 1984 (#84003308)	Address restricted	Pierre	part of the Petroforms of South Dakota TR
4	Arzberger Site	Arzberger Site	October 15, 1966 (#66000715)	Atop the bluff above the McClure Site; 44°20′54″N 100°11′48″W	Pierre	
5	Dr. William and Elizabeth Blackburn House	Dr. William and Elizabeth Blackburn House	May 9, 1997 (#97000426)	219 S. Tyler Ave. 44°21′44″N 100°19′37″W	Pierre	
6	Brink-Wegner House	Brink-Wegner House	April 26, 1978 (#78002557)	110 E. 4th St. 44°22′44″N 100°20′56″W	Pierre	
7	Cedar Islands Archeological District		August 14, 1986 (#86002739)	Address restricted	Pierre	part of the Big Bend Area Multiple Resource Area (MRA)
8	Central Block	Central Block	January 19, 1989 (#88003201)	321-325 S. Pierre St. 44°21′56″N 100°21′19″W	Pierre	
9	Chicago and North Western Railroad Bridge	Chicago and North Western Railroad Bridge	November 19, 1998 (#98001412)	North of U.S. Routes 14/83 over the Missouri River; 44°22′25″N 100°22′12″W	Pierre	part of the Historic Railroads of South Dakota Multiple Property Submission (MPS)
10	Crawford-Pettyjohn House	Crawford-Pettyjohn House	September 22, 1977 (#77001245)	129 S. Washington St. 44°21′49″N 100°20′09″W	Pierre	
11	Farr House	Farr House	December 4, 1980 (#80003723)	106 E. Wynoka St. 44°22′17″N 100°20′56″W	Pierre	
12	Fort George Creek Archeological District		August 14, 1986 (#86002741)	Address restricted	Pierre	part of the Big Bend Area MRA
13	Celina and Albert Goddard House	Celina and Albert Goddard House	February 16, 2018 (#100002102)	111 S Van Buren; 44°21′50″N 100°19′53″W	Pierre	
14	I. W. Goodner House	I. W. Goodner House	March 23, 1995 (#95000278)	216 E. Prospect Ave. 44°22′44″N 100°20′59″W	Pierre	
15	Mentor Graham House	Mentor Graham House	December 13, 1976 (#76001736)	U.S. Route 14; 44°30′45″N 99°59′22″W	Blunt	
16	Peter Hansen House	Peter Hansen House	February 10, 1999 (#98001410)	1123 E. Capitol St. 44°22′23″N 100°20′09″W	Pierre	part of the Lustron Houses in South Dakota MPS
17	Harrold School		October 24, 2003 (#03001073)	206 S. Nixon Ave. 44°31′29″N 99°44′01″W	Harrold	part of the Schools in South Dakota MPS
18	Hilger Block	Hilger Block	May 31, 2006 (#06000456)	361 S. Pierre; 44°22′05″N 100°21′19″W	Pierre	
19	John E. and Ruth Hipple House	John E. and Ruth Hipple House	June 6, 2001 (#01000641)	219 N. Highland; 44°22′09″N 100°20′51″W	Pierre	
20	Horner-Hyde House	Horner-Hyde House	December 20, 1988 (#88002836)	100 W. Capitol Ave. 44°22′10″N 100°21′05″W	Pierre	
21	Hughes County Courthouse	Hughes County Courthouse	February 10, 1993 (#92001859)	Capitol Ave. between Grand and Euclid Aves. 44°22′09″N 100°21′02″W	Pierre	part of the County Courthouses of South Dakota MPS
22	Hyde Buildings	Hyde Buildings	February 1, 1983 (#83003009)	101½, 105, 108½, and 109 S. Pierre St., and 105½ Capitol Ave. 44°22′07″N 100°21′05″W	Pierre	
23	Karcher Block	Karcher Block	August 17, 1993 (#93000783)	366 S. Pierre St. 44°21′57″N 100°21′16″W	Pierre	
24	Karcher-Sahr House	Karcher-Sahr House	September 22, 1977 (#77001246)	222 E. Prospect St. 44°22′09″N 100°20′45″W	Pierre	
25	McClure Site (39HU7)	McClure Site (39HU7)	August 14, 1986 (#86002732)	Southern side of Highway 34 in the SE¼ NE¼ NW¼ of Section 15, T110N R78W; 44°20′09″N 100°12′00″W	Pierre	part of the Big Bend Area MRA
26	Henry M. McDonald House	Henry M. McDonald House	October 19, 1989 (#89001718)	1906 E. Erskine; 44°21′48″N 100°19′30″W	Pierre	
27	George McMillen House	George McMillen House	August 18, 1983 (#83003010)	111 E. Broadway; 44°22′15″N 100°20′58″W	Pierre	
28	Judge C. D. Meade House	Judge C. D. Meade House	October 7, 1977 (#77001247)	106 W. Prospect St. 44°22′13″N 100°21′02″W	Pierre	
29	Medicine Creek Archeological District		August 14, 1986 (#86002740)	Address restricted	Lower Brule	Extends into Lyman County; part of the Big Bend Area MRA
30	Methodist Episcopal Church	Methodist Episcopal Church	May 9, 1997 (#97000428)	117 Central Ave., N. 44°22′16″N 100°21′12″W	Pierre	
31	Oahe Addition Historic District	Oahe Addition Historic District	June 2, 2000 (#00000599)	Roughly bounded by N. Poplar, LaBarge Ct., and 3rd and 4th Sts. 44°22′43″N 100°21′26″W	Pierre	
32	Oahe Chapel	Oahe Chapel	June 6, 1980 (#80003725)	Northwest of Pierre; 44°27′29″N 100°23′08″W	Pierre	
33	Old Fort Sully Site (39HU52)	Old Fort Sully Site (39HU52)	August 14, 1986 (#86002731)	Farm Island Recreation Area; 44°20′43″N 100°16′28″W	Pierre	part of the Big Bend Area MRA
34	Pierre American Legion Cabin	Pierre American Legion Cabin	June 27, 2019 (#100004127)	520 S. Pierre St. 44°21′50″N 100°21′25″W	Pierre	
34	Pierre Hill Residential Historic District	Pierre Hill Residential Historic District	February 23, 1998 (#98000075)	Roughly bounded by Huron Ave., Elizabeth St., Euclid Ave., and Broadway; 44°22′20″N 100°20′52″W	Pierre	
35	Pierre Masonic Lodge	Pierre Masonic Lodge	June 10, 2009 (#09000447)	210 W. Capitol Ave. 44°22′11″N 100°21′12″W	Pierre	
36	Pringle House	Pringle House	August 7, 2012 (#12000485)	102 N. Jefferson; 44°22′04″N 100°20′13″W	Pierre	
37	Rowe House	Rowe House	February 9, 2001 (#01000095)	1118 E. Capitol; 44°21′52″N 100°20′08″W	Pierre	
38	St. Charles Hotel	St. Charles Hotel	May 7, 1980 (#80003724)	207 E. Capitol Ave. 44°22′06″N 100°21′01″W	Pierre	
39	Kenneth R. Scurr House	Kenneth R. Scurr House	August 5, 1993 (#93000780)	121 S. Washington Ave. 44°21′54″N 100°19′36″W	Pierre	
40	Soldiers & Sailors World War Memorial	Soldiers & Sailors World War Memorial	January 27, 1983 (#83003011)	Capitol Ave. 44°21′58″N 100°20′49″W	Pierre	
41	South Dakota State Capitol	South Dakota State Capitol	September 1, 1976 (#76001737)	Bounded by Broadway, Washington, and Capitol Aves. 44°22′43″N 100°21′17″W	Pierre	
42	Stephens-Lucas House	Stephens-Lucas House	May 26, 1977 (#77001248)	123 N. Nicollette; 44°22′07″N 100°20′43″W	Pierre	

=== Former listings ===
	Name on the Register	Image	Date listed	Date removed	Location	City or town	Description
1	Brandhuber Ice Company Barn		October 22, 1980 (#80003722)	April 11, 1997	419 S. Fort St.	Pierre	Destroyed by fire on April 5, 1995.

== See also ==
- List of National Historic Landmarks in South Dakota
- National Register of Historic Places listings in South Dakota
