= Jeff Monroe =

American politician

Member of the South Dakota Senate from the 24th district
- In office January 8, 2013 – January 11, 2021
- Preceded by: Bob Gray
- Succeeded by: Mary Duvall

Member of the South Dakota House of Representatives from the 24th district
- In office January 1995 – January 2003 Serving with Lola Schreiber, Patricia de Hueck, Cooper Garnos
- Preceded by: Mike Shaw
- Succeeded by: Tim Rounds

Personal details
- Born: September 5, 1956 (age 70) Grafton, North Dakota, U.S.
- Party: Republican
- Education: University of Nebraska–Lincoln (BA); Northwestern Health Sciences University (DC)

Jeffrey Rodrick "Jeff" Monroe (born September 5, 1956) is an American politician and a Republican member of the South Dakota Senate representing District 24 since January 8, 2013. Monroe served non-consecutively in the South Dakota Legislature from January 1995 until January 2003 in the South Dakota House of Representatives District 24 seat.

In October 2025, he announced his candidacy for State Treasurer in the 2026 election.

== Education ==
Monroe graduated from the University of Nebraska–Lincoln and Northwestern College of Chiropractic (now Northwestern Health Sciences University) with post graduate work at New York Chiropractic College.

== Elections ==
- 1994 When House District 24 incumbent Republican Representative Mike Shaw left the Legislature and left the seat open, Monroe ran in the four-way June 7, 1994 Republican Primary and placed second with 2,082 votes (25.11%), in the four-way November 8, 1994 General election, incumbent Republican Representative Lola Schreiber took the first seat by 8 votes and Monroe took the second seat with 6,913 votes (32.7%) ahead of Democratic nominees Kerry Bowers and Bob Hiatt.
- 1996 When House District 24 incumbent Republican Representative Schreiber left the Legislature and left a seat open, Monroe ran in the five-way 1996 Republican Primary and placed second with 2,082 votes (25.11%), in the four-way November 5, 1996 General election, Patricia de Hueck took the first seat and Monroe took the second seat with 5,218 votes (25.28%) ahead of Democratic nominees Ken Larsen and James Hoffman.
- 1998 When House District 24 incumbent Republican Representative de Hueck left the Legislature and left a seat open, Monroe ran in the four-way 1998 Republican Primary and placed first with 2,490 votes (30.99%), in the four-way November 3, 1998 General election, fellow Republican nominee Cooper Garnos took the first seat and Monroe took the second seat with votes (29.7%) ahead of returning 1996 Democratic opponent James Hoffman and Democratic nominee Duwayne Slaathaug.
- 2000 Monroe and Representative Garnos were unopposed for the June 6, 2000 Republican Primary and won the three-way November 7, 2000 General election where Representative Garnos took the first seat and Monroe took the second seat with 7,123 votes (39.5%) ahead of Democratic nominee Robert Hockett.
- 2002 Term limited from remaining in the House, Monroe challenged incumbent Republican Senator de Hueck for the District 24 seat, but lost the June 4, 2002 Republican Primary by 94 votes to Senator de Hueck; de Hueck was unopposed for the November 5, 2002 General election; she lost the primary election in 2004, and served in the seat from 2001 until 2005.
- 2012 When incumbent Senate District 22 Republican Senator Bob Gray was term limited and left the District 24 seat open, Monroe won the June 5, 2012 Republican Primary by 35 votes with 1,999 votes (50.4%) against Republican Representative Tad Perry; an election recount did not change the result. Monroe was unopposed for the November Primary.
- 2014 Jeff Monroe was challenged in the June 3, 2014 primary election again by Tad Perry. Monroe defeated Perry 2541 to 2294 votes (52.6% to 47.4%). Monroe's opponent in the November election was Democrat Ruth Rehn, whom he defeated on a 59% to 41% vote.
- In 2016, Monroe ran unopposed for State Senate.

== Controversies ==
In the 2016 session, Monroe sponsored South Dakota Senate Bill 84 that prevents prohibiting public school teachers from presenting "the strengths and weaknesses of scientific information presented...". This bill closely follows the strategy of the Wedge strategy authored by the intelligent design think tank the Discovery Institute.

Then in the 2020 SD legislative session, Monroe promoted his self interest as a chiropractor when he sponsored SD Senate Bill 99.
