= Raber =

Raber may refer to:

== People ==
- August Raber (born 2009), Swedish racing driver
- Karen Raber, American academic specialising in the study of Shakespeare
- Maximilian Raber (born 1992), German politician
- Sari Raber (born 1986), retired Canadian soccer player

== Places ==
- Raber, Indiana
- Raber Township, Michigan
  - Raber, Michigan, an unincorporated community
- Raber Township, Hughes County, South Dakota
