= Hughes County, South Dakota =

County in South Dakota, United States

- County
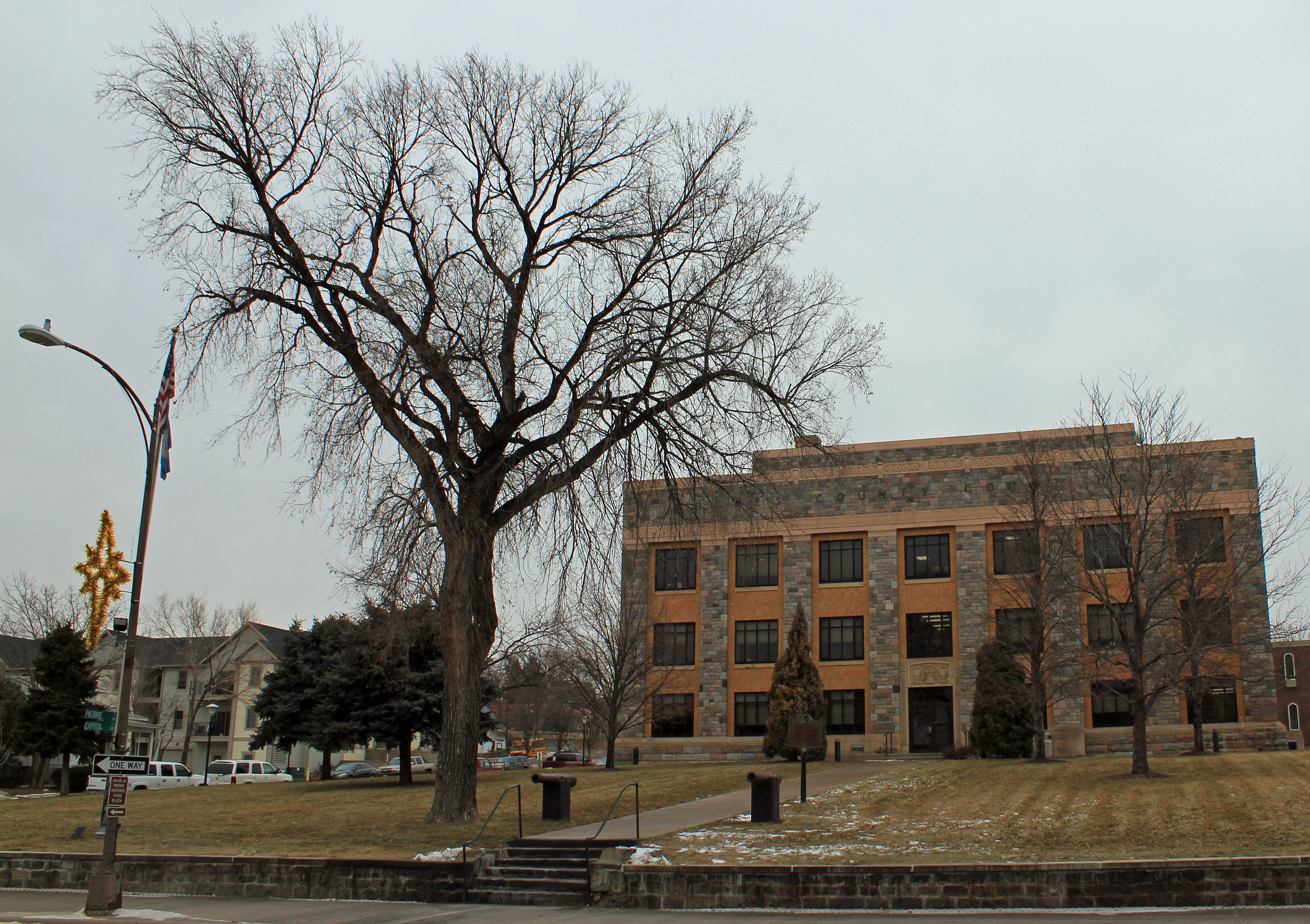
- Hughes County Courthouse in Pierre

- Location within the U.S. state of South Dakota
- Coordinates: 44°23′N 99°59′W
- Country: United States
- State: South Dakota
- Founded: January 8, 1873 (created); November 26, 1880 (organized)
- Named for: Alexander Hughes
- Seat: Pierre
- Largest city: Pierre

Area
  - Total: 801 sq mi (2,070 km^{2})
  - Land: 742 sq mi (1,920 km^{2})
  - Water: 59 sq mi (150 km^{2}) 7.4%

Population (2020)
  - Total: 17,765
  - Estimate (2025): 17,570 ▼
  - Density: 23.9/sq mi (9.24/km^{2})
- Time zone: UTC−6 (Central)
  - Summer (DST): UTC−5 (CDT)
- Congressional district: At-large
- Website: www.hughescounty.org

Hughes County is a county in the U.S. state of South Dakota. As of the 2020 census, the population was 17,765, making it the least populous capital county in the nation, and the 12th most populous county in South Dakota. Its county seat and most populous city is Pierre, which is also the state capital. The county was created in 1873, and was organized in 1880. It was named for Alexander Hughes, a legislator. On June 4, 1891, the county's area was increased by the addition of Farm Island, in the Missouri River downstream of Pierre.

Hughes County is part of the Pierre, SD Micropolitan Statistical Area.

== Geography ==
The Missouri River forms the southwestern boundary line of Hughes County. The county's terrain consists of rolling hills cut by gullies and drainages. The area is partially dedicated to agriculture, including the use of center pivot irrigation.

The county terrain generally slopes to the southeast, although the hills along the west fall off into the river valley. The county's highest point is on the upper part of the east boundary line, at 1,952 ft (595 m) ASL. The county has a total area of 801 square miles (2,070 km^{2}), of which 742 square miles (1,920 km^{2}) is land and 59 square miles (150 km^{2}) (7.4%) is water.

=== Major highways ===
- U.S. Highway 14
- U.S. Highway 83
- South Dakota Highway 34
- South Dakota Highway 1804

=== Airport ===
Pierre Regional Airport (PIR) serves Hughes County and the surrounding communities.

=== Adjacent counties ===
- Sully County – north
- Hyde County – east
- Lyman County – south
- Stanley County – west

=== Protected areas ===
- Arikara State Game Production Area
- Buckeye State Game Production Area
- Cowan State Game Production Area
- DeGrey State Game Production Area
- DeGrey State Lakeside Use Area
- Dry Run State Game Production Area
- East Shore State Lakeside Use Area
- Farm Island State Recreation Area
- Fort George State Game Production Area
- Fort George State Lakeside Use Area
- Gutenkauf State Game Production Area
- Joe Creek Recreation Area
- LaFramboise Island State Nature Area
- North Bend State Lakeside Use Area
- North Big Bend State Game Production Area
- Oahe Mission Recreation Area
- Peoria Flats State Game Production Area
- Peoria Flats State Lakeside Use Area
- Rousseau State Game Production Area
- Rousseau State Lakeside Use Area
- Sand Creek State Game Production Area
- Spring Creek State Recreation Area
- Tailrace Recreation Area
- Valley state Game Production Area
- West Bend State Recreation Area
- West Big Bend State Game Production Area
- West DeGrey State Game Production Area
- Woodruff Lake State Game Production Area

=== Lakes ===
- Lake Oahe (part)
- Lake Sharpe (part)
- Woodruff Lake

== Demographics ==
Historical population
Census	Pop.	Note	%±
1880	268		—
1890	5,044		1,782.1%
1900	3,684		−27.0%
1910	6,271		70.2%
1920	5,711		−8.9%
1930	7,009		22.7%
1940	6,624		−5.5%
1950	8,111		22.4%
1960	12,725		56.9%
1970	11,632		−8.6%
1980	14,220		22.2%
1990	14,817		4.2%
2000	16,481		11.2%
2010	17,022		3.3%
2020	17,765		4.4%
2025 (est.)	17,570	▼	−1.1%
U.S. Decennial Census; 1790–1960 1900–1990; 1990–2000 2010–2020

=== 2020 census ===
As of the 2020 census, there were 17,765 people, 7,240 households, and 4,506 families residing in the county. The population density was 24.0 inhabitants per square mile (9.3/km^{2}).

Of the residents, 24.0% were under the age of 18 and 18.0% were 65 years of age or older; the median age was 39.3 years. For every 100 females there were 93.8 males, and for every 100 females age 18 and over there were 90.4 males.

The racial makeup of the county was 80.1% White, 0.5% Black or African American, 12.0% American Indian and Alaska Native, 0.7% Asian, 1.0% from some other race, and 5.6% from two or more races. Hispanic or Latino residents of any race comprised 2.8% of the population.

There were 7,240 households in the county, of which 28.5% had children under the age of 18 living with them and 24.5% had a female householder with no spouse or partner present. About 32.0% of all households were made up of individuals and 12.5% had someone living alone who was 65 years of age or older.

There were 7,922 housing units, of which 8.6% were vacant. Among occupied housing units, 67.5% were owner-occupied and 32.5% were renter-occupied. The homeowner vacancy rate was 1.2% and the rental vacancy rate was 9.3%.

=== 2010 census ===
As of the 2010 census, there were 17,022 people, 7,066 households, and 4,435 families in the county. The population density was 23.0 inhabitants per square mile (8.9/km^{2}). There were 7,623 housing units at an average density of 10.3 per square mile (4.0/km^{2}). The racial makeup of the county was 85.7% white, 10.5% American Indian, 0.5% black or African American, 0.5% Asian, 0.5% from other races, and 2.3% from two or more races. Those of Hispanic or Latino origin made up 1.8% of the population. In terms of ancestry, 42.7% were German, 12.4% were Norwegian, 9.8% were Irish, 9.7% were English, and 3.8% were American.

Of the 7,066 households, 30.2% had children under the age of 18 living with them, 49.5% were married couples living together, 9.4% had a female householder with no husband present, 37.2% were non-families, and 32.3% of all households were made up of individuals. The average household size was 2.30 and the average family size was 2.90. The median age was 39.8 years.

The median income for a household in the county was $53,501 and the median income for a family was $70,881. Males had a median income of $42,701 versus $32,265 for females. The per capita income for the county was $28,236. About 7.1% of families and 9.3% of the population were below the poverty line, including 14.5% of those under age 18 and 6.0% of those age 65 or over.

== Politics ==
Hughes is a strongly Republican county in Presidential and Congressional elections. The last Democrat to win a majority in the county was Franklin D. Roosevelt in 1936. In 2012, Republican Mitt Romney won 64% of the county's vote.

United States presidential election results for Hughes County, South Dakota
Year	Republican		Democratic		Third party(ies)	
Year	No.	%	No.	%	No.	%
1892	459	62.88%	102	13.97%	169	23.15%
1896	462	58.19%	327	41.18%	5	0.63%
1900	537	65.65%	272	33.25%	9	1.10%
1904	929	72.18%	335	26.03%	23	1.79%
1908	795	66.64%	349	29.25%	49	4.11%
1912	0	0.00%	544	50.51%	533	49.49%
1916	611	51.13%	536	44.85%	48	4.02%
1920	1,313	68.31%	433	22.53%	176	9.16%
1924	1,260	53.21%	325	13.72%	783	33.07%
1928	1,912	61.56%	1,171	37.70%	23	0.74%
1932	1,374	42.02%	1,852	56.64%	44	1.35%
1936	1,547	46.71%	1,662	50.18%	103	3.11%
1940	1,982	59.27%	1,362	40.73%	0	0.00%
1944	1,676	64.12%	938	35.88%	0	0.00%
1948	1,739	61.43%	1,080	38.15%	12	0.42%
1952	2,932	75.86%	933	24.14%	0	0.00%
1956	2,923	63.41%	1,687	36.59%	0	0.00%
1960	3,320	61.99%	2,036	38.01%	0	0.00%
1964	2,732	51.18%	2,606	48.82%	0	0.00%
1968	3,204	61.46%	1,666	31.96%	343	6.58%
1972	4,231	67.35%	2,037	32.43%	14	0.22%
1976	3,997	61.15%	2,506	38.34%	33	0.50%
1980	4,652	66.00%	1,751	24.84%	645	9.15%
1984	4,985	70.32%	2,072	29.23%	32	0.45%
1988	4,545	61.07%	2,853	38.34%	44	0.59%
1992	4,325	53.26%	2,578	31.74%	1,218	15.00%
1996	4,469	56.80%	2,788	35.43%	611	7.77%
2000	5,188	68.86%	2,212	29.36%	134	1.78%
2004	6,017	68.10%	2,697	30.53%	121	1.37%
2008	5,298	62.56%	3,037	35.86%	133	1.57%
2012	5,219	64.00%	2,786	34.16%	150	1.84%
2016	5,174	63.29%	2,450	29.97%	551	6.74%
2020	5,522	63.30%	2,953	33.85%	248	2.84%
2024	5,379	63.77%	2,838	33.65%	218	2.58%

In the South Dakota Senate Hughes is part of the 24th Senate district, which is held by Republican Bob Gray. In the State House Hughes is part of district 24, which is held by Republicans Tad Perry and Mark Venner.

== Communities ==
=== Cities ===
- Blunt
- Pierre (county seat)

=== Town ===
- Harrold

=== Census-designated place ===
- Oahe Acres

=== Unincorporated communities ===
- Canning

=== Townships ===
- Raber
- Valley

=== Unorganized territories ===
- Crow Creek
- North Hughes
- West Hughes

== Education ==
School districts include:

- Agar-Blunt-Onida School District 58-3
- Highmore-Harrold School District 34-2
- Pierre School District 32-2

== See also ==
- National Register of Historic Places listings in Hughes County, South Dakota
