= Tim Rounds =

American politician (born 1959)

Member of the South Dakota House of Representatives from the 24th district
- In office January 11, 2013 – January 10, 2021 Serving with Mary Duvall
- Preceded by: Tad Perry
- Succeeded by: Will Mortenson; Mike Weisgram
- In office January 2003 – January 2011
- Preceded by: Jeff Monroe
- Succeeded by: Tad Perry

Personal details
- Born: November 17, 1959 (age 66) Pierre, South Dakota, U.S.
- Party: Republican
- Relatives: Mike Rounds (brother)
- Education: Black Hills State University

Tim G. Rounds (born November 17, 1959) is an American politician and formerly a Republican member of the South Dakota House of Representatives representing District 24 (in one of two seats) from January 2013 to January 2021. Rounds previously served from January 2003 until January 2011 in a District 24 seat, but took a break from the House due to the state's term limits, which also caused him to leave the House after his second stint.

== Education ==
Rounds earned his BS from Black Hills State University.

== Elections ==
In 2002, incumbent Republican Representative Jeff Monroe ran for the South Dakota Senate and Republican Representative Cooper Garnos was redistricted to District 26, leaving both District 24 seats open. Rounds ran in the four-way Republican primary June 4, 2002 and placed first with 3,738 votes (42.6%). In the four-way general election on November 5, 2002, Rounds took the first seat with 5,714 votes (30.1%) and fellow Republican nominee Ryan Olson took the second seat ahead of Democratic nominees Ann Thompson and Peggy Cruse.

In 2004, Rounds and Olson were unopposed for both the June 1, 2004 Republican primary and the November 2, 2004 general election, where Rounds took the first seat with 7,956 votes (57.3%) and Olson took the second seat.

In 2006, Rounds and Olson were unopposed for both the June 6, 2006 Republican primary and the November 7, 2006 general election, where Olson took the first seat and Rounds took the second seat with 6,026 votes (47.9%).

In 2008, Rounds and Olson were challenged for both the three-way Republican primary on June 3, 2008, where Rounds placed second with 2,613 votes (35.8%), and the four-way general election on November 4, 2008, general election where Olson took the first seat and Rounds took the second seat with 5,963 votes (31.0%), ahead of Democratic nominees Jodi Owen and Ann Eichinger. Rounds and Olson were both term limited and left the Legislature after the end of the term, having served eight years side by side.

In 2012, incumbent Republican state Representative Tad Perry ran for the South Dakota Senate and left a District 24 House seat open. Rounds ran in the three-way Republican primary on June 5, 2012 and placed second with 2,288 votes (34.1%) ahead of incumbent Representative Mark Venner, who placed third. Rounds and fellow Republican nominee Mary Duvall were unopposed for the November 6, 2012 general election, where Rounds took the first seat with 7,248 votes (54.08%) and Duvall took the second seat.

== Personal life ==
Tim Rounds is the younger brother of the 31st Governor of South Dakota and U.S. Senator Mike Rounds.
