= Mary Noyes Farr =

American physician

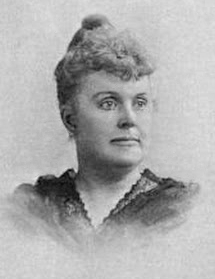
- Mary Noyes Farr, from an 1895 publication
- Born: Mary Ella Noyes; 1853; Landaff, New Hampshire
- Died: January 1, 1938 (aged 84–85); Pierre, South Dakota
- Occupations: Physician, suffragist, educator, clubwoman
- Relatives: Amos C. Noyes (uncle)

Mary Ella Noyes Farr (1853—January 1, 1938) was an American osteopathic physician, educator, clubwoman, and suffragist, based in Pierre, South Dakota.

== Early life and education ==
Mary Ella Noyes was born in 1853, in Landaff, New Hampshire, the daughter of Rufus H. Noyes and Patience Gordon Hall Noyes. Pennsylvania politician and timberman Amos C. Noyes was her uncle. She attended Philena McKeen's school in Andover, Massachusetts. She taught school as a young woman, in New Hampshire, Iowa, and Washington, D.C.

== Career ==
Farr moved to Dakota Territory with her husband and her younger brother Frank in 1882. She ran a millinery business in Harrold, Dakota Territory. After 1889, Farr had an art studio in Pierre, South Dakota and taught art at Pierre University. She worked on South Dakota's contribution to the 1893 World's Columbian Exposition in Chicago. In 1895 she was one of South Dakota's delegates to the National Education Association meeting in Denver.

In 1899, Farr graduated from the Boston Institute of Osteopathy and became an osteopathic doctor. She served on the state board of osteopathic medicine, and lobbied for state legislation related to osteopathy.

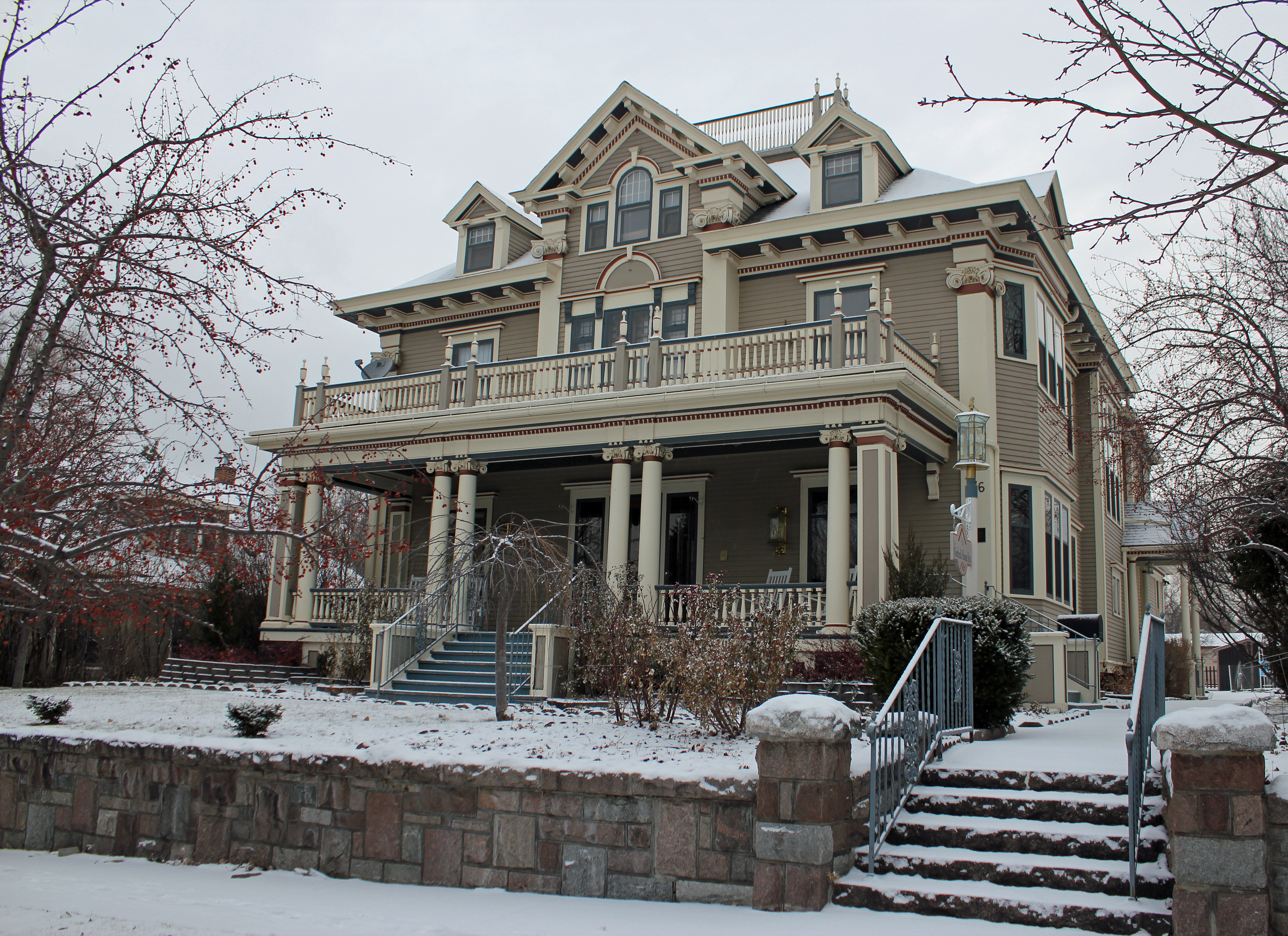
Farr House, the home of E. P. Farr and Mary Noyes Farr in Pierre, South Dakota.

Farr was a clubwoman, active in the Federation of Women's Clubs and the temperance movement. In 1903, she was elected national senior vice president of the Woman's Relief Corps. She was Grand Matron of the South Dakota Order of the Eastern Star in 1905 and 1906. In 1915, she went to the South Dakota legislature to petition in favor of women's suffrage. After the nineteenth amendment passed extending American women the right to vote, she was involved in the Pierre chapter of the League of Women Voters. In 1924, she was a candidate for the position of sergeant-at-arms in the South Dakota State Senate.

== Personal life ==
Mary Noyes married fellow Vermonter Col. Edward P. Farr, a banker and Civil War veteran, in 1882. They lived in Farr House, which is now a historic site in Pierre. She was widowed when Farr died in 1923, and she died in 1938, aged 83 years, in Pierre.
