= Peggy Cruse =

American politician and farmer (born 1934)

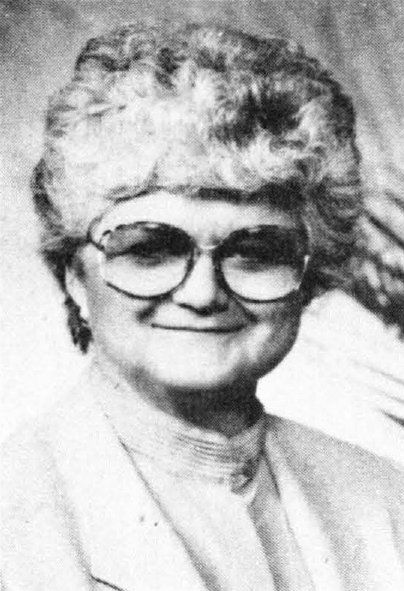
- Official portrait, c. 1987

Member of the South Dakota House of Representatives from the 24th district
- In office January 10, 1987 – January 10, 1989 Serving with Bernard Christenson
- Preceded by: Benny Gross
- Succeeded by: Michael H. Shaw

Personal details
- Born: Peggy Patterson; December 18, 1934 (age 91) Merkel, Texas, U.S.
- Party: Democratic
- Spouse: Max Cruse (m. 1954; died 2017)
- Children: 2

Peggy Cruse (née Patterson; born December 18, 1934) is an American politician and farmer. Born in Merkel, Texas, she moved to Pierre, South Dakota, upon wedding her husband. She served on the Associated School Boards of South Dakota and on the Pierre Board of Education. In 1986, Cruse was elected to the South Dakota House of Representatives as a member of the Democratic Party. While in the House, she advocated for children's issues, including tougher regulations on day cares. She ran for a second term in 1988, but lost to Republicans Michael H. Shaw and Lola Schreiber. Cruse ran for the House again in 2002; however, lost again, placing last in a field of four candidates. Afterwards, she served on the South Dakota Alzheimer's Disease and Related Dementias State Plan Work Group from 2017 to 2018, and as secretary of the South Dakota Discovery Center in 2025.

== Life and career ==
Peggy Patterson was born on December 18, 1934, in Merkel, Texas. She was a graduate of Hale Center High School. She married Max Cruse on June 8, 1954, in Friona, Texas. Together, they had three children: Teryl, Cathy, and Brad. Following their wedding, Peggy moved with Max to Pierre, South Dakota. In 1976, the Cruses ran a farm sized at 6,800 acres (2,800 ha; 10.6 mi^{2}; 28 km^{2}).

In June 1966, Peggy Cruse was elected as vice chairman of the Hughes County Democratic Party. She was then appointed to the Associated School Boards of South Dakota in August 1967. The following year in September, she resigned from the board and was replaced by Phyllis Wulf of rural Aurora County. In May 1974, Peggy was installed as treasurer of the Pierre Toastmistress Club. In June 1977, Cruse was elected to the Pierre Board of Education, alongside Patricia Adam. She won re-election unopposed in 1980. Cruse and Adam were appointed to the professional performance evaluation committee. In 1983, Cruse and Adam faced challenges from Don Cleland and Casey Kebach. Adam won re-election with 1,488 votes; however, Cruse lost to Kebach by a margin of 30. In the 1986 election to the South Dakota House of Representatives, Cruse challenged incumbents Benny Gross and Bernard Christenson, both Republicans, to represent the 24th district. In the general election in November, although Christenson managed to hold his seat, Cruse defeated Gross by a 3-point margin. Cruse was sworn in alongside the rest of the South Dakota Legislature on January 10, 1987. The South Dakota Farmers' Union gave Cruse a perfect rating for her voting record in the 1987 session. She was given a rating of 70 percent for the following year.

While in the House, Cruse advocated for various issues related to children, such as calling for a state commission on children's issues and stricter regulations on day cares. In October 1987, the Local Government Study Commission proposed legislation that would force the approximately 4,000 unlicensed day cares in South Dakota to register. Cruse welcomed the proposal, although she criticized the panel for not recommending a state commission for regulating child care issues. The proposal passed the House Health and Welfare Committee in a 7–5 vote in February 1988. In December 1987, Cruse and the three female members of the Legislature's Appropriations Committee convinced the committee to reject the abolition of the Commission on the Status of Women. In March 1988, Cruse formally requested George S. Mickelson, the governor of South Dakota, to appoint a child care commission.

Cruse ran for re-election in 1988, but lost to Republicans Michael H. Shaw and Lola Schreiber. Cruse placed third in a field of four candidates, losing by over 10 points to Schreiber. Mickelson believed that Cruse's opposition to a ban on corporate pig farming was the root cause of her defeat. Cruse was succeeded by Shaw, who was sworn in on January 10, 1989. In the 1992 United States presidential election, Cruse endorsed Bill Clinton and served as a member of his campaign's South Dakota committee. She was also delegate for Clinton at the 1992 Democratic National Convention. In 1993, Cruse was selected as secretary of the South Dakota Senate after Democrats won a majority of seats, a position she served in until 1994. In 2002, Cruse again sought to represent the 24th district in the House. She placed last with 19 percent of the vote.

A 2002 biography in the Argus Leader listed her occupation as a retired farmer. Cruse's husband Max died on January 22, 2017, of Alzheimer's disease. Soon after, from April 2017 to February 2018, Cruse was a member of the South Dakota Alzheimer's Disease and Related Dementias State Plan Work Group, which aimed to create a plan to improve health care in South Dakota for those affected by Alzheimer's. In 2025, she served as secretary of the South Dakota Discovery Center, a children's museum in Pierre.

== Electoral history ==
1983 Pierre Board of Education election
Candidate	Votes	%
Patricia Adam	1,488	29.25%
Casey Kebach	1,224	24.06%
Peggy Cruse	1,194	23.47%
Donald Cleland	1,181	23.22%
Total votes	5,087	100.00%

1986 South Dakota House of Representatives 24th district election
Party	Candidate	Votes	%
Republican	Bernard Christenson (incumbent)	6,149	36.19%
Democratic	Peggy Cruse	5,679	33.42%
Republican	Benny Gross (incumbent)	5,165	30.39%
Total votes		16,993	100.00%

1988 South Dakota House of Representatives 24th district election
Party	Candidate	Votes	%
Republican	Michael H. Shaw	6,342	31.88%
Republican	Lola Schreiber	6,009	30.21%
Democratic	Peggy Cruse (incumbent)	3,904	19.63%
Democratic	Tom Fennell	3,636	18.28%
Total votes		19,891	100.00%

2002 South Dakota House of Representatives 24th district election
Party	Candidate	Votes	%
Republican	Tim Rounds	5,714	30.05%
Republican	Ryan P. Olson	5,266	27.70%
Democratic	Ann Thompson	4,469	23.50%
Democratic	Peggy Cruse	3,565	18.75%
Total votes		19,014	100.00%
