= Central block =

Central block may refer to:

- Central Block (Pierre, South Dakota), a building in Pierre, South Dakota
- Central nerve block, including epidural and spinal anaesthesia
- Central Block, the grand coalition which ruled Portugal from 1983 to 1985
- Centre Block, the main building of the Parliament of Canada
