= Lee Qualm =

American politician

Majority Leader of the South Dakota House of Representatives
- In office January 10, 2017 – January 12, 2021
- Preceded by: Brian Gosch
- Succeeded by: Kent Peterson

Member of the South Dakota House of Representatives from the 21st district
- In office January 11, 2013 – January 12, 2021
- Preceded by: James Schaefer
- Succeeded by: Rocky Blare

Personal details
- Born: February 23, 1954 (age 72) Platte, South Dakota, U.S.
- Party: Republican
- Education: Mitchell Technical Institute
- Website: Campaign website

Lee D. Qualm (born February 23, 1954) is an American politician who served as a member of the South Dakota House of Representatives from January 11, 2013 to January 12, 2021.

== Elections ==
- 2012 When District 21 incumbent Republican Representative James Schaefer redistricted to District 26, Qualm and appointed Representative David Scott ran unopposed for the June 5, 2012 Republican Primary; in the four-way November 6, 2012 General election, former Democratic Senator Julie Bartling took the first seat and Qualm took the second seat with 4,421 votes (27.07%) ahead of Representative Scott and Democratic nominee Gary Coleman.
- 2010 When District 21 incumbent Republican Representatives Thomas Deadrick was term limited and retired and left a District 21 seat open, Qualm ran in the three-way June 8, 2010 Republican Primary but lost to incumbent Representative Kent Juhnke and James Schaefer, who went on to win the four-way November 2, 2010 General election against Democratic nominees David Reis (a perennial candidate who had sought legislative seats in 2002, 2004, 2006, and 2008) and Norm Cihak.

South Dakota House of Representatives
Preceded by Brian Gosch	Majority Leader of the South Dakota House of Representatives; 2017–2021	Succeeded by Kent Peterson
