= Spiritual transformation =

Fundamental change in an individual

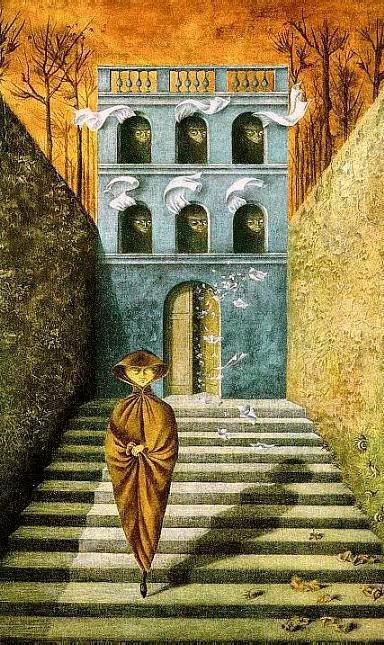
Spiritual transformation is a major theme in Western art - a version of Remedios Varo's 1955 painting Ruptura

Spiritual transformation involves a fundamental change in a person's sacred or spiritual life.

Psychologists examine spiritual transformation within the context of an individual's meaning system, especially in relation to concepts of the sacred or of ultimate concern. Two of the fuller treatments of the concept in psychology come from Kenneth Pargament and from Raymond Paloutzian.

Pargament holds that "at its heart, spiritual transformation refers to a fundamental change in the place of the sacred or the character of the sacred in the life of the individual. Spiritual transformation can be understood in terms of new configurations of strivings" (p. 18).

Paloutzian suggests that "spiritual transformation constitutes a change in the meaning system that a person holds as a basis for self-definition, the interpretation of life, and overarching purposes and ultimate concerns" (p. 334).

One school of thought emphasises the importance of "rigorous self-discipline" in spiritual transformation.

== Research ==
The Metanexus Institute (founded 1997) in New York has sponsored scientific research on spiritual transformation.

== Terminology ==
Occurrences of the phrase "spiritual transformation" in Google Books suggest a surge in the popularity of the concept from the late-20th century.

== See also ==
- Aurobindo
- Integral transformative practice
- Meditation
- Sivananda
- Spiritual evolution
- Supermind
- Transpersonal psychology
- Shriram Sharma Acharya
- Mahdi
