= James Schaefer =

American politician (1938–2018)

Member of the South Dakota House of Representatives from the 26 district
- In office January 11, 2013 – May 29, 2018
- Preceded by: Kim Vanneman
- Succeeded by: Rebecca Reimer

Member of the South Dakota House of Representatives from the 21st district
- In office 2011–2013
- Preceded by: Thomas Deadrick
- Succeeded by: Lee Qualm

Personal details
- Born: August 30, 1938
- Died: May 29, 2018 (aged 79) Kennebec, South Dakota, U.S.
- Party: Republican
- Profession: Rancher

James George Schaefer (August 30, 1938 – May 29, 2018) was an American politician and a Republican member of the South Dakota House of Representatives. Schaefer was first elected to the state House from District 21 in 2010. Redistricting in 2012 placed him in District 26B, where he won election in 2012, and had served from January 11, 2013, until his death. He lived in Kennebec, South Dakota, and was a rancher. Schaefer died, on May 29, 2018, in an UTV accident at his ranch near Kennebec.

== Elections ==
- 2012 Redistricted to District 26B. As the incumbent Representative, Republican Kim Vanneman left the Legislature and the seat was open, Schaefer was unopposed for the June 5, 2012, Republican Primary. He won the November 6, 2012, General election in the Republican-majority district with 2,981 votes (58.92%) against Democratic nominee Maynard Konechne.
- 2010 When incumbent Republican Representative Thomas Deadrick was term limited and left a District 21 seat open, Schaefer ran in the three-way June 8, 2010, Republican Primary, placing second with 1,082 votes (32.32%) ahead of Lee Qualm; Qualm was elected to the House District 21 seat in 2012. In the November 2, 2010, General election, Representative Kent Juhnke took the first seat and Schaefer took the second seat with 3,488 votes (25.72%) against Democratic nominees David Reis (a perennial candidate who had sought legislative seats in 2002, 2004, 2006, and 2008) and Norm Cihak.

== Death ==
Jim Schaefer died from an ATV collision on May 29, 2018, on his ranch near Kennebec, SD
