= Kim Vanneman =

American politician

Member of the South Dakota House of Representatives from the 26th district
- In office January 9, 2007 – January 8, 2013
- Preceded by: Cooper Garnos; Barry M. Jensen
- Succeeded by: Troy Heinert; James Schaefer

Personal details
- Born: January 13, 1957 (age 69)
- Party: Republican

Kim Vanneman (born January 13, 1957) is an American politician who served in the South Dakota House of Representatives from the 26th district from 2007 to 2013.
