= Pierre micropolitan area =

Pierre Micropolitan Area
- Micropolitan Statistical Area
- Pierre, SD Micropolitan Statistical Area
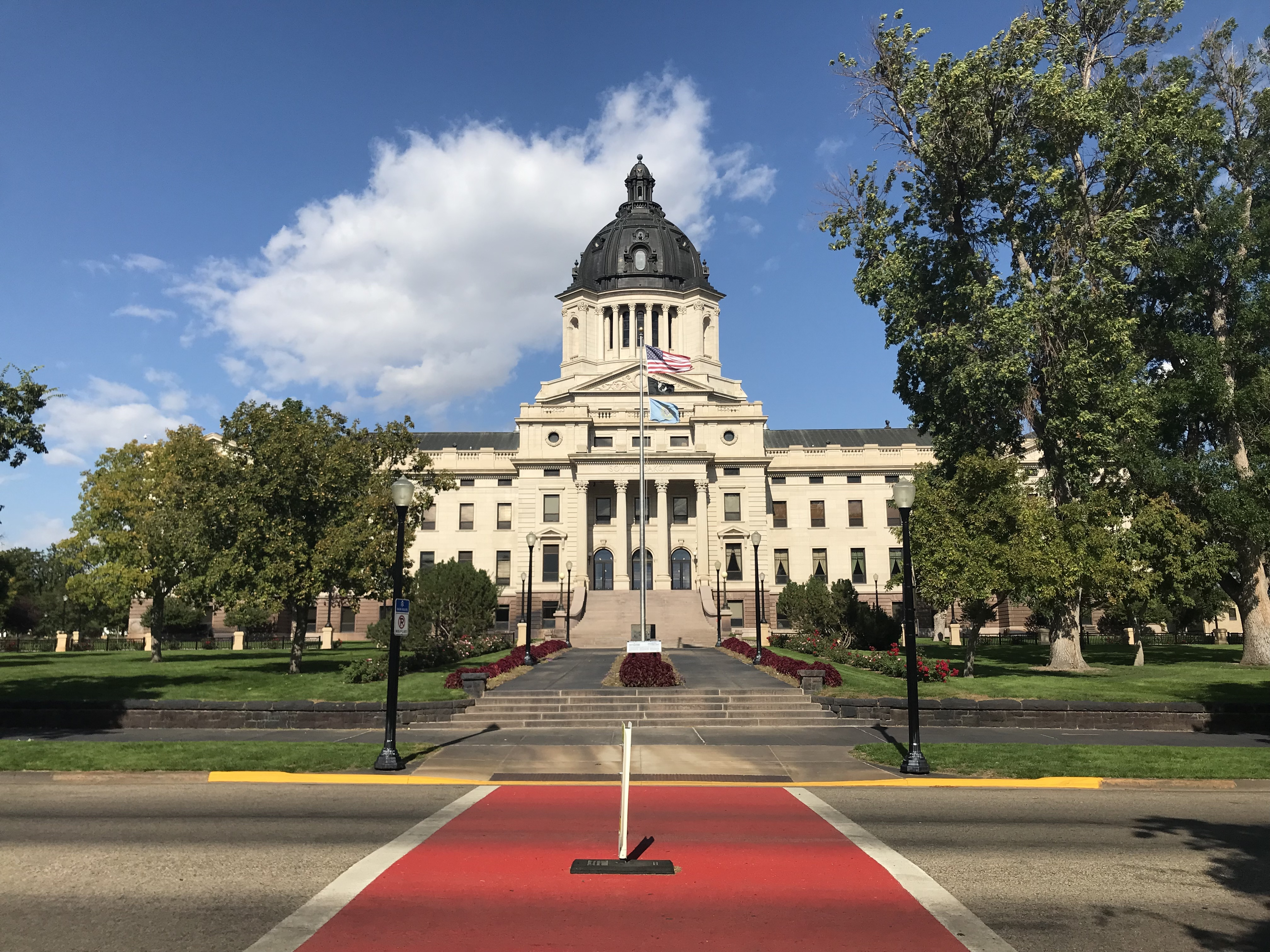
- South Dakota State Capitol
Interactive Map of Pierre, SD μSA
City of Pierre
Pierre, SD μSA
- Country: United States
- State: South Dakota
- Largest city: Pierre
- Other city: Fort Pierre

Population (2020)
  - Total: 20,750
- Time zones: UTC−6 (CST)
  - Summer (DST): UTC−5 (CDT)
- UTC−7 (MST)
  - Summer (DST): UTC−6 (MDT)

The Pierre Micropolitan Statistical Area, as defined by the United States Census Bureau, is an area consisting of two counties in South Dakota, anchored by the state capital city, Pierre. As of the 2020 census, the μSA had a population of 20,750 (though a July 1, 2023 estimate placed the population at 20,667). It is the smallest metropolitan or micropolitan statistical area in the U.S. to be centered on a state capital.

== Counties ==
- Hughes
- Stanley

== Communities ==
- Cities
  - Blunt
  - Fort Pierre
  - Pierre (Principal city)
- Towns
  - Harrold
- Unincorporated places
  - Canning
  - Hayes

== Demographics ==
As of the census of 2000, there were 19,253 people, 7,623 households, and 5,085 families residing within the μSA. The racial makeup of the μSA was 89.51% White, 0.19% African American, 8.15% Native American, 0.38% Asian, 0.02% Pacific Islander, 0.29% from other races, and 1.46% from two or more races. Hispanic or Latino of any race were 1.11% of the population.

The median income for a household in the μSA was $42,070, and the median income for a family was $49,216. Males had a median income of $31,070 versus $21,777 for females. The per capita income for the μSA was $20,495.

== Transportation ==
=== Major highways ===
- US-14
- US-83
- SD-34
- SD-63
- SD-204
- SD-1804
- SD-1806

== See also ==
- South Dakota census statistical areas
