= Mary Duvall =

American politician

Member of the South Dakota House of Representatives from the 24th district
- Incumbent
- Assumed office January 11, 2013 Serving with Tim Rounds
- Preceded by: Tad Perry
- Succeeded by: Will Mortenson (elect); Mike Weisgram (elect)

Personal details
- Born: September 6, 1962 (age 63)
- Party: Republican
- Education: South Dakota State University (BS)
- Website: maryduvall.net

Mary Kay Duvall (born September 6, 1962) is an American politician and a Republican member of the South Dakota House of Representatives representing District 24 since January 11, 2013.

== Education ==
Duvall earned her BS in agricultural business from South Dakota State University.

== Elections ==
- 2012 When incumbent Republican Representative Tad Perry ran for South Dakota Senate and left a District 24 seat open, Duvall ran in the three-way June 5, 2012 Republican Primary and placed first with 2,414 votes (35.9%) ahead of incumbent Representative Mark Venner, who placed third; Duvall and fellow Republican nominee Tim Rounds were unopposed for the November 6, 2012 General election, where Rounds took the first seat and Duvall took the second seat with 6,154 votes (45.92%).
