= Abigail Abbot Bailey =

American memoirist (1746–1815)

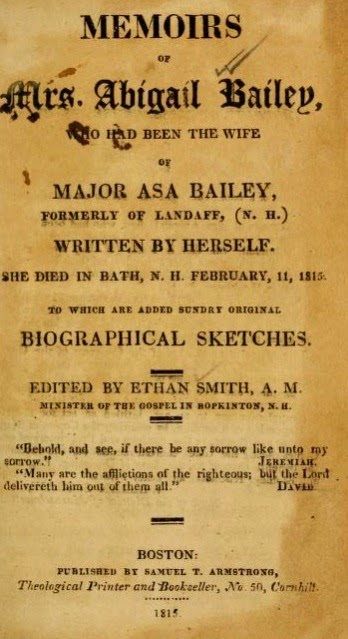
This is the original title page of Abigail Abbot Bailey's memoir. The memoir was published the same year that she died.

Abigail Abbot Bailey (1746–1815) was an early American memoirist who documented her experiences with domestic abuse and incest. She lived in Landaff, New Hampshire, and had 17 children with an abusive husband. Upon learning that her daughter was being sexually abused by her husband in 1788, she insisted that he leave their home and eventually secured a divorce in 1792. Her memoirs, published posthumously as Memoirs of Mrs. Abigail Bailey, Who Had Been the Wife of Major Asa Bailey, Formerly of Landaff, (N.H.) Written by Herself, were written as a conversion narrative for her Congregationalist church. The document details her husband's abuse during their 25-year marriage, including his incidences of adultery and his rape of their daughter.

== Early life and marriage ==
Abigail Abbot was born on February 2, 1746, in Rumford (now Concord, New Hampshire), to Sarah and James Abbot. Her father was a deacon. During her Puritan upbringing, she learned that wives honor and obey their husbands.

Abigail married a New Hampshire native, Major Asa Bailey in 1767. They purchased a farm in Landaff, New Hampshire. She soon discovered that he had a "hard, uneven, rash temper" and recounted physical abuse in their first month of marriage. The couple hired a woman to help in the household in 1770. Asa had apparently seduced the woman, and Abigail fired her and confronted him, demanding that he make repentance. He later committed adultery with another woman that they had hired in July 1773. She was charged in another incident and her relationship with Asa was given as evidence against her. The scandal was known throughout the community of Landaff.

From 1768 to 1791, the Baileys had 17 children.

== Incest, divorce and later life ==
Asa had a strong temper and was physically abusive. Much to Abigail's relief, he traveled west in 1788. He returned in December resolved to move the family to Ohio. He planned to establish a homestead and take two of their children with him, including Phebe, one of their eldest daughters. His actions seemed seductive to Abigail and he became defensive when she questioned him. Asa raped their fourth child, Phebe, beginning in 1788. Abigail may not have fully grasped the extent of the incestuous relationship, but made indirect attempts at stopping it. Phebe did not corroborate her mother's suspicions and left the home when she was 18.

Abigail started her memoirs sometime after 1789, after discovering her husband's abuse. She suffered health problems relating to childbirth, but after she gave birth to twins in 1790, she became insistent that the incestuous relationship end or she would be forced to petition for divorce. Phebe's siblings had seen their father assault her and finally told Abigail what had happened. Abigail went to see Phebe and she admitted to having been abused. Abigail's memoirs later describe the "fear, shame, and despair" that Phebe felt. On September 7, 1790, Abigail insisted that Asa leave their home. He left and promised to provide support for their children and divide their property.

Asa traded the Landaff farm for one in Bradford, Vermont, that belonged to his brother. The family moved to Bradford in February 1792 and the next month both Abigail and Asa left to travel to a buyer for the farm in Connecticut. Instead, Asa took her to Whitestown, New York, where he intended to settle. He had planned to get her to New York because the stricter laws meant that she would be less likely to procure a divorce. She was detained there for two months and Asa returned to Bradford to gather the children and sell their farm. Abigail, who was recovering from smallpox, pursued him. She arrived in Vermont in June and had a warrant sworn against her husband. At first, he refused to settle their property per the demands of the court, but Abigail's threats to take the matter to New Hampshire convinced him to relent. She was granted a divorce in 1792.

Unable to support her children, she found families with whom they could live. She lived in Piermont, New Hampshire, in housing provided by a deacon, Andrew Crook. She moved to Bath, New Hampshire, in 1804 to live with her son's family. She died of what was then called lung fever on February 11, 1815, in Bath.

== Memoirs ==
Abigail's memoirs were written as a conversion narrative for her Congregationalist church, and she never intended for them to be published. Following her death, the memoirs were brought by family and friends to the Reverend Ethan Smith of Haverhill, who had been the pastor of the church where she converted. The congregation and the pastor thought that the memoirs provided an example of faith in God despite the disgraceful actions of her husband. Smith edited and published the memoirs, writing that "few lives of christians, in modern days, have afforded such rare materials for instructive biography." Her memoirs were published as Memoirs of Mrs. Abigail Bailey, Who Had Been the Wife of Major Asa Bailey, Formerly of Landaff, (N.H.) Written by Herself. The memoirs are among few accounts of explicit domestic violence written by a woman in early America and may have been the first autobiographical account of incest published in the United States. Written in the style of a woman's religious autobiography, its tone and content place it within the tradition of American captivity narratives.

Religious studies scholar Ann Taves republished the memoirs as Religion and Domestic Violence: The Memoirs of Abigail Abbot Bailey in 1989.

== Bibliography ==
- Abigail Abbot Bailey, Memoirs of Mrs. Abigail Bailey, Who Had Been the Wife of Major Asa Bailey, Formerly of Landaff, (N.H.) Written by Herself Ed. Ethan Smith. (Boston: Samuel T. Armstrong, 1815).
