= Mark Venner =

American politician

Member of the South Dakota House of Representatives from the 24th district
- In office 2011–2012 Serving with Tad Perry
- Preceded by: Tim Rounds
- Succeeded by: Tim Rounds

Personal details
- Born: September 16, 1950 (age 75) Pierre, South Dakota
- Party: Republican
- Spouse: Denise
- Children: four
- Profession: Farmer

Mark Eugene Venner, Sr. (born September 16, 1950) is an American former politician. He has served as a Republican member for the 24th district in the South Dakota House of Representatives from 2011 to 2012. Previously, he served as Commissioner of Hughes County, South Dakota from 1999 to 2010.
