= Landaff, New Hampshire =

- Town
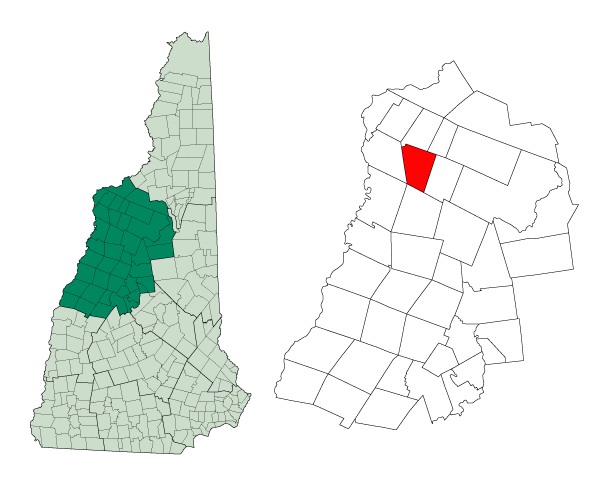
- Location in Grafton County, New Hampshire
- Coordinates: 44°09′18″N 71°52′45″W
- Country: United States
- State: New Hampshire
- County: Grafton
- Incorporated: 1774
- Villages: Landaff Center; Ireland; Jockey Hill

Area
  - Total: 28.48 sq mi (73.75 km^{2})
  - Land: 28.34 sq mi (73.40 km^{2})
  - Water: 0.14 sq mi (0.35 km^{2}) 0.48%
- Elevation: 1,283 ft (391 m)

Population (2020)
  - Total: 446
  - Density: 16/sq mi (6.1/km^{2})
- Time zone: UTC-5 (Eastern)
  - Summer (DST): UTC-4 (Eastern)
- ZIP codes: 03585 (Lisbon/Landaff); 03785 (Woodsville); 03580 (Franconia)
- Area code: 603
- FIPS code: 33-40660
- GNIS feature ID: 873641
- Website: www.landaffnh.org

Landaff is a town in Grafton County, New Hampshire, United States. As of the 2020 census, the town population was 446.

== History ==
The name on the town charter is "Llandaff", after the Bishop of Llandaff, chaplain to England's King George III. Originally, however, the land was granted as "Whitcherville" to James Avery and 60 others on January 31, 1764. But those settlers forfeited their grant by failure to comply with the requirements of the charter, so the territory was re-granted to Dartmouth College on January 19, 1770.

Settlements were made under the Dartmouth grant. Roads and a mill were built at the expense of the college, and on November 11, 1774, the town was incorporated. After the Revolutionary War, however, the first grantees successfully claimed that their forfeiture was illegal, so the college had to abandon its title and lose what it had expended in making the settlements.

Landaff was originally much larger than today. It was changed by legislative actions over the years:

- On July 2, 1845, it gained a small tract from the then-adjoining town of Lincoln.
- On June 23, 1859, all of Landaff lying northwest of the Ammonoosuc River was annexed to the town of Lisbon.
- On July 20, 1876, the town was divided, with the eastern half becoming the town of Easton.

The Lisbon Area Historical Society promotes the public's interest in and appreciation for the towns of Lisbon, Landaff and Lyman, and maintains the collection, preservation and cataloging of materials which establish or illustrate the history of the three towns, their indigenous history and heritage, their exploration, settlement and development, as well as their cultural and artistic heritage.

== Geography ==
Landaff is in northwestern New Hampshire and northwestern Grafton County. It is 14 miles (23 km) by road southwest of Littleton and 9 miles (14 km) east-northeast of Woodsville.

According to the U.S. Census Bureau, the town has a total area of 28.5 square miles (73.8 km^{2}), of which 28.3 square miles (73.4 km^{2}) are land and 0.2 square miles (0.4 km^{2}) are water, comprising 0.48% of the town. The highest point in Landaff is the summit of Moody Ledge in the south-central part of town, at 2,326 feet (709 m) above sea level. The Ammonoosuc River defines part of the northwestern boundary of the town, and the Wild Ammonoosuc River flows through the southern part of the town. Landaff lies fully within the Connecticut River watershed.

The southern half of the town is in the White Mountain National Forest, accessible via Cobble Hill Trail and Ore Hill Trail from the north. Natural features of Landaff include many viewsheds, mountain summits, wetlands, undeveloped woodland and farm land. The main bodies of water in town are Chandler Pond, Jericho Pond and Gordon Pond.

== Demographics ==
Historical population
Census	Pop.	Note	%±
1790	292		—
1800	461		57.9%
1810	650		41.0%
1820	769		18.3%
1830	951		23.7%
1840	957		0.6%
1850	948		−0.9%
1860	1,012		6.8%
1870	882		−12.8%
1880	506		−42.6%
1890	499		−1.4%
1900	500		0.2%
1910	526		5.2%
1920	510		−3.0%
1930	469		−8.0%
1940	389		−17.1%
1950	342		−12.1%
1960	289		−15.5%
1970	292		1.0%
1980	266		−8.9%
1990	350		31.6%
2000	378		8.0%
2010	415		9.8%
2020	446		7.5%
U.S. Decennial Census

As of the census of 2000, there were 378 people, 154 households, and 107 families residing in the town. The population density was 13.3 inhabitants per square mile (5.1/km^{2}). There were 214 housing units at an average density of 7.5 per square mile (2.9/km^{2}). The racial makeup of the town was 96.56% White, 0.26% Native American, and 3.17% from two or more races. Hispanic or Latino of any race were 0.79% of the population.

There were 154 households, out of which 29.2% had children under the age of 18 living with them, 61.7% were married couples living together, 6.5% had a female householder with no husband present, and 29.9% were non-families. 21.4% of all households were made up of individuals, and 11.0% had someone living alone who was 65 years of age or older. The average household size was 2.45 and the average family size was 2.88.

In the town, the population was spread out, with 23.8% under the age of 18, 5.6% from 18 to 24, 27.0% from 25 to 44, 28.8% from 45 to 64, and 14.8% who were 65 years of age or older. The median age was 42 years. For every 100 females, there were 93.8 males. For every 100 females age 18 and over, there were 95.9 males.

The median income for a household in the town was $41,964, and the median income for a family was $48,500. Males had a median income of $35,156 versus $23,438 for females. The per capita income for the town was $18,033. About 6.9% of families and 7.1% of the population were below the poverty line, including 5.7% of those under age 18 and 12.9% of those age 65 or over.

== Notable people ==
- Abigail Abbot Bailey (1746–1815), memoirist
- Harry Chandler (1864–1944), newspaper publisher, real estate investor
- Mary Noyes Farr (1853–1938), physician, educator, later based South Dakota
- Samuel H. Roys (1821–1857), Wisconsin politician
