= Patricia de Hueck =

American politician

Member of the South Dakota Senate from the 24th district
- In office January 9, 2001 – January 11, 2005
- Preceded by: Mike Rounds
- Succeeded by: Bob Gray

Member of the South Dakota House of Representatives from the 24th district
- In office January 14, 1997 – January 12, 1999
- Succeeded by: Cooper Garnos

Personal details
- Born: September 6, 1952 (age 74) Sioux City, Iowa
- Party: Republican

Patricia de Hueck (born September 6, 1952) is an American politician who served in the South Dakota House of Representatives from the 24th district from 1997 to 1999 and in the South Dakota Senate from the 24th district from 2001 to 2005.
