= Samuel H. Roys =

American politician (1821–1857)

Member of the Wisconsin State Assembly
- In office 1848–1849

Personal details
- Born: September 5, 1821 Landaff, New Hampshire, U.S.
- Died: August 18, 1857 (aged 35)
- Party: Democratic
- Occupation: Politician

Samuel H. Roys (September 5, 1821 – August 18, 1857) was an American politician who served as a member of the Wisconsin State Assembly.

== Biography ==
Roys was born on September 5, 1821, in Landaff, New Hampshire. He later lived in Stoughton, Wisconsin. He died of dysentery on August 18, 1857.

== Career ==
Roys was a member of the Assembly during the 1848 and 1849 sessions. Later, he was elected District Attorney of Dane County, Wisconsin in 1852. Roys was elected to be a judge on the Dane County Bench in 1857, but died before he could take office. He was a Democrat.
