= Ann Taves =

- Born: 1952 (age 73–74)
- Spouse: Raymond Paloutzian (m. 2007)
- Awards: Guggenheim Fellowship

Academic background
- Education: Pomona College; University of Chicago

Academic work
- Discipline: Religious studies
- Institutions: University of California, Santa Barbara
- Notable works: Fits, Trances and Visions (1999)

Ann Taves (born 1952) is Distinguished Professor of Religious Studies at the University of California, Santa Barbara. She is a former president of the American Academy of Religion (2010). From July 2005–December 2017, she held the Cordana Chair in Catholic Studies at UC Santa Barbara. Taves is especially known for her work Religious Experience Reconsidered (2009), stressing the importance of the findings and theoretical foundations of cognitive science for modern religionists.

== Early life and education ==
Taves was born in 1952. She received her bachelor's degree in religion from Pomona College in June 1974. She went on to earn her master's and doctorate degrees from the University of Chicago Divinity School in June 1979 and December 1983, respectively.

== Career ==
Taves taught at Claremont School of Theology and Claremont Graduate University from 1983-2005. In 2005 she was appointed to the faculty of UC Santa Barbara, as the Virgil Cordano OFM Chair in Catholic Studies, a position she held until 2017. She is currently Research Professor and Distinguished Professor Emerita of Religious Studies at UCSB,

In 2013, Taves received a Guggenheim Fellowship in the field of religion.

In March 2018, she gave the Gunning lecture at New College, Edinburgh on the topic "Religion as worldviews and as ways of life."

== Personal life ==
Taves married Raymond Paloutzian on 29 December 2007, in Santa Barbara.

== Works ==
=== Fits, Trances, and Visions ===
Fits, Trances, and Visions (1999) charts the experience of Anglo-American Protestants and those who left the Protestant movement beginning with the transatlantic awakening in the early 18th century and ending with the rise of the psychology of religion and the birth of Pentecostalism in the early 20th century.

It charts the synonymic language of trance in the American Christian traditions: power or presence or indwelling of God, or Christ, or the Spirit, or spirits. Typical expressions include "the indwelling of the Spirit" (Jonathan Edwards), "the witness of the Spirit" (John Wesley), "the power of God" (early American Methodists), being "filled with the Spirit of the Lord" (early Adventists; see charismatic Adventism), "communing with spirits" (Spiritualists), "the Christ within" (New Thought), "streams of holy fire and power" (Methodist holiness), "a religion of the Spirit and Power" (the Emmanuel Movement), and "the baptism of the Holy Spirit" (early Pentecostals).

It focuses on a class of seemingly involuntary acts alternately explained in religious and secular terminology. These involuntary experiences include uncontrolled bodily movements (fits, bodily exercises, falling as dead, catalepsy, convulsions); spontaneous vocalizations (crying out, shouting, speaking in tongues); unusual sensory experiences (trances, visions, voices, clairvoyance, out-of-body experiences); and alterations of consciousness and/or memory (dreams, somnium, somnambulism, mesmeric trance, mediumistic trance, hypnotism, possession, alternating personality).

=== Religion and Domestic Violence ===
Taves's 1989 book, Religion and Domestic Violence: The Memoirs of Abigail Abbot Bailey, republished the memoirs of Abigail Abbot Bailey.

=== Other works ===
- The Household of Faith: Roman Catholic Devotions in Mid-Nineteenth Century America (Notre Dame, 1986 [hc], 1990 [pb]).
- Religion and Domestic Violence: The Memoirs of Abigail Abbot Bailey (Indiana University Press, 1989)
- Fits, Trances and Visions: Experiencing Religion and Explaining Experience from Wesley to James (Princeton University Press, 1999)
- Religious Experience Reconsidered: A Building Block Approach to the Study of Religion and Other Special Things (Princeton University Press, 2009)
- What Matters: Ethnographies of Value in the (Not So) Secular Age, co-edited with Courtney Bender (Columbia, 2012)
- Revelatory Events: Three Case Studies of the Emergence of New Spiritual Paths (Princeton University Press, 2016) ISBN 1400884462

== See also ==
- Cognitive science of religion
- Scholarly approaches to mysticism
- Temporal lobe epilepsy
