= Religious Experience Reconsidered =

Book by Ann Taves

- Author: Ann Taves
- Subject: religious experience
- Publication date: 2009

Religious Experience Reconsidered (2009) is a book by Ann Taves on the study of religious experience. She proposes a new approach, which takes into account the attribution of religious meaning to specific events, using the term "specialness." "The focus of the book is on experiences deemed religious (and, by extension, other things considered special) rather than "religious experience.""

== Reception ==
Kim Knott calls Taves approach an encompassing framework, which can take into account a multitude of things. She doubts, though, if the term "specialness" can replace the term "sacredness."

== See also ==
- Mystical experience

== Sources ==
- Knott, Kim (2010), "Specialness and the sacred: Ann Taves, Religious Experience Reconsidered", Religion, 40 (4): 305–307, doi:10.1016/j.religion.2010.09.007
- Taves, Ann (2009), Religious Experience Reconsidered: A Building Block Approach to the Study of Religion and Other Special Things, Princeton University Press
