= Pierre School District =

School district in South Dakota, United States

Address
- 211 S Poplar Avenue Pierre, South Dakota, 57501; United States

District information
- Type: Public
- Grades: K–12
- NCES District ID: 4655260

Students and staff
- Students: 2,771
- Teachers: 171.46
- Staff: 200.54
- Student–teacher ratio: 16.16

Other information
- Website: www.pierre.k12.sd.us

Pierre School District #32-2 is a school district headquartered in Pierre, South Dakota.

The district serves Pierre and Oahe Acres.

== History ==
In 2020 the district passed a 4% pay raise for teachers.

In 2021 the district hired 29 new teachers, with 24 of them filling in for teachers who had left.

== Schools ==
Secondary

- T. F. Riggs High School
- Georgia Morse Middle School

Elementary

- Buchanan
- Jefferson
- Kennedy
