= Raber Township, Hughes County, South Dakota =

Township in Hughes County, South Dakota

Coordinates: 44.3011°N 99.8342°W

Raber Township is a township in Hughes County, in the U.S. state of South Dakota. Its population was 26 as of the 2010 census.
