= Oahe Acres, South Dakota =

- Census-designated place
- Location within South Dakota Location within the United States
- Coordinates: 44°27′53″N 100°20′42″W
- Country: United States
- State: South Dakota
- County: Hughes

Area
  - Total: 1.32 sq mi (3.42 km^{2})
  - Land: 1.32 sq mi (3.42 km^{2})
  - Water: 0 sq mi (0.00 km^{2})
- Elevation: 1,729 ft (527 m)

Population (2020)
  - Total: 503
  - Density: 380.8/sq mi (147.03/km^{2})
- Time zone: UTC-6 (Central (CST))
  - Summer (DST): UTC-5 (CDT)
- ZIP Code: 57501 (Pierre)
- Area code: 605
- FIPS code: 46-46240
- GNIS feature ID: 2813032

Oahe Acres is an unincorporated community and census-designated place (CDP) in Hughes County, South Dakota, United States. It was first listed as a CDP prior to the 2020 census. The population of the CDP was 503 at the 2020 census.

It is in the northwest part of the county, 7 miles (11 km) north of Pierre, the state capital, and 2 miles (3 km) east of Oahe Dam on the Missouri River.

== Demographics ==
Historical population
Census	Pop.	Note	%±
2020	503		—
U.S. Decennial Census
