= Karcher Block =

- U.S. National Register of Historic Places
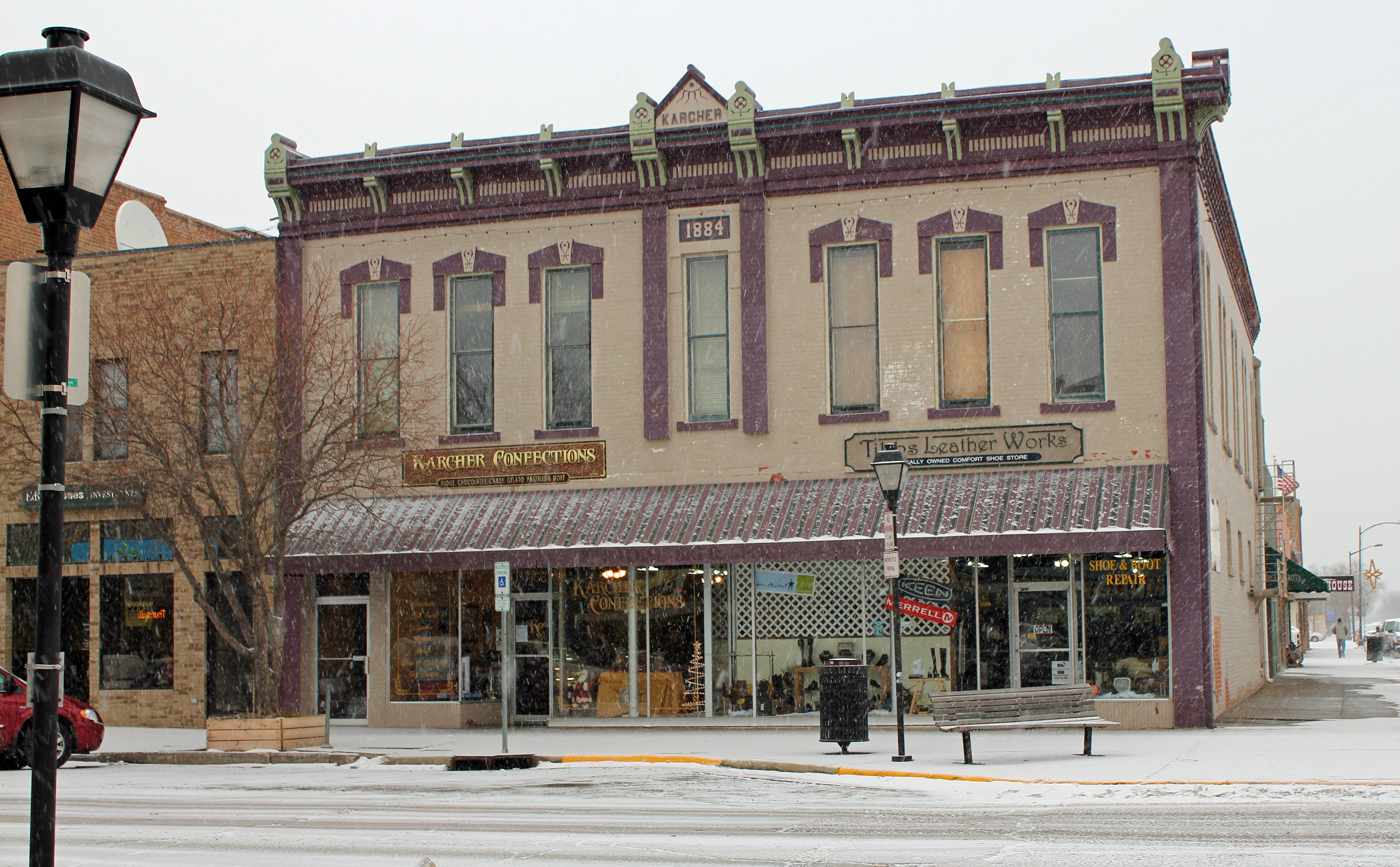

- Location within South Dakota Location within the United States
- Location: 366 S. Pierre St., Pierre, South Dakota
- Coordinates: 44°21′57″N 100°21′16″W
- Area: less than one acre
- Architect: Proudfoot & Bird
- Architectural style: Italianate
- NRHP reference No.: 93000783
- Added to NRHP: August 17, 1993

The Karcher Block is a historic commercial building located at 366 S. Pierre St. in Pierre, South Dakota. Businessman Henry Karcher commissioned the Italianate building in 1884. It was an early work of architects Proudfoot & Bird, then of Pierre but better known for their work elsewhere. Before Karcher constructed his building, Pierre did not have an established commercial center. An East Pierre landowner offered Karcher $6,000 to build his commercial block there, but Karcher turned down the offer and built in West Pierre. Due to the Karcher Block and the Central Block, another major commercial building, West Pierre became Pierre's main business district. The block has continuously housed businesses since its construction.

The building was added to the National Register of Historic Places on August 17, 1993.
