= Farr House =

Historic house in South Dakota, United States

The Farr House is a historic three-story house located at 106 E. Wynoka St. in Pierre, South Dakota.

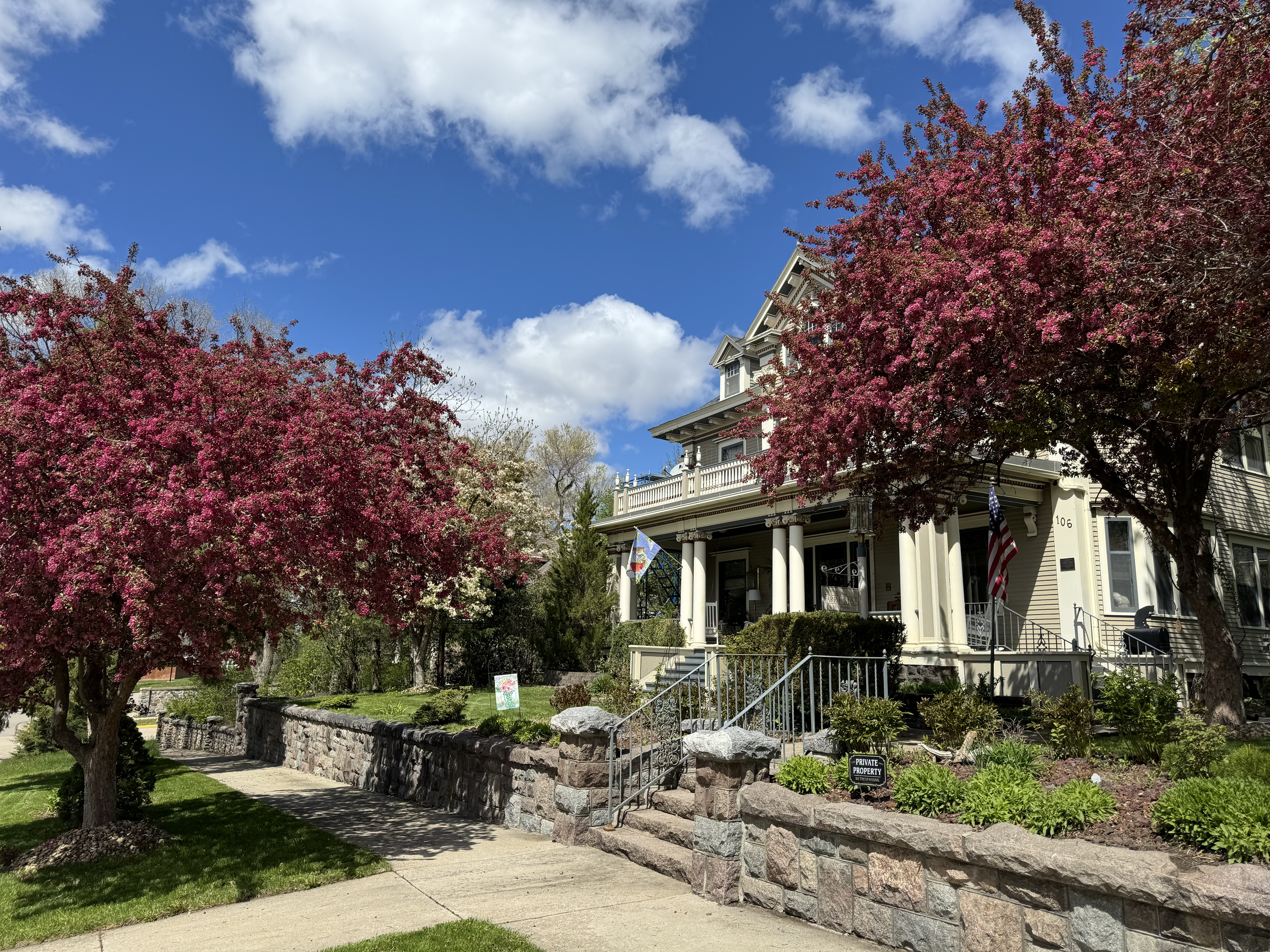
Exterior of Farr Residence

Construction began in 1909, as reported in the Pierre Weekly Free Press in April of that year, which described it as destined to be "one of the finest residences in Pierre when completed." The house was designed by architect E. J. Donohue of the Gilfillan Block, St. Paul, Minnesota, in the Colonial Revival style. Donohue's design exhibits Georgian and Adamesque influences and features Ionic columns on the porch, two-story Ionic pilasters at the front corners, Palladian windows, and a dentillated cornice. The house's first owner, Colonel E. P. Farr, was a veteran and banker; his wife, Mary Noyes Farr, was one of the first female doctors in Pierre. Peter Norbeck later lived in the house during his term as Governor of South Dakota, and Governor Carl Gunderson also lived in the house for a short time. The house is a single-family residence that has rooms available on Airbnb.

The house was added to the National Register of Historic Places on December 4, 1980.

== Construction and materials ==
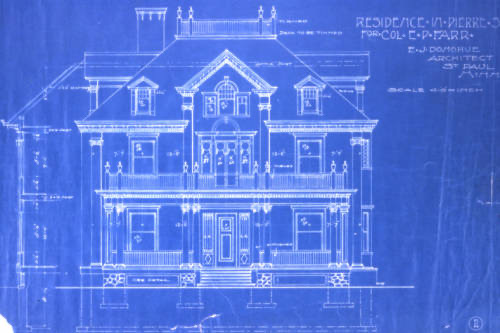
Farr Residence Elevation Plans

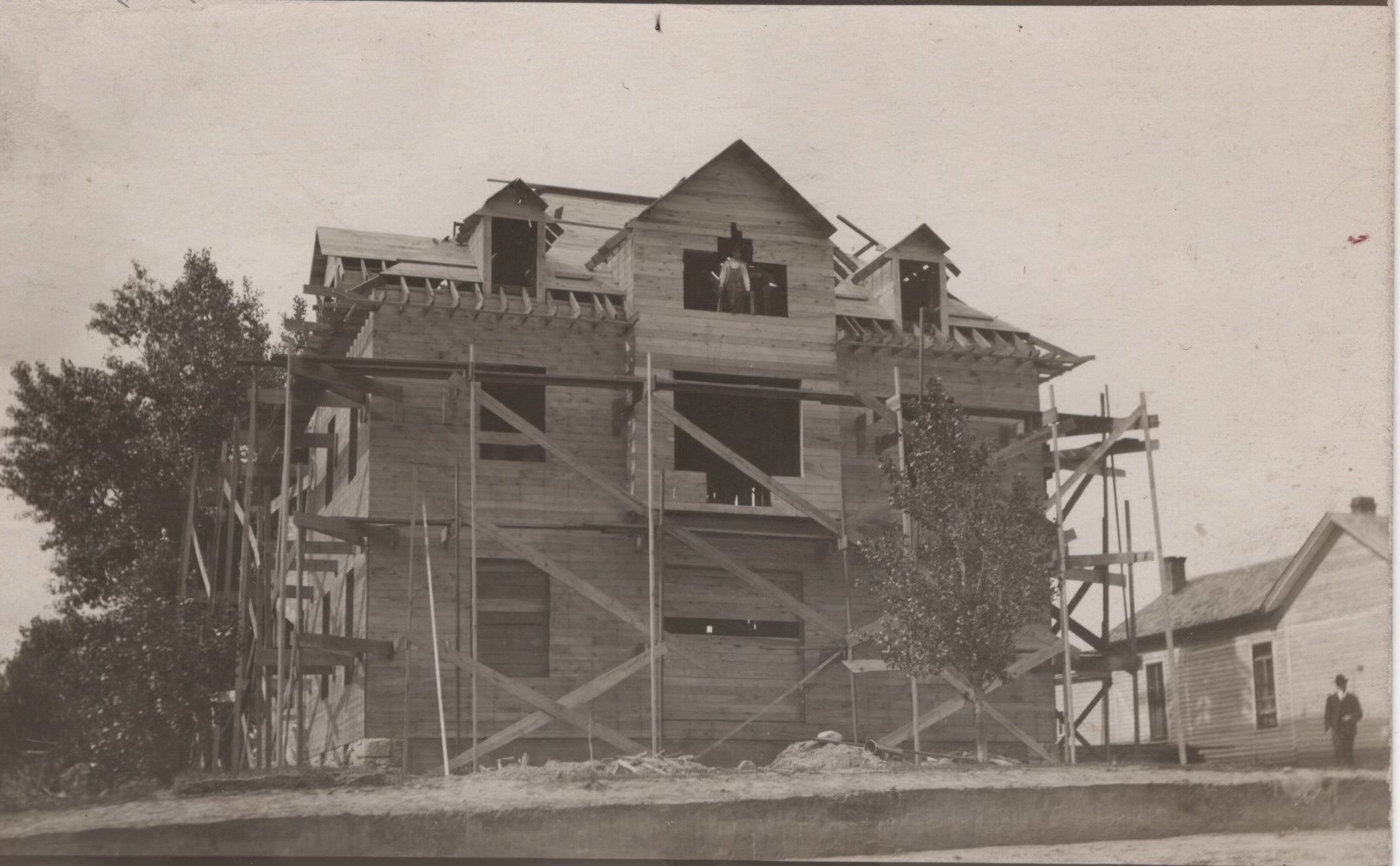
Farr Residence Being Constructed

The original building specifications, prepared by Donohue, call for a foundation of poured concrete footings with walls above the grade line built of split granite boulders laid in Portland cement mortar, with face joints neatly pointed and interstices filled with chips. The basement floor was to be finished with cement sidewalk tile. The frame structure rests on steel beams and cast iron columns. The exterior was clad in clear white pine or fir lap siding and roofed with Extra "Star A Star" cedar shingles over "Tiger Brand" building paper, with Taylor Old Style tin roofing on the porches and veranda. The chimneys, rising from concrete footings, were built of hard-burned common brick and faced above the roof line with light gray Columbus pressed brick in Pecora colored mortar.

== Interior ==
The interior woodwork was specified to the highest standard of the period. The main staircase was built of number one clear white oak, with turned balusters and a hand rail hung on iron brackets; the staircase walls were wainscoted in white oak. A secondary rear staircase was also built in white oak, while the attic stairs were white pine. First-floor rooms received maple flooring, with birch on the upper floor of the second story and maple in the attic. A layer of "Linofelt" deadening quilt was laid beneath the second-story and attic floors for sound insulation.

The living room, library, dining room, office, and main halls featured detailed hardwood casing and base moldings finished in oil, with oak surfaces treated with Blood's Paste Filler and Ogden's Interior Finish. Every room and hallway throughout the building was fitted with picture molding, and the dining room received a full birch plate rail. A bevelled plate glass mirror panel was incorporated into one of the interior doors.

The house included a number of notable domestic features: a built-in vestibule seat of white oak; a dining room window seat veneered in birch; a china closet with four dovetailed drawers and adjustable birch shelves; and a well-appointed pantry stocked with cupboards, drawers, flour bins, lockers, and galvanized iron spice boxes. A laundry chute connected the upper floors to the laundry. A cold closet with seven shelves and a dedicated cabinet in both the first-floor lavatory and second-floor toilet room rounded out the service spaces. An annunciator bell system, wired from the kitchen to the front and rear doors, dining room, all chambers, bathrooms, and the second-story main hall, allowed communication throughout the house. Full-size storm sash glazed with S.A. glass, hung on Schroeder Invisible Hangers, were provided for all windows, along with matching full-size fly screens.

== Veranda and balcony ==
The veranda featured turned columns with composition caps, a detailed balustrade with 3¾-inch turned balusters set three inches apart, and a balcony enclosed with heavy-grade fly screen. Porch and balcony floors were laid in clear white pine with white lead in the joints; ceilings were yellow pine. The veranda roof was covered in Taylor Old Style Tin.

== Historical significance ==
In 1915, a state legislative proposal to purchase the Farr house for use as a governor's residence—valued at $17,000—was killed on a roll call vote after amendments attempted to substitute it for a competing stone property. The house was later occupied by Governor Peter Norbeck during his term and briefly by Governor Carl Gunderson.
