= Karen Raber =

Shakespeare scholar

Karen Raber is an American academic specialising in the study of Shakespeare. She is Distinguished Professor of English at the University of Mississippi and served from 2018-2026 as the Executive Director of the Shakespeare Association of America. She researches and writes on Shakespeare, animal studies, ecocriticism, and posthumanism.

== Education ==
Raber received her Ph.D. in Literature and her M.A. in English from the University of California, San Diego, and her B.A. from Yale University.

== Bibliography ==
- Shakespeare and Animals: A Dictionary (Bloomsbury 2022)
- The Routledge Handbook of Shakespeare and Animals (Routledge 2020)
- Shakespeare and Posthumanist Theory (Bloomsbury 2018)
- Performing Animals: History, Agency, Theater (Penn State University Press 2017)
- Animal Bodies, Renaissance Culture (UPenn Press 2013)
- The Cultural History of Women: Vol. 3, The Renaissance (Bloomsbury 2013)
- Early Modern Ecostudies: From the Florentine Codex to Shakespeare (Palgrave 2009)
- Ashgate Critical Essays on Women Writers in England, 1550-1700, Vol. 6, Elizabeth Cary (Ashgate 2009)
- The Culture of the Horse: Status, Discipline, and Identity in the Early Modern World (Palgrave 2005)
- Dramatic Difference: Gender, Class and Genre in the Early Modern Closet Drama (Delaware 2001)
