= Hilger Block =

- U.S. National Register of Historic Places
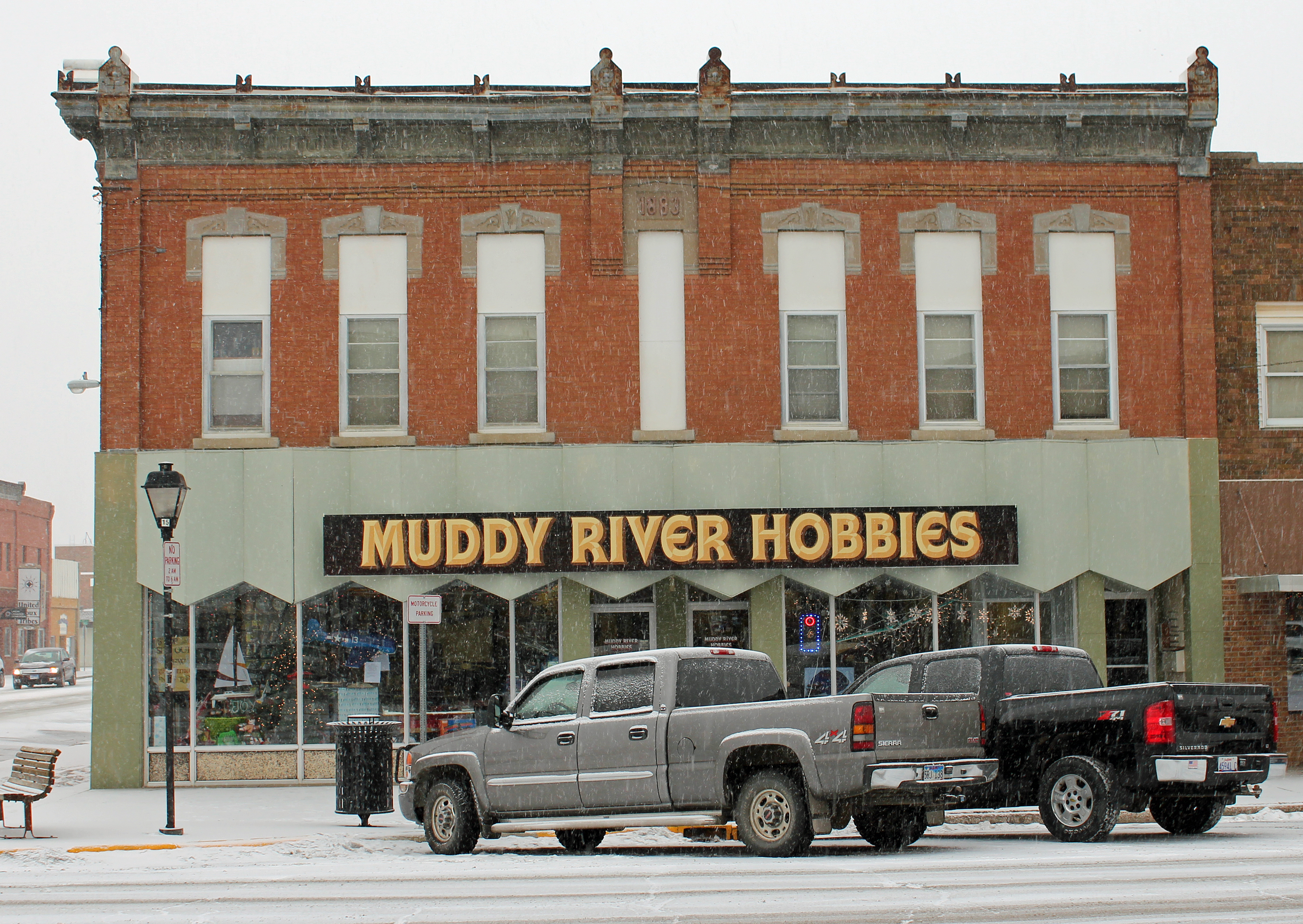

- Location within South Dakota Location within the United States
- Location: 361 S. Pierre, Pierre, South Dakota
- Coordinates: 44°22′5″N 100°21′19″W
- Area: less than one acre
- Built: 1883
- Architectural style: Italianate
- NRHP reference No.: 06000456
- Added to NRHP: May 31, 2006

The Hilger Block is a historic commercial building located at 361 S. Pierre St. in Pierre, South Dakota. J.D. Hilger built the building in 1883 to use as a clothing store. The building was the first brick commercial block in Pierre. The building was designed in the Italianate style and features a bracketed cornice with dentils and moldings, long and narrow windows with ornamental hoods, and a flat parapet along the roofline. As West Pierre became the main business district of Pierre, the Hilger Block became a desirable location for businesses; by 1890, it had twelve tenants, with businesses on the first floor and professional offices on the second.

The building was added to the National Register of Historic Places on May 31, 2006.
