= Karcher–Sahr House =

Historic house in South Dakota, United States

- U.S. National Register of Historic Places
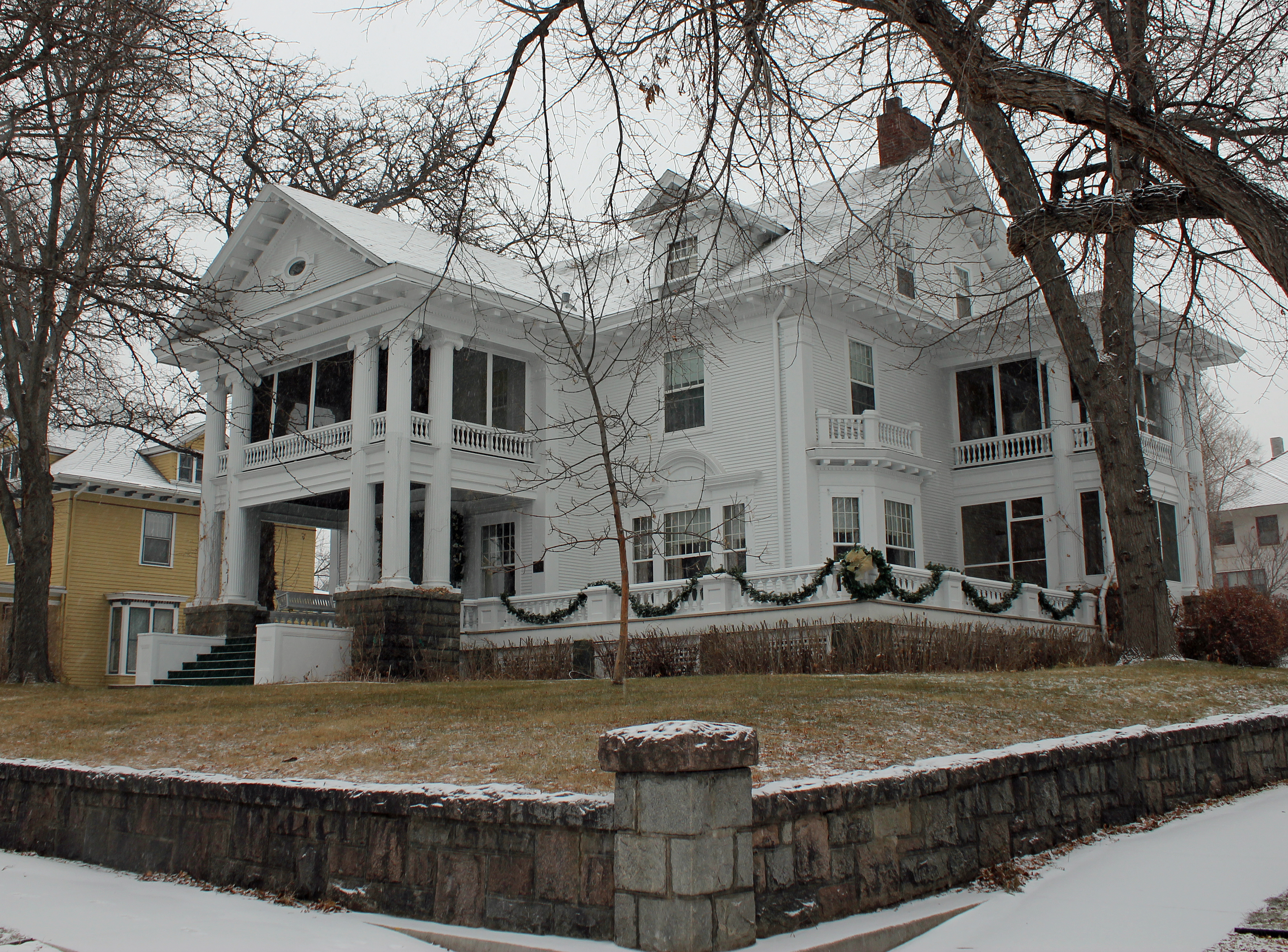

- Location within South Dakota Location within the United States
- Location: 222 E. Prospect St., Pierre, South Dakota
- Coordinates: 44°22′9″N 100°20′45″W
- Area: less than one acre
- Built: 1910
- Architect: Saxton, Glenn L.
- Architectural style: Classical Revival
- NRHP reference No.: 77001246
- Added to NRHP: September 22, 1977

The Karcher–Sahr House is a historic house located at 222 E. Prospect St. in Pierre, South Dakota. Built in 1910, the house was designed in the Classical Revival style. The house's design features a dentillated cornice with modillions and moldings, two-story Ionic columns supporting a pediment over the front entrance, and a front and side porch. The house's first owner, Henry Karcher, was an early settler and businessman in Pierre who also served as the city's mayor. After his daughter Marguerite married Fred Sahr, the couple lived in the house. Marguerite was a prominent activist for women's suffrage, and her son William was a state legislator.

The house was added to the National Register of Historic Places on September 22, 1977.
