= Bob Gray (South Dakota politician) =

American politician

Member of the South Dakota Senate from the 24th district
- In office 2005–2012
- Preceded by: Patricia de Hueck
- Succeeded by: Jeff Monroe

Personal details
- Born: September 6, 1971 (age 54)
- Party: Republican

Robert Gray (born September 6, 1971) is an American former politician. He served in the South Dakota Senate from 2005 to 2012. From 2007 to 2012, he served as President pro tempore of the Senate.
