= Raymond Paloutzian =

Raymond F. Paloutzian
- Born: June 6, 1945 (age 80); Fresno, California
- Occupation(s): Author and professor of Psychology
- Employer: Westmont College
- Spouse: Ann Taves
- Website: Faculty page

Raymond F. Paloutzian is a professor of psychology (emeritus) at Westmont College in Santa Barbara, California. For many years he edited the International Journal for the Psychology of Religion. Paloutzian's main fields of scholarship are social psychology and the psychology of religion. In the latter he is the author of an introductory textbook, and the lead editor of two handbooks.

== Biography ==
Raymond Frank Paloutzian was born on 6 June 1945 in Fresno, California.

Paloutzian received a PhD in 1972 in Social Psychology from Claremont Graduate University.

Paloutzian was married to Ann Taves on 29 December 2007, in Santa Barbara.

== Selected works ==
- Paloutzian, Raymond F. (1996). Invitation to the psychology of religion (2nd ed.). Boston, MA: Allyn and Bacon. ISBN 9780205148400. OCLC 782314263.

- Paloutzian, Raymond F. (1983). Invitation to the psychology of religion (1st ed.). Glenview, IL: Scott, Foresman & co. ISBN 9780673153432. OCLC 9324047.

- Paloutzian, Raymond F.; Park, Crystal L., eds. (2013). Handbook of the psychology of religion and spirituality (2nd ed.). New York, NY: Guilford. ISBN 9781462510061. OCLC 846740390.

- Paloutzian, Raymond F.; Park, Crystal L., eds. (2005). Handbook of the psychology of religion and spirituality (1st ed.). New York, NY: Guilford. ISBN 9781572309227. OCLC 60589100.
