= Brink–Wegner House =

Historic house in South Dakota, United States

- U.S. National Register of Historic Places
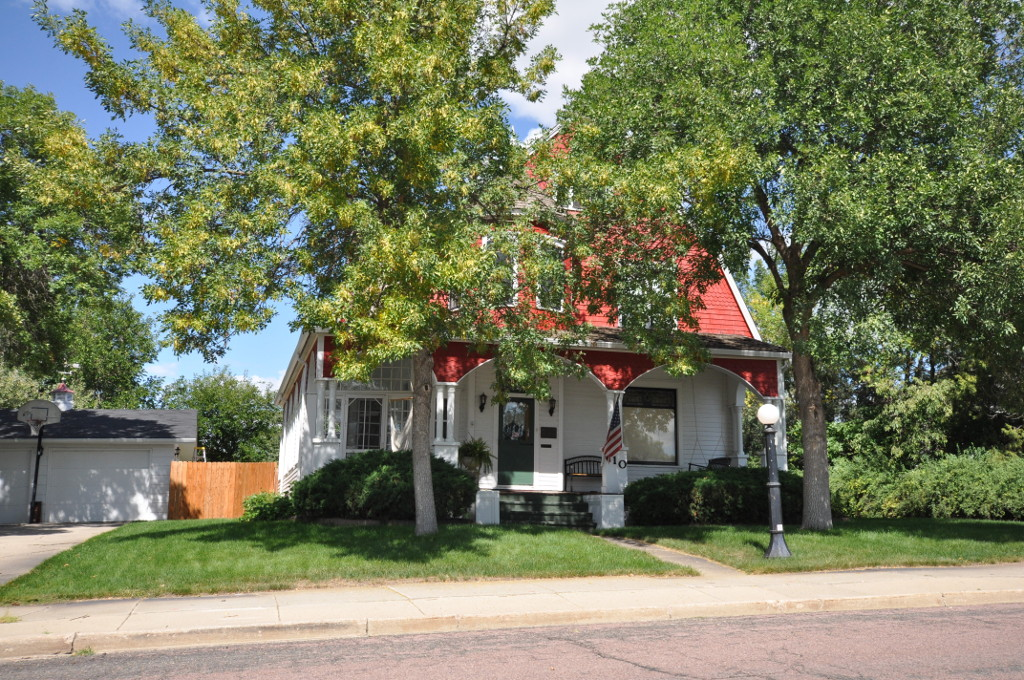

- Location within South Dakota Location within the United States
- Location: 110 E. 4th St., Pierre, South Dakota
- Coordinates: 44°22′44″N 100°20′56″W
- Area: less than one acre
- Built: 1904
- Architectural style: Shingle style
- NRHP reference No.: 78002557
- Added to NRHP: April 26, 1978

The Brink–Wegner House is a historic house located at 110 E. 4th St. in Pierre, South Dakota. The house was built in 1904 for Andrew C. Brink, a real estate contractor. The house's Shingle style design features a gambrel roof and a bay window with a cone-shaped roof on the second floor. Four different shingle designs are used to side the house above the first floor. The house's dining room features a mural on the ceiling, part of an interior the National Park Service called "one of the best period interiors in the State". In 1923, Henry C. Wegner, who owned the state's first automobile agency, bought the home. The house was moved from 109 South Highland Avenue to its current location in 1977.

The house was added to the National Register of Historic Places on April 26, 1978.
