= Canning, South Dakota =

Unincorporated community in South Dakota, U.S.

Coordinates: 44°23′47″N 100°01′55″W

Canning is an unincorporated community in Hughes County, in the U.S. state of South Dakota.

== History ==
Canning was platted in 1884. The community was named for George Canning, a British statesman who served as Prime Minister of the United Kingdom. A post office was established as Canning in 1883, and remained in operation until it was discontinued in 1972.
