= Kent Juhnke =

American politician

Member of the South Dakota House of Representatives
- In office 1999–2004, 2007–2011

Member of the South Dakota Senate from the 21st district
- In office 2011–2012
- Preceded by: Cooper Garnos
- Succeeded by: Billie Sutton

Personal details
- Born: January 15, 1955 (age 71) Pierre, South Dakota, U.S.
- Party: Republican
- Spouse: Sandy
- Children: three
- Education: South Dakota State University
- Profession: farmer, rancher

Kent D. Juhnke (born January 15, 1955) is an American former politician. He served in the South Dakota Senate from 2011 to 2012 and in the House from 1999 to 2004 and 2007 to 2011.
