= Michael H. Shaw =

American politician

Member of the South Dakota House of Representatives
- In office 1989–1994

Personal details
- Born: July 21, 1924 Pierre, South Dakota, U.S.
- Died: December 9, 2019 (aged 95)
- Party: Republican
- Education: University of South Dakota; Huron College

Michael H. Shaw (July 21, 1924 – December 9, 2019) was an American politician. He served as a Republican member of the South Dakota House of Representatives.

== Life and career ==
Shaw was born in Pierre, South Dakota. He attended the University of South Dakota and Huron College.

Shaw served in the South Dakota House of Representatives from 1989 to 1994.

Shaw died on December 9, 2019, at the age of 95.
