= Harrold, South Dakota =

- Town
- Location in Hughes County and the state of South Dakota

- Location in the United States
- Coordinates: 44°31′33″N 99°44′30″W
- Country: United States
- State: South Dakota
- County: Hughes
- Incorporated: 1886

Area
  - Total: 0.41 sq mi (1.07 km^{2})
  - Land: 0.41 sq mi (1.07 km^{2})
  - Water: 0 sq mi (0.00 km^{2})
- Elevation: 1,791 ft (546 m)

Population (2020)
  - Total: 101
  - Density: 245.1/sq mi (94.63/km^{2})
- Time zone: UTC-6 (Central (CST))
  - Summer (DST): UTC-5 (CDT)
- ZIP code: 57536
- Area code: 605
- FIPS code: 46-27420
- GNIS feature ID: 1267412
- Website: harroldsd.com

Harrold is a town in Hughes County, South Dakota, United States. It is part of the Pierre, South Dakota Micropolitan Statistical Area. The population was 101 at the 2020 census.

== History ==
The first settlement at Harrold was made in 1881. A post office was established as Harold in 1882, and the name was changed to Harrold in 1890. The town was named in honor of a railroad official.

In 2002, the only graduate of Harrold High School that year, April Kleinschmidt, was on The Late Show with David Letterman.

== Geography ==
According to the United States Census Bureau, the town has a total area of 0.27 square miles (0.70 km^{2}), all land.

== Demographics ==
Historical population
| Census | Pop. | Note | %± |
|---|---|---|---|
| 1900 | 57 | | — |
| 1910 | 230 | | 303.5% |
| 1920 | 252 | | 9.6% |
| 1930 | 309 | | 22.6% |
| 1940 | 229 | | −25.9% |
| 1950 | 263 | | 14.8% |
| 1960 | 255 | | −3.0% |
| 1970 | 184 | | −27.8% |
| 1980 | 196 | | 6.5% |
| 1990 | 167 | | −14.8% |
| 2000 | 209 | | 25.1% |
| 2010 | 124 | | −40.7% |
| 2020 | 101 | | −18.5% |
U.S. Decennial Census

=== 2010 census ===
As of the census of 2010, there were 124 people, 57 households, and 36 families residing in the town. The population density was 459.3 inhabitants per square mile (177.3/km^{2}). There were 74 housing units at an average density of 274.1 per square mile (105.8/km^{2}). The racial makeup of the town was 95.2% White, 0.8% African American, 1.6% Native American, and 2.4% from two or more races.

There were 57 households, of which 26.3% had children under the age of 18 living with them, 50.9% were married couples living together, 1.8% had a female householder with no husband present, 10.5% had a male householder with no wife present, and 36.8% were non-families. 28.1% of all households comprised individuals [be precise, what is meant by the term "individual"], and 12.3% had someone 65 or older living alone. The average household size was 2.18 and the average family size was 2.64.

The median age in the town was 49.8 years. 19.4% of residents were under 18, 3.9% were between 18 and 24, 18.6% were 25 to 44, 39.6% were 45 to 64, and 18.5% were 65 or older. The town's gender makeup was 50.8% male and 49.2% female.

=== 2000 census ===
As of the census of 2000, there were 209 people, 83 households, and 49 families residing in the town. The population density was 786.0 inhabitants per square mile (303.5/km^{2}). There were 90 housing units at an average density of 338.5 per square mile (130.7/km^{2}). The racial makeup of the town was 98.56% White, 0.48% Native American, and 0.96% from two or more races. Hispanic or Latino of any race were 2.87% of the population.

There were 83 households, out of which 33.7% had children under 18 living with them, 55.4% were married couples living together, 2.4% had a female householder with no husband present, and 39.8% were non-families. 37.3% of all households comprised individuals, and 22.9% had someone who was 65 or older living alone. The average household size was 2.52, and the average family size was 3.46.

In the town, the population was spread out, with 32.1% under the age of 18, 5.3% from 18 to 24, 28.2% from 25 to 44, 17.7% from 45 to 64, and 16.7% who were 65 years of age or older. The median age was 35 years. For every 100 females, there were 91.7 males. For every 100 females age 18 and over, there were 94.5 males.

The median income for a household in the town was $27,083, and the median income for a family was $36,071. Males had a median income of $29,375, versus $21,667 for females. The town's per capita income was $14,725. About 6.0% of families and 8.8% of the population were below the poverty line, including 5.1% of those under eighteen and 22.2% of those 65 or over.
