= Central Block (Pierre, South Dakota) =

- U.S. National Register of Historic Places
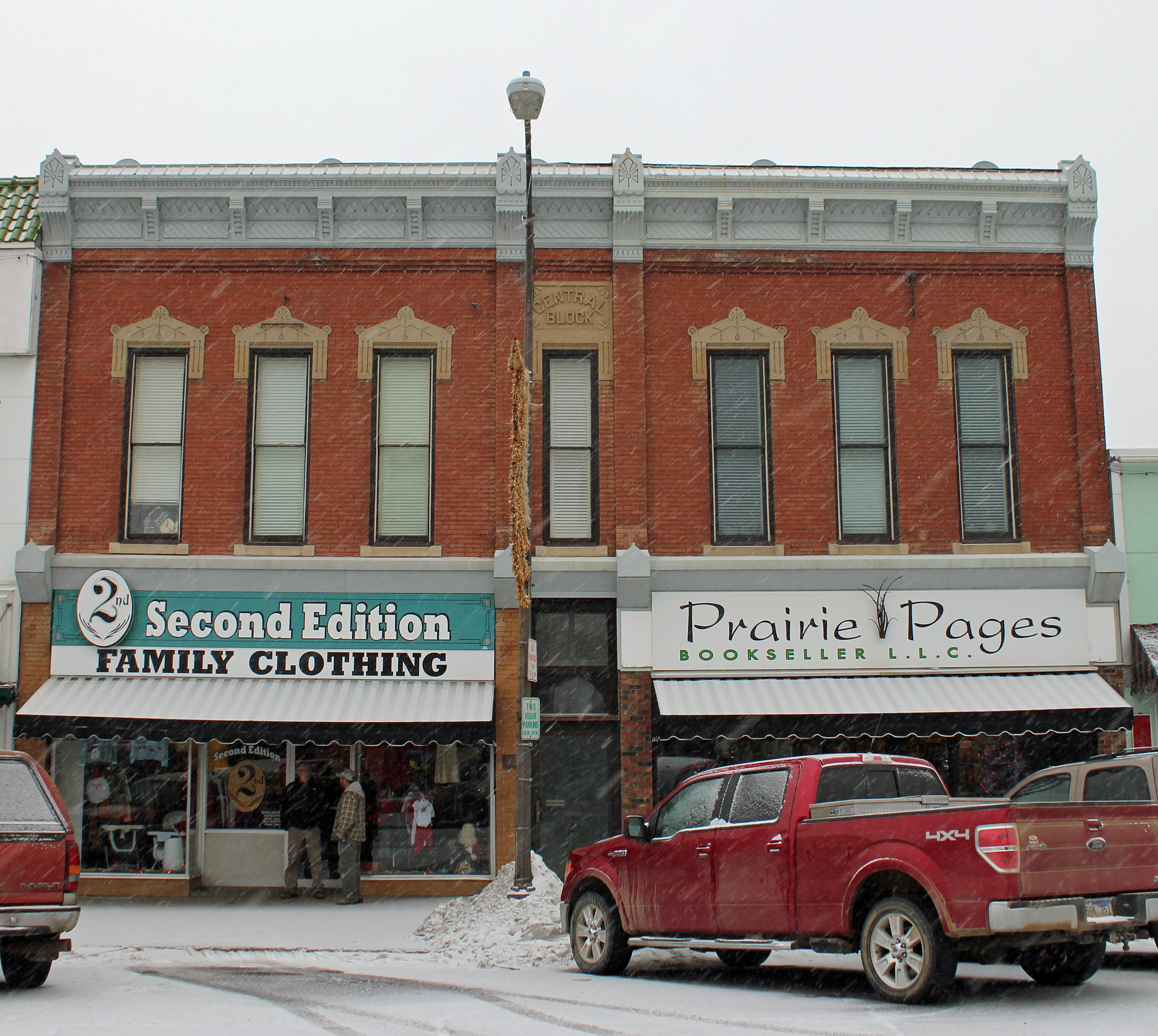

- Location within South Dakota Location within the United States
- Location: 321--325 S. Pierre St., Pierre, South Dakota
- Coordinates: 44°21′56″N 100°21′19″W
- Area: less than one acre
- Architect: Proudfoot & Bird
- Architectural style: Italianate
- NRHP reference No.: 88003201
- Added to NRHP: January 19, 1989

The Central Block is a historic commercial building located at 321–325 S. Pierre St. in Pierre, South Dakota. The Italianate masonry building was constructed in 1884 and was one of Pierre's earliest masonry commercial buildings. It was an early work of architects Proudfoot & Bird, then of Pierre but better known for their work elsewhere. The building opened by hosting the 1884 Republican Territorial Convention Ball, which featured a performance by the Rochester Orchestra. Since its opening, the building has housed numerous businesses and offices, including those of Alice Baird, Pierre's first female doctor, and Henry R. Horner, South Dakota State Senator and Pierre City Attorney. The building is now one of the only surviving buildings from Pierre's first commercial district.

The building was added to the National Register of Historic Places on January 19, 1989.

== See also ==
- Karcher Block, another historic commercial building in the district
