= Tad Perry =

American politician (born 1943)

Member of the South Dakota House of Representatives from the 24th district
- In office 2011–2012
- Preceded by: Ryan Olson
- Succeeded by: Mary Duvall

Personal details
- Born: March 11, 1943 (age 83) Iowa City, Iowa
- Party: Republican
- Spouse: Carolyn
- Children: four
- Profession: Educator

Robert Thomas Perry (born March 11, 1943) is an American former politician. He served as a Republican member for the 24th district in the South Dakota House of Representatives from 2011 to 2012.
