= Cooper Garnos =

American politician

Member of the South Dakota House of Representatives
- In office 1999–2006
- Preceded by: Patricia de Hueck
- Succeeded by: Kent Juhnke

Member of the South Dakota Senate from the 21st district
- In office 2007–2011
- Preceded by: Julie Bartling
- Succeeded by: Kent Juhnke

Personal details
- Born: October 19, 1965 (age 60) Mitchell, South Dakota, U.S.
- Party: Republican
- Spouse: Mary Jo
- Children: three
- Education: Dakota Wesleyan University (BA in social science) South Dakota State University (MA in education administration)
- Profession: teacher, rancher, businessman, etc.

Cooper Owen Garnos (born October 19, 1965) is an American former politician. He served in the South Dakota Senate from 2007 to 2011 and in the House from 1999 to 2006.
