= List of tributaries of the Missouri River =

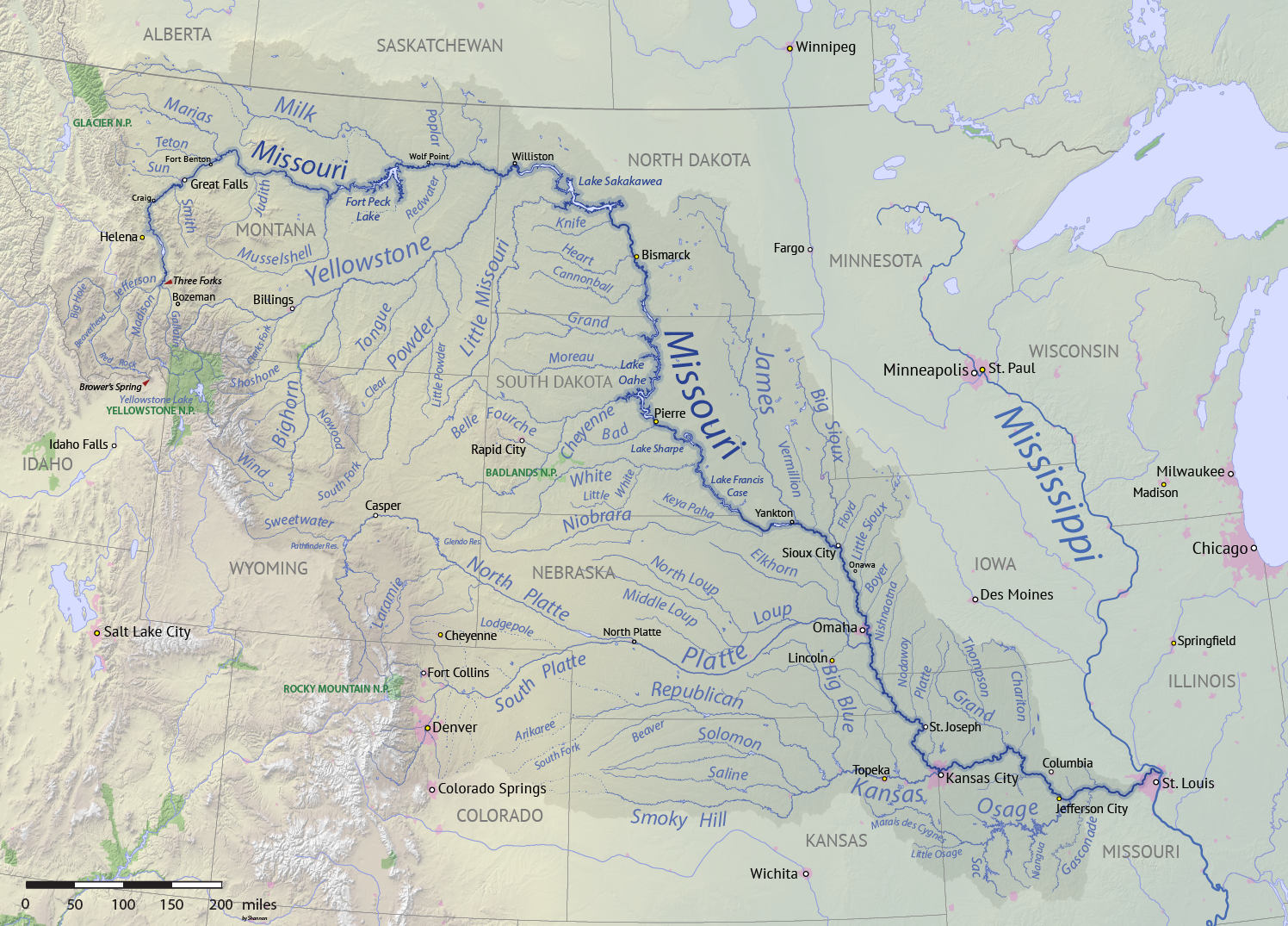
Map of the Missouri River watershed

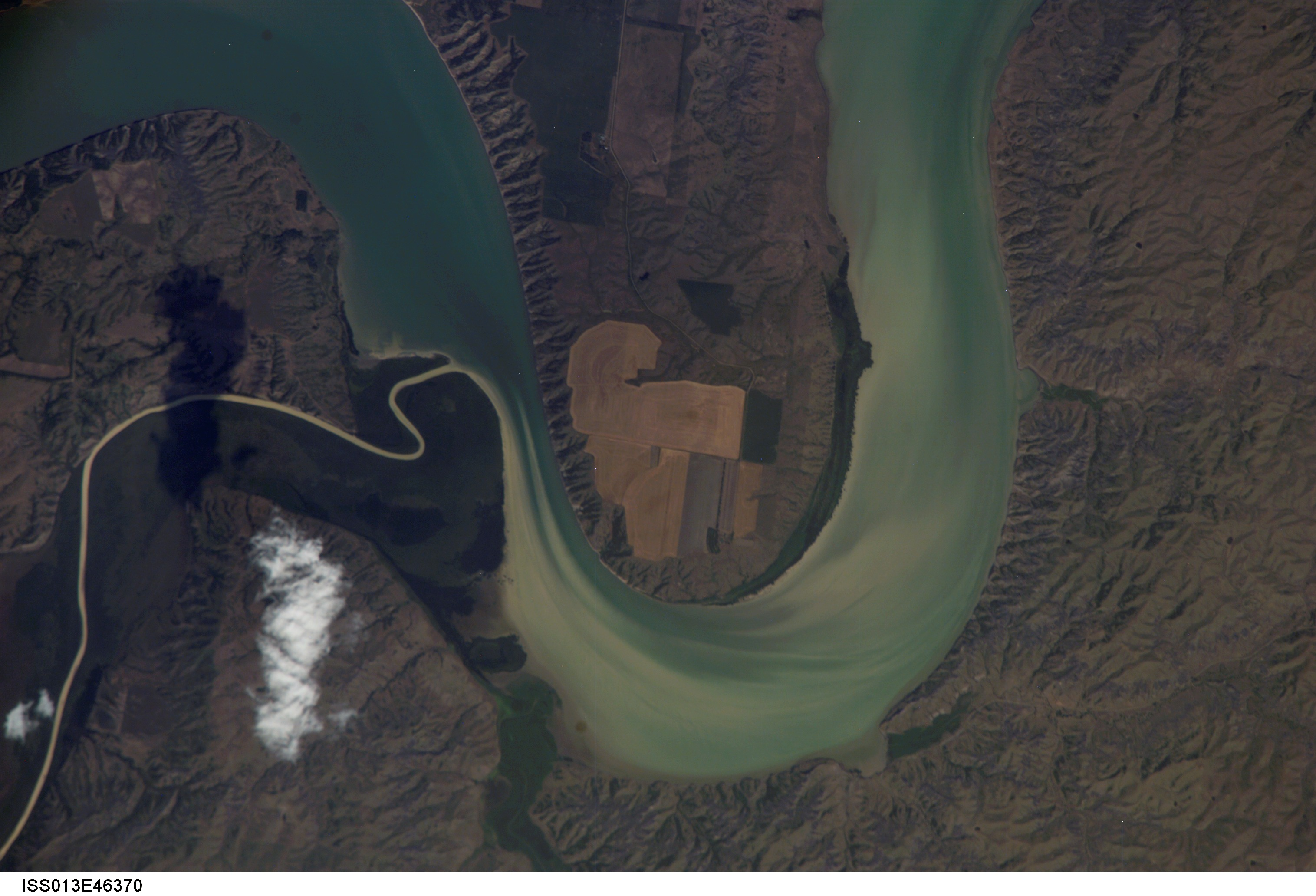
The White River flowing into the Missouri River and coloring it with clay

Tributaries of the Missouri River, a major river in the central United States, are listed here in upstream order. These lists are arranged into river sections between cities or mouths of major tributaries for ease of navigation. Two large tributaries (the Platte and Yellowstone) have their own separate lists because they would be too lengthy to include in part of another section.

Data is derived from U.S. Geological Survey (USGS) topographical maps and the USGS National Map.

== Table of primary tributaries ==
| Waterway | Orientation | Length (km) | Mouth coordinates | Mouth location | Source coordinates | Source location |
|---|---|---|---|---|---|---|
| Arrow Creek | Right | 115 mi (185 km) | 47°42′52″N 109°49′43″W | Chouteau County, Montana | 47°24′03″N 110°36′20″W | Judith Basin County, Montana |
| Auxvasse Creek | Left | 50 mi (80 km) | 38°40′55″N 91°49′23″W | Auxvasse Township, Callaway County, Missouri | 38°57′25″N 92°03′57″W | Kingdom City, Missouri |
| Bad River | Right | 160 mi (260 km) | 44°21′16″N 100°22′05″W | Fort Pierre, South Dakota | 44°02′06″N 101°39′58″W | Haakon County |
| Belt Creek | Right | 80 mi (129 km) | 47°35′53″N 111°02′55″W | Great Falls, Montana | 46°50′46″N 110°41′33″W | White Sulphur Springs, Montana |
| Blue River | Right | 40 mi (64 km) | 39°07′48″N 94°28′15″W | Kansas City, Missouri | 38°48′31″N 94°40′50″W | Overland Park, Kansas |
| Big Berger Creek | Right | 25 mi (40 km) | 38°37′14″N 91°13′43″W | New Haven, Missouri | 38°33′30″N 91°26′25″W | Boeuf Township, Gasconade County, Missouri |
| Big Dry Creek | Right | 103 mi (165 km) | 47°30′55″N 106°16′41″W | Circle, Montana | 47°16′20″N 107°08′32″W | Jordan, Montana |
| Big Muddy Creek | Left | 191 mi (307 km) | 48°08′30″N 104°36′43″W | Roosevelt County, Montana | 49°02′55″N 104°52′46″W | Rural Municipality of Happy Valley No. 10 |
| Big Sioux River | Left | 419 mi (674 km) | 42°29′27″N 96°26′47″W | Sioux City, Iowa | 45°19′18″N 97°02′33″W | Roberts County, South Dakota |
| Boyer River | Left | 139 mi (224 km) | 41°27′11″N 95°55′09″W | Pottawattamie County, Iowa | 42°35′56″N 95°16′34″W | Maple Valley Township, Buena Vista County, Iowa |
| Cannonball River | Right | 135 mi (217 km) | 46°25′45″N 100°35′54″W | Sioux County, North Dakota | 46°28′12″N 103°12′24″W | Slope County, North Dakota |
| Chariton River | Left | 218 mi (351 km) | 39°18′47″N 92°57′29″W | Keytesville, Missouri | 40°49′50″N 93°30′32″W | Humeston, Iowa |
| Cheyenne River | Right | 295 mi (475 km) | 44°46′15″N 100°43′04″W | Stanley County, South Dakota | 43°25′34″N 105°03′32″W | Converse County, Wyoming |
| Cow Creek | Left | 62 mi (100 km) | 47°47′18″N 108°56′06″W | Blaine County, Montana | 48°05′26″N 109°20′03″W | Blaine County, Montana |
| Crooked River | Left | 70 mi (113 km) | 39°13′00″N 93°50′33″W | Ray County, Missouri | 39°30′24″N 94°16′37″W | Clinton County, Missouri |
| Cuivre River | Right | 35 mi (56 km) | 38°56′00″N 90°41′11″W | St. Charles County, Missouri | 39°01′02″N 90°59′34″W | Bedford Township, Lincoln County, Missouri |
| Dearborn River | Left | 70 mi (113 km) | 47°07′41″N 111°54′37″W | Cascade, Montana | 47°18′33″N 112°49′10″W | Lewis and Clark County, Montana |
| Fishing River | Left | 39 mi (63 km) | 39°10′31″N 94°08′27″W | Orrick, Missouri | 39°18′53″N 94°29′45″W | Platte Township, Clay County, Missouri |
| Floyd River | Left | 110 mi (180 km) | 42°28′59″N 96°23′30″W | Sioux City, Iowa | 43°14′02″N 95°37′12″W | Sanborn, Iowa |
| Gallatin River | Left | 120 mi (193 km) | 45°56′20″N 111°29′35″W | Gallatin County, Montana | 44°51′27″N 110°52′59″W | Park County, Montana |
| Gasconade River | Right | 280 mi (450 km) | 38°40′28″N 91°32′55″W | Gasconade, Missouri | 37°11′55″N 92°43′06″W | Seymour, Missouri |
| Grand River | Left | 470 mi (760 km) | 39°23′02″N 93°06′29″W | Brunswick, Missouri | 41°01′29″N 94°16′04″W | Union County, Iowa |
| Grand River | Right | 188 mi (303 km) | 45°34′32″N 100°28′02″W | Mobridge, South Dakota | 45°45′13″N 102°12′16″W | Perkins County, South Dakota |
| Heart River | Right | 295 mi (475 km) | 46°46′03″N 100°50′31″W | Bismarck, North Dakota | 46°56′25″N 103°18′56″W | Belfield, North Dakota |
| James River | Right | 710 mi (1,143 km) | 42°52′17″N 97°17′26″W | Yankton, South Dakota | 46°56′25″N 103°18′56″W | Belfield, North Dakota |
| Jefferson River | Left | 83 mi (134 km) | 45°55′39″N 111°30′29″W | Three Forks, Montana | 45°33′42″N 112°20′15″W | Twin Bridges, Montana |
| Judith River | Right | 140 mi (220 km) | 47°44′06″N 109°38′46″W | Fergus County, Montana | 46°50′56″N 110°16′10″W | Judith Basin County, Montana |
| Kansas River | Right | 148 mi (238 km) | 39°06′55″N 94°36′38″W | Kansas City, Kansas | 39°03′36″N 96°48′05″W | Junction City, Kansas |
| Knife River | Right | 120 mi (193 km) | 47°19′17″N 101°22′08″W | Mercer County, North Dakota | 47°11′02″N 103°12′40″W | North Billings, North Dakota |
| Lamine River | Right | 62 mi (100 km) | 38°58′47″N 92°51′05″W | Boonville, Missouri | 38°40′05″N 92°57′17″W | Richland Township, Dickinson County, Iowa |
| Little Blue River | Right | 45 mi (73 km) | 39°12′28″N 94°13′07″W | Sibley, Missouri | 38°50′08″N 94°32′06″W | Belton, Missouri |
| Little Missouri River | Right | 560 mi (901 km) | 47°34′41″N 102°43′23″W | Dunn County, North Dakota | 44°32′25″N 104°59′57″W | Crook County, Wyoming |
| Little Muddy River | Left | 96 mi (154 km) | 48°08′07″N 103°35′31″W | Williams County, North Dakota | 48°32′00″N 103°10′12″W | Williams County |
| Little Sioux River | Left | 258 mi (415 km) | 41°48′11″N 96°03′58″W | Little Sioux Township, Harrison County, Iowa | 43°39′35″N 95°18′19″W | Rost Township, Jackson County, Minnesota |
| Loutre River | Left | 57 mi (92 km) | 38°42′43″N 91°25′03″W | Hermann, Missouri | 39°05′08″N 91°47′57″W | Loutre Township, Montgomery County, Missouri |
| Madison River | Right | 183 mi (295 km) | 45°55′39″N 111°30′29″W | Three Forks, Montana | 44°38′32″N 110°51′56″W | Park County, Wyoming |
| Marias River | Right | 210 mi (338 km) | 47°55′48″N 110°29′26″W | Chouteau County, Montana | 48°29′12″N 112°13′41″W | Glacier County, Montana |
| Milk River | Left | 729 mi (1,173 km) | 48°03′22″N 106°19′08″W | Valley County, Montana | 48°51′20″N 113°01′10″W | Glacier County, Montana |
| Moreau River | Right | 200 mi (320 km) | 45°21′19″N 100°22′31″W | Dewey County, South Dakota | 45°08′40″N 102°50′21″W | Perkins County, South Dakota |
| Mosquito Creek | Left | 60 mi (97 km) | 41°10′34″N 95°50′25″W | Council Bluffs, Iowa | 41°47′55″N 95°22′51″W | Union Township, Davis County, Iowa |
| Musselshell River | Right | 290 mi (470 km) | 47°22′29″N 107°56′35″W | Winnett, Montana | 46°28′47″N 110°16′21″W | Wheatland County, Montana |
| Niobrara River | Right | 569 mi (915 km) | 42°46′18″N 98°02′46″W | Niobrara, Nebraska | 42°49′15″N 104°38′50″W | Niobrara County, Wyoming |
| Nishnabotna River | Left | 16 mi (26 km) | 40°28′57″N 95°41′43″W | Watson, Missouri | 40°39′09″N 95°37′25″W | Hamburg, Iowa |
| Nodaway River | Left | 66 mi (106 km) | 39°54′07″N 94°57′58″W | Andrew County, Missouri | 40°38′06″N 95°01′09″W | Shambaugh, Iowa |
| Osage River | Right | 276 mi (444 km) | 38°35′49″N 91°56′43″W | Callaway County, Missouri | 38°01′39″N 94°14′39″W | Schell City, Missouri |
| Peace Creek | Right | 50 mi (80 km) | 38°10′28″N 98°13′46″W | Rice County, Kansas | 37°57′59″N 98°38′48″W | Stafford County, Kansas |
| Platte River | Right | 310 mi (499 km) | 41°03′08″N 95°52′51″W | Plattsmouth, Nebraska | 41°06′50″N 100°40′33″W | North Platte, Nebraska |
| Platte River | Left | 171 mi (275 km) | 39°15′51″N 94°50′15″W | Farley, Missouri | 41°09′23″N 94°23′02″W | Union County, Iowa |
| Poplar River | Left | 167 mi (269 km) | 48°05′03″N 105°11′08″W | Poplar, Montana | 49°15′13″N 106°23′32″W | Rural Municipality of Old Post No. 43 |
| Redwater River | Right | 110 mi (177 km) | 48°03′41″N 105°12′38″W | Poplar, Montana | 47°03′37″N 105°52′53″W | Prairie County, Montana |
| Sixteen Mile Creek | Left | 69 mi (111 km) | 46°06′20″N 111°23′52″W | Broadwater County, Montana | 46°15′29″N 110°32′42″W | Meagher County, Montana |
| Smith River | Right | 120 mi (200 km) | 47°24′49″N 111°28′43″W | Cascade County, Montana | 46°31′43″N 110°58′40″W | Meagher County, Montana |
| Soldier River | Left | 67 mi (108 km) | 41°44′15″N 96°05′52″W | Mondamin, Iowa | 42°16′11″N 95°19′47″W | Hayes Township, Crawford County, Iowa |
| Sun River | Left | 130 mi (209 km) | 47°29′42″N 111°18′43″W | Great Falls, Montana | 47°37′47″N 112°51′25″W | Lewis and Clark County, Montana |
| Tarkio River | Left | 81 mi (130 km) | 40°09′46″N 95°26′19″W | Holt County, Missouri | 41°11′38″N 95°03′45″W | Cass County, Iowa |
| rivière Vermillion | Left | 96 mi (154 km) | 42°43′59″N 96°53′26″W | Vermillion, South Dakota | 43°23′36″N 97°04′06″W | Turner County |
| White River | Right | 580 mi (933 km) | 43°42′00″N 99°26′08″W | Chamberlain, South Dakota | 42°41′10″N 103°50′14″W | Harrison, Nebraska |
| Wolf River | Right | 45 mi (73 km) | 39°53′55″N 95°11′30″W | Doniphan County, Kansas | 39°47′38″N 95°38′28″W | Powhattan, Kansas |
| Yellowstone River | Right | 692 mi (1,114 km) | 47°58′42″N 103°58′56″W | Williams County, North Dakota | 43°59′18″N 109°55′45″W | Park County, Wyoming |

== Mouth to Kansas City ==
- Gasconade River
  - Big Piney River
    - Spring Creek
  - Roubidoux Creek
  - Osage Fork Gasconade River
  - Beaver Creek
- Auxvasse Creek
- Osage River
  - Maries River
  - Niangua River
    - Little Niangua River
    - Greasy Creek
  - Pomme de Terre River
    - Little Pomme de Terre River
  - South Grand River
    - Tebo Creek
    - Big Creek
  - Weaubleau Creek
  - Sac River
    - Little Sac River
    - Turnback Creek
  - Clear Creek
  - Little Osage River
    - Marmaton River
  - Marais des Cygnes River
    - Bull Creek
    - Pottawatomie Creek
- Moreau River
  - North Moreau Creek
  - South Moreau Creek
- Cedar Creek
- Moniteau Creek
- Perche Creek
- Lamine River
  - Blackwater River
    - Salt Fork Blackwater River
  - Heaths Creek
  - Muddy Creek
  - Richland Creek
  - Flat Creek
    - Haw Creek
- Little Chariton River
  - Middle Fork Little Chariton River
  - East Fork Little Chariton River
- Chariton River
  - Mussel Fork Chariton River
  - Walnut Creek
  - Blackbird Creek
- Grand River
  - Locust Creek
  - Medicine Creek
  - Thompson River
    - Honey Creek
    - Weldon River
  - Shoal Creek
  - Big Creek
  - Grindstone Creek
  - East Fork Grand River
  - Middle Fork Grand River
- Fishing River
  - East Fork Fishing River
- Little Blue River
- Blue River
  - Indian Creek
  - Coffee Creek
  - Wolf Creek

== Kansas City to Plattsmouth ==
- Kansas River
  - Wakarusa River
  - Delaware River
  - Soldier Creek
  - Big Blue River
    - Fancy Creek
    - Little Blue River
      - Mill Creek
    - Turkey Creek
    - West Fork Big Blue River
  - Republican River
    - White Rock Creek
    - Prairie Dog Creek
    - Sappa Creek
      - Beaver Creek
    - Medicine Creek
    - Red Willow Creek
    - Frenchman River
      - Stinking Water Creek
    - South Fork Republican River
    - North Fork Republican River
    - Arikaree River
  - Smoky Hill River
    - Solomon River
      - North Fork Solomon River
        - Cedar Creek
        - Beaver Creek
        - Bow Creek
      - South Fork Solomon River
        - Covert Creek
        - Medicine Creek
    - Saline River
      - Mulberry Creek
      - Spillman Creek
      - Wolf Creek
    - Big Timber Creek
    - North Fork Smoky Hill River
- Platte River
  - Little Platte River
  - Third Fork Platte River
  - Castile Creek
  - One Hundred and Two River
- Nodaway River
  - East Nodaway River
  - West Nodaway River
    - Middle Nodaway River
- Wolf River
- Big Nemaha River
  - Muddy Creek
  - North Fork Big Nemaha River
  - South Fork Big Nemaha River
- Tarkio River
- Little Nemaha River
  - South Fork Little Nemaha River
- Nishnabotna River
  - West Nishnabotna River
    - Walnut Creek
  - East Nishnabotna River
- Weeping Water Creek
- Keg Creek
- James Creek

== Platte River Basin ==
- Platte River
  - Salt Creek
    - Oak Creek
    - Stevens Creek
    - Middle Creek
    - Antelope Creek
    - Elk Creek
    - Beal Slough
    - Haines Branch
    - Cardwell Branch
    - Lynn Creek
    - Deadman's Run
    - Little Salt Creek
  - Elkhorn River
    - Maple Creek
    - Logan Creek
    - North Fork Elkhorn River
    - Cache Creek
    - South Fork Elkhorn River
  - Shell Creek
  - Loup River
    - Cedar River
    - North Loup River
      - Calamus River
      - Goose Creek
    - Middle Loup River
      - South Loup River
        - Mud Creek
      - Dismal River
      - South Branch Middle Loup River
      - Middle Branch Middle Loup River
      - North Branch Middle Loup River
  - Prairie Creek
  - Wood River
  - Buffalo Creek
  - North Platte River
    - Birdwood Creek
    - Blue Creek
    - Rush Creek
    - Horse Creek
    - Cherry Creek
      - Box Elder Creek
    - Rawhide Creek
    - Laramie River
      - North Laramie River
      - Chugwater Creek
        - Richeau Creek
      - Sybille Creek
      - Fourmile Creek
      - Little Laramie River
      - Sand Creek
    - Horseshoe Creek
    - La Bonte Creek
    - La Prele Creek
    - Casper Creek
    - Bates Creek
    - Sweetwater River
      - Sage Hen Creek
      - Long Creek
      - Willow Creek
      - Little Sweetwater River
      - East Sweetwater River
    - Sage Creek
    - Medicine Bow River
      - Little Medicine Bow River
      - Rock Creek
      - Wagonhound Creek
    - Pass Creek
    - Encampment River
      - North Fork Encampment River
    - Douglas Creek
    - Pinkham Creek
    - Canadian River
    - Michigan River
      - Illinois River
      - Owl Creek
      - South Fork Michigan River
    - North Fork North Platte River
    - Roaring Fork North Platte River
    - Grizzly Creek
      - Buffalo Creek
    - Little Grizzly Creek
  - South Platte River
    - Lodgepole Creek
      - Muddy Creek
    - Cottonwood Creek
    - Beaver Creek
    - Bijou Creek
      - East Bijou Creek
      - West Bijou Creek
    - Kiowa Creek
    - Box Elder Creek
    - Cache La Poudre River
      - South Fork Cache La Poudre River
    - Big Thompson River
      - Little Thompson River
      - Dry Creek
      - North Fork Big Thompson River
    - St. Vrain River
      - Boulder Creek
      - Left Hand Creek
    - Clear Creek
      - North Clear Creek
    - Cherry Creek
    - Bear Creek
    - Deer Creek
    - Plum Creek
    - North Fork South Platte River
      - Craig Creek
    - Horse Creek
    - Tarryall Creek
    - Middle Fork South Platte River
    - South Fork South Platte River

== Plattsmouth to Pierre ==
- Mosquito Creek
- Boyer River
  - Willow River
  - East Boyer River
- Soldier River
  - East Soldier River
    - Middle Soldier River
- Little Sioux River
  - Maple River
    - Elk Creek
  - West Fork Little Sioux River
  - Mill Creek
  - Ocheyedan River
    - Little Ocheyedan River
- Floyd River
  - West Branch Floyd River
    - Little Floyd River
- Perry Creek
- Big Sioux River
  - Rock River
    - Little Rock River
    - East Branch Rock River
  - Beaver Creek
  - Slip-up Creek
  - Split Rock Creek
  - Silver Creek
  - Flandreau Creek
  - Medary Creek
  - Bullhead Run
  - Indian River

Vermillion River

- James River
  - Wolf Creek
  - Pierre Creek
  - Rock Creek
  - Shue Creek
  - Timber Creek
  - Snake Creek
  - Mud Creek
  - Moccasin Creek
    - Foot Creek
  - Elm River
  - Pipestem River
  - Kelly Creek
- Snatch Creek
- Bazile Creek
- Niobrara River
  - Verdigre Creek
  - Redbird Creek
  - Eagle Creek
  - Keya Paha River
    - Shadley Creek
    - Crazy Hole Creek
    - Holt Creek
  - Plum Creek
  - Minnechaduza Creek
  - Snake River
    - Steer Creek
  - Bear Creek
  - Leander Creek
  - Rush Creek
  - Pine Creek
  - Butte Creek
- Ponca Creek
- Choteau Creek
- Randall Creek
- Garden Creek
- Platte Creek
  - Castalia Creek
  - Edgerton Creek
- White River
  - White Thunder Creek
  - Little White River
    - Pine Creek
    - Cut Meat Creek
    - Scabby Creek
  - Black Pipe Creek
  - Porcupine Creek
  - Potato Creek
  - Medicine Root Creek
    - No Flesh Creek
  - Wounded Knee Creek
  - Slim Butte Creek
- American Creek
- Crow Creek
- Knoll Creek
- Chaney Rush Creek
- Chapelle Creek
- Bad River
  - War Creek
  - White Clay Creek
  - Dry Creek
  - Big Prairie Dog Creek
  - Mitchell Creek
  - North Fork Bad River
    - Dirty Womans Creek
    - Mexican Creek
  - South Fork Bad River

== Pierre to Bismarck ==
- Okobojo Creek
- Mail Shack Creek
- Cheyenne River
  - Fishgut Creek
  - Rudy Creek
  - Straighthead Creek
  - Spotted Bear Creek
  - Cherry Creek
  - Belle Fourche River
    - Alkali Creek
    - Bear Butte Creek
      - Cottle Creek
      - Vanocker Creek
    - Whitewood Creek
      - Whitetail Creek
        - Fantail Creek
    - Redwater River
      - Spearfish Creek
    - Blacktail Creek
    - Kara Creek
  - Elk Creek
  - Boxelder Creek
    - Bogus Jim Creek
  - Rapid Creek
    - Victoria Creek
    - Castle Creek
      - Heely Creek
    - North Fork Rapid Creek
      - Buskala Creek
  - Spring Creek
  - Battle Creek
  - French Creek
    - Sidney Creek
    - Glen Erin Creek
    - Laughing Water Creek
  - Beaver Creek
    - Well Pole Creek
  - Lame Johnny Creek
    - Flynn Creek
  - Fall River
    - Hot Brook
  - Horsehead Creek
  - Cascade Creek
  - Hat Creek
    - Plains Creek
  - Red Canyon Creek
    - Hawkwright Creek
      - Pleasant Valley Creek
  - Moss Agate Creek
  - Lance Creek
  - Black Thunder Creek
    - Little Thunder Creek
  - Antelope Creek
  - Dry Fork Cheyenne River
- Stove Creek
- Moreau River
  - Virgin Creek
  - Little Moreau River
  - Red Earth Creek
  - Bear Creek
  - Irish Creek
  - Thunder Butte Creek
    - Beaver Trap Creek
  - Flint Rock Creek
  - Deep Creek
  - Rabbit Creek
    - Peggy Creek
  - Beverly Creek
  - North Fork Moreau River
  - South Fork Moreau River
    - Battle Creek
- Grand River
  - High Bank Creek
  - Firesteel Creek
  - Black Horse Butte Creek
  - Thunder Hawk Creek
  - Willow Creek
  - North Fork Grand River
    - Buffalo Creek
    - Lightning Creek
    - Crooked Creek
      - Trunk Creek
      - Staadt Creek
    - Spring Creek
  - South Fork Grand River
    - Flat Creek
    - Lodgepole Creek
    - Box Spring Creek
    - Big Nasty Creek
    - Skull Creek
    - Sioux Creek
      - Atterbury Creek
- Tall Prairie Chicken Creek
- Oak Creek
- Fourmile Creek
- Porcupine Creek
- Beaver Creek
- Cannonball River
  - Cantapeta Creek
  - Dogtooth Creek
  - Cedar Creek
    - Hay Creek
    - Brushy Creek
    - Duck Creek
  - Snake Creek
  - Morris Creek
  - Sheep Creek
  - Thirtymile Creek
- Apple Creek
- Heart River
  - Sweetbriar Creek
  - Big Muddy Creek
    - Haymarsh Creek
  - Antelope Creek
  - Heart Butte Creek
  - Green River
  - Ash Creek
  - South Branch Heart River

== Bismarck to Williston ==
- Burnt Creek
- Painted Woods Creek
- Turtle Creek
- Knife River
  - Spring Creek
  - Elm Creek
  - Deep Creek
  - Crooked Creek
  - Little Knife River
- Garrison Creek
- Douglas Creek (submerged under Lake Sakakawea)
  - East Branch Douglas Creek
  - Middle Branch Douglas Creek
  - West Branch Douglas Creek
- Little Missouri River
  - Cherry Creek
    - Rough Creek
  - Crosby Creek
  - Beicegel Creek
  - Beaver Creek
    - Elk Creek
  - Knutson Creek
  - Davis Creek
  - Sand Creek
  - Deep Creek
    - West Fork Deep Creek
    - East Fork Deep Creek
  - Cannonball Creek
  - Beaver Creek
  - Boxelder Creek
    - Cabin Creek
  - Dry House Creek
  - Willow Creek
  - North Fork Little Missouri River
  - Prairie Creek
- Shell Creek
  - East Fork Shell Creek
  - West Shell Creek
- Bear Den Creek
- Little Knife River
- White Earth River
  - Paulsen Creek
- Little Muddy River

== Yellowstone River Basin ==
- Yellowstone River
  - Charbonneau Creek
  - Horse Creek
  - Fox Creek
  - Burns Creek
  - Box Elder Creek
  - Clear Creek
  - Cedar Creek
  - O'Fallon Creek
    - Sandstone Creek
  - Powder River
    - Mispah Creek
    - Little Powder River
    - Clear Creek
      - Buffalo Creek
      - Piney Creek
        - Little Piney Creek
      - Rock Creek
        - French Creek
    - Wild Horse Creek
    - Crazy Woman Creek
      - South Fork Crazy Woman Creek
      - Middle Fork Crazy Woman Creek
      - North Fork Crazy Woman Creek
    - Dry Fork Powder River
    - Salt Creek
    - South Fork Powder River
    - North Fork Powder River
    - Middle Fork Powder River
      - Red Fork Powder River
      - Buffalo Creek
  - Tongue River
    - Pumpkin Creek
    - Ash Creek
    - Foster Creek
    - Lay Creek
    - Liscom Creek
    - Beaver Creek
    - Otter Creek
    - Hanging Woman Creek
    - Prairie Dog Creek
    - Goose Creek
      - Soldier Creek
      - Big Goose Creek
      - Little Goose Creek
    - Wolf Creek
  - Rosebud Creek
    - Little Rosebud Creek
    - West Rosebud Creek
    - Lame Deer Creek
    - Muddy Creek
    - Davis Creek
  - Armells Creek
    - East Fork Armells Creek
    - West Fork Armells Creek
  - Sarpy Creek
  - Bighorn River
    - Tullock Creek
    - Little Bighorn River
    - Beauvais Creek
    - Rotten Grass Creek
    - Soap Creek
    - Porcupine Creek
    - Crooked Creek
    - Shoshone River
      - Sage Creek
      - Spring Creek
      - North Fork Shoshone River
        - Elk Fork Shoshone River
      - South Fork Shoshone River
    - Dry Creek
    - Shell Creek
      - Beaver Creek
    - Greybull River
      - Meeteetse Creek
      - Wood River
        - South Fork Wood River
      - Francs Fork Greybull River
    - Nowood River
      - Paint Rock Creek
      - Tensleep Creek
      - Otter Creek
      - Deep Creek
    - Fifteenmile Creek
      - Middle Fork Fifteenmile Creek
        - South Fork Fifteenmile Creek
    - Nowater Creek
    - Gooseberry Creek
    - Cottonwood Creek
      - Grass Creek
      - Prospect Creek
    - Kirby Creek
    - Owl Creek
    - Wind River
      - Muddy Creek
      - Badwater Creek
      - Poison Creek
      - Fivemile Creek
      - Muskrat Creek
      - Little Wind River
        - Beaver Creek
        - Popo Agie River
          - North Popo Agie River
          - Middle Popo Agie River
          - Little Popo Agie River
        - Sage Creek
        - South Fork Little Wind River
        - North Fork Little Wind River
      - Dry Creek
      - Bull Lake Creek
      - Crow Creek
      - Dinwoody Creek
      - East Fork Wind River
        - Wiggins Fork Wind River
      - Horse Creek
      - Du Noir Creek
  - Fly Creek
  - Arrow Creek
  - Pryor Creek
    - Hay Creek
  - Blue Creek
  - Clarks Fork Yellowstone River
    - Rock Creek
      - Red Lodge Creek
    - Bear Creek
    - Bennett Creek
    - O'Hara Creek
    - Sunlight Creek
    - Crandall Creek
  - Stillwater River
    - Rosebud Creek
      - West Rosebud Creek
      - East Rosebud Creek
    - Limestone Creek
  - Sweet Grass Creek
  - Otter Creek
  - Boulder River
    - West Boulder River
    - East Boulder River
    - East Fork Boulder River
  - Big Timber Creek
    - Swamp Creek
  - Duck Creek
  - Shields River
    - Rock Creek
    - Cottonwood Creek
    - Flathead Creek
  - Gardiner River
    - Lava Creek
    - Winter Creek
    - Obsidian Creek
  - Hellroaring Creek
  - Lamar River
    - Slough Creek
    - Soda Butte Creek
    - Cache Creek
    - Miller Creek
  - Tower Creek
  - Raven Creek
  - Thorofare Creek
  - North Fork Yellowstone River
  - South Fork Yellowstone River

== North Dakota–Montana Border to Great Falls ==
- Little Muddy Creek
- Big Muddy Creek
  - Smoke Creek
  - Lake Creek
- Poplar River
  - Boxelder Creek
  - West Fork Poplar River
    - Police Creek
    - Hell Creek
    - Butte Creek
    - Middle Fork Poplar River
      - Lost Child Creek
      - Coal Creek
    - East Fork Poplar River
- Wolf Creek
- Little Porcupine Creek
- Milk River
  - Porcupine Creek
    - Middle Fork Porcupine Creek
  - Willow Creek
  - Rock Creek
    - Willow Creek
    - Snake Creek
  - Beaver Creek
  - Frenchman Creek
  - Whitewater Creek
  - Little Cottonwood Creek
  - Cottonwood Creek
    - Black Coulee
    - Woody Island Coulee
  - Battle Creek
    - East Fork Battle Creek
  - Lodge Creek
  - Clear Creek
  - Boxelder Creek
  - Big Sandy Creek
    - Sage Creek
  - Verdigris Coulee
  - North Fork Milk River
    - Lonely Valley Creek
  - Middle Fork Milk River
  - South Fork Milk River
- Big Dry Creek
  - Woody Creek
  - Little Dry Creek
- Musselshell River
  - Flatwillow Creek
    - Box Elder Creek
      - McDonald Creek
    - Elk Creek
  - American Fork Musselshell River
  - South Fork Musselshell River
  - North Fork Musselshell River
- Armells Creek
- Cow Creek
- Birch Creek
- Judith River
  - Wolf Creek
    - Dry Wolf Creek
  - Warm Springs Creek
  - Sage Creek
  - Big Spring Creek
  - Louse Creek
  - Ross Fork Creek
  - Middle Fork Judith River
    - Lost Fork Judith River
  - South Fork Judith River
- Arrow Creek
  - Cowboy Creek
  - Surprise Creek
- Marias River
  - Teton River
    - Deep Creek
      - Willow Creek
  - Pondera Coulee
  - Willow Creek
  - Dry Fork Marias River
  - Cut Bank Creek
    - Greasewood Creek
  - Two Medicine River
    - Birch Creek
      - Dupuyer Creek
    - Badger Creek
- Highwood Creek
- Belt Creek

== Great Falls to Three Forks ==
- Sun River
  - Muddy Creek
  - Elk Creek
  - North Fork Sun River
  - South Fork Sun River
    - West Fork Sun River
- Smith River
  - Hound Creek
  - Tenderfoot Creek
  - Whitetail Deer Creek
- Dearborn River
  - South Fork Dearborn River
  - Middle Fork Dearborn River
  - Cuniff Creek
- Little Prickly Pear Creek
- Prickly Pear Creek
  - Tenmile Creek
- Deep Creek
- Crow Creek
- Sixteen Mile Creek
  - South Fork Sixteen Mile Creek
  - Middle Fork Sixteen Mile Creek

== Headwaters ==
- Gallatin River
  - East Gallatin River
    - Dry Creek
    - Bridger Creek
  - Hyalite Creek
  - Spanish Creek
  - Storm Castle Creek
  - West Fork Gallatin River
  - Taylor Creek
- Madison River
  - Cedar Creek
  - Ruby Creek
  - West Fork Madison River
    - Lake Creek
    - Elk River
  - Duck Creek
  - South Fork Madison River
  - Firehole River
    - Little Firehole River
  - Gibbon River
- Jefferson River
  - South Boulder River
  - Boulder River
    - Little Boulder River
  - Whitetail Deer Creek
  - Big Pipestone Creek
  - Fish Creek
  - Big Hole River
    - Divide Creek
    - Wise River
      - Pettengill Creek
    - North Fork Big Hole River
    - Big Lake Creek
    - Governor Creek
  - Beaverhead River
    - Ruby River
      - Granite Creek
      - Sweetwater Creek
    - Blacktail Deer Creek
    - Rattlesnake Creek
    - Grasshopper Creek
    - Horse Prairie Creek
      - Trail Creek
    - Red Rock River
      - Sage Creek
      - Junction Creek
      - Long Creek
      - Odell Creek
      - Red Rock Creek
        - Hell Roaring Creek
          - Brower's Spring

== See also ==
- List of tributaries of the Mississippi River
