= Jim Creek =

Jim Creek may refer to:

- Jim Creek (Mill Creek), a stream in Missouri
- Jim Creek (Boxelder Creek), a stream in South Dakota
- Jim Creek (James River), a stream in South Dakota
- Jim Creek near Oso in Washington, and the so-named VLF transmitter Jim Creek Naval Radio Station
