= Grizzly Bear Creek =

Grizzly Bear Creek may refer to:

- Grizzly Bear Creek (Alberta)
- Grizzly Bear Creek (South Dakota)
