= French Creek (Cheyenne River tributary) =

- Location of French Creek

Location
- States: South Dakota

Physical characteristics
- Source: confluence of North Fork French Creek and South Fork French Creek
  - location: Black Hills
  - coordinates: 43.780951°N 103.720116°W
- Mouth: Cheyenne River
  - location: Red Shirt, South Dakota
  - coordinates: 43.645777°N 102.922106°W
- Length: 62 mi (100 km)

Basin features
- Tributaries
  - left: Laughing Water Creek
  - right: Glen Erin Creek

French Creek is an intermittent stream located in the Black Hills region of western South Dakota, United States. It is a tributary of the Cheyenne River. French Creek flows year-round, but in drier periods it flows into an underground drainage near the eastern boundary of Custer State Park and never reaches the Cheyenne.

French Creek rises approximately 5 miles (8.0 km) northwest of Custer, South Dakota and extends for a length of 62 miles (100 km). The river flows in a generally eastward direction through Custer State Park and empties into the Cheyenne River near Red Shirt west of Badlands National Park. Custer State Park has a trail in French Creek Natural Area and a horse camp, both along the river. Near the river's eastern terminus on the prairie, French Creek Camping Area is part of a National Forest.

French Creek most likely was named for the ancestry of early trappers. Gold was discovered in French Creek during an expedition led by George Armstrong Custer in 1874. This discovery triggered the Black Hills gold rush of the late 1870s.

== See also ==
- List of rivers of South Dakota
