= Stinking Water Creek =

Stinking Water Creek or Stinkingwater Creek may refer to:

- Stinking Water Creek (Little White River), a stream in South Dakota
- Stinkingwater Creek (Belle Fourche River), a stream in South Dakota
- Stinking Water Creek, a variant name of the Ruby River
