= Frozen Man Creek =

Frozen Man Creek may refer to:

- Frozen Man Creek (Plum Creek), a creek in South Dakota
- Frozen Man Creek (Sulphur Creek), a creek in South Dakota
