= Moccasin Creek =

Moccasin Creek may refer to:

- Moccasin Creek (Uwharrie River tributary), a stream in Montgomery County, North Carolina
- Moccasin Creek (South Dakota), a creek in South Dakota
- Moccasin Creek (Wisconsin), a creek in Wisconsin
- Moccasin Creek State Park, a state park in Georgia
