= Holt Creek =

Holt Creek may refer to:

- Holt Creek (Keya Paha River tributary), a stream in Nebraska and South Dakota
- Holt Creek (Wisconsin), a stream in Wisconsin
