= South Scalp Creek =

Coordinates: 43°05′19″N 98°46′04″W

South Scalp Creek is a stream system in the U.S. state of South Dakota.

Scalp Creek received its name from an incident when a man was scalped by Sioux Indians.

== See also ==
- List of rivers of South Dakota
- North Scalp Creek
- Scalp Creek
