= Flynn Creek =

- Flynn Creek mouth location in South Dakota
- Etymology: Named for Ed Flynn, local settler

Physical characteristics
- Source: Flynn Creek Spring
  - coordinates: 43.6894281°N 103.5546387°W
  - elevation: 5,581 ft (1,701 m)
- Mouth: Lame Johnny Creek, South fork
  - coordinates: 43.6549859°N 103.4104720°W
  - elevation: 4,101 ft (1,250 m)
- Discharge
  - location: 43°39′10″N 103°25′10″W (near mouth)
  - average: 11.8 cu ft/s (0.33 m^{3}/s)

Basin features
- Progression: Lame Johnny Creek→ Cheyenne River→ Missouri River→ Mississippi River→ Gulf of Mexico
- River system: Cheyenne River system

Flynn Creek is a stream in Custer County, South Dakota. Its source is the Flynn Creek spring near the unincorporated community of Sanator, and its mouth is at the south fork of the Lame Johnny Creek, which later flows into the Cheyenne River about 20 miles (32 km) away.

Flynn Creek is named for Ed Flynn, a pioneer settler.

== See also ==
- List of rivers of South Dakota
