= Jack Dailey Creek =

Stream in the South Dakota, US

Coordinates: 44°03′43″N 101°11′01″W

Jack Dailey Creek is a stream in the U.S. state of South Dakota.

Jack Dailey Creek has the name of Jack Dailey, a pioneer settler.

== See also ==
- List of rivers of South Dakota
