= Galena Creek =

Stream in South Dakota, U.S.

Coordinates: 43°45′00″N 103°25′06″W

Galena Creek is a stream in the U.S. state of South Dakota.

Galena Creek was so named on account of valuable deposits of galena ore.

== See also ==
- List of rivers of South Dakota
