= Spirit Mound Historic Prairie =

State park in Clay County, South Dakota, US

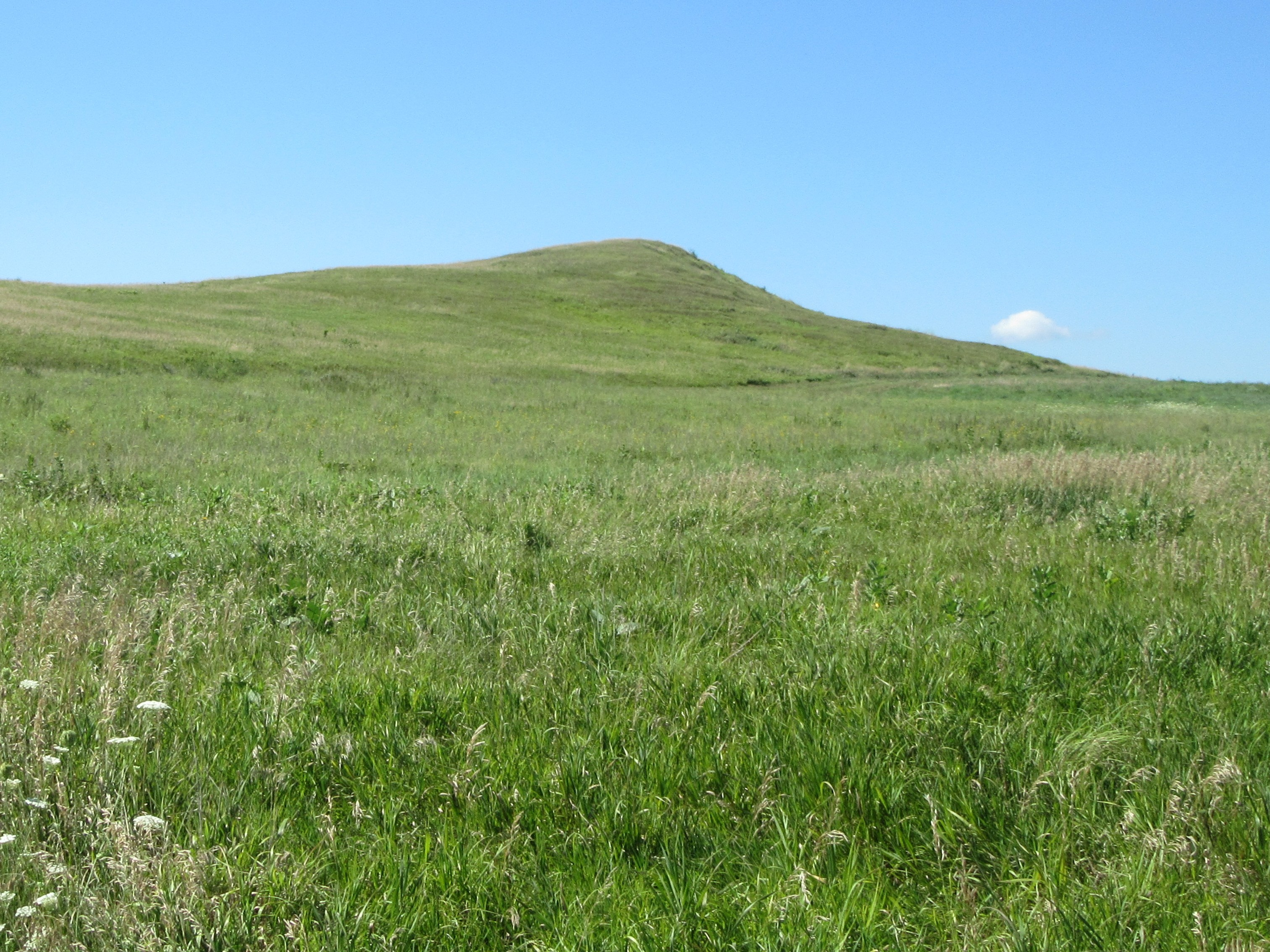
- Spirit Mound

- Location within South Dakota
- Location: Clay County, South Dakota, United States
- Coordinates: 42°52′28″N 96°57′31″W
- Area: 320 acres (130 ha)
- Elevation: 1,309 ft (399 m)
- Established: 2001
- Administrator: South Dakota Department of Game, Fish and Parks
- Website: Official website

Spirit Mound Historic Prairie is a state park in Clay County, South Dakota, United States, featuring a prominent hill on the Great Plains. The Plains Indians of the region considered Spirit Mound the home of dangerous spirits or little people; members of the Lewis and Clark Expedition climbed it on August 25, 1804. The park was established in 2002. It is located about 6.5 miles (10.5 km) north of Vermillion, South Dakota.

== Spirit Mound ==
Stories and religious beliefs about "Little People" are common to many if not most Native American tribes in the West. In 1804, the Lewis and Clark Expedition stayed for a time with a band of Wičhíyena Sioux on the Vermillion River in modern-day South Dakota. On August 25, Meriwether Lewis, William Clark, and 10 other men traveled about 9 miles (14 km) north of the river's junction with the Missouri River to see the "mountain of the Little People". Lewis wrote in his journal that the Little People were "deavals" (devils) with very large heads, about 18 inches (46 cm) high, and very alert to any intrusions into their territory. The Sioux said that the devils carried sharp arrows which could strike at a very long distance, and that they killed anyone who approached their mound. The Little People so terrified the local population, Lewis reported, that the Maha (Omaha), Ottoes (Otoe), and Sioux would not go near the place. The Lakota people who came to live near the "Spirit Mound" after the Wičhíyena Sioux have a story no more than 250 years old which describes how a band of 350 warriors came near the mound late at night and were nearly wiped out by the ferocious Little People (the survivors were crippled for life).

Due to extensive damming of the Missouri River, Spirit Mound is one of the few places which historians can identify as precisely a spot upon which Lewis and Clark stood.

== History ==
Spirit Mound was in private hands for many decades, leading to extensive degradation of the site's original status. White settlers first came to the area in 1868, and used it for grazing livestock and for farming. Five separate landowners owned parts of the site in the early 1980s. More than 20 buildings, a feedlot, soybean fields, cornfields, several roads, 1,500 non-native trees, and 5 miles (8.0 km) of fence dotted the site.

Several local citizens formed the Spirit Mound Trust in 1986 in an attempt to preserve the site. The group received funding boosts and publicity with the 1996 publication of the book Undaunted Courage (about the Lewis and Clark Expedition) and the 1997 Ken Burns documentary Lewis & Clark: The Journey of the Corps of Discovery. After years of lobbying, the federal government's Land and Water Conservation Fund provided $600,000 to acquire the site. The donation required that the State of South Dakota establish the site as a state park, while the Spirit Mound Trust would restore it, provide interpretational signage and tours, and raise $500,000 for the site's long-term preservation. The 320-acre (130 ha) site was purchased from the private landowners in 2001. On July 29, 2001, Senator Tim Johnson presented a symbolic check for $600,000 for the purchase of Spirit Mound and the surrounding land.

In 2004 the United States Department of the Interior designated the trail leading to the summit of Spirit Mound as a National Recreation Trail.

The Spirit Mound Creek runs right past the Mound, on its southern side.

Some controversy has surrounded the establishment of the state park. In 2001 a few local Native American leaders expressed dismay that a site sacred and terrifying to local tribes would be treated as a "fun" place to visit.

== See also ==
- Missouri National Recreational River
