= Pine Creek (Little White River tributary) =

Stream in South Dakota, U.S.

Coordinates: 43°35′04″N 100°46′01″W

Pine Creek is a stream in the U.S. state of South Dakota. It is a tributary of Little White River.

Pine Creek was named for the pine trees lining its course.

== See also ==
- List of rivers of South Dakota
