= Scalp Creek =

Stream system in South Dakota, USA

Scalp Creek is a stream system in Gregory County in the U.S. state of South Dakota. According to the GNIS, it consists of North Scalp Creek and South Scalp Creek. Both are right-bank tributaries of the Missouri River, draining into Lake Francis Case.

Scalp Creek received its name from an incident when a man was scalped by Sioux Indians. In January 2024, South Dakota state senator Shawn Bordeaux proposed to change its name to "Naca Topa," meaning "Four Chiefs," but it was opposed by the South Dakota Department of Game, Fish, and Parks.

== See also ==
- List of rivers of South Dakota
