= Mixes Food Creek =

Stream in South Dakota, U.S.

Coordinates: 44°27′59″N 102°04′20″W

Mixes Food Creek is a tributary of the Cheyenne River, located in Pennington County, South Dakota, United States.

Mixes Food Creek takes its name from Mixes Food, a Sioux Indian who settled there.

== See also ==
- List of rivers of South Dakota
