= Rapid Creek (South Dakota) =

Stream in South Dakota, U.S.

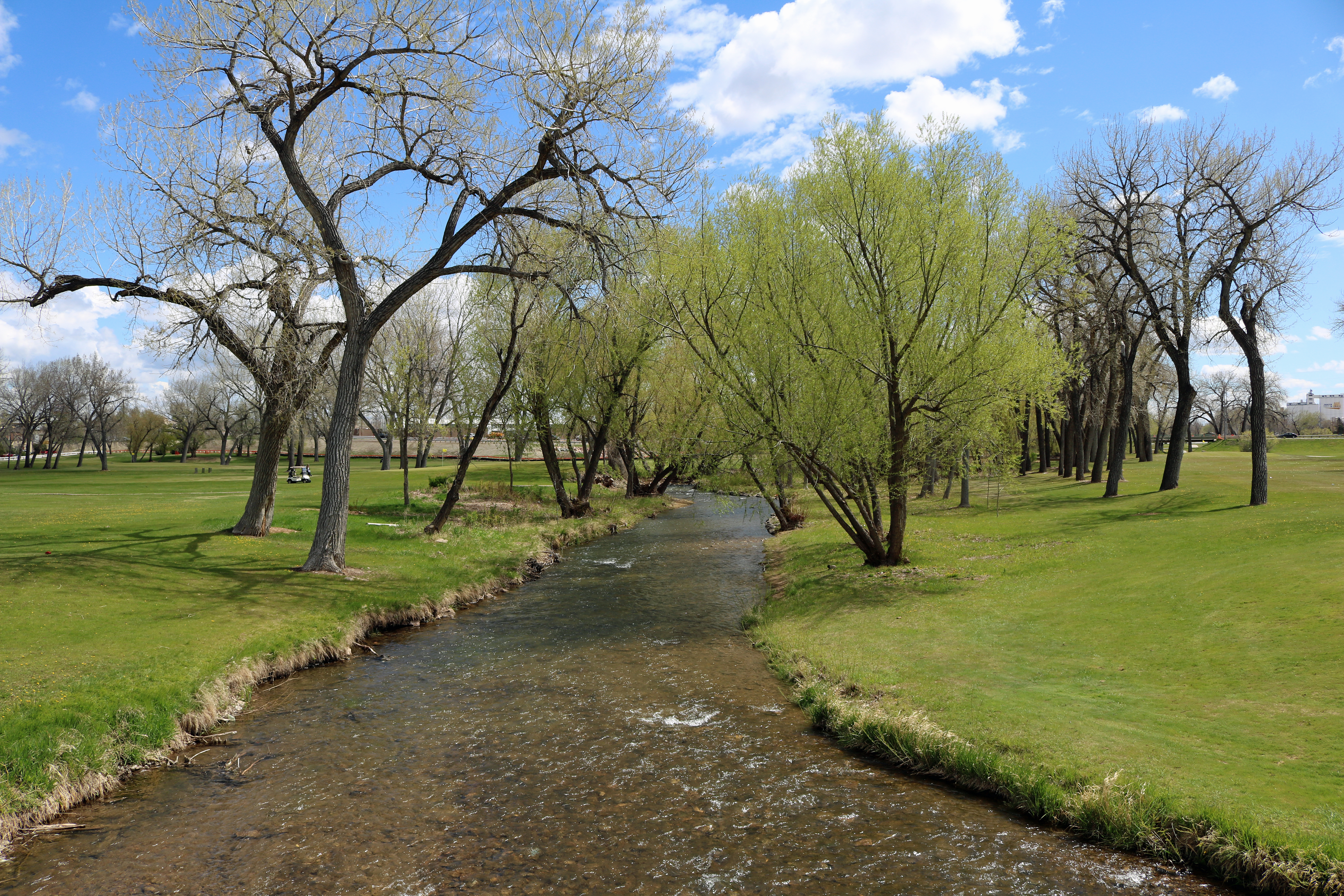
- The creek in Rapid City's Founders Park

- Location of Rapid Creek mouth Rapid Creek (South Dakota) (the United States)

Location
- Country: United States
- State: South Dakota
- County: Pennington
- City: Rapid City

Physical characteristics
- Source: confluence of North Fork and South Fork of Rapid Creek
  - location: about 2 miles (3.2 km) east-southeast of Hausle Ranch, South Dakota
  - coordinates: 44°07′52″N 103°44′10″W
  - elevation: 5,364 ft (1,635 m)
- Mouth: Cheyenne River
  - location: about 8 miles southeast of Farmingdale, South Dakota
  - coordinates: 43°54′17″N 102°37′44″W
  - elevation: 2,441 ft (744 m)
- Length: 117.89 mi (189.73 km)
- Basin size: 715.18 square miles (1,852.3 km^{2})
- Discharge
  - location: Cheyenne River
  - average: 93.07 cu ft/s (2.635 m^{3}/s) at mouth with Cheyenne River

Basin features
- Progression: Cheyenne River → Missouri River → Mississippi River
- River system: Cheyenne
- Tributaries
  - left: North Fork Rapid Creek, Irish Gulch, Moonshine Gulch, Silver Creek, Blind Gulch, Benner Gulch, Minnesota Gulch, Gimlet Creek, Fall Draw, Spurgeon Gulch, Post Draw, Goose Pasture Draw, Gorman Gulch, Sunnyside Gulch, Boarding House Gulch, Deer Creek, Irishman Gulch
  - right: South Fork Rapid Creek, Smith Gulch, Poverty Gulch, Bearcat Gulch, Cluder Gulch, Castle Creek, Slate Creek, Stewart Gulch, Nugget Gulch, Empress Gulch, Magpie Gulch, Bear Gulch, Custer Gulch, McCurdy Gulch, Tamarack Gulch, Powerhouse Gulch, Prairie Creek, Victoria Creek, Dry Creek, Lindsey Draw,
- Waterbodies: Pactula Reservoir, Canyon Lake

Rapid Creek is a tributary of the Cheyenne River, approximately 86 mi (138 km) long, in South Dakota, United States. The creek's name comes from the Sioux Indians of the area, for the many rapids in the stream.

== Course ==
It rises in southwestern South Dakota, in the Black Hills National Forest in Pennington County. It flows east, is joined by Castle Creek, past Silver City and through the Pactola Reservoir. Emerging from the Black Hills, it flows through Rapid City, past Farmingdale, and joins the Cheyenne River approximately 13 mi (21 km) southwest of Wasta.

== 1972 flood ==
The Rapid Creek is most noted for the Black Hills flood of 1972, in which 238 people perished in Rapid City and the Black Hills area. Since the flood, a flood plain has been established throughout the city making development along the banks inconsiderable.

== See also ==
- Gimlet Creek, tributary
- List of rivers of South Dakota
