= North Scalp Creek =

Coordinates: 43°08′02″N 98°51′43″W

North Scalp Creek is a stream system in the U.S. state of South Dakota.

Scalp Creek received its name from an incident when a man was scalped by Sioux Indians.

== See also ==
- List of rivers of South Dakota
- Scalp Creek
- South Scalp Creek
