= Gap Creek (South Dakota) =

Stream in South Dakota, U.S.

Coordinates: 45°26′53″N 102°51′33″W

Gap Creek is a stream in the U.S. state of South Dakota.

Gap Creek takes its name from nearby Reva Gap.

== See also ==
- List of rivers of South Dakota
