= Park Creek =

Park Creek can refer to:

- Park Creek (Plateau Creek) in Colorado
- Park Creek (Little Neshaminy Creek) in Pennsylvania
- Park Creek (Bear Butte Creek) in South Dakota
- Park Creek (Baker River) in Washington
