= Battle Creek (Cheyenne River tributary) =

Stream in South Dakota, U.S.

Coordinates: 43°41′22″N 102°49′02″W

Battle Creek is a stream in the U.S. state of South Dakota. It is a tributary of the Cheyenne River, traversing Oglala Lakota and Pennington counties and the town of Keystone.

Battle Creek was named for a skirmish between two indigenous tribes.

Battle Creek is fed by Iron Creek.

== See also ==
- Grizzly Bear Creek, tributary
- Iron Creek, tributary
- List of rivers of South Dakota
