= Park Creek (Bear Butte Creek tributary) =

River in South Dakota, United States

Coordinates: 44°21′20″N 103°35′29″W

Park Creek is a stream in the U.S. state of South Dakota. It is a tributary of Bear Butte Creek.

Park Creek was named from its natural park-like setting.

== See also ==
- List of rivers of South Dakota
