= Stinking Water Creek (Little White River tributary) =

Stream in South Dakota, U.S.

Coordinates: 43°06′09″N 102°00′58″W

Stinking Water Creek is a stream in the U.S. state of South Dakota. It is a tributary of Little White River.

Stinking Water Creek's name comes from the Sioux Indians of the area, on account of the naturally occurring unpleasant odor along its course.

== See also ==
- List of rivers of South Dakota
