= Keg Creek Township, Pottawattamie County, Iowa =

Township in Pottawattamie County, Iowa, U.S.

Coordinates: 41.1964°N 95.6511°W

Keg Creek Township is a township in Pottawattamie County, Iowa, United States.

== History ==
Keg Creek Township was established in 1873. It took its name from Keg Creek.
