= Franklin Creek =

Franklin Creek may refer to:

- Franklin Creek (South Dakota), a stream
- Franklin Creek State Park, a state park in Illinois
