= Jim Creek (Boxelder Creek tributary) =

Stream in South Dakota, U.S.

Coordinates: 44°09′07″N 103°28′10″W

Jim Creek is a stream in the U.S. state of South Dakota. It is a tributary of Boxelder Creek.

Jim Creek has the name of Jim Riley, a pioneer settler.

== See also ==
- List of rivers of South Dakota
