= Hump Creek =

Hump Creek may refer to:

- Hump Creek (Corson County, South Dakota)
- Hump Creek (Haakon County, South Dakota)
