= Fall River (South Dakota) =

- Etymology: Lakota People
- Native name: Mní Woblú (Lakota)

Location
- Country: United States
- State: South Dakota
- Counties: Fall River
- Cities: Hot Springs, South Dakota

Physical characteristics
- Source: Confluence of Hot Brook and Cold Brook
  - location: Hot Springs, South Dakota
  - coordinates: 43°26′34″N 103°28′55″W
  - elevation: 3,064 ft (934 m)
- Mouth: Cheyenne River
  - location: South of Maverick Junction, South Dakota
  - coordinates: 43°23′08″N 103°24′13″W
  - elevation: 3,030 ft (920 m)

Fall River (Lakota: Mní Woblú) a river in Fall River County, South Dakota. The river is the namesake of Fall River County.

Fall River was so named on account of its relatively steep stream gradient.

== See also ==
- List of rivers of South Dakota
