= Sulphur Creek (South Dakota) =

Stream in South Dakota, U.S.

Coordinates: 44°45′05″N 102°17′22″W

Sulphur Creek is a stream in the U.S. state of South Dakota.

The creek is a sulphur spring, hence the name.

== See also ==
- List of rivers of South Dakota
