= Bear-in-the-Lodge Creek =

Stream in South Dakota, U.S.

Coordinates: 43°41′16″N 101°50′24″W

Bear-in-the-Lodge Creek is a stream in the U.S. state of South Dakota.

Tradition has it Bear-in-the-Lodge Creek received its name from an incident when a bear entered an Indian village near the creek.

== See also ==
- List of rivers of South Dakota
