= Bridger Creek =

River in South Dakota, U.S.

Coordinates: 44°31′48″N 101°55′24″W

Bridger Creek is a stream in the U.S. state of South Dakota.

Bridger Creek has the name of Jim Bridger, an explorer.

== See also ==
- List of rivers of South Dakota
