= Flandreau Creek =

- Location of mouth

Location
- Country: United States
- States: Minnesota, South Dakota
- Counties: Lincoln, Pipestone Counties, Minnesota, Moody County, South Dakota

Physical characteristics
- Mouth
  - coordinates: 44.0583042°N 96.5544895°W
- Length: 41.0 mi (66.0 km)

Flandreau Creek is a 41.0-mile-long (66.0 km) river in Minnesota and South Dakota.

The creek was named for Charles Eugene Flandrau, an Indian fighter.

== See also ==
- List of rivers of Minnesota
- List of rivers of South Dakota

== Bibliography ==
- "Minnesota Watersheds". Minnesota Department of Natural Resources.
- USGS Hydrologic Unit Map - State of Minnesota (1974)
