= Moccasin Creek (South Dakota) =

Stream in South Dakota, U.S.

Coordinates: 45°21′28″N 98°18′26″W

Moccasin Creek is a stream in the U.S. state of South Dakota.

The stream's flow begins just north of Aberdeen, flowing south through Aberdeen until it meets and flows into the James River. Foot Creek flows into Moccasin Creek on the south side of Aberdeen's border.

Moccasin Creek most likely derives its name from "moccasin flower" a variant name of Cypripedioideae.

Moccasin Creek Country Club is named after this stream.

== See also ==
- List of rivers of South Dakota
