= Pierre Creek =

Stream in South Dakota, U.S.

Coordinates: 43°36′50″N 97°50′35″W

Pierre Creek is a stream in the U.S. state of South Dakota.

Pierre Creek has the name of Pierre Dansreau, an early settler.

== See also ==
- List of rivers of South Dakota
