= Franklin Creek (South Dakota) =

Stream in South Dakota, U.S.

Coordinates: 43°53′07″N 101°33′47″W

Franklin Creek is a stream in the U.S. state of South Dakota.

Franklin Creek was named after a local cattleman.

== See also ==
- List of rivers of South Dakota
