= Minnechaduza Creek =

Stream in Nebraska and South Dakota, U.S.

Coordinates: 42°53′54″N 100°29′05″W

Minnechaduza Creek is a stream in the U.S. states of Nebraska and South Dakota.

Minnechaduza is a name derived from a Dakota language word meaning "running water".

== See also ==
- List of rivers of South Dakota
