= Irish Creek (South Dakota) =

Stream in South Dakota, United States

Coordinates: 45°13′38″N 101°33′59″W

Irish Creek is a stream in the U.S. state of South Dakota.

A large share of the first settlers being natives of Ireland most likely caused the name Irish Creek to be selected.

== See also ==
- List of rivers of South Dakota
