= Jim Creek (James River tributary) =

Stream in South Dakota, U.S.

Coordinates: 43°56′04″N 98°00′25″W

Jim Creek is a stream in the U.S. state of South Dakota. Jim Creek derives its name from the James River, of which it is a tributary.

== See also ==
- List of rivers of South Dakota
