= Minneconjou Creek =

Stream in South Dakota, U.S.

Coordinates: 44°46′16″N 100°54′51″W

Minneconjou Creek is a stream in the U.S. state of South Dakota.

Minneconjou Creek has the name of the Minneconjou Indians.

== See also ==
- List of rivers of South Dakota
