= Gallup Creek =

Stream in South Dakota, U.S.

- Gallup Creek, South Dakota

Location
- Country: United States
- State: South Dakota
- County: Harding

Physical characteristics
- Source
  - elevation: 3,280 feet (1,000 m)
- Mouth: Little Missouri River
  - coordinates: 45.75583°N 103.87409°W
  - elevation: 3,002 feet (915 m)

Basin features
- Waterbodies: Peterson Reservoir

Gallup Creek is a stream in the U.S. state of South Dakota.

Gallup Creek has the name of Henry Gallup, a local pioneer.

== See also ==
- List of rivers of South Dakota
