= Wagonhound Creek =

Stream in South Dakota, U.S.

Coordinates: 44°20′34″N 101°01′13″W

Wagonhound Creek is a stream in the U.S. state of South Dakota.

Wagonhound Creek was named for the fact old wagon parts (specifically, "wagon hounds") were left along its course.

== See also ==
- List of rivers of South Dakota
