= Maple River (North Dakota–South Dakota) =

Stream in North Dakota and South Dakota, U.S.

Coordinates: 45°46′57″N 98°32′58″W

Maple River is a stream in the U.S. states of North Dakota and South Dakota.

Maple River was named for the maple trees along its course.

== See also ==
- List of rivers of North Dakota
- List of rivers of South Dakota
