= Big Nasty Creek =

Stream in South Dakota, U.S.

Coordinates: 45°41′02″N 102°50′31″W

Big Nasty Creek is a stream in the U.S. state of South Dakota.

Some believe Big Nasty received its name from its discolored water, others say the stream was "nasty to cross", while still others say the name was descriptive of the cowboys, who frequented the area.

== See also ==
- List of rivers of South Dakota
- Nasty Creek
