= Frozen Man Creek (Plum Creek tributary) =

Stream in South Dakota, U.S.

Coordinates: 44°17′00″N 100°55′38″W

Frozen Man Creek is a stream in the U.S. state of South Dakota. It is a tributary of Plum Creek.

Frozen Man Creek received its name from an incident, when a party of people froze to death near it.

== See also ==
- List of rivers of South Dakota
