= Marne Creek =

Stream in South Dakota, U.S.

Coordinates: 42°52′01″N 97°22′47″W

Marne Creek is a stream in the U.S. state of South Dakota. It is a tributary of the Missouri River and flows through Yankton County. The Auld-Brokaw Multi-Use Trail follows the creek as it travels through the city of Yankton before joining the Missouri.

Marne Creek was named Rhine Creek until anti-German sentiment during World War I caused the present name to be selected.

== See also ==
- List of rivers of South Dakota
