= Lone Well Creek =

Stream in South Dakota, U.S.

Coordinates: 43°11′50″N 103°13′51″W

Lone Well Creek is a stream in the U.S. state of South Dakota.

Lone Well Creek received its name from a pioneer's well near its course.

== See also ==
- List of rivers of South Dakota
