= Two Bit Creek =

American stream

Coordinates: 44°23′14″N 103°37′52″W

Two Bit Creek is a stream in the U.S. state of South Dakota.

Some say the stream was a "two-bit creek" (i.e. a small creek), hence its name, while others believe local prospectors found two "bits" of gold, causing the name to be selected.

"Early in the Spring of 1877, father left Galesburg again, this time successfully reaching Deadwood. He located mines on a little stream which he named Two Bit Creek because the bits of gold washed out in a placer mining pan so often yielded that amount - two bits or twenty-five cents."

== See also ==
- List of rivers of South Dakota
