= Snake Creek (James River tributary) =

Stream in South Dakota

Coordinates: 44°57′35″N 98°29′42″W

Snake Creek is a stream in the U.S. state of South Dakota. It is a tributary of James River.

Snake Creek was so named on account of its frequent meanders.

== See also ==
- List of rivers of South Dakota
