= McPherson Creek =

Stream in Harding County, South Dakota, U.S.

Coordinates: 45°36′11″N 103°06′24″W

McPherson Creek is a stream in Harding County, South Dakota, United States.

McPherson Creek is named after Adam McPherson, a pioneer who settled there.

== See also ==
- List of rivers of South Dakota
