= Buzzard Creek =

Stream in South Dakota, United States

Coordinates: 44°02′59″N 101°24′21″W

Buzzard Creek is a stream in the U.S. state of South Dakota.

Buzzard Creek originally was a natural habitat of buzzards, hence the name.

== See also ==
- List of rivers of South Dakota
