= Choteau Creek =

Stream in South Dakota, U.S.

Coordinates: 42°50′33″N 98°09′12″W

Choteau Creek (Lakota: Nawízi Kičhízapi) is a stream in the U.S. state of South Dakota.

Choteau Creek has the name of the Chouteau family.

== See also ==
- List of rivers of South Dakota
