= Rabbit Creek (South Dakota) =

Stream in South Dakota, U.S.

Rabbit Creek is a stream in the U.S. state of South Dakota. It is a tributary of the Moreau River.

Some say Rabbit Creek takes its name from nearby Rabbit Butte, while others believe the creek was named after the wild rabbits along its course.

== Pickles Creek ==
Pickles Creek (45°18′23″N 102°23′58″W) is a tributary of Rabbit Creek. The creek has the name of Frank "Pickles" Koshirak, a local rancher.

== See also ==
- List of rivers of South Dakota
- Peggy Creek, tributary
