= Baptist Creek (South Dakota) =

Location
- Country: United States

Physical characteristics
- Source
  - location: Clay County, South Dakota
  - coordinates: 43°02′03″N 96°50′10″W
- Mouth
  - location: Clay County, South Dakota
  - coordinates: 42°54′36″N 96°54′56″W

Baptist Creek is a tributary of the Vermillion River, located in the southeastern South Dakota county of Clay.

A large share of the first settlers being Swedish Baptists caused the name to be selected.

== See also ==
- List of rivers of South Dakota
