= Frozen Man Creek (Sulphur Creek tributary) =

Stream in South Dakota, U.S.

Coordinates: 44°52′08″N 102°42′49″W

Frozen Man Creek is a stream in the U.S. state of South Dakota. It is a tributary of Sulphur Creek.

Frozen Man Creek received its name from an incident when a pioneer froze to death near it.

== See also ==
- List of rivers of South Dakota
