= Straighthead Creek =

Stream in Haakon County, South Dakota, U.S.

Coordinates: 44°34′16″N 101°41′19″W

Straighthead Creek is a stream in Haakon County in the U.S. state of South Dakota. It is a tributary of the Cheyenne River.

Straighthead Creek has the name of Straighthead, a local member of the Sioux tribe.

== See also ==
- List of rivers of South Dakota
