= Lightning Creek (South Dakota) =

Stream in South Dakota, U.S.

Coordinates: 43°40′45″N 103°42′53″W

Lightning Creek is a stream in the U.S. state of South Dakota.

Some say the creek takes its name from nearby Lightning Mountain, while others believe the creek so named on account of frequent storms over it.

== See also ==
- List of rivers of South Dakota
