= Cut Meat Creek =

Stream in South Dakota, U.S.

Coordinates: 43°24′31″N 100°50′06″W

Cut Meat Creek is a stream in the U.S. state of South Dakota.

Cut Meat Creek was so named for the fact cows were butchered there.

== See also ==
- List of rivers of South Dakota
