= Shue Creek =

Stream in South Dakota, U.S.

Coordinates: 44°26′30″N 98°06′55″W

Shue Creek is a stream in the U.S. state of South Dakota.

== History ==
According to tradition, a lost shoe caused the name to be selected.

== See also ==
- List of rivers of South Dakota
