= Black Pipe Creek =

Stream in South Dakota, U.S.

Coordinates: 43°47′08″N 101°13′51″W

Black Pipe Creek is a stream in the U.S. state of South Dakota.

Black Pipe Creek received its name from the fact Indians obtained black shale from the area in order to make their pipes.

== See also ==
- List of rivers of South Dakota
