= Rudy Creek =

Stream in South Dakota, United States

Coordinates: 44°43′50″N 101°08′58″W

Rudy Creek is a stream in Ziebach County in the U.S. state of South Dakota. It is a left-bank tributary close to the mouth of the Cheyenne River, draining into Lake Oahe.

A variant name was Rudey Creek. The stream has the name of an early cattleman.

== See also ==
- List of rivers of South Dakota
