= Witcher Holes Creek =

River in South Dakota, U.S.

Coordinates: 44°03′09″N 101°22′18″W

Witcher Holes Creek is a stream in the U.S. state of South Dakota.

Witcher Holes Creek derives its name from Harry Witcher, an early settler, the creek forming pools of water or "holes" when it runs dry.

== See also ==
- List of rivers of South Dakota
