= Mosquito Creek (Iowa) =

Stream in Iowa, U.S.

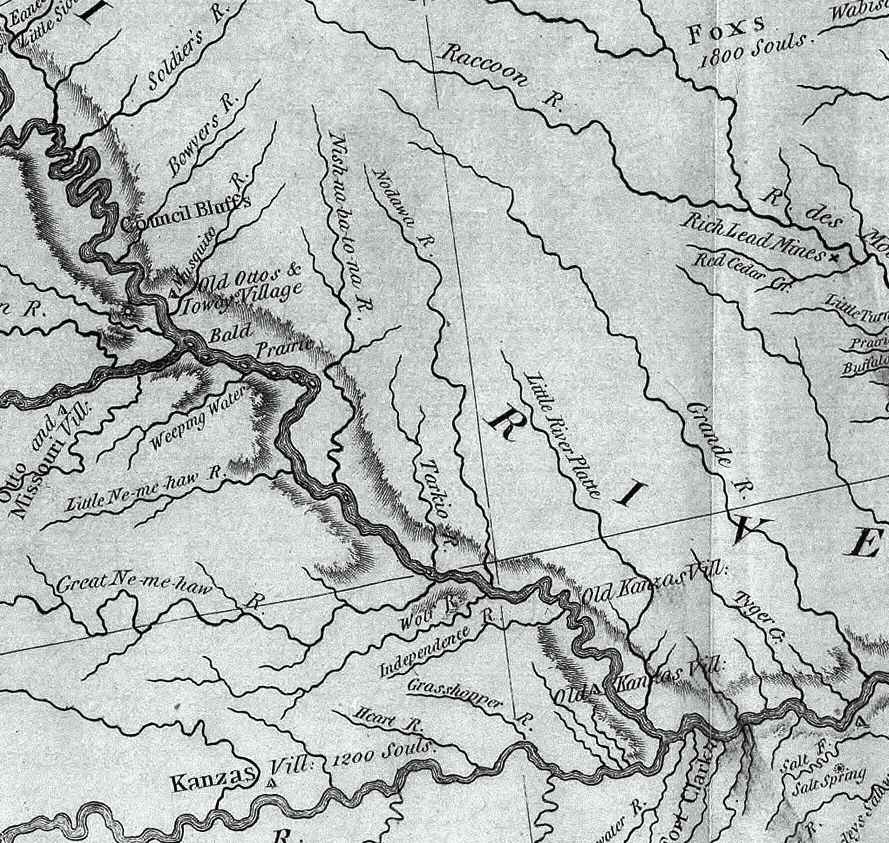
- This excerpt from the Lewis and Clark map of 1814 shows the rivers of southwest Iowa, southeast Nebraska, and northwest Missouri. "Musquito River" is seen at the upper left.

Location
- Country: US
- State: Iowa

Physical characteristics
- Source
  - coordinates: 41°48′18″N 95°22′44″W
- Mouth
  - coordinates: 41°10′34″N 95°50′25″W

Mosquito Creek, about 60 mi. (97 km) long, is a tributary of the Missouri River in southwest Iowa in the United States. It rises near Earling, in Shelby County, and flows in a generally southwesterly direction, meeting the Missouri approximately 5 mi. (8 km) downstream of Council Bluffs.

Mosquito Creek was named by pioneer settlers (Mormons) for the great number of mosquitoes near this stream when they camped there.

== See also ==
- List of Iowa rivers
- Tributaries of the Missouri River
