= Beverly Creek =

Stream in South Dakota, United States

Coordinates: 45°06′52″N 102°51′00″W

Beverly Creek is a stream in the U.S. state of South Dakota.

The creek is named after Tom Beverly, a local rancher.

== See also ==
- List of rivers of South Dakota
