= Stinkingwater Creek (Belle Fourche River tributary) =

Stream in South Dakota, U.S.

Coordinates: 44°40′10″N 103°33′32″W

Stinkingwater Creek is a stream in the U.S. state of South Dakota. It is a tributary of Belle Fourche River.

Stinkingwater Creek was named for the naturally occurring unpleasant odor along its course.

== See also ==
- List of rivers of South Dakota
