= Tetro Creek =

Stream in South Dakota, U.S.

Coordinates: 44°27′55″N 103°47′26″W

Tetro Creek is a stream in the U.S. state of South Dakota. It is a tributary of False Bottom Creek, joining it at Black Hills Airport.

Tetro Creek has the name of a local family.

== See also ==
- List of rivers of South Dakota
