= Spirit Mound Creek =

Coordinates: 42°48′47″N 96°56′05″W

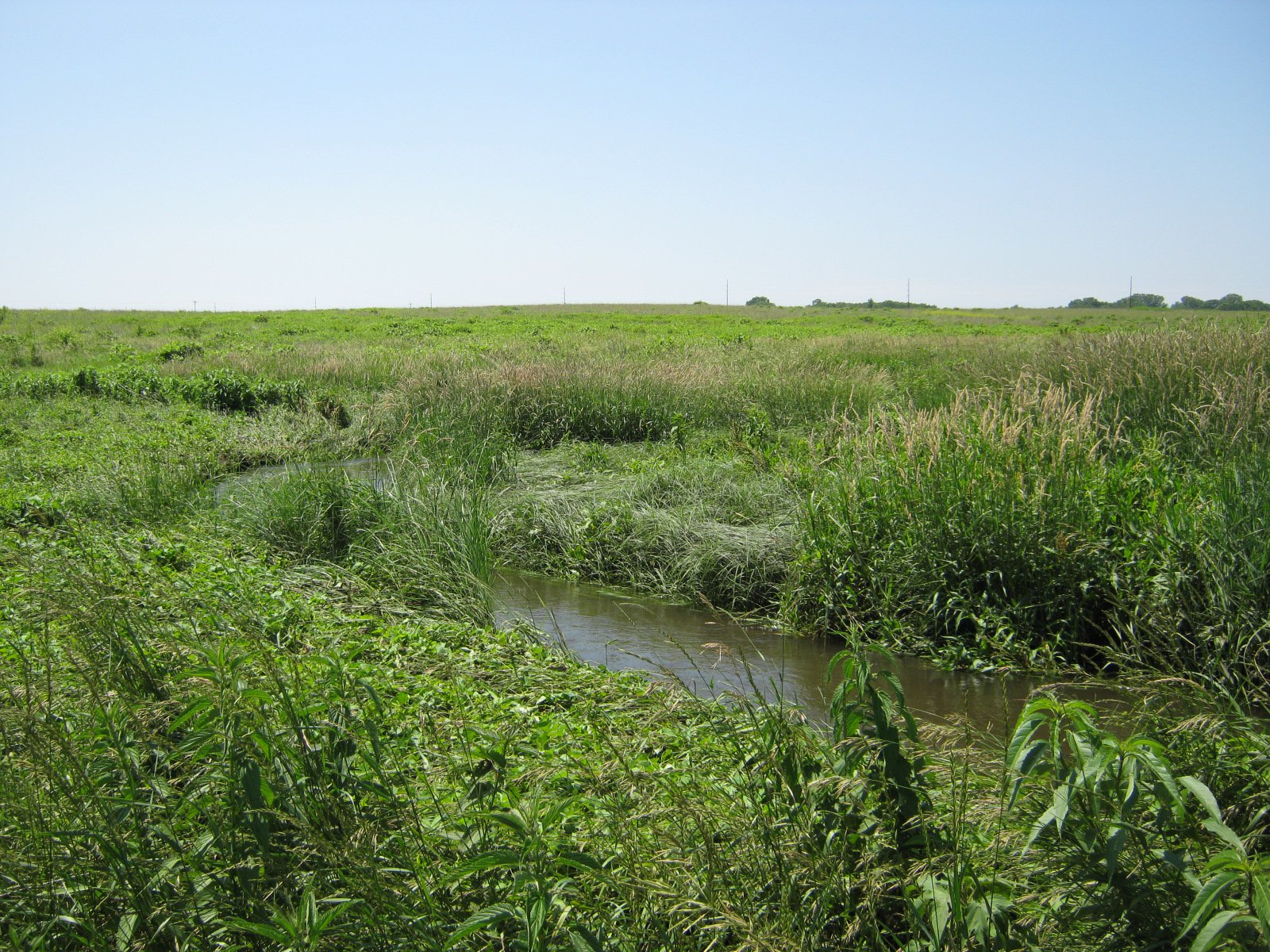
- Spirit Mound Creek

Location
- Country: United States

Physical characteristics
- Source
  - location: South Dakota

Spirit Mound Creek is a tributary of the Vermillion River, located in southeastern Clay County, South Dakota. It passes through the Spirit Mound Historic Prairie.

== See also ==
- List of rivers of South Dakota
