= Lakota Lake =

Lake in the state of South Dakota, United States

- Location of Lakota Lake in South Dakota
- Location: Custer County, South Dakota
- Coordinates: 43.8498194°N 103.3979263°W
- Primary inflows: Iron Creek, Toll Gate Creek
- Primary outflows: Iron Creek
- Surface elevation: 4,472 ft (1,363 m)

Lakota Lake is a small lake in the Norbeck Wildlife Preserve of Custer County, South Dakota.

Motorized watercraft are not permitted in the lake, but fishing and kayaking are. Common fish in the lake include rainbow trout, brook trout, northern pike, and panfish.

The lake is fed by Iron Creek, a long, winding creek that flows through Pennington County and Custer County. The lake forms just north of where U.S. Route 16A (Iron Mountain Road) crosses the creek. Iron Creek drains the lake to the northeast, flowing east until it meets Battle Creek, a tributary of the Cheyenne River.
