= Keg Creek =

Stream in Iowa, U.S.

Coordinates: 40°58′30″N 95°49′36″W

Keg Creek is a stream in Mills, Pottawattamie, Harrison and Shelby counties, in the U.S. state of Iowa. It is a direct tributary of the Missouri River.

Keg Creek was named from the fact bootleggers rolled barrels of whisky in the creek in order to hide them from liquor control agents.

== See also ==
- List of rivers of Iowa
- Tributaries of the Missouri River
