= Redwater River (South Dakota) =

- Etymology: Lakota People
- Native name: Mniša-Wakpála (Lakota)

Location
- Country: United States
- State: South Dakota
- Counties: Butte County, Lawrence County
- Cities: Belle Fourche, South Dakota

Physical characteristics
- Source: Confluence of Redwater Creek and Crow Creek
  - location: Butte County, South Dakota
  - coordinates: 44°34′27″N 104°00′15″W
  - elevation: 3,363 ft (1,025 m)
- Mouth: Belle Fourche River
  - location: Belle Fourche, South Dakota
  - coordinates: 44°40′21″N 103°50′43″W
  - elevation: 3,117 ft (950 m)

Redwater River is a river located in Butte and Lawrence counties in South Dakota, United States; it is a tributary of the Belle Fourche River. Its mouth is in the city of Belle Fourche.

== History ==
The town of Belle Fourche was settled at the end of the 19th century during the time when much of the Black Hills was receiving an influx of settlers. Its name, meaning "Beautiful Fork" in French, refers to the confluence of the Redwater River with the Belle Fourche River. This area was originally the site of the S&B Ranch, established by Seth Bullock and Sol Star.

== Wildlife ==
The Redwater River is home to many of the typical freshwater species of the region, including the creek chub, finescale dace, river shiner, shorthead redhorse, white sucker, and the mountain sucker

== See also ==
- List of rivers in South Dakota
