= Moss Agate Creek =

Stream in the U.S. state of South Dakota

Coordinates: 43°23′56″N 103°56′21″W

Moss Agate Creek is a stream in the U.S. state of South Dakota.

Moss Agate Creek derives its name from deposits of moss agate.

== See also ==
- List of rivers of South Dakota
