= Bullhead Run =

Stream in South Dakota, United States

Coordinates: 44°34′31″N 96°55′52″W

Bullhead Run is a stream in the U.S. state of South Dakota.

Bullhead Run was named after the bullhead fish.

== See also ==
- List of rivers of South Dakota
