= Boxelder Creek (Cheyenne River tributary) =

Stream in South Dakota, U.S.

Coordinates: 44°00′51″N 102°28′00″W

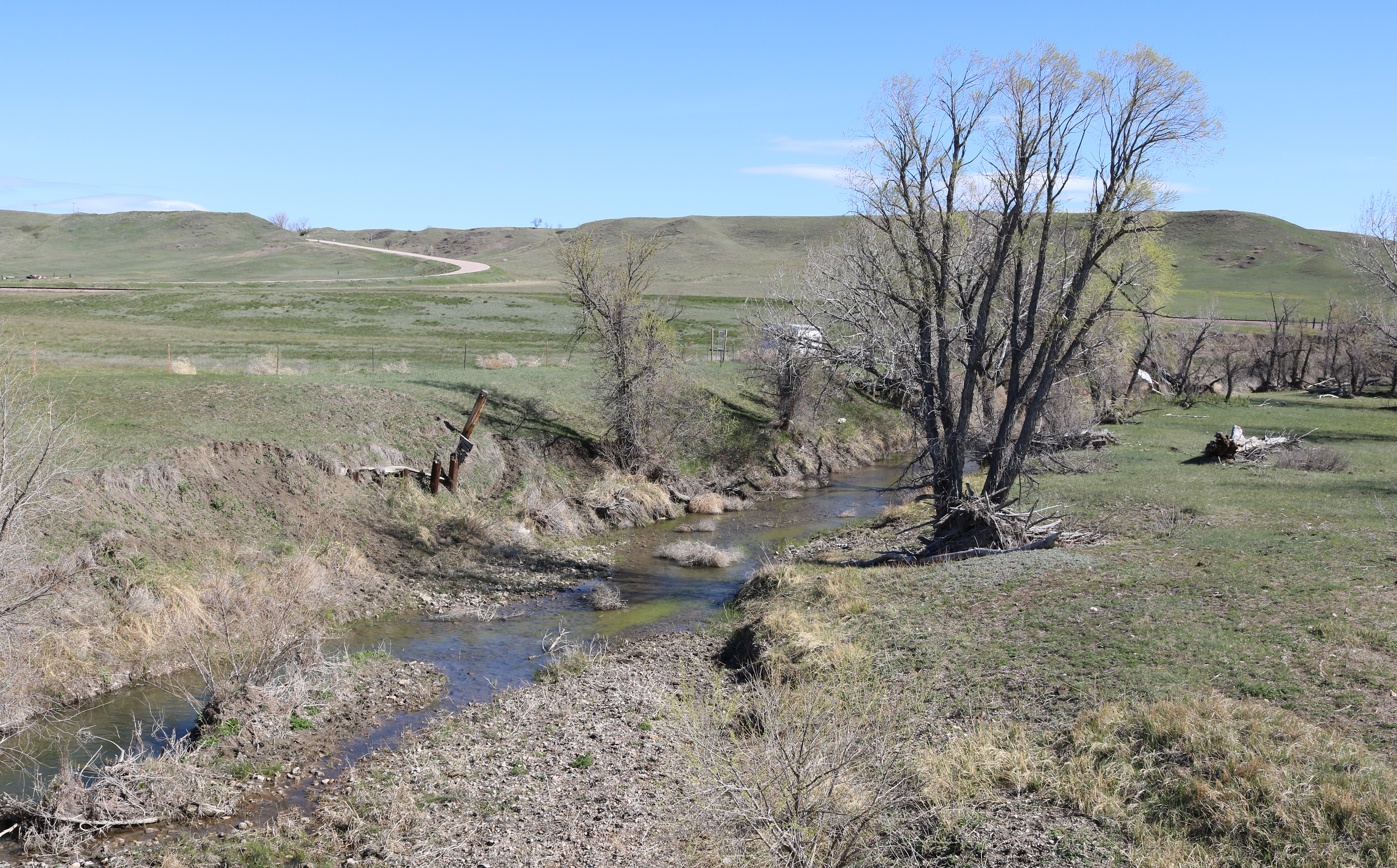
The creek near Owanka in Pennington County.

Boxelder Creek is a stream in Pennington, Meade and Lawrence counties, South Dakota, in the United States. It is a tributary of the Cheyenne River.

Boxelder Creek was named for the box elder growing along its banks.

== See also ==
- List of rivers of South Dakota
