= Fishgut Creek =

Stream in South Dakota, U.S.

Coordinates: 44°46′57″N 100°54′15″W

Fishgut Creek is a stream in the U.S. state of South Dakota.

Fishgut Creek has the name of Fish Gut, a Sioux person who settled nearby.

== See also ==
- List of rivers of South Dakota
