= Edgerton Creek =

Stream in South Dakota, U.S.

Coordinates: 43°20′59″N 98°55′32″W

Edgerton Creek is a stream in the U.S. state of South Dakota.

Edgerton Creek has the name of Alonzo J. Edgerton, a federal judge.

== See also ==
- List of rivers of South Dakota
