= Bogus Jim Creek =

Stream in South Dakota, U.S.

Coordinates: 44.126808°N 103.474980°W

Bogus Jim Creek is a stream in the U.S. state of South Dakota.

According to one tradition the creek has the name of Francis "Bogus Jim" Calabogus, a pioneer settler; another tradition maintains the creek was called "bogus" because it was dry.

== See also ==
- List of rivers of South Dakota
