= Randall Creek =

Stream in Nebraska and South Dakota, U.S.

Coordinates: 43°03′00″N 98°33′01″W

Randall Creek is a stream in the U.S. states of Nebraska and South Dakota. It is a right-bank tributary of the Missouri River with its mouth being immediately below Fort Randall Dam.

Randall Creek took its name from nearby Fort Randall.

== See also ==
- List of rivers of South Dakota
