= Whitewood Creek =

Stream in South Dakota, U.S.

Coordinates: 44.617993°N 103.493977°W

Whitewood Creek is a stream in Butte, Meade and Lawrence counties, in the U.S. state of South Dakota.

Whitewood Creek was named from the white-barked quaking aspen trees along its banks.

== See also ==
- List of rivers of South Dakota
