= Fantail Creek =

Stream in South Dakota, United States

Coordinates: 44°20′12″N 103°47′29″W

Fantail Creek is a stream in the U.S. state of South Dakota.

Fantail Creek was named after the fantail deer observed near it.

== See also ==
- List of rivers of South Dakota
