= Chapelle Creek =

Stream in South Dakota, U.S.

Coordinates: 44°16′33″N 99°55′26″W

Chapelle Creek is a stream in the U.S. state of South Dakota.

Chapelle Creek has the name of David Chapelle, a pioneer trader.

== See also ==
- List of rivers of South Dakota
