= Trunk Creek =

Stream in South Dakota, U.S.

Coordinates: 45°54′44″N 103°30′04″W

Trunk Creek is a stream in the U.S. state of South Dakota.

Trunk Creek received its name from the fact a pioneer left his trunk behind there.

== See also ==
- List of rivers of South Dakota
