= Lame Johnny Creek =

Lame Johnny Creek Burnt Wood Creek
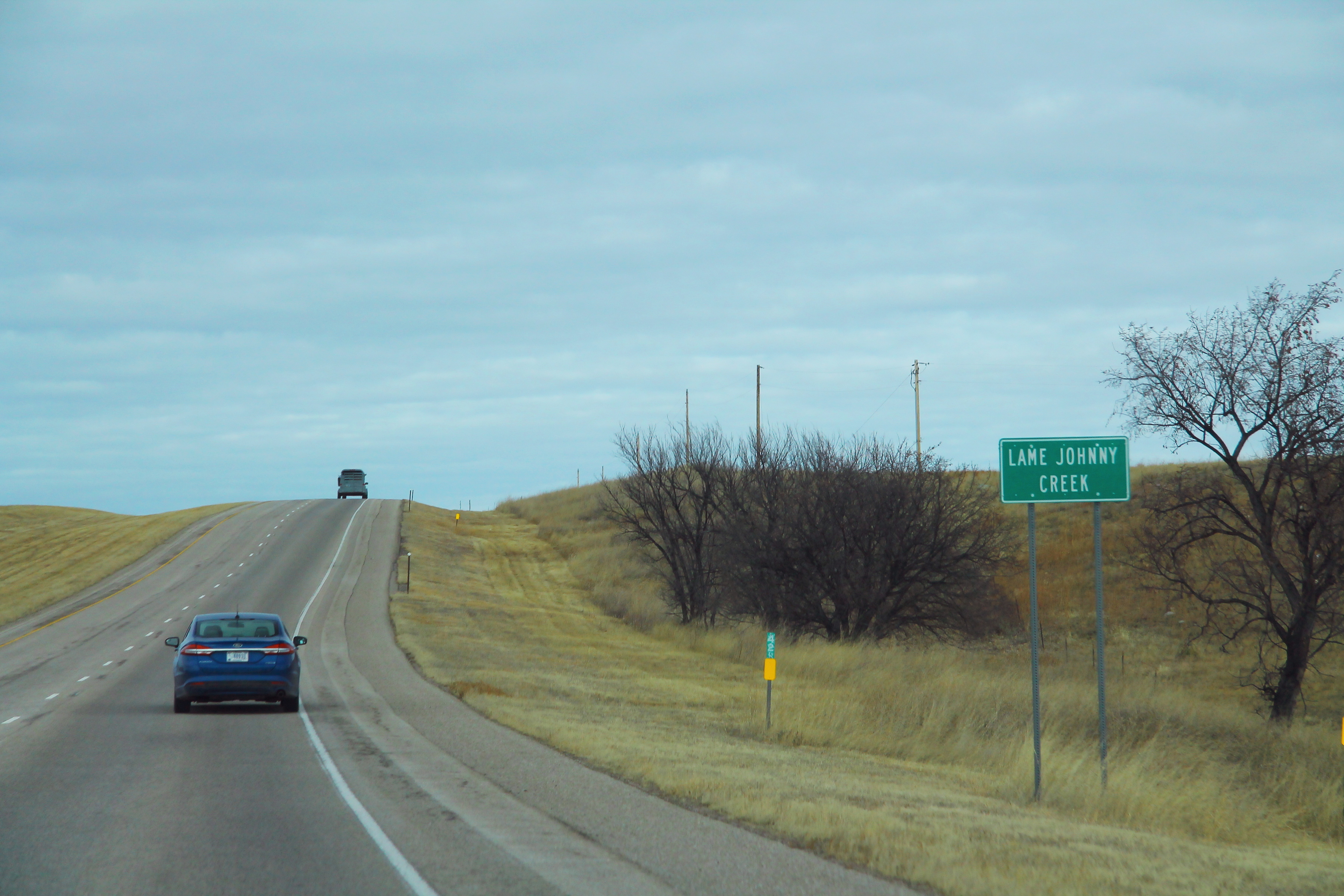
- Lame Johnny Creek's intersection with South Dakota Highway 79

- Lame Johnny Creek mouth location in South Dakota
- Etymology: "Lame Johnny," local outlaw

Location
- Country: Custer County
- State: Fall River County

Physical characteristics
- Source: South fork source
  - coordinates: 43.7044303°N 103.4713047°W
- 2nd source: North fork source
  - coordinates: 43.7144313°N 103.434638°W
- Mouth: Cheyenne River
  - coordinates: 43.4741516°N 103.1035301°W

Basin features
- Progression: Cheyenne River→ Missouri River→ Mississippi River→ Gulf of Mexico
- River system: Cheyenne River system

Lame Johnny Creek is a stream in the U.S. state of South Dakota. It is mostly located in Custer County, with its mouth located in Northern Fall River County. Its mouth is located on the Cheyenne River, which itself flows into the Missouri River about 130 miles downstream. Parts of the river are located in Custer State Park.

Lame Johnny Creek was named after Cornelius Donahue, a highway robber who was lynched by a mob near the creek.

== See also ==
- List of rivers of South Dakota
