= Farmingdale, South Dakota =

Unincorporated community in South Dakota, U.S.

Coordinates: 43°57′33″N 102°53′02″W

Farmingdale is an unincorporated community in Pennington County, in the U.S. state of South Dakota.

== History ==
A post office called Farmingdale was established in 1887, and remained in operation until 1973. A large share of the early settlers being farmers caused the name to be selected.
