= Box Spring Creek =

River in the United States of America

Coordinates: 45°36′54″N 102°25′28″W

Box Spring Creek is a stream in the U.S. state of South Dakota.

Box Spring Creek was named for the fact someone found an old spring there.

== See also ==
- List of rivers of South Dakota
