= Atterbury Creek =

Stream in South Dakota, U.S.

Coordinates: 45°34′35″N 103°18′23″W

Atterbury Creek is a stream in the U.S. state of South Dakota.

Atterbury Creek has the name of a local family which settled there.

== See also ==
- List of rivers of South Dakota
