= Hot Brook =

Stream in South Dakota, United States

Coordinates: 43°26′34″N 103°28′54″W

Hot Brook is a stream in the U.S. state of South Dakota.

Hot Brook is fed by a hot spring, hence the name.

== See also ==
- List of rivers of South Dakota
