= Flint Rock Creek =

Stream in South Dakota, U.S.

Coordinates: 45°11′30″N 101°55′17″W

Flint Rock Creek is a stream in the U.S. state of South Dakota.

Flint Rock Creek was so named on account of the flint rock formations near it.

== See also ==
- List of rivers of South Dakota
