= Chaney Rush Creek =

Stream in South Dakota, U.S.

Coordinates: 44°13′06″N 99°41′05″W

Chaney Rush Creek is a tributary of the Missouri River in the Crow Creek Reservation in the U.S. state of South Dakota.

Chaney Rush is derived from a French phrase meaning "chain of rock".

== See also ==
- List of rivers of South Dakota
