= Slim Butte Creek =

River in South Dakota, United States

Coordinates: 43°11′47″N 102°49′00″W

Slim Butte Creek is a stream in the U.S. state of South Dakota.

Slim Butte Creek takes its name from nearby Slim Butte.

== See also ==
- List of rivers of South Dakota
