= No Flesh Creek =

River in South Dakota, U.S.

Coordinates: 43°25′42″N 102°09′47″W

No Flesh Creek (Lakota: Čhoníčha Waníča Wakpála) is a stream in the U.S. state of South Dakota.

Some say No Flesh Creek has the name of Chief No Flesh, a Sioux Indian, while others believe the creek was named after the Indians' starving horses.

== See also ==
- List of rivers of South Dakota
