= Jim Creek (Mill Creek tributary) =

Stream in the American state of Missouri

Coordinates: 39.667785°N 94.057719°W

Jim Creek is a stream in Caldwell County in the U.S. state of Missouri. It is a tributary of Mill Creek.

Jim Creek most likely was named after an early settler.

== See also ==
- List of rivers of Missouri
