= Spillman Creek =

Stream in Lincoln County, Kansas, U.S.

Coordinates: 39.0288958°N 98.2072765°W

Spillman Creek is a stream in Lincoln County, Kansas, in the United States.

Spillman Creek was named in the 1850s for a pioneer named Spillman.

== See also ==
- List of rivers of Kansas
