= Well Pole Creek =

Stream in South Dakota, U.S.

Coordinates: 43°41′41″N 103°36′09″W

Well Pole Creek is a stream in the U.S. state of South Dakota.

Well Pole Creek received its name from a well (complete with pole and rope) which stood near the creek.

== See also ==
- List of rivers of South Dakota
