= Grizzly Bear Creek (Alberta) =

Stream in Alberta, Canada

Coordinates: 53.08345°N 110.60162°W

Grizzly Bear Creek is a stream in Alberta, Canada.

Grizzly Bear Creek's name is an accurate preservation of its native Creek name, mist-a-ya.

== See also ==
- List of rivers of Alberta
