= Scabby Creek =

Stream in South Dakota, U.S.

Coordinates: 43°19′21″N 100°53′08″W

Scabby Creek is a stream in the U.S. state of South Dakota.

Scabby Creek received its name from an incident when Sioux Indians kept ponies inflicted with a skin disease.

== See also ==
- List of rivers of South Dakota
