= Slip-up Creek =

Coordinates: 43°36′00″N 96°39′17″W

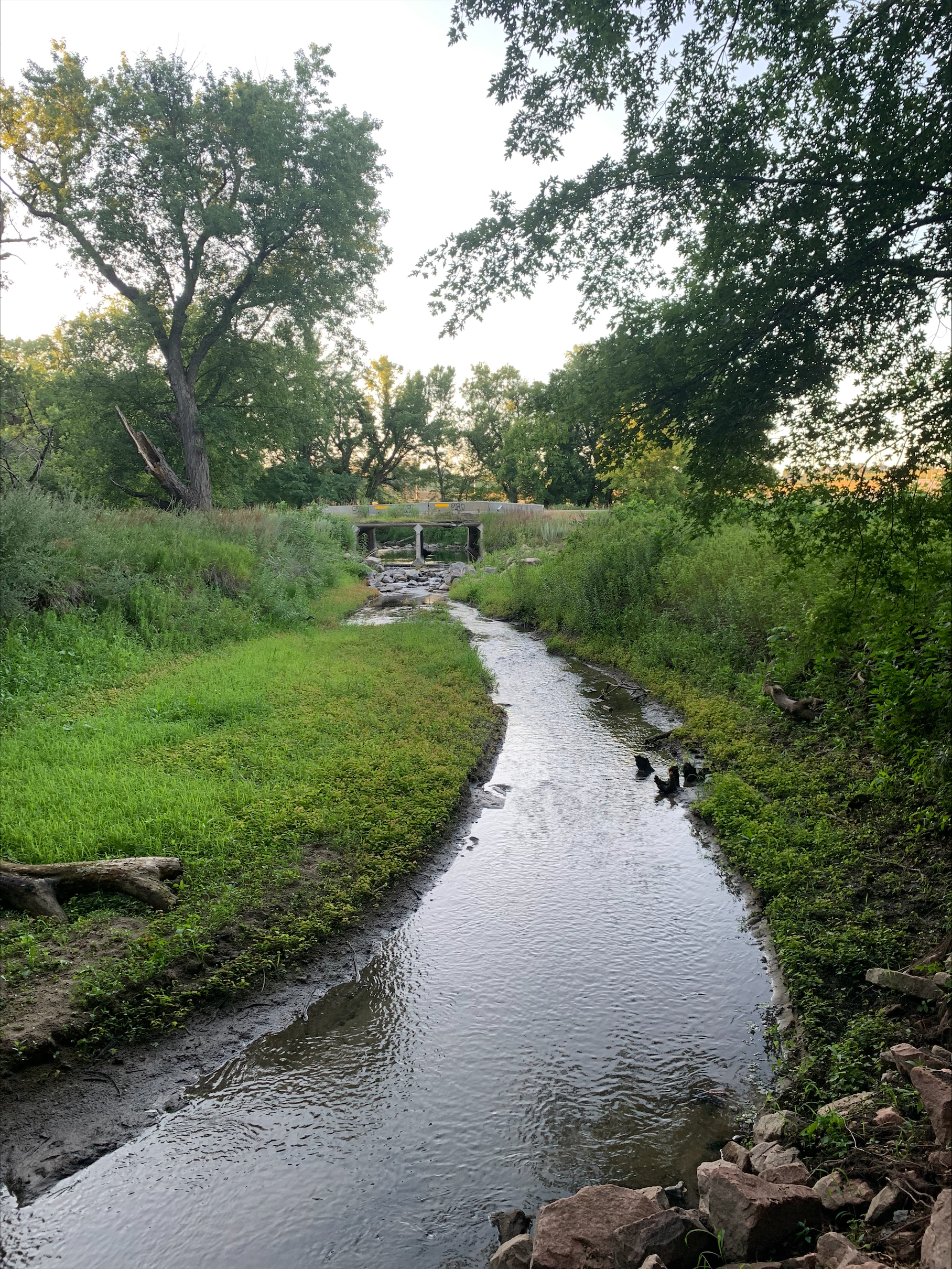
- Slip-up Creek just north of its confluence with the Big Sioux River

Location
- Country: United States
- State: South Dakota
- County: Minnehaha County, South Dakota

Slip-up Creek is a stream in the U.S. state of South Dakota. It is a tributary of the Big Sioux River.

According to tradition, the creek was named when a pioneer farmer's tractor "slipped up" while crossing the stream.

== See also ==
- List of rivers of South Dakota
