= Beaver Trap Creek =

Stream in South Dakota, United States

Coordinates: 45°13′52″N 101°41′52″W

Beaver Trap Creek is a stream in the U.S. state of South Dakota.

Some say the creek was named for the fact it was a favorite hunting ground of beavers by Indians, while others believe the creek was named for the abandoned beaver trap which was found there.

== See also ==
- List of rivers of South Dakota
