= Heely Creek =

River in the United States of America

Coordinates: 43°59′10″N 103°50′02″W

Heely Creek is a stream in the U.S. state of South Dakota.

Heely Creek has the name of Frank Heely, a local cattleman.

== See also ==
- List of rivers of South Dakota
