= Bates Creek =

Stream in Missouri, U.S.

Bates Creek is a stream in Washington County in the U.S. state of Missouri. It is a tributary of Mine a Breton Creek.

The stream headwaters are at 37°52′59″N 90°50′27″W and its confluence with Mine a Breton Creek is at 37°56′50″N 90°47′54″W. Bates Creek source area lies south of Potosi, and flows north passing west of Potosi before turning northeast and passing under Missouri routes 8 and 185 just before joining the Mine a Breton just northwest of the city.

Bates Creek has the name of Moses Bates, proprietor of a local blast furnace.

== See also ==
- List of rivers of Missouri
