= Stove Creek =

Stream in South Dakota, United States

Coordinates: 45°02′35″N 100°28′52″W

Stove Creek is a stream in the U.S. state of South Dakota. It is a right-bank tributary of the Missouri River, draining into Lake Oahe.

Stove Creek was named the fact stoves were stored near its mouth for shipment until the roads were passable.

== See also ==
- List of rivers of South Dakota
