= Mail Shack Creek =

Stream in South Dakota, U.S.

Coordinates: 44°38′48″N 100°37′13″W

Mail Shack Creek is a stream in the U.S. state of South Dakota. Much of the original course of the stream was submerged by the creation of Lake Oahe in the 1960s. It is a left-bank tributary of the Missouri River.

Mail Shack Creek was named for a shelter which stood there which was used by the mail delivery man.

== See also ==
- List of rivers of South Dakota
