= Armells Creek (Yellowstone River tributary) =

Stream in Rosebud County, Montana, U.S.

Coordinates: 46°16′20″N 106°48′05″W

Armells Creek is a stream in Rosebud County, in the U.S. state of Montana. It is a tributary of the Yellowstone River.

== See also ==
- List of rivers of Montana
