= Dry House Creek =

Stream in South Dakota, United States

Coordinates: 45°46′44″N 103°52′35″W

Dry House Creek is a stream in the U.S. state of South Dakota.

Dry House Creek was named for the fact buffalo meat was dried near it in a dryhouse.

== See also ==
- List of rivers of South Dakota
