= American Creek (South Dakota) =

Stream in Bruele County, South Dakota, U.S.

Coordinates: 43°48′56″N 99°19′54″W

American Creek (also known as Crow Creek) is a stream in northwestern Bruele County, South Dakota, United States, that is a tributary of the Lake Francis Case reservoir on the Missouri River. The creek's headwaters are just east of the town of Pukwana and its mouth is in the city of Chamberlain. In addition to the two communities, the creek flows through the Pukwana and Chamberlain townships.

Lake Wanalain is a reservoir along the creek in the western part of Pukwana Township that is created by the Wanalain Lake Dam.

American Creek received its name directly from Lewis and Clark.

== See also ==
- List of rivers of South Dakota
