= Foot Creek =

Stream in South Dakota, U.S.

Coordinates: 45°25′35″N 98°28′43″W

Foot Creek is a stream in the U.S. state of South Dakota. It's flow begins near Leola South Dakota, flowing mostly south and somewhat east, meeting dams Bill Welk and Richmond dam, the later which forms Richmond Lake. The stream continues until it flows into Moccasin Creek on the south side of Aberdeen's border.

According to the Federal Writers' Project, Foot Creek derives its name from an obscure settler named Foote.

== See also ==
- List of rivers of South Dakota
