= Beicegel Creek =

Stream in North Dakota, U.S.

Coordinates: 47.463934°N 103.630076°W

Beicegel Creek is a stream in North Dakota, in the United States. It flows into Little Missouri River.

Beicegel Creek derives its name from the Beisigl brothers, local cattlemen.

== See also ==
- List of rivers of North Dakota
