= Castle Creek (South Dakota) =

Stream in South Dakota, United States

Coordinates: 44.08640°N 103.61940°W

Castle Creek is a tributary of Rapid Creek, approximately 14 mi (23 km) long, in western South Dakota in the United States.

It rises out of Deerfield Reservoir, in the Black Hills in Pennington County approximately 15 mi (24 km) NNW of Custer. It flows north and east, joining Rapid Creek approximately 4 mi (6.4 km) west of Silver City.

Castle Creek received its name on account of castle-like rock formations of the nearby canyon.

== See also ==
- List of rivers of South Dakota
