= Elm River (North Dakota–South Dakota) =

Stream in the United States

Coordinates: 45°36′12″N 98°18′29″W

Elm River is a stream in the U.S. states of North Dakota and South Dakota.

Elm River was named for the groves of elm trees situated along its course.

== See also ==
- List of rivers of North Dakota
- List of rivers of South Dakota
