= Plains Creek =

Stream in South Dakota, U.S.

Coordinates: 43°06′31″N 103°39′20″W

Plains Creek is a stream in the U.S. state of South Dakota.

Plains Creek was named for the plain terrain along its course.

== See also ==
- List of rivers of South Dakota
