= Mexican Creek =

River in South Dakota, U.S.

Coordinates: 44°02′49″N 101°42′24″W

Mexican Creek is a stream in the U.S. state of South Dakota.

Mexican Creek has the name of "Mexican Ed" Sanchez, a local cattleman.

== See also ==
- List of rivers of South Dakota
