= Moccasin Creek (Wisconsin) =

Stream in Wisconsin, U.S.

Coordinates: 44°19′58″N 89°53′21″W

Moccasin Creek is a stream in the U.S. state of Wisconsin. It is a tributary to the Wisconsin River.

According to one tradition, the creek was named for its moccasin-shaped outline, while another tradition states water moccasins in its waters account for the name. In the Menominee language, the creek is known as Mahkāēsen-Sipiahsēhsaeh, "moccasin creek".
