= Gimlet Creek (South Dakota) =

Stream in South Dakota, U.S.

Coordinates: 44°06′38″N 103°38′44″W

Gimlet Creek is a stream in the U.S. state of South Dakota.

Gimlet Creek was so named on account of its irregular watercourse ("crooked as a gimlet").

== See also ==
- List of rivers of South Dakota
