= Sidney Creek =

Stream in South Dakota, U.S.

Coordinates: 43°45′00″N 103°34′33″W

Sidney Creek is a stream in the U.S. state of South Dakota.

Sidney Creek derives its name from the Sidney-Black Hills Trail.

== See also ==
- List of rivers of South Dakota
