= Cottle Creek =

Stream in South Dakota, United States

Coordinates: 44°28′07″N 103°20′58″W

Cottle Creek is a stream in the U.S. state of South Dakota.

Cottle Creek has the name of Frank Cottle, a pioneer merchant.

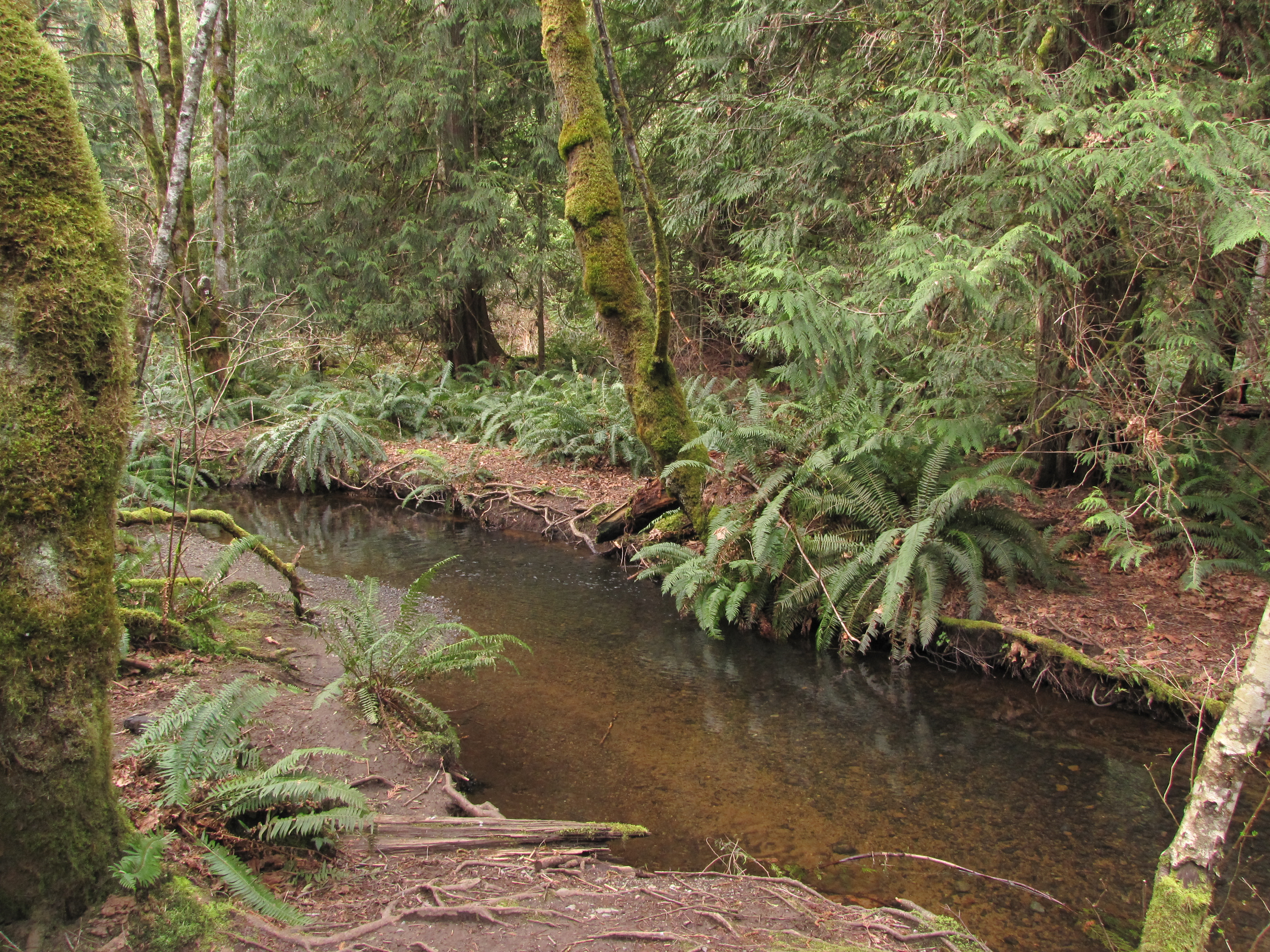
Cottle Creek ferns

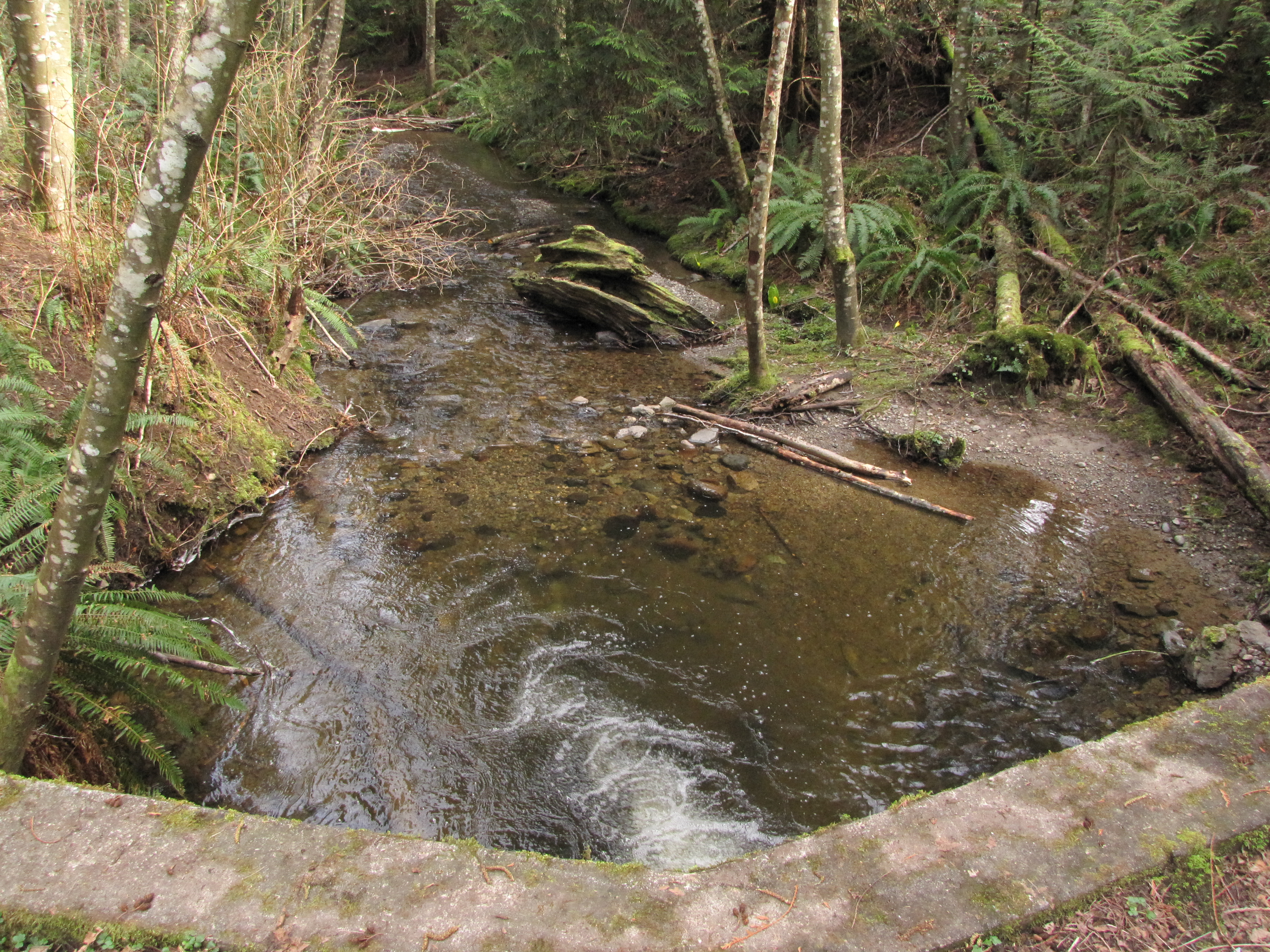
Cottle Creek culvert

== See also ==
- List of rivers of South Dakota
