= Hump Creek (Haakon County, South Dakota) =

Stream in South Dakota, U.S.

Coordinates: 44°29′55″N 101°32′14″W

Hump Creek is a stream in the U.S. state of South Dakota.

Hump Creek has the name of Chief Hump, a Sioux Indian who settled there.

== See also ==
- List of rivers of South Dakota
