= Arrow Creek (Fergus County, Montana) =

River in the United States of America

Location
- Country: Fergus, Chouteau and Judith Basin County, Montana

Physical characteristics
- Source
  - coordinates: 47°24′03″N 110°36′20″W
- Mouth
  - coordinates: 47°42′52″N 109°49′43″W
  - elevation: 2,431 feet (741 m)

Basin features
- River system: Missouri River

Arrow Creek (Gros Ventre: ʔɔ́ciníícááh, lit. 'arrow river') is a tributary of the Missouri River in Montana in the United States. Approximately 45 miles (73 km) long, it rises in the Lewis and Clark National Forest near Highwood Baldy in the Highwood Mountains in southern Chouteau County. It flows south then east, then northeast and joins the Missouri in the White Cliffs Area on the border between Chouteau and Fergus counties.

== See also ==
- List of rivers of Montana
- Montana Stream Access Law
