= Tall Prairie Chicken Creek =

River in South Dakota, United States

Coordinates: 44°51′34″N 100°41′22″W

Tall Prairie Chicken Creek is a tributary of the Missouri River, located in Dewey County, South Dakota, United States, in the Cheyenne River Indian Reservation.

Tall Prairie Chicken Creek has the name of Tall Prairie Chicken, a member of the Sioux tribe. The name possibly refers to a Miniconjou man named Xiyo-hanska (Tall Prairie Chicken) who signed the Agreement of 1877, a treaty which ceded Sioux territory to the U.S. government after the Great Sioux War of 1876.

== See also ==
- List of rivers of South Dakota
