= Crazy Hole Creek =

Stream in South Dakota, U.S.

Coordinates: 43°10′27″N 100°15′21″W

Crazy Hole Creek is a stream in the U.S. state of South Dakota.

According to the Federal Writers' Project, the origin of the name of Crazy Hole Creek is obscure.

== See also ==
- List of rivers of South Dakota
