= Vanocker Creek =

Stream in South Dakota, U.S.

Coordinates: 44°24′58″N 103°30′08″W

Vanocker Creek is a stream in the U.S. state of South Dakota. It is a right-bank tributary of the Bear Butte Creek, joining at the city of Sturgis.

Vanocker Creek has the name of Frank Vanocker, an early settler.

== See also ==
- List of rivers of South Dakota
