= Snatch Creek =

Stream in South Dakota, U.S.

Coordinates: 42.88480°N 97.80200°W

Snatch Creek is a stream in the U.S. state of South Dakota. It is a left-bank tributary of the Missouri River, draining into Lewis and Clark Lake.

Some say the creek received its name from an incident when a person was "snatched" out of the swollen creek, while others believe Indian women "snatched" out fish from the creek during low water.

== See also ==
- List of rivers of South Dakota
