= Dirty Womans Creek =

Stream in South Dakota, United States

Coordinates: 44°07′32″N 101°55′45″W

Dirty Womans Creek is a stream in the U.S. state of South Dakota.

Some say Dirty Womans Creek was named for a dirty female cook, while others believe the creek's name refers to a dirty Indian woman who settled there.

== See also ==
- List of rivers of South Dakota
