= Big Prairie Dog Creek =

Stream in South Dakota, U.S.

Coordinates: 44°07′09″N 100°56′27″W

Big Prairie Dog Creek is a stream in the U.S. state of South Dakota.

Big Prairie Dog Creek was named after the prairie dog native to the area.

== See also ==
- List of rivers of South Dakota
