= Vermillion River (South Dakota) =

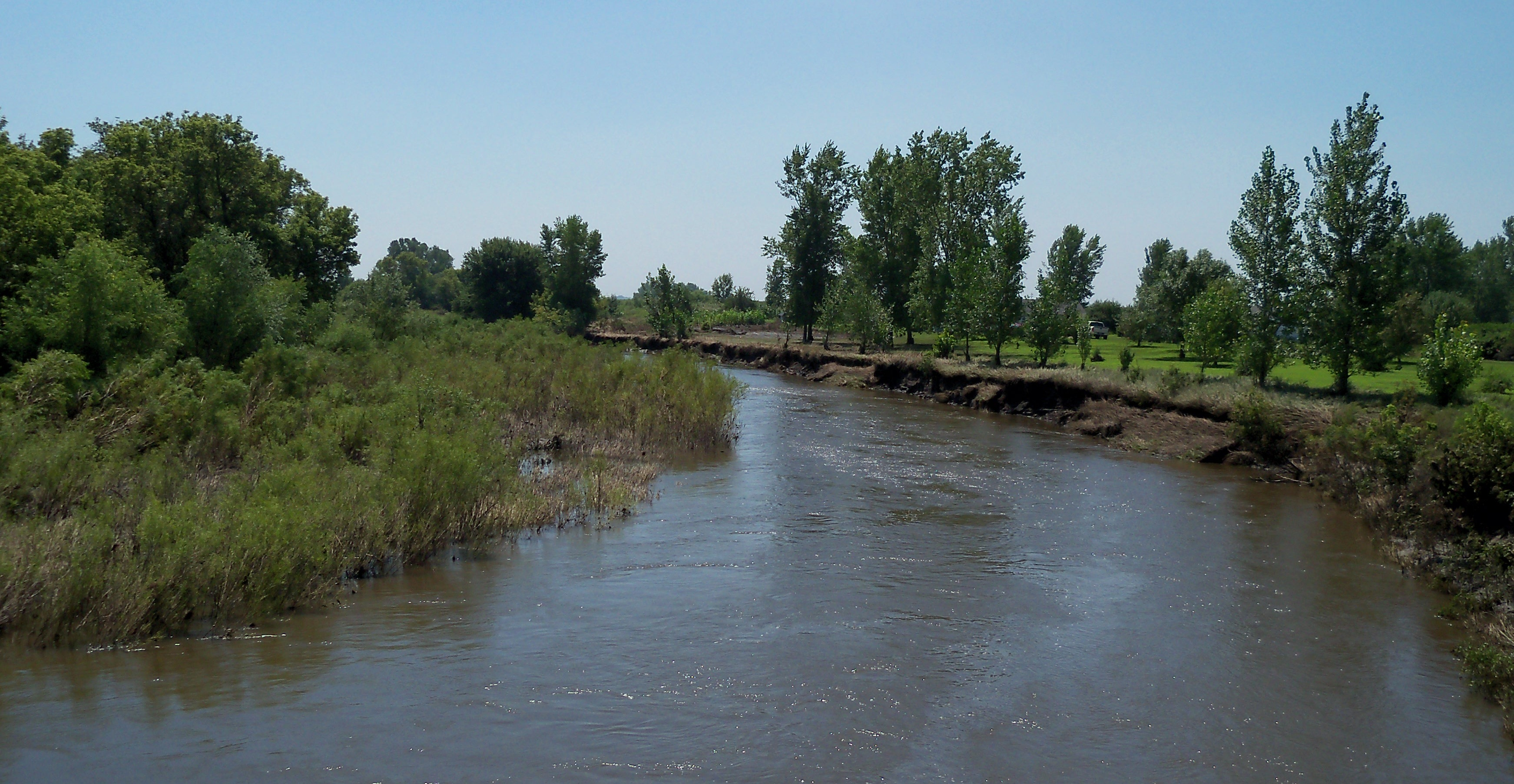
- Vermillion River between Parker and Chancellor

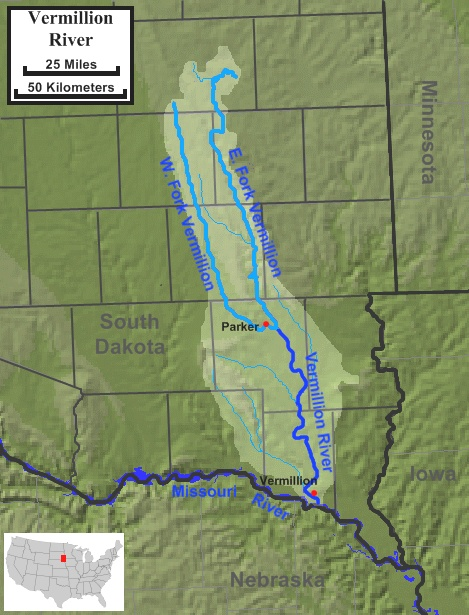
- The course and watershed of the Vermillion River.
- Native name: Waséoyuze Wakpá (Lakota)

Location
- Country: United States
- State: South Dakota
- Cities: Vermillion, SD, Centerville, SD

Physical characteristics
- Source: Confluence of the East Fork Vermillion River and West Fork Vermillion River
  - location: Parker Township in Turner County, near Parker, South Dakota
  - coordinates: 43.394083°N 97.069006°W
- Mouth: Missouri River
  - location: Fairview Township in Clay County, near Vermillion, South Dakota
  - coordinates: 42.733007°N 96.890335°W
- Length: 96 mi (154 km)
- Basin size: 2,180 sq mi (5,600 km^{2})
- Discharge
  - location: Vermillion
  - average: 440 cu ft/s (12 m^{3}/s)

The Vermillion River is a tributary of the Missouri River, 96 miles (154 km) long, in eastern South Dakota in the United States. The origin of the river name is Waséoyuze, Lakota for "place where vermilion is obtained".

It is formed by the confluence of the East Fork Vermillion River and West Fork Vermillion River. The East Fork, approximately 103 miles (166 km) long, rises in Lake Whitewood in Kingsbury County on the Coteau des Prairies. The West Fork, approximately 108 miles (174 km) long, rises in Miner County. Both forks flow south, roughly parallel, joining east of Parker. The combined river flows south and joins the Missouri east of the James River Highlands and 5 miles (8 km) south of Vermillion. Its tributaries include White Stone Creek and Baptist Creek. The Vermillion River drains about 2,180 square miles (5,600 km^{2}) of the southwestern edge of the Coteau des Prairies. Approximately once per 3.5 years, the Vermillion runs dry.

The Vermillion is a north-south river situated between the Big Sioux River and James River.

== See also ==
- List of rivers of South Dakota
- List of tributaries of the Missouri River
- James River
- Big Sioux River
- Siouxland
