= Victoria Creek =

Stream in South Dakota, U.S.

Coordinates: 44°02′51″N 103°20′42″W

Location
- Country: United States
- State: South Dakota
- County: Pennington

Physical characteristics
- Source
  - location: Black Hills, South Dakota

Victoria Creek is a stream in the U.S. state of South Dakota. It is located in the Black Hills, near Rapid City, which is north-northeast of the Mount Rushmore National Memorial.

Some say the creek took the name of a local mining company, while others believe the creek has the name of Queen Victoria.

== See also ==
- List of rivers of South Dakota
