= Castalia Creek =

Stream in South Dakota, United States

Coordinates: 43°20′13″N 98°58′00″W

Castalia Creek is a stream in the U.S. state of South Dakota.

== History ==
Castalia Creek was indirectly named after Castalia, Iowa.

== See also ==
- List of rivers of South Dakota
