= Staadt Creek =

Stream in South Dakota, U.S.

Coordinates: 45°53′25″N 103°31′48″W

Staadt Creek is a stream in the U.S. state of South Dakota.

Staadt Creek has the name of George Staadt, a pioneer hunter.

== See also ==
- List of rivers of South Dakota
