= Spotted Bear Creek =

Stream in South Dakota, U.S.

Coordinates: 44°32′14″N 101°46′39″W

Spotted Bear Creek is a stream in the U.S. state of South Dakota.

Spotted Bear Creek has the name of a local member of the Sioux tribe.

== See also ==
- List of rivers of South Dakota
