= Holt Creek (Wisconsin) =

Stream in Wisconsin, United States

Coordinates: 44°40′54″N 89°15′53″W

Holt Creek is a stream in the U.S. state of Wisconsin. It is a tributary to the Little Wolf River. It is unknown why the name "Holt Creek" was applied to this stream.
