= Pleasant Valley Creek =

Stream in South Dakota, U.S.

Coordinates: 43°33′08″N 103°43′20″W

Pleasant Valley Creek is a stream in the U.S. state of South Dakota. It is a tributary of Red Canyon Creek and is shown on mapping as being seasonally dry.

Pleasant Valley Creek has the commendatory name of the valley which contains its watercourse.

== See also ==
- List of rivers of South Dakota
- List of rivers of the United States
