= Buskala Creek =

Stream in South Dakota, United States

Coordinates: 44°11′54″N 103°45′46″W

Buskala Creek is a stream in the U.S. state of South Dakota.

Buskala is a name derived from the Sioux language meaning "white logs".

== See also ==
- List of rivers of South Dakota
