= Hawkwright Creek =

Stream in South Dakota, United States

Coordinates: 43°27′30″N 103°46′34″W

Hawkwright Creek is a stream in the U.S. state of South Dakota.

Hawkwright Creek has the name of J. N. "Hawk" Wright, a local cattleman.

== See also ==
- List of rivers of South Dakota
