= Peggy Creek =

Stream in South Dakota, U.S.

Coordinates: 45°24′25″N 102°44′24″W

Peggy Creek is a stream in the U.S. state of South Dakota.

Peggy Creek has the name of a horse which roamed the area.

== See also ==
- List of rivers of South Dakota
