= Glen Erin Creek =

Stream in South Dakota, U.S.

Coordinates: 43°44′22″N 103°31′07″W

Glen Erin Creek is a stream in the U.S. state of South Dakota.

Glen Erin Creek derives its name from Erin, or Ireland, the native land of a first settler.

== See also ==
- List of rivers of South Dakota
