= Laughing Water Creek =

Stream in South Dakota

Coordinates: 43°48′33″N 103°37′32″W

Laughing Water Creek is a stream in the U.S. state of South Dakota.

Laughing Water Creek's name comes from the Sioux Indians of the area.

== See also ==
- List of rivers of South Dakota
