= Holt Creek (Keya Paha River tributary) =

Stream in Nebraska and South Dakota, U.S.

Coordinates: 43°00′46″N 99°42′24″W

Holt Creek is a stream in the U.S. states of Nebraska and South Dakota. It is a tributary to the Keya Paha River.

Holt Creek has the name of a local horse thief.

== See also ==
- List of rivers of Nebraska
- List of rivers of South Dakota
