= Lodgepole Creek (South Dakota) =

Stream in South Dakota, U.S.

Coordinates: 45°42′52″N 102°17′12″W

Lodgepole Creek is a stream in the U.S. state of South Dakota.

The creek took its name from nearby Lodgepole Butte, where lodgepole pine grew.
