= Grizzly Bear Creek (South Dakota) =

Stream in South Dakota, U.S.

Coordinates: 43°53′36″N 103°25′31″W

Grizzly Bear Creek is a stream in the U.S. state of South Dakota.

Grizzly bears once roamed the area, hence the name.

== See also ==
- List of rivers of South Dakota
