= Bear Butte Creek =

River in South Dakota, United States

Coordinates: 44°30′29″N 103°08′27″W

Bear Butte Creek is a stream in the U.S. state of South Dakota.

The creek takes its name from Bear Butte.

== See also ==
- List of rivers of South Dakota
- Vanocker Creek, tributary
