= Little White River (South Dakota) =

Coordinates: 43.72780°N 100.66100°W

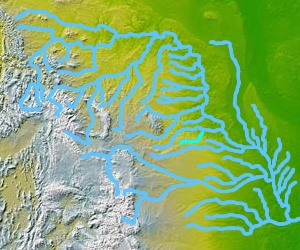
The Little White River shown in the Missouri River watershed

The Little White River (Lakota: Makhízita Čík'ala; formerly known as the South Fork of the White River) is a tributary of the White River, approximately 234 miles (377 km) long, in south central South Dakota in the United States.

It rises on the Pine Ridge Indian Reservation in southeastern Oglala Lakota County. It flows east past Martin and north of Lacreek National Wildlife Refuge. It flows into the Rosebud Indian Reservation and turns northeast, passing north of Rosebud and west of the town of White River. It joins the White approximately 12 mi (19 km) SSE of Murdo. At White River, the stream measures approximately 150 cubic feet per second (4.2 cubic metres per second).

== See also ==
- List of rivers of South Dakota
