= Cheyenne River =

River in South Dakota and Wyoming, US

Cheyenne River Lakota: Wakpá Wašté; "Good River"
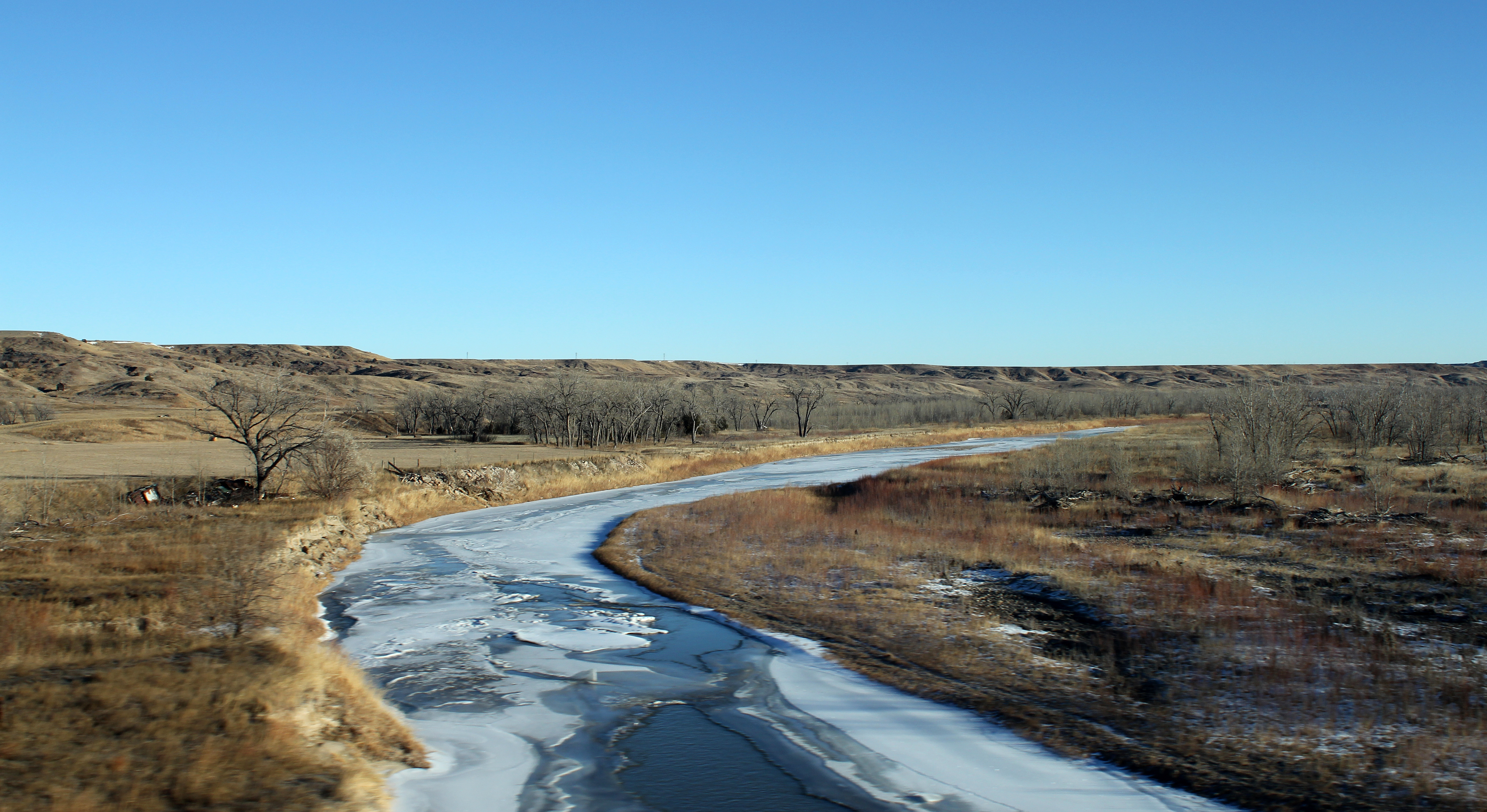
- Cheyenne River at the I-90 bridge crossing, near Wasta in Pennington County.

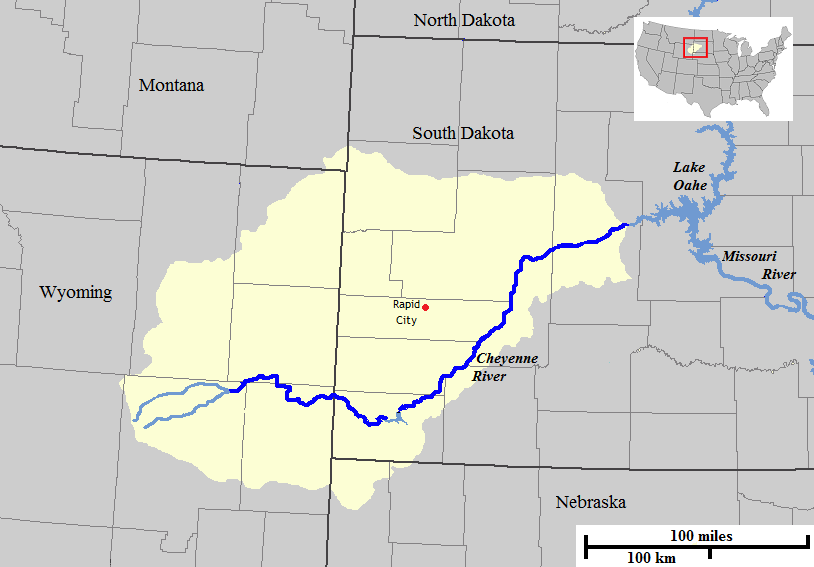
- Cheyenne River course and watershed.
- Etymology: Cheyenne Native American Tribe

Location
- Country: United States
- State: Wyoming, South Dakota

Physical characteristics
- Source: Thunder Basin National Grassland
  - location: Converse County, Wyoming
  - coordinates: 43.425928°N 105.058426°W
- Mouth: Lake Oahe / Missouri River
  - location: Ziebach County / Haakon County / Pennington County, South Dakota
  - coordinates: 44.723965°N 101.166749°W
- Length: 295 mi (475 km)
- Basin size: 24,240 sq mi (62,800 km^{2})
- Discharge
  - location: Eagle Butte
  - average: 874 cu ft/s (24.7 m^{3}/s)

The Cheyenne River (Lakota: Wakpá Wašté; "Good River"), also written Chyone, referring to the Cheyenne people who once lived there, is a tributary of the Missouri River in the U.S. states of Wyoming and South Dakota. It is approximately 295 miles (475 km) long and drains an area of 24,240 square miles (62,800 km^{2}). About 60% of the drainage basin is in South Dakota and almost all of the remainder is in Wyoming.

== Course ==
Formed by the confluence of Antelope Creek and Dry Fork Creek in Wyoming, it rises in northeastern Wyoming in the Thunder Basin National Grassland in Converse County. It flows east into South Dakota, passes Edgemont, and skirts the southern end of the Black Hills, passing through Angostura Reservoir. On the east side of the Black Hills, it flows northeast, past Oral, the Buffalo Gap National Grassland, and along the northwestern boundary of the Pine Ridge Indian Reservation and Badlands National Park. It is joined by Rapid Creek, passes Wasta and is joined by the Belle Fourche River in eastern Meade County, after which it flows ENE along the southern boundary of the Cheyenne River Indian Reservation. Near the town of Cherry Creek, it is joined by Cherry Creek and flows into Missouri at Lake Oahe, approximately 32 mi (50 km) NNW of Pierre, South Dakota, with the lower 35 mi (56 km) of the river forming an arm of Lake Oahe.

The Belle Fourche River is the largest tributary of the Cheyenne. Rapid, Sulphur, Plum, Cherry, and Owl Creeks are important other tributaries of the Belle Fourche-Cheyenne. Snowmelt from the Black Hills provides the major source of river water. Because of the proximity to the Black Hills and its mining industry, the Cheyenne historically picked up large quantities of zinc, arsenic, and cyanide. Those pollutants are no longer a major threat due to water quality regulations. The Cheyenne River is still higher in dissolved mineral content than any other South Dakota major river.

== Cheyenne Watershed ==
The Cheyenne watershed is part of the Missouri River watershed and spans the Mountain West and Great Plains states of northeastern Wyoming, southwestern and south central South Dakota, as well as small areas of northwestern Nebraska, and southeastern Montana. As of 2001, the Cheyenne watershed was primarily grassland (62.8%), followed by shrubland (16.3%) and forest cover (11.9%). The primary population centers include Rapid City, South Dakota and Gillette, Wyoming.

With a population of nearly 4.5 million in these states, water use was an average of 5,254 million US gallons per day (19,890 million litres per day) in 2010. This amounts to approximately 1,170 US gallons (4,400 L) per person per day. A total of 1,855 thousand acre-feet (604 billion US gallons; 2,288 billion litres) are stored in 9 lakes and reservoirs in the Cheyenne watershed.

Sedimentation is a major water quality concern for the Cheyenne watershed, potentially resulting in reduced storage capacity for reservoirs. Major water issues in the Cheyenne, reflect those of the larger Missouri River basin and stem from anticipated effects from a warming climate.

== Industrial use ==
Demand for water from agriculture for irrigation, greater threats to viable habitat for endangered species and wildlife are large concerns directly related to increasing temperatures and evapotranspiration. Water companies are also concerned about "water delivery" in response to shifting runoff periods. Similarly, power companies are concerned about climate effects on hydropower generation.

As of November 2019, TC Energy was applying for permits in the state to tap the Cheyenne River to use water for the construction of Phase 4 of the Keystone pipeline, including camp construction to house transient construction workers.

== See also ==
- List of rivers of South Dakota
- List of rivers of Wyoming
