= List of rivers of South Dakota =

This is a list of rivers in the state of South Dakota in the United States.

== By tributary ==
=== Minnesota River watershed ===
- Little Minnesota River
  - Jorgenson River
- Whetstone River
- North Fork Yellow Bank River
- South Fork Yellow Bank River
- West Branch Lac qui Parle River

=== Missouri River ===
- Little Missouri River
  - Gallup Creek
  - Dry House Creek
- Grand River
  - Black Horse Butte Creek
  - Cedar Boy Creek
  - Cottonwood Creek
  - Cottonwood Creek
  - Cyclone Creek
  - Dirt Lodge Creek
    - Little Soldier Creek
  - Firesteel Creek
  - Flat Creek
    - East Flat Creek
  - High Bank Creek
  - Hump Creek
  - Lodgepole Creek
  - Louse Creek
  - Meadow Creek
  - North Fork Grand River
    - Billy Young Creek
    - Buffalo Creek
    - Crooked Creek
      - Trunk Creek
      - Staadt Creek
      - Petes Creek
    - Deer Creek
    - Horse Creek
    - Lone Tree Creek
    - Slick Creek
  - Plum Creek
    - West Plum Creek
      - Hump Creek
  - Rock Creek
  - Soldier Creek
  - Stink Creek
    - Iron Dog Creek
  - South Fork Grand River
    - Bar H Creek
    - Bog Creek
    - Box Spring Creek
    - Brush Creek
    - Bull Creek
    - Butcher Creek
    - Clarks Fork Creek
      - Sioux Creek
        - Atterbury Creek
    - Coal Creek
    - Defenball Creek
    - Duck Creek
    - Eggland Creek
    - Fisher Creek
    - Graves Creek
    - Hay Creek
    - Horse Creek
    - Jerry Creek
    - Jones Creek
    - Little Grand River
    - Little Nasty Creek
    - Middle Creek
    - Olson Creek
    - Pine Spring Creek
    - Prairie Dog Creek
    - Rush Creek
    - Sand Creek
    - Sheep Creek
    - Slick Creek
    - Skull Creek
    - Snake Creek
    - Timber Draw Creek
    - White Hill Creek
  - Thunder Hawk Creek
    - East Thunder Hawk Creek
  - White Shirt Creek
- Moreau River
  - Little Moreau River
  - Thunder Butte Creek
    - Beaver Trap Creek
  - Flint Rock Creek
  - Rabbit Creek
    - Peggy Creek
  - North Fork Moreau River
  - South Fork Moreau River
- Tall Prairie Chicken Creek
- Cheyenne River
  - Fishgut Creek
  - Rudy Creek
  - Straighthead Creek
  - Spotted Bear Creek
  - Rapid Creek
    - Victoria Creek
    - Castle Creek
      - South Fork Castle Creek
        - Heely Creek
    - East Gimlet Creek
      - Gimlet Creek
    - North Fork Rapid Creek
      - Buskala Creek
  - Spring Creek
  - Battle Creek
    - Iron Creek
      - Toll Gate Creek
    - Grizzly Bear Creek
  - French Creek
    - Sidney Creek
    - Glen Erin Creek
    - Laughing Water Creek
  - Lame Johnny Creek
    - Flynn Creek
  - Beaver Creek
    - Well Pole Creek
  - Fall River
    - Hot Brook
  - Horsehead Creek
    - Lone Well Creek
  - Red Canyon Creek
    - Hawkwright Creek
      - Pleasant Valley Creek
  - Hat Creek
    - Plains Creek
  - Boxelder Creek
    - Bogus Jim Creek
  - Belle Fourche River
    - Bear Butte Creek
      - Cottle Creek
      - Vanocker Creek
    - Whitewood Creek
      - Whitetail Creek
        - Fantail Creek
    - Owl Creek
    - Redwater River
      - False Bottom Creek
        - Tetro Creek
      - Spearfish Creek
  - Cherry Creek
  - Moss Agate Creek
- Stove Creek
- Mail Shack Creek
- Bad River
  - Big Prairie Dog Creek
  - North Fork Bad River
    - Dirty Womans Creek
    - Mexican Creek
- Chapelle Creek
- Chaney Rush Creek
- American Creek
- White River
  - Medicine Root Creek
    - No Flesh Creek
  - Wounded Knee Creek
  - Bear-in-the-Lodge Creek
  - Little White River
    - Scabby Creek
  - Slim Butte Creek
- Platte Creek
  - Castalia Creek
  - Edgerton Creek
- Randall Creek
- Ponca Creek
- Niobrara River (Nebraska)
  - Keya Paha River
    - Crazy Hole Creek
    - Holt Creek
- Snatch Creek
- Marne Creek
- James River
  - Elm River
    - Maple River
  - Moccasin Creek
    - Foot Creek
- Vermillion River
  - Baptist Creek
  - Little Vermillion River
  - Spirit Mound Creek
- Big Sioux River
  - Indian River
  - Bullhead Run
  - Skunk Creek
  - Slip-up Creek
  - Split Rock Creek
    - Beaver Creek

=== Red River of the North watershed ===
- Bois de Sioux River

== Alphabetically ==
- American Creek
- Bad River
- Baptist Creek
- Belle Fourche River
- Big Sioux River
- Bois de Sioux River
- Buzzard Creek
- Castle Creek
- Cherry Creek
- Cheyenne River
- Elm River
- Fall River
- French Creek
- Grand River
- Indian River
- James River
- Jorgenson River
- Keya Paha River
- Lac qui Parle River, West Branch
- Laundreaux Creek
- Little Minnesota River
- Little Missouri River
- Little Moreau River
- Little Vermillion River
- Little White River
- Maple River
- McPherson Creek
- Minneconjou Creek
- Missouri River
- Mixes Food Creek
- Moreau River
- North Fork Grand River
- Owl Creek
- Ponca Creek
- Rapid Creek
- Redwater River
- Sidney Creek
- Skunk Creek
- South Fork Grand River
- Spearfish Creek
- Spirit Mound Creek
- Split Rock Creek
- Two Bit Creek
- Vermillion River
- Whetstone River
- White River
- Witcher Holes Creek
- Wounded Knee Creek
- Yellow Bank River, North Fork and South Fork

== See also ==
- List of rivers in the United States
