= National Register of Historic Places listings in Corson County, South Dakota =

Location of Corson County in South Dakota

This is a list of the National Register of Historic Places listings in Corson County, South Dakota.

This is intended to be a complete list of the properties on the National Register of Historic Places in Corson County, South Dakota, United States. The locations of National Register properties for which the latitude and longitude coordinates are included below, may be seen in a map.

There are 8 properties listed on the National Register in the county.

This National Park Service list is complete through NPS recent listings posted September 26, 2025.

== Current listings ==
	Name on the Register	Image	Date listed	Location	City or town	Description
1	Antelope Creek Stage Station	Antelope Creek Stage Station	June 18, 1992 (#92000692)	Address restricted	Morristown	
2	Archeological Site No. 39CO39	Archeological Site No. 39CO39	August 6, 1993 (#93000765)	Address restricted	Mahto	
3	Fort Manuel		December 2, 1977 (#77001240)	North of Kenel on the shores of Lake Oahe; 45°53′40″N 100°27′32″W	Kenel	
4	Grand River Stage Station	Grand River Stage Station	June 18, 1992 (#92000693)	Address restricted	Morristown	
5	Harding Schoolhouse		July 13, 1989 (#89000832)	5 miles west and 5.5 miles north of Trail City; 45°33′10″N 100°50′00″W	Trail City	Wood frame rural schoolhouse
6	Holy Spirit Chapel	Holy Spirit Chapel	July 7, 1995 (#95000817)	Southeast of the Highway 65 crossing of the Grand River, north of Firesteel; 45°37′37″N 101°17′32″W	Firesteel	
7	Sitting Bull Monument	Sitting Bull Monument	November 8, 2006 (#06001008)	SE 1/4 of SE 1/4 of Sec 13 T18 R29; 45°31′08″N 100°29′07″W	Mobridge	
8	South Dakota Dept. of Transportation Bridge No. 16-570-054		December 9, 1993 (#93001279)	Local road over Oak Creek; 45°52′13″N 100°49′52″W	McLaughlin	

== See also ==
- List of National Historic Landmarks in South Dakota
- National Register of Historic Places listings in South Dakota
