= South Dakota Highway 63 =

State highway in South Dakota, United States

Highway 63
- SD 63 highlighted in red

Route information
- Maintained by SDDOT
- Length: 167.455 mi (269.493 km)
- Tourist routes: Lewis and Clark Trail; Native American Scenic Byway

Southern segment
- Length: 20.826 mi (33.516 km)
- South end: US 18 near Parmelee
- North end: 246th Avenue south of Norris

Northern segment
- Length: 146.629 mi (235.977 km)
- South end: SD 44 south of Corn Creek
- Major intersections: I-90 from north of Belvidere to near Stamford; US 14 from west of Midland to west of Hayes; US 212 in North Eagle Butte; SD 20 from near Firesteel to west of Trail City; US 12 in McLaughlin
- North end: ND 6 at the North Dakota state line north of McLaughlin

Location
- Country: United States
- State: South Dakota
- Counties: Todd; Mellette; Jackson; Haakon; Stanley; Ziebach; Dewey; Corson

Highway system
- South Dakota State Trunk Highway System; Interstate; US; State
| ← SD 61 | → SD 65 |

South Dakota Highway 63 (SD 63) is a 167.455-mile (269.493 km) state highway in central South Dakota, United States, that connects U.S. Route 18 (US 18) south-southeast of Parmelee with the North Dakota state line north of McLaughlin.

It consists of two disconnected segments. The southern segment begins at US 18 south-southeast of Parmelee and proceeds 20.826 miles (33.516 km) to a rural intersection just south of Norris. The much-longer northern segment, which is 146.629 miles (235.977 km) long, begins at an intersection with SD 44 just south of Corn Creek and ends at the North Dakota state line north of McLaughlin, where the roadway continues as North Dakota Highway 6 (ND 6).

Portions of SD 63 north of US 14/SD 34 west of Hayes are part of the Lewis and Clark Trail. The segment of the highway, from US 14/SD 34 just west of Hayes, to US 212 west of Eagle Butte, is part of the Native American Scenic Byway.

The portion of the highway, from just north of the intersection with SD 44 to a point approximately 5 miles (8.0 km) south of Belvidere, is a gravel road.

== Route description ==
=== Southern segment ===
The southern segment of SD 63 begins at an intersection with U.S. Route 18 (US 18) south-southeast of Parmelee, in the northwestern part of both Todd County and the Rosebud Indian Reservation. After traveling westward through Parmelee, the highway crosses over Cut Meat Creek and then skirt along the northern edge of Eagle Feather Lake. It curves to the north-northeast and makes a stairstep pattern to the west before resuming a northward path. At an intersection with the appropriately-named County Line Road, the highway leaves Todd County and the Rosebud Indian Reservation and enters the southwestern part of Mellette County. SD 63 crosses over Gray Eagletail Creek and then curves to the west. Just south of Norris, it curves to the north and immediately meets its northern terminus, an intersection with the northern terminus of 246th Avenue.

=== Northern segment ===
==== Mellette County ====
SD 63 resumes approximately 7 miles (11 km) to the north, just south of Corn Creek, in the west-central portion of Mellette County, at an intersection with SD 44. At the northern end of Corn Creek, just south of an intersection with Wooden Knif Lane, the pavement ends, and the roadway becomes a gravel road. It curves to the north-northeast and crosses over Black Pipe Creek. The highway winds its way to the north and slightly bends more to the west. At a second crossing of Black Pipe Creek, it enters the northeastern part of both Jackson County and the Pine Ridge Indian Reservation. It also enters the Mountain Time Zone.

==== Jackson County ====
At a crossing of the White River, SD 63 leaves the Pine Ridge Indian Reservation. It curves to the north and enters Belvidere. At an intersection with D Street, the gravel road ends and the paved portion resumes. on the northern edge of Belvidere, it intersects the former path of SD 248. Then, it has an interchange with Interstate 90 (I-90). Here, I-90 and SD 63 travel concurrently to the east. Almost immediately, they cross over Brave Bull Creek. The eastbound lanes have a rest area before the roadway curves to the northeast. The westbound lanes then have a rest area before the highways split. SD 63 heads to the north-northwest and curves to the north, before resuming its north-northwest direction. SD 63 then enters the southeastern part of Haakon County.

==== Southern Haakon County ====
SD 63 continues to the north-northwest. It crosses over the Bad River and then crosses over some railroad tracks of the Rapid City, Pierre and Eastern Railroad before cutting across the southeastern part of Midland. Just after leaving the city limits of Midland, it intersects US 14. Here, it turns right and travels concurrently with US 14, while the roadway continues as 248th Avenue. Almost immediately, US 14/SD 63 re-enter Midland. The last intersection in Midland, the appropriately-named Midland Avenue, leads to the business district of the town. The concurrency curves to the north-northwest. After a curve to the north-northeast, they head to the north again. Then, they enter the southwestern part of Stanley County.

==== Stanley County ====
US 14/SD 63 travels due north and slide slightly to the east just before they split. They intersect SD 34 approximately 5 miles (8.0 km) west of Hayes. US 14 follows SD 34 east of this intersection, while SD 63 follows SD 34 west for about 1/2 mile (0.80 km). When SD 63 splits off, it travels due north to the northwestern part of the county. It then slides slightly to the west and resumes its northward trek. It curves to the west-northwest and re-enters Haakon County, this time in the northeastern part of the county.

==== Northern Haakon County ====
SD 63 curves to the west-southwest and crosses over Sage Creek. The highway curves to the north-northwest and crosses over Hermaphrodite Creek. The highway then crosses over the Cheyenne River. Here, it enters the southeastern part of Ziebach County and the south-central part of the Cheyenne River Indian Reservation.

==== Ziebach County ====
SD 63 crosses over Dupree Creek. It then curves to the northwest and then to the north. At an intersection with Airport Road, which leads to Cheyenne–Eagle Butte Airport, the highway enters Dewey County.

==== Dewey County ====
SD 63 begins to skirt along the western edge of North Eagle Butte. It intersects US 212 on the northwestern edge of the census-designated place (CDP). US 212 and SD 63 travel concurrently to the east, along the northern edge of the CDP. They enter the city limits of North Eagle Butte and pass some sewage disposal ponds. After leaving the city limits, they skirt along the southern edge of the CDP. When SD 63 splits off to the north, it skirts along the eastern edge of North Eagle Butte. It curves to the north-northwest and skirts along the eastern edge of Green Grass. It crosses over the Moreau River and curves back to the north. Approximately 3.2 miles (5.1 km) east-northeast of Firesteel, it intersects SD 20. The two highways travel concurrently in a due-east direction, while the roadway continue as County Road 3B (CR 3B). They curve to the east-northeast and cut through the northern part of Timber Lake. They curve to the north-northeast and north, before curving back to the east. SD 20/SD 63 then travel along the Dewey–Corson county line. SD 63 splits off from SD 20 about 4 miles (6.4 km) west of Trail City. It travels in a due-north direction and enters the southeastern part of both Corson County and the Standing Rock Indian Reservation.

==== Corson County ====
SD 63 curves to the north-northeast and crosses over the Grand River. It then curves to the north-northwest and skirts along the western edge of Little Eagle. It curves back to the north and then enters McLaughlin. There, it has an intersection with US 12. Immediately after this intersection is a crossing of some railroad tracks of BNSF Railway. The highway crosses over Oak Creek and continues to the north to the North Dakota state line. Here, SD 63 intersects 100th Street and reaches its northern terminus, while the roadway continues as North Dakota Highway 6 (ND 6).

== History ==
In the mid-1920s, a southern segment of SD 63 traveled from the Nebraska state line, south of Olsonville to Murdo. This changed in 1927, when SD 63 was truncated to end at US 14, and the former southern segment was renumbered SD 59. In the 1960s, extensions of SD 63 were implemented. Around 1960, SD 63 was extended south to US 16 near Stamford. By 1965, it was placed on a concurrency with SD 40 (now SD 44) south from Belvidere, ending west of Cedar Butte. By 1971, it was extended to US 18 near Parmlee, where it currently ends.

On the northern end of the highway, SD 63 originally did not exist north of Timber Lake (the original northern terminus of SD 63). Around 1944, another segment of SD 63 from McLaughlin to North Dakota was added, replacing SD 61. Between 1948 and 1953, the highway was realigned to begin approximately 3 miles (4.8 km) east of Firesteel. Between 1965 and 1971, the far northern segment was extended south from McLaughlin to SD 20, then west to connect with the other segment.

A resolution in the 2007 legislative session urged South Dakota Department of Transportation (SDDOT) to work to connect the two segments of the highway. Currently, the 6.9-mile-long (11.1 km) segment in between is a county road, which has over 400 vehicles per day travel on it.

== Major intersections ==
| County | Location | mi | km | Destinations | Notes |
|---|---|---|---|---|---|
| Todd | | 26.73 | 43.02 | US 18 – Pine Ridge, Martin | Southern terminus of southern segment |
| Mellette | Norris | 47.69 | 76.75 | 246th Avenue south | Northern terminus of southern segment |
| Mellette | Gap in route | | | | |
| Mellette | Corn Creek | 54.00 | 86.90 | SD 44 to SD 73 – White River | Southern terminus of northern segment |
| Jackson | Belvidere | 76.03 | 122.36 | SD 248 – Kadoka, Stamford | |
| Jackson | Belvidere | 76.32 | 122.83 | I-90 west – Kadoka | Southern end of I-90 concurrency; I-90 exit 163 |
| Jackson | | 83.48 | 134.35 | I-90 east – Murdo | Northern end of I-90 concurrency; I-90 exit 170 |
| Haakon | Midland | 96.93 | 155.99 | US 14 west / 248th Avenue north – Phillip | Southern end of US 14 concurrency; southern terminus of 248th Avenue |
| Stanley | | 118.62 | 190.90 | US 14 east / SD 34 east / Lewis and Clark Trail / Native American Scenic Byway – Pierre | Northern end of US 14 concurrency; eastern end of SD 34 concurrency |
| Stanley | | 119.12 | 191.71 | SD 34 west – Sturgis | Western end of SD 34 concurrency |
| Haakon | No major junctions | | | | |
| Ziebach | No major junctions | | | | |
| Dewey | North Eagle Butte | 116.54 | 187.55 | US 212 west – Dupree | Western end of US 212 concurrency |
| Dewey | | 173.67 | 279.49 | US 212 east / Native American Scenic Byway – Gettysburg | Eastern end of US 212 concurrency |
| Dewey | | 204.91 | 329.77 | SD 20 west – Isabel | Western end of SD 20 concurrency; roadway continues northward as CR 3B. |
| Dewey–Corson county line | | 227.58 | 366.25 | SD 20 east / Lewis and Clark Trail – Trail City | Eastern end of SD 20 concurrency |
| Corson | McLaughlin | 251.78 | 405.20 | US 12 – McIntosh, Mobridge | |
| Corson | | 260.64 | 419.46 | ND 6 north – Selfridge, Mandan | Continuation into North Dakota |
1.000 mi = 1.609 km; 1.000 km = 0.621 mi: Concurrency terminus

== See also ==
- List of state highways in South Dakota
