= Grand River (South Dakota) =

Stream in South Dakota, USA

Grand River Tributary to Missouri River
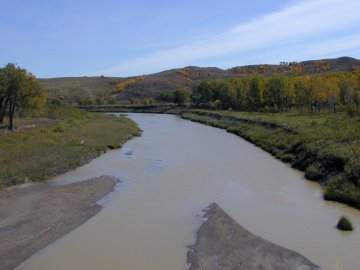
- The Grand River near Little Eagle

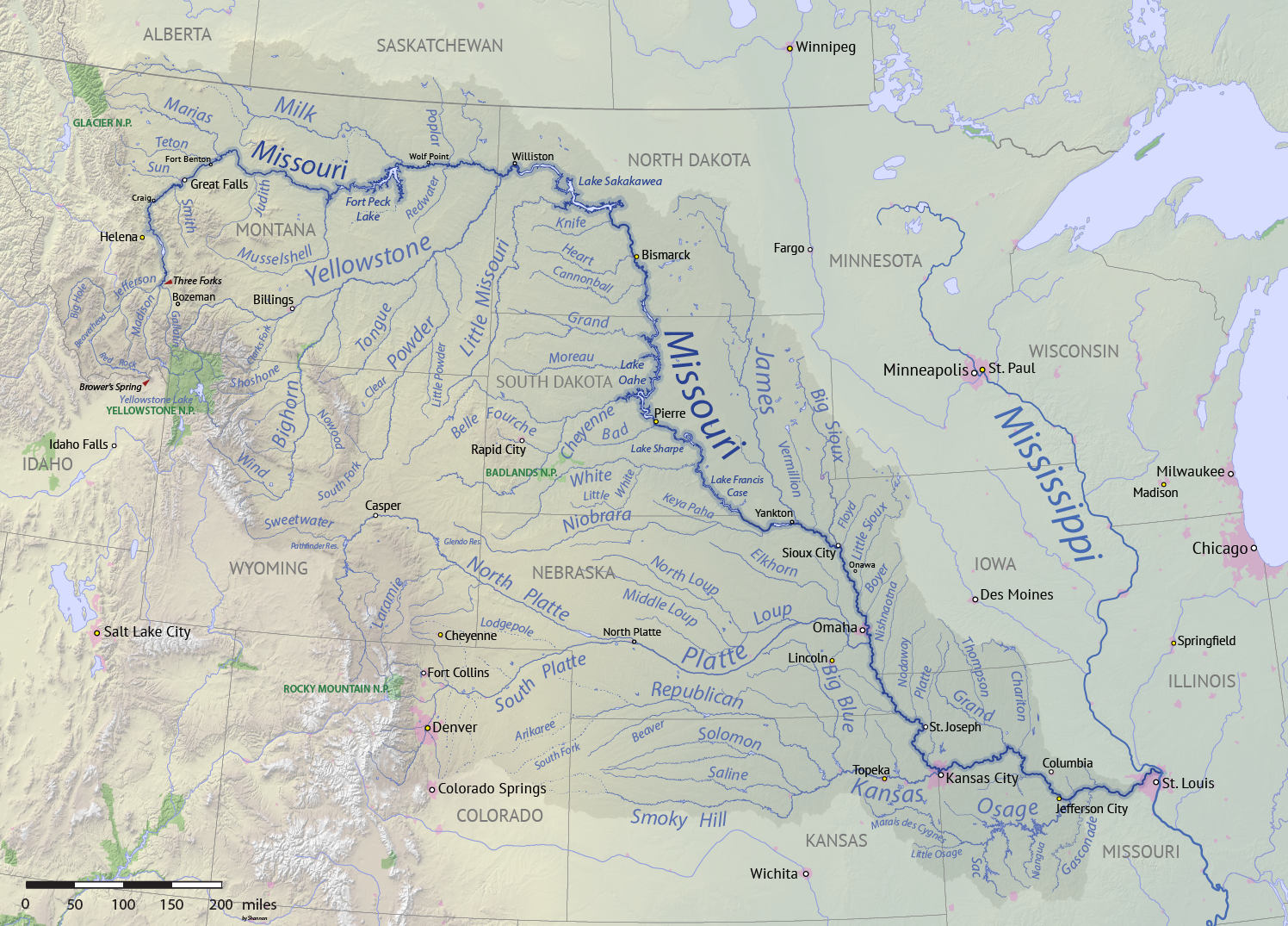
- The Grand River shown as a tributary of the Missouri River

- Location of Grand River mouth Grand River (South Dakota) (the United States)

Location
- Country: United States
- State: South Dakota
- Counties: Corson; Perkins

Physical characteristics
- Source: confluence of North Fork and South Fork Grand River
  - location: Shadehill Reservoir
  - coordinates: 45°45′9.93″N 102°11′55.56″W
  - elevation: 2,220 ft (680 m)
- Mouth: Missouri River
  - location: about 1-mile northwest of Mobridge, South Dakota
  - coordinates: 45°34′36.98″N 102°28′17.49″W
  - elevation: 1,608 ft (490 m)
- Length: 177.46 mi (285.59 km)
- Basin size: 5,590.47 square miles (14,479.3 km^{2})
- Discharge
  - location: Missouri River
  - average: 306.53 cu ft/s (8.680 m^{3}/s) at mouth with Missouri River

Basin features
- Progression: Missouri River → Mississippi River → Gulf of Mexico
- River system: Missouri River
- Tributaries
  - left: North Fork Grand River, Flat Creek, Dog Tooth Creek, Thunder Hawk Creek, Cyclone Creek, Deer Creek, Willow Creek, Cedar Boy Creek, Dirt Lodge Creek, Soldier Creek, Hump Creek, White Shirt Creek, Stink Creek, Rock Creek
  - right: South Fork Grand River, Black Horse Butte Creek, Meadow Creek, Cottonwood Creek, Louse Creek, Firesteel Creek, Plum Creek, High Bank Creek, Little Oak Creek, Deep Bank Creek, Snake Creek, Claymore Creek
- Bridges: Hugh Glass Road, SD 73, 116th Street, 209th Avenue, 215th Avenue, 119th Street, County Road, County Road, SD 65, unnamed road (x2), Brown Otter xing, CS 15, SD 63, US 12, SD 1806 (Singing Bridge)

The Grand River (Lakota: Čhaŋšúška Wakpá) is a tributary of the Missouri River in South Dakota in the United States. The length of the combined branch is 110 mi (177 km), with its longest fork, its length is approximately 200 mi (320 km).

== Variant names ==
According to the Geographic Names Information System, it has also been known historically as:

- Creek of the Rees
- Marapa River
- Palanat Palanata Wakpa Ree
- Ree River
- Riviere au Corn
- We tar hoo River

== Course ==
It is formed by the confluence of the North Fork (which rises in North Dakota) and the longer South Fork (which rises in South Dakota and passes through the town of Buffalo) in northwestern South Dakota near Shadehill in Perkins County, near several parcels of the Grand River National Grassland. Shadehill Reservoir is located at this confluence. It flows east, through the Standing Rock Sioux Reservation and joins the Missouri in Lake Oahe, approximately 2 mi (3 km) northwest of Mobridge. The lower 15 mi (24 km) of the river form an arm of the Lake Oahe reservoir. It is the northernmost of South Dakota's major West River streams: the Grand, Moreau, Cheyenne, Bad, and White. Draining about 5,200 square miles (13,000 km^{2}) of the northern plateaus of the state, the Grand receives most of its water from snowmelt. Water quality is high in sodium, and is therefore less appropriate for irrigation. At Wakpala, the river has a mean annual discharge of 275 cubic feet per second (8 m^{3}/s)

== History ==
In 1823, Henry Leavenworth fought the Arikara a few miles north of the mouth of the Grand River during the Arikara War.

Sitting Bull (1831–1890), a Hunkpapa Lakota holy man who led his people as a tribal chief, was born on the Grand River in or nearby Dakota Territory. Decades later, he was killed by Indian agency police on the Standing Rock Sioux Agency at his camp near the Grand River, as the police tried to arrest him.

The forks of the Grand was the site of a noted 1823 attack by a grizzly bear on frontiersman Hugh Glass, the inspiration for the 2015 film The Revenant.

== See also ==
- List of rivers of North Dakota
- List of rivers of South Dakota
