= Cyclone Creek =

Stream in South Dakota, U.S.

Coordinates: 45°43′42″N 101°56′50″W

Cyclone Creek is a tributary of the Grand River in Corson County, South Dakota. It is located within the Standing Rock Reservation.

Cyclone Creek was named after a cyclone incident in its area.

== See also ==
- List of rivers of South Dakota
