= Thunder Hawk Creek =

Stream in Corson and Perkins County, South Dakota, U.S.

Coordinates: 45°43′13″N 101°58′31″W

Thunder Hawk Creek is a stream in Corson and Perkins counties in the U.S. state of South Dakota. It is a tributary of the Grand River.

Thunder Hawk Creek has the name of a local Indian chief.

== See also ==
- List of rivers of South Dakota
