= Woman Walks Ahead =

2017 film directed by Susanna White

- Theatrical release poster
- Directed by: Susanna White
- Written by: Steven Knight
- Produced by: Edward Zwick; Marshall Herskovitz; Erika Olde; Rick Solomon; Andrea Calderwood
- Starring: Jessica Chastain; Michael Greyeyes; Chaske Spencer; Sam Rockwell
- Cinematography: Mike Eley
- Edited by: Lucia Zucchetti; Steven Rosenblum
- Music by: George Fenton
- Production companies: IM Global; Black Bicycle Entertainment; Bedford Falls Productions; Potboiler Productions
- Distributed by: A24; DirecTV Cinema
- Release dates: September 10, 2017 (TIFF); June 29, 2018 (United States)
- Running time: 102 minutes
- Countries: United States; United Kingdom
- Languages: English; Lakota
- Budget: $5 million
- Box office: $970,556

Woman Walks Ahead is a 2017 biographical drama Western film directed by Susanna White and written by Steven Knight. The film is the story of Catherine Weldon (a character inspired by Caroline Weldon; Jessica Chastain), a portrait painter who travels from New York City to the Dakotas in 1890 to paint a portrait of Sitting Bull (Michael Greyeyes). Chaske Spencer and Sam Rockwell also star.

The film premiered at the Toronto International Film Festival September 10, 2017. It was released through DirecTV Cinema on May 31, 2018, before being released in a limited release on June 29, 2018, by A24.

== Plot summary ==
Catherine Weldon narrates a letter to Sitting Bull which she sends to him via Indian Agent James McLaughlin at Fort Yates, North Dakota. Recently a widow, she decides to pursue her passion for painting, and wishes to make his portrait. Unbeknownst to her, the agent destroys her letter to Sitting Bull and orders her arrest upon arrival.

On the train, Army Colonel Groves asks what she is doing traveling alone and advises her to return home upon learning she is a painter. Left alone when they arrive, a passing Indian steals her trunk and painting supplies. She eventually makes it to Fort Yates, where she is confined to a cabin until the return train in the morning. Groves once again warns her that she is in danger, and that recent conflict between the Indians and the Army is not forgotten. He returns her possessions, having retrieved them from the thief (whom they killed).

The next morning, an Indian who works for the Indian Agency takes her to Sitting Bull, revealing he is his uncle. Sitting Bull agrees to be painted if Catherine pays him $1,000, and she stays the night on the reservation. A warrior enters her cabin, frightening her awake, and alerting Sitting Bull. He asks Sitting Bull to choose whether he is a warrior or a farmer, and he chooses farmer. Later on, she and Sitting Bull encounter Groves. He tells Catherine not to give the Indians hope, as the US will soon ratify a treaty taking more of the reservation land, and the arriving General Crook and the 7th Cavalry (of Little Bighorn fame) have not forgotten their battles with the Indians.

Sitting Bull initially arrives for his portrait in a common suit, but Catherine wishes him to wear traditional garb. He then takes her to an isolated teepee and changes into his buckskins. While painting him, he notices that Groves and his scout are watching them. When they return to the reservation that night, the village is empty. His nephew informs him that the Indians have seen a draft of the treaty, halving their rations and taking their land. Another warrior told them Sitting Bull left with a white woman, believing her a spy, and led the people to perform a Ghost Dance. That night, Catherine goes to watch the dance.

In order to help, Catherine purchases all of the food available in town for the reservation. While in town, she is assaulted by two townsmen for helping the Indians. Sitting Bull's nephew finds her and rushes her back to the reservation. After a short recovery, she appears (still injured) at a dinner with General Crook, Groves and McLaughlin, and informs them that she intends to help the Indians vote against their treaty.

Soon afterward, she begins campaigning with Sitting Bull to convince the others to vote against the treaty. At the vote at Fort Yates, Sitting Bull arrives, frightening into silence the chiefs Groves had bribed to give false testimony. Sitting Bull tells the commission they will vote against the treaty, and give up no more land. The Indians win in an overwhelming vote, but Groves tells Catherine that that was the plan - now the Army has a pretense to go to war.

Sitting Bull tells Catherine the spirits told him he would die in the coming winter. Some time later, she reveals her finished portrait before Groves barges in. Speaking Lakota, he tells Sitting Bull that they are coming to arrest him at dawn, and that he should send Catherine away in the night for her safety. Sitting Bull sends her out for firewood, and Groves kidnaps her to take her back to the Fort. Hours later, at dawn, they arrive to take Sitting Bull. Catherine struggles through the snow and does not return in time. When they arrest Sitting Bull, a hidden sniper shoots him from his horse, killing him. Catherine hears the shot, and Sitting Bull's horse begins to "dance."

Text on screen reveals the death of Sitting Bull frightened the remaining Lakota into flight. The 7th Cavalry pursued them, ending in the Massacre at Wounded Knee. Catherine remained an advocate for Indians all her life.

== Cast ==
- Jessica Chastain as Catherine Weldon, Painter and Confidante to Sitting Bull.
- Michael Greyeyes as Sitting Bull
- Sam Rockwell as Colonel Silas Grove
- Ciarán Hinds as James McLaughlin, A US Indian Agent
- Michael Nouri as Karl Valentine
- Chaske Spencer as Chaska, A Local Lawman
- Bill Camp as General Crook
- Rulan Tangen as Susan McLaughlin
- Rachel Singer as Dry Goods Assistant
- Louisa Krause as Loretta
- Lyle Sandoval as Tracker

== Production ==
On February 3, 2016, it was reported that Jessica Chastain was in talks to play Sitting Bull's confidante in Woman Walks Ahead, directed by Susanna White. On September 14, 2016, Michael Greyeyes, Sam Rockwell, Ciarán Hinds, Chaske Spencer, and Bill Camp joined the cast, with principal photography having begun in New Mexico.

== Release ==
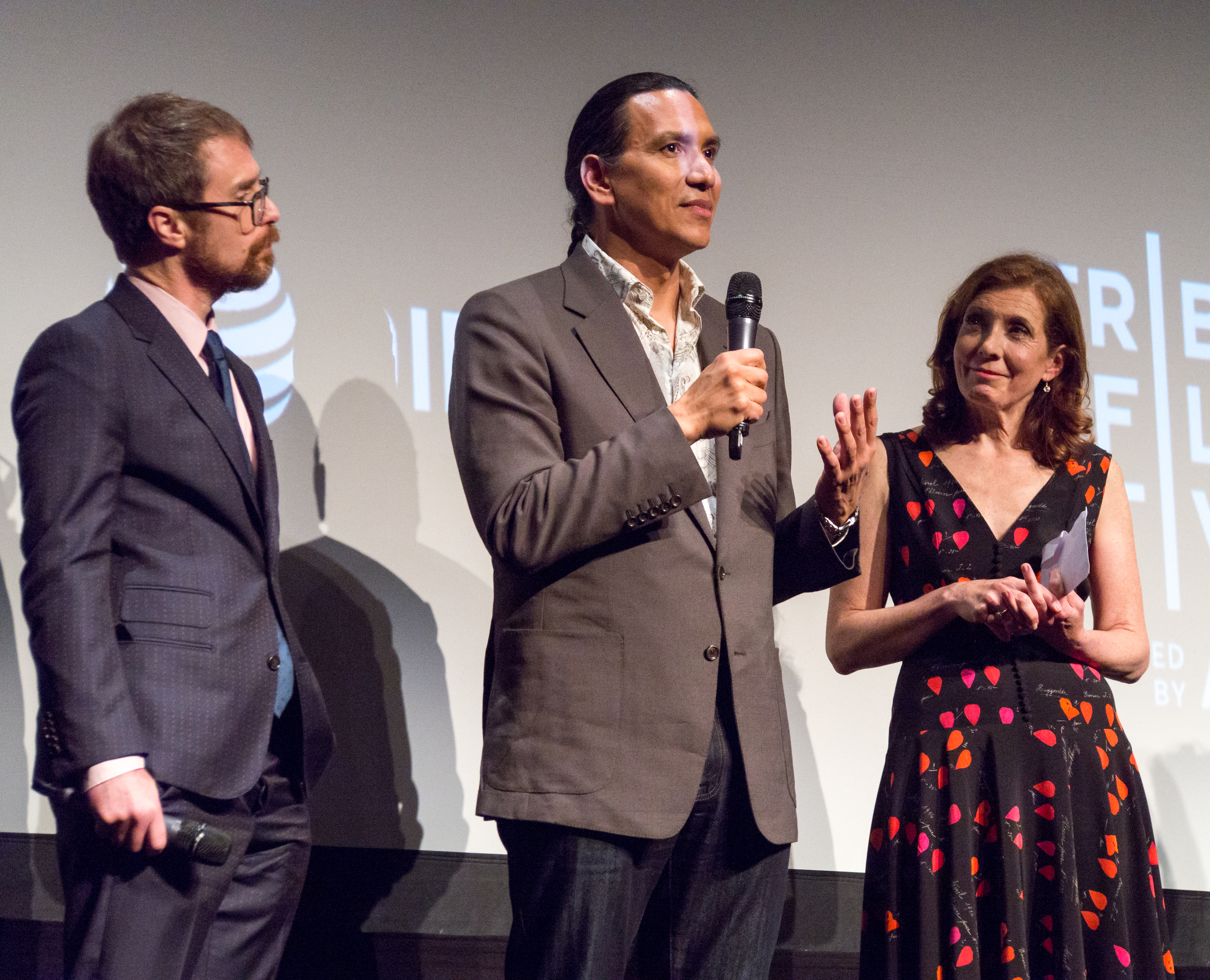
Sam Rockwell, Michael Greyeyes, and Susanna White after the 2018 Tribeca Film Festival screening

The film had its world premiere at the Toronto International Film Festival on September 10, 2017. Shortly after, A24 and DirecTV Cinema acquired distribution rights to the film. Its U.S. premiere was at the Tribeca Film Festival on April 25, 2018.

It was released through DirecTV Cinema on May 31, 2018, before being released in a limited release on June 29, 2018.

== Reception ==
On review aggregator website Rotten Tomatoes, the film holds an approval rating of 59% based on 44 reviews, and an average rating of 5.9/10. The site's critical consensus reads, "Woman Walks Ahead gets some extra mileage out of watchable work from Jessica Chastain and Michael Greyeyes, but uneven pacing and two-dimensional characters undermine their efforts." On Metacritic, which assigns a rating to reviews, the film has a weighted average score of 51 out of 100, based on 19 critics, indicating "mixed or average reviews".

Despite mixed reviews, Michael Greyeyes received critical acclaim for his portrayal of Sitting Bull. The New York Times critic Jeannette Catsoulis called his performance "a miracle of intelligence and dignity". RogerEbert.com contributor Susan Wloszczyna raved about his performance, calling it "the most subtle, soulful, and believable". Los Angeles Times and Village Voice critics described his presence as captivating as “wry wit and quiet gravity”, while the latter described his performance as "stirring".

== Historical accuracy ==
The circumstances of Sitting Bull's death are portrayed inaccurately in Woman Walks Ahead. Near the end of the film, several Indian Agency policemen arrive at Sitting Bull's cabin to arrest him. He surrenders peacefully and mounts a horse. Meanwhile, a solitary gunman of unknown identity lurks in a nearby building. Once Sitting Bull is astride his horse, the gunman fires a single shot, knocking the chief off his mount and killing him instantly.

In truth, Sitting Bull refused to go quietly when the police arrived. There was a struggle between Sitting Bull's followers and the policemen, which resulted in a total of thirteen people being killed, including Sitting Bull.

The portrayal of Catherine Weldon is indeed entirely inaccurate, down to her name - born Susanna Karolina Faesch, she actually went by Caroline Weldon. She arrived at Standing Rock late in her life (with her son), having wished primarily to help the Indians in their social struggle, a cause in which she had been involved for some time. She was well-known and disliked throughout the town, and worked for many years alongside Sitting Bull. The fact that she painted him several times was incidental, and not her primary focus in traveling to the reservation.
