= Corson County, South Dakota =

County in South Dakota, United States

- County
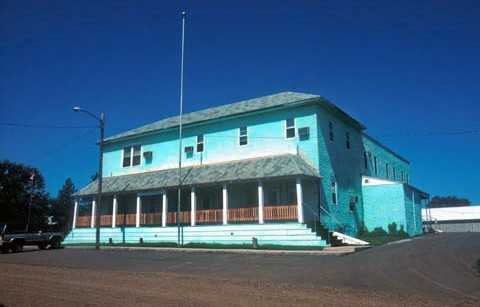
- Corson County Courthouse in Maktáža (English: McIntosh), South Dakota in 1993. This building was destroyed by fire on April 10, 2006.

- Location within the U.S. state of South Dakota
- Coordinates: 45°43′N 101°11′W
- Country: United States
- State: South Dakota
- Founded: 1909
- Named for: Dighton Corson
- Seat: McIntosh
- Largest city: McLaughlin

Area
  - Total: 2,530 sq mi (6,600 km^{2})
  - Land: 2,470 sq mi (6,400 km^{2})
  - Water: 60 sq mi (160 km^{2}) 2.4%

Population (2020)
  - Total: 3,902
  - Estimate (2025): 3,781 ▼
  - Density: 1.58/sq mi (0.610/km^{2})
- Time zone: UTC−7 (Mountain)
  - Summer (DST): UTC−6 (MDT)
- Congressional district: At-large
- Website: corsoncountysd.gov

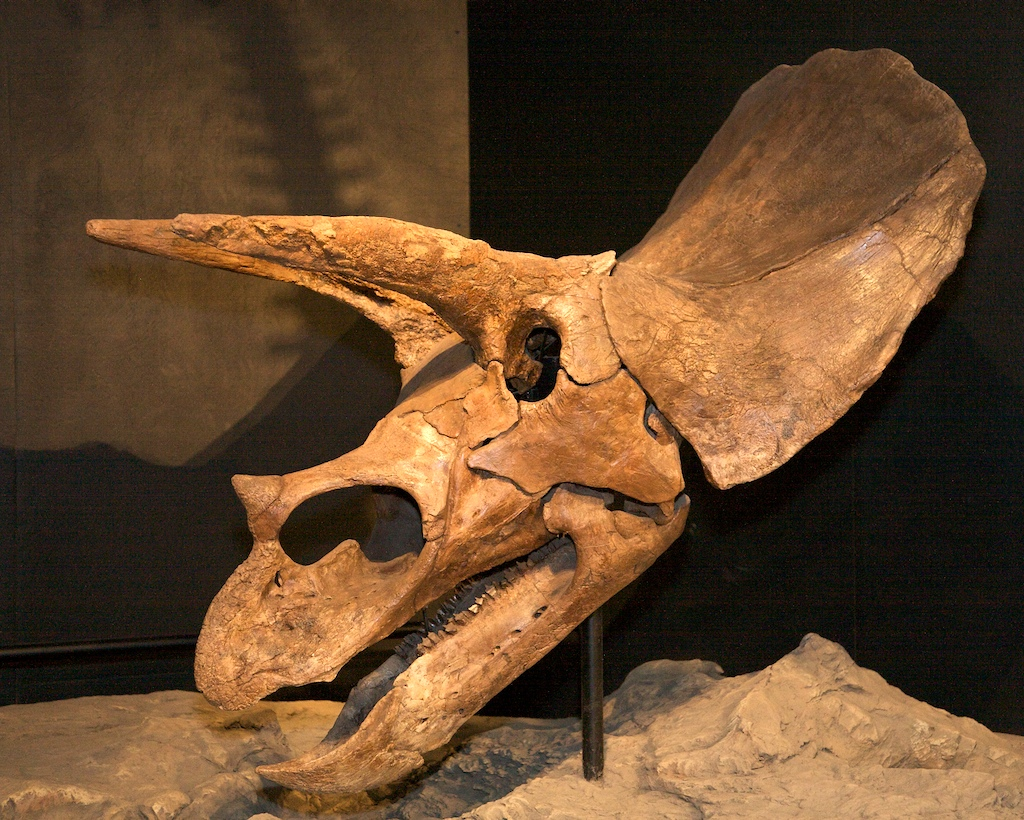
Triceratops skull from Corson County. Collections of Houston Museum of Natural Science.

Corson County is a county in the U.S. state of South Dakota. As of the 2020 census, the population was 3,902. Its county seat is McIntosh. The county was named for Dighton Corson, a native of Maine, who came to the Black Hills in 1876, and in 1877 began practicing law at Deadwood.

The county is encompassed within the Standing Rock Sioux Reservation, which extends into North Dakota. The Lakota people reside primarily in the South Dakota part of the reservation; the Yanktonai and Dakota live in that part in North Dakota. The Grand River, a tributary of the Missouri River, runs through the reservation.

== Geography ==
Corson County lies on the north line of South Dakota. Its north boundary line abuts the south boundary line of the state of North Dakota. The Missouri River flows south-southeastward along its eastern boundary line. The county terrain consists of semi-arid rolling hills. A portion of the land is dedicated to agriculture. The Grand River flows eastward through the central part of the county to discharge into the river, and Standing Cloud Creek flows eastward through the county's lower SW area. The terrain generally slopes to the east and south; its highest point is near its NW corner, at 2,582 ft (787 m) ASL.

Corson County has a total area of 2,530 square miles (6,600 km^{2}), of which 2,470 square miles (6,400 km^{2}) is land and 60 square miles (160 km^{2}) (2.4%) is water. It is the fifth-largest county in South Dakota by area. The entire county lies within the Standing Rock Sioux Reservation, which also includes Sioux, Ziebach, and Dewey counties.

The eastern portion of South Dakota's counties (48 of 66) observe Central Time; the western counties (18 of 66) observe Mountain Time. Corson County is the easternmost of the SD counties to observe Mountain Time.

=== Major highways ===
- U.S. Highway 12
- South Dakota Highway 20
- South Dakota Highway 63
- South Dakota Highway 65
- South Dakota Highway 1806

=== Adjacent counties ===
- Sioux County, North Dakota – north (eastern half of county observes Central Time)
- Campbell County – east (observes Central Time)
- Walworth County – southeast (observes Central Time)
- Dewey County – south
- Ziebach County – southwest
- Perkins County – west
- Adams County, North Dakota – northwest

=== Protected areas ===
- Grand River National Grassland (partial)
- C.C. Lee State Game Production Area

=== Lakes ===
- Mallard
- McGee
- McIntosh
- Morristown East
- Morristown West
- Lake Oahe (part)
- Pudwell
- Trail City

=== Rivers and Streams ===
- Missouri River
- Grand River
- White Shirt Creek
- Hump Creek
- Stink Creek
- Black Horse Butte Creek
- Soldier Creek
- Firesteel Creek
- Oak Creek
- Rock Creek
- Cottonwood Creek
- High Bank Creek

=== Peaks ===
- Hump Butte
- Black Horse Butte
- Rattlesnake Butte
- Elk Butte

== Demographics ==
Historical population
Census	Pop.	Note	%±
1910	2,929		—
1920	7,249		147.5%
1930	9,535		31.5%
1940	6,755		−29.2%
1950	6,168		−8.7%
1960	5,798		−6.0%
1970	4,994		−13.9%
1980	5,196		4.0%
1990	4,195		−19.3%
2000	4,181		−0.3%
2010	4,050		−3.1%
2020	3,902		−3.7%
2025 (est.)	3,781	▼	−3.1%
U.S. Decennial Census; 1790–1960 1900–1990; 1990–2000 2010–2020

=== 2020 census ===
As of the 2020 census, there were 3,902 people, 1,196 households, and 825 families residing in the county. Of the residents, 34.6% were under the age of 18 and 12.5% were 65 years of age or older; the median age was 30.5 years. For every 100 females there were 104.1 males, and for every 100 females age 18 and over there were 105.6 males. The population density was 1.6 inhabitants per square mile (0.62/km^{2}). There were 1,362 housing units, of which 12.2% were vacant. Among occupied housing units, 56.0% were owner-occupied and 44.0% were renter-occupied. The homeowner vacancy rate was 0.4% and the rental vacancy rate was 4.0%. The racial makeup of the county was 24.5% White, 0.2% Black or African American, 70.1% American Indian and Alaska Native, 0.5% Asian, 0.2% from some other race, and 4.6% from two or more races. Hispanic or Latino residents of any race comprised 1.2% of the population. Of the 1,196 households, 41.8% had children under the age of 18 living with them and 27.5% had a female householder with no spouse or partner present. About 27.1% of all households were made up of individuals and 9.6% had someone living alone who was 65 years of age or older.

=== 2010 census ===
As of the 2010 census, there were 4,050 people, 1,260 households, and 939 families in the county. The population density was 1.6 inhabitants per square mile (0.62/km^{2}). There were 1,540 housing units at an average density of 0.6 per square mile (0.23/km^{2}). The racial makeup of the county was 67.0% American Indian, 29.7% white, 0.3% Asian, 0.1% black or African American, 0.3% from other races, and 2.6% from two or more races. Those of Hispanic or Latino origin made up 2.6% of the population. In terms of ancestry,

Of the 1,260 households, 45.6% had children under the age of 18 living with them, 40.6% were married couples living together, 21.9% had a female householder with no husband present, 25.5% were non-families, and 22.7% of all households were made up of individuals. The average household size was 3.21 and the average family size was 3.73. The median age was 29.7 years.

The median income for a household in the county was $30,877 and the median income for a family was $36,500. Males had a median income of $32,037 versus $23,167 for females. The per capita income for the county was $13,359. About 24.1% of families and 35.1% of the population were below the poverty line, including 46.7% of those under age 18 and 16.9% of those age 65 or over.

== Communities ==
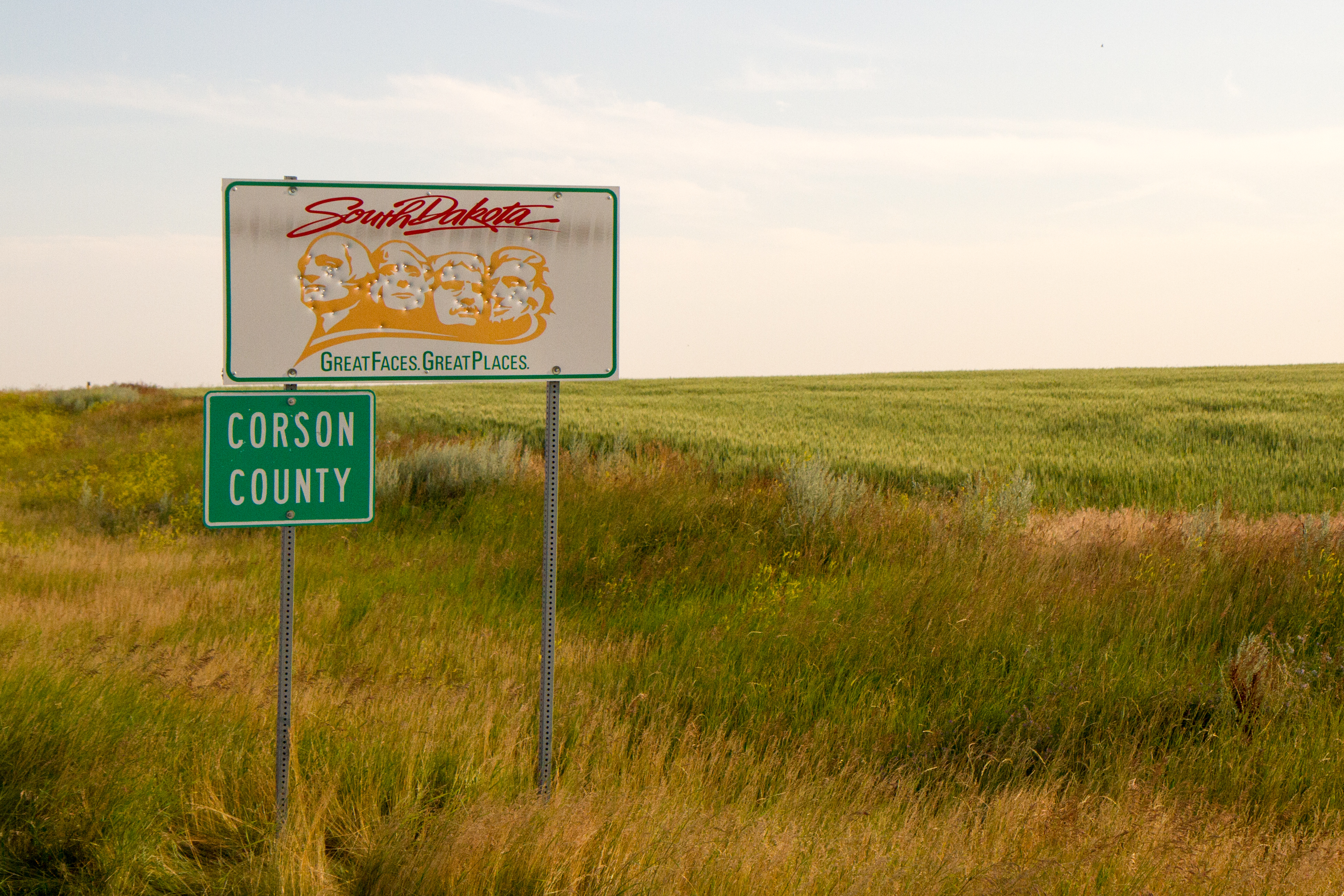
Entering Corson County along Highway 63

=== Cities ===
- McIntosh (county seat)
- McLaughlin

=== Town ===
- Morristown

=== Census-designated places ===
- Bullhead
- Kenel
- Little Eagle
- Wakpala

=== Unincorporated communities ===
- Athboy
- Black Horse
- Jeffrey
- Keldron
- Mahto
- Maple Leaf
- Miscol
- Snake Creek
- Thunder Hawk
- Trail City
- Walker
- Watauga

=== Townships ===
- Custer
- Delaney
- Lake
- Mission
- Pleasant Ridge
- Prairie View
- Ridgeland
- Rolling Green
- Sherman
- Wakpala
- Watauga

=== Unorganized territories ===
- Central Corson
- Lemmon No. 2
- Northeast Corson
- West Corson

== Politics ==
In the 2020 presidential election, Corson County was the county or equivalent with the highest percentage of Native Americans which Donald Trump won, after Joe Biden flipped Ziebach County.

United States presidential election results for Corson County, South Dakota
Year	Republican		Democratic		Third party(ies)	
Year	No.	%	No.	%	No.	%
1912	0	0.00%	455	44.26%	573	55.74%
1916	503	42.20%	641	53.78%	48	4.03%
1920	1,448	60.89%	484	20.35%	446	18.76%
1924	1,364	56.50%	140	5.80%	910	37.70%
1928	1,847	56.92%	1,374	42.34%	24	0.74%
1932	946	27.15%	2,403	68.97%	135	3.87%
1936	1,408	42.73%	1,781	54.05%	106	3.22%
1940	1,709	56.27%	1,328	43.73%	0	0.00%
1944	1,008	56.19%	786	43.81%	0	0.00%
1948	1,154	49.63%	1,154	49.63%	17	0.73%
1952	1,757	69.01%	789	30.99%	0	0.00%
1956	1,394	55.63%	1,112	44.37%	0	0.00%
1960	1,290	54.13%	1,093	45.87%	0	0.00%
1964	1,034	43.78%	1,328	56.22%	0	0.00%
1968	1,108	55.15%	821	40.87%	80	3.98%
1972	975	58.28%	689	41.18%	9	0.54%
1976	846	46.41%	967	53.04%	10	0.55%
1980	1,233	66.47%	522	28.14%	100	5.39%
1984	955	54.48%	792	45.18%	6	0.34%
1988	710	49.03%	722	49.86%	16	1.10%
1992	483	38.61%	444	35.49%	324	25.90%
1996	533	41.00%	539	41.46%	228	17.54%
2000	629	50.60%	549	44.17%	65	5.23%
2004	720	41.76%	972	56.38%	32	1.86%
2008	535	38.05%	837	59.53%	34	2.42%
2012	515	42.92%	648	54.00%	37	3.08%
2016	588	50.04%	535	45.53%	52	4.43%
2020	647	50.43%	622	48.48%	14	1.09%
2024	631	55.21%	495	43.31%	17	1.49%

== See also ==
- National Register of Historic Places listings in Corson County, South Dakota
