= Harding Schoolhouse =

- U.S. National Register of Historic Places
- Location within South Dakota Location within the United States
- Nearest city: Trail City, South Dakota
- Coordinates: 45.552687°N 100.833251°W
- Area: 1 acre (0.40 ha)
- Built by: Pat O'Leary
- Architectural style: Rectangular pen plan
- NRHP reference No.: 89000832
- Added to NRHP: July 13, 1989

The Harding Schoolhouse, in Corson County, South Dakota near Trail City, was listed on the National Register of Historic Places in 1989.

It is a wood-frame schoolhouse built in 1931, a late date for such a structure.

It is located about 5 miles (8.0 km) west and 5.5 miles (8.9 km) north of Trail City.
