= Clarks Fork Creek =

Stream in South Dakota, USA

Clarks Fork Creek Tributary to South Fork Grand River
- Location of Clarks Fork Creek mouth Clarks Fork Creek (the United States)

Location
- Country: United States
- State: South Dakota
- Counties: Harding

Physical characteristics
- Source: North Fork Moreau River divide
  - location: about 12 miles south-southwest of Buffalo, South Dakota
  - coordinates: 45°24′36.98″N 103°36′31.70″W
  - elevation: 3,210 ft (980 m)
- Mouth: South Fork Grand River
  - location: about 10 miles east-northeast of Buffalo, South Dakota
  - coordinates: 45°36′59.99″N 103°20′36.66″W
  - elevation: 2,720 ft (830 m)
- Length: 27.74 mi (44.64 km)
- Basin size: 248.20 square miles (642.8 km^{2})
- Discharge
  - location: South Fork Grand River
  - average: 17.04 cu ft/s (0.483 m^{3}/s) at mouth with South Fork Grand River

Basin features
- Progression: South Fork Grand River → Grand River → Missouri River → Mississippi River → Gulf of Mexico
- River system: Grand River
- Tributaries
  - left: Buffalo Creek
  - right: Slim Buttes Creek; Sioux Creek
- Bridges: unnamed road (x2), US 85, JB Road, SD 20

Clarks Fork Creek, also called Clarks Fork or Sand Creek, is a stream in Harding County, South Dakota, United States. It is a tributary of Grand River.

Clarks Fork Creek was named after Dorr Clark, a local rancher who established the headquarters of a cattle outfit about one mile northeast of the mouth of the stream.

== Variant names ==
According to the Geographic Names Information System, it has also been known historically as:

- Clark's Fork
- Clarks Forks Creek
- Sand Creek

== See also ==
- List of rivers of South Dakota
