= Bullhead, South Dakota =

Bullhead, South Dakota Íŋyaŋ Čhúŋkaške
- CDP
- Location in Corson County and the state of South Dakota
- Coordinates: 45°46′09″N 101°04′51″W
- Country: United States
- State: South Dakota
- County: Corson

Area
  - Total: 3.09 sq mi (8.00 km^{2})
  - Land: 3.02 sq mi (7.81 km^{2})
  - Water: 0.077 sq mi (0.20 km^{2})
- Elevation: 1,782 ft (543 m)

Population (2020)
  - Total: 308
  - Density: 102.2/sq mi (39.45/km^{2})
- Time zone: UTC-7 (Mountain (MST))
  - Summer (DST): UTC-6 (MDT)
- ZIP code: 57621
- Area code: 605
- FIPS code: 46-08460
- GNIS feature ID: 2393356

Bullhead (Lakota: Íŋyaŋ Čhúŋkaške) is a census-designated place (CDP) in Corson County, South Dakota, United States, within the Standing Rock Sioux Reservation. As of the 2020 census, Bullhead had a population of 308.

== History ==
The community has the name of Bullhead, a member of the Indian police who was killed in an altercation near the town site.

== Geography ==
According to the United States Census Bureau, the CDP has a total area of 3.1 square miles (8.0 km^{2}), of which 3.0 square miles (7.8 km^{2}) is land and 0.1 square miles (0.26 km^{2}) (2.59%) is water.

== Demographics ==
Historical population
Census	Pop.	Note	%±
2020	308		—
U.S. Decennial Census

As of the census of 2000, there were 308 people, 67 households, and 55 families residing in the CDP. The population density was 102.3 inhabitants per square mile (39.5/km^{2}). There were 74 housing units at an average density of 24.6/sq mi (9.5/km^{2}). The racial makeup of the CDP was 3.57% White, 96.10% Native American, and 0.32% from two or more races. Hispanic or Latino of any race were 3.25% of the population.

There were 67 households, out of which 55.2% had children under the age of 18 living with them, 32.8% were married couples living together, 34.3% had a female householder with no husband present, and 17.9% were non-families. 13.4% of all households were made up of individuals, and 1.5% had someone living alone who was 65 years of age or older. The average household size was 4.60 and the average family size was 5.00.

In the CDP, the population was spread out, with 44.8% under the age of 18, 15.3% from 18 to 24, 22.4% from 25 to 44, 13.3% from 45 to 64, and 4.2% who were 65 years of age or older. The median age was 20 years. For every 100 females, there were 104.0 males. For every 100 females age 18 and over, there were 102.4 males.

The median income for a household in the CDP was $14,000, and the median income for a family was $18,000. Males had a median income of $14,500 versus $18,333 for females. The per capita income for the CDP was $4,029. About 44.8% of families and 46.5% of the population were below the poverty line, including 40.0% of those under the age of 18 and 55.6% of those 65 or over.
