= Caroline Weldon =

American activist (1844–1921)

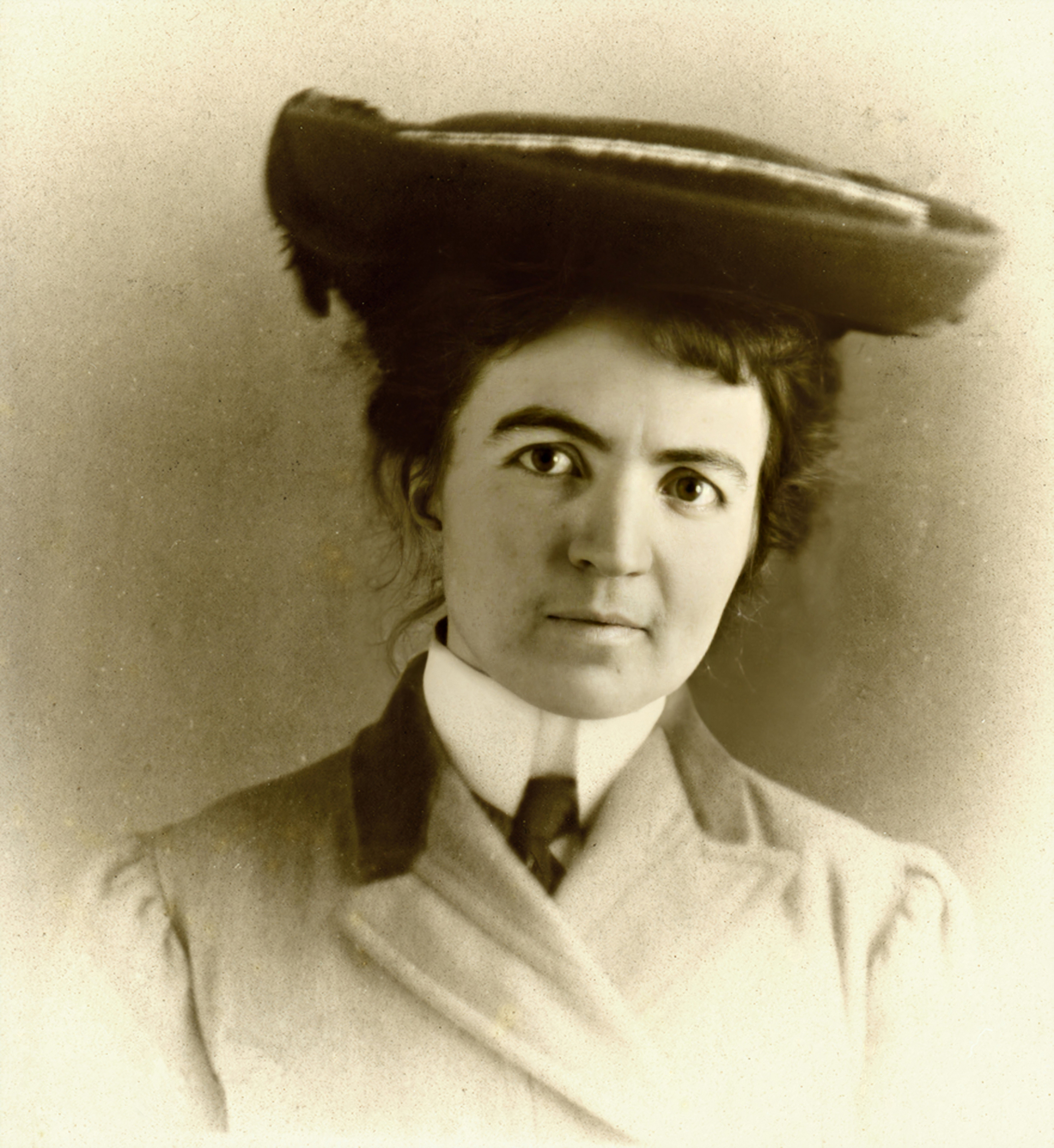
- Weldon c. 1878–1882
- Born: Susanna Karolina Faesch; 4 December 1844; Basel, Switzerland
- Died: 15 March 1921 (aged 76); Brooklyn, New York, U.S.
- Occupations: Artist, Indian Rights activist
- Spouse: Bernhard Schlatter (m. 1866; div. 1883)
- Children: 1
- Relatives: Faesch family
- Writing career
- Pen name: Caroline Weldon

Susanna Karolina Faesch (December 4, 1844 – March 15, 1921) colloquially known by her pen name Caroline Weldon was a Swiss American artist and activist with the National Indian Defense Association. Weldon became a confidante and the personal secretary to the Lakota Sioux Indian leader Sitting Bull during the time when Plains Indians had adopted the Ghost Dance movement.

== Early life and education ==
Weldon was born Susanna Karolina Faesch on December 4, 1844 in Basel, Switzerland, to Johann Lukas Faesch (1799–1867), a military officer serving in a Swiss regiment in France, and Anna Maria Barbara Faesch (née Marti; 1807–1887), into the Faesch family, which was part of the Daig. She had an older sister and a younger brother.

In 1848, her mother fell in love with the German-born Karl Heinrich Valentiny, a revolutionary and physician, who resided in exile in Basel. In 1849, her parents were formally divorced, and they emigrated to Brooklyn, New York in 1852, where they joined Valentiny, who operated a medical practice there.

== Career ==
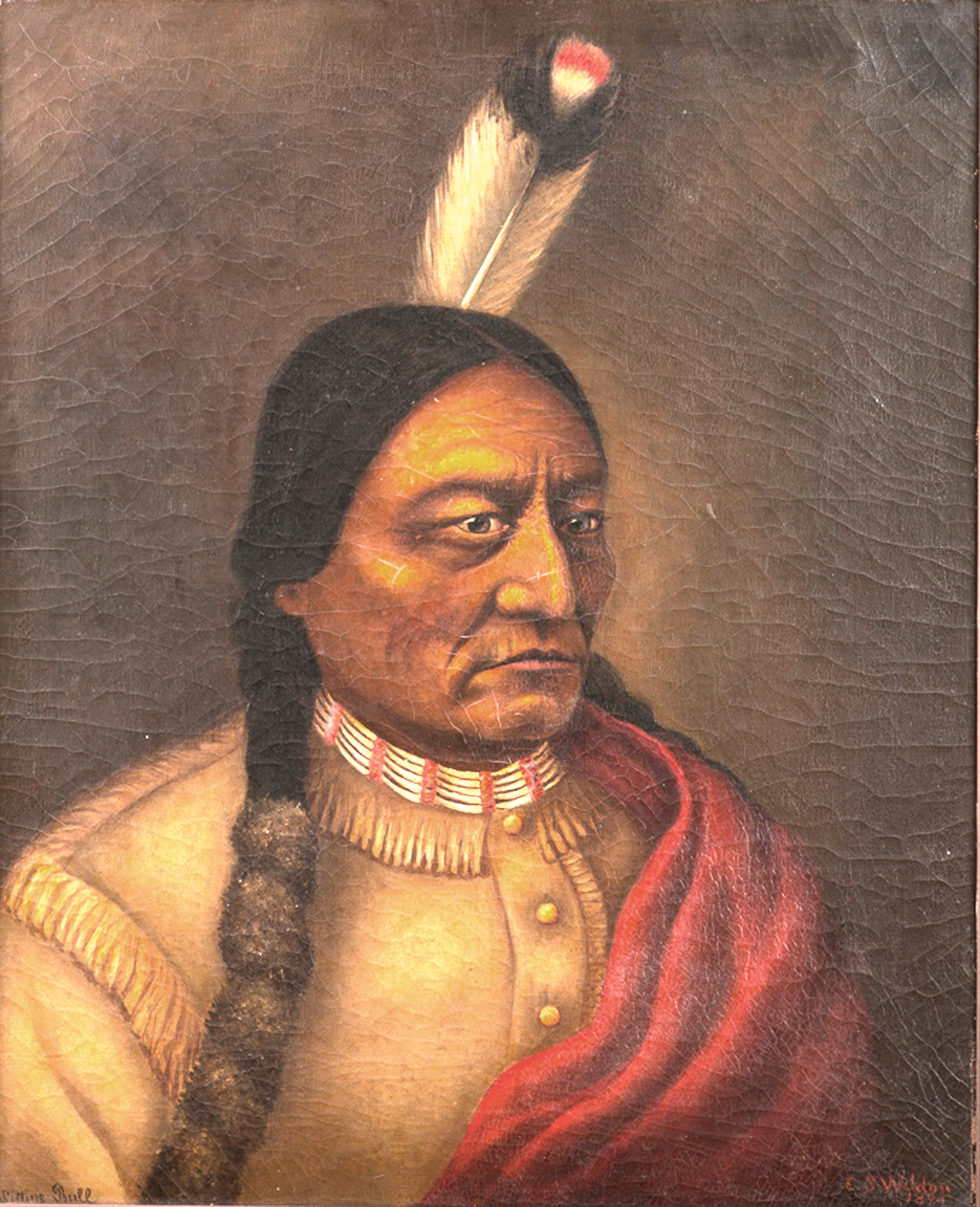
Sitting Bull, by Caroline Weldon, 1890, oil on canvas

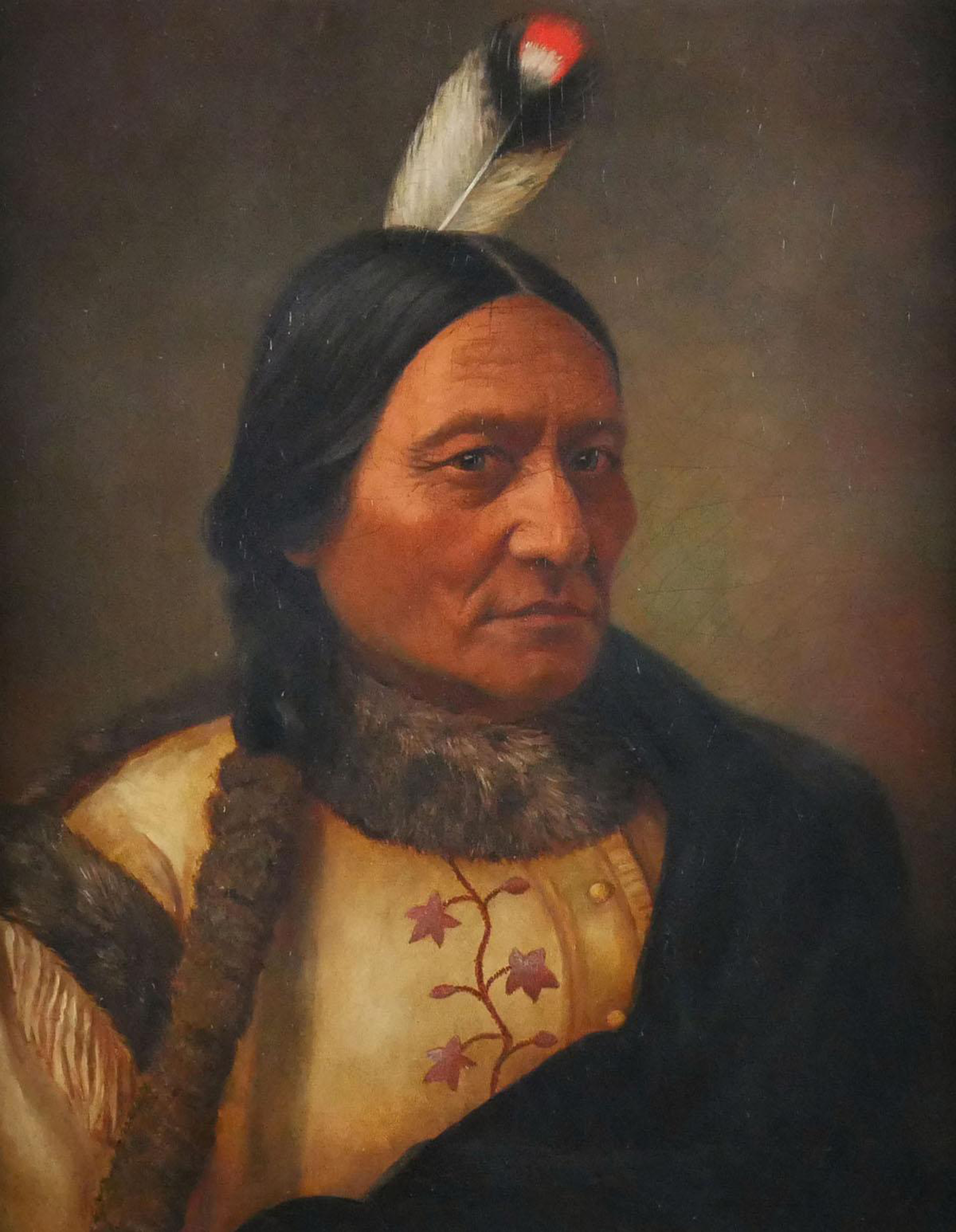
Sitting Bull, oil on canvas, painted by Caroline Weldon in 1890 based on a photograph by Palmquist & Jurgens dated March 1884

Following her desertion by Stevenson and her divorce from Bernhard Schlatter, Weldon became committed to the cause of Native Americans. Upon her mother's death in 1887, she inherited some money which gave her the means to pursue her interests freely, including her interest in art. Sometime thereafter, she changed her name to Caroline Weldon, presumably to allow her to put her past behind her, although her exact reasons for this action remain unknown.

In the summer of 1889, Caroline Weldon traveled to Dakota Territory to fulfill her dream of living among the Sioux. She joined the National Indian Defense Association (NIDA), headed by Dr. Thomas Bland and his wife Cora Bland. Weldon began to aid the Sioux in their struggle to fight the US government's attempt via the Dawes Act to expropriate vast portions of the Great Sioux Reservation for the purpose of opening some up for white settlement and with the intent of rendering the creations of the two new states of North Dakota and South Dakota economically viable. Weldon befriended Sitting Bull, leader of the traditionalist faction among the Sioux, and she acted as his secretary, interpreter, and advocate. She painted four portraits of Sitting Bull, three of which are known to have survived. One is now held by the North Dakota Historical Society in Bismarck, North Dakota, the other at the Historic Arkansas Museum in Little Rock, Arkansas and a third one was sold at auction in Florida in April 2023 remaining in private hands.

After she had moved with her young son Christie to live at Sitting Bull's compound on the Grand River at Standing Rock Indian Reservation, her confrontations and open defiance of Indian Agent James McLaughlin engendered enmity. McLaughlin initiated a smear campaign, resulting in her being reviled by much of the white community and vilified in the national press. When the Ghost Dance Movement swept through the Indian Reservations of the West in the summer of 1890, she denounced the movement. Weldon warned Sitting Bull that the Ghost Dance movement would give the government a pretext to harm him and to summon the military for intervention which would destroy the Sioux Nation. Sitting Bull turned against her and, upon her son falling ill in November, she decided to leave.

While traveling via riverboat to her new home in Kansas City, Missouri, her son died near Pierre, South Dakota, on 19 November 1890. The subsequent events of Sitting Bull's murder on 15 December 1890, and the Wounded Knee massacre on 29 December 1890, added to her sense of futility and failure. She lived briefly in Kansas City with her nephew Friedrich William Schleicher, a school teacher, only to return eventually to Brooklyn. She disappeared into obscurity soon after.

== Personal life ==
In 1866, Susanna Carolina Faesch was married in Brooklyn to Bernhard Claudius Schlatter, a physician and fellow Swiss. Her marriage to Schlatter proved to be childless and unhappy.

In June 1876, she ran away with a married man identified in court records as Christopher J. Stevenson. Briefly residing with Stevenson in a rented apartment in Hoboken, New Jersey, she gave birth to a boy named Christie around late 1876 or early 1877. Her relationship with Stevenson deteriorated, and he soon abandoned her to return to his wife of many years. Caroline returned to Brooklyn to live with her mother and stepfather. Her estranged husband Bernhard Schlatter filed for divorce, which was granted in 1883.

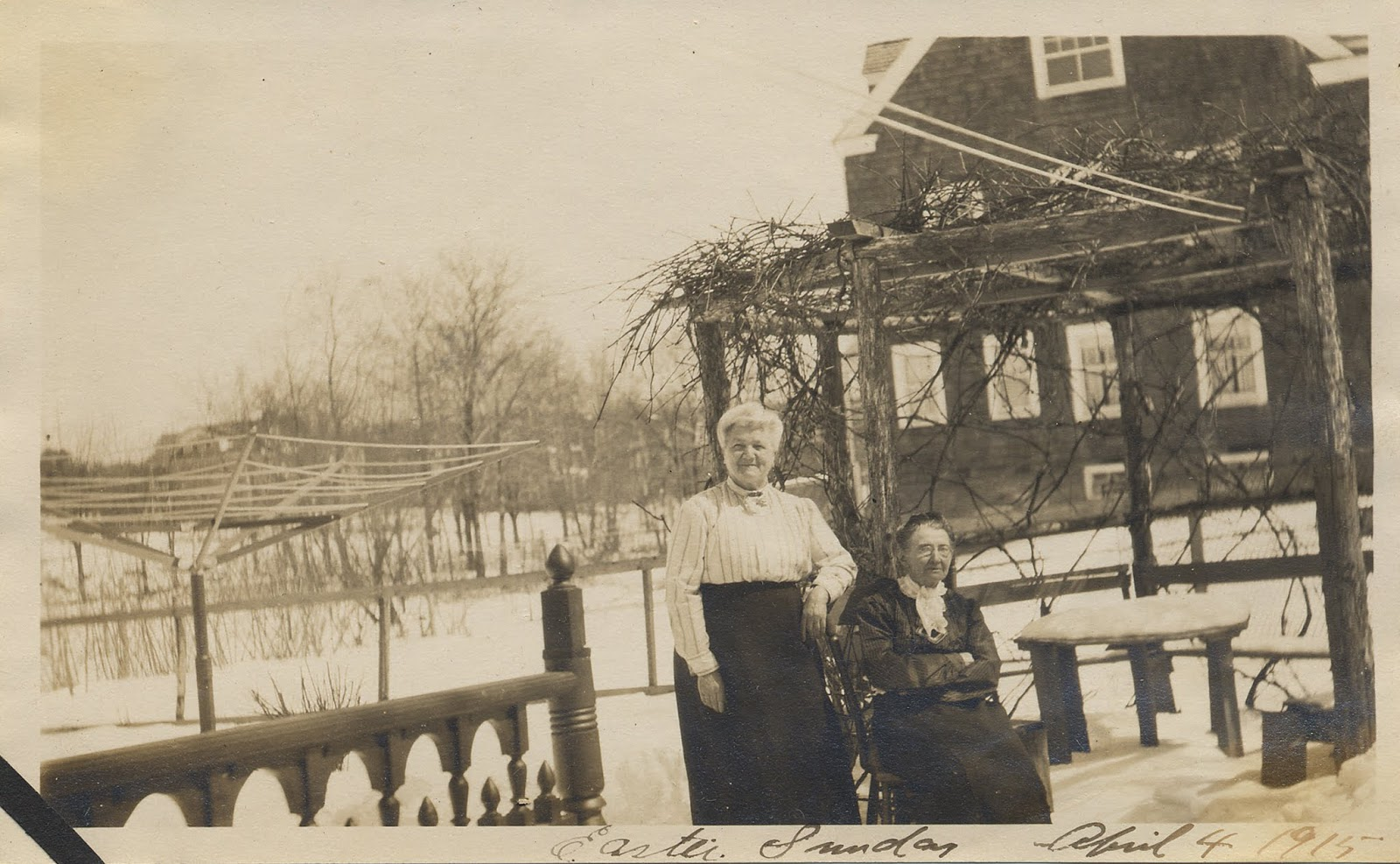
Caroline Weldon (right) and her friend Aline Estoppey in Mount Vernon, New York, 4 April 1915

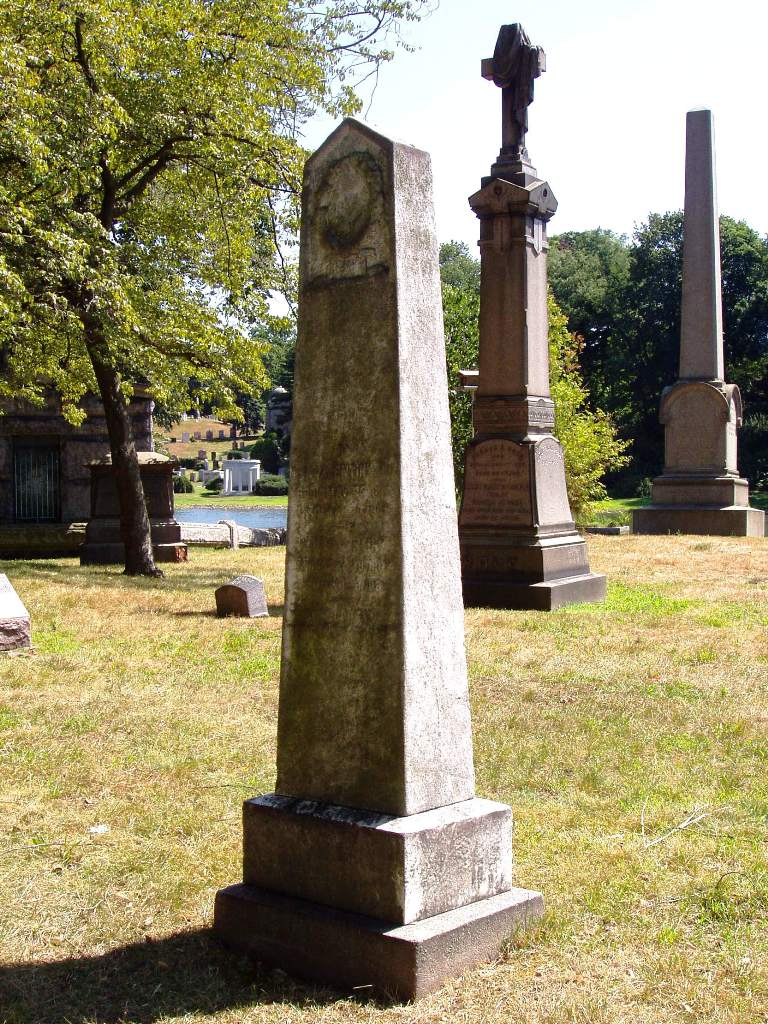
Weldon Grave at Green Wood Cemetery in Brooklyn, New York

Weldon died at Holy Family Hospital or at her home in Brooklyn on March 15, 1921. The cause of death was accidental third degree burns to her face and body caused by a fire at her home that was sparked by a candle. She was interred at the Valentiny family plot at Green Wood Cemetery in Brooklyn, New York.

== Legacy ==
The poet and playwright Derek Walcott refers to Weldon and her life in his play The Ghost Dance and in his epic poem Omeros. (In the poem, she is referred to as Catherine Weldon.) He features Native American history together with that of the demise of the Native Arawak people in St. Lucia, in the Caribbean.

The film Woman Walks Ahead starring Jessica Chastain chronicles Weldon's life among the Sioux. "Weldon, 52 years old at this point, went to Standing Rock (in June 1889 and again in May 1890) first and foremost to be Sitting Bull’s “advocate and translator.” The scene in the movie in which Weldon, who was not very wealthy, gives her money and possessions to feed the hungry people is fairly accurate. The people she helped rewarded her with a name: “Woman Walking Ahead.” But the four portraits of Sitting Bull she painted during that time were not the main reason she went out there, contrary to the impression some might get from watching the film."

Green-Wood Cemetery in Brooklyn, N.Y., celebrated Women's History Month by hosting a special trolley tour called "Women Who Walked Ahead" on 31 March 2018 and it included the graves (both marked and unmarked) of notable women from Brooklyn, including Caroline Weldon.
