= Hump Creek (Corson County, South Dakota) =

Stream in South Dakota, U.S.

Coordinates: 45°44′03″N 101°15′48″W

Hump Creek is a stream in the U.S. state of South Dakota.

Hump Creek takes its name from nearby Hump Butte.

== See also ==
- List of rivers of South Dakota
