= Maple Leaf, South Dakota =

Coordinates: 45°55′29″N 100°53′26″W

Maple Leaf (also rendered Mapleleaf) is an extinct town in Corson County, in the U.S. state of South Dakota. The GNIS classifies it as a populated place.

== History ==
Maple Leaf was laid out in 1915. A post office called Mapleleaf was in operation between 1920 and 1943.
