= Holy Spirit Chapel =

Historic church in South Dakota, United States

- U.S. National Register of Historic Places
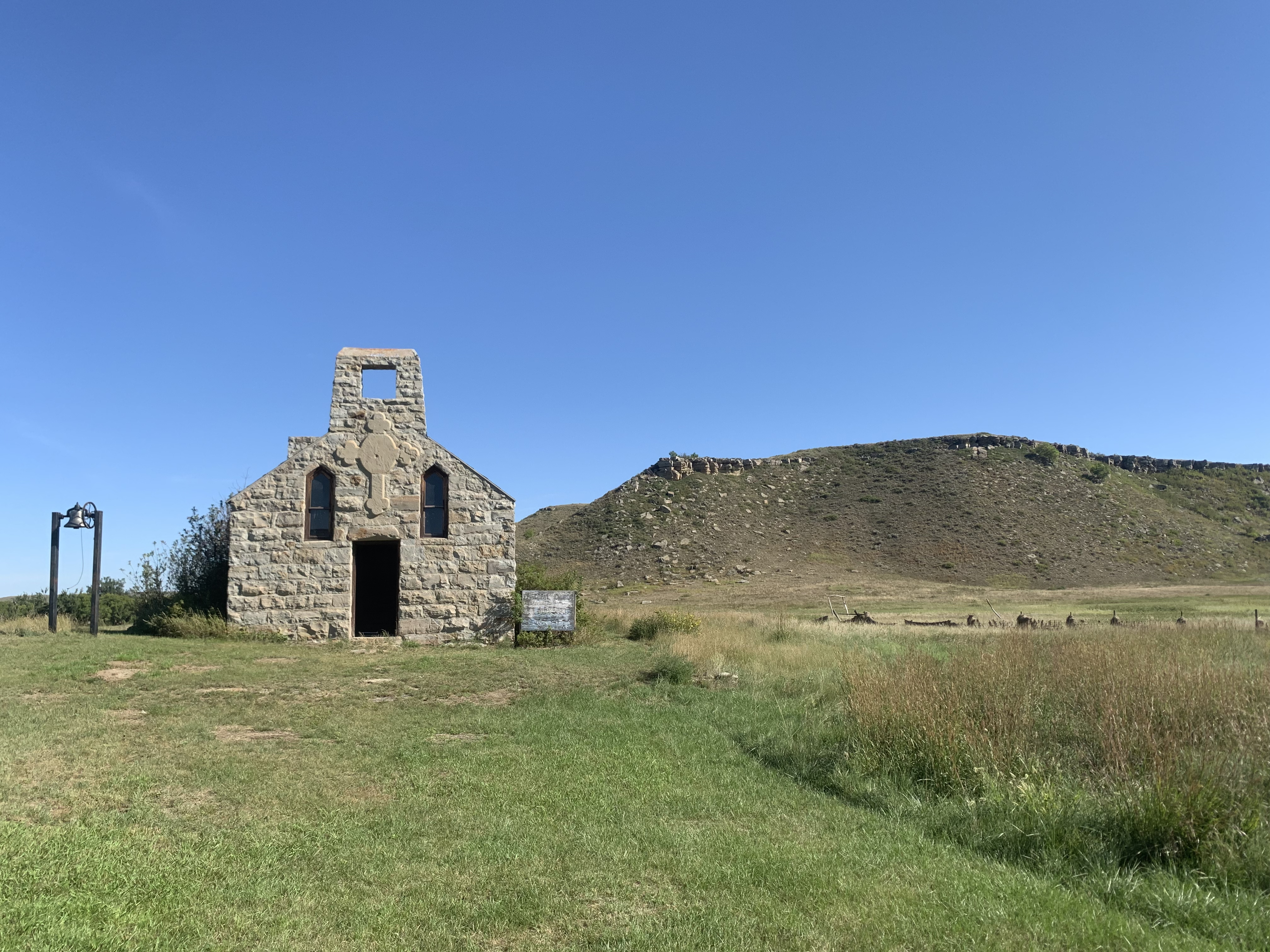

- Location within South Dakota Location within the United States
- Nearest city: Firesteel, South Dakota
- Coordinates: 45°37′37″N 101°17′32″W
- Area: less than one acre
- Built: 1923
- Built by: Waggoner, Frank
- Architect: Alfred Morton Githens
- Architectural style: Late Gothic Revival
- NRHP reference No.: 95000817
- Added to NRHP: July 7, 1995

The Holy Spirit Chapel in Firesteel, South Dakota was built in 1923 on the east bank of Firesteel Creek. It was added to the National Register of Historic Places in 1995. It is also known as the Old Stone Church or the Stone Church.

It was designed by architect Alfred Morton Githens and was built by stonemason and contractor Frank Waggoner. It is 26 by 36 feet (7.9 m × 11.0 m) in plan.

It was deemed notable

as the representative work of a master architect, Alfred Morton Githens and possesses statewide significance. Aside from its partner church on the Pine Ridge Reservation, which has been substantially altered, it is one of the few buildings in South Dakota designed by an architect educated at the Ecole des Beaux Arts. The other most prominent example in the state is Sioux Falls' St. Joseph Cathedral designed by Emmanuel Masquerey which was listed on the register in 1974. The remote location of this property, the native stone used in construction, its interesting vernacular Gothic styling and the fact it was designed by a well known eastern architect contribute to its significance.
