= Watauga, South Dakota =

- Unincorporated community
- Location within South Dakota Location within the United States
- Coordinates: 45°55′22″N 101°32′34″W
- Country: United States
- State: South Dakota
- County: Corson

Area
  - Total: 15.9 sq mi (41.1 km^{2})
  - Land: 15.9 sq mi (41.1 km^{2})
  - Water: 0 sq mi (0.0 km^{2})
- Elevation: 2,261 ft (689 m)

Population (2000)
  - Total: 29
  - Density: 1.8/sq mi (0.7/km^{2})
- Time zone: UTC-7 (Mountain (MST))
  - Summer (DST): UTC-6 (MDT)
- ZIP code: 57660
- Area code: 605
- FIPS code: 46-69260
- GNIS feature ID: 1258838

Watauga is an unincorporated community in Corson County, South Dakota, United States. Although not tracked by the Census Bureau, Watauga has been assigned the ZIP code of 57660.

Watauga is a name derived from the Sioux language meaning "foam".
