= James McLaughlin (Indian agent) =

Canadian-American United States Indian agent and inspector

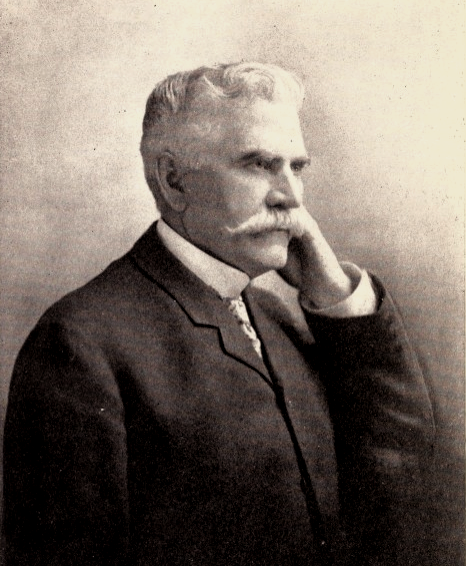
- McLaughlin 1910
- Born: February 12, 1842; Canada West
- Died: July 28, 1923 (aged 81); Washington, D.C., United States
- Known for: US Indian Service Agent who ordered Sitting Bull's arrest
- Spouse: Louise Marie Buisson

James McLaughlin (February 12, 1842 – July 28, 1923) was a Canadian-American United States Indian agent and inspector, best known for having ordered the arrest of Sitting Bull in December 1890, which resulted in the chief's death and later leading to the Wounded Knee Massacre. Before this event, he was known for his positive relations with several tribes. His memoir, published in 1910, was entitled, My Friend the Indian.

McLaughlin emigrated to the United States at the age of 21, living briefly in St. Paul, Minnesota, where he married a Mdewakanton woman of mixed-blood descent. He soon became a citizen. While working as a blacksmith at Fort Totten, he studied to become a U.S. Indian agent, and was selected to supervise the Devils Lake Agency in 1876. He was promoted and transferred in 1881 to the larger Standing Rock Sioux Agency in the Dakotas, working there for many years, in an era of short-term political appointments. In 1895 he was promoted to a position as Inspector of the Bureau of Indian Affairs and Department of Interior, working until his death in 1923 in Washington, D.C.

== Early life and education ==
James McLaughlin was the sixth of nine children born to Felix (Catholic) and Mary (Prince, Protestant) McLaughlin, emigrants from the Province of Ulster, in Ireland to Canada. James was baptized and raised Catholic in Avonmore, Ontario, Canada. He likely attended local schools and also learned the trade of blacksmith.

== Emigration, marriage, and career in United States ==
At the age of 21, in 1863 he emigrated to St. Paul, Minnesota. The following year he married Marie Louise Buisson, a Mdewakanton Dakota woman of mixed-blood (Québécois and Scottish) descent. They had seven children together.

McLaughlin obtained his United States citizenship in 1865. In 1871 he was hired by the commanding officer of Fort Totten, North Dakota, as a blacksmith and general overseer at the Devils Lake Indian Agency; the U.S. Army outpost was in what was then called the Dakota Territory. While there, he studied to become a United States Indian agent; at the time Indian affairs were supervised as part of the Department of the Army. Army officers noted that he established good relations with the Dakota. In 1876 he was appointed as agent of the Devils Lake Agency in present-day North Dakota, a reservation for a Sisseton Wahpeton tribe of the Dakota people.

In 1881, following the movement of Lakota and Dakota bands to Standing Rock Sioux Agency, McLaughlin was assigned to that much larger facility, which held several Sioux bands.

McLaughlin believed his mission was to make Native Americans self-sufficient by encouraging them to assimilate, to become educated according to Western standards and to adopt white/Anglo-American culture, including subsistence farming. Local climate and geographic conditions made such style of agriculture difficult in the Dakotas, as allotments proved to be too small.

In 1888, he and other agents accompanied a large delegation of chiefs from the six Sioux reservations to Washington, D.C., to meet with Bureau of Indian Affairs officials to discuss the Dawes Act. A photograph of McLaughlin and the Standing Rock delegation, including the noted chief Sitting Bull and interpreter Louis Primeau, along with U.S. Commissioners, U.S. Indian Agents, interpreters and many Sioux chiefs, was taken on the front steps of the capital in 1888. The leaders were meeting to discuss implementation of the Dawes Act at the Great Sioux Reservation, then consisting of 22 million acres. The act called for distributing the reservation's communal lands as allotments to heads of individual households. The government intended for the Lakota to adopt subsistence-style farming on the European-American model and give up their nomadic hunting lifestyle. Under the legislation, the government would declare remaining lands after allotment as "surplus," to be made available for sale to white Americans.

To implement the Dawes Act among the Plains tribes, officials registered all tribal members on what have become known as the Dawes Rolls. Documented descent from individuals listed as tribal members on these rolls is required by some sovereign tribes today for a person to qualify as a member; each tribe establishes its own rules.

McLaughlin is best known for having ordered the arrest of Sitting Bull on December 15, 1890. He had been warned by Lt. Bull Head that the chief was preparing to go to the Pine Ridge Reservation, where the Ghost Dance movement was strong. McLaughlin and other U.S. officials feared this would inspire resistance among the Lakota; they worried that the Ghost Dance was a kind of pre-war dance. McLaughlin partially blamed Caroline Weldon, an Indian Rights Activist from Brooklyn, New York, who had befriended Sitting Bull, for having influenced the chief into open defiance. As agency police attempted the arrest of Sitting Bull at his camp by the Grand River, a confrontation with his followers erupted. The chief was shot and killed, along with several Lakota and several agency police. The Lakota were outraged when they learned of the respected chief's murder. Rising tensions among the people led to the Army–Lakota confrontation on Pine Ridge at Wounded Knee two weeks later, resulting in the Army massacre of many Lakota.

As the Department of the Army had oversight over Indian affairs, it frequently gave Indian agents military titles commensurate with their civil service status as government employees. McLaughlin appears as "Major" in his early years as Indian agent. After 1895, when he was promoted to Inspector for the Indian Department and the Department of the Interior, which had been given authority for Indian affairs, and thus is noted as Colonel afterwards.

In 1910 he published a memoir of his life entitled My Friend the Indian.

He died in Washington, D.C., in 1923, while still working. McLaughlin is buried in the town named for him, on the South Dakota side of the Standing Rock reservation.

== Legacy and honors ==
- McLaughlin, South Dakota, was named for him.
- James McLaughlin's papers were passed on to his son Rupert, who died a year after his father. Rupert's widow sold some portions to historians. The manuscript collection, known as the "Major James McLaughlin Papers", was acquired by Assumption Abbey in Richardton, North Dakota, and a basic "Guide" created by Louis Pfaller. With foundation aid, microfilm of the collection, together with supplementary materials obtained from the US National Archives and Records Administration, was completed in 1969. The microfilm collection is held by the Pfau Library Special Collections, California State University at San Bernardino. The 61 feet of McLaughlin Papers are now held by the State Historical Society of North Dakota in Bismarck.
