= Snake Creek (South Fork Grand River tributary) =

Stream in South Dakota

Coordinates: 45°38′12″N 102°36′22″W

Snake Creek is a stream in the U.S. state of South Dakota. It is a tributary of the South Fork Grand River.

The creek was named on account of its irregular course.

== See also ==
- List of rivers of South Dakota
