= Sitting Bull Monument =

- U.S. National Register of Historic Places
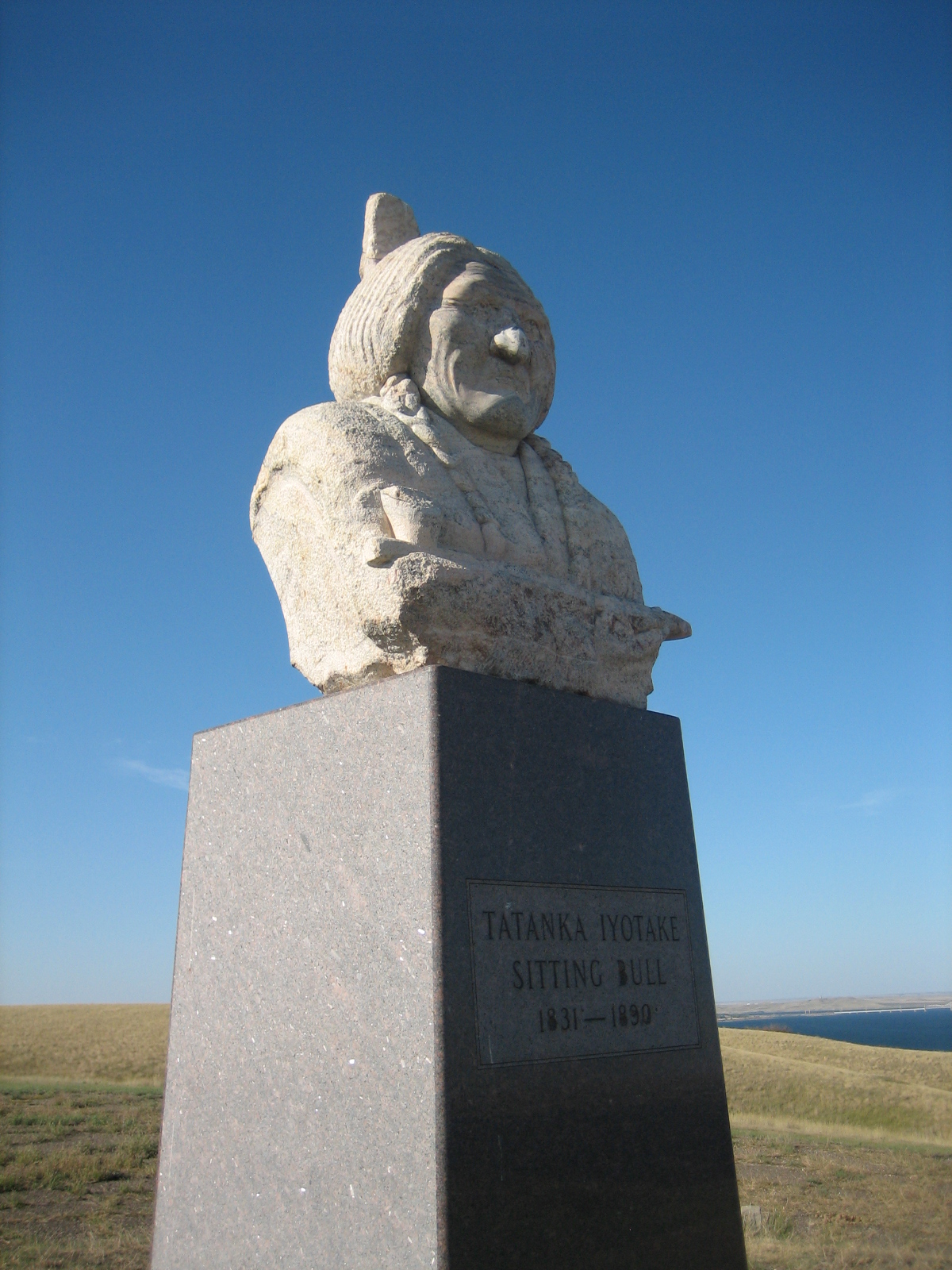

- Location within South Dakota Location within the United States
- Location: SE 1/4 of SE 1/4 of Sec 13 T18 R29, near= Mobridge, South Dakota
- Coordinates: 45°31′08″N 100°29′07″W
- Area: less than one acre
- Built: 1953
- Architect: Korczak Ziolkowski
- NRHP reference No.: 06001008
- Added to NRHP: November 8, 2006

The Sitting Bull Monument, on Standing Rock Sioux Reservation near Mobridge in Corson County, South Dakota, was built in 1953. It was listed on the National Register of Historic Places in 2006.

It is a sculpture by Korczak Ziolkowski of Sitting Bull.
