= Keldron, South Dakota =

- Unincorporated community
- Location within the state of South Dakota Keldron (the United States)
- Coordinates: 45°55′55″N 101°48′35″W
- Country: United States
- State: South Dakota
- County: Corson
- Elevation: 2,372 ft (723 m)
- Time zone: UTC-6 (Central (CST))
  - Summer (DST): UTC-5 (CDT)
- ZIP codes: 57634
- GNIS feature ID: 1261115

Keldron is an unincorporated community in Corson County, South Dakota, United States. Although not tracked by the Census Bureau, Keldron has been assigned the ZIP code of 57634.

Keldron was laid out in 1909, and named for its location in a caldron-shaped valley.
