= Athboy, South Dakota =

Unincorporated community in South Dakota, U.S.

Coordinates: 45°34′27″N 101°55′22″W

Athboy is an unincorporated community in Corson County, in the U.S. state of South Dakota.

== History ==
A post office was established at Athboy in 1916, and remained in operation until 1944. The community was named by postal officials.
