= Norris, South Dakota =

- census-designated place
- Location within South Dakota Location within the United States
- Coordinates: 43°28′20″N 101°11′34″W
- Country: United States
- State: South Dakota
- County: Mellette

Area
  - Total: 0.83 sq mi (2.15 km^{2})
  - Land: 0.83 sq mi (2.15 km^{2})
  - Water: 0 sq mi (0.00 km^{2})
- Elevation: 2,494 ft (760 m)

Population (2020)
  - Total: 150
  - Density: 180.7/sq mi (69.75/km^{2})
- Time zone: UTC-6 (Central (CST))
  - Summer (DST): UTC-5 (CDT)
- ZIP code: 57560
- Area code: 605
- FIPS code: 46-45460
- GNIS feature ID: 2584562

Norris is an unincorporated community in Mellette County, South Dakota, United States. It is not specifically tracked by the Census Bureau, but is included in the census-designated place of the same name. The population of the CDP was 150 at the 2020 census. Norris has a post office that serves the 57560 ZIP code area. The zip code includes the town of Corn Creek.

Norris was laid out in 1910 and named after a nephew of the town's merchant.

== Demographics ==
Historical population
Census	Pop.	Note	%±
2020	150		—
U.S. Decennial Census
