= Thomas Bland =

American physician

Thomas A. Bland
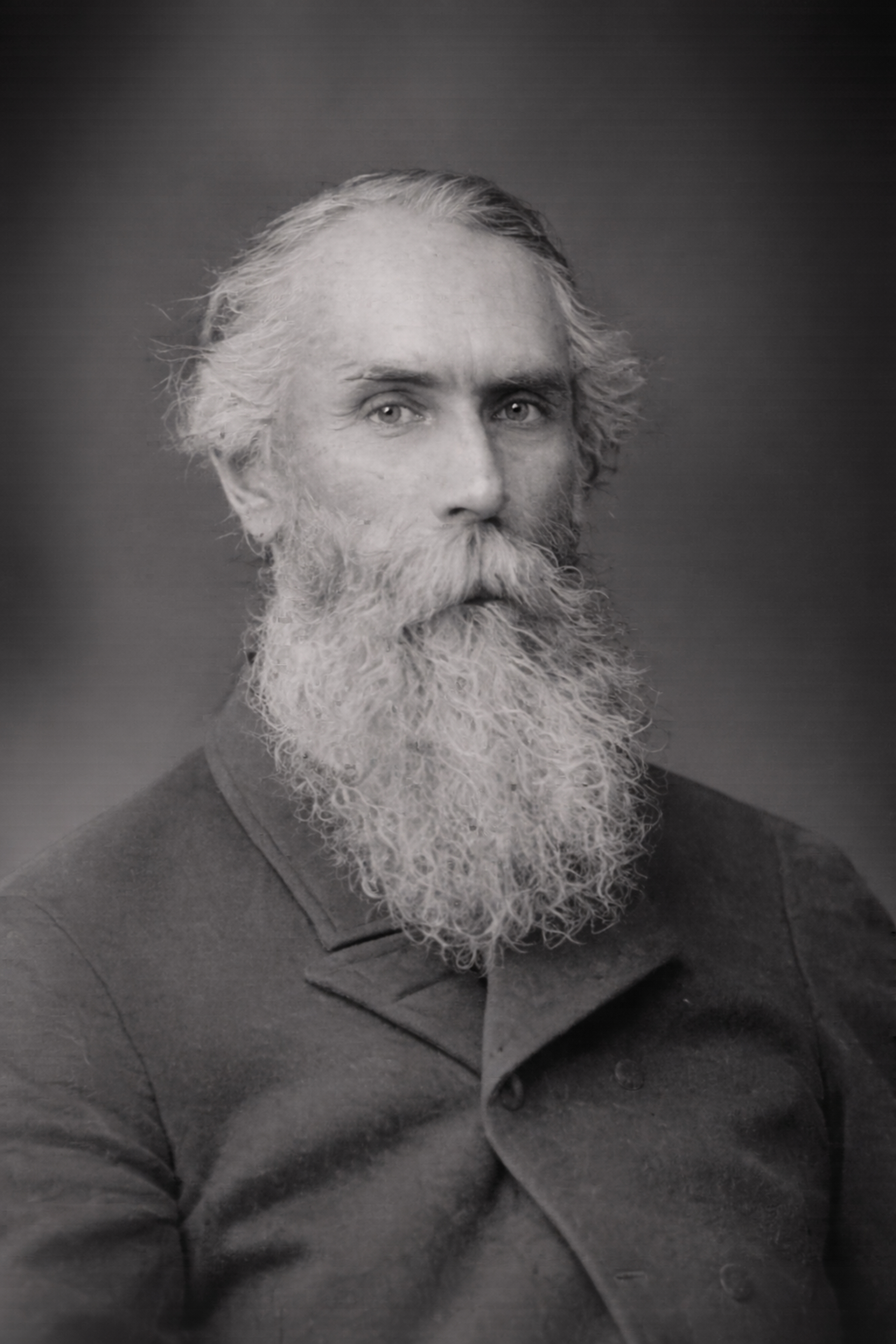
- Bland in 1885
- Born: Thomas Augustus Bland; 21 May 1830; Bloomfield, Indiana, United States
- Died: 3 January 1908 (aged 77); Chicago, Illinois, United States
- Occupations: physician, publisher, Indian Rights activist
- Spouse: Dr. Mary Cornelia "Cora" Davis
- Writing career
- Notable works: publisher of "The Council Fire and Arbitrator", founder of the Indian Rights Association (NIDA)

Dr. Thomas A. Bland (1830–1908) was a 19th-century physician, publisher, Indian Rights Activist, founder of the National Indian Defense Association (NIDA), and publisher of "The Council Fire and Arbitrator".

== Early life and education ==
Born Thomas Augustus Bland on 21 May 1830 at Bloomfield, Indiana to Thomas Bland, a Quaker who hailed from North Carolina. Raised on a farm, Bland's early education was largely self-taught. He chose the career of a physician, graduating from the Eclectic College of Cincinnati, Ohio. In 1852, Bland married Mary Cornelia "Cora" Davis of Hitesville, Illinois.

== Career ==
Bland served in the Civil War as a surgeon with the Union Army. Upon his discharge in 1864, he became the editor for the "Home Visitor" a literary weekly published in Indianapolis. His wife Cora, herself a fully trained medical doctor, was the associate editor. In 1865, he established the "Northwestern Farmer", which he sold in 1871. In 1870, Dr. Bland published his first book, "Farming as a Profession". In 1872, the Blands relocated to Chicago, where he took over the editorship of the "Scientific Farmer". In 1872, they moved to New York, where Bland assumed the editorship of the "Farm and Fireside". In 1879, Bland published Life of Benjamin F. Butler. In 1878, the Blands took up permanent residence in Washington, DC, with the intent to devote their lives to politics and literature. During this time period, the Blands met and befriended Colonel Alfred B. Meacham, who was recovering from being nearly fatally shot by Modoc Indians in California a few years earlier. Through this association, the Blands got interested in the Indian cause, dedicating the rest of their lives to combat and to rectify the injustice done to America's indigenous people. The Blands, together with Colonel Meacham, embarked on a lecture tour lasting several years, speaking at hundreds of venues throughout the northeastern United States. Together with Meacham, they published in 1878 "The Council Fire and Arbitrator", a monthly dedicated to the Indian Rights cause until it folded in 1889. The Blands distinguished themselves in their efforts, assisted by fellow Indian Rights activist Caroline Weldon, albeit ultimately unsuccessfully, to fight the implementation of the Allotment Act (Dawes Act) which they deemed unfavorable to the Indians and a blatant attempt by the United States government to dispossess the Indians of much of the land guaranteed to them in numerous treaties.

== Later years and death ==
In 1895, the Blands moved to Boston to continue with various publishing and literary endeavors. In 1898, they relocated to Chicago, where Bland would live out the remainder of his days. He died on 3 January 1908.
