= Corn Creek, South Dakota =

- Unincorporated community
- Location within South Dakota Location within the United States
- Coordinates: 43°33′54″N 101°12′04″W
- Country: United States
- State: South Dakota
- County: Mellette

Area
  - Total: 2.09 sq mi (5.42 km^{2})
  - Land: 2.03 sq mi (5.26 km^{2})
  - Water: 0.062 sq mi (0.16 km^{2})
- Elevation: 2,365 ft (721 m)

Population (2020)
  - Total: 113
  - Density: 56/sq mi (21.5/km^{2})
- Time zone: UTC-6 (Central (CST))
  - Summer (DST): UTC-5 (CDT)
- Area code: 605
- GNIS feature ID: 1266592

Corn Creek is an unincorporated community and census-designated place in Mellette County, South Dakota, United States. Its population was 113 as of the 2020 census. The community is located near the intersection of South Dakota Highway 44 and South Dakota Highway 63.

== Geography ==
According to the United States Census Bureau, the community has an area of 2.103 square miles (5.45 km^{2}); 2.040 square miles (5.28 km^{2}) of its area is land, and 0.063 square miles (0.16 km^{2}) is water.

== Demographics ==
Historical population
Census	Pop.	Note	%±
2020	113		—
U.S. Decennial Census

== Education ==
The community is served by White River School District 47-1.
