= Black Horse Butte Creek =

Stream in South Dakota, U.S.

Coordinates: 45°40′25″N 101°43′00″W

Black Horse Butte Creek is a stream in the U.S. state of South Dakota.

The stream was named after nearby Black Horse Butte.

== See also ==
- List of rivers of South Dakota
