= Dirt Lodge Creek =

Stream in South Dakota, United States

Coordinates: 45°42′39″N 101°25′04″W

Dirt Lodge Creek is a stream in the U.S. state of South Dakota. It was named for an Indian settlement along its course which contained earthen floors.

== See also ==
- List of rivers of South Dakota
