= Morristown, South Dakota =

- Town
- Location in Corson County and the state of South Dakota
- Coordinates: 45°56′19″N 101°43′08″W
- Country: United States
- State: South Dakota
- County: Corson
- Incorporated: 1910

Area
  - Total: 0.35 sq mi (0.91 km^{2})
  - Land: 0.35 sq mi (0.91 km^{2})
  - Water: 0 sq mi (0.00 km^{2})
- Elevation: 2,251 ft (686 m)

Population (2020)
  - Total: 47
  - Density: 134.0/sq mi (51.73/km^{2})
- Time zone: UTC-7 (Mountain (MST))
  - Summer (DST): UTC-6 (MDT)
- ZIP code: 57645
- Area code: 605
- FIPS code: 46-43860
- GNIS feature ID: 1267484

Morristown is a town in Corson County, South Dakota, United States. As of the 2020 census, Morristown had a population of 47.

== History ==
Morristown got its start in 1907 when the railroad was extended to that point. The town was named for Nelson Morris, founder of Morris and Company.

== Geography ==
According to the United States Census Bureau, the town has a total area of 0.35 square miles (0.91 km^{2}), all land.

== Demographics ==
Historical population
Census	Pop.	Note	%±
1910	222		—
1920	269		21.2%
1930	268		−0.4%
1940	217		−19.0%
1950	190		−12.4%
1960	219		15.3%
1970	144		−34.2%
1980	127		−11.8%
1990	64		−49.6%
2000	82		28.1%
2010	67		−18.3%
2020	47		−29.9%
U.S. Decennial Census

=== 2010 census ===
As of the census of 2010, there were 67 people, 32 households, and 18 families residing in the town. The population density was 191.4 inhabitants per square mile (73.9/km^{2}). There were 42 housing units at an average density of 120.0 per square mile (46.3/km^{2}). The racial makeup of the town was 95.5% White and 4.5% Native American.

There were 32 households, of which 31.3% had children under the age of 18 living with them, 40.6% were married couples living together, 6.3% had a female householder with no husband present, 9.4% had a male householder with no wife present, and 43.8% were non-families. 43.8% of all households were made up of individuals, and 18.8% had someone living alone who was 65 years of age or older. The average household size was 2.09 and the average family size was 2.83.

The median age in the town was 37.5 years. 26.9% of residents were under the age of 18; 3% were between the ages of 18 and 24; 26.9% were from 25 to 44; 24% were from 45 to 64; and 19.4% were 65 years of age or older. The gender makeup of the town was 55.2% male and 44.8% female.

=== 2000 census ===
As of the census of 2000, there were 82 people, 32 households, and 24 families residing in the town. The population density was 242.8 inhabitants per square mile (93.7/km^{2}). There were 44 housing units at an average density of 130.3 per square mile (50.3/km^{2}). The racial makeup of the town was 90.24% White, 3.66% Native American, and 6.10% from two or more races. Hispanic or Latino of any race were 1.22% of the population.

There were 32 households, out of which 28.1% had children under the age of 18 living with them, 65.6% were married couples living together, 9.4% had a female householder with no husband present, and 25.0% were non-families. 15.6% of all households were made up of individuals, and 9.4% had someone living alone who was 65 years of age or older. The average household size was 2.56 and the average family size was 2.79.

In the town, the population was spread out, with 26.8% under the age of 18, 9.8% from 18 to 24, 22.0% from 25 to 44, 15.9% from 45 to 64, and 25.6% who were 65 years of age or older. The median age was 36 years. For every 100 females, there were 127.8 males. For every 100 females age 18 and over, there were 122.2 males.

The median income for a household in the town was $20,000, and the median income for a family was $21,875. Males had a median income of $17,083 versus $20,000 for females. The per capita income for the town was $12,017. There were no families and 2.5% of the population living below the poverty line, including no under eighteens and none of those over 64.
