= Belvidere, South Dakota =

- Town
- Location in Jackson County and the state of South Dakota
- Coordinates: 43°49′55″N 101°16′16″W
- Country: United States
- State: South Dakota
- County: Jackson
- Founded: 1907

Area
  - Total: 0.83 sq mi (2.16 km^{2})
  - Land: 0.76 sq mi (1.97 km^{2})
  - Water: 0.073 sq mi (0.19 km^{2})
- Elevation: 2,336 ft (712 m)

Population (2020)
  - Total: 46
  - Density: 60.5/sq mi (23.37/km^{2})
- Time zone: UTC-7 (Mountain (MST))
  - Summer (DST): UTC-6 (MDT)
- ZIP code: 57521
- Area code: 605
- FIPS code: 46-04620
- GNIS feature ID: 1267282

Belvidere is a town in Jackson County, South Dakota, United States. The population was 46 at the 2020 census.

== History ==
A post office called Belvidere has been in operation since 1906. Belvidere was laid out in 1907, and named after Belvidere, Illinois, the native home of a share of the first settlers.

== Geography ==
According to the United States Census Bureau, the town has a total area of 0.83 square miles (2.15 km^{2}), of which 0.76 square miles (1.97 km^{2}) is land and 0.07 square miles (0.18 km^{2}) is water.

Belvidere is located in southern South Dakota near Kadoka and east of Rapid City.

== Demographics ==
Historical population
Census	Pop.	Note	%±
1930	214		—
1940	187		−12.6%
1950	172		−8.0%
1960	232		34.9%
1970	96		−58.6%
1980	80		−16.7%
1990	63		−21.2%
2000	57		−9.5%
2010	49		−14.0%
2020	46		−6.1%
U.S. Decennial Census

=== 2010 census ===
As of the census of 2010, there were 49 people, 23 households, and 12 families residing in the town. The population density was 64.5 inhabitants per square mile (24.9/km^{2}). There were 40 housing units at an average density of 52.6 per square mile (20.3/km^{2}). The racial makeup of the town was 85.7% White and 14.3% Native American. Hispanic or Latino of any race were 2.0% of the population.

There were 23 households, of which 26.1% had children under the age of 18 living with them, 34.8% were married couples living together, 8.7% had a female householder with no husband present, 8.7% had a male householder with no wife present, and 47.8% were non-families. 43.5% of all households were made up of individuals, and 17.4% had someone living alone who was 65 years of age or older. The average household size was 2.13 and the average family size was 3.00.

The median age in the town was 46.5 years. 22.4% of residents were under the age of 18; 6.2% were between the ages of 18 and 24; 18.3% were from 25 to 44; 30.7% were from 45 to 64; and 22.4% were 65 years of age or older. The gender makeup of the town was 51.0% male and 49.0% female.

=== 2000 census ===
As of the census of 2000, there were 57 people, 26 households, and 15 families residing in the town. The population density was 67.4 inhabitants per square mile (26.0/km^{2}). There were 37 housing units at an average density of 43.8 per square mile (16.9/km^{2}). The racial makeup of the town was 82.46% White, and 17.54% Native American, and 0.00% of any other race.

There were 26 households, out of which 26.9% had children under the age of 18 living with them, 42.3% were married couples living together, 15.4% had a female householder with no husband present, and 38.5% were non-families. 38.5% of all households were made up of individuals, and 19.2% had someone living alone who was 65 years of age or older. The average household size was 2.19 and the average family size was 2.94.

In the town, the population was spread out, with 28.1% under the age of 18, 5.3% from 18 to 24, 12.3% from 25 to 44, 33.3% from 45 to 64, and 21.1% who were 65 years of age or older. The median age was 47 years. For every 100 females, there were 83.9 males. For every 100 females age 18 and over, there were 78.3 males.

As of 2000 the median income for a household in the town was $26,250, and the median income for a family was $39,375. Males had a median income of $28,750 versus $13,750 for females. The per capita income for the town was $14,575. 15.9% of the population and 15.8% of families were below the poverty line. 28.6% are under the age of 18. None of those 65 and older were living below the poverty line.

== Notable people ==
- Tom Berry, the 14th Governor of South Dakota.
