= Louse Creek (South Dakota) =

Stream in South Dakota, U.S.

Coordinates: 45°40′59″N 101°27′35″W

Louse Creek is a stream in the U.S. state of South Dakota.

Louse Creek was named for the wood lice which was considered a pest by early settlers.

== See also ==
- List of rivers of South Dakota
