= Mahto, South Dakota =

Unincorporated community in South Dakota, U.S.

Coordinates: 45°45′31″N 100°40′34″W

Mahto is an unincorporated community in Corson County, in the U.S. state of South Dakota.

== History ==
A post office called Mahto was established in 1909, and remained in operation until 1963. Mahto is a name derived from the Sioux language meaning "bear".
