= South Fork Grand River (South Dakota) =

Stream in South Dakota, USA

South Fork Grand River Tributary to Grand River
- Location of South Fork Grand River mouth South Fork Grand River (South Dakota) (the United States)

Location
- Country: United States
- State: South Dakota
- Counties: Perkins; Harding

Physical characteristics
- Source: Buffalo Creek divide
  - location: about 12 miles southwest of Buffalo, South Dakota
  - coordinates: 45°27′14.98″N 103°43′1.72″W
  - elevation: 3,500 ft (1,100 m)
- Mouth: Grand River
  - location: Shadehill Reservoir
  - coordinates: 45°43′29.98″N 102°17′1.57″W
  - elevation: 2,274 ft (693 m)
- Length: 143.15 mi (230.38 km)
- Basin size: 2,283.21 square miles (5,913.5 km^{2})
- Discharge
  - location: Grand River
  - average: 115.36 cu ft/s (3.267 m^{3}/s) at mouth with Grand River

Basin features
- Progression: Grand River → Missouri River → Mississippi River → Gulf of Mexico
- River system: Grand River
- Tributaries
  - left: Big Creek, Little Grand River, Jerry Creek, Pine Spring Creek, Graves Creek, Brush Creek, Rush Creek, Slick Creek, Sheep Creek, Boxelder Creek, Jones Creek, Bull Creek, Coal Creek, Horse Creek, Brush Creek, Skull Creek, Olean Creek, Middle Creek, Big Nasty Creek, Duck Creek, Little Nasty Creek, Lodgepole Creek
  - right: Clarks Fork Creek, Eggland Creek, Prairie Dog Creek, Fisher Creek, Bar H Creek, White Hill Creek, Murphy Creek, Snake Creek, Defenbull Creek, Timber Draw Creek, Box Spring Creek, Butcher Creek
- Bridges: Gilbert-Hett Road, US 85, E6 Road (x2), SD 79, White Hill Road, Divide Road, SD 75, White Butte Road

The South Fork of the Grand River is a tributary of the Grand River, approximately 90 mi (145 km) long, in South Dakota in the United States.

It rises in the Badlands of northwestern South Dakota, south of the Cave Hills in western Harding County, and flows east past Buffalo, then past several units of the Grand River National Grassland in northern Perkins County. It joins the North Fork in the Shadehill Reservoir near to form the Grand, which is a tributary of the Missouri.

== See also ==
- List of rivers of South Dakota
