= Brave Bull Creek =

Stream in South Dakota, U.S.

Coordinates: 43.850312°N 101.246693°W

Brave Bull Creek is a stream in the U.S. state of South Dakota.

Brave Bull Creek has the name of a local Sioux Indian.

== See also ==
- List of rivers of South Dakota
