= Stamford, South Dakota =

Unincorporated community in South Dakota, U.S.

Coordinates: 43°53′42″N 101°05′21″W

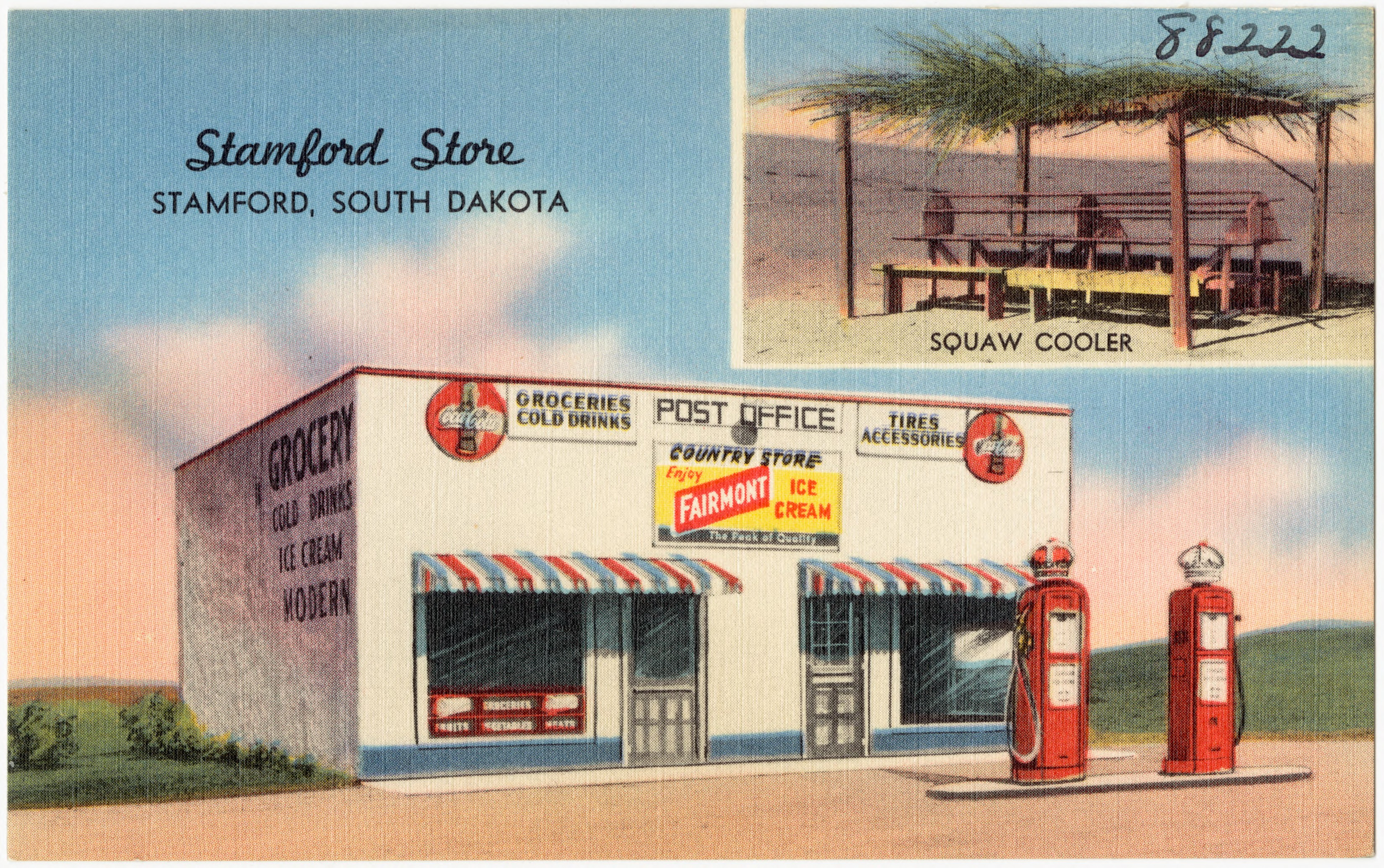
Postcard of Stamford

Stamford is an unincorporated community in Jackson County, in the U.S. state of South Dakota.

== History ==
Stamford was laid out in 1906, and named after Stamford, Connecticut. A post office called Stamford was established in 1907, and remained in operation until 1966.
