= White Shirt Creek =

Stream in South Dakota, U.S.

Coordinates: 45°44′31″N 101°15′04″W

White Shirt Creek is a stream in the U.S. state of South Dakota.

White Shirt Creek has the name of Chief Fred White Shirt, a member of the Sioux tribe.

== See also ==
- List of rivers of South Dakota
