= Hump Butte =

Mountain in South Dakota, United States

Coordinates: 45°53′01″N 101°26′43″W

Hump Butte is a summit in South Dakota, in the United States. With an elevation of 2,431 feet (741 m), Hump Butte is the 453rd highest summit in the state of South Dakota.

Hump Butte was so named on account of its outline being in the shape of buffalo's hump.
