= McLaughlin, South Dakota =

McLaughlin Matȟó Akicita (Lakota)
- City
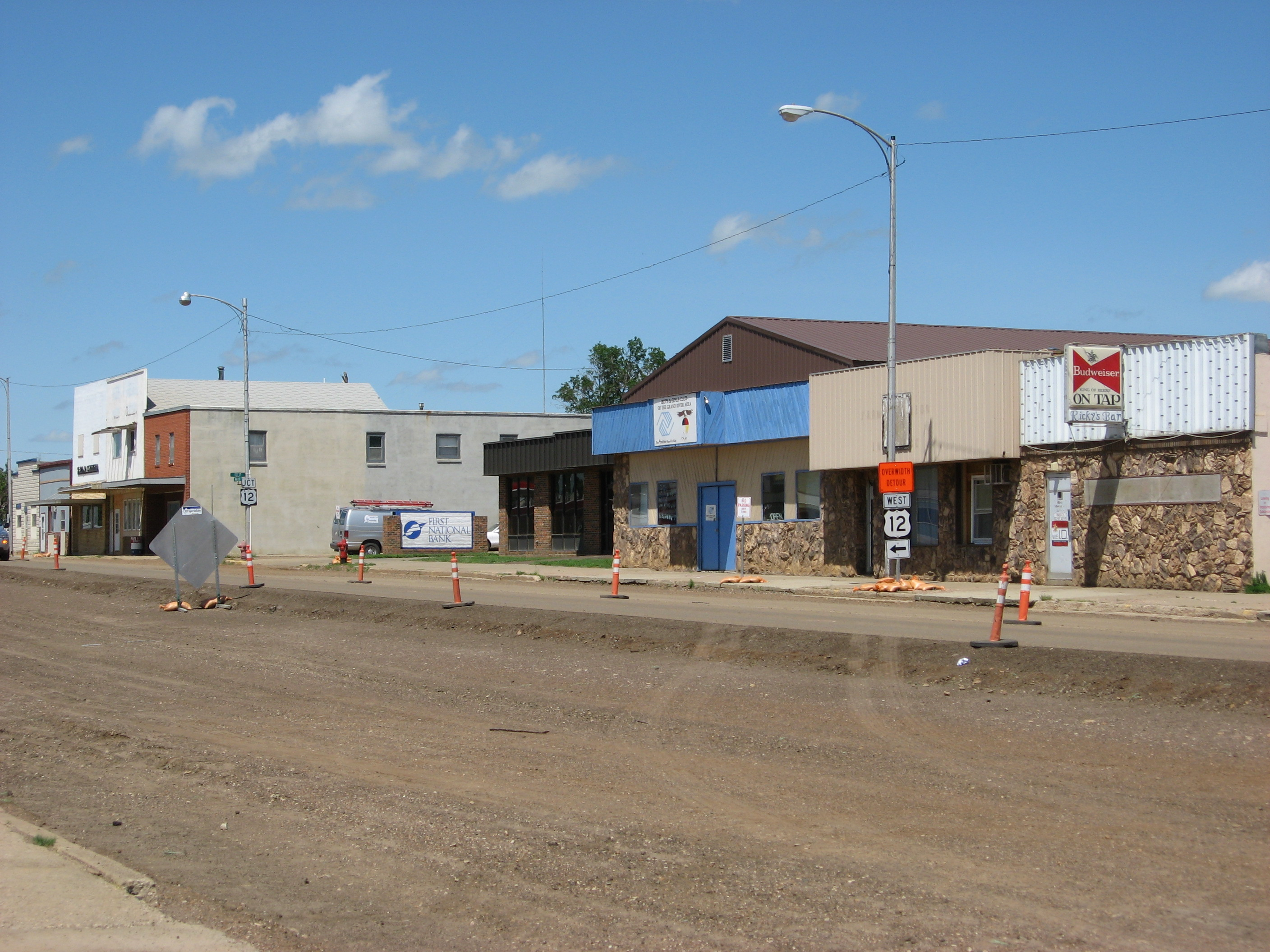
- Main Street in McLaughlin

- Location in Corson County and the state of South Dakota
- Coordinates: 45°48′48″N 100°48′38″W
- Country: United States
- State: South Dakota
- County: Corson
- Incorporated: 1909

Area
  - Total: 0.41 sq mi (1.05 km^{2})
  - Land: 0.41 sq mi (1.05 km^{2})
  - Water: 0 sq mi (0.00 km^{2})
- Elevation: 1,995 ft (608 m)

Population (2020)
  - Total: 569
  - Density: 1,407.4/sq mi (543.39/km^{2})
- Time zone: UTC-7 (Mountain (MST))
  - Summer (DST): UTC-6 (MDT)
- ZIP code: 57642
- Area code: 605
- FIPS code: 46-40020
- GNIS feature ID: 1267468

McLaughlin (Lakota: Matȟó Akíčita or Makáȟleča; "Bear Soldier") is a city in northeastern Corson County, South Dakota, United States. As of the 2020 census, McLaughlin had a population of 569. It is the largest city in the southern Standing Rock Sioux Reservation. Most Lakȟóta speakers refer to the town as Makáȟleča or Matȟó Akíčita.

== History ==
The town is named after a US Indian Service Agent James McLaughlin, who supervised the Standing Rock Indian Agency from 1881 to 1895. He moved to Washington, D.C., where he was Inspector of the Bureau of Indian Affairs and Department of the Interior. After McLaughlin's death in 1923, his body was returned here for burial.

In 2015, the McLaughlin School District changed the name of their school's "Midget" mascot after protests came from Little People of America. The school's basketball coach, an alumnus, drew comparisons to the Native American mascot controversy adding that he "never liked the nickname."

== Geography ==
According to the United States Census Bureau, the city has a total area of 0.40 square miles (1.04 km^{2}), all land.

=== Climate ===
Climate data for McLaughlin, South Dakota (1991−2020 normals, extremes 1919−2020)
| Month | Jan | Feb | Mar | Apr | May | Jun | Jul | Aug | Sep | Oct | Nov | Dec | Year |
|---|---|---|---|---|---|---|---|---|---|---|---|---|---|
| Record high °F (°C) | 66 (19) | 71 (22) | 86 (30) | 98 (37) | 100 (38) | 110 (43) | 112 (44) | 108 (42) | 104 (40) | 94 (34) | 77 (25) | 70 (21) | 112 (44) |
| Mean daily maximum °F (°C) | 24.1 (−4.4) | 28.4 (−2.0) | 41.7 (5.4) | 56.2 (13.4) | 68.1 (20.1) | 78.4 (25.8) | 85.4 (29.7) | 83.9 (28.8) | 73.6 (23.1) | 57.4 (14.1) | 41.1 (5.1) | 28.5 (−1.9) | 55.6 (13.1) |
| Daily mean °F (°C) | 13.8 (−10.1) | 17.6 (−8.0) | 30.2 (−1.0) | 42.9 (6.1) | 55.0 (12.8) | 65.6 (18.7) | 71.7 (22.1) | 69.6 (20.9) | 59.5 (15.3) | 44.6 (7.0) | 29.9 (−1.2) | 18.6 (−7.4) | 43.2 (6.2) |
| Mean daily minimum °F (°C) | 3.6 (−15.8) | 6.7 (−14.1) | 18.6 (−7.4) | 29.7 (−1.3) | 41.9 (5.5) | 52.7 (11.5) | 58.0 (14.4) | 55.2 (12.9) | 45.3 (7.4) | 31.8 (−0.1) | 18.8 (−7.3) | 8.6 (−13.0) | 30.9 (−0.6) |
| Record low °F (°C) | −37 (−38) | −37 (−38) | −25 (−32) | −4 (−20) | 15 (−9) | 27 (−3) | 37 (3) | 34 (1) | 16 (−9) | −6 (−21) | −25 (−32) | −35 (−37) | −37 (−38) |
| Average precipitation inches (mm) | 0.50 (13) | 0.49 (12) | 0.94 (24) | 1.69 (43) | 3.17 (81) | 3.34 (85) | 3.03 (77) | 2.47 (63) | 1.45 (37) | 1.77 (45) | 0.65 (17) | 0.58 (15) | 20.08 (510) |
| Average snowfall inches (cm) | 7.5 (19) | 6.5 (17) | 3.7 (9.4) | 2.1 (5.3) | 0.2 (0.51) | 0.0 (0.0) | 0.0 (0.0) | 0.0 (0.0) | 0.0 (0.0) | 0.7 (1.8) | 4.0 (10) | 10.2 (26) | 34.9 (89) |
| Average precipitation days (≥ 0.01 in) | 3.4 | 4.1 | 4.4 | 6.1 | 8.7 | 9.5 | 7.7 | 5.8 | 4.5 | 4.3 | 2.7 | 3.7 | 64.9 |
| Average snowy days (≥ 0.1 in) | 1.8 | 2.0 | 0.9 | 0.5 | 0.1 | 0.0 | 0.0 | 0.0 | 0.0 | 0.3 | 0.7 | 1.8 | 8.1 |
Source: NOAA

== Demographics ==
Historical population
| Census | Pop. | Note | %± |
|---|---|---|---|
| 1920 | 555 | | — |
| 1930 | 678 | | 22.2% |
| 1940 | 660 | | −2.7% |
| 1950 | 713 | | 8.0% |
| 1960 | 983 | | 37.9% |
| 1970 | 863 | | −12.2% |
| 1980 | 754 | | −12.6% |
| 1990 | 780 | | 3.4% |
| 2000 | 775 | | −0.6% |
| 2010 | 663 | | −14.5% |
| 2020 | 569 | | −14.2% |
U.S. Decennial Census

=== 2020 census ===
As of the 2020 census, McLaughlin had a population of 569. The median age was 34.1 years. 27.9% of residents were under the age of 18 and 14.8% of residents were 65 years of age or older. For every 100 females there were 92.9 males, and for every 100 females age 18 and over there were 104.0 males age 18 and over.

0.0% of residents lived in urban areas, while 100.0% lived in rural areas.

There were 196 households in McLaughlin, of which 35.2% had children under the age of 18 living in them. Of all households, 32.7% were married-couple households, 29.6% were households with a male householder and no spouse or partner present, and 28.1% were households with a female householder and no spouse or partner present. About 34.7% of all households were made up of individuals and 11.8% had someone living alone who was 65 years of age or older.

There were 226 housing units, of which 13.3% were vacant. The homeowner vacancy rate was 0.0% and the rental vacancy rate was 6.8%.

Racial composition as of the 2020 census
| Race | Number | Percent |
|---|---|---|
| White | 127 | 22.3% |
| Black or African American | 2 | 0.4% |
| American Indian and Alaska Native | 401 | 70.5% |
| Asian | 8 | 1.4% |
| Native Hawaiian and Other Pacific Islander | 0 | 0.0% |
| Some other race | 0 | 0.0% |
| Two or more races | 31 | 5.4% |
| Hispanic or Latino (of any race) | 7 | 1.2% |

=== 2010 census ===
At the 2010 census, there were 663 people, 233 households and 154 families residing in the city. The population density was 1,657.5 per square mile (640.0/km^{2}). There were 270 housing units at an average density of 675.0 per square mile (260.6/km^{2}). The racial makeup of the city was 28.1% White, 65.3% Native American, 0.9% Asian, 0.2% Pacific Islander, 1.1% from other races, and 4.5% from two or more races. Hispanic or Latino of any race were 3.8% of the population.

There were 233 households, of which 43.8% had children under the age of 18 living with them, 33.9% were married couples living together, 21.9% had a female householder with no husband present, 10.3% had a male householder with no wife present, and 33.9% were non-families. 29.2% of all households were made up of individuals, and 9% had someone living alone who was 65 years of age or older. The average household size was 2.84 and the average family size was 3.54.

The median age was 31 years. 31.8% of residents were under the age of 18; 10.7% were between the ages of 18 and 24; 21.6% were from 25 to 44; 24.2% were from 45 to 64; and 11.8% were 65 years of age or older. The gender makeup of the city was 49.2% male and 50.8% female.

=== 2000 census ===
At the 2000 census, there were 775 people, 268 households and 181 families residing in the city. The population density was 1,835.1 inhabitants per square mile (708.5/km^{2}). There were 291 housing units at an average density of 689.1 per square mile (266.1/km^{2}). The racial makeup of the city was 41.29% White, 0.13% African American, 55.74% Native American, 0.13% from other races, and 2.71% from two or more races. Hispanic or Latino of any race were 4.77% of the population.

There were 268 households, of which 33.6% had children under the age of 18 living with them, 40.7% were married couples living together, 20.9% had a female householder with no husband present, and 32.1% were non-families. 27.6% of all households were made up of individuals, and 11.9% had someone living alone who was 65 years of age or older. The average household size was 2.89 and the average family size was 3.48.

33.3% of the population were under the age of 18, 9.7% from 18 to 24, 25.9% from 25 to 44, 18.5% from 45 to 64, and 12.6% who were 65 years of age or older. The median age was 30 years. For every 100 females, there were 93.3 males. For every 100 females age 18 and over, there were 86.0 males.

The median household income was $22,500 and the median family income was $31,111. Males had a median income of $22,500 and females $18,229. The per capita income was $10,682. About 15.8% of families and 25.8% of the population were below the poverty line, including 34.8% of those under age 18 and 30.0% of those age 65 or over.

== See also ==
- List of towns in South Dakota
