= Black Horse Butte =

Mountain in South Dakota, United States

Coordinates: 45°37′09″N 101°53′03″W

Black Horse Butte is a summit in South Dakota, in the United States. With an elevation of 2,628 feet (801 m), Black Horse Butte is the 414th highest summit in the state of South Dakota.

Black Horse Butte's name comes from the Sioux Indians of the area, who frequently saw a wild black horse near the mountain.
