= Firesteel, South Dakota =

Unincorporated community in South Dakota, United States

Firesteel, South Dakota Čhaȟlíok'e Otȟúŋwahe
- Unincorporated community
- Location of Firesteel in South Dakota Firesteel (the United States)
- Coordinates: 45°25′29″N 101°17′07″W
- Country: United States
- Indian Reservation: Cheyenne River Indian Reservation
- State: South Dakota
- County: Dewey
- Founded: May 1910
- Named for: Firesteel Creek
- Elevation: 2,352 ft (717 m)
- Time zone: UTC-7 (Mountain Time Zone (MST))
  - Summer (DST): UTC-6 (MDT)
- ZIP code: 57633
- Area code: 605
- GNIS feature ID: 1255047

Firesteel (Lakota: Čhaȟlíok'e Otȟúŋwahe) is an unincorporated community on the Cheyenne River Indian Reservation, in Dewey County, South Dakota, United States. It was known for being a prominent coal mining community in the early 1900s. It is not tracked by the U.S. Census Bureau.

== Naming ==
Firesteel was named for nearby Firesteel Creek. The name Firesteel came from the English translation for the Lakota name for the creek. The Lakota named the creek for the flint found on its banks, which they struck against a piece of steel to make fire.

== History ==
=== Founding and settlement ===
Firesteel was founded in May 1910 as the Firesteel Station. Settlers began traveling to the area after rumors of a new township founded over one section began to spread. However, no such township was actually reserved. A post office was founded in February 1911. Businesses began to spring up. The first lots went for sale on September 4, 1912, with the highest lot selling for $250.

=== Mining and boom years ===
Firesteel was the only coal mining community in South Dakota. The first coal was found in 1907 or 1908 by W. Benoist and A. Traversie in a prairie dog town. A commercial coal mine was opened in 1911. Because of the expensive cost of a railroad, the mine was locally operated until World War I, when the railroad costs dropped and wider markets opened. In 1929, a new dragline was purchased by Firesteel Coal Company, and mechanical stripping was made possible. In 1933, the State Relief Agency opened a new mine about 3/4 of a mile southwest of the town to provide more fuel for people struggling through the Great Depression. However, this mine closed on March 17, 1934, when the government realized that purchasing coal was cheaper than mining it. Runkel Coal was founded by L. P. Runkel in 1935. The company's peak years were May 1941 to April 1942, when 51,743 tons of coal were sold. During this time, 30 truckers were paid 35 cents per ton to load and haul the coal from pits to the railcars. In 1947, Ben Dollarhide bought out the Runkel Company and formed the Dewey County Coal Company. Dollarhide added a large tipple to speed loading. In one day, 552 tons of coal were pushed through the tipple.

From the 1910s to the 1930s, Firesteel was an important trade hub. At one point, Firesteel included a flour mill, a bank, several businesses, a school, a 24-hour electricity plant, 70 miles of telephone lines, and a stockyard. This stockyard turned Firesteel into an important livestock shipping point.

=== Decline and today ===
With the introduction of new mining technology, fewer workers were required for the mine, and the town began its decline as miners left to find work. A series of fires destroyed businesses. The mine closed in 1968, and the school closed sometime that same decade.

Today, most locals are farmers or ranchers. A marker was placed on the townsite in 1991 by the Dewey County Historical Society, which tells the town's history. A bucket from the last dragline, the Monighan, is on display next to the marker. To the west of the town, spoil banks are still visible. Though there is still a small agricultural population, the main town is largely abandoned, and it is often considered a ghost town.

== Geography ==
Firesteel is located in Dewey County. Its coordinates are 45.4247065°N 101.2851477°W. It has an elevation of 2,352 feet (717 m).

=== Climate ===
Climate data for Firesteel, South Dakota
Month	Jan	Feb	Mar	Apr	May	Jun	Jul	Aug	Sep	Oct	Nov	Dec	Year
Record high °F (°C)	66 (19)	70 (21)	80 (27)	95 (35)	100 (38)	108 (42)	112 (44)	107 (42)	105 (41)	94 (34)	77 (25)	70 (21)	112 (44)
Mean daily maximum °F (°C)	28 (−2)	33 (1)	43 (6)	59 (15)	70 (21)	79 (26)	86 (30)	85 (29)	75 (24)	59 (15)	42 (6)	30 (−1)	57 (14)
Daily mean °F (°C)	18 (−8)	23 (−5)	33 (1)	46 (8)	57 (14)	67 (19)	73 (23)	72 (22)	61 (16)	47 (8)	32 (0)	20 (−7)	46 (8)
Mean daily minimum °F (°C)	8 (−13)	12 (−11)	22 (−6)	33 (1)	44 (7)	54 (12)	60 (16)	58 (14)	47 (8)	35 (2)	21 (−6)	10 (−12)	34 (1)
Record low °F (°C)	−36 (−38)	−35 (−37)	−25 (−32)	−1 (−18)	16 (−9)	32 (0)	39 (4)	35 (2)	19 (−7)	−6 (−21)	−20 (−29)	−34 (−37)	−36 (−38)
Average precipitation inches (mm)	0.43 (11)	0.62 (16)	1.15 (29)	1.70 (43)	2.84 (72)	3.30 (84)	2.62 (67)	1.71 (43)	1.44 (37)	1.56 (40)	0.61 (15)	0.48 (12)	18.46 (469)
Source: The Weather Channel (Historical Monthly Averages)
