= Trail City, South Dakota =

- Unincorporated community
- Location within the state of South Dakota Trail City (the United States)
- Coordinates: 45°28′21″N 100°43′32″W
- Country: United States
- State: South Dakota
- County: Corson
- Elevation: 2,142 ft (653 m)
- Time zone: UTC-6 (Central (CST))
  - Summer (DST): UTC-5 (CDT)
- ZIP codes: 57657
- GNIS feature ID: 1258590

Trail City is an unincorporated community straddling Dewey County, South Dakota and Corson County, South Dakota, United States. Although not tracked by the Census Bureau, Trail City has been assigned the ZIP code of 57657.

The community was originally named Cheyenne Junction upon establishment in 1911, a reference to its location at the junction of two branches of the railroad. Due to confusion in the mails with two other South Dakota post offices (Cheyenne Agency and Cheyenne Falls), alternate town names were considered. Among the candidate town names were Rodero, Prairie, and Trail City; the latter chosen in 1912 because of the many indigenous trails that crossed in the vicinity.

The community was named for a cattle drive trail near the original town site according to some secondary sources.
