= Moreau River (South Dakota) =

Stream in South Dakota, USA

Moreau River Tributary to Missouri River
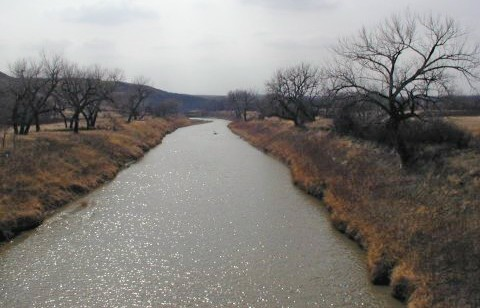
- The Moreau River at Whitehorse

- Location of Moreau River mouth Moreau River (South Dakota) (the United States)
- Native name: Hiŋháŋ Wakpá (Lakota)

Location
- Country: United States
- State: South Dakota
- Counties: Dewey; Edmunds; Ziebach; Perkins

Physical characteristics
- Source: confluence of South and North Fork of Moreau River
  - location: about 4 miles east-northeast of the intersection 156th Street and Zeona Road
  - coordinates: 45°08′40″N 102°50′21″W
  - elevation: 2,490 ft (760 m)
- Mouth: Missouri River
  - location: about 10 miles west of Akaska, South Dakota
  - coordinates: 45°19′29″N 100°19′59″W
  - elevation: 1,614 ft (492 m)
- Length: 290.75 mi (467.92 km)
- Basin size: 5,435.32 square miles (14,077.4 km^{2})
- Discharge
  - location: Missouri River
  - average: 337.63 cu ft/s (9.561 m^{3}/s) at mouth with Missouri River

Basin features
- Progression: Missouri River → Mississippi River → Gulf of Mexico
- River system: Missouri River
- Tributaries
  - left: North Fork Moreau River, Ash Creek, Mud Creek, Cottonwood Creek, Brady Creek, Cabin Creek, Starve Out Creek, Rabbit Creek, Mud Creek, Berry Creek, Locate Creek, Thunder Butte Creek, Sophia Creek, Irish Creek, Red Earth Creek, Meadow Creek, Redwater Creek, Little Moreau River, Whitehorse Creek, Jewett Creek, Jolley Creek, Handbou Creek, Marshall Creek, Du Charme Creek, Tom Hill Creek, Laundreaux Creek, Le Beau Creek, Chicken Creek
  - right: Big Cabin Creek, Little Cedar Creek, Deep Creek, Badlands Creek, Flint Rock Creek, Knife Creek, Cottonwood Creek, Ash Creek, Pretty Creek, Bear Creek, Green Grass Creek, Gorge Creek, Cottonwood Creek, Bull Creek, Swan Creek, Johnson Creek, Blue Beaver Creek, Virian Creek, Beaver Creek, Hakshela Creek, No Mouth Creek
- Bridges: Cedar Canyon Road, Bixby Road, SD 73, unnamed road, Thunder Butte Road, Leadum Pike Road, unnamed road (x4), SD 65, On the Tree Road, SD 63, unnamed road, BIA-3, The Native American Scenic Byway

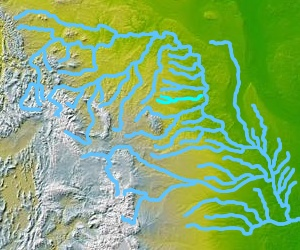
The Moreau River, highlighted on a map of the Missouri River watershed

The Moreau River (Lakota: Hiŋháŋ Wakpá) a tributary of the Missouri River, approximately 200 miles (320 km) long, in South Dakota in the United States. Moreau River has the name of a pioneer trader.

It rises in two forks in northwestern South Dakota, in the Badlands of Butte and Harding Counties. The North Fork rises approximately 10 miles (16 km) northeast of Crow Buttes. The South Fork rises approximately 20 miles (32 km) west of the headwaters of the North Fork. The two forks flow ESE and unite near Zeona in southern Perkins County. The combined stream flows east, past Usta, and across the Cheyenne River Indian Reservation, past Iron Lightning, Thunder Butte, Green Grass and Whitehorse. It joins the Missouri in Lake Oahe, with the lower 25 miles (40 km) of the river forming an arm of the reservoir.

The river generally parallels its neighbor 40 miles (64 km) to the north, the Grand River, running from west to east to join the Missouri. Draining the Pierre Hills and Northern Plateaus, the Moreau (formerly Owl River) has a drainage basin of approximately 5,400 square miles (14,000 km^{2}). The Moreau River also has Sand Creek as a source, along with the North and South Forks, and claims several tributaries, such as the Little Moreau, Deep, Red Earth, Antelope, and Thunder Butte Rivers. At Promise, the river averages a flow of 296 cubic feet per second (8.4 cubic metres per second).

== Variant names ==
According to the Geographic Names Information System, it has also been known historically as:

- Big Owl River
- Cerwercerna River
- Hinyankaga
- Main Owl River
- Mistai'yohe
- Murow Creek
- Owl River
- Sur war har na ha River

== See also ==
- List of rivers of South Dakota
