= National Register of Historic Places listings in Dewey County, South Dakota =

Location of Dewey County in South Dakota

This is a list of the National Register of Historic Places listings in Dewey County, South Dakota.

This is intended to be a complete list of the properties and districts on the National Register of Historic Places in Dewey County, South Dakota, United States. The locations of National Register properties and districts for which the latitude and longitude coordinates are included below, may be seen in a map.

There are 5 properties and districts listed on the National Register in the county, including 1 National Historic Landmark.

This National Park Service list is complete through NPS recent listings posted March 21, 2025.

== Current listings ==
	Name on the Register	Image	Date listed	Location	City or town	Description
1	Dakota Club Library	Dakota Club Library	May 19, 2004 (#04000474)	Lot 4 Block 3 Main St. 44°59′55″N 101°14′07″W	Eagle Butte	
2	Drees Brothers General Merchandise		May 8, 1998 (#98000445)	812 Main St. 45°25′48″N 101°04′24″W	Timber Lake	
3	Forest City Bridge	Forest City Bridge	November 8, 2001 (#01001217)	U.S. Trunk Route 212; 45°00′53″N 100°17′39″W	La Plant	
4	Laurens Polygonal Hog House	Laurens Polygonal Hog House	December 14, 1995 (#95001468)	Highway 63, 1 mile north of U.S. Route 212; 45°01′43″N 101°09′19″W	Eagle Butte	
5	Molstad Village	Molstad Village	October 15, 1966 (#66000713)	Western side of the Missouri River, 6 miles (9.7 km) southeast of Mobridge; 45°27′25″N 100°21′15″W	Mobridge	

== See also ==
- List of National Historic Landmarks in South Dakota
- National Register of Historic Places listings in South Dakota
