= Swift Bird, South Dakota =

- Census-designated place
- Location within South Dakota Location within the United States
- Coordinates: 45°03′36″N 100°21′16″W
- Country: United States
- State: South Dakota
- County: Dewey

Area
  - Total: 0.49 sq mi (1.27 km^{2})
  - Land: 0.49 sq mi (1.27 km^{2})
  - Water: 0 sq mi (0.00 km^{2})
- Elevation: 1,834 ft (559 m)

Population (2020)
  - Total: 117
  - Density: 238.5/sq mi (92.09/km^{2})
- Time zone: UTC-7 (Mountain (MST))
  - Summer (DST): UTC-6 (MDT)
- ZIP Code: 57442 (Gettysburg)
- Area code: 605
- FIPS code: 46-62716
- GNIS feature ID: 2813016

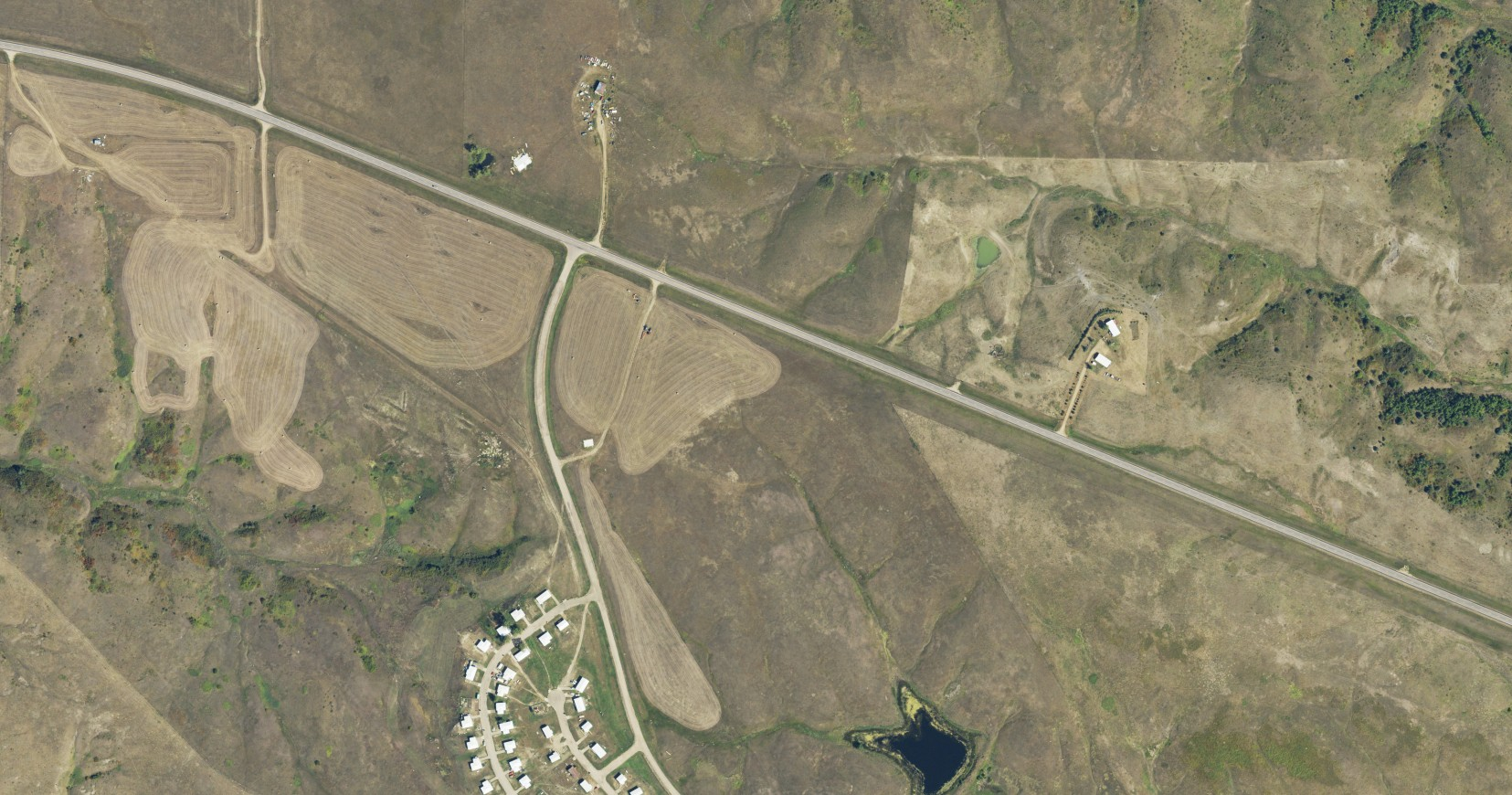
Aerial photograph of Swift Bird, South Dakota.

Swift Bird (Lakota: Ziŋtkála Kiŋyáŋ) is a census-designated place (CDP) on the Cheyenne River Indian Reservation in Dewey County, South Dakota, United States. It was first listed as a CDP prior to the 2020 census.

== Geography ==
It is in the eastern part of the county, on the south side of U.S. Route 212, 4 miles (6 km) northwest of the highway's bridge over Lake Oahe on the Missouri River. It is 4 miles (6 km) south of Swift Bird Bay on Lake Oahe, fed from the west by Swift Bird Creek. The community is 23 miles (37 km) west of Gettysburg and 48 miles (77 km) east of Eagle Butte.

== Demographics ==
=== Population and housing ===
As of the 2020 United States census, Swift Bird had a population of 117 and 34 housing units. According to the 2020 American Community Survey estimates, the median age in Swift Bird was 16.0 years.

=== Race and ethnicity ===
Located entirely within the Cheyenne River Indian Reservation, the community's racial makeup during the 2020 census was predominantly Native American, accounting for 115 residents. The remainder of the population consisted of 1 African American resident and 1 resident identifying with two or more races.

=== Economy ===
According to the 2020 American Community Survey 5-year estimates, the per capita income in Swift Bird was $5,867. Approximately 57.4% of the civilian labor force was unemployed, and 93.2% of the population lived below the poverty line.

== Government ==
As a census-designated place, Swift Bird does not have its own municipal government. Because the community is located entirely within the Cheyenne River Indian Reservation, it operates primarily under the jurisdiction of the Cheyenne River Sioux Tribe. For state administrative purposes, Swift Bird is located within Dewey County and is subject to the county's overlapping jurisdiction.

At the state level, Swift Bird is represented in the South Dakota State Legislature within Senate District 28 and House District 28A. At the federal level, the community is represented in the United States House of Representatives by South Dakota's at-large congressional district.
