= 2018 South Dakota Commissioner of School and Public Lands election =

- November 6, 2018
Nominee	Ryan Brunner	Woody Houser
Party	Republican	Democratic
Popular vote	193,434	116,786
Percentage	62.35%	37.65%
- County results Brunner: 50–60% 60–70% 70–80% 80–90% >90% Houser: 50–60% 60–70% 70–80% 90–100%
Commissioner of School and Public Lands before election
Ryan Brunner
Republican
Elected Commissioner of School and Public Lands
Ryan Brunner
Republican

The 2018 South Dakota Commissioner of School and Public Lands election was held on November 6, 2018, to elect the commissioner of school and public lands of South Dakota. Incumbent Republican Ryan Brunner was re-elected to a second term in office, defeating Democratic challenger Woody Houser in a landslide.

== Republican primary ==
=== Candidates ===
==== Nominee ====
- Ryan Brunner, incumbent commissioner of school and public lands (2015–2022)

== Democratic primary ==
=== Candidates ===
==== Nominee ====
- Woody Houser, real estate agent

== General election ==
=== Results ===
2018 South Dakota Commissioner of School and Public Lands election
Party	Candidate	Votes	%
Republican	Ryan Brunner (incumbent)	193,434	62.35%
Democratic	Woody Houser	116,786	37.65%
Total votes		310,220	100.00%
Republican hold			

==== By county ====
County	Ryan Brunner Republican		Woody Houser Democratic		Margin		Total
County	#	%	#	%	#	%	Total
Aurora	734	64.05%	412	35.95%	322	28.10%	1,146
Beadle	3,548	64.14%	1,984	35.86%	1,564	28.27%	5,532
Bennett	568	54.88%	467	45.12%	101	9.76%	1,035
Bon Homme	1,606	65.71%	838	34.29%	768	31.42%	2,444
Brookings	6,577	60.71%	4,257	39.29%	2,320	21.41%	10,834
Brown	7,721	58.78%	5,415	41.22%	2,306	17.55%	13,136
Brule	1,286	67.12%	630	32.88%	656	34.24%	1,916
Buffalo	148	29.25%	358	70.75%	-210	-41.50%	506
Butte	2,953	79.92%	742	20.08%	2,211	59.84%	3,695
Campbell	597	86.15%	96	13.85%	501	72.29%	693
Charles Mix	2,019	61.24%	1,278	38.76%	741	22.47%	3,297
Clark	1,005	67.40%	486	32.60%	519	34.81%	1,491
Clay	1,906	44.48%	2,379	55.52%	-473	-11.04%	4,285
Codington	6,213	66.13%	3,182	33.87%	3,031	32.26%	9,395
Corson	470	44.09%	596	55.91%	-126	-11.82%	1,066
Custer	3,009	71.56%	1,196	28.44%	1,813	43.12%	4,205
Davison	4,304	65.96%	2,221	34.04%	2,083	31.92%	6,525
Day	1,345	55.12%	1,095	44.88%	250	10.25%	2,440
Deuel	1,166	65.62%	611	34.38%	555	31.23%	1,777
Dewey	578	33.39%	1,153	66.61%	-575	-33.22%	1,731
Douglas	1,186	85.51%	201	14.49%	985	71.02%	1,387
Edmunds	1,078	70.23%	457	29.77%	621	40.46%	1,535
Fall River	2,143	70.40%	901	29.60%	1,242	40.80%	3,044
Faulk	760	77.24%	224	22.76%	536	54.47%	984
Grant	1,945	67.00%	958	33.00%	987	34.00%	2,903
Gregory	1,339	69.02%	601	30.98%	738	38.04%	1,940
Haakon	804	89.73%	92	10.27%	712	79.46%	896
Hamlin	1,865	75.41%	608	24.59%	1,257	50.83%	2,473
Hand	1,096	71.54%	436	28.46%	660	43.08%	1,532
Hanson	997	69.14%	445	30.86%	552	38.28%	1,442
Harding	606	90.58%	63	9.42%	543	81.17%	669
Hughes	5,304	71.08%	2,158	28.92%	3,146	42.16%	7,462
Hutchinson	2,253	75.50%	731	24.50%	1,522	51.01%	2,984
Hyde	456	72.61%	172	27.39%	284	45.22%	628
Jackson	580	61.51%	363	38.49%	217	23.01%	943
Jerauld	522	62.74%	310	37.26%	212	25.48%	832
Jones	414	82.80%	86	17.20%	328	65.60%	500
Kingsbury	1,507	67.76%	717	32.24%	790	35.52%	2,224
Lake	2,953	62.75%	1,753	37.25%	1,200	25.50%	4,706
Lawrence	6,787	65.81%	3,526	34.19%	3,261	31.62%	10,313
Lincoln	14,148	64.35%	7,838	35.65%	6,310	28.70%	21,986
Lyman	836	65.11%	448	34.89%	388	30.22%	1,284
Marshall	940	53.26%	825	46.74%	115	6.52%	1,765
McCook	1,509	67.88%	714	32.12%	795	35.76%	2,223
McPherson	810	81.00%	190	19.00%	620	62.00%	1,000
Meade	7,223	74.67%	2,450	25.33%	4,773	49.34%	9,673
Mellette	351	53.51%	305	46.49%	46	7.01%	656
Miner	594	62.99%	349	37.01%	245	25.98%	943
Minnehaha	35,115	55.57%	28,071	44.43%	7,044	11.15%	63,186
Moody	1,485	57.03%	1,119	42.97%	366	14.06%	2,604
Oglala Lakota	250	8.51%	2,688	91.49%	-2,438	-82.98%	2,938
Pennington	24,812	64.01%	13,950	35.99%	10,862	28.02%	38,762
Perkins	1,021	81.03%	239	18.97%	782	62.06%	1,260
Potter	907	82.38%	194	17.62%	713	64.76%	1,101
Roberts	1,712	50.34%	1,689	49.66%	23	0.68%	3,401
Sanborn	649	71.95%	253	28.05%	396	43.90%	902
Spink	1,577	60.77%	1,018	39.23%	559	21.54%	2,595
Stanley	1,014	73.32%	369	26.68%	645	46.64%	1,383
Sully	595	78.19%	166	21.81%	429	56.37%	761
Todd	460	21.68%	1,662	78.32%	-1,202	-56.64%	2,122
Tripp	1,714	74.85%	576	25.15%	1,138	49.69%	2,290
Turner	2,414	68.31%	1,120	31.69%	1,294	36.62%	3,534
Union	4,330	67.76%	2,060	32.24%	2,270	35.52%	6,390
Walworth	1,609	76.18%	503	23.82%	1,106	52.37%	2,112
Yankton	4,695	58.38%	3,347	41.62%	1,348	16.76%	8,042
Ziebach	316	41.52%	445	58.48%	-129	-16.95%	761
Totals	193,434	62.35%	116,786	37.65%	76,648	24.71%	310,220

Counties that flipped from Republican to Democratic

- Corson (largest city: McLaughlin)
- Dewey (largest city: North Eagle Butte)
- Ziebach (largest city: Dupree)
- Clay (largest city: Vermillion)

Counties that flipped from Libertarian to Democratic

- Buffalo (largest city: Fort Thompson)
- Oglala Lakota (largest city: Pine Ridge)
- Todd (largest city: Mission)
