= Laurens Polygonal Hog House =

- U.S. National Register of Historic Places
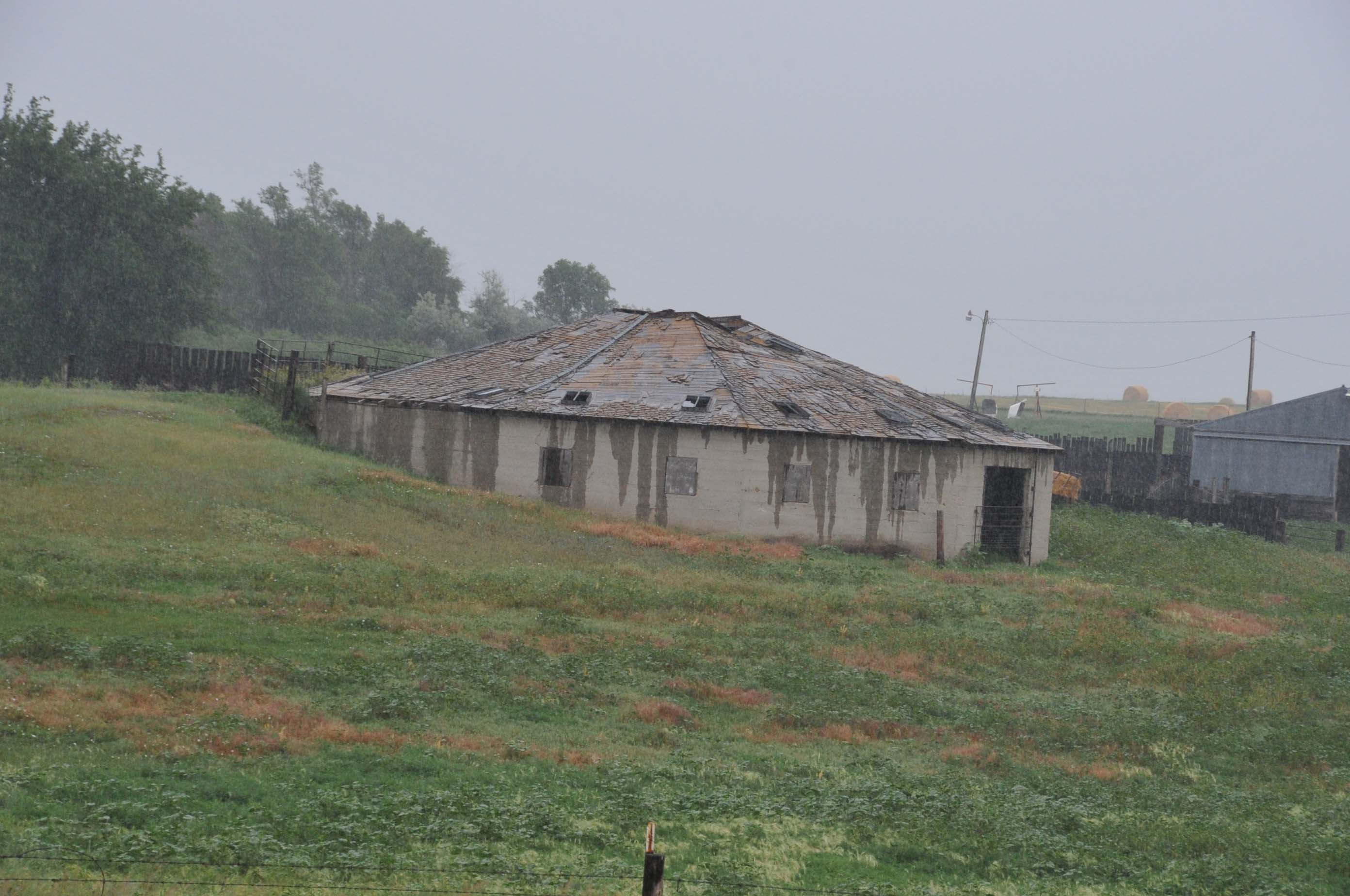

- Location within South Dakota Location within the United States
- Nearest city: Eagle Butte, South Dakota
- Coordinates: 45°1′43″N 101°9′19″W
- Area: less than one acre
- Built: 1928
- Built by: August and Frank Laurenz
- Architectural style: Polygonal Hog House
- MPS: South Dakota's Round and Polygonal Barns and Pavilions MPS
- NRHP reference No.: 95001468
- Added to NRHP: December 14, 1995

The Laurens Polygonal Hog House is a historic farm outbuilding in Dewey County, South Dakota. It is located northeast of Eagle Butte, on the east side of South Dakota Highway 63, about 1 mile (1.6 km) north of its junction with United States Route 212. It is a 10-side structure, with walls and foundation of concrete and stone, and a conical wood frame roof with low pitch, and is partially set into a sloping hillside. It has a single entrance and four windows. The interior is organized with wedge-shaped pens on the outside of a central open area, from which feed and water can be distributed efficiently to the pens. The structure was built in 1926-28 by August and Frank Laurenz, and was used as a hog house until 1956. It has since seen a variety of other agricultural uses.

The building was listed on the National Register of Historic Places in 1995.

== See also ==
- National Register of Historic Places listings in Dewey County, South Dakota
