= Molstad Village =

Historic place in South Dakota, United States

- U.S. National Register of Historic Places
- U.S. National Historic Landmark
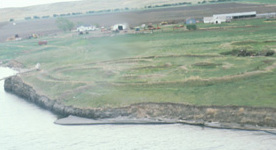
- Aerial view of the site

- Location within South Dakota Location within the United States
- Location: Western side of the Missouri River, 6 miles (9.7 km) southeast of Mobridge, South Dakota
- Coordinates: 45°27′25″N 100°21′15″W
- Area: 9.9 acres (4.0 ha)
- NRHP reference No.: 66000713

Significant dates
- Added to NRHP: October 15, 1966
- Designated NHL: July 19, 1964

Molstad Village, designated by the Smithsonian trinomial 39DW234, is an archaeological site in Dewey County, South Dakota, United States, near the city of Mobridge. It was declared a National Historic Landmark in 1964. The site contains the remains of a small fortified Native America village, consisting of earth lodges surrounded by a bastioned palisade, with further lodges scattered in the area outside the fortification. Evidence gathered at the site indicates it was occupied for a relatively brief period in the mid-1500s CE, and was assigned to the Chouteau aspect of Middle Missouri taxonomy, later known as the Extended Coalescent phase. Four lodge sites were excavated in the early 1960s, uncovering post holes and cache pits, one of which contained skull-less human remains. Finds at the site included pottery fragments and stone tools. Bone tools were also found, including plows made from bison shoulder blades.

Molstad Village was named after Irene and Oscar Molstad, on whose ranch the village was found. The land belonged to Irene Molstad, a member of the federally recognized Cheyenne River Sioux Nation. She and her husband Oscar operated a cattle ranch, and allowed Smithsonian Institution researches to camp on their land while investing archaeological sites in the area in advance of the creation of Lake Oahe. The Molstad village site was excavated by this team in 1962 under the direction of J. Jake Hoffman. Finds at the site were important in enabling Hoffman to use pottery styles to establish a chronology of regional sites.

== See also ==
- List of National Historic Landmarks in South Dakota
- National Register of Historic Places listings in Dewey County, South Dakota
