= Cherry Creek (South Dakota) =

Tributary of the Cheyenne River

Coordinates: 44.33830°N 100.22790°W

Cherry Creek is a tributary of the Cheyenne River, approximately 50 mi (80 km), in central South Dakota in the United States.

Cherry Creek was so named on account of the cherry trees along its course.

It rises in the prairie country of northern Meade County, and flows southeast and east, across the southwest corner of the Cheyenne River Sioux Indian Reservation, and past Red Scaffold. It joins the Cheyenne at the town of Cherry Creek.

== See also ==
- List of rivers of South Dakota
