= Craig Schaunaman =

American politician

Member of the South Dakota House of Representatives from the 3rd district
- In office January 10, 1989 – January 12, 1999
- Succeeded by: Elmer Diedtrich

Personal details
- Born: October 2, 1959 (age 66) Aberdeen, South Dakota
- Party: Democratic

Craig Schaunaman (born October 2, 1959) is an American politician who served in the South Dakota House of Representatives from the 3rd district from 1989 to 1999.
