= Harold Frazier =

American politician and tribal leader

- Ta Hunska Luta (His Red Leggings)
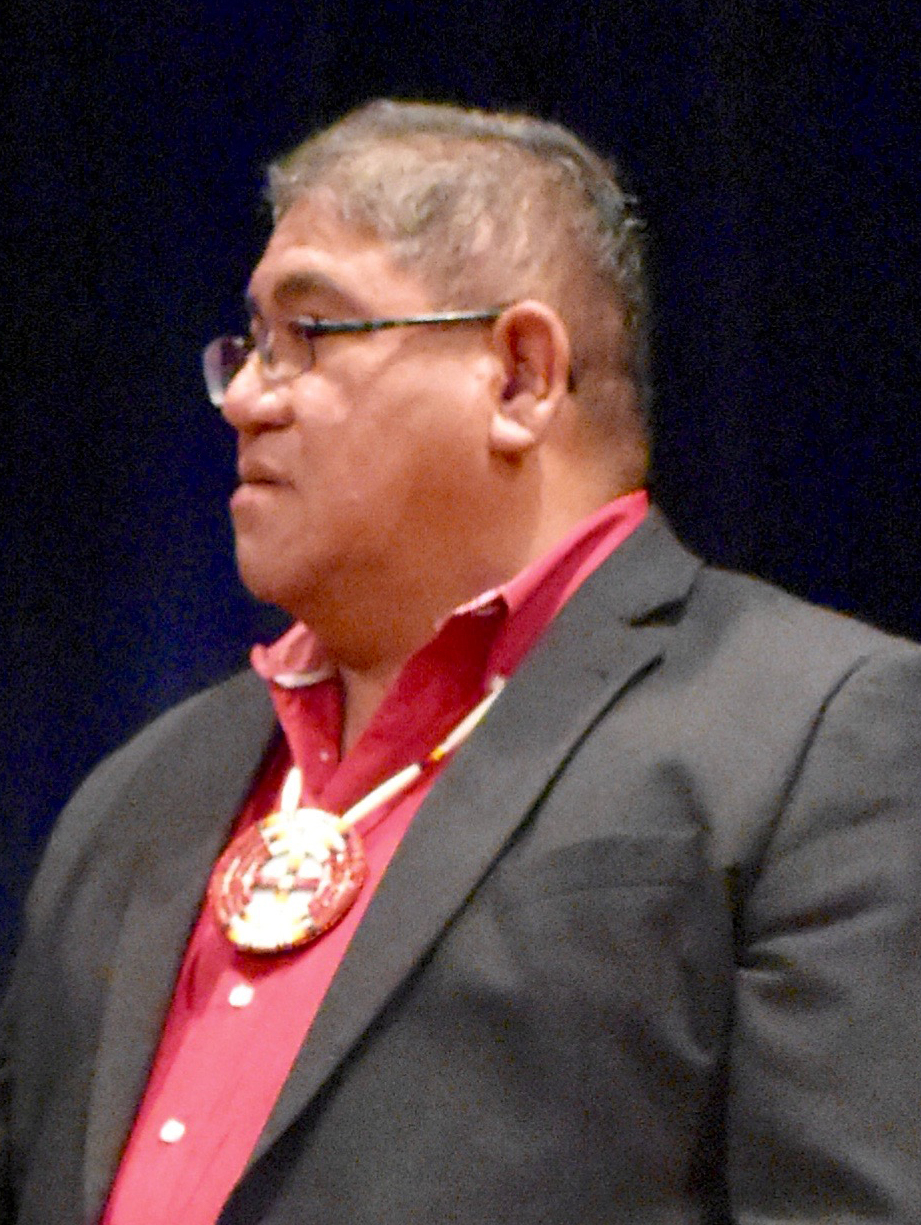
- Title: Cheyenne River Sioux Tribe Chairman
- Term: 2014 to November 6, 2022
- Predecessor: Kevin Keckler

Harold C. Frazier is an American politician and tribal leader who is the former chairman of the Cheyenne River Sioux Tribe, serving in that position since 2014. A member of the Democratic Party, Frazier serves concurrently as the chairman of the Great Plains Tribal Chairmen’s Association, a position he was elected to in 2018.

== Early life ==
Frazier was born on November 23, 1966, to Sam Frazier (Itazipco) and Greta Takes The Knife (Minicoujou). His Lakota name is Ta Hunska Luta (His Red Leggings). In 1985, Frazier graduated from Cheyenne Eagle Butte High School in Eagle Butte, South Dakota and went on to receive his AAS in Ag Business from Eastern Wyoming College in 1989. Frazier worked for the Cheyenne River Gas Company and Cheyenne River Telephone Authority until 1998 when he was elected to the Cheyenne River Sioux Tribal Council.

== Political career ==
=== Chairman Cheyenne River Sioux Tribe ===
In 2002, Harold was elected at large as the Cheyenne River Sioux Tribal Chairman, during his first chairmanship, he was elected as the Great Plains Area vice president of National Congress of American Indians (NCAI), as well as the honorary Sergeant at Arms for the 2004 Democratic Convention. In 2006 he was defeated for a Second term by Joseph Brings Plenty. Frazier then ran and was re-elected at large as the Cheyenne River Sioux Tribal Chairman succeeding Kevin Keckler in 2014. He has been subsequently re-elected to this position which he continues to serve in.

=== Campaigns for NCAI president ===
In 2017 Frazier ran for NCAI president losing to then Chickasaw Nation lieutenant governor Jefferson Keel who was elected as the 22nd president of NCAI after a close run-off with outgoing NCAI 1st vice president and Quinault Indian Nation president Fawn Sharp. Frazier ran again for NCAI president in 2019, coming in second place to current NCAI president Fawn Sharp.

=== Chairman Great Plains Tribal Chairmen's Association ===
In 2018, Frazier succeeded Tex Hall as chairman of the Great Plains Tribal Chairmen's Association a cooperative body "made up of the 16 tribal chairmen, presidents, and chairpersons in the states of North Dakota, South Dakota, and Nebraska."

== Political positions ==
=== Keystone XL Pipeline ===
Frazier was a staunch opponent of the Keystone Pipeline, which the Cheyenne River Sioux Tribe has opposed since 2008. In 2014, the tribal council passed a resolution prohibiting pipeline workers from operating on tribal land In 2019, the Cheyenne River Sioux Tribe, Yankton Sioux Tribe, and Dakota Rural Action filed suit to challenge the State of South Dakota's approval of the pipeline.

=== COVID-19 checkpoints ===
In 2020, in an attempt to mitigate the spread of COVID-19, Frazier ordered the tribal government to establish traffic checkpoints throughout reservation territory. South Dakota Governor Kristi Noem opposed the checkpoints and ordered the tribe to take them down. Frazier, refused to comply, arguing that the establishment of the checkpoints was within the tribe's right as a 'sovereign nation'.

=== Mount Rushmore fireworks ===
In April 2021, Governor Kristi Noem sued the Department of the Interior after the National Park Service denied the state of South Dakota a permit to hold a fireworks display at Mount Rushmore on the Fourth of July, citing the risk of forest fire. In May, Frazier and the Cheyenne River Sioux Tribe filed a motion to intervene in the lawsuit arguing that they were being misrepresented by Noem who claimed to have consulted with tribal leadership prior to applying for the fireworks permit. Later that Month, federal judge Roberto Lange ruled that the Cheyenne River Sioux Tribe would be allowed to join legal arguments opposing Noem’s efforts to put on a July Fourth fireworks display at Mount Rushmore.

== Personal life ==
Frazier lives in White Horse, South Dakota. He has one daughter, two sons, and one grandchild.
