= La Plant, South Dakota =

- Census-designated place
- Location in Dewey County and the state of South Dakota
- Coordinates: 45°08′17″N 100°39′53″W
- Country: United States
- State: South Dakota
- County: Dewey

Area
  - Total: 9.49 sq mi (24.57 km^{2})
  - Land: 9.45 sq mi (24.48 km^{2})
  - Water: 0.039 sq mi (0.10 km^{2})
- Elevation: 2,041 ft (622 m)

Population (2020)
  - Total: 167
  - Density: 17.7/sq mi (6.82/km^{2})
- Time zone: UTC-7 (Mountain (MST))
  - Summer (DST): UTC-6 (MDT)
- ZIP code: 57652
- Area code: 605
- FIPS code: 46-35940
- GNIS feature ID: 2393074

La Plant is a census-designated place (CDP) in Dewey County, South Dakota, United States. The population was 167 at the 2020 census. It is within the Cheyenne River Indian Reservation.

La Plant was laid out in 1910, and named in honor of a local cattleman.

== Geography ==
La Plant is located in east-central Dewey County and U.S. Route 212 passes through the community, leading west 32 miles (51 km) to Eagle Butte and east 39 miles (63 km) to Gettysburg. The Missouri River (Lake Oahe) is 20 miles (32 km) to the east, and Pierre, the state capital, is 76 miles (122 km) to the southeast.

According to the United States Census Bureau, the CDP has a total area of 9.5 square miles (24.6 km^{2}), of which 9.5 square miles (24.5 km^{2}) is land and 0.04 square miles (0.1 km^{2}), or 0.40%, is water.

== Demographics ==
Historical population
Census	Pop.	Note	%±
2020	167		—
U.S. Decennial Census

As of the census of 2000, there were 150 people, 34 households, and 29 families residing in the CDP. The population density was 16.6 people per square mile (6.4/km^{2}). There were 42 housing units at an average density of 4.7/sq mi (1.8/km^{2}). The racial makeup of the CDP was 100.00% Native American.

There were 34 households, out of which 58.8% had children under the age of 18 living with them, 41.2% were married couples living together, 35.3% had a female householder with no husband present, and 11.8% were non-families. 11.8% of all households were made up of individuals, and 5.9% had someone living alone who was 65 years of age or older. The average household size was 4.41 and the average family size was 4.73.

In the CDP, the population was spread out, with 45.3% under the age of 18, 13.3% from 18 to 24, 22.7% from 25 to 44, 14.7% from 45 to 64, and 4.0% who were 65 years of age or older. The median age was 19 years. For every 100 females, there were 105.5 males. For every 100 females age 18 and over, there were 95.2 males.

The median income for a household in the CDP was $18,194, and the median income for a family was $18,333. Males had a median income of $41,042 versus $7,250 for females. The per capita income for the CDP was $6,888. There were 62.5% of families and 61.6% of the population living below the poverty line, including 48.5% of those under 18 and 56.3% of those over 64.

== Education ==
It is in Eagle Butte School District 20-1, which jointly operates Cheyenne-Eagle Butte School with the Bureau of Indian Education (BIE).
