= KIPI (FM) =

Radio station of the Cheyenne River Sioux Tribe in Eagle Butte, South Dakota

Eagle Butte, South Dakota; United States
- Frequency: 93.5 MHz (HD Radio)
- Branding: KIPI Radio

Programming
- Format: Variety

Ownership
- Owner: Cheyenne River Sioux Tribe

Technical information
- Licensing authority: FCC
- Facility ID: 199400
- Class: C1
- ERP: 100,000 watts
- HAAT: 203 metres (666 ft)
- Transmitter coordinates: 45°01′32″N 101°14′22″W

Links
- Public license information: Public file; LMS
- Webcast: Listen Live
- Website: Official Website

KIPI (93.5 FM) is a radio station licensed to serve the community of Eagle Butte, South Dakota. The station is owned by the Cheyenne River Sioux Tribe and airs a variety radio format.

The station was assigned the KIPI call letters by the Federal Communications Commission on December 8, 2017.
