= Heather Thompson =

Heather Thompson could refer to:

- Heather Ann Thompson, American historian
- Heather Dawn Thompson, Native American lawyer

== See also ==
- Heather Thomson (disambiguation)
