= Glencross, South Dakota =

Glencross, South Dakota Mázačhaŋku Otȟúŋwahe
- Unincorporated community
- Location within the state of South Dakota
- Coordinates: 45°26′54″N 100°55′17″W
- Country: United States
- State: South Dakota
- County: Dewey
- Founded: 1919
- Named for: Two nearby glens
- Elevation: 2,152 ft (656 m)
- Time zone: UTC-7 (Mountain (MST))
  - Summer (DST): UTC-6 (MDT)
- ZIP codes: 57630
- Area code: 605
- FIPS code: 46-24460
- GNIS feature ID: 1255259

Glencross (Lakota: Mázačhaŋku Otȟúŋwahe; "Railroad Village") is an unincorporated community in Dewey County in the U.S. state of South Dakota. It is located within the Cheyenne River Indian Reservation.

== History ==
Glencross was founded in 1919 by Conrad Mattern, who, along with his brother Frederick Louis Mattern, owned and operated the first store in the town. The town's name reportedly comes from its location where two valleys, or glens, intersect.

== Notable person ==
- Elmer Diedtrich, South Dakota politician
