= Marcella LeBeau =

American Lakota politician (1919–2021)

Marcella Ryan LeBeau (October 12, 1919 – November 21, 2021), also known as Marcella Le Beau and Wigmuke Waste' Win, was a Lakota elder, politician, nurse, and military veteran.

== Early life and education ==
LeBeau was born Wigmuke Waste' Win (English: Pretty Rainbow Woman) in October 1919 in Promise, South Dakota on the Cheyenne River Indian Reservation. Her parents were Joseph M. Ryan and Florence Four Bear Ryan. Her mother was of the Two Kettles subtribe of the Lakota. Her father was Irish-American. She was the oldest of five children in the family. Her mother died when she was ten and LeBeau was raised by her father. LeBeau also helped run the household, learning to cook and sew to care for her siblings. As a child, she attended an Indian boarding school.

She earned her undergraduate degree in nursing in 1942 from St. Mary's Hospital in Pierre, South Dakota.

== Career ==
After graduation, LeBeau began working as a registered nurse in Pontiac, Michigan. In 1943, she enlisted in the United States Army Nurse Corps to serve in World War II. LeBeau served in France, England and Belgium under the 76th General Hospital unit, including at the Battle of the Bulge. She left the Army as a First Lieutenant.

When her service ended, she returned to South Dakota, specifically Rapid City. While there, she experienced racial segregation, including not being allowed to purchase certain products, such as vanilla extract, at the grocery store.

LeBeau worked for the Indian Health Service (IHS). LeBeau served as director of nursing at the IHS facility in Eagle Butte, South Dakota. She worked for IHS for 31 years before retiring. As a result of her medical career, she received the O. Marie Henry RNDNSC Chief Nurse and the Mable Ann Wagner Award.

In 1991, she was elected to the Cheyenne River Sioux Tribal Council. During her tenure on the council, LeBeau banned smoking in tribal chambers and promoted other anti-smoking policies. LeBeau's anti-smoking efforts on the Cheyenne River Indian Reservation are credited with helping the reservation become the first smoke-free community in South Dakota.

== Later life and death ==
In 2004, LeBeau was awarded the Legion of Honour for her World War II service. LeBeau was inducted into the South Dakota Hall of Fame in 2006.

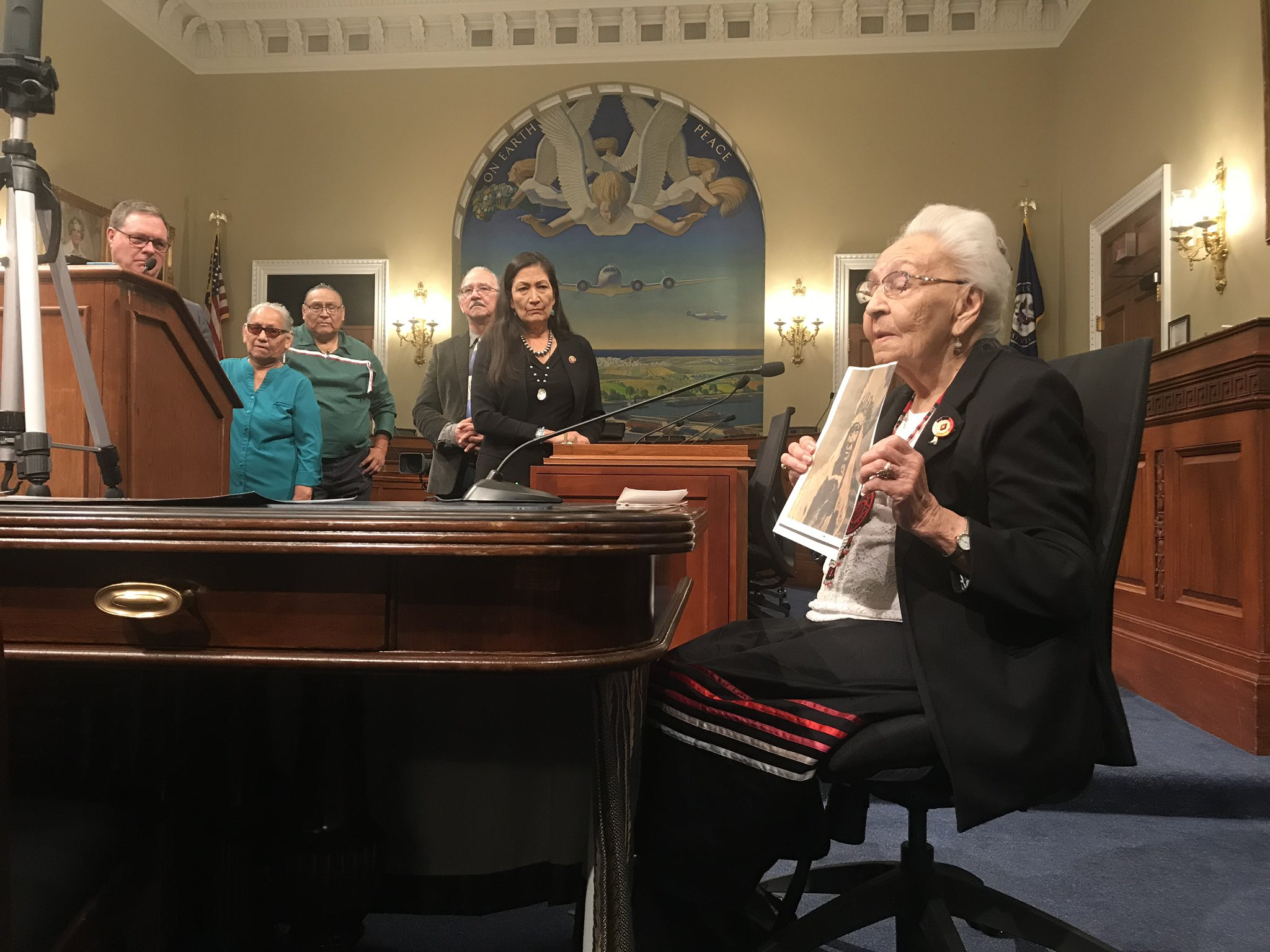
LeBeau speaking at the robing ceremony for the Remove the Stains Act in 2019.

LeBeau was awarded the Women in History Award from the Spirit of the Prairie Chapter of the Daughters of the American Revolution in 2016. LeBeau also has an honorary degree from South Dakota State University. She celebrated her 100th birthday on October 12, 2019. That day was proclaimed Wigmuke Waste Win (Pretty Rainbow Woman) Marcella LeBeau Day by the state of South Dakota. She also received a Senatorial Tribute by Senator John Thune and a quilt from the North American Indian Women's Association, an organization which she helped found.

LeBeau supported the Remove the Stain Act in the United States Congress, which seeks to rescind the medals of honor awarded to American soldiers who participated in the Wounded Knee Massacre. In 2019, she spoke at a ceremony to introduce the bill, alongside Deb Haaland, at the U.S. Capitol.

In 2020, LeBeau was awarded a Leadership Award from the National Congress of American Indians.

LeBeau died on November 21, 2021, at the age of 102. She was married and had eight children.

== See also ==
- List of Native American politicians
- Native American women in politics
