= Cheyenne-Eagle Butte School =

School district in South Dakota, United States

Coordinates: 45°00′02″N 101°14′14″W

Eagle Butte School District 20-1, is a school district with its headquarters in Eagle Butte, South Dakota. The district covers sections of Ziebach County and Dewey County.

The district and the Bureau of Indian Education (BIE) jointly administer the Cheyenne-Eagle Butte School (C-EB), with the Cheyenne River Sioux Tribe being represented in the management process. The BIE categorizes the school as BIE-operated.

The school and the community lie within the Cheyenne River Indian Reservation.

== History ==
As of 2021, the school buildings are scheduled to be replaced by the Bureau of Indian Education using funds from the Great American Outdoors Act.

== Operations ==
As of 1989 the BIE school entity and the school district have two separate school boards and two separate pools of employees, and the two entities also combine a jointly-operated school board. Kevin Woster of Rapid City Journal described the school as "a federal-state mix of money and staff" and that therefore its budget changes depending on how much money is available from South Dakota state government and/or the federal government.

== Academics ==
As of 1989 the students take both tests required by the South Dakota state government, including the SAT, and tests required by the federal government.

== Service area ==
Within Ziebach County it serves Eagle Butte.

Within Dewey County it serves Green Grass, La Plant, Lantry, North Eagle Butte, and Swift Bird.

The district has a total area of 1,646 square miles (4,260 km^{2}).

== Campuses ==
The main school campus is partially in Eagle Butte and partially in North Eagle Butte.

The system has dormitories for students in grades 1–12. Boys and girls are separated, and students in grades 1-6 are separated from those in grades 7–12. As of 1989 the dormitories house Native American students who were rejected from other schools.

== Divisions ==
Divisions include:

- High school (grades 9–12)
- Junior high school (7-8)
- Upper elementary school (3-6) - It is a part of the school district entity. As of 2021 it had about 390 students with all of them qualifying for free or reduced lunch (a mark of poverty) and 98% of them being Native American. There are twenty classrooms used for traditional education.
- Primary school (Kindergarten-2)

Alternative school

- E.A.G.L.E. Center (for grades 7–12)

== Student body ==
As of 2021 there were 1,143 students, with 98% being Native American.

In 2009 the school had 800 students, including 30 in kindergarten and 150 in junior high school.

In 1989 the majority of the students were Native American though there were also White American students.

== Academic achievement ==
In 1989 officials from the South Dakota state government criticized the management of the school. The management of Cheyenne-Eagle Butte stated that it is working to address the issue though it stated that the school did not have high enough scores and had too high of a dropout rate.

== School uniforms ==
The school district adopted school uniforms for students in Kindergarten and grades 7-8 for fall 2009. The Cheyenne River Sioux tribe filed a lawsuit against the school district, saying that the code, announced shortly before the start of classes, forced inconvenience on tribal members.
