= Eastern Wyoming College =

Community college in Torrington, Wyoming, U.S.

- Type: Public community college
- Established: 1948; 78 years ago
- President: Jeffry Hawes
- Students: 1,505
- Location: Torrington, Wyoming, U.S. 42.07898°N 104.19065°W
- Campus: Torrington and Douglas, Wyoming
- Colors: Black & gold
- Nickname: Lancers
- Mascot: Lloyd the Lancer
- Website: ewc.wy.edu
- Location in Wyoming

Eastern Wyoming College (EWC) is a public community college in Torrington, Wyoming, with a satellite campus in Douglas, Wyoming. The college has outreach centers in Chugwater, Glendo, Guernsey, Hulett, Lusk, Moorcroft, Newcastle, Sundance, Upton, and Wheatland.

== History ==
EWC was founded in 1948 as the Southeast University Center, an extension of the University of Wyoming and a part of the Torrington School District 3. In June of 1956, the citizens of the Torrington Public School District voted to organize the Goshen County Community College District as an independent subdivision with a separate board of trustees. Over the next few years, additional school districts elected to join the college district. In December 1968 the name of the college was changed to Eastern Wyoming Community College District.

== Leadership ==
The Eastern Wyoming College Board consists of seven members elected to four year terms by the eligible voters within the College District. Jeffry Hawes became the college president in July 2022.

== Notable alumni ==
- Jason Dixon
- Harold C. Frazier, Cheyenne River Sioux tribal leader
- Matt Lojeski
- Chris Starkjohann
