= Cheyenne River Indian Reservation =

Indian reservation in South Dakota, United States

Cheyenne River Indian Reservation Wakpá Wašté Oyáŋke
- Indian reservation
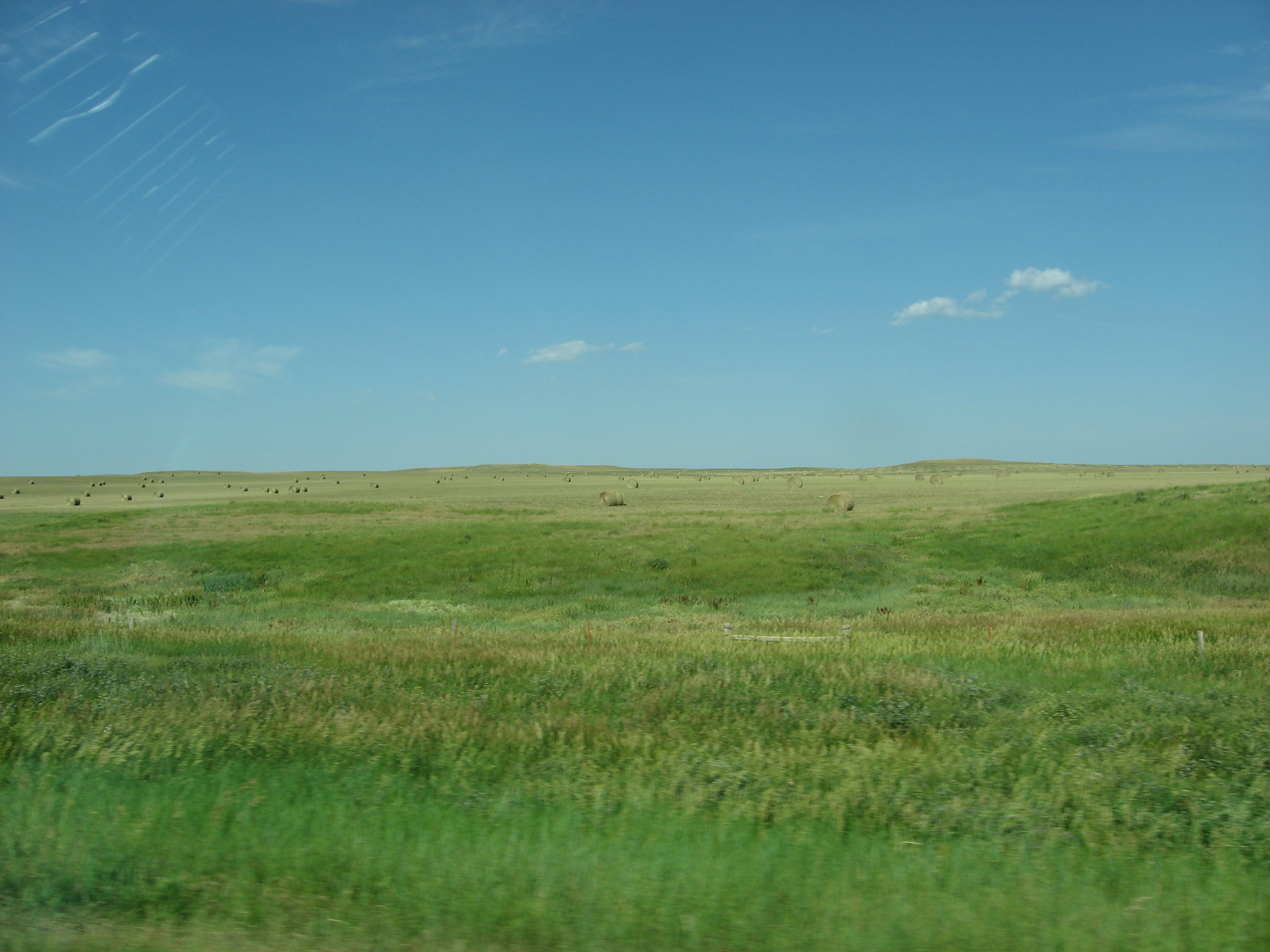
- Farmland on the reservation

- Location in South Dakota
- Coordinates: 45°04′35″N 101°13′33″W
- Tribe: Cheyenne River Sioux Tribe
- Country: United States
- State: South Dakota
- Counties: Dewey; Haakon; Meade; Stanley; Ziebach
- Established: 1889

Government
  - Governing body: General Tribal Council

Area
  - Total: 11,051.447 km^{2} (4,266.988 sq mi)

Population (2010)
  - Total: 8,090
- Time zone: UTC-7 (MST)
  - Summer (DST): UTC-6 (MDT)
- GDP: $154.8 million (2018)
- Website: cheyenneriversioux.com

The Cheyenne River Indian Reservation (Lakota: Wakpá Wašté Oyáŋke) was created by the United States in 1889 by breaking up the Great Reservation, following the attrition of the Lakota in a series of wars in the 1870s. The reservation covers almost all of Dewey and Ziebach counties in South Dakota. In addition, many small parcels of off-reservation trust land are located in Stanley, Haakon, and Meade counties.

The total land area is 4,266.987 sq mi (11,051.447 km^{2}), making it the fourth-largest Indian reservation in land area in the United States. Its largest community is unincorporated North Eagle Butte, while adjacent Eagle Butte is its largest incorporated city.

== Land status ==
The original Cheyenne River Reservation covered over 5,000 square miles (13,000 km^{2}). The reservation has subsequently decreased in size; today, it is 4,266.987 sqmi (11,051.447 km^{2}). The original northern boundary was the Grand River. In the early 20th century, land south of the Grand River was ceded to the Standing Rock Reservation.

The land was opened up to non-Native settlement in 1909. When the Homestead Acts took effect, the northern part of the Cheyenne River Reservation was lost. The southern section of the Cheyenne River Reservation remained. It covers 1,514,652 acres (612,958 ha).

A small number of White River Utes were resettled on the reservation in 1906 and 1907, being allocated four townships totaling 92,160 acres (37,300 ha). That land remains in the former northern part of the Cheyenne River Reservation. Their communities are Iron Lightning and Thunder Butte.

Four Bear Creek, a tributary of the Missouri River, is located in the Cheyenne River Reservation.

== History ==
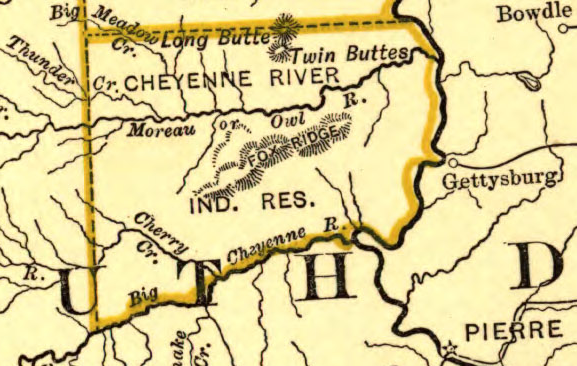
Map of the reservation from 1900

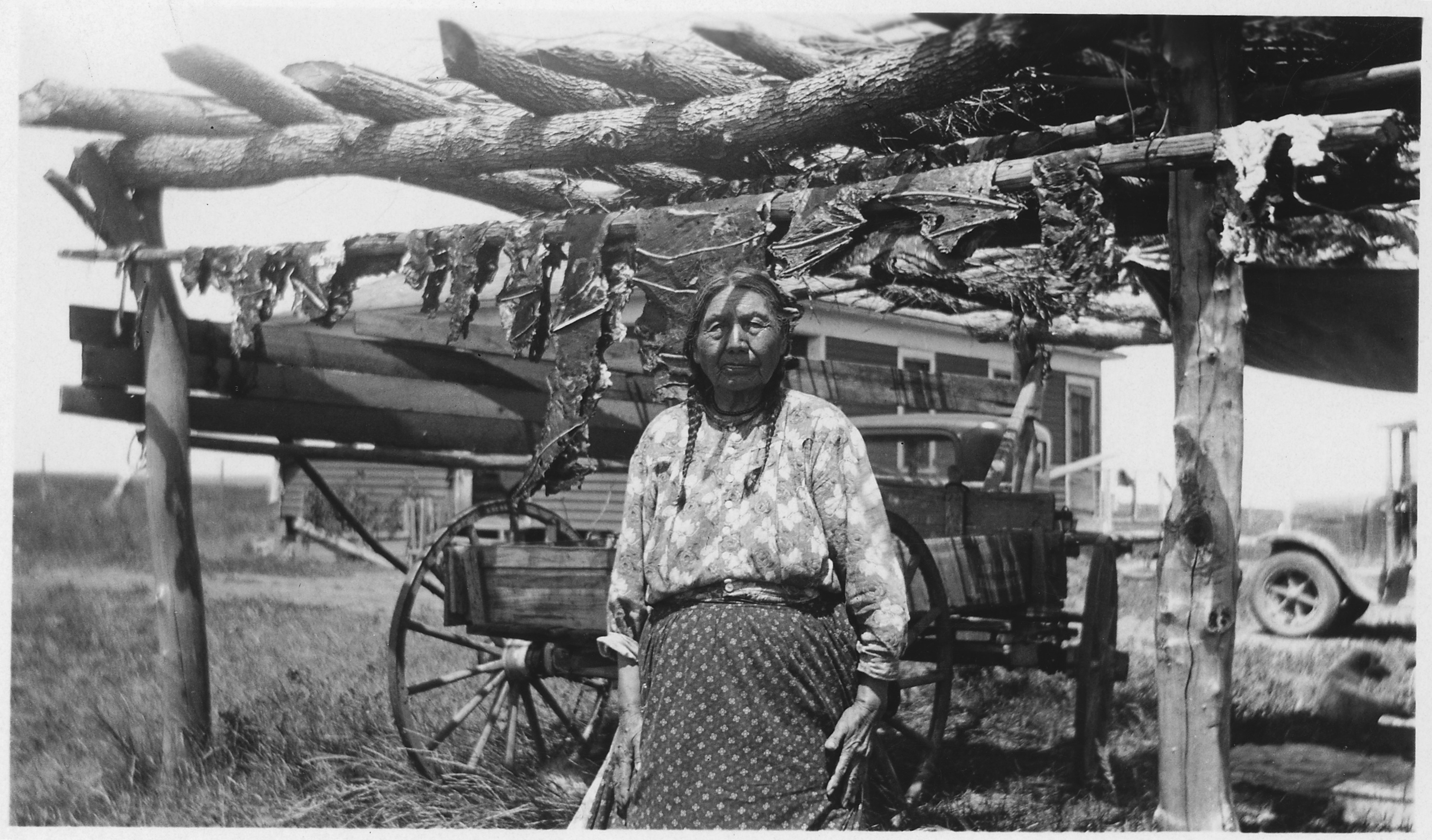
Woman drying food on an outdoor rack in the 1930s

The Treaty of Fort Laramie of 1868 created the Great Sioux Reservation, a single reservation covering parts of six states, including both of the Dakotas. Subsequent treaties in the 1870s and 1880s broke this reservation up into several smaller reservations. The Cheyenne River Indian Reservation was created in 1889.

Chief Sitting Bull lived north of the Cheyenne River Reservation on the Grand River, which is the Standing Rock Reservation. In 1890, the United States became very concerned about Chief Sitting Bull who they feared was going to lead an exodus off the Reservation.

Several hundred Lakota gathered on the Grand River on the Standing Rock Reservation in December 1890, preparing to flee the reservation. A force of 39 Indian policemen and four volunteers were sent to chief Sitting Bull's residence near the Grand River on December 16, 1890, to arrest him.

Initially, Sitting Bull cooperated but became angry once led out of his residence and noticed around 50 of his soldiers were there to support him. During some point while outside of chief Sitting Bull's residence, a battle commenced in which the legendary leader was killed. A total of 18 casualties occurred in the battle. Among the killed were Sitting Bull and his son.

Sitting Bull's half brother, Spotted Elk, led an exodus of 350 people off the Standing Rock Reservation to the south onto the Cheyenne River Reservation. They were captured on December 28, 1890, on the Pine Ridge Reservation, about 30 miles to the east of the settlement of Pine Ridge. Next day they were attacked by over 500 US Army soldiers, an event known as the Wounded Knee Massacre. Approximately 250 to 300 Natives were killed, including many women and children, and the massacre halted the exodus. Survivors settled on the Pine Ridge Reservation or returned to the Cheyenne River Reservation.

Since then, the Cheyenne River Reservation's northern border has changed. It is no longer the Grand River. The 60th United States Congress authorized the sale of unallotted land on the reservation in 1908, and in 1909 William Howard Taft issued a presidential proclamation which opened up the Cheyenne River Reservation to white settlement. However, the present day settlements located along the Grand River are predominantly Algonquian.

Beginning in 1948, the US government dammed the Missouri River for electrical power and flood control. The dam project submerged 8% of reservation land.

On August 15, 2018, the tribe signed KIPI on the air. The station serves as an educational and economic opportunity for residents of the reservation.

== Tribal flag ==
"The blue represents the thunderclouds above the world where the thunderbirds who control the four winds live. The rainbow is for the Cheyenne River Sioux people who are keepers of the most Sacred Calf Pipe, a gift from the White Buffalo Calf Maiden. The eagle feathers at the edges at the rim of the world represent the spotted eagle who is the protector of all Lakota. The two pipes fused together are for unity. One pipe is for the Lakota; the other for all the other Indian Nations. The Yellow hoops represent the Sacred Hoop, which shall not be broken. The Sacred Calf Pipe bundle in red represents Wakan Tanka – The Great Mystery. All the colors of the Lakota are visible. The red, yellow, black, and white represent the four major races. The blue is for heaven and the green for Mother Earth."

== Current conditions ==
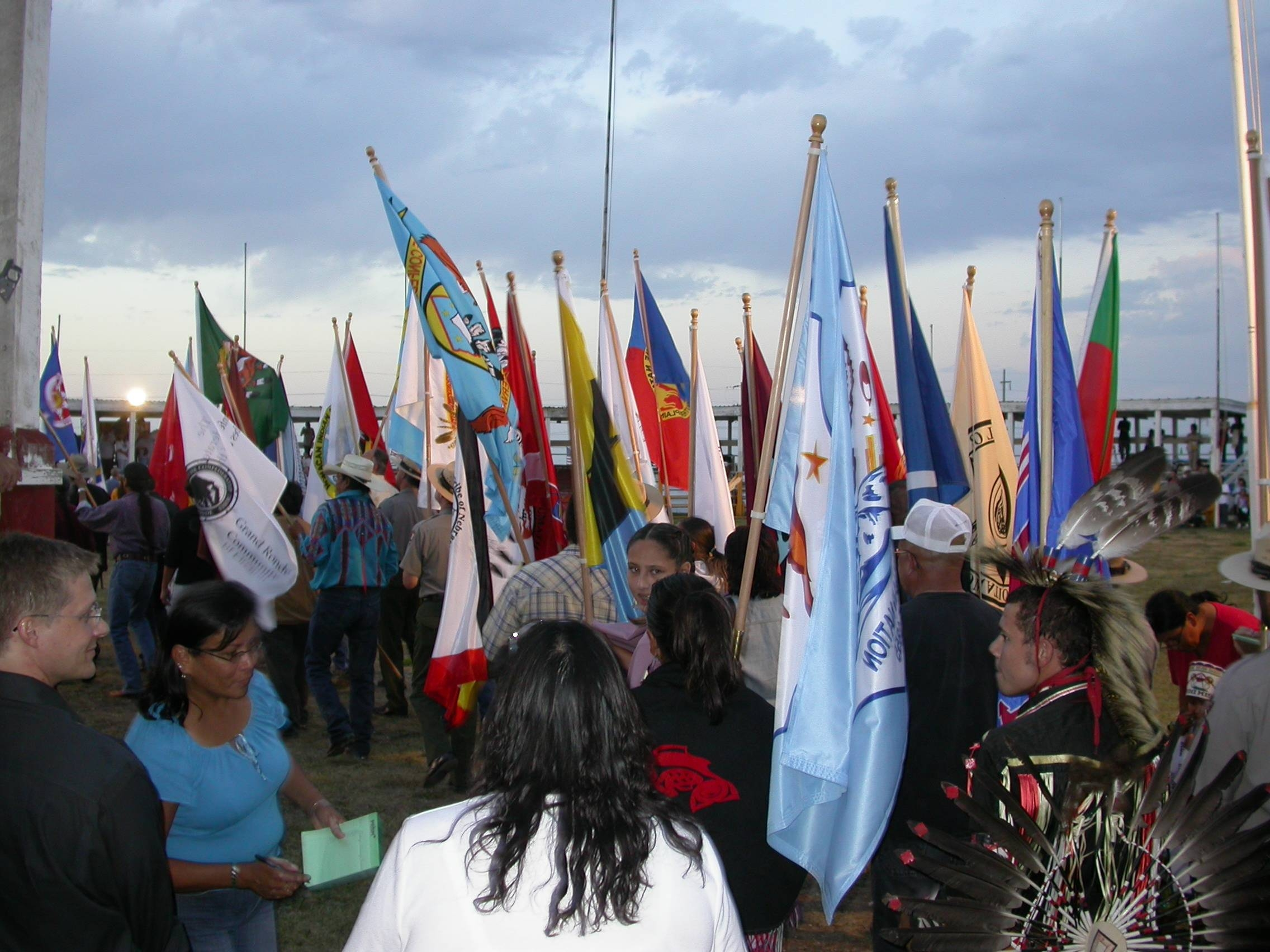
Tribal flags at Eagle Butte

The CRIR is the home of the federally recognized Cheyenne River Sioux Tribe (CRST) or Cheyenne River Lakota Nation (Lakota: Wakpá Wašté Lakȟóta Oyáte). The members include representatives from four of the traditional seven bands of the Lakota, also known as Teton Sioux: the Minnecoujou, Two Kettle (Oohenunpa), Sans Arc (Itazipco) and Blackfoot (Sihásapa).

The CRIR is bordered on the north by the Standing Rock Sioux Reservation, on the west by Meade and Perkins Counties; on the south by the Cheyenne River; and on the east by the Missouri River in Lake Oahe. Much of the land inside the boundaries is privately owned. The CRST headquarters and BIA agency are located at Eagle Butte, South Dakota. The reservation is reached via US-212.

The 2010 census reported a population of 8,090 persons. Many of the 13 small communities on the Cheyenne River Reservation do not have water systems, making it difficult for people to live in sanitary conditions. In recent years, water systems have been constructed that tap the Missouri Main Stem reservoirs, such as Lake Oahe, which forms the eastern edge of the Reservation.

With few jobs available on the reservation or in nearby towns, many tribal members are unemployed. Two-thirds of the population survives on much less than one-third of the American average income. Such dismal living conditions have contributed to feelings of hopelessness and despair among the youth. Indian Country Today reports than one in five girls on the Cheyenne River Reservation has contemplated suicide and more than one in ten has attempted it. As of 2009, a modern medical center was under construction in Eagle Butte to replace an outdated facility.

Beginning on January 22, 2010, a blizzard and ice storm swept across the reservation, downing as many as 3,000 power lines and leaving thousands of residents without power, heat or water. Response to the disaster was slow. Although the state government declared a state of emergency, the situation did not initially receive much attention in the media or from legislators. Power was finally restored to most residents as of February 12, 2010, but overall conditions were still grim.

On February 14, 2010, the TV commentator Keith Olbermann highlighted the situation on his program Countdown with Keith Olbermann. Within 48 hours more than $250,000 in donations was raised for the reservation. As of February 24, 2010, more than $400,000 in donations had been raised. No deaths had been reported as a result of the disaster. Several elderly residents dependent on dialysis treatment were evacuated to nearby towns. As of February 26, 2010, tribal representatives turned attention to raising awareness about the reservation's damaged water infrastructure.

== Communities ==
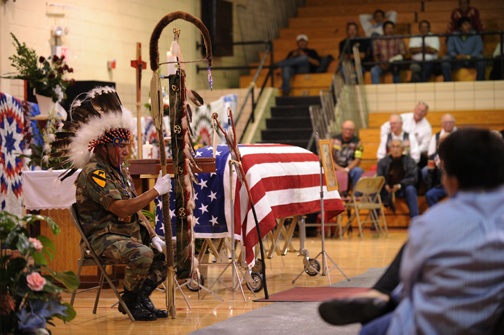
Remains of a Native American soldier, who died during the Korean War, are honored at a funeral in Eagle Butte before reburial in South Dakota in 2009.

The communities of Iron Lightning, Thunder Butte, Bullhead, Little Eagle, and Wakpala date back to the original 1889 reservation boundaries. Nearly all communities on the Cheyenne River Reservation, including in the land area settled by white homesteaders after 1908, have a majority population of Native Americans. Most of the communities rank as the lowest income per-capita in the United States. However, Eagle Butte and North Eagle Butte are more economically diverse, and the main business district of Eagle Butte is similar to that of many communities with comparable populations.

- Blackfoot
- Bridger
- Dupree
- Cherry Creek
- Green Grass
- Iron Lightning
- Isabel
- La Plant
- North Bridger
- North Eagle Butte
- Red Scaffold
- Swiftbird
- Thunder Butte
- Timber Lake
- Whitehorse
- Bear Creek, South Dakota

== Education ==
Cheyenne-Eagle Butte School, which is jointly operated by the Bureau of Indian Education (BIE) and the Eagle Butte School District 20–1, is on the reservation.

== Notable tribal citizens ==
- Harold Frazier, tribal chairman, 2014–current
- Rhonda Holy Bear (born 1959), sculptor, beadworker, dollmaker
- Marcella LeBeau, former tribal councilmember, nurse, and military veteran
- Jana Schmieding, actor and comedian
- Jakeb Sullivan, professional football quarterback
- Madonna Swan, author
- Heather Dawn Thompson, attorney and Director of the Office of Tribal Relations for the USDA
- Touch the Clouds, chief of Minneconjou Teton Lakota

== Attractions ==
Timber Lake and Area Museum	Items from the Cheyenne River Sioux Tribe and Standing Rock Sioux Tribe are at the museum. A collection of marine fossils, native to South Dakota, are also on display. Visitors can purchase locally made goods.
H.V. Johnston Lakota Cultural Center	The museum is home to a collection of artifacts from the Cheyenne River Sioux Tribe, including murals, photographs, beadwork, and paintings. Visitors can also purchase locally made goods.
Native American Scenic Byway	A 450-mile-long byway that leads from the Nebraska border to the North Dakota border. It goes through 5 reservations and tribal lands.
International Society for the Protection of Mustangs and Burros (ISPMB)	A Native non-profit organization whose mission is to save America's wild horses and burros. The attraction allows visitors to take a tour through the herds of horses.

== See also ==
- Sue (dinosaur)
