= Lantry, South Dakota =

- Unincorporated community
- Location within the state of South Dakota Lantry (the United States)
- Coordinates: 45°01′06″N 101°25′58″W
- Country: United States
- State: South Dakota
- County: Dewey

Area
  - Total: 0.42 sq mi (1.08 km^{2})
  - Land: 0.42 sq mi (1.08 km^{2})
  - Water: 0 sq mi (0.00 km^{2})
- Elevation: 2,382 ft (726 m)

Population (2020)
  - Total: 33
  - Density: 79.5/sq mi (30.68/km^{2})
- Time zone: UTC-6 (Central (CST))
  - Summer (DST): UTC-5 (CDT)
- ZIP codes: 57636
- FIPS code: 46-35900
- GNIS feature ID: 2813015

Lantry is an unincorporated community and a census-designated place (CDP) in Dewey County, South Dakota, United States. The population of the CDP was 33 at the 2020 census.

According to the Federal Writers' Project, the origin of the name Lantry is obscure.

== Demographics ==
Historical population
| Census | Pop. | Note | %± |
|---|---|---|---|
| 2020 | 33 | | — |
U.S. Decennial Census

== Education ==
It is in the Eagle Butte School District, which jointly operates Cheyenne-Eagle Butte School with the Bureau of Indian Education (BIE).
