= Rhonda Holy Bear =

Native American artist from South Dakota, U.S.

- Wakah Wayuphika Win
- Born: December 15, 1959 (age 66); Cheyenne River Indian Reservation, South Dakota, U.S.
- Citizenship: Cheyenne River Sioux Tribe and American
- Education: Ella Bears Heart, self-taught
- Known for: dolls, sculpture, beadwork
- Style: Northern Plains
- Spouse: Jim Buck
- Relatives: Charlene Holy Bear, sister
- Website: rhondaholybear.com

Rhonda Holy Bear (born December 15, 1959) is a Native American (Cheyenne River Lakota) beadworker and dollmaker. She is best known for her dolls depicting Native American people in traditional beaded regalia.

== Early life ==
Rhonda Holy Bear was born on the Cheyenne River Indian Reservation in South Dakota. She is a Hunkpapa Lakota and Dakota citizen of the Standing Rock Sioux Tribe. She began making dolls at age four, encouraged by her grandmother, Angeline Holy Bear (Lakota/Dakota). She was also inspired by her aunt Agatha Holy Bear Traversie, a beadworker who also tanned hides, and by Ella Bears Heart, a community member who taught her beading when she was nine. Rhonda grew up in La Plante, in a home with no running water or indoor plumbing. She attended Beadle Elementary School in Mobridge. She moved to Chicago when she was 14, and graduated from Little Big Horn High School.

Holy Bear remained in Chicago for the early part of her career, teaching high school students about traditional Native American arts.

== Art career ==
Holy Bear began working on her beaded dolls while in Chicago. In 1982, she began working at American West, an art gallery. The wife of the gallery owner took an interest in Holy Bear's dolls, buying two of them, and the gallery offered to sell some of her other dolls. The gallery later placed an advertisement for Holy Bear's work in American Indian Art Magazine, which launched her wider art career.

Holy Bear applied to the Art Institute of Chicago, but was ultimately unable to attend due to tuition costs. Instead, she took weekly trips to the Field Museum, where she sketched and studied the Native American clothing and beadwork in the museum's collection. Later, with the help of scholar Father Peter J. Powell, whom she had met in high school, Holy Bear was given access to the museum's archives.

In 1985, Holy Bear participated in the Santa Fe Indian Market for the first time. At the event, she received a Southwestern Association for Indian Arts (SWAIA) Fellowship, the first doll artist to do so. She also won the First and Second Place awards in the Plains Style doll category. Following this success, several of her pieces were purchased by the Wheelwright Museum of the American Indian for their permanent collection.

=== Works ===
Two of Holy Bear's dolls, a male and female Ghost Dancer, are in the permanent collections of the Sioux Indian Museum. Unlike some of her other works, which use wood bases, these dolls have a painted muslin base. A photograph of the dolls was the cover image for the 1989 Doll Issue of American Indian Art Magazine. The dolls were also included in the 1992 exhibition Contemporary Plains Indian Dolls at the Southern Plains Indian Museum in Anadarko, Oklahoma.

Her piece Lakota Honor-Sees the Horses Woman (SuWakan Ayutan Win), "portrays a Lakota widow honoring her fallen husband by wearing his regalia, including his eagle-feather war bonnet". Holy Bear began the doll in 2011, finishing it in 2023. It was inspired by Holy Bear's paternal grandmother, Josephine Sees The Horses Woman (b. 1872), who witnessed the Battle of the Little Bighorn at age four and whose father was killed in the battle. The piece won Best in Show at the 2021 Santa Fe Indian Market.

=== Style ===
Holy Bear has described her works as "hyperrealistic," due to the amount of details she includes in her dolls. She starts her pieces by carving a base of bass or balsa wood, which is painted with red oxide. She then moves on to creating clothing, which she decorates with beads and other materials. She utilizes the traditional Lakota paha stitch.

In addition to beads, Holy Bear works with a variety of materials to create her dolls, including bone, buckskin, cloth, feathers, fur, horsehair, quills, shells, and wool. She has also learned metalwork and silversmithing, which she has also incorporated into her dolls.

Although Holy Bear primarily draws from Lakota tradition, she has also cited being influenced by Ancient Egyptian art.

== Personal life ==
Holy Bear is married to musician Jim Buck. The two met in Santa Fe, New Mexico. She has lived variously in Chamisal, New Mexico, Las Vegas, Nevada, and in Henderson, Nevada.

Holy Bear's sister, Charlene Holy Bear, is also an accomplished beadworker.

Her Lakota name, Wakah Wayuphika Win, means Making with Exceptional Skills Woman.

== Exhibitions ==
Holy Bear's work has been held and displayed by many institutions, including the Art Institute of Chicago, the Heard Museum, the Metropolitan Museum of Art, and the Wheelwright Museum of the American Indian.

Her first exhibition, Eloquent Visions: Dolls of the Great Plains, was held in 1983 at the Museum of the American Indian's George Gustav Heye Center in New York City.

=== Selected exhibitions ===
- Museum of the American Indian, New York City (1983)
- C.N. Gorman Museum, University of California, Davis, California (1984)
- Sioux Indian Museum (SIM), Rapid City, South Dakota (1985), with Berniece Alderman
- Field Museum, Chicago, Illinois (2018–2019)
- Barry Art Museum, Old Dominion University (2022)

== Awards and recognition ==
- 1985: Santa Fe Indian Market
  - Southwestern Association for Indian Arts (SWAIA) Fellowship
  - First and Second Place awards in the Plains Style doll category
- 1985: Best of division award, Heard Museum Guild Indian Fair and Market
- 2011: First Prize, Cherokee Art Market, Tulsa, Oklahoma
- 2019: Best of Classification Award, Heard Museum Guild Indian Fair and Market
- 2019: Best of Show Award, Autry Indian Arts Marketplace
- 2019: Best of Show Award, Native People of the Plains Art Market
- 2021: Best in Show, Santa Fe Indian Market
