= Dakota Club Library =

Historic Building in South Dakota, US

- U.S. National Register of Historic Places
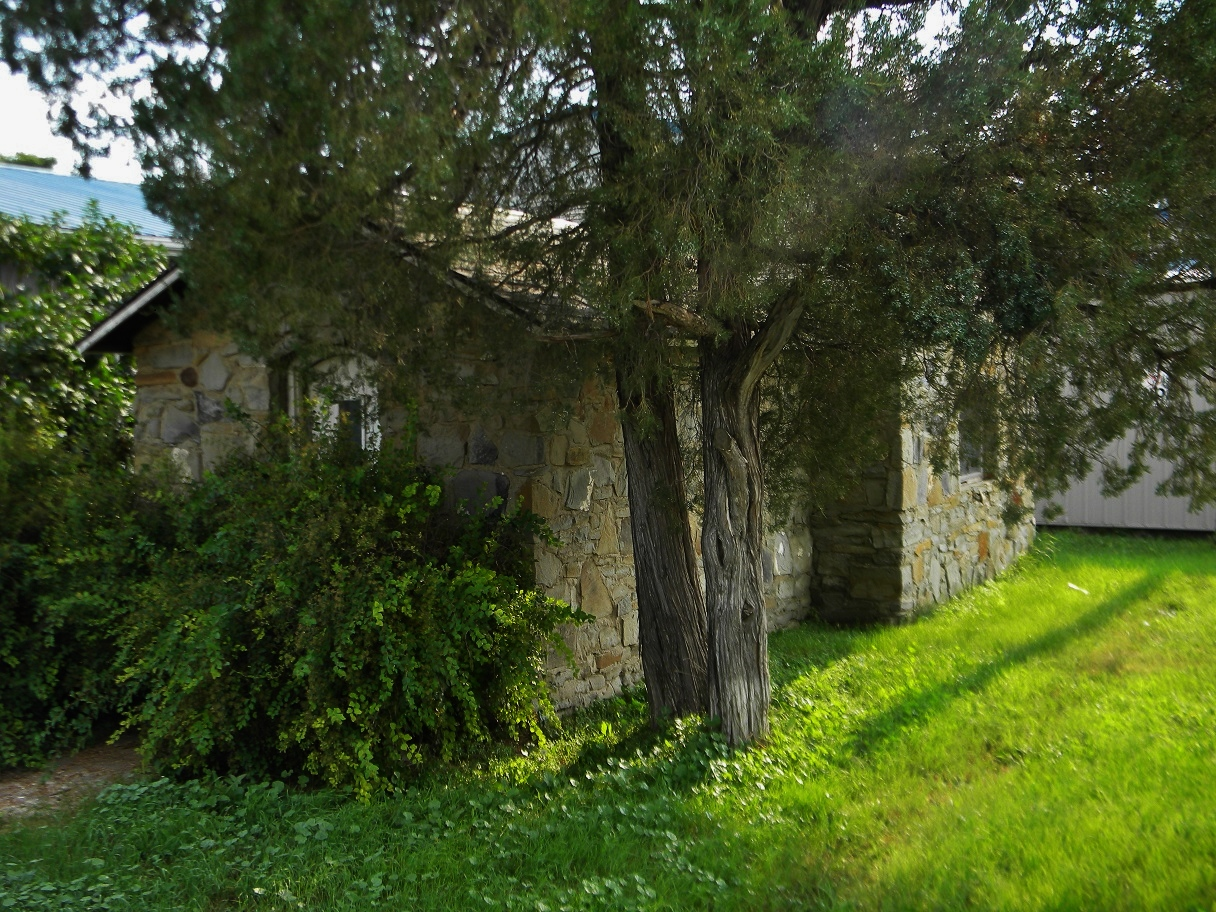

- Location within South Dakota Location within the United States
- Location: Lot 4 Block 3 Main St., Eagle Butte, South Dakota
- Coordinates: 44.99867°N 101.23517°W
- Area: less than one acre
- Built: 1910
- Built by: Works Progress Administration
- Architectural style: WPA
- MPS: Federal Relief Construction in South Dakota MPS
- NRHP reference No.: 04000474
- Added to NRHP: May 19, 2004

The Dakota Club Library in Eagle Butte, South Dakota, also known as the Eagle Butte Library, was built in 1910. It was listed on the National Register of Historic Places in 2004.

It is a sod building with a fieldstone veneer, on a stone foundation. It has a balloon frame addition to the rear, also with a fieldstone veneer, which is larger than the original building, and which forms a T-shape.
