= Heather Thomson =

Heather Thomson could refer to:

- Heather Thomson (soprano) (born 1940), Canadian soprano
- Heather Thomson Matthews (born 1946), New Zealand middle-distance runner
- Heather Thomson, participant in the reality television show The Real Housewives of New York City

== See also ==
- Heather Thompson (disambiguation)
