= Ridgeview, South Dakota =

- Unincorporated community
- Location within the state of South Dakota Ridgeview (the United States)
- Coordinates: 45°05′06″N 100°48′02″W
- Country: United States
- State: South Dakota
- County: Dewey
- Elevation: 2,362 ft (720 m)
- Time zone: UTC-6 (Mountain (MST))
  - Summer (DST): UTC-5 (CDT)
- ZIP codes: 57652
- GNIS feature ID: 1261134

Ridgeview is an unincorporated community in Dewey County, South Dakota, United States. Although not tracked by the Census Bureau, Ridgeview has been assigned the ZIP code of 57652.

The community was so named for the elevated town site's location upon a drainage divide.
