= Elmer Diedtrich =

American politician and businessman

Elmer Diedtrich (March 31, 1927 – February 19, 2013) was an American politician and businessman.

Born in Glencross, South Dakota, Diedtrich served in the United States Navy during World War II following graduation from Bowdle High School. He graduated from Northern State University and owned an insurance business. Diedtrich served in the South Dakota House of Representatives 1989–1992 and 1996–2000 and in the South Dakota State Senate 2001–2002. He died at Mercy Medical Center in Williston, North Dakota.
