= Green Grass, South Dakota =

Green Grass, South Dakota wakpála phežŋ
- CDP
- Location in Dewey County and the state of South Dakota
- Coordinates: 45°10′11″N 101°14′48″W
- Country: United States
- State: South Dakota
- County: Dewey

Area
  - Total: 8.13 sq mi (21.06 km^{2})
  - Land: 8.13 sq mi (21.06 km^{2})
  - Water: 0 sq mi (0.00 km^{2})
- Elevation: 1,900 ft (580 m)

Population (2020)
  - Total: 21
  - Density: 2.6/sq mi (1/km^{2})
- Time zone: UTC-7 (Mountain (MST))
  - Summer (DST): UTC-6 (MDT)
- Area code: 605
- FIPS code: 46-25900
- GNIS feature ID: 2393027

Green Grass (Lakota: wakpála phežŋ; "creek [of the] grass") is a census-designated place (CDP) in Dewey County, South Dakota, United States. The population was 21 at the 2020 census.

The community takes its name from nearby Green Grass Creek.

== Geography ==
According to the United States Census Bureau, the CDP has a total area of 8.2 square miles (21 km^{2}), all land.

== Demographics ==
Historical population
| Census | Pop. | Note | %± |
|---|---|---|---|
| 2020 | 21 | | — |
U.S. Decennial Census

As of the census of 2000, there were 58 people, 15 households, and 13 families residing in the CDP. The population density was 7.1 people per square mile (2.7/km^{2}). There were 18 housing units at an average density of 2.2/sq mi (0.8/km^{2}). The racial makeup of the CDP was 0.00% White, 96.55% Native American, and 3.45% from two or more races. Hispanic or Latino of any race were 15.52% of the population.

There were 15 households, out of which 46.7% had children under the age of 18 living with them, 40.0% were married couples living together, 33.3% had a female householder with no husband present, and 13.3% were non-families. 13.3% of all households were made up of individuals, and 6.7% had someone living alone who was 65 years of age or older. The average household size was 3.87 and the average family size was 4.23.

In the CDP, the population was spread out, with 43.1% under the age of 18, 5.2% from 18 to 24, 25.9% from 25 to 44, 13.8% from 45 to 64, and 12.1% who were 65 years of age or older. The median age was 28 years. For every 100 females, there were 123.1 males. For every 100 females age 18 and over, there were 106.3 males.

The median income for a household in the CDP was $14,688, and the median income for a family was $14,688. Males had a median income of $0 versus $0 for females. The per capita income for the CDP was $3,135. There were 57.1% of families and 77.4% of the population living below the poverty line, including 100.0% of under 18 and none of those over 64.

== Education ==
It is in Eagle Butte School District 20-1, which jointly operates Cheyenne-Eagle Butte School with the Bureau of Indian Education (BIE).
