= Swift Bird Creek =

Stream in South Dakota, U.S.

Coordinates: 45°07′33″N 100°22′24″W

Swift Bird Creek is a stream in the U.S. state of South Dakota.

Swift Bird Creek has the name of Chief Swift Bird, a member of the Sioux tribe.

== See also ==
- List of rivers of South Dakota
