= Heather Dawn Thompson =

American lawyer

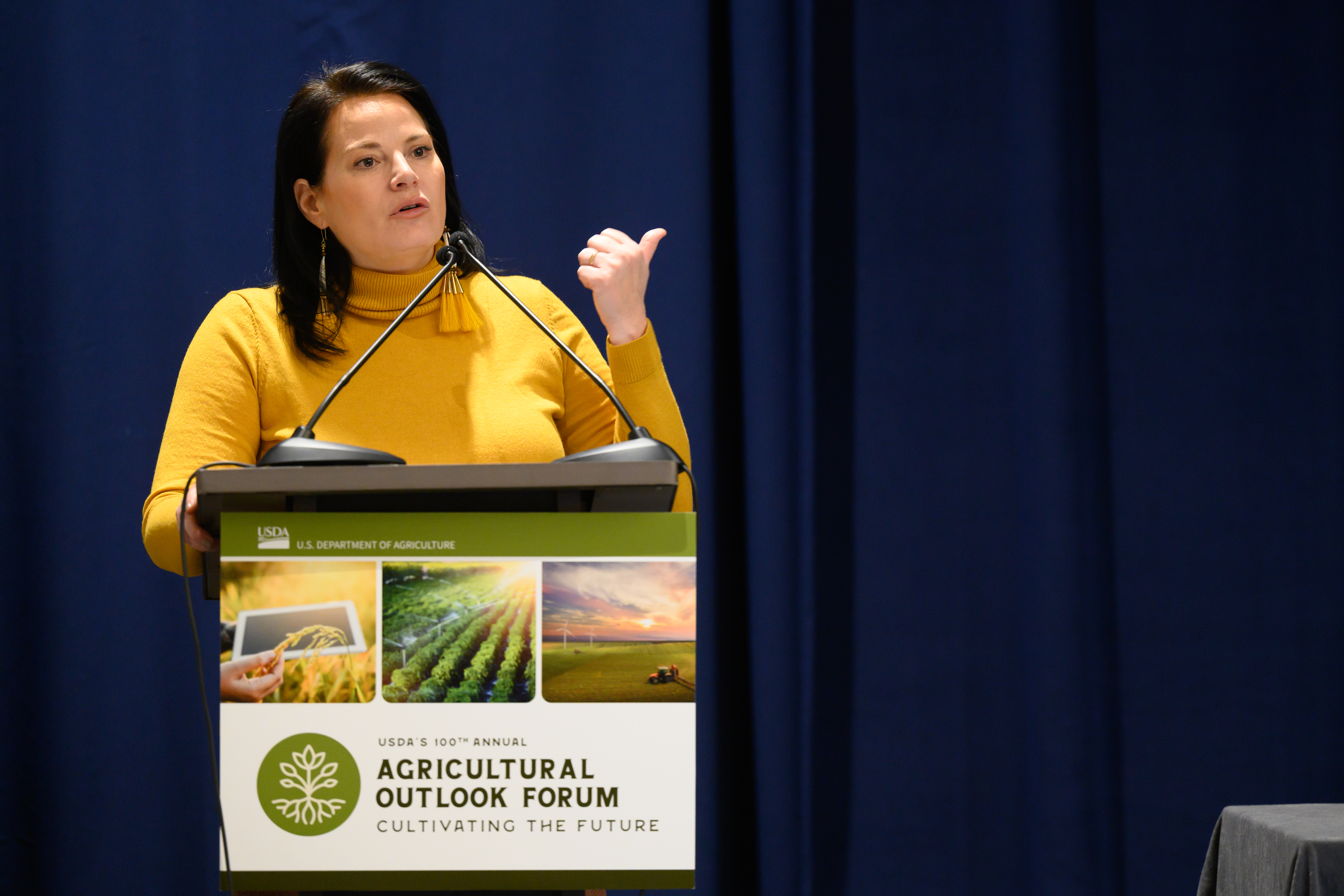

Personal details
- Education: Harvard Law School (JD)

Heather Dawn Thompson is a Lakota attorney from the Cheyenne River Sioux Tribe. She is the Vice President of Native Nations Conservation and Food Systems for the World Wildlife Fund. Thompson served as the director of the Office of Tribal Relations for the United States Department of Agriculture in the Joe Biden administration.

She focuses her practice on American Indian law, federal Indian policy and advocacy, tribal sovereignty, and tribal economic development including e-commerce, international trade, energy, finance, and telecom.

In addition, she concentrates on local tribal community economic development, tribal nation building (including constitutions, codes, and courts), criminal law, and homeland security. She works with corporations doing business in Indian Country, individual tribes, tribal and Indian-owned businesses, and intertribal associations.

Thompson is a graduate of Harvard Law School, where she graduated cum laude.

== Career ==
Prior to joining the firm, Thompson was an Assistant U.S. Attorney for the U.S. Attorney's Office in South Dakota's Indian Country Section. There, she was an Indian Country Federal Prosecutor that covered violent sex crimes and violence against women.

Thompson is recognized for her work while serving as the director of government affairs for the National Congress of American Indians (NCAI), the nation's oldest and largest intertribal organization. She also served as a Policy Advisor for Judiciary and Indian Affairs in the U.S. Senate. She also had extensive international experience, having lived on four different continents and traveled and worked in over 40 countries. Thompson frequently speaks on indigenous law and issues.

Heather is the former president of the National Native American Bar Association (NNABA) and the DC Native American Bar Association (NABA-DC), and is the current president the South Dakota Indian Country Bar Association (SDICBA).

== Personal life ==
Thompson lives in the Black Hills in South Dakota and in Washington, D.C. She is an enrolled member of the Cheyenne River Sioux tribe, and speaks English, Spanish, and Lakota.

== See also ==
- Native American women in politics
