= Promise, South Dakota =

Unincorporated community in South Dakota, U.S.

Coordinates: 45°19′58″N 100°36′14″W

Promise is an unincorporated community in Dewey County, in the U.S. state of South Dakota.

== History ==
A post office called Promise was established in 1911, and remained in operation until 1951. The community has the name of John Promise, a local minister. "Promise" is an English translation of his Native American surname.

== Notable people ==
- Marcella LeBeau - Lakota nurse, military veteran, activist and politician
