= Green Grass Creek =

Stream in South Dakota, U.S.

Coordinates: 45°10′32″N 101°14′34″W

Green Grass Creek is a stream in the U.S. state of South Dakota.

Some say Green Grass Creek takes its name from the unusually green grass on the spring-fed creek, while others believe abundant hay along the watercourse caused the name to be selected.

== See also ==
- List of rivers of South Dakota
