= Cherry Creek, South Dakota =

Cherry Creek, South Dakota Čhaŋpȟá Wakpála
- Unincorporated community
- Location within the state of South Dakota Cherry Creek, South Dakota (the United States)
- Coordinates: 44°36′17″N 101°29′57″W
- Country: United States
- State: South Dakota
- County: Ziebach

Area
  - Total: 0.61 sq mi (1.59 km^{2})
  - Land: 0.61 sq mi (1.59 km^{2})
  - Water: 0 sq mi (0.00 km^{2})
- Elevation: 1,726 ft (526 m)

Population (2020)
  - Total: 282
  - Density: 459.5/sq mi (177.41/km^{2})
- Time zone: UTC-6 (Central (CST))
  - Summer (DST): UTC-5 (CDT)
- ZIP codes: 57622
- Area code: 605
- FIPS code: 46-11540
- GNIS feature ID: 2813069

Cherry Creek (Lakota: Čhaŋpȟá Wakpála; "Chokecherry Creek") is an unincorporated community and census-designated place (CDP) in Ziebach County, South Dakota, United States. The population was 282 at the 2020 census.

The community takes its name from Cherry Creek.

== Demographics ==
Historical population
Census	Pop.	Note	%±
2020	282		—
U.S. Decennial Census

== Education ==
The community is served by Dupree School District 64-2.
