= Fawn Sharp =

President of the Quinault Indian Nation

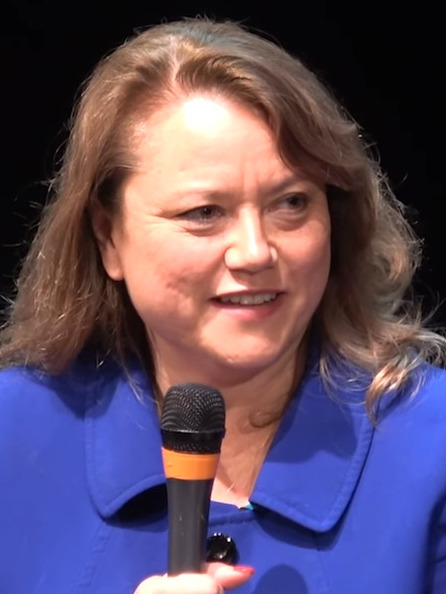
- Sharp in 2019

President of the National Congress of American Indians
- In office October 24, 2019 – November 17, 2023
- Preceded by: Jefferson Keel
- Succeeded by: Mark Macarro

Personal details
- Born: May 20, 1970 (age 56)
- Children: 4
- Education: Gonzaga University (BA); University of Washington (JD)

Fawn Sharp (born May 20, 1970) is a Native American politician, attorney, and policy advocate who served as president of the National Congress of American Indians (NCAI) from 2019 to 2023. Prior to this position, Sharp served as president of the Quinault Indian Nation, as president of the Affiliated Tribes of Northwest Indians, and as vice president of the National Congress of American Indians.

Sharp has also served in a variety of non-tribal governmental capacities, including as an administrative law judge at the Washington Department of Revenue, a governor of the Washington State Bar Association, and as one of Governor Gary Locke's appointed trustees for Grays Harbor College. Following the Cobell v. Salazar decision, Sharp was appointed by the United States Department of the Interior to serve as chair of the National Commission on Indian Trust Administration and Reform.

== Early life and education ==
Sharp was born in Aberdeen, Washington. Sharp graduated from Gonzaga University in 1990 at age 19, and is a University of Washington School of Law 1995 alumna. Following law school, Sharp has since received certificates from the University of Oxford and the University of Nevada.

== Career ==
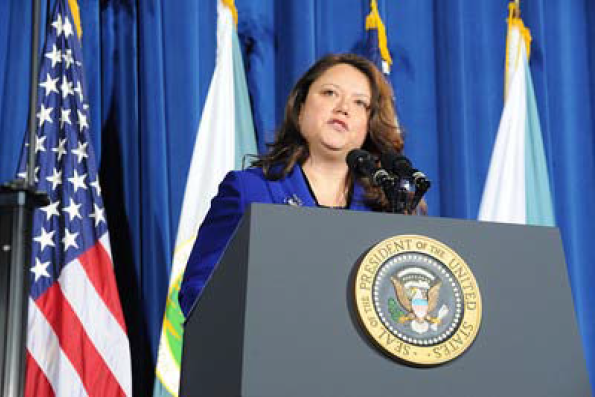
Quinault Indian Nation President Fawn Sharp standing at the podium addressing the 2010 White House Tribal Nations Conference.

Opponents attempted to recall several Quinault officials in November 2015, resulting in the removal of the nation's vice president, but Sharp kept her position. She was elected to her fourth term as Quinault president in March 2015. The Quinault Nation hosted the Canoe Journey in 2013, during her third term.

In November 2023, unable to seek reelection due to term limits, Sharp was succeeded by Mark Macarro, as president of the National Congress of American Indians.

== Diplomatic representative ==
Sharp was the first person issued diplomatic credentials as a tribal leader by the United States Department of State, representing the National Congress of American Indians at 2021 United Nations Climate Change Conference (COP26).

== See also ==
- List of Native American politicians
- Native American women in politics
