= Red Scaffold, South Dakota =

Unincorporated community in South Dakota, U.S.

Coordinates: 44°46′01″N 101°50′38″W

Red Scaffold (Lakota: Wičhágnakapi Šá) is an unincorporated community in Ziebach County, in the U.S. state of South Dakota.

== History ==
A post office called Red Scaffold was established in 1938, and remained in operation until 1943. The community was named after Red Scaffold Creek.
