= Red Scaffold Creek =

River in South Dakota, U.S.

Coordinates: 44°45′50″N 101°50′22″W

Red Scaffold Creek is a stream in the U.S. state of South Dakota.

== History ==
According to tradition, Red Scaffold Creek was named from an incident when two young women who killed one another in a fight over a man were laid at the creek on a red scaffold.

== See also ==
- List of rivers of South Dakota
