= Whitehorse, South Dakota =

- CDP
- Location in Dewey County and the state of South Dakota
- Coordinates: 45°16′29″N 100°54′04″W
- Country: United States
- State: South Dakota
- Counties: Dewey

Area
  - Total: 2.7 sq mi (6.9 km^{2})
  - Land: 2.7 sq mi (6.9 km^{2})
  - Water: 0 sq mi (0 km^{2})
- Elevation: 1,706 ft (520 m)

Population (2020)
  - Total: 106
  - Density: 53/sq mi (20.4/km^{2})
- GNIS feature ID: 2393856

Whitehorse is a census-designated place (CDP) in Dewey County, South Dakota, United States. The population was 106 at the 2020 census.

The community has the name of Native American chieftain and winter count keeper Martin White Horse. The town of White Horse was the site of the first translation of White Horse's winter count from Lakota to English. The winter count dated as far back as 1789 and a copy is on permanent display in nearby Timber Lake.

== Geography ==
According to the United States Census Bureau, the CDP has a total area of 2.7 square miles (6.9 km^{2}), all land.

Whitehorse has been assigned the ZIP code 57661.

== Demographics ==
As of the census of 2000, there were 141 people, 37 households, and 31 families residing in the CDP. The population density was 52.7 inhabitants per square mile (20.3/km^{2}). There were 43 housing units at an average density of 16.1/sq mi (6.2/km^{2}). The racial makeup of the CDP was 2.84% White, 94.33% Native American, and 2.84% from two or more races.

There were 37 households, out of which 64.9% had children under the age of 18 living with them, 32.4% were married couples living together, 37.8% had a female householder with no husband present, and 16.2% were non-families. 16.2% of all households were made up of individuals, and none had someone living alone who was 65 years of age or older. The average household size was 3.81 and the average family size was 4.10.

In the CDP, the population was spread out, with 52.5% under the age of 18, 7.8% from 18 to 24, 28.4% from 25 to 44, 9.2% from 45 to 64, and 2.1% who were 65 years of age or older. The median age was 16 years. For every 100 females, there were 80.8 males. For every 100 females age 18 and over, there were 97.1 males.

The median income for a household in the CDP was $16,250, and the median income for a family was $13,750. Males had a median income of $16,250 versus $16,667 for females. The per capita income for the CDP was $8,266. There were 60.0% of families and 56.6% of the population living below the poverty line, including 61.5% of under eighteens and 40.0% of those over 64.

== Education ==
The CDP is served by Timber Lake School District 20-3.
