= North Eagle Butte, South Dakota =

- Census-designated place
- Location in Dewey County and the state of South Dakota
- Coordinates: 45°00′57″N 101°15′39″W
- Country: United States
- State: South Dakota
- County: Dewey

Area
  - Total: 8.83 sq mi (22.86 km^{2})
  - Land: 8.81 sq mi (22.83 km^{2})
  - Water: 0.012 sq mi (0.03 km^{2})
- Elevation: 2,389 ft (728 m)

Population (2020)
  - Total: 1,879
  - Density: 213.1/sq mi (82.29/km^{2})
- Time zone: UTC−7 (Mountain (MST))
  - Summer (DST): UTC−6 (MDT)
- Area code: 605
- FIPS code: 46-45548
- GNIS feature ID: 2393151

North Eagle Butte is a census-designated place (CDP) in Dewey County, South Dakota, United States, along the 45th parallel. The population was 1,879 at the 2020 census.

== Geography ==
North Eagle Butte is located in western Dewey County. It is bordered to the south by the city of Eagle Butte and by Ziebach County. U.S. Route 212 passes through North Eagle Butte, leading east 71 miles (114 km) to Gettysburg and west 141 miles (227 km) to Belle Fourche. Pierre, the state capital, is 90 miles (140 km) to the southeast.

According to the United States Census Bureau, the CDP has a total area of 9.1 square miles (23.6 km^{2}), of which 0.01 square miles (0.03 km^{2}), or 0.11%, is water.

== Demographics ==
Historical population
Census	Pop.	Note	%±
1980	1,354		—
1990	1,423		5.1%
2000	2,163		52.0%
2010	1,954		−9.7%
2020	1,879		−3.8%
U.S. Decennial Census

At the 2000 census there were 2,163 people, 638 households, and 459 families in the CDP. The population density was 170.5 inhabitants per square mile (65.8/km^{2}). There were 697 housing units at an average density of 54.9 per square mile (21.2/km^{2}). The racial makeup of the CDP was 6.43% White, 0.09% African American, 92.28% Native American, 0.09% Asian, 0.09% Pacific Islander, 0.18% from other races, and 0.83% from two or more races. Hispanic or Latino of any race were 1.39%.

Of the 638 households 45.8% had children under the age of 18 living with them, 27.9% were married couples living together, 31.5% had a female householder with no husband present, and 27.9% were non-families. 23.5% of households were one person and 6.6% were one person aged 65 or older. The average household size was 3.24 and the average family size was 3.81.

The age distribution was 41.7% under the age of 18, 10.1% from 18 to 24, 28.7% from 25 to 44, 14.1% from 45 to 64, and 5.4% 65 or older. The median age was 24 years. For every 100 females, there were 97.4 males. For every 100 females age 18 and over, there were 95.5 males.

The median household income was $21,701 and the median family income was $21,458. Males had a median income of $19,886 versus $20,156 for females. The per capita income for the CDP was $8,175. About 37.5% of families and 39.1% of the population were below the poverty line, including 44.7% of those under age 18 and 51.7% of those age 65 or over.

== Education ==
It is in Eagle Butte School District 20-1, which jointly operates Cheyenne-Eagle Butte School with the Bureau of Indian Education (BIE).
