= Lake Oahe =

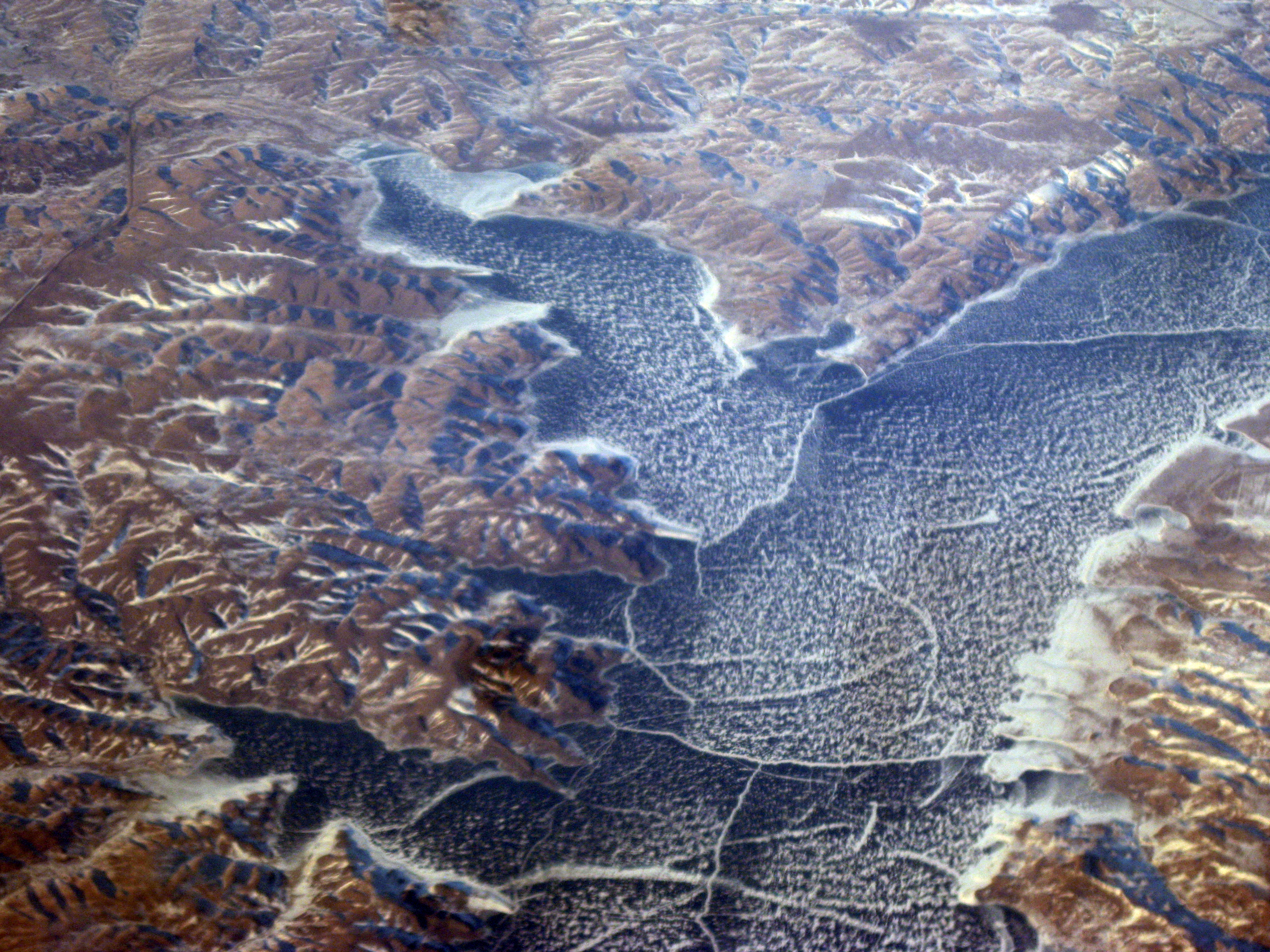
- Lake Oahe in winter, 2009

- Location within South Dakota Location within the United States
- Location: South Dakota and North Dakota, United States
- Coordinates: 44°27′04″N 100°24′08″W at Oahe Dam
- Lake type: reservoir
- Primary inflows: Missouri River, Cheyenne River, Moreau River, Grand River
- Primary outflows: Missouri River
- Basin countries: United States
- Max. length: 231 mi (372 km)
- Surface area: 370,000 acres (150,000 ha)
- Max. depth: 205 ft (62 m)
- Water volume: 23,500,000 acre⋅ft (29.0 km^{3})
- Shore length^{1}: 2,250 mi (3,620 km)
- Surface elevation: 1,647 ft (502 m)
- Settlements: Pierre, South Dakota; Fort Pierre, South Dakota; Mobridge, South Dakota; Pollock, South Dakota; Fort Yates, North Dakota; Cannon Ball, North Dakota; Bismarck, North Dakota
- ^{1} Shore length is not a well-defined measure.

Lake Oahe (/oʊˈwɑː.hiː/) is a large reservoir behind the Oahe Dam on the Missouri River; it begins in central South Dakota and continues north into North Dakota in the United States. The lake has an area of 370,000 acres (1,500 km^{2}) and a maximum depth of 205 ft (62 m). By volume, it is the fourth-largest reservoir in the US. Lake Oahe has a length of approximately 231 mi (372 km) and has a shoreline of 2,250 mi (3,620 km). 51 recreation areas are located along Lake Oahe, and 1.5 million people visit the reservoir every year. The lake is named for the 1874 Oahe Indian Mission.

Lake Oahe begins just north of Pierre, South Dakota and extends nearly as far north as Bismarck, North Dakota. Mobridge, South Dakota is located on the eastern shore of the central portion of the lake. Bridges over Lake Oahe include US Route 212 west of Gettysburg, South Dakota and US Route 12 at Mobridge. The former town of Forest City has been flooded beneath Lake Oahe, about 9 miles west of Gettysburg. Prehistoric archaeological sites have been explored in the area, including Molstad Village near Mobridge. It dates to before the emergence of the Arikara, Hidatsa, and Mandan as separate peoples, and has been designated as a National Historic Landmark.

== Recreation ==
Species of fish in the reservoir include walleye, northern pike, channel catfish, and smallmouth bass. Chinook salmon, native to the Pacific Northwest, are artificially maintained in Lake Oahe and are a popular target for anglers. The lake also supports populations of the endangered pallid sturgeon.

There are 50 public recreation areas that allow access to Lake Oahe. Many of these areas offer boat ramp facilities, marinas, campgrounds, picnic areas, and hiking trails, along with access to hunting and fishing opportunities.

== Indian reservations and cultural resources ==
Both the Cheyenne River Indian Reservation and Standing Rock Sioux Reservation occupy much of the western shoreline of Lake Oahe. Two possible burial sites of Sitting Bull, a Sioux leader, are located along Lake Oahe. One is near Fort Yates, North Dakota, while the other is near Mobridge.

The shoreline and public lands around Lake Oahe contain various artifacts and cultural resources, especially important to many Native American tribes that have historically lived and traveled through the Missouri River Basin and the Lake Oahe area. All artifacts, including fossils and other objects, are prohibited from collecting or damaging. The U.S. Army Corps of Engineers, along with other Federal and Tribal Law Enforcement officers enforce the unauthorized collection, vandalism, and damaging of culturally important sites and artifacts through the Antiquities Act, National Historic Preservation Act, Archaeological Resources Protection Act of 1979, and Native American Graves Protection and Repatriation Act. Penalties for violations can include fines and up to federal prison sentences.

== Forced relocation of Native Americans during construction ==
In the 1960s, the Army Corps of Engineers and Bureau of Reclamation built five large dams on the Missouri River, and implemented the Pick–Sloan Missouri Basin Program, forcing Native Americans to relocate from flooded areas. Over 200,000 acres on the Standing Rock Reservation and the Cheyenne River Reservation in South Dakota were flooded by the Oahe Dam alone. As of 2015, poverty remains a problem for the displaced populations in the Dakotas, who are still seeking compensation for the loss of the towns submerged under Lake Oahe, and the loss of their traditional ways of life.

== Dakota Access Pipeline ==
Lake Oahe became a point of contention in protests to block the Dakota Access Pipeline. The construction project has been controversial for its environmental impacts, and several Native American tribes in the Dakotas and Iowa have opposed the project. These include several Sioux nations and the Meskwaki. In 2016, a group from the Standing Rock Sioux Reservation brought a petition to the U.S. Army Corps of Engineers (USACE) and sued for an injunction to stop the project.

On December 4, 2016, USACE denied the easement that "would allow the Dakota Access Pipeline to cross under Lake Oahe" and Jo-Ellen Darcy, the United States Assistant Secretary of the Army, "said she based her decision on a need to explore alternate routes for the Dakota Access Pipeline crossing". Darcy stated, "that the consideration of alternative routes would be best accomplished through an Environmental Impact Statement with full public input and analysis".

Then-president Donald Trump soon thereafter issued "a memorandum and an executive order asking USACE to expedite its consideration of the company’s application for an easement to start construction". The USACE subsequently "withdrew its call for the environmental study".

On February 7, 2017, the USACE approved an easement through Lake Oahe. On February 9, 2017, the Cheyenne River Sioux filed the first legal challenge to the easement, citing an 1851 treaty and interference with the religious practices of the tribe.

In 2021, the U.S. Court of Appeals for the D.C. Circuit sided with the Standing Rock Sioux and other tribes that there should have been a thorough environmental review (there was only a 2015 preliminary review) for the 2-mile pipeline section below Lake Oahe. In February 2022, the US Supreme Court agreed with this decision. The pipeline's construction remains frozen.

== See also ==
- List of dams and reservoirs in North Dakota
- List of lakes in South Dakota
