= Dewey County, South Dakota =

County in South Dakota, United States

- County
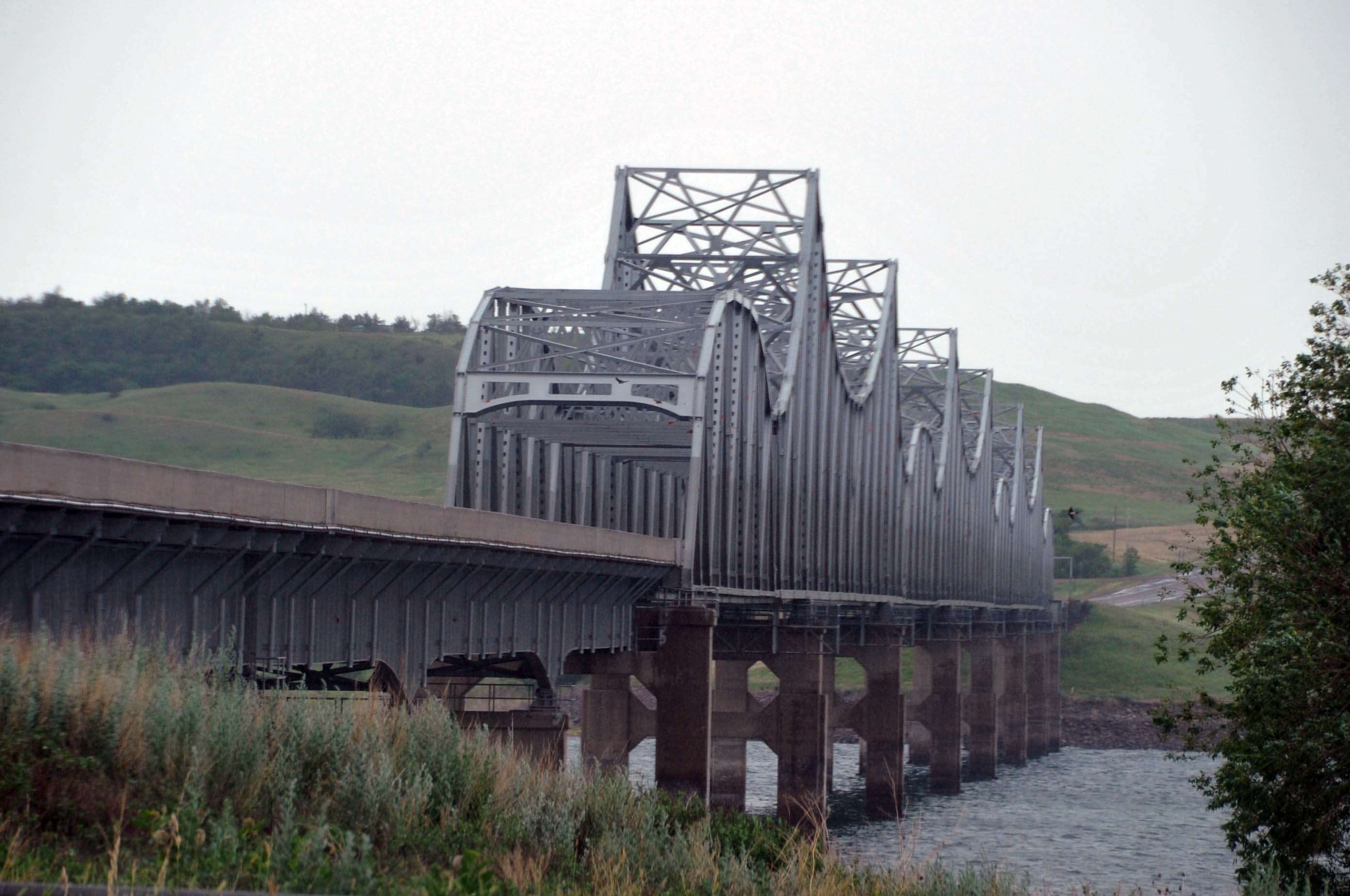
- Forest City Bridge

- Location within the U.S. state of South Dakota
- Coordinates: 45°10′N 100°53′W
- Country: United States
- State: South Dakota
- Created: 1883
- Organized: 1910
- Named for: William P. Dewey
- Seat: Timber Lake
- Largest community: North Eagle Butte

Area
  - Total: 2,445 sq mi (6,330 km^{2})
  - Land: 2,302 sq mi (5,960 km^{2})
  - Water: 143 sq mi (370 km^{2}) 5.8%

Population (2020)
  - Total: 5,239
  - Estimate (2025): 5,419 ▲
  - Density: 2.276/sq mi (0.8787/km^{2})
- Time zone: UTC−7 (Mountain)
  - Summer (DST): UTC−6 (MDT)
- Congressional district: At-large

Dewey County is a county in the U.S. state of South Dakota. As of the 2020 census, the population was 5,239. Its county seat is Timber Lake. The county was created in 1883 and organized in 1910. It was named for William P. Dewey, Territorial surveyor-general from 1873 to 1877.

Almost the entire county lies in the Cheyenne River Indian Reservation. The balance of the county, along its extreme northern county line, lies in the Standing Rock Sioux Reservation. It is one of five South Dakota counties that are contained within Indian reservations.

== Geography ==
The Moreau River flows east-northeasterly through the upper central parts of Dewey County, discharging into the Missouri River near the county's NE corner. Smaller drainages move runoff water northward from the central-eastern portions to the Missouri River, discharging near the community of Promise. A significant arm of the Missouri River forms the county's southeastern border. The county terrain consists of rolling hills, sloping southeastward and dropping off into the Missouri River basin.

The county has a total area of 2,445 square miles (6,330 km^{2}), of which 2,302 square miles (5,960 km^{2}) is land and 143 square miles (370 km^{2}) (5.8%) is water.

The eastern portion of South Dakota's counties (48 of 66) observe Central Time; the western counties (18 of 66) observe Mountain Time. Dewey County is the easternmost of the SD counties to observe Mountain Time.

=== Major highways ===
- U.S. Highway 212
- South Dakota Highway 20
- South Dakota Highway 63
- South Dakota Highway 65

=== Adjacent counties ===
- Corson County – north
- Walworth County – northeast (observes Central Time)
- Potter County – east (observes Central Time)
- Sully County – southeast (observes Central Time)
- Stanley County – south
- Ziebach County – west

=== Protected Areas ===
- Firesteel Dam State Game Production Area
- Isabel Lake State Game Production Area
- Little Moreau State Game Production Area
- Little Moreau State Recreation Area

=== Lakes ===
- Lake Isabel
- Lake Oahe (partial)
- Little Moreau Lake

== Demographics ==
Historical population
Census	Pop.	Note	%±
1910	1,145		—
1920	4,802		319.4%
1930	6,476		34.9%
1940	5,709		−11.8%
1950	4,916		−13.9%
1960	5,257		6.9%
1970	5,170		−1.7%
1980	5,366		3.8%
1990	5,523		2.9%
2000	5,972		8.1%
2010	5,301		−11.2%
2020	5,239		−1.2%
2025 (est.)	5,419	▲	3.4%
U.S. Decennial Census; 1790–1960 1900–1990; 1990–2000 2010–2020

=== 2020 census ===
As of the 2020 census, the county had a population of 5,239, 1,705 households, and 1,180 families, yielding a population density of 2.3 inhabitants per square mile (0.89/km^{2}).

Of the residents, 31.4% were under the age of 18 and 12.0% were 65 years of age or older; the median age was 32.4 years. For every 100 females there were 100.0 males, and for every 100 females age 18 and over there were 97.6 males.

The racial makeup of the county was 16.3% White, 0.2% Black or African American, 78.9% American Indian and Alaska Native, 0.1% Asian, 0.3% from some other race, and 4.2% from two or more races. Hispanic or Latino residents of any race comprised 1.5% of the population.

There were 1,705 households in the county, of which 42.9% had children under the age of 18 living with them and 31.8% had a female householder with no spouse or partner present. About 24.9% of all households were made up of individuals and 8.6% had someone living alone who was 65 years of age or older.

There were 1,923 housing units, of which 11.3% were vacant. Among occupied housing units, 58.4% were owner-occupied and 41.6% were renter-occupied. The homeowner vacancy rate was 0.3% and the rental vacancy rate was 10.3%.

=== 2010 census ===
As of the 2010 census, there were 5,301 people, 1,730 households, and 1,239 families in the county. The population density was 2.3 inhabitants per square mile (0.89/km^{2}). There were 2,002 housing units at an average density of 0.9 units per square mile (0.35 units/km^{2}). The racial makeup of the county was 74.9% Native American, 21.0% white, 0.2% Asian, 0.1% black or African American, 0.2% from other races, and 3.6% from two or more races. Those of Hispanic or Latino origin made up 1.8% of the population. In terms of ancestry, 13.2% were German, 6.5% were Irish, and 0.6% were American.

Of the 1,730 households, 45.9% had children under the age of 18 living with them, 37.6% were married couples living together, 24.2% had a female householder with no husband present, 28.4% were non-families, and 24.6% of all households were made up of individuals. The average household size was 3.05 and the average family size was 3.60. The median age was 30.0 years.

The median income for a household in the county was $33,255 and the median income for a family was $40,500. Males had a median income of $33,942 versus $28,594 for females. The per capita income for the county was $15,632. About 20.5% of families and 30.5% of the population were below the poverty line, including 39.5% of those under age 18 and 13.5% of those age 65 or over.

== Communities ==
=== Cities ===
- Eagle Butte (partial)
- Timber Lake (county seat)

=== Town ===
- Isabel

=== Census-designated places ===
- Green Grass
- La Plant
- Lantry
- North Eagle Butte
- Swift Bird
- Whitehorse

=== Unincorporated communities ===
- Bear Creek
- Firesteel
- Glencross
- Parade
- Promise
- Ridgeview

=== Unorganized territories ===
The county is divided into two areas of unorganized territory: North Dewey and South Dewey.

== Politics ==
Dewey has since the 1990s been a strongly Democratic county in solidly Republican South Dakota. The last Republican to carry the county was Ronald Reagan in his 1984 landslide when he came within 3,761 votes of claiming all fifty states. Before this period, by contrast, Dewey was a Republican-leaning county even for South Dakota. Between its formation and 1984, Dewey had voted Democratic only in the three landslide Democratic wins of 1964, 1936 and 1932, plus for Woodrow Wilson in 1916 when his anti-war policies had strong appeal in the West.

United States presidential election results for Dewey County, South Dakota
Year	Republican		Democratic		Third party(ies)	
Year	No.	%	No.	%	No.	%
1912	0	0.00%	411	42.20%	563	57.80%
1916	352	47.00%	379	50.60%	18	2.40%
1920	880	63.31%	335	24.10%	175	12.59%
1924	956	53.05%	222	12.32%	624	34.63%
1928	1,293	56.39%	996	43.44%	4	0.17%
1932	710	30.51%	1,591	68.37%	26	1.12%
1936	1,012	44.25%	1,216	53.17%	59	2.58%
1940	1,396	56.36%	1,081	43.64%	0	0.00%
1944	913	64.12%	511	35.88%	0	0.00%
1948	864	53.80%	727	45.27%	15	0.93%
1952	1,301	66.34%	660	33.66%	0	0.00%
1956	1,197	56.76%	912	43.24%	0	0.00%
1960	1,168	52.80%	1,044	47.20%	0	0.00%
1964	981	43.79%	1,259	56.21%	0	0.00%
1968	941	52.72%	721	40.39%	123	6.89%
1972	1,008	58.88%	699	40.83%	5	0.29%
1976	820	53.46%	706	46.02%	8	0.52%
1980	1,045	59.14%	600	33.96%	122	6.90%
1984	941	54.49%	772	44.70%	14	0.81%
1988	765	42.76%	1,007	56.29%	17	0.95%
1992	642	36.64%	766	43.72%	344	19.63%
1996	657	33.20%	1,114	56.29%	208	10.51%
2000	761	45.27%	880	52.35%	40	2.38%
2004	921	35.92%	1,606	62.64%	37	1.44%
2008	659	32.64%	1,328	65.78%	32	1.58%
2012	663	34.99%	1,207	63.69%	25	1.32%
2016	723	42.33%	888	51.99%	97	5.68%
2020	790	40.18%	1,131	57.53%	45	2.29%
2024	793	42.38%	1,032	55.16%	46	2.46%

== Education ==
School districts include:

- Dupree School District 64-2
- Eagle Butte School District 20-1
- Timber Lake School District 20-3

== See also ==
- National Register of Historic Places listings in Dewey County, South Dakota
