= Eagle Butte, South Dakota =

- City
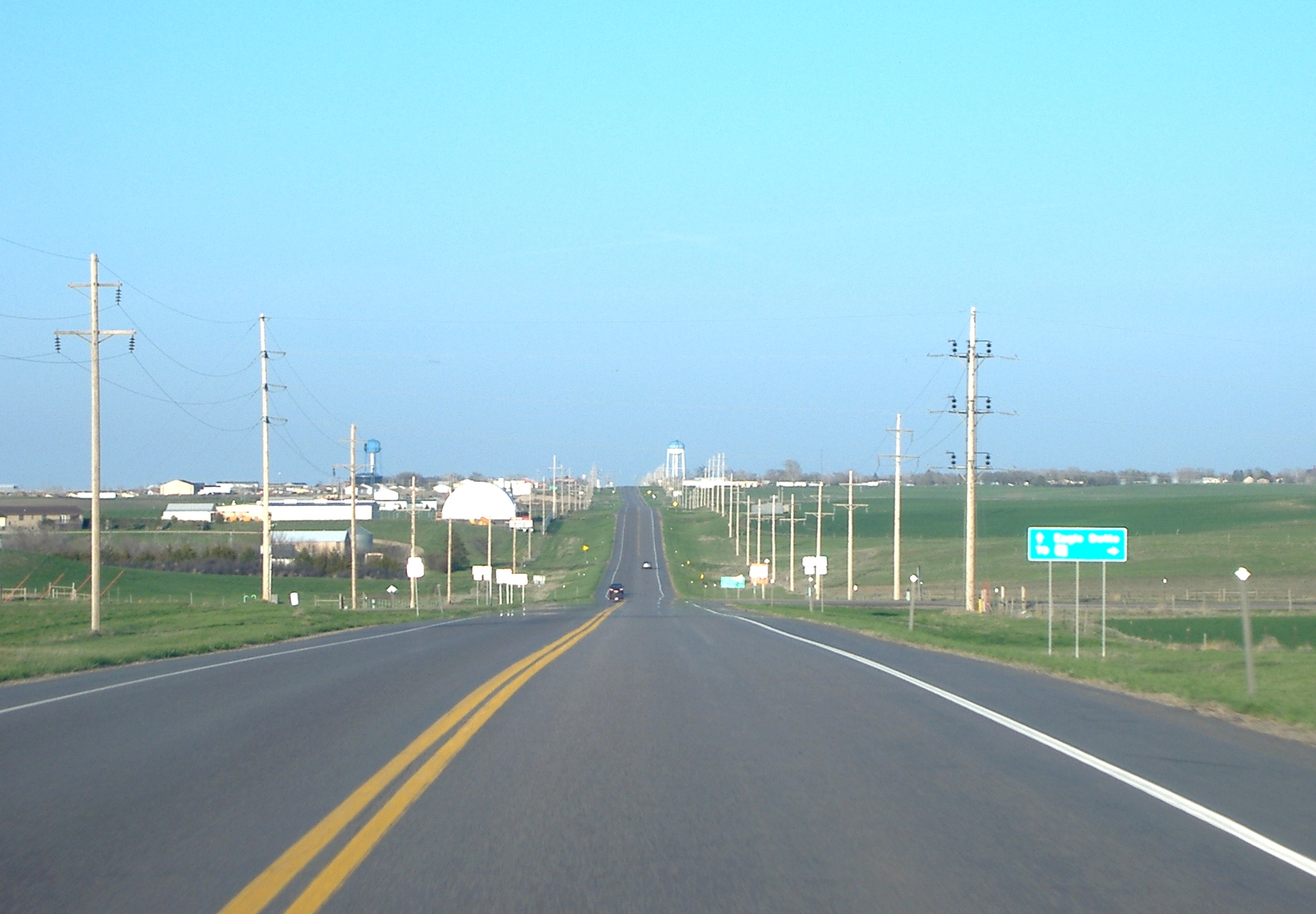
- Entering Eagle Butte on US-212

- Location in Dewey County and the state of South Dakota
- Coordinates: 44°59′38″N 101°13′52″W
- Country: United States
- State: South Dakota
- Counties: Dewey, Ziebach
- Incorporated: 1911

Area
  - Total: 1.47 sq mi (3.80 km^{2})
  - Land: 1.36 sq mi (3.53 km^{2})
  - Water: 0.10 sq mi (0.27 km^{2})
- Elevation: 2,421 ft (738 m)

Population (2020)
  - Total: 1,258
  - Density: 923.9/sq mi (356.73/km^{2})
- Time zone: UTC−7 (Mountain (MST))
  - Summer (DST): UTC−6 (MDT)
- ZIP code: 57625
- Area code: 605
- FIPS code: 46-17620
- GNIS feature ID: 1267361

Eagle Butte is a city in Dewey and Ziebach counties in South Dakota, United States. The population was 1,258 at the 2020 census. It is adjacent to the North Eagle Butte CDP.

== Description ==
Eagle Butte is the tribal headquarters of the Cheyenne River Sioux Tribe on the Cheyenne River Indian Reservation.

The city takes its name from Eagle Butte.

== Geography ==
According to the United States Census Bureau, the city has a total area of 1.17 square miles (3.03 km^{2}), all land.

== Demographics ==
Historical population
Census	Pop.	Note	%±
1920	210		—
1930	387		84.3%
1940	374		−3.4%
1950	375		0.3%
1960	495		32.0%
1970	530		7.1%
1980	435		−17.9%
1990	489		12.4%
2000	619		26.6%
2010	1,318		112.9%
2020	1,258		−4.6%
U.S. Decennial Census

=== 2020 census ===
As of the 2020 census, Eagle Butte had a population of 1,258. The median age was 27.9 years. 38.2% of residents were under the age of 18 and 6.8% of residents were 65 years of age or older. For every 100 females there were 91.8 males, and for every 100 females age 18 and over there were 88.8 males age 18 and over.

There were 386 households in Eagle Butte, of which 50.8% had children under the age of 18 living in them. Of all households, 18.9% were married-couple households, 23.8% were households with a male householder and no spouse or partner present, and 38.9% were households with a female householder and no spouse or partner present. About 24.7% of all households were made up of individuals and 5.1% had someone living alone who was 65 years of age or older.

There were 456 housing units, of which 15.4% were vacant. The homeowner vacancy rate was 0.0% and the rental vacancy rate was 17.5%.

0.0% of residents lived in urban areas, while 100.0% lived in rural areas.

Racial composition as of the 2020 census
Race	Number	Percent
White	90	7.2%
Black or African American	2	0.2%
American Indian and Alaska Native	1,099	87.4%
Asian	4	0.3%
Native Hawaiian and Other Pacific Islander	1	0.1%
Some other race	1	0.1%
Two or more races	61	4.8%
Hispanic or Latino (of any race)	11	0.9%

=== 2010 census ===
As of the census of 2010, there were 1,318 people, 384 households, and 279 families living in the city. The population density was 1,126.5 inhabitants per square mile (434.9/km^{2}). There were 414 housing units at an average density of 353.8 units per square mile (136.6 units/km^{2}). The racial makeup of the city was 6.8% White, 0.3% African American, 89.2% Native American, 0.2% Asian, 0.2% from other races, and 3.3% from two or more races. Hispanic or Latino of any race were 4.3% of the population.

There were 384 households, of which 59.6% had children under the age of 18 living with them, 19.3% were married couples living together, 44.5% had a female householder with no husband present, 8.9% had a male householder with no wife present, and 27.3% were non-families. 24.2% of all households were made up of individuals, and 7.8% had someone living alone who was 65 years of age or older. The average household size was 3.43 and the average family size was 3.90.

The median age in the city was 22.8 years. 41.3% of residents were under the age of 18; 12.1% were between the ages of 18 and 24; 25.5% were from 25 to 44; 16.1% were from 45 to 64; and 4.9% were 65 years of age or older. The gender makeup of the city was 47.3% male and 52.7% female.

=== 2000 census ===
As of the census of 2000, there were 619 people, 227 households, and 140 families living in the city. The population density was 675.4 inhabitants per square mile (260.8/km^{2}). There were 262 housing units at an average density of 285.9 units per square mile (110.4 units/km^{2}). The racial makeup of the city was 18.26% White, 80.29% Native American, and 1.45% from two or more races. Hispanic or Latino of any race were 1.29% of the population.

There were 227 households, out of which 43.2% had children under the age of 18 living with them, 29.1% were married couples living together, 26.9% had a female householder with no husband present, and 37.9% were non-families. 33.5% of all households were made up of individuals, and 12.3% had someone living alone who was 65 years of age or older. The average household size was 2.72 and the average family size was 3.49.

In the city, the population was spread out, with 38.8% under the age of 18, 12.8% from 18 to 24, 25.8% from 25 to 44, 14.1% from 45 to 64, and 8.6% who were 65 years of age or older. The median age was 24 years. For every 100 females, there were 93.4 males. For every 100 females age 18 and over, there were 77.1 males.

As of 2000 the median income for a household in the city was $18,611, and the median income for a family was $20,313. Males had a median income of $23,125 versus $24,167 for females. The per capita income for the city was $9,192. About 41.6% of families and 47.9% of the population were below the poverty line, including 58.9% of those under age 18 and 21.6% of those age 65 or over.

== Education ==
It is in the Eagle Butte School District, which jointly operates Cheyenne-Eagle Butte School with the Bureau of Indian Education (BIE).

Until 2014 there was also a branch of Presentation College located in the town.

== Notable people ==
- Norm Van Brocklin - Pro Football Hall of Fame player and coach.
- Joshua Prager - Author and Journalist
- Earl Rose - Dallas County medical examiner at the time of the Kennedy Assassination.

== See also ==
- List of cities in South Dakota
