= List of dam removals in North Dakota =

This is a list of dams in North Dakota that have been removed as physical impediments to free-flowing rivers or streams.

== Completed removals ==
Dam	Height	Year removed	Location	Watercourse	Watershed
Curfew Creek Dam (Almont Dam)			Almont; 46.7257°N 101.5072°W	Big Muddy Creek	Heart River
Faul-Mathison Dam	35 ft (11 m)	2016	Wells County; 47.5875°N 99.9648°W	James River	James River
Antelope Creek Dam (Schramm Dam)	22 ft (6.7 m)	1979	Hazen; 47.3181°N 101.682°W	Knife River	Knife River
Colt Dam	18.5 ft (5.6 m)	2006	Mercer County	Knife River	Knife River
Halliday Dam			Halliday; 47.3572°N 102.3347°W	Spring Creek	Knife River
Bagley Dam	33.3 ft (10.1 m)		Bowman; 46.05°N 103.9309°W	Tributary to Little Missouri River	Little Missouri River
Sussex Dam	22 ft (6.7 m)		Steele; 47.2714°N 97.7558°W	Maple River	Maple River
Hay Creek Overflow Dam	12 ft (3.7 m)		Burleigh; 46.8378°N 100.752°W	Hay Creek	Missouri River
Porter Dam	11 ft (3.4 m)		Pembina; 48.5688°N 97.6244°W	Cart Creek	Park River
Cavalier Water Supply Dam (Cavalier City Dam)	9.6 ft (2.9 m)		Pembina; 48.7985°N 97.627°W	Tongue River	Pembina River
Christine Dam		2012	Christine; 46.5967°N 96.7648°W	Red River of the North	Red River of the North
Midtown Dam	5.3 ft (1.6 m)	1999	Fargo; 46.8711°N 96.7821°W	Red River of the North	Red River of the North
Fargo North Dam	5 ft (1.5 m)	2002	Fargo; 46.8908°N 96.7711°W	Red River of the North	Red River of the North
Fargo South Dam	4 ft (1.2 m)	2003	Fargo; 46.8317°N 96.7914°W	Red River of the North	Red River of the North
Hickson Dam		2012	Oxbow; 46.6734°N 96.7958°W	Red River of the North	Red River of the North
Kidder Dam	5 ft (1.5 m)	2000	Wahpeton; 46.2874°N 96.6013°W	Red River of the North	Red River of the North
Wolf Creek Dam			Rolette; 48.6639°N 99.9601°W	Wolf Creek	Souris River
