= List of rivers of North Dakota =

This is a list of rivers in the state of North Dakota in the United States.

== Alphabetically ==
- Bois de Sioux River
- Cannonball River
- Cedar Creek
- Cut Bank Creek
- Deep River
- Des Lacs River
- Elm River (North Dakota), tributary of Red River of the North
- Elm River (South Dakota), tributary of James River
- Forest River
- Goose River
- Green River
- Heart River
- James River
- Knife River
- Little Goose River
- Little Heart River
- Little Knife River, tributary of Knife River
- Little Knife River, tributary of Missouri River
- Little Missouri River
- Little Muddy Creek
- Little Muddy River
- Long Creek
- Maple River (North Dakota), tributary of Sheyenne River
- Maple River (South Dakota), tributary of Elm River of South Dakota
- Missouri River
- North Fork Grand River
- Park River
- Pembina River
- Pipestem River
- Red River of the North
- Rush River
- Sheyenne River
- Souris River
- Spring Creek
- Tobacco Garden Creek
- Tongue River
- Turtle River
- White Earth River
- Wild Rice River
- Wintering River
- Yellowstone River

== By tributary ==
=== Missouri River ===
- Little Muddy Creek (mouth in Montana)
- Yellowstone River
- Little Muddy River
- Tobacco Garden Creek
- White Earth River
- Little Knife River
- Little Missouri River
- Knife River
  - Little Knife River
  - Spring Creek
- Heart River
  - Green River
- Little Heart River
- Cannonball River
  - Cedar Creek
- North Fork Grand River
- James River
  - New Rockford Canal
  - Pipestem Creek
  - Elm River
    - Maple River

=== Red River of the North ===
- Bois de Sioux River
- Wild Rice River
- Sheyenne River
  - Maple River
  - Rush River
  - New Rockford Canal
- Elm River
- Goose River
  - Little Goose River
- Turtle River
- Forest River
- Park River
- Pembina River
  - Tongue River

==== Souris River ====
- Antler Creek
- Des Lacs River
- Wintering River
- Deep River
  - Cut Bank Creek
- Long Creek

== See also ==
- List of longest streams of Minnesota
- List of rivers in the United States
