= Patterson Lake =

Patterson Lake may refer to:

== Australia ==
- Patterson Lakes, Victoria

== Canada ==
- Patterson Lake (Ontario) or Stormy Lake, a lake located on north east boundary of the Restoule Provincial Park in Patterson Township, Ontario
- Patterson Lake (British Columbia) or Hook Lake, a lake located south of the community of Tatla Lake, British Columbia and in Patterson Lake Provincial Park
- Patterson Lake (Manitoba), lake located near Olha, Manitoba in the Rossburn Municipality

== United States ==
- Patterson Lake (Arkansas), a lake in Cross County, Arkansas
- a lake near Hell, Michigan
- a lake in Thurston County, Washington
- Edward Arthur Patterson Lake near Dickinson, North Dakota
- the largest lake within the South Warner Wilderness in northern California
- Patterson Lake (Thurston County, Washington) from Thurston County, Washington
- Patterson Lake (Washington) from Washington State Route 510
