= List of dams and reservoirs in North Dakota =

Following is a list of dams and reservoirs in North Dakota.

All major dams are linked below. The National Inventory of Dams defines any "major dam" as being 50 feet (15 m) tall with a storage capacity of at least 5,000 acre-feet (6,200,000 m^{3}), or of any height with a storage capacity of 25,000 acre-feet (31,000,000 m^{3}).

== Dams and reservoirs in North Dakota ==
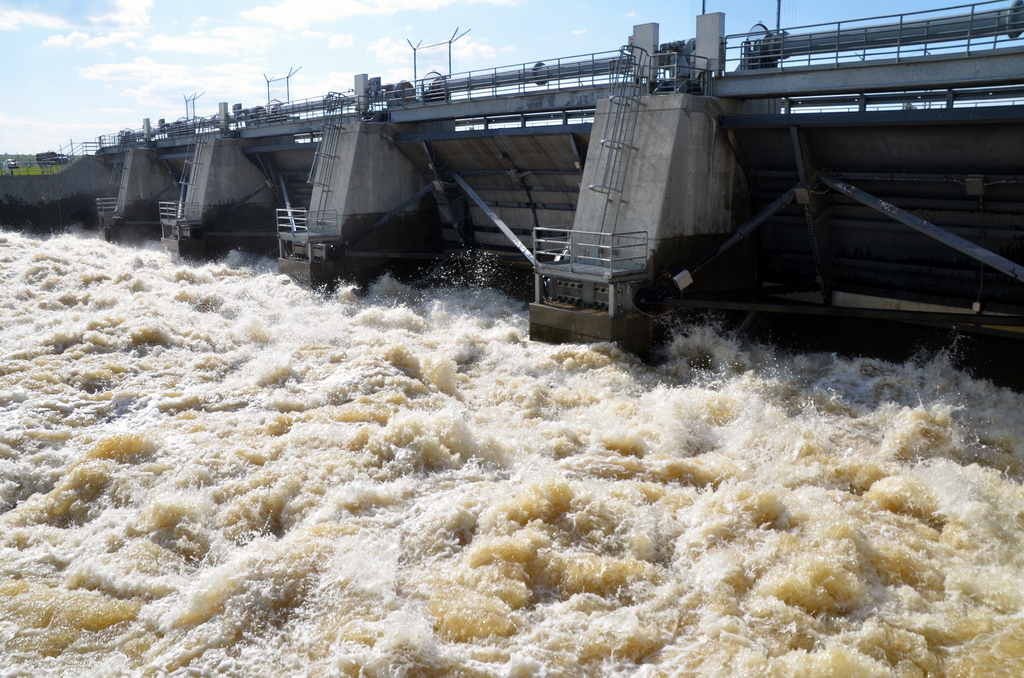
Lake Darling Dam

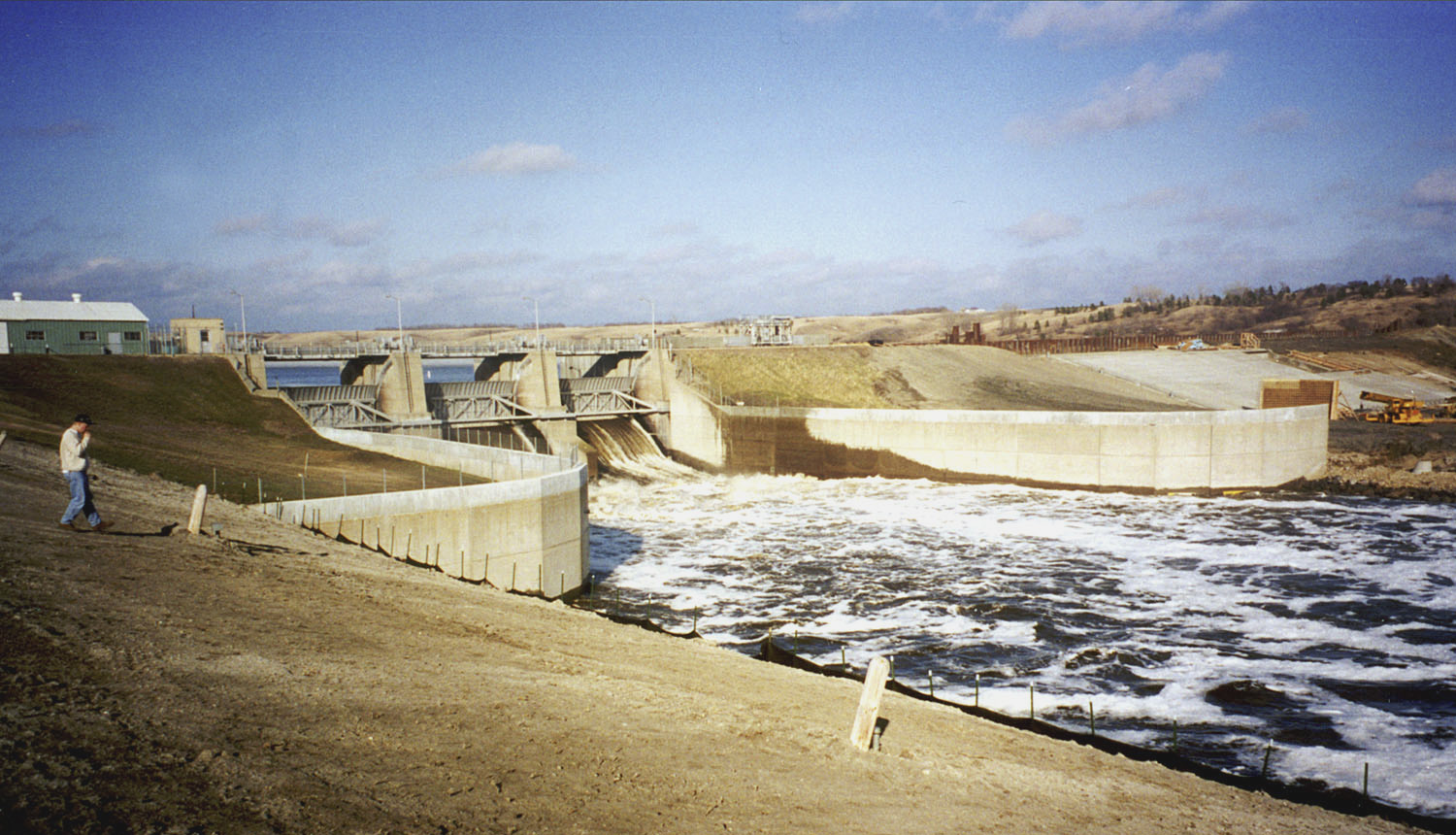
Baldhill Dam

This list is incomplete. You can help Wikipedia by expanding it.

- Baldhill Dam, Lake Ashtabula, Sheyenne River, United States Army Corps of Engineers
- Beaver Creek Dam, seasonal flood control reservoir, Steele County
- Bowman-Haley Dam, Bowman-Haley Reservoir, USACE
- Cottonwood Creek Dam 3, Lake LaMoure, city of LaMoure
- Lake Darling Dam, Lake Darling, Souris River, United States Fish and Wildlife Service
- Dec Lacs#2, part of the Des Lacs National Wildlife Refuge Complex, United States Fish and Wildlife Service
- Dickinson Dam, Edward Arthur Patterson Lake, United States Bureau of Reclamation
- Garrison Dam, Lake Sakakawea, USACE
- Heart Butte Dam, Lake Tschida, USBR
- Jamestown Dam, Jamestown Reservoir, USBR
- Oahe Dam, Lake Oahe (extending into North Dakota from South Dakota), USACE
- Pipestem Dam, Pipestem Lake, USACE
- Renwick Dam, Lake Renwick, Pembina County Water Resource District
- Drayton dam in Drayton, ND – Drayton County
- Riverside dam in Grand Forks, ND - Grand Forks County
- North dam in Fargo, ND - Cass County
- Midtown dam in Fargo, ND - Cass County
- South dam in Fargo, ND - Cass County
- Rock dam by Hickson, ND - Cass County
- Rock dam by Christine, ND - Richland County
- Kidder by Wahpeton, ND - Richland County

== See also ==
- List of dam removals in North Dakota
