= Little Muddy River =

Little Muddy River may refer to the following rivers in U.S.A.:

- Little Muddy River (Illinois)
- Little Muddy River (North Dakota)
