= Zap, North Dakota =

- City
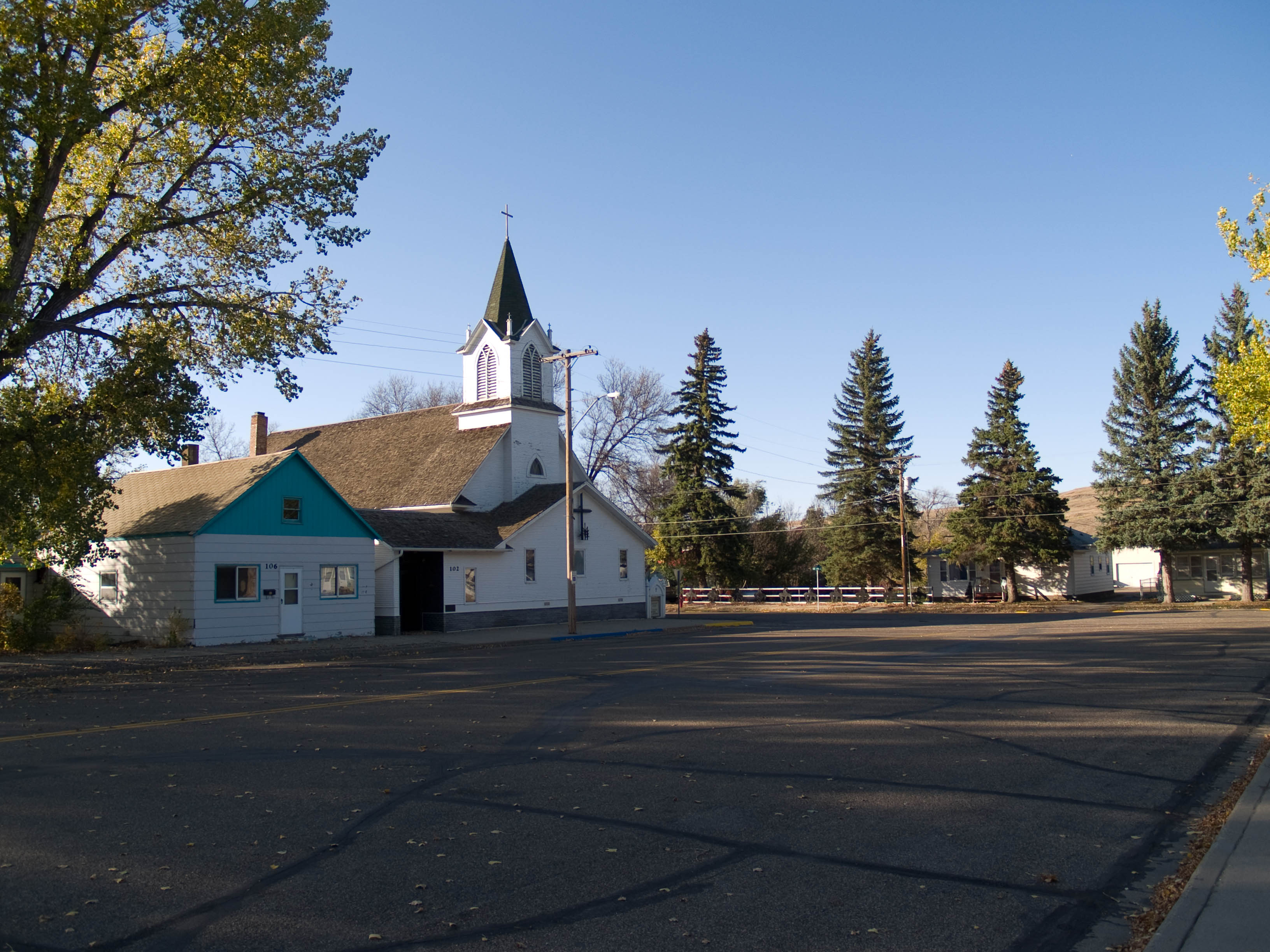
- Immanuel Lutheran Church in Zap

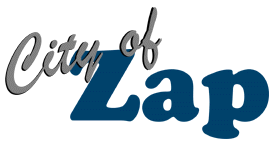
- Logo
- Nickname: "The little town with a big heart"
- Interactive map of Zap, North Dakota
- Location within North Dakota
- Coordinates: 47.2851°N 101.9237°W
- Country: United States
- State: North Dakota
- County: Mercer
- Founded: 1913

Area
  - Total: 1.020 sq mi (2.642 km^{2})
  - Land: 1.019 sq mi (2.638 km^{2})
  - Water: 0.0019 sq mi (0.005 km^{2}) 0.20%
- Elevation: 1,844 ft (562 m)

Population (2020)
  - Total: 221
  - Estimate (2025): 229
  - Density: 217/sq mi (83.8/km^{2})
- Time zone: UTC–6 (Central (CST))
  - Summer (DST): UTC–5 (CDT)
- ZIP Code: 58580
- Area code: 701
- FIPS code: 38-88140
- GNIS feature ID: 1036345

Zap is a city in Mercer County, North Dakota, United States. The population was 221 as of the 2020 census. and was estimated at 229 in 2025.

== History ==
Zap was founded in 1913 along a branch line of the Northern Pacific Railway that began in Mandan. The exact origin of the name is uncertain, though there are numerous unconfirmed theories; some say the town was named after Zapp, which was either a prominent Minnesota banking family or a coal-mining town in Scotland. Zap has been noted for its unusual place name.

== The "Zip to Zap" ==
The town of Zap is probably most widely known for the Zip to Zap riot, which occurred on May 10, 1969. The Zip to Zap was originally intended as a spring break diversion. Between 2,000 and 3,000 people descended upon the town after an article by Chuck Stroup, originally appearing in the North Dakota State University Spectrum newspaper, and then later picked up by the Associated Press, persuaded busloads and chartered planes full of people from around the United States to go there.

The amiable revelry began early with an all-night party in the streets outside an overwhelmed small bar. When the mayor finally exited the bar in the middle of the night and discovered a bonfire on main street and realized the size of the crowd in his tiny town, he panicked and called the governor, William Guy. At dawn, marching in formation and armed with bayonets placed, the National Guard invaded the town and forced the crowd to leave Zap. The event moved to several other towns before the Governor announced that a park in Bismarck would host the crowd. The then-popular rock station, KFYR, and their disc jockeys were in communication with event organizers and falsely reported where the crowd had gone before they arrived, effectively directing all the listeners on which small town and park to proceed to next. In one village, locals cleaned out the Farmers Union of every implement handle in order to patrol their town against the wave of invading hippies and cowboys.

== Geography ==
Zap is located in the prairie country along Spring Creek, a tributary of the Knife River.

According to the United States Census Bureau, the city has a total area of 1.020 square miles (2.64 km^{2}), of which 1.018 square miles (2.64 km^{2}) is land and 0.002 square miles (0.01 km^{2}) (0.20%) is water.

== Climate ==
Climate data for Zap - Beulah Field
Month	Jan	Feb	Mar	Apr	May	Jun	Jul	Aug	Sep	Oct	Nov	Dec	Year
Mean daily maximum °F (°C)	19.6 (−6.9)	21.1 (−6.1)	36.5 (2.5)	52.9 (11.6)	64.6 (18.1)	74.0 (23.3)	83.1 (28.4)	80.8 (27.1)	70.5 (21.4)	55.5 (13.1)	44.3 (6.8)	20.6 (−6.3)	52.0 (11.1)
Mean daily minimum °F (°C)	−3.7 (−19.8)	1.1 (−17.2)	14.7 (−9.6)	30.0 (−1.1)	37.4 (3.0)	48.9 (9.4)	56.1 (13.4)	50.8 (10.4)	41.9 (5.5)	27.6 (−2.4)	19.9 (−6.7)	−0.8 (−18.2)	27.0 (−2.8)
Average precipitation inches (mm)	0.4 (10)	0.4 (10)	0.6 (15)	1.1 (28)	2.0 (51)	3.3 (84)	2.4 (61)	1.8 (46)	1.1 (28)	1.1 (28)	0.5 (13)	0.4 (10)	15.1 (380)
Source: Weatherbase

== Demographics ==
Historical population
Census	Pop.	Note	%±
1920	257		—
1930	406		58.0%
1940	574		41.4%
1950	425		−26.0%
1960	339		−20.2%
1970	271		−20.1%
1980	511		88.6%
1990	287		−43.8%
2000	231		−19.5%
2010	237		2.6%
2020	221		−6.8%
2025 (est.)	229		3.6%
U.S. Decennial Census; 2020 Census

=== 2020 census ===
As of the 2020 census, there were 221 people, 96 households, 64 families residing in the city.

=== 2010 census ===
As of the 2010 census, there were 237 people, 109 households, and 70 families residing in the city. The population density was 225.7 inhabitants per square mile (87.1/km^{2}). There were 135 housing units at an average density of 128.6 per square mile (49.7/km^{2}). The racial makeup of the city was 91.6% White, 3.0% Native American, 1.3% Asian, and 4.2% from two or more races. Hispanic or Latino people of any race were 0.4% of the population.

There were 109 households, of which 24.8% had children under the age of 18 living with them, 47.7% were married couples living together, 8.3% had a female householder with no husband present, 8.3% had a male householder with no wife present, and 35.8% were non-families. 31.2% of all households were made up of individuals, and 11% had someone living alone who was 65 years of age or older. The average household size was 2.17 and the average family size was 2.63.

The median age in the city was 49.1 years. 17.7% of residents were under the age of 18; 9.3% were between the ages of 18 and 24; 18.2% were from 25 to 44; 38.8% were from 45 to 64; and 16% were 65 years of age or older. The gender makeup of the city was 54.0% male and 46.0% female.

=== 2000 census ===
As of the 2000 census, there were 231 people, 101 households, and 68 families residing in the city. The population density was 221.8 inhabitants per square mile (85.6/km^{2}). There were 129 housing units at an average density of 123.8 per square mile (47.8/km^{2}). The racial makeup of the city was 95.24% White, 3.90% Native American, and 0.87% from two or more races.

There were 101 households, out of which 25.7% had children under the age of 18 living with them, 60.4% were married couples living together, 4.0% had a female householder with no husband present, and 31.7% were non-families. 29.7% of all households were made up of individuals, and 14.9% had someone living alone who was 65 years of age or older. The average household size was 2.29 and the average family size was 2.78.

In the city, the population was spread out, with 21.6% under the age of 18, 5.2% from 18 to 24, 25.5% from 25 to 44, 33.3% from 45 to 64, and 14.3% who were 65 years of age or older. The median age was 44 years. For every 100 females, there were 100.9 males. For every 100 females age 18 and over, there were 92.6 males.

The median income for a household in the city was $30,536, and the median income for a family was $34,063. Males had a median income of $30,625 versus $18,125 for females. The per capita income for the city was $16,175. About 5.2% of families and 10.9% of the population were below the poverty line, including 18.6% of those under the age of eighteen and 18.2% of those 65 or over.

== Education ==
Zap is in the Beulah Public School District 27.

Zap formerly had its own school district. In 1994 the district voted to dissolve.
