= Zip to Zap =

North Dakota spring break riot dispersed by the U.S. National Guard

- Date: May 9–11, 1969
- Location: Mainly in Zap, North Dakota
- Caused by: Spring break partying

Parties
| Students; Drunks; Protesters | Police; North Dakota Army National Guard |

Lead figures
| Chuck Stroup | William L. Guy |

The Zip to Zap riot of May 9–11, 1969, in Zap, North Dakota, was originally intended as a spring break diversion. As a result of an article that originally appeared in The Spectrum, student newspaper at North Dakota State University (NDSU), that was later picked up by the Associated Press, between 2000 and 3000 people descended upon the small town of Zap, located in Mercer County in the west central part of the state, nearly 300 miles (480 km) from the NDSU campus. The original gathering is sometimes referred to as the Zap Festival.

Revelers drank copious quantities of alcohol. As the small country town's resources became depleted, the amiable mood began to turn ugly and Zap's residents asked the visitors to leave. Some complied, but others stayed behind. The event became a full-fledged riot. The National Guard was called in and the crowd was dispersed. The Zip to Zap became the first (and to date only) official riot in North Dakota that had to be put down by the National Guard.

== Background ==
Location of Zap within Mercer County and the state of North Dakota

The Zip to Zap was an idea of Chuck Stroup, a student at North Dakota State University (NDSU) in Fargo. Stroup could not afford to attend the more traditional spring break festivities held in Fort Lauderdale, Florida. Therefore, he came up with the idea of what was to become known as the "Zip to Zap a Grand Festival of Light and Love". Stroup placed an advertisement in the student newspaper at NDSU, The Spectrum. His idea was soon embraced by college students throughout the upper midwest of the United States and states as far away as Texas and Florida, thanks to extensive publicity in various college newspapers and in newspapers throughout the nation over the Associated Press wires.

College campuses throughout the United States in 1969 were described as being in chaos as many students rebelled against authority and protested the actions of the U.S. in the Vietnam War and the proliferation of nuclear weapons. The local and national media portrayed this escalation in student protest and resulting violence in a way that may have led some readers and viewers to believe that a cultural, racial, and generational "civil war" was taking place. The National Guard had been called to intervene in over 200 civil disorders relating to the war, racial tensions, and other controversial subjects by late 1969.

North Dakota was far away from the centers of the hippie movement on the coasts of the United States, but this did not mean that the local students did not know what was going on with their peers at schools such as UC-Berkeley. The combination of tension between the students and the established powers, and the local and state governments' lack of experience in dealing with large gatherings of angry and drunk protesters led to the riot that put Zap, North Dakota, across the headlines of the U.S. newspapers and made it the lead story on the CBS Evening News with Walter Cronkite. What started out as a lark turned into a riot that resulted in thousands of dollars of damage.

== Buildup ==
Cryptic ads and articles in various student newspapers throughout the midwest heightened curiosity about the Zip to Zap. A front-page article in the Spectrum read:

Located in the valley of the scenic Knife River, Zap (Zip 58580) has thrown open its arms to students. The beautiful burg's 250 residents welcome us to their shores. Shall we say no to this truly fine gesture of western hospitality? Of course not. On May 10, we and students like us from all over the Midwest will flock to Zap, the Lauderdale of the North (where do you get your suntan, Miami? No, Knife River.)

This article was the first to be picked up by the Associated Press. The residents of Zap were quick to embrace the idea. They saw an opportunity for publicity and to make some money. The two local bars stockpiled a supply of beer and local diners began marketing "Zapburgers" in anticipation of the event. "We thought, well, we'll put ourselves on the map here," remembered Norman Fuchs, the mayor of Zap in 1969. The publicity surrounding the event became quite tremendous. Wham-O used the event to launch a toy called the Zip-Zap. Mayor Fuchs was even photographed playing with the toy. Local rock bands were engaged to play.

The organizers of the Zip to Zap and the government and residents of Zap were caught up in a whirlwind of publicity and seemingly gave little regard to the organization of the event or how to deal with thousands of college-aged students who were out for a good time. Continued publicity further increased the excitement surrounding the Zip to Zap. The Spectrum published a map of Zap and the surrounding area and published an article detailing the bars and cafes of Zap and the scenic beauty of the Knife River Valley. The article concluded with what was to become a prophetic statement, "In addition to these events, a full program of orgies, brawls, freakouts, and arrests is being planned. Do you dare miss it?"

== From party to riot ==
Students began arriving in Zap on Friday, May 9, 1969. They quickly filled the town's two taverns. The demand for beer was such that the tavern owners decided to double the price. This action upset the students, but in the long run it did not matter since all the beer was rapidly consumed. Drunken students took to the streets of the small town. Vomiting and urinating on the streets by the students caused great concern among the locals, who quickly began to fear for their safety. The temperatures fell below freezing and the drunken college students started a bonfire in the center of town, using wood that was left over from a recent demolition project. The townspeople, led by Mayor Fuchs, asked the students to leave: most complied but some did not. What had started out as a spring break get-together quickly turned into the first (and to date only) official riot in North Dakota state history. Local security forces were overwhelmed, and the cafe and one of the bars were completely destroyed.

Governor William Guy called in 500 troops from the North Dakota Army National Guard to quell the riot. Over 1,000 partiers were still in Zap when the guard arrived on the scene at 6:30 am, although just 200 of them were still awake. The guardsmen with fixed bayonets roused the hungover students. There was little resistance to the dispersal. Having been rousted from Zap, the students moved on to nearby Beulah in search of a fresh supply of beer and food. The National Guard followed and with fixed bayonets drove the students along State Highway 200 to Hazen, where they were again moved on at bayonet point. This all took place in front of national media outlets that had gathered at Zap to document the occasion, and the Zip to Zap was the lead item on the CBS Evening News that day. It was also covered by Pravda, the news outlet of the Communist Party of the Soviet Union, and the Stars and Stripes of the United States Armed Forces. Damage from the riot was estimated to be greater than $25,000. These bills were ultimately paid by the student governments of NDSU and the University of North Dakota (UND).

== Aftermath ==
The organizers of the Zip expressed embarrassment with the results of the occasion. Mayor Fuchs believed that only about 300 of the 3000 revelers caused any trouble. Several businesses had to be demolished and rebuilt. A new city hall was built on the site of the abandoned building that had provided fuel for the bonfire. Anniversaries of the event have been celebrated with little to no trouble.

Student protests in North Dakota and Minnesota continued throughout the Vietnam era, but the Zip to Zap remains as the only event that required the use of force by the North Dakota Army National Guard.

Damage claims were settled amiably. Both NDSU in Fargo and UND in Grand Forks imposed a small surcharge on student fees over several years to repay the townspeople for damages not covered by insurance. The town even hosted a 25th anniversary reunion in 1994 which was much better organized and went off without any trouble. Other small towns or former residents in North Dakota joked about planning similar events such as a "Gallop to Gackle", a "March to Medina" or a "Streak to Streeter" to garner similar national attention.

A 50th anniversary celebration was held on May 12, 2019. Chuck Stroup died on May 18, 2024, at the age of 77.
