= Elmwood (Grafton, North Dakota) =

Historic house in North Dakota, United States

- U.S. National Register of Historic Places
- Location within North Dakota Location within the United States
- Location: Grafton, North Dakota
- Coordinates: 48°25′19″N 97°24′18″W
- Area: 0.3 acres (0.12 ha)
- Built: 1895
- Built by: Spencer, C. A. M.
- Architectural style: Late Victorian
- NRHP reference No.: 85000339
- Added to NRHP: February 21, 1985

Elmwood is a house in Grafton, North Dakota that was built in 1895 in Late Victorian architecture. It is located in an oxbow of the Park River. It has also been known as Williamson House. It was listed on the National Register of Historic Places in 1985. The listing included two contributing buildings.

It was built by C.A.M. Spencer, who was North Dakota's second Attorney General.
