= Mapleton, North Dakota =

- City
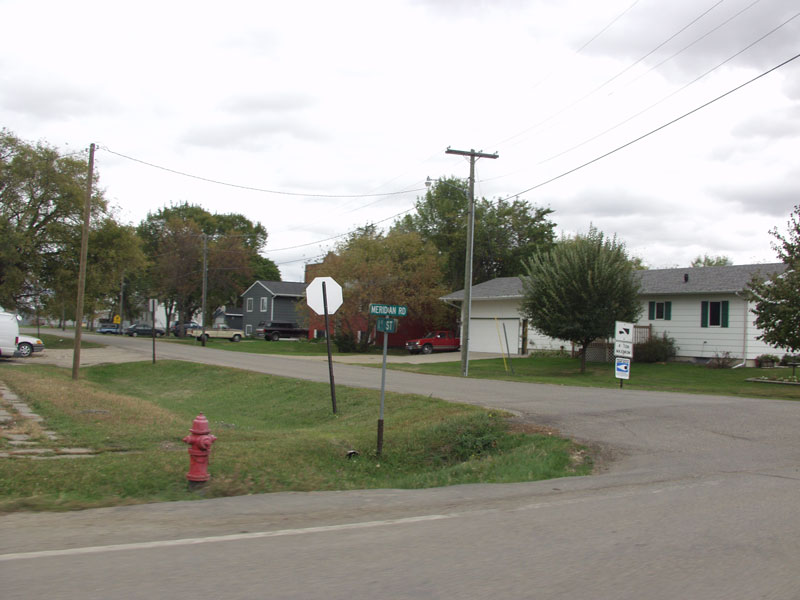
- A residential neighborhood in Mapleton

- Logo
- Motto(s): "A great place to branch out and grow"
- Location of Mapleton, North Dakota
- Coordinates: 46°53′30″N 97°03′12″W
- Country: United States
- State: North Dakota
- County: Cass
- Platted: 1876
- Incorporated: 1884

Government
  - Mayor: Andrew Draeger

Area
  - Total: 3.910 sq mi (10.128 km^{2})
  - Land: 3.910 sq mi (10.128 km^{2})
  - Water: 0 sq mi (0.000 km^{2})
- Elevation: 909 ft (277 m)

Population (2020)
  - Total: 1,320
  - Estimate (2024): 1,476
  - Density: 367/sq mi (141.7/km^{2})
- Time zone: UTC–6 (Central (CST))
  - Summer (DST): UTC–5 (CDT)
- ZIP Code: 58059
- Area code: 701
- FIPS code: 38-50580
- GNIS feature ID: 1036149
- Sales tax: 7.0%
- Website: mapletonnd.com

Mapleton is a city in Cass County, North Dakota, United States. It sits on the banks of the Maple River. The population was 1,320 at the 2020 census. Mapleton serves as a bedroom community of the Fargo-Moorhead metropolitan area. The core cities are ten miles to the east of Mapleton.

== History ==
Mapleton was platted in 1876, soon after the railroad was extended to that point. The city took its name from the Maple River. A post office has been in operation at Mapleton since 1875.

== Geography ==
According to the United States Census Bureau, the city has a total area of 4.00 square miles (10.36 km^{2}), all land.

== Demographics ==
Historical population
Census	Pop.	Note	%±
1890	119		—
1900	322		170.6%
1910	207		−35.7%
1920	198		−4.3%
1930	195		−1.5%
1940	180		−7.7%
1950	169		−6.1%
1960	180		6.5%
1970	219		21.7%
1980	306		39.7%
1990	682		122.9%
2000	606		−11.1%
2010	762		25.7%
2020	1,320		73.2%
2024 (est.)	1,476		11.8%
U.S. Decennial Census; 2020 Census

=== 2020 census ===
Mapleton Racial Composition
Race	Number	Percent
White (NH)	1,169	88.6%
Black or African American (NH)	27	2.0%
Native American (NH)	9	0.7%
Asian (NH)	3	0.2%
Pacific Islander (NH)	0	0.0%
Some Other Race (NH)	0	0.0%
Mixed/Multi-Racial (NH)	68	5.2%
Hispanic or Latino	44	3.3%
Total	1,320	100.0%

As of the 2020 census, there were 1,320 people, 447 households, and 380 families residing in the city. There were 460 housing units. The racial makeup of the city was 89.5% White, 2.0% African American, 0.7% Native American, 0.2% Asian, 0.0% Pacific Islander, 0.8% from some other races and 6.8% from two or more races. Hispanic or Latino of any race were 3.3% of the population.

=== 2010 census ===
As of the 2010 census, there were 762 people, 248 households, and 216 families living in the city. The population density was 190.5 inhabitants per square mile (73.6/km^{2}). There were 264 housing units at an average density of 66.0 per square mile (25.5/km^{2}). The racial makeup of the city was 94.4% White, 3.4% African American, 0.4% Native American, 0.9% from other races, and 0.9% from two or more races. Hispanic or Latino of any race were 3.5% of the population.

There were 248 households, of which 51.2% had children under the age of 18 living with them, 74.6% were married couples living together, 7.3% had a female householder with no husband present, 5.2% had a male householder with no wife present, and 12.9% were non-families. 8.5% of all households were made up of individuals, and 1.2% had someone living alone who was 65 years of age or older. The average household size was 3.07 and the average family size was 3.22.

The median age in the city was 30.4 years. 32.4% of residents were under the age of 18; 7.7% were between the ages of 18 and 24; 31.7% were from 25 to 44; 26% were from 45 to 64; and 2.4% were 65 years of age or older. The gender makeup of the city was 50.8% male and 49.2% female.

=== 2000 census ===
As of the 2000 census, there were 606 people, 191 households, and 160 families living in the city. The population density was 151.4 inhabitants per square mile (58.5/km^{2}). There were 193 housing units at an average density of 48.2 per square mile (18.6/km^{2}). The racial makeup of the city was 98.18% White, 0.17% African American, 1.49% from other races, and 0.17% from two or more races. Hispanic or Latino of any race were 1.98% of the population.

There were 191 households, out of which 56.5% had children under the age of 18 living with them, 72.8% were married couples living together, 7.3% had a female householder with no husband present, and 16.2% were non-families. 12.6% of all households were made up of individuals, and 1.6% had someone living alone who was 65 years of age or older. The average household size was 3.17 and the average family size was 3.51.

In the city, the population was spread out, with 35.8% under the age of 18, 8.7% from 18 to 24, 35.0% from 25 to 44, 17.8% from 45 to 64, and 2.6% who were 65 years of age or older. The median age was 29 years. For every 100 females, there were 102.0 males. For every 100 females age 18 and over, there were 108.0 males.

The median income for a household in the city was $39,038, and the median income for a family was $42,750. Males had a median income of $28,875 versus $19,500 for females. The per capita income for the city was $12,900. About 5.7% of families and 6.0% of the population were below the poverty line, including 7.7% of those under age 18 and 21.4% of those age 65 or over.

== Notable people ==
- Mark Andrews, U.S. representative from North Dakota

== Climate ==
This climatic region is typified by large seasonal temperature differences, with warm to hot (and often humid) summers and cold (sometimes severely cold) winters. According to the Köppen Climate Classification system, Mapleton has a humid continental climate, abbreviated "Dfb" on climate maps.
