= The Spectrum (NDSU) =

North Dakota State University student-run newspaper

- Type: Student newspaper
- School: North Dakota State University
- Founded: 1896
- Website: ndsuspectrum.com

The Spectrum is the student-run newspaper of North Dakota State University in Fargo, North Dakota. The Spectrum has been in publication since 1896. Its oversight committee is the Board of Student Publications (BOSP) made up of a rotating group of four faculty members and five students and receives a portion of the student activity fee as a means to subsidize its production. The Board Of Student Publications is also responsible for hiring and firing the editor in chief.

== History ==
The first recorded issue of the student-published newspaper at North Dakota State University (then North Dakota Agricultural College), titled "The Weekly Spectrum" was published in December 1896. The top story in the first edition praised the invention of the electric light.

In April 1969, a published ad by then-NDSU student body president and subsequent front-page article in The Spectrum resulted in national attention and lead to the Zip to Zap party-turned-riot.
