= Heart Butte Dam =

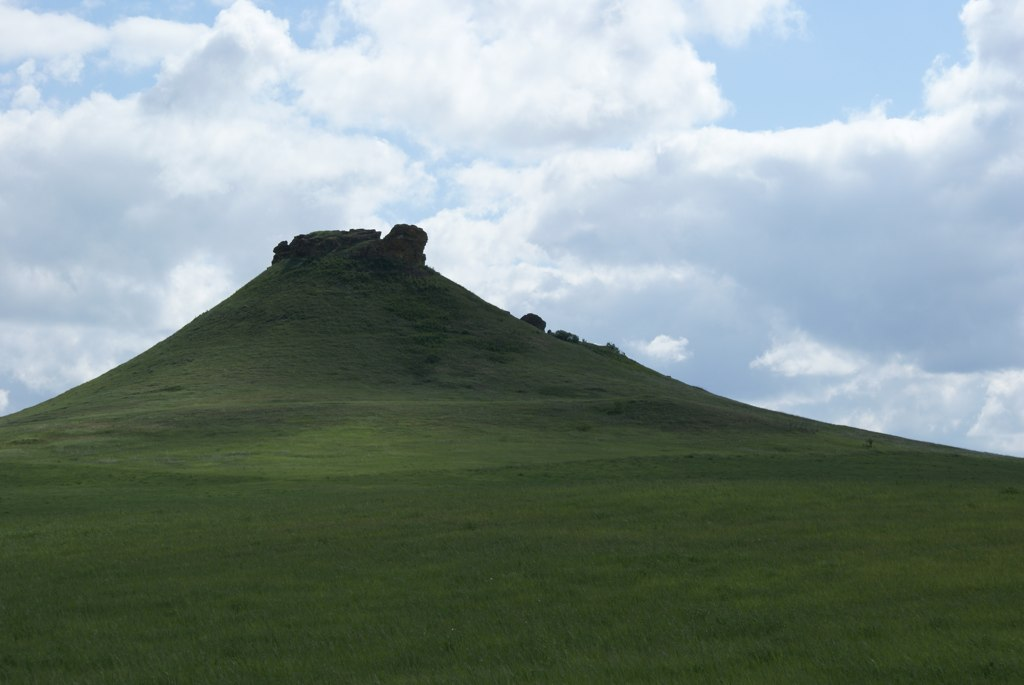
- Heart Butte, namesake of Heart Butte Dam

- Location within North Dakota
- Location: Grant County, North Dakota, United States
- Coordinates: 46°35′49″N 101°48′39″W
- Construction began: 1948; 78 years ago
- Opening date: 1949; 77 years ago
- Operator: United States Bureau of Reclamation

Dam and spillways
- Type of dam: Embankment earth fill
- Impounds: Heart River
- Height: 142 feet (43 m)
- Length: 1,850 feet (560 m)
- Dam volume: 1,140,000 cubic yards (870,000 m^{3})
- Spillways: 1 Morning-glory type
- Spillway capacity: 5,700 cfs at 1,644.4 feet msl pool elevation

Reservoir
- Creates: Lake Tschida
- Total capacity: 223,646 acre-feet (0.275863 km^{3})
- Surface area: 3,397 acres (1,375 ha) (max)
- Maximum water depth: 57 feet (17 m)
- Normal elevation: 2,070 feet (630 m)
- Website; Heart Butte Dam - U.S. Bureau of Reclamation

Heart Butte Dam is a dam in Grant County of southwestern North Dakota. The dam was a project of the United States Bureau of Reclamation completed in 1949, primarily for irrigation and flood control. The earthen dam is 142 feet (43 m) in height and impounds the Heart River.

Lake Tschida is the reservoir created by the dam, with about 3,400 acres (1,400 ha) of water surface, about 55 miles of shoreline, and with a capacity of over 214,000 acre-feet (264,000,000 m^{3}) of water. The name Tschida comes from the first mayor of Glen Ullin, North Dakota, the Vienna-born Michael Tschida Sr., elected in 1906 and a strong proponent of the dam project. The Heart Butte Reservoir State Game Management Area stands on the southern shore of the lake. As the only sizable body of water in the area, it is popular for recreational fishing, camping, boating, and other activities.

== See also ==
- List of dams and reservoirs in North Dakota
- List of dams in the Missouri River watershed
