= North Fork Grand River =

Coordinates: 45°47′35″N 102°18′30″W

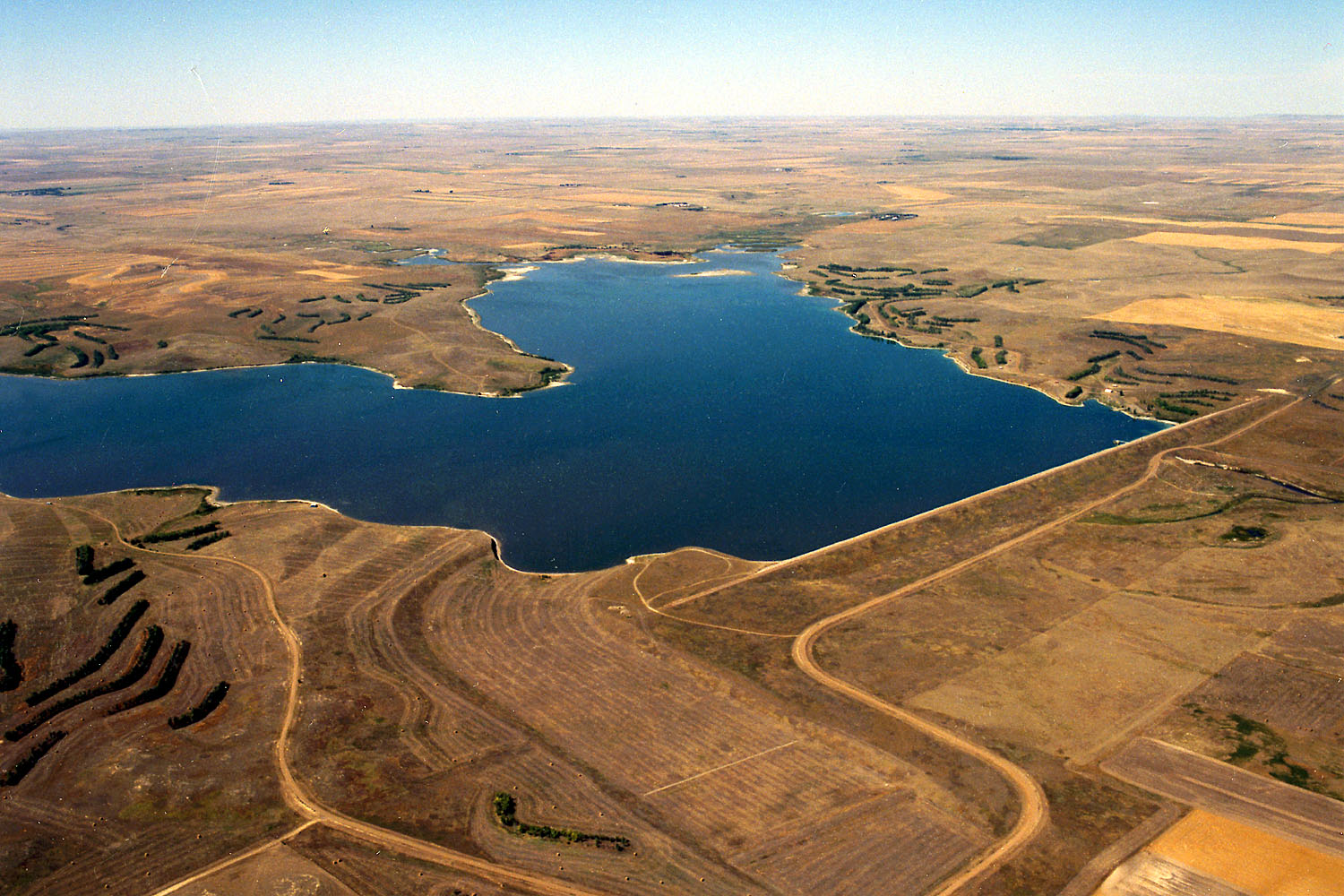
Bowman-Haley Dam and Lake on the North Fork of the Grand River in Bowman County, North Dakota

The North Fork of the Grand River is a tributary of the Grand River, approximately 80 miles (129 km) long, in North Dakota and South Dakota in the United States.

It rises in the Badlands of southwestern North Dakota, in southern Bowman County, and flows ESE, into the Bowman-Haley Reservoir, formed by the Bowman-Haley Dam, then through northwestern South Dakota, past several units of the Grand River National Grassland in northern Perkins County. It joins the South Fork near Shadehill to form the Grand.

== See also ==
- List of rivers of North Dakota
- List of rivers of South Dakota
