= Pipestem Dam =

Dam in North Dakota, United States

Pipestem Dam & Reservoir
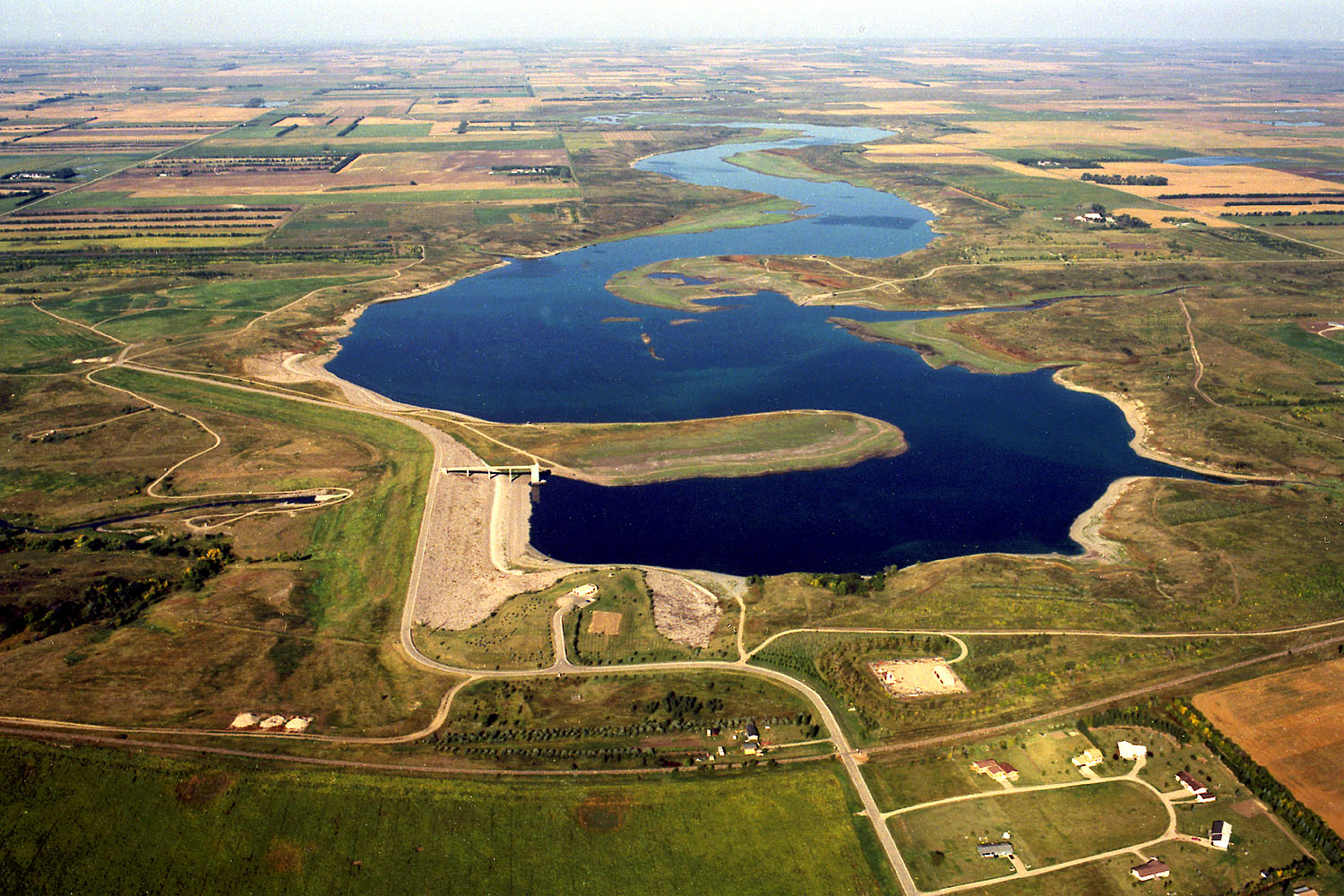
- Pipestem Dam and Reservoir

- Location within North Dakota
- Country: United States
- Location: Stutsman County, North Dakota, United States. Located near Jamestown.
- Coordinates: 46°57′41″N 98°45′6″W
- Status: Operational
- Construction began: 1971
- Opening date: 1973
- Owners: U.S. Army Corps of Engineers, Omaha District

Dam and spillways
- Type of dam: Embankment
- Impounds: Pipestem River
- Height (thalweg): 107.5 ft (33 m)
- Length: 4,000 ft (1,219 m)

Reservoir
- Creates: Pipestem Reservoir
- Total capacity: 8,944 acre⋅ft (11,032,262 m^{3})
- Catchment area: 594 mi (956 km)
- Maximum length: 5.5 mi (9 km)
- Maximum water depth: 30 ft (9 m)
- Website; U.S. Army Corps of Engineers, Omaha District

Pipestem Dam is an embankment dam located in Stutsman County, North Dakota, U.S. The dam was constructed by the U.S. Army Corps of Engineers for flood damage reduction, fish and wildlife enhancement, and recreation. The dam impounds the Pipestem River to create the Pipestem Reservoir, also known as Pipestem Lake. Construction of the dam began in June 1971, and was completed in 1973. The dam is located 4 mi (6 km) north of Jamestown, North Dakota. The dam measures approximately 4,000 feet in length, with a maximum height of 107.5 feet from the stream bed to the top of the dam. The dam and reservoir are managed by the U.S. Army Corps of Engineers, with fish and wildlife resources managed by the North Dakota Game and Fish Department.

William Clairemont, Inc built the dam. Alfred Iverson was the project engineer, and Leonard Helma was the resident engineer during construction.

== See also ==
- Jamestown Dam
- List of dams and reservoirs in North Dakota
- List of dams in the Missouri River watershed
