= Forest River (North Dakota) =

Physical characteristics
- Source
  - location: Confluence of the North Branch and Middle Branch of Forest River, Walsh County near Fordville, North Dakota
  - coordinates: 48°12′45″N 97°48′31″W
  - elevation: 1,101 ft (336 m)
- Mouth
  - location: Confluence with the Red River, Walsh County
  - coordinates: 48°21′29″N 97°08′45″W
  - elevation: 774 ft (236 m)
- Length: 81 mi (130 km)

Basin features
- Progression: Forest River → Red River → Lake Winnipeg → Nelson River → Hudson Bay → Atlantic Ocean
- GNIS ID: 1029003

The Forest River is an 81.0-mile-long (130.4 km) tributary of the Red River of the North in eastern North Dakota in the United States. It rises in Walsh County and flows southeast and east, past the towns of Fordville and Minto, and forms a confluence with the Red approximately 40 miles (64 km) north of Grand Forks.

== See also ==
- List of North Dakota rivers
