= Bowman-Haley Dam =

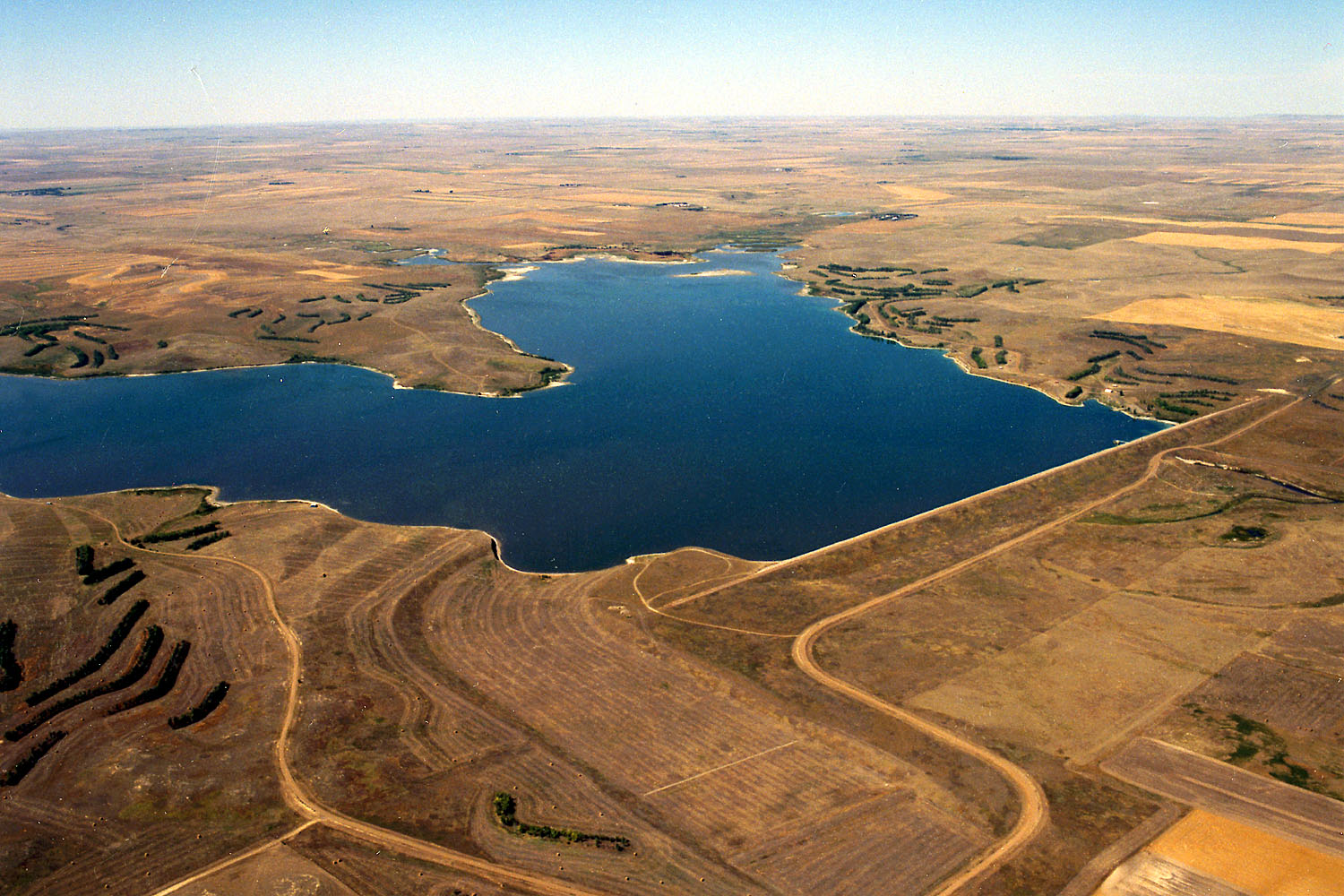

- Location within North Dakota
- Country: United States
- Location: Bowman County, North Dakota
- Coordinates: 45°59′00″N 103°14′42″W
- Status: Operational
- Opening date: 1970
- Owners: U.S. Army Corps of Engineers, Omaha District

Dam and spillways
- Type of dam: Embankment
- Impounds: North Fork of the Grand River
- Height: 79 ft (24 m)
- Length: 5,730 ft (1,747 m)

Reservoir
- Creates: Bowman-Haley Reservoir
- Total capacity: 171,838 acre⋅ft (0.211959 km^{3}) (Maximum Pool)
- Active capacity: 19,780 acre⋅ft (0.02440 km^{3}) (Normal Pool)
- Surface area: 2.7 mi^{2} (7.0 km^{2})
- Normal elevation: 2,760 ft (840 m)

Bowman-Haley Dam is an embankment dam located in Bowman County, North Dakota, in the southwestern part of the state. The dam is just over 2 miles (3.2 km) north of the South Dakota border.

The earthen dam was constructed in 1970 by the United States Army Corps of Engineers to impound the North Fork of the Grand River for flood control, fish and wildlife preservation, recreation, and municipal and industrial water supply. The dam is owned and operated by the Corps of Engineers, with a height of 79 feet (24 m) and a length of 5,730 feet (1,750 m) at its crest.

The reservoir it creates, Bowman-Haley Lake, has a water surface of 2.7 square miles (7.0 km^{2}) and a maximum capacity of 171,838 acre-feet (211,959,000 m^{3}), although its normal storage level of 19,780 acre-feet (24,400,000 m^{3}) is much smaller.

== See also ==
- List of dams in the Missouri River watershed
- List of dams and reservoirs in North Dakota
- Shadehill Dam
- U.S. Army Corps of Engineers
