= Green River (North Dakota) =

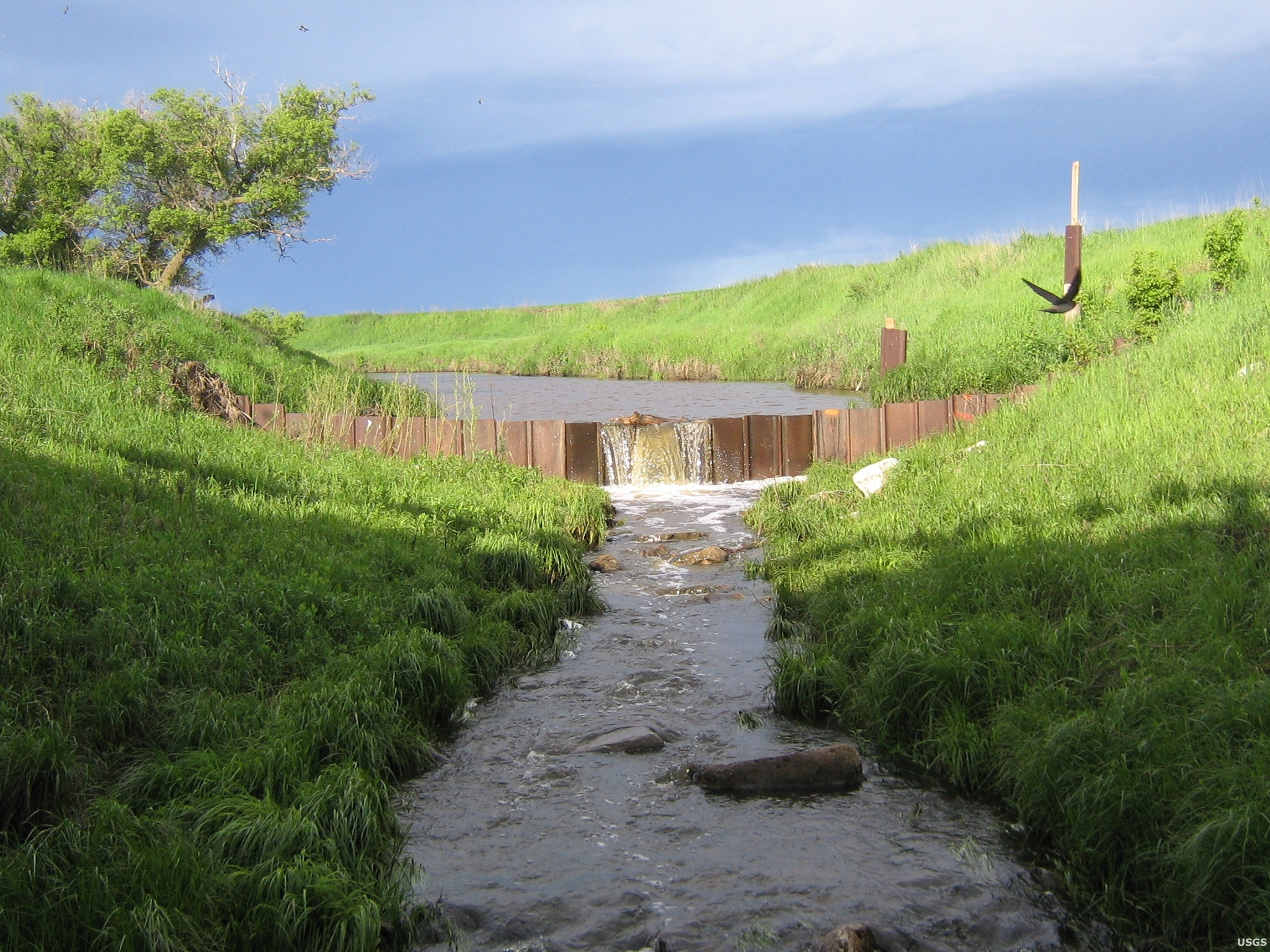
- Green River flowing over a weir near New Hradec.

Location
- Country: United States
- State: North Dakota

Physical characteristics
- Source
  - coordinates: 47°09′00″N 103°16′38″W
  - elevation: 2,763 ft (842 m)
- Mouth: Heart River
  - coordinates: 46°51′43″N 102°35′09″W
  - elevation: 2,293 ft (699 m)

The Green River is a tributary of the Heart River, approximately 20 mi (32 km) long, in western North Dakota in the United States.

It rises in the prairie country of southwestern Billings County, near Saddle Buttes, and flows ESE past New Hradec, and joins the Heart near Gladstone.

== See also ==
- List of North Dakota rivers
