= Jamestown Dam =

Jamestown Dam & Reservoir
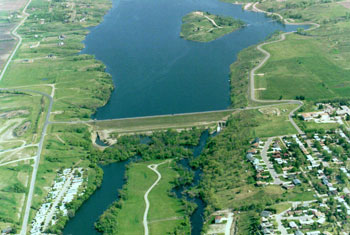
- Jamestown Dam and Reservoir

- Location within North Dakota
- Country: United States
- Location: Stutsman County, North Dakota, United States
- Coordinates: 46.9333°N 98.710°W
- Status: Operational
- Construction began: 1952
- Opening date: 1953
- Construction cost: $1,941,857
- Owner: United States Bureau of Reclamation

Dam and spillways
- Type of dam: Rolled-earth/Embankment
- Impounds: James River
- Height (thalweg): 85 ft (26 m)
- Length: 1,418 feet (432 m)
- Width (base): 215 ft (66 m)

Reservoir
- Creates: Jamestown Reservoir
- Total capacity: 30,000 acre-feet (37,000,000 m^{3}) (Normal pool); Up to 230,000 acre-feet (280,000,000 m^{3}) (Maximum flood-storage pool)
- Surface area: 2,095 acres (8.48 km^{2}) (Normal pool); 13,250 acres (53.6 km^{2}) (Maximum flood-storage pool)
- Maximum water depth: 38 ft (12 m)
- Website; Jamestown Dam Project - U.S. Bureau of Reclamation

The Jamestown Dam is a rolled-earth dam spanning the James River in Stutsman County in the U.S. state of North Dakota, serving the primary purpose of flood control. It is north of the city of Jamestown, North Dakota. Built from April 1952 to September 1953, the dam measures 1,418 feet (432 m) long at the crest and 85 feet (26 m) high. It impounds the James River to form the Jamestown Reservoir. A small islet lies shortly upstream of the dam, where the James River previously split into two channels.

The dam and reservoir rest on a wide plain of shale where the James River cut a canyon up to 1 mile (1.6 km) wide and 100 feet (30 m) deep. The shale (called Pierre Shale) has a dark gray, bedded appearance, and is mostly claystone or siltstone. The valley also contains many traces of alluvium, mainly deposited during the last ice age when the area was heavily glaciated.

== Construction ==
=== Proposal and companies involved ===
The dam was proposed in 1951. The site selected offered the required storage with the smallest dam and with close access to embankment materials; however, the underlying rock and soil was both unstable and pervious. The problems were considered minor because the extended storage need of the reservoir only consisted of the lower 30 feet (9.1 m) of the reservoir. If this had not compensated for the pervious material, the required excavations to stabilize the dam would have been over 120 feet (40 m) to solid bedrock.

Bids for dam construction were submitted by several companies in early 1952. A bid of $1,868,862 was offered by the C.F. Lytle Company of Sioux City, Iowa. This bid was accepted, and the contract was awarded on March 25, 1952 with the notice to proceed received on March 31. The outlet works, which consist of four high-pressure floodgates, were provided by the Hardie-Tynes Manufacturing Company of Birmingham, Alabama, at a cost of $72,995. This contract was awarded on March 10, 1952, and the final shipment of the gates was made during February 1953.

=== Construction process ===
Construction began in April 1952. Excavation for the outlet works began the construction process, with excavation for the 215-foot (66 m) wide foundation trench beginning in mid-May and excavation for the spillway following in early June. This wide trench served to remove as much unstable material from the foundation as possible. This material was determined to be unsuitable for construction of the dam, and eventually discarded. Placement of concrete commenced in late June. Embankment construction began in late July. The upper portion of the upstream slope of the dam was covered with a layer of riprap, and the lower section was protected by a layer of gravel. By the end of 1952, the construction work was approximately 67% complete.

Construction continued at a rapid pace after the beginning of the 1953 season. The upstream conduits for the outlet works were completed in April, and the four high pressure gates were installed beginning April 1. These and the spillway were all complete by August 31, and the main embankment was finished by September 11. On September 18, the final concrete placement occurred, and on September 20, 1953, the dam was completed under the primary contract, 251 days ahead of schedule.

== Dam and reservoir ==
The Jamestown Dam is 1,418 feet (432 m) long at the crest and 85 feet (26 m) above the streambed of the James River. Measured from the deepest point of excavation to the crest, the height is 110 feet (34 m). Its maximum thickness is 730 feet (220 m) from upstream toe to downstream toe. The dam embankment contains 8,667,000 cubic feet (245,400 m^{3}) of material, primarily dirt, rock, gravel and riprap.

The dam's typical release rate is 1,400 cubic feet per second (40 m^{3}/s). The outlet works are controlled by four identical high-pressure gates, 5 feet by 6 feet (1.5 by 1.8 m) in size. Two are for normal use and two are for emergency releases. The maximum capacity of the outlet works is 2,990 cubic feet (85 m^{3}) per second, or 747.5 cubic feet (21.17 m^{3}) per second per gate. The dam also has an emergency inverted-bell spillway, capable of handling 2,930 cubic feet (83 m^{3}) per second. The total release capacity of the dam is 5,920 cubic feet (168 m^{3}) per second.

The outlet works are designed to allow for possible future installation of hydroelectric generators and future municipal water supply.

The Jamestown Reservoir typically holds 30,000 acre-feet (37,000,000 m^{3}) of water, with a normal surface area of 2,095 acres (3.273 mi^{2}). Its maximum capacity is 230,000 acre-feet (280,000,000 m^{3}) and maximum surface area is over 13,250 acres (20.70 mi^{2}).

=== Flood control ===
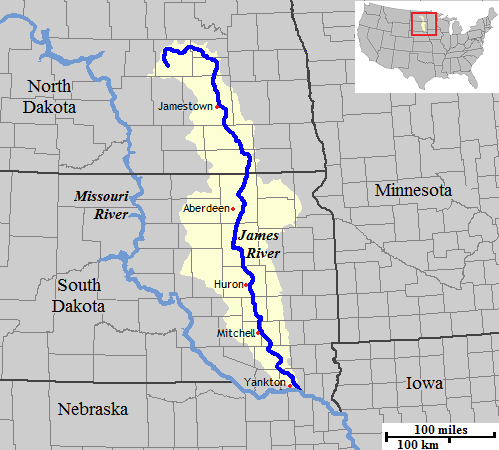
James River watershed

The Jamestown Dam's primary purpose is flood control, and has prevented approximately $36 million in flood-related damages. When it was constructed, certain deficiencies were noted in the foundations for the dam. When the reservoir is at normal levels, the failure risk is small, but as the water level rises, the potential for collapse increases. Floods in May 1969 caused the reservoir to rise to its record level, over 105,000 acre-feet (130,000,000 m^{3}), causing leakage of the dam. This level was not even half the reservoir's maximum capacity of 230,000 acre-feet (280,000,000 m^{3}). In 1993 and 1995, floods caused the lake to rise to within 1 foot (0.3 m) of the 1969 level. An inspection by the Bureau of Reclamation's Dam Safety Department revealed that the dam could potentially fail if the deficiencies were not corrected. As a result, eight relief wells (wells that drain a pervious stratum) were installed in the dam in 1995, and a heavy gravel filter blanket to prevent erosion of embankment materials during seepage was constructed in the spring of 1996.

=== Recreation ===
Besides flood control, the 8-mile (13 km) long, 2,095-acre (3.273 mi^{2}) Jamestown Reservoir was also created for the secondary purpose of recreation, which mainly involves camping, boating, fishing, and birding managed by the Stutsman County Park Board. The lake has approximately 45 miles (72 km) of shoreline and is referred to as "one of the greatest migratory waterfowl flyways in North Dakota." It is stocked with fish by the North Dakota Game and Fish Department. Common fish species in the reservoir include pike, walleye, crappie, bluegill, smallmouth bass, muskie and bullhead.

== Geology ==
The Bureau of Reclamation details the geology of the reservoir area:

The reservoir area is a gently rolling plain with a surface blanket of glacial till over-lying thin-bedded, highly jointed Pierre Shale. In this plain the James River has cut a valley 1,000 to 4,000 feet wide and 50 to 100 feet deep, which forms the reservoir. The overburden of the reservoir area consists of three types:

1) Glacial deposits are chiefly till, a heterogeneous mass of buff to light-brown clay, silt, sand, gravel and boulders. Most of these materials are compact and impermeable.

2) Alluvium deposits occupying the valley floor range from highly plastic clays to sands and grovel with some silt. These deposits range in thickness from a few feet near the base of the valley to as much as 120 feet in the inner gorge near the center of the valley.

3) Deposits of slope-wash and slump materials are minor and occur as thin coverings along the valley slopes. These deposits consist chiefly of materials eroded from glacial drifts.

The bedrock is Pierre Shale which is normally hard, dark gray, thinly bedded and highly jointed claystone or siltstone.

== See also ==
- Pipestem Dam
- List of dams and reservoirs in North Dakota
- List of dams in the Missouri River watershed
- Arrowwood National Wildlife Refuge
