= Tobacco Garden Creek =

Coordinates: 48°06′54″N 103°06′40″W

Tobacco Garden Creek is a tributary of the Missouri River, approximately 30 mi (48 km) long, in northwestern North Dakota in the United States. It rises in the badlands south of the Missouri in McKenzie County, and flows SE, then NNE. It joins the Missouri in Tobacco Garden Bay, an inlet of Lake Sakakawea.

Tobacco Garden Creek marks the western border of the Little Missouri National Grassland protected area.

== See also ==
- List of North Dakota rivers
