= Heart River (North Dakota) =

River in North Dakota, United States

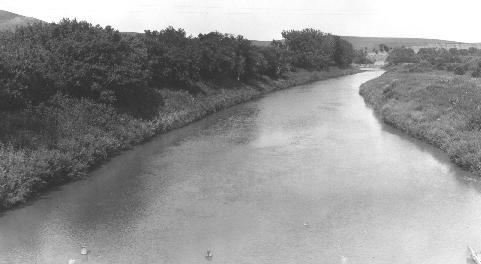
- The Heart River, near Mandan, North Dakota, 1949.

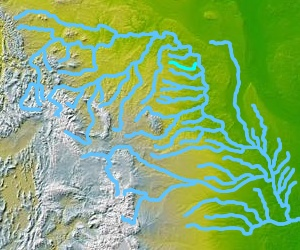
- A map of the Missouri River watershed, highlighting the Heart River.

Location
- Country: United States
- State: North Dakota

Physical characteristics
- Source: Near Saddle Butte
  - location: Belfield, Billings County
  - coordinates: 46°56′13″N 103°13′49″W
  - elevation: 2,740 ft (840 m)
- Mouth: Missouri River
  - location: Mandan, Morton County
  - coordinates: 46°46′03″N 100°50′31″W
  - elevation: 1,624 ft (495 m)
- Length: 180 mi (290 km)
- Basin size: 3,370 sq mi (8,700 km^{2})
- Discharge
  - location: Mandan, about 3 mi (4.8 km) above the mouth
  - average: 269 cu ft/s (7.6 m^{3}/s)
  - minimum: 0 cu ft/s (0 m^{3}/s)
  - maximum: 30,500 cu ft/s (860 m^{3}/s)

Basin features
- Tributaries
  - left: Green River, Missouri River

The Heart River is a tributary of the Missouri River, approximately 180 miles (290 km) long, in western North Dakota, United States.

== Course ==
The Heart River rises in the prairie country of Billings County, in the Little Missouri National Grassland near the south unit of Theodore Roosevelt National Park. It flows generally eastwardly through Stark County to Gladstone, past Belfield and South Heart, through the Patterson Reservoir and past Dickinson.

It is joined by the Green River at Gladstone, and turns east-southeastward into Grant County, passing through Lake Tschida, which is formed by the Heart Butte Dam. Below this dam, the river turns northeastward into Morton County, where it joins the Missouri River at Mandan.

== See also ==
- List of rivers of North Dakota
