= Pipestem River =

Coordinates: 46°57′54″N 98°45′39″W

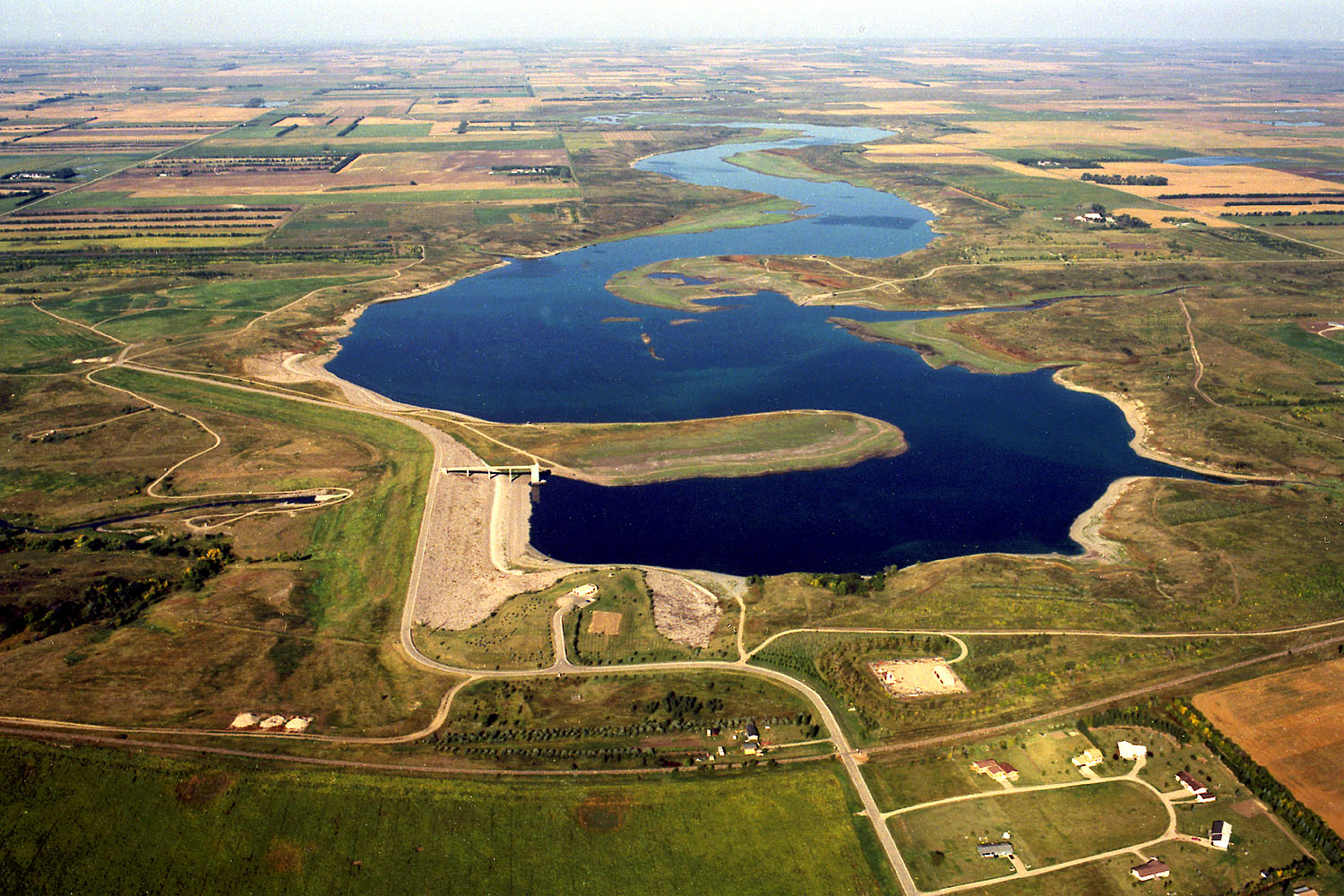
Pipestem Dam and reservoir on the Pipestem River near Jamestown, North Dakota. View is upriver to the west.

The Pipestem River is a short river in east-central North Dakota. The river is also referred to as "Pipestem Creek".

It flows briefly from Wells County into reservoir formed by Pipestem Dam north-northwest of Jamestown, North Dakota, and thence into the James River, the confluence being on the southwest side of the city.
