= Maple River (North Dakota) =

Coordinates: 46°55′56″N 96°55′24″W

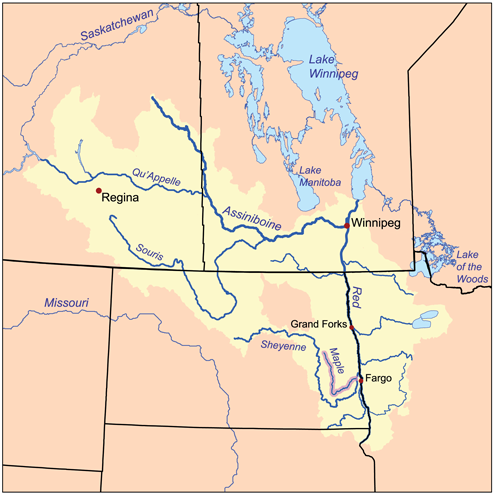
Map of the Red River of the North drainage basin, with the Maple River highlighted

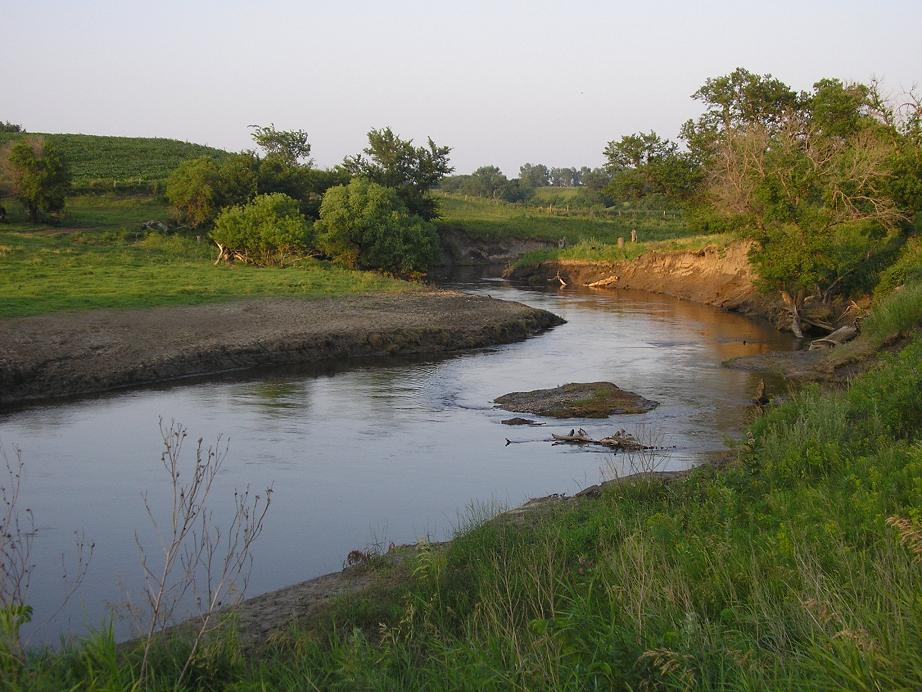
The Maple River south of Chaffee in 2005

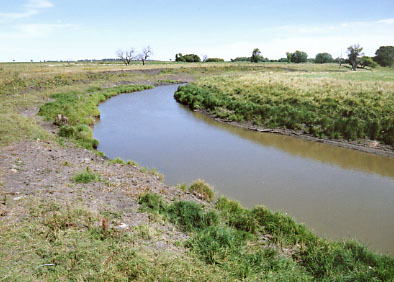
The Maple River near Mapleton in 2004

The Maple River is a tributary of the Sheyenne River, about 198 miles (319 km) long, in the Red River Valley of eastern North Dakota in the United States. Via the Sheyenne River, the Red River of the North, Lake Winnipeg and the Nelson River, the Maple is part of the watershed of Hudson Bay.

== Course ==
The Maple River flows through Steele, Barnes, Cass and Ransom counties. It begins as an intermittent stream near the town of Finley in Steele County, and flows generally southward to Enderlin, where it turns to the northeast and flows past Mapleton. It joins the Sheyenne River about 5 miles (8 km) north of West Fargo, not far upstream of the Sheyenne's confluence with the Red.

At Enderlin it collects a short tributary known as the South Branch Maple River, which flows for its entire length in northern Ransom County.

== See also ==
- List of North Dakota rivers
