= Little Muddy River (North Dakota) =

Coordinates: 48°08′07″N 103°35′32″W

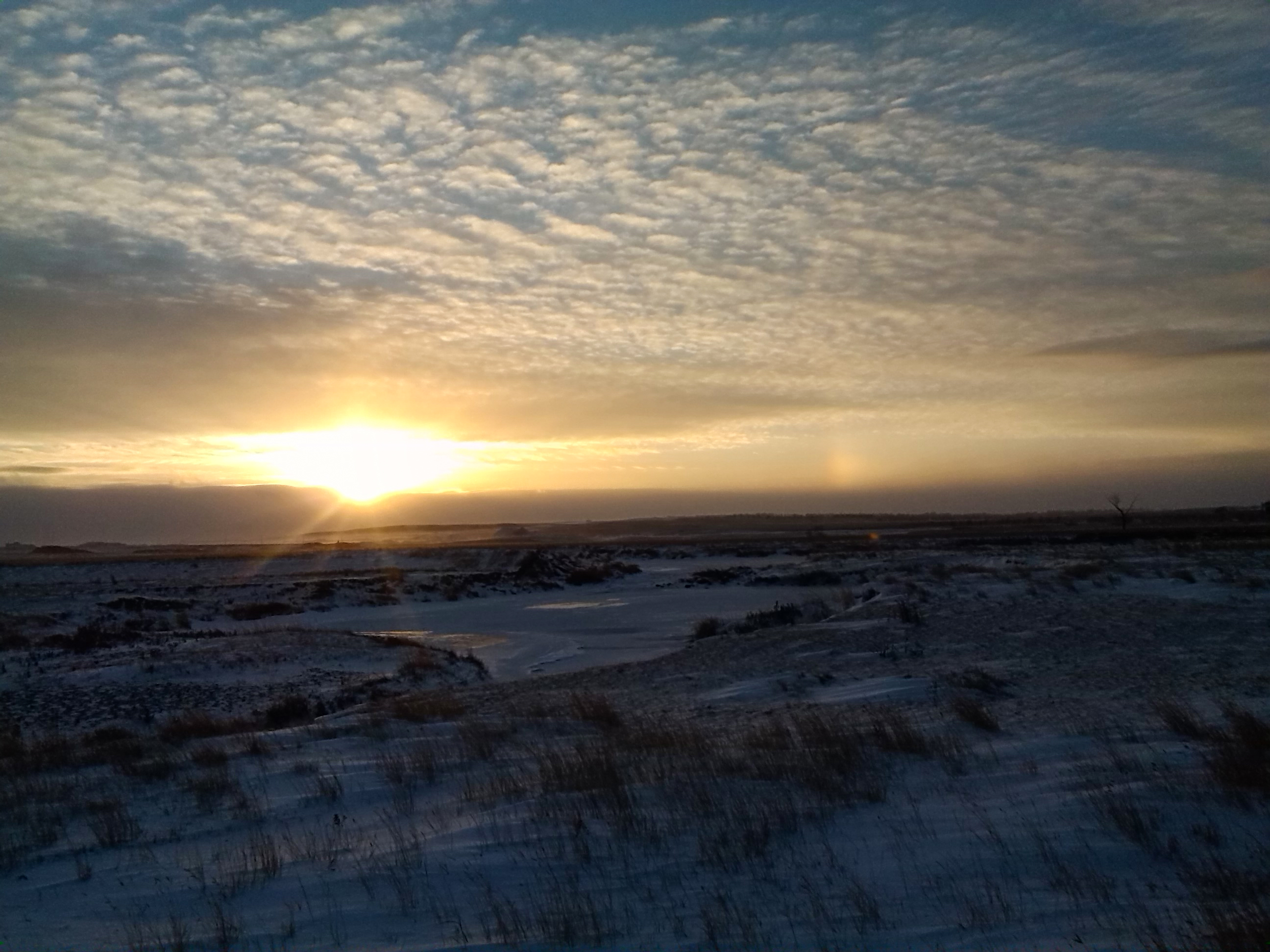
Little Muddy River in winter

The Little Muddy River is a tributary of the Missouri River, approximately 45 miles (72 km) long, in northwestern North Dakota in the United States.

It rises in the prairie country of northern Williams County and flows west, then south, joining the Missouri near Williston.

== See also ==
- List of North Dakota rivers
