= Knife River Bridge =

Historic bridge in North Dakota, United States

- Knife River Bridge near Stanton
- U.S. National Register of Historic Places
- Location within North Dakota Location within the United States
- Nearest city: Stanton, North Dakota
- Coordinates: 47°19′36″N 101°28′7″W
- Area: less than one acre
- Built: 1898
- Built by: Dibley and Robinson
- Architectural style: Pratt through truss
- MPS: Historic Roadway Bridges of North Dakota MPS
- NRHP reference No.: 01000428
- Added to NRHP: April 25, 2001

The Knife River Bridge near Stanton, North Dakota, is a Pratt through-truss structure that was built in 1898. It was listed on the National Register of Historic Places in 2001.

The bridge was damaged in the spring of 1997 and was threatened with demolition. It was repaired and repainted for $126,400, and reopened for use in 1998.
