= Lake Darling Dam =

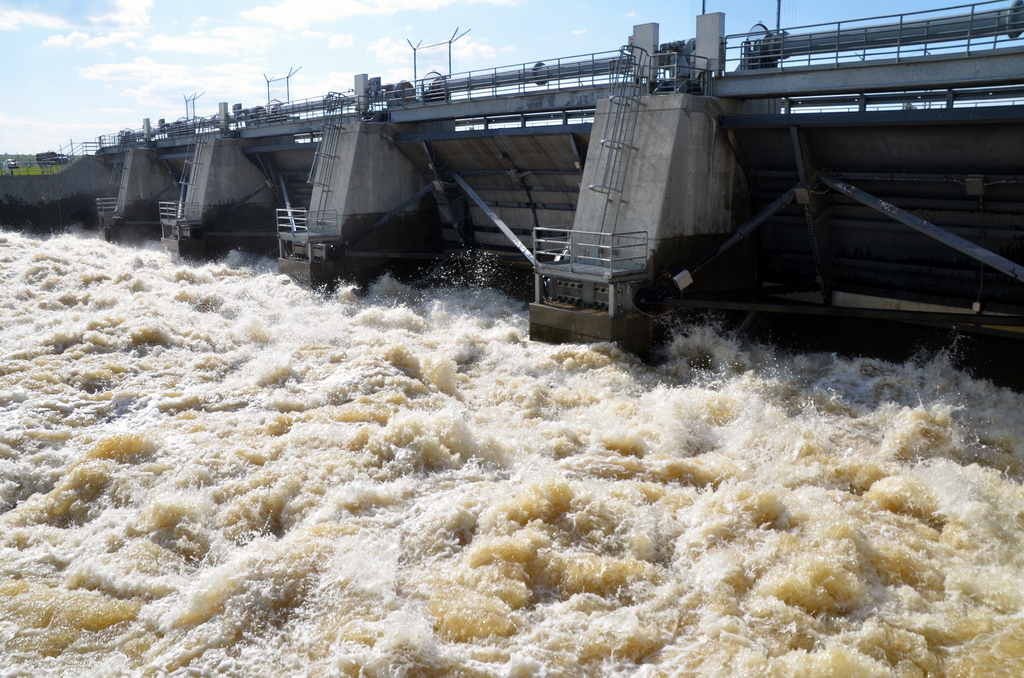
- Releasing flow of 22,000 cu ft/s (620 m^{3}/s) on June 27 during 2011 Souris River flood.

- Location in the United States Location in North Dakota
- Country: United States
- Location: Ward County, North Dakota, northwest of Minot
- Coordinates: 48°27′27″N 101°35′00″W
- Status: Operational
- Opening date: 1936; 90 years ago
- Owner: United States Fish and Wildlife Service

Dam and spillways
- Type of dam: Embankment, earthen
- Impounds: Souris River
- Height: 39 ft (12 m)
- Length: 3,300 ft (1,000 m)

Reservoir
- Creates: Lake Darling
- Total capacity: 110,000 acre⋅ft (135,683,000 m^{3})
- Catchment area: 9,450 mi^{2} (24,500 km^{2})
- Surface area: 15.6 mi^{2} (40.4 km^{2})
- Maximum water depth: 26 ft (8 m)
- Normal elevation: 1,598 feet (487 m) (spillway)

Lake Darling Dam is an earthen embankment dam on the Souris River in the west north central United States, located twenty miles (30 km) northwest of Minot in Ward County, North Dakota. The dam began impounding water in April 1936 and was completed July of that year; it was created for the purposes of water storage and conservation.

It is part of the Upper Souris National Wildlife Refuge and is owned by the United States Fish and Wildlife Service. The dam and lake are named after Jay N. "Ding" Darling, the first director of the Bureau of Biological Survey. Although the dam is located in Ward County, Lake Darling is almost entirely located in Renville County, to its north.

The Fish and Wildlife Service owns and operates the dam during normal conditions. During flood conditions operational control is turned over to the U.S. Army Corps of Engineers according to a 1989 memorandum of understanding. During the 2011 Souris River flood, the dam's reservoir reached maximum levels and releases of 7,500 cu ft/s (210 m^{3}/s) in early June, contributing to flooding downstream. By June 26, releases had reached 24,000 cu ft/s (680 m^{3}/s) and were incrementally reduced thereafter.

== See also ==
- Rafferty Dam
- Grant Devine Dam
