= Spring Creek (North Dakota) =

Coordinates: 47°15′08″N 101°48′05″W

Spring Creek is a tributary of the Knife River, approximately 50 mi (80 km) long, in western North Dakota in the United States.

It rises in the Killdeer Mountains, in Dunn County, and flows east across the prairie country, past Killdeer, Dunn Center, Halliday, Werner, and Zap. It joins the Knife near Beulah.

== See also ==
- List of North Dakota rivers
