= James River (Dakotas) =

River in North Dakota and South Dakota, United States

James River Jim River, Dakota River
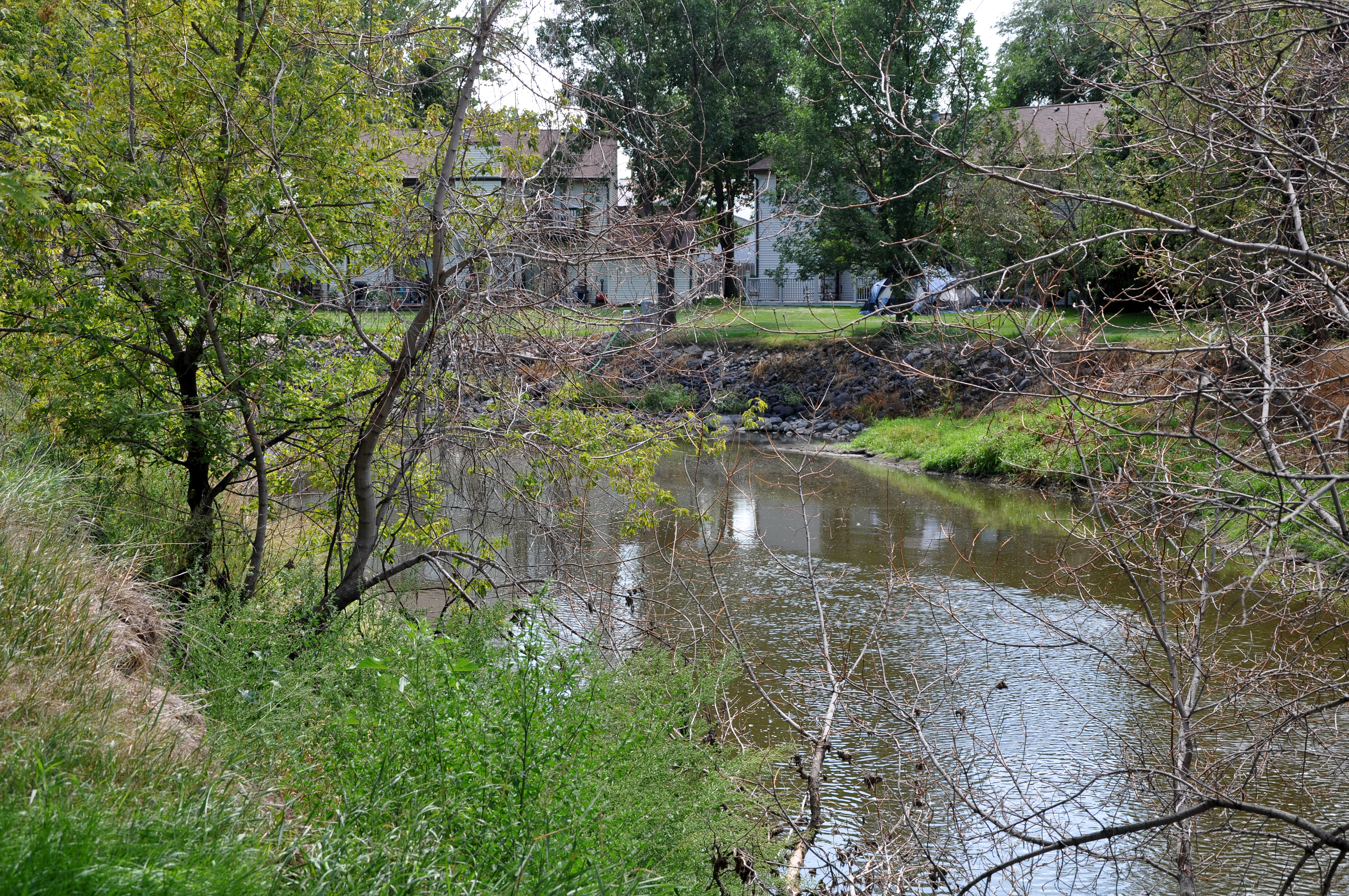
- Flowing through Jamestown, North Dakota

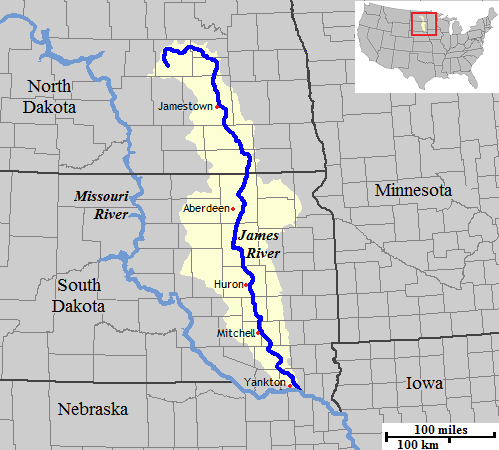
- The course and watershed of the James River.
- Etymology: French: Rivière aux Jacques

Location
- Country: United States
- State: North Dakota, South Dakota
- Cities: Jamestown, ND, Aberdeen, SD, Huron, SD, Mitchell, SD, Yankton, SD

Physical characteristics
- Source: Unnamed pond
  - location: Wells County, North Dakota
  - coordinates: 47°40′47″N 99°50′55″W
  - elevation: 1,603 ft (489 m)
- Mouth: Missouri River
  - location: Yankton County, near Yankton, South Dakota
  - coordinates: 42°52′17″N 97°17′26″W
  - elevation: 1,152 ft (351 m)
- Length: 710 mi (1,140 km)
- Basin size: 20,942 sq mi (54,240 km^{2})
- Discharge
  - location: Scotland, SD
  - average: 646 cu ft/s (18.3 m^{3}/s)
  - minimum: 0 cu ft/s (0 m^{3}/s)
  - maximum: 29,400 cu ft/s (830 m^{3}/s)

Basin features
- Tributaries
  - right: Cain Creek

The James River (also known as the Jim River or the Dakota River) is a tributary of the Missouri River, approximately 710 miles (1,140 km) long, draining an area of 20,653 square miles (53,490 km^{2}) in the U.S. states of North Dakota and South Dakota. About 70 percent of the drainage area is in South Dakota. The river provides the main drainage of the flat lowland area of the Dakotas between the two plateau regions known as the Missouri Coteau and the Coteau des Prairies. This narrow area was formed by the James lobe of the Laurentide Ice Sheet during the last ice age, and as a consequence the watershed of the river is slender and it has few major tributaries for a river of its length.

The James drops approximately 5 inches (130 mm) per 1 mile (1.6 km), and this low gradient sometimes leads to reverse flow. Reverse flow occurs when high inflow from tributaries leads to James River water flowing upstream for several miles above the joining water. This happens most frequently north of Huron, South Dakota.

The river arises in Wells County, North Dakota, approximately 10 mi (16 km) northwest of Fessenden. It flows briefly east towards New Rockford, then generally SSE through eastern North Dakota, past Jamestown, where it is first impounded by a large reservoir (the Jamestown Dam), and then joined by the Pipestem River. It enters northeastern South Dakota in Brown County, where it is impounded to form two reservoirs northeast of Aberdeen.

At Columbia, it is joined by the Elm River. Flowing southward across eastern South Dakota, it passes Huron and Mitchell, where it is joined by the Firesteel Creek. South of Mitchell, it flows southeast and joins the Missouri just east of Yankton.

The James River flows fully across the state of South Dakota, the only river other than the Missouri to do so.

River conditions during normal years include still water on both the James and its tributaries as well as flooding. Floods occur after snowmelt or heavy rains, as water easily breaches the James' low banks, and such floods tend to cover a significant portion of the floodplain. When the river is still, water quality drops.

== History ==
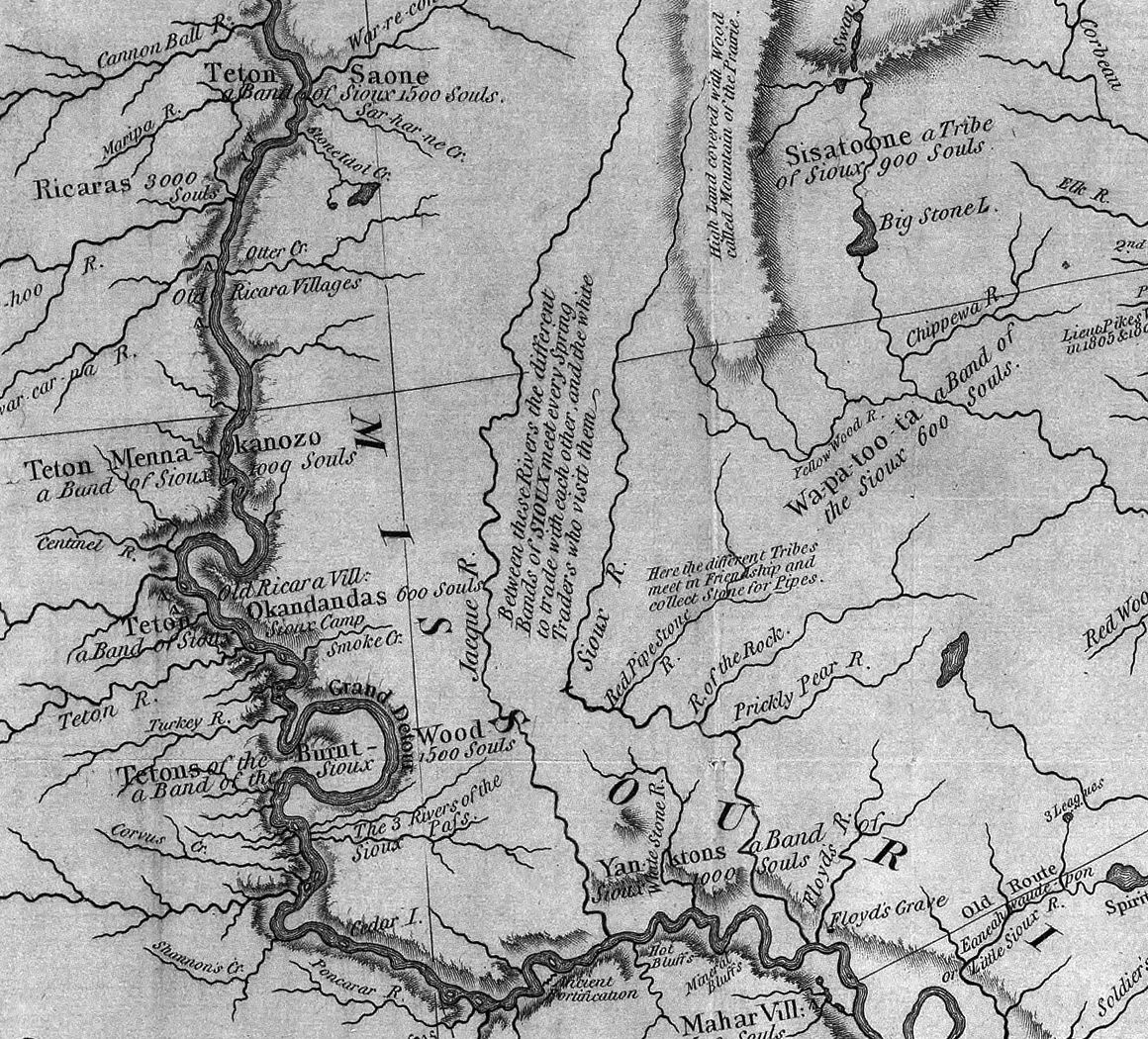
This excerpt from the Lewis and Clark map of 1814 shows the rivers of western Iowa and eastern South Dakota. The James (Jacque) is seen near the left center of the map.

Originally called Itázipokakse Wakpa ("unnavigable river" or "Bow Cutting River") in the Sioux language, the river was given the name Riviere aux Jacques in 1794 by Jean Trudeau, a French trader. This name was subsequently anglicized to James River, which was the name used by local English speakers at the time Dakota Territory was incorporated. However, the Dakota Territory Organic Act of 1861 renamed it the Dakota River. The new name failed to gain popular usage and the river retains its pre-1861 name.

== See also ==
- New Rockford Bridge
- List of longest rivers of the United States (by main stem)
- List of rivers of North Dakota
- List of rivers of South Dakota
