= Patterson Lake (British Columbia) =

Lake in British Columbia, Canada

- Hook Lake
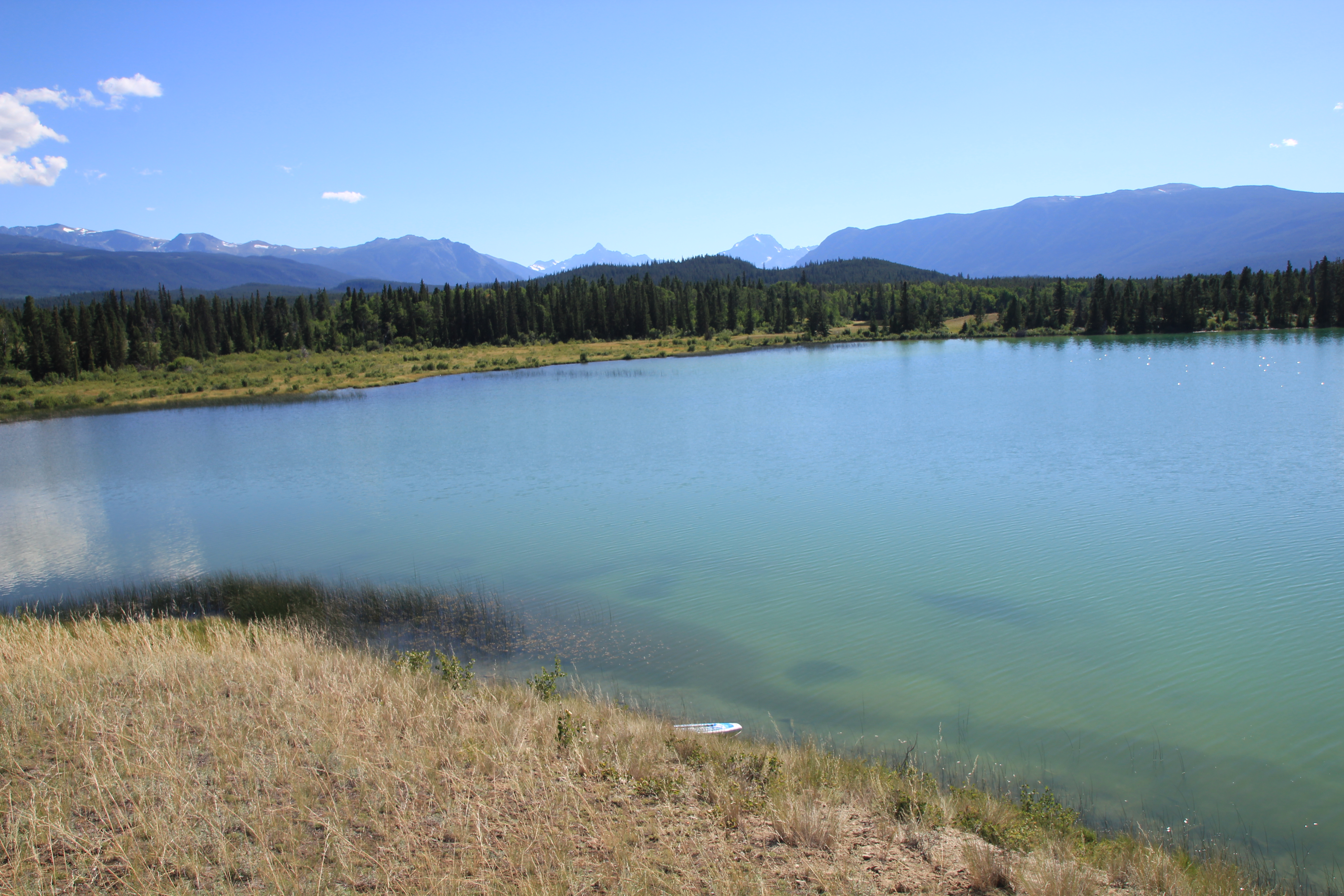
- Looking west over Patterson Lake

- Location within British Columbia
- Location: Chilcotin District, British Columbia
- Coordinates: 51°52′23″N 124°38′39″W
- Primary inflows: Graveyard Springs
- Basin countries: Canada
- Max. length: 5 km (3.1 mi)
- Max. width: 0.8 km (0.50 mi)
- Surface area: 2.16 km^{2} (0.83 sq mi)
- Max. depth: 7.3 m (24 ft)
- Salinity: 9.5 pH
- Shore length^{1}: 12.9 km (8.0 mi)
- Surface elevation: 925 m (3,035 ft)
- Islands: 2 unnamed
- Settlements: none
- ^{1} Shore length is not a well-defined measure.

Patterson lake, also known as Hook Lake, is a shallow lake in the western Chilcotin District of the Central Interior of British Columbia, Canada, located south of Tatla Lake.

This lake on the western edge of the Chilcotin Plateau has no road access and is in the shape of a hook. The outflow is seasonal, and flows down to Tatla Lake Creek to the north. In 2013 the lake and surrounding land was turned into Patterson Lake Provincial Park. The park is utilized in the winter with a network of cross country ski trails.

== See also ==
- List of lakes of British Columbia
