= Dickinson Dam =

- Interactive map of Dickinson Dam
- Country: United States
- Location: Stark County, North Dakota
- Coordinates: 46°52′03″N 102°49′35″W
- Status: Operational
- Opening date: May 1950
- Designed by: United States Bureau of Reclamation

Dam and spillways
- Height (foundation): 65 ft (20 m)
- Length: 2,275 ft (693 m)

Reservoir
- Creates: Edward Arthur Patterson Lake
- Surface area: 956 acres (387 ha)
- Maximum water depth: 26 ft (7.9 m)
- Normal elevation: 2,418 ft (737 m)

location of Dickinson, North Dakota

Dickinson Dam is a dam in Stark County, North Dakota, one and a half miles west of the town of Dickinson.

The earthen dam was completed by the United States Bureau of Reclamation in May 1950, impounding the Heart River. The dam has a structural height of 65 feet (20 m) and is 2,275 feet (693 m) along its crest. The dam was expanded in 1981, and an auxiliary spillway with bascule gates added.

The dam creates the Dickinson Reservoir, renamed Edward Arthur Patterson Lake in 1959. The reservoir holds 8,612 acre-feet (10,623,000 m^{3}) of water, used for agricultural irrigation, flood control, and for Dickinson's municipal needs. No hydroelectric power is generated here. The lake covers about 1,190 acres (480 ha) surface acres and 22 miles (35 km) of shoreline. Recreation available at the lake includes camping, fishing and boating.
