= Park River (North Dakota) =

River in North Dakota, United States

Coordinates: 48°28′28″N 97°09′22″W

The Park River is a river in North Dakota and a tributary of the Red River of the North. The name likely comes from brush corrals built by Native Americans on the banks of the river, which were called "buffalo parks" by early explorers. The corrals were used in a form of hunting in which buffalo would be driven into them and over the steep river banks in order to kill or injure them.

Elmwood (Grafton, North Dakota), a house listed on the National Register of Historic Places, is located along the river. Tributaries include the North Branch, South Branch, and Cart Creek.
