= Knife River =

River in North Dakota, United States of America

Coordinates: 47°19′17″N 101°22′08″W

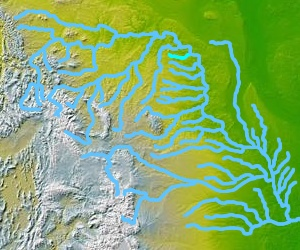
The Knife River, highlighted in a map of the watershed of the Missouri River

The Knife River is a tributary of the Missouri River, approximately 120 mi (193 km) long, in North Dakota in the United States.

Knife is an English translation of the Native American name.

It rises in west central North Dakota, in the Killdeer Mountains in Dunn County. It flows east, past Manning, and Marshall, and is joined by Spring Creek near Beulah. It passes through Beulah and just to the south of Hazen. It joins the Missouri north of Stanton, at the Knife River Indian Villages National Historic Site.

Much of the terrain surrounding the river valley still remains in native grasslands, supporting many species of wildlife, including Whitetail Deer, Mule Deer, Coyote, Fox, Native Grouse, Pheasant, etc. Many of the small tributaries such as the Little Knife support local farms and ranches; some have been family owned for over 100 years. Some of the larger ranches include the Circle Five Ranch, Dressler Ranch, Perhus Bros. Ranch, and Greenshield Ranch.

The river consistently floods after spring melting (frequently as high as 10,000 cfs) but is two to three magnitudes lower during the summer months. The confluence of the river (near Stanton, ND) was largely blocked by sand after the Missouri River flood of 2011 but had cut a new channel by the summer of 2012. At Hazen, the river's discharge averages 171 cubic feet per second.

== See also ==
- Knife River Bridge

== See also ==
- List of North Dakota rivers
- USGS streamgage at Hazen, ND

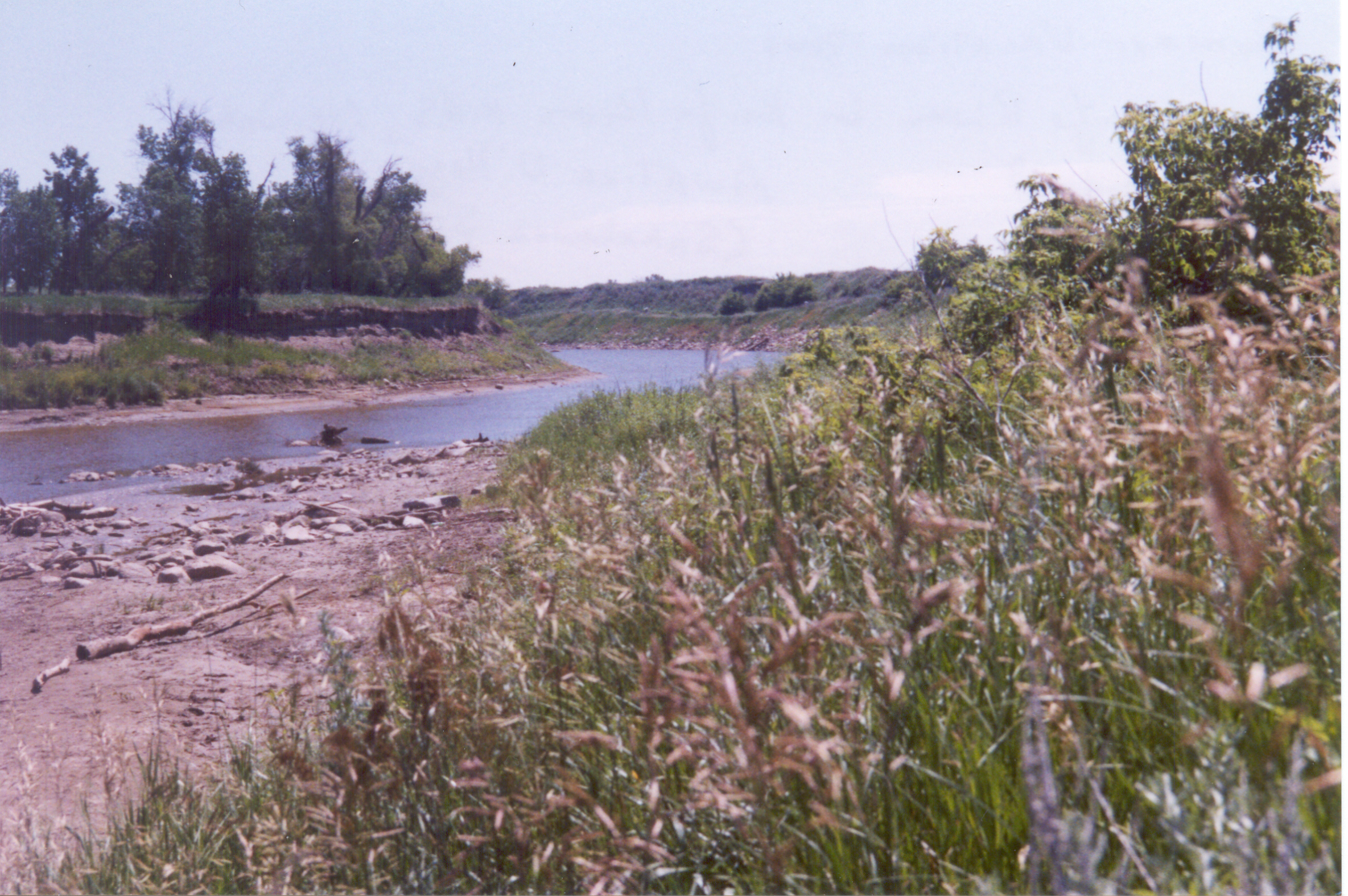
Knife River at Knife River Indian Villages National Historic Site
