= Mary Louise Defender Wilson =

Native American storyteller and educator

- Wagmuhawin
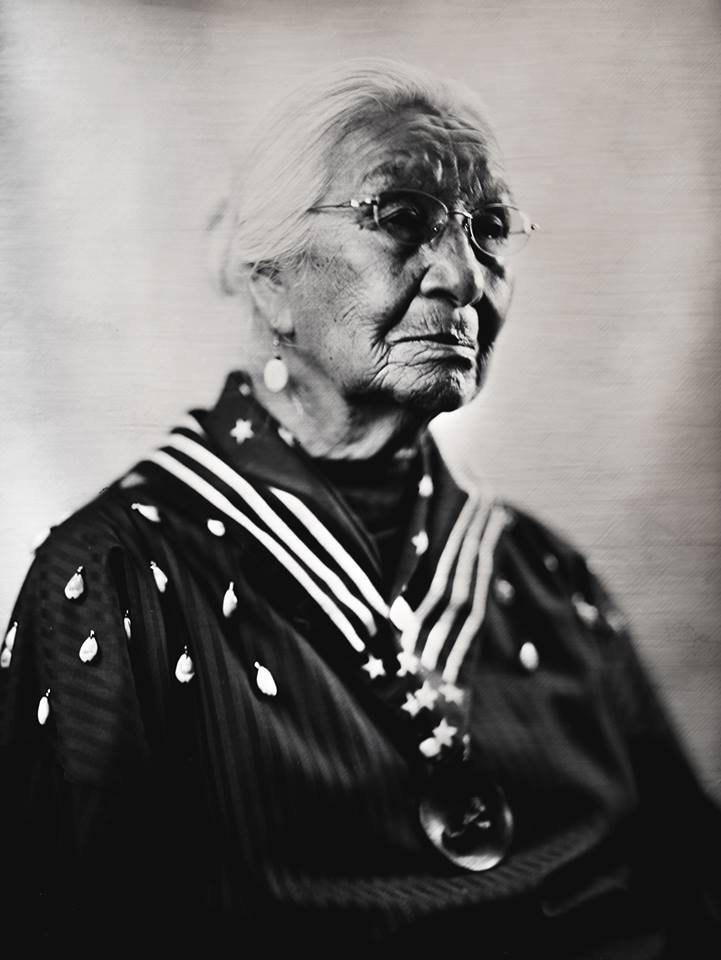
- Defender Wilson in 2016
- Born: Mary Louise Defender; October 14, 1930 (age 95); Shields, North Dakota, U.S.
- Other names: Gourd Woman
- Occupations: Storyteller, tribal elder, administrator
- Years active: 1980s–present
- Spouse: William Dean Wilson (married 1969–99)
- Awards: National Heritage Fellowship, United States Artists fellowship

Mary Louise Defender Wilson (born October 14, 1930), also known by her Dakotah name Wagmuhawin (Gourd Woman), is a storyteller, traditionalist, historian, scholar and educator of the Dakotah/Hidatsa people and a former director working in health care organizations. Her cultural work has been recognized with a National Heritage Fellowship in 1999 and a United States Artists fellowship in 2015, among many other honors.

== Early life ==
Defender was born on October 14, 1930, near Shields on the Standing Rock Indian Reservation in North Dakota. Her ancestors were forced by the military into the Standing Rock area in the 1890s. Her mother, Helen Margaret See The Bear, was a midwife and her grandfather, Tall Man See The Bear, herded sheep. Her father was George Defender, who died when his daughter was only two years old. She received most of her formal education going to a one-room reservation school.

From a young age, Defender Wilson was surrounded by the storytelling of her Dakotah-speaking family. Her mother, grandmother and great-grandmother were all midwives and storytellers. Her grandfather would share stories about places, plants and animals in the Wicheyena dialect of the Dakotah Sioux language. Wilson began telling stories at age 11, in both English and Dakotah, usually repeating the stories she heard from her elders.

In 1954, Wilson became the second Miss Indian America.

== Career ==
After she moved to New Mexico with her husband, Defender Wilson worked in a variety of administrative jobs with Native American-related government agencies, including family planning and health care, before returning to the reservation in 1976. Much of her early working life was spent helping tribal members with land issues, including efforts to compensate Native Americans who lost land or their homes during the building of Missouri River dams. In the 1980s, she taught tribal culture and language at Standing Rock Community College (now known as Sitting Bull College) in Fort Yates, North Dakota. She retired in 1996 from the directorship of the Native American Culture Center at the North Dakota State Hospital in Jamestown. After retiring, she worked as a consultant for Wisdom of the Elders, a symposium of Indian elders based out of Portland, Oregon.

It was not until the early 1980s that Defender Wilson began actively telling stories of her people and their culture for audiences. She has given talks and performed her stories in many venues, including teaching the Dakotah language to school children, at colleges and universities across the United States, at churches, at women's festivals, and at storytelling festivals such as the 2001 American Indian Storytelling Festival in Madison, Wisconsin and the 20th anniversary of the Minnesota Storytelling Festival in 2005. She once gave a presentation to NASA scientists at a workshop in Albuquerque, New Mexico about climate change on native lands.

Defender Wilson has told her stories throughout the United States as well as in Canada, Iceland, and Germany. Her stories reflect the four main tenets of Dakotah ethics, which are "compassion, being helpful, working hard, and communicating well". She was a Native American Humanities Scholar on an oral history project titled "The Respect and Honor Documentary Project".

North Dakota folklorist Troyd Geist has said of Wilson's storytelling:

The stories she tells speak to the human experience.... Those ancient narratives continue today because they are just as relevant now as they were in centuries past -- love and hatred, joy and sadness, unity and separation, peace and violence, truth and the desire to be better human beings.

Starting in 1984 and continuing for decades, she portrayed her great-grandmother in a program variously titled as "Good Day, Medicine Woman" or "Good Day, a Yanktoni Sioux Woman". Her ancestor lived from about 1850 to 1930, and the performance addressed the values and culture of the Yanktoni Sioux both before and after they were sent to reservations. In the late 1990s, she hosted two radio programs aired on KLND-FM in Little Eagle, South Dakota. The Saturday morning show titled Oape Wanzi featured tribal legend, culture and history presented in the Wichiyena dialect and then in English. She also hosted a Thursday morning call-in show titled Oyate Tawoabdeza ("The Public View") where she and her listeners would discuss local, regional, and national issues important to Native Americans.

In 1999, Defender Wilson released her first spoken word album, The Elders Speak. Her second album, My Relatives Say, was released in 2001. A review of the album in School Library Journal, which helps librarians with purchasing decisions, concluded with "This enhanced CD will add a great deal to any library seeking to increase its collection of quality Native American folk tales". As of December 2020, the album is held in 47 libraries worldwide. Her third album, Un De' Che Cha Pí ("The Way We Are"), was released in 2003. All three of her albums earned a Native American Music Award for Best Spoken Word recording.

She was a presenter at the 2004 opening of the National Museum of the American Indian on the mall in Washington, D.C. Defender Wilson performed along with fellow Native American storyteller Keith Bear at the Library of Congress on August 26, 2006, as part of the Homegrown Concert Series sponsored by the American Folklife Center.

In 2010, Defender Wilson was one of four Native American women invited to present the 16th annual Joseph Harper Cash Memorial Lecture at the University of South Dakota. In 2015, at age 85 she received a United States Artists fellowship of $50,000. She was the first person from North Dakota and the first storyteller to win the award.

As of late 2019, Defender Wilson continues to present her stories and talks in the upper Midwest. She was the featured guest at the Elder-in-Residence program at the University of Wisconsin-Madison in November 2019.

In recognition of her work dedicated to the preservation of oral history and in working for the human rights of Native Americans, Defender Wilson has served on several boards and commissions, including Arts Midwest, the North Dakota Council on the Arts, the North Dakota Humanities Council, and the North Dakota Centennial Commission. She was the only Native American on the 18-member Centennial Commission.

In October 2022, Defender Wilson's portrait was unveiled as one of three Native Americans included on the Glass City River Wall, near the Maumee River in Toledo, Ohio. Her image represents the elder or grandmother, who along with a mother and a child, were honored as representatives of the region's first farmers. The three images were painted on grain silos over 100 feet tall. Along with 25 other painted silos, measuring approximately 170,000 square feet and requiring almost 3,000 gallons of paint, the mural is the largest in the United States. The then-92 year old Defender Wilson attended the dedication ceremony.

Defender Wilson was one of several Native American storytellers featured in a 2023–2024 exhibit titled "On the Edge of the Wind: Native Storytellers & the Land" at the North Dakota Heritage Center & State Museum in Bismarck.

== Personal life ==
Defender met her future husband William Dean Wilson (previously known as William Diné Yazzie) in 1949 at Haskell Indian Nations University in Lawrence, Kansas, where Wilson was sent following his discharge from the military after World War II. They married in 1969. Her husband worked as a Navajo tribal judge in New Mexico. He was one of the original 29 World War II Navajo code talkers, having been recruited for the job by the military when he was only 15 years old, although he claimed to be 18 at the time. Her husband died in December 1999 and posthumously received a Congressional Gold Medal in 2001 honoring the original Navajo code talkers.

One of her two brothers, Dan Defender, was an underwater demolition technician (Navy frogman) during World War II, who later served in the Peace Corps. He was a member of Advocates for Human and Civil Rights, working for his community on the Standing Rock Sioux Reservation. He died in December 1995.

In 1988, Defender Wilson was one of 15 North Dakota delegates to the Democratic National Convention. She was pledged to candidate Jesse Jackson.

In the summer of 2002, Wilson's home in Shields was destroyed by a prairie fire, including all of her photographs of herself and her family and many antique family heirlooms that she used in her presentations.

After the fire, she moved a few miles away to Porcupine, North Dakota, a community of less than 150 people on the Standing Rock Indian Reservation, where she still resides as of 2018. She has served on the town's council.

== Published works ==
=== Books ===
- The Taken Land (1980s): stories collected by Defender Wilson and James V. Fenelon
- Die Welt Wird Niemals Enden: Geschichten der Dakota (2006): stories by Defender Wilson, translated into German by Michael Schlottner
- Sundogs and Sunflowers: Folklore and Folk Art of the Northern Great Plains (2010): stories collected by Defender Wilson, Paul T. Emch, and Deborah Gourneau

==== Article ====
- "Voyage of Domination, 'Purchase' as Conquest, Sakakawea for Savagery: Distorted Icons from Misrepresentations of the Lewis and Clark Expedition"

=== Discography ===
As featured artist:

- The Elders Speak (1999)
- My Relatives Say (2001)
- Un De' Che Cha Pí ("The Way We Are") (2003)

As one of various artists on compilation recordings:

- Keep My Fires Burning (2002): Defender Wilson performs "The World Never Ends"
- Spirit Woods (2004): Defender Wilson performs "The Star in the Cottonwood Tree"
- North Dakota Council on the Arts 40th Anniversary (2006): Defender Wilson performs "The Spiderman Meets the Giant" and "The Star in the Cottonwood Tree"
- Spirit Mountain (2007): Defender Wilson performs "The World Never Ends"

=== Filmography ===
- Confronting Violence (1992), a Wisconsin Public Television documentary program that featured Defender Wilson among five other interviewees examining how individuals respond to violence in their local communities.
- The Humanities Consultation (1998)
- Wisdom of the Elders: 1999 South Dakota Oral History Collection (tape 9)
- 19th Annual Evening of Storytelling (2016)

== Awards and honors ==
- North Dakota Centennial Commission Award (1989)
- The Bismarck Tribune Award (1990), for people who "work outside the spotlight to enrich the lives of others"
- Nominee for North Dakota's Theodore Roosevelt Rough Rider Award (1993)
- National Heritage Fellowship from the National Endowment for the Arts (1999), which is the United States government's highest honor in the folk and traditional arts
- Native American Music Award, Best Spoken Word recording for The Elders Speak (2000)
- Notable Document Award from the Government Documents Round Table of the American Library Association for The Elders Speak
- In March 2002, Defender Wilson was one of six women featured on a National Women's History Month poster. The theme for 2002 was "Women Sustaining the American Spirit".
- Native American Music Award, Best Spoken Word recording for My Relatives Say (2002)
- North Dakota Governor's Award for the Arts (2003)
- Bush Foundation grant (2004)
- Native American Music Award, Best Spoken Word recording for Un De' Che Cha Pí (2004)
- Honorary Doctor of Leadership degree from the University of Mary (2005)
- H. Councill Trenholm Memorial Award from the National Education Association for Human and Civil Rights (2009)
- Community Spirit Award from First Peoples Fund (2009)
- Enduring Vision Award from the Bush Foundation (2009)
- United States Artists Fellowship in Traditional Arts (2015)
- Women in American History Award from the Daughters of the American Revolution, Minishoshe-Mandan Chapter of Bismarck (2015)
- Native American Hall of Honor inductee (2017)
- Portrait included on the Glass City River Wall in Toledo, Ohio (2022)
