= Selfridge =

Selfridge or variation may refer to:

== People ==
- Andy Selfridge (1949–2019), American former National Football League player
- Harry Gordon Selfridge (1856–1947), American-born founder of Selfridges Department Store
- John Selfridge (1927–2010), American mathematician
- Oliver Selfridge (1926–2008), English computer scientist, a pioneer in artificial intelligence and grandson of Harry Gordon Selfridge
- Peter A. Selfridge (born 1971), United States Chief of Protocol (2014–2017)
- Rose Selfridge (1860–1918), American heiress and wife of Harry Selfridge
- Thomas Oliver Selfridge (1804–1902), United States Navy admiral
- Thomas Oliver Selfridge Jr. (1836–1924), United States Navy admiral and son of Thomas O. Selfridge
- Thomas Selfridge (1882–1908), US Army lieutenant and the first person to die in a powered airplane crash

== Places ==
- Selfridge, North Dakota, USA; a town
  - Selfridge High School
  - Selfridge Public School
- Selfridge Air National Guard Base, Michigan, USA; named for Thomas Selfridge
- Battery Selfridge, Fort Kamehameha, Pearl Harbor, Honolulu, Hawaii; an artillery battery
- Selfridges Building, Birmingham, England, UK; of the Selfridges department store chain; an award winning architectural design
- Selfridges, Oxford Street, London, England, UK; of the Selfridges department store chain; a listed building

== Ships ==
- USS Selfridge, a U.S. Navy ship name
  - USS Selfridge (DD-320), a United States Navy destroyer named for Thomas O. Selfridge
  - USS Selfridge (DD-357), a United States Navy destroyer named for Thomas O. Selfridge and Thomas O. Selfridge Jr.

== Other uses ==
- Selfridges (a.k.a. Selfridge's), a chain of four department stores in the United Kingdom
- Selfridge Prize, a prize awarded for the best paper at the Algorithmic Number Theory Symposium

== See also ==
- Miss Selfridge, a British high street store chain
- Mr Selfridge, a British period TV drama about Harry Gordon Selfridge of Selfridge's department stores
- Selfridges, Oxford Street bombing 1975
