= Delores Taken Alive =

Lakota language educator

Hiŋháŋ Sná Wíŋ (September 29, 1933 - August 29, 2020), also known as Delores Taken Alive, was a Lakota educator, radio host, and language specialist.

In 2023, Taken Alive was posthumously awarded the Kenneth L. Hale Award by the Society for the Study of the Indigenous Languages of the Americas (SSILA).

== Biography ==
Taken Alive was born on the Standing Rock Indian Reservation, the descendant of survivors of the Wounded Knee Massacre. She began working at a Head Start program in Little Eagle, South Dakota where she worked for thirty years before she began teaching the Lakota language at McLaughlin High School.

=== Lakota language revitalization work ===
As the number of first-language Lakota speaker dwindled, Taken Alive began working with Czech linguist Jan Ullrich in 2005. Ulrich and Wilhelm Meya formed the Lakota Language Consortium (LLC), originally focusing on Lakota, but later expanding to include other vulnerable and endangered Native American languages, including Ojibwe, Crow, and Gwichʼin. She recorded both words and stories for the Lakota Language Consortium's dictionary, as well as reviewing new entries, as part of a program between LLC and Lakota elders that paid speakers up to $50 per hour, in exchange for exclusive publication rights.

She also taught weekly classes at Sitting Bull College from 2017 to 2018; recordings of both her classes and the 48 episodes of her weekly radio show, It’s Good to Speak Lakota, have provided hundreds of hours of fluent Lakota speech. The recorded collection is the largest of its kind in the Lakota language resources corpus at Standing Rock Indian Reservation.

Delores Taken Alive died from COVID-19 in 2020 at age 86. She was one of at least three Lakota language revitalization instructors from Sitting Bull College, including Paulette High Elk and Richard Ramsey, to die of COVID-19 in 2020.

== Copyright lawsuit ==
Taken Alive's grandson, Eugene "Ray" Taken Alive, who is also a Lakota language instructor, has been involved in litigation against LLC since the death of his grandmother. After requesting recordings of Delores Taken Alive, he learned that the organization retained "unrestricted permission to copyright" and publish, according to the agreement signed by Taken Alive in 2005. LLC filed a lawsuit against Ray Taken Alive for copyright infringement. In May 2023, the Standing Rock Sioux Tribe voted to ban the consortium's representatives from the reservation.

The Standing Rock Sioux Tribe is readying a suit against Lakota Language Consortium to gain ownership of recordings.

== See also ==
- Language revitalization
