= The Standing Rock Rural Water System =

- RWS
- Location within North Dakota
- Coordinates: 45°43′21″N 100°29′12″W
- Primary inflows: Missouri River
- Managing agency: Standing Rock Municipal, Rural and Industrial Water Department (SRMRIWD)
- Built: 2009–

The Standing Rock Rural Water System (RWS) is a $30 million water system funded by the American Recovery and Reinvestment Act in 2009 for about 10,000 residents of the Standing Rock Sioux reservation in North Dakota. The RWS includes the Standing Rock Water Treatment and the "Indian Memorial Intake Pump Station, a raw water pipeline, two transmission pipelines and Kline Butte Storage Reservoir." The main regulation reservoir of the Standing Rock Rural Water System is the $3.6 million Kline Butte Storage Reservoir, located southwest of Kenel, South Dakota, which consists of a 5 million gallon ground storage reservoir. Currently, (in December 2016) the intake valve for the water system is "located in a shallow part of the Missouri River near Fort Yates, North Dakota, roughly 20 miles from the planned river crossing of the controversial Dakota Access Pipeline also known as the Bakken pipeline. The Bakken oil pipeline Dakota line is to be "buried 92 feet (28 m) below the riverbed in hard clay." A new valve came online in 2016 in Mobridge, South Dakota which is seventy miles south of the proposed Bakken Pipeline Missouri River crossing. This Mobridge intake valve is intended to service the entire Standing Rock Sioux reservation.

== Drought in the early 2000s ==
"The Standing Rock Tribe relies on an intake along the Oahe Reservoir to supply drinking water to their communities. The Oahe Reservoir now is down 32 feet...This reservoir is being managed under rules that were written 50 years ago...This is all overwhelmingly managed for the benefit of the barge industry downstream. Because when they started this process they thought the barge industry was going to be a much more dominant economic player. That proved to be wrong. Things changed. Transportation systems changed. The management of the reservoirs has not changed." The Corps of Engineers "regulate the six dams on the mainstem of the Missouri River" and they were "extraordinarily hard headed on the issues of dealing with the water in the entire Missouri River system. The upper reaches of that system have been systematically cheated in the manner in which that river has been managed."

— Senate Hearing November 18, 2004

In the early 2000s a multi-year drought "below normal snow pack, rainfall, and runoff" resulted in caused record low reservoir levels behind the three large upper dams. In 2003 Fort Peck was down by over "34 feet, Garrison over 24 feet, and Oahe over 32 feet." This reached a crisis when on November 24, 2003, 10,000 people on the Standing Rock Sioux reservation were without water when the Fort Yates intake failed because of a low water level in the Missouri River and therefore in Lake Oahe. Hospitals and schools were forced to close. An oversight hearing on November 18, 2004 of the United States Senate Committee on Indian Affairs received testimony on problems experienced by the Standing Rock Sioux tribes situated along the Missouri River. During the severe drought from 2002 to 2005, the Game, Fish and Parks Department spent over $5 million to keep 14 of the 32 boat ramps on Lake Oahe open. Sioux elders remember how high Lake Oahe was in 1948. They could never have imagined living through a water shortage. There were concerns that water was being held upstream to ensure passage of the river barges in the State of Missouri (particularly in the Kansas City area), while people downstream were without water for human consumption. In 2004, Charles W. Murphy, chairman of the Standing Rock Sioux Tribe estimated that an inland reservoir at Fort Yates would cost $30 million. It would involve putting in an inlet further south so that the main channel would provide the water where it narrows. Successive drought years led to a cumulative negative impact on the Missouri River reservoir. Giant reservoirs were at a record low of 21 million acre below average. In 2004 the total volume dropped 3 million acre-feet less than 2003.

There is an intake at Wakpala in Lake Oahe near the mouth of the Grand River. At the upper end of Lake Oahe there are two intakes on the Missouri River, Cannon Ball, which is located in the northeastern part of Sioux County, at the confluence of the Cannonball River and Lake Oahe of the Missouri River, and Fort Yates, Sioux County, North Dakota where raw water is transmitted to the Fort Yates treatment plant. This is an integral part of the RWS, providing drinking water for 3,400 residents. The Fort Yates plant is the primary source of drinking water for the Prairie Knights Casino and Lodge and the communities of Porcupine, Cannonball and Fort Yates.
