= Mother Mary Catherine Sacred White Buffalo =

Hunkpapa Lakota Catholic nun (1867–1893)

- Ptesanwanyakapi
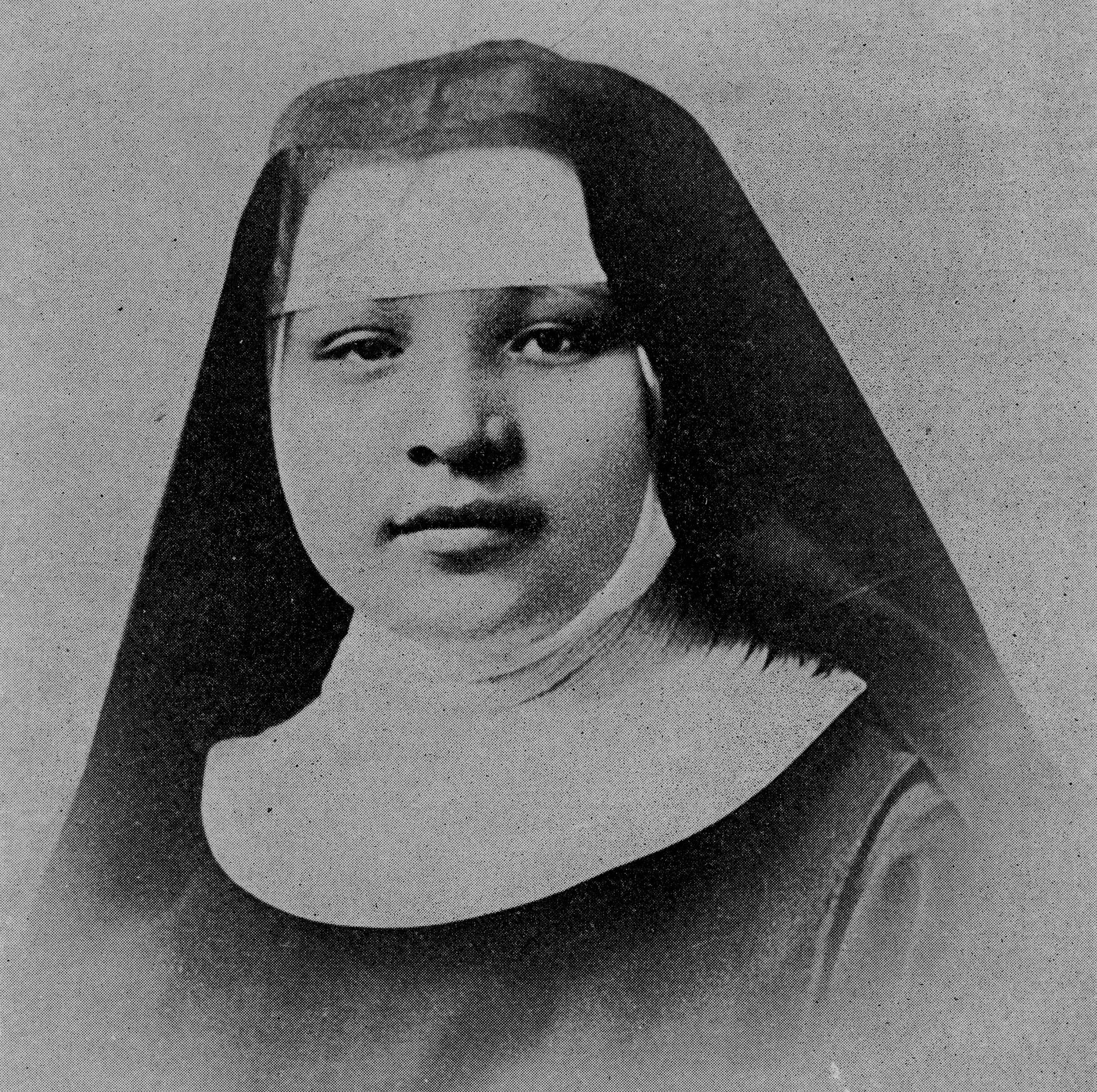
- Photograph of Mother Mary Catherine
- Born: Josephine Crowfeather; 1867 near Standing Rock Sioux Reservation, Dakota Territory
- Died: 1893 (aged 25–26)

Mother Mary Catherine, Sacred White Buffalo (Lakota: Ptesanwanyakapi; 1867–1893) was a Roman Catholic nun and member of the Hunkpapa Lakota group. She founded the Congregation of American Sisters.

== Early life ==
Mother Mary Catherine was born Josephine Crowfeather in 1867 near the Standing Rock Indian Reservation in the Dakota Territory. Her father, Hunkpapa Lakota chief Joseph Crowfeather, reportedly carried Josephine into battle for safety when she was an infant; both father and daughter returned from the battle unharmed. Because of this, Crowfeather was given the name Ptesanwanyakapi (They See a White Buffalo Woman).

== Education ==
Crowfeather reportedly expressed a desire to become a Catholic nun at a young age, and spent four years at the Benedictine Sisters' School in Fort Yates, North Dakota. From 1888 to 1890, Crowfeather studied theology under Father Francis M. Craft. Both Crowfeather and Craft were reportedly influenced by the life and work of the Algonquin-Mohawk saint Kateri Tekakwitha.

Crowfeather later attended a Benedictine school in Avoca, Minnesota, along with five other Lakota women.

== Life as a nun ==
She entered a Benedictine novitiate in Zell, Minnesota, professing vows in 1890. She served at a mission school in Stephan, South Dakota until the organization was moved to the Fort Berthold Reservation in Elbowoods, North Dakota.

The year after the move to North Dakota, Mary Catherine was elected founding prioress-general of the Congregation of American Sisters, and assumed the title Mother. The Congregation performed missionary work with the Arikara, Gros Ventre, and Mandan communities.

She died from tuberculosis in 1893. The Congregation of American sisters survived until 1900, with a peak membership of twelve.
