= Cedar Creek (North Dakota) =

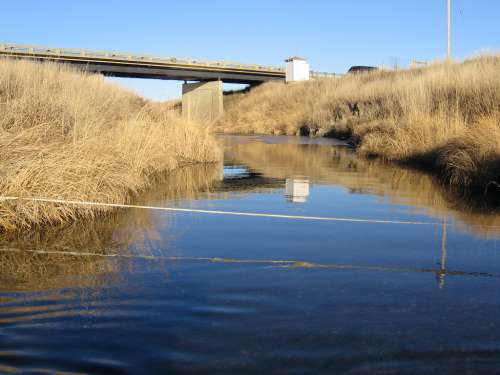
- USGS Gage House reflected in Cedar Creek, North Dakota

Physical characteristics
- Source
  - location: Slope County, North Dakota
  - coordinates: 46°18′14″N 103°20′49″W
  - elevation: 2,963 ft (903 m)
- Mouth
  - location: Confluence with the Cannonball River, Grant County, North Dakota
  - coordinates: 46°07′29″N 101°18′40″W
  - elevation: 1,860 ft (570 m)

Basin features
- Progression: Cedar Creek → Cannonball → Missouri → Mississippi → Gulf of Mexico
- GNIS ID: 1034769

Cedar Creek (also called the Cedar River) is a tributary of the Cannonball River in southwestern North Dakota in the United States.

It rises near White Butte, south of Amidon in the badlands of Slope County. It flows ESE, north of Whetstone Butte, then east, north of the Cedar River National Grassland, forming the northern border of Sioux County and the Standing Rock Sioux Reservation. It joins the Cannonball approximately 15 miles (24 km) southwest of Shields.

== See also ==
- Cedar Creek Bridge (Haynes, North Dakota)
- List of North Dakota rivers
