= Selfridge High School =

Selfridge Public High School

Location
- 210 2nd Ave S Selfridge, North Dakota 58568; USA
- Coordinates: 46°02′20″N 100°55′18″W

Information
- Type: Public
- Established: 1910
- School district: Selfridge Public School District
- Principal: Kristi Miller
- Superintendent: James Gross
- Staff: 6.44 (FTE)
- Grades: 7–12
- Enrollment: 28 (2023–2024)
- Student to teacher ratio: 4.35
- Colors: Black, white, orange
- Mascot: Chieftain

Selfridge High School is a public high school located in Selfridge, North Dakota on the Standing Rock Sioux Reservation. It currently serves over 50 students and is a part of the Selfridge Public School District system. The official school colors are white, black, orange and the athletic teams are known as "The Chieftains".

The mission of Selfridge High School is to enhance student achievement and promote quality learning that is functional, stimulating, collaborative, individualized and appreciative.
