= SRCS =

SRCS may refer to:

- Krantivira Sangolli Rayanna Railway Station metro station, Bengaluru, Karnataka, India (by station code)
- San Rafael City Schools
- Santa Rosa Consolidated Schools
- Standing Rock Community School, in association with Fort Yates School District
