= Cedar Creek Bridge (Haynes, North Dakota) =

- U.S. National Register of Historic Places
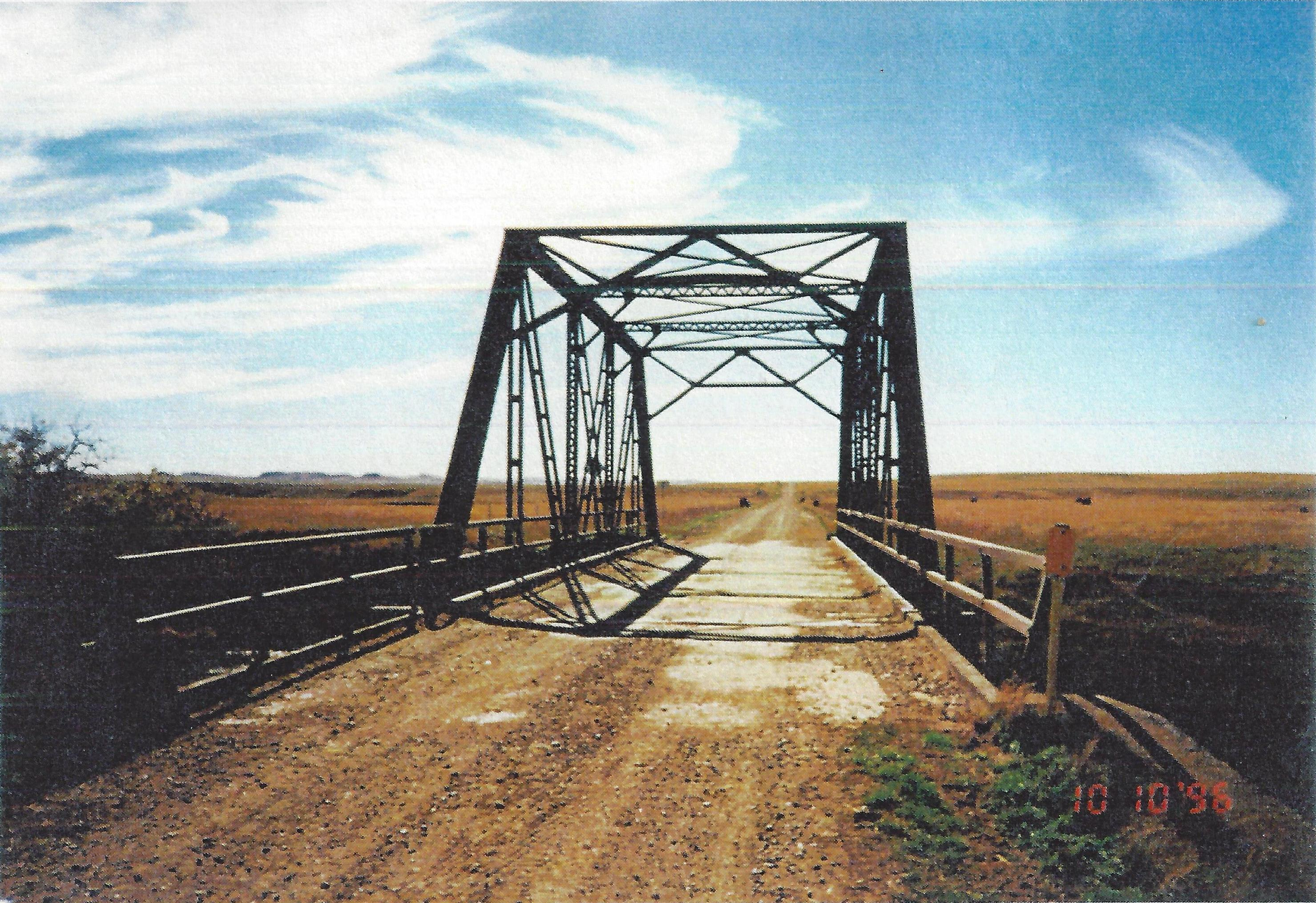

- Location within North Dakota Location within the United States
- Nearest city: Haynes, North Dakota
- Coordinates: 46°3′2″N 102°13′37″W
- Area: less than one acre
- Built: 1908
- Built by: Twin City Building Company
- Architectural style: Pratt through truss
- MPS: Historic Roadway Bridges of North Dakota MPS
- NRHP reference No.: 97000168
- Added to NRHP: February 27, 1997

The Cedar Creek Bridge near Haynes, North Dakota, United States, is a Pratt through truss structure that was built in 1908. It was listed on the National Register of Historic Places (NRHP) in 1997.

It is a rigid-connected (riveted) Pratt through truss. It was one of many North Dakota bridges listed on the National Register as part of a Multiple Property Submission. The bridge is located 6 miles (9.7 km) north and 11 miles (18 km) east of Haynes. It brings a county section road across Cedar Creek, a tributary to the Cannonball River.

According to its NRHP nomination, "The bridge is significant ... for its association with an important pattern of bridge construction in a number of counties in the state, in which one or two bridge companies received most of the contracts over a successive period of years, even with, or under the pretense of, competitive bidding. This pattern emerged in the late nineteenth century and, in some counties, continued into the 1930s. This bridge serves as a representative example of the pattern; it is one of the two oldest documented bridges in Adams County constructed by a long-term county bridge builder, the Twin City Bridge Company."
