= Sioux County Courthouse =

Sioux County Courthouse may refer to:

- Sioux County Courthouse (Iowa), Orange City, Iowa
- Sioux County Courthouse (Nebraska), Harrison, Nebraska
- Former Sioux County Courthouse (North Dakota), Fort Yates, North Dakota
