= Laurel Vermillion =

American academic administrator

- Oyate Wanyanka Pi Win
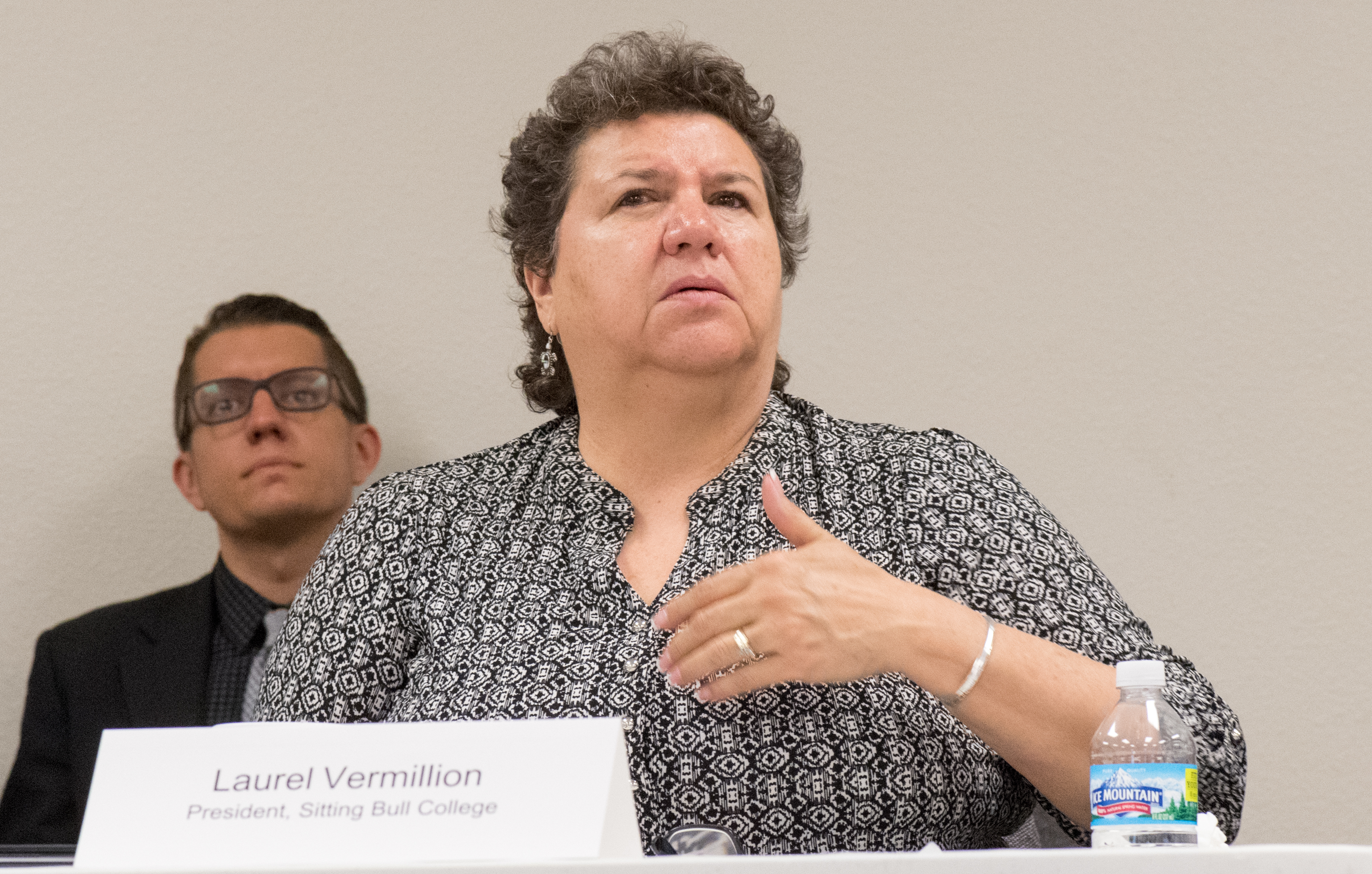

President of Sitting Bull College
- In office 2006 – 1 January 2024
- Preceded by: Ron His Horse Is Thunder
- Succeeded by: Tomi Kay Phillips

Personal details
- Born: Standing Rock Indian Reservation, North Dakota, U.S.
- Children: 3
- Education: Standing Rock Community College; University of North Dakota

Laurel A. Vermillion (Lakota: Oyate Wanyanka Pi Win, lit. 'Seen-By-Her-Nation') is an American (Hunkpapa) educator and academic administrator who served as the president of Sitting Bull College from 2006 to 2024. She previously served as its vice president of operations and vice president of academic affairs. She was a principal of Marty Indian School and an elementary teacher in the Fort Yates School District for fourteen years.

== Early life ==
Vermillion was born and raised in the small town of Kennel, North Dakota, on the Standing Rock Indian Reservation. A Hunkpapa, her Lakota language name, is Oyate Wanyanka Pi Win transl. Seen-By-Her-Nation. Her parents, Henry and Elsie Martin, were ranchers. She was raised 1.5 miles away from the Missouri River and used to collect water and nearby wild grapes with her grandparents using a horse-drawn wagon. She attended Doctor School, a one-room schoolhouse with one teacher, Hope Chamberlain. The school was a two-mile walk from her home. She graduated from high school in 1973.

== Career ==
Upon high school graduation, Vermillion began working for the Standing Rock Housing Corporation where she transcribed a dictaphone. She later became a teacher's aide at a local Head Start program. That same year, Jack Barden, one of the founders of Standing Rock Community College, encouraged Vermillion to attend the college. She became one of its first students and Barden continued to serve as her mentor through her higher education. When she began college, it still did not have any buildings, so Vermillion and her classmates attended classes in a community center. She was a mother and worked while attending college. She completed a B.S. in elementary education through the articulation agreement between Standing Rock and the University of North Dakota (UND) in 1980.

Vermillion worked as an elementary teacher in the Fort Yates School District for fourteen years. In 1992, she completed a M.S. in education administration from UND through Project IDEAL (Indians Developing as Education Administration Leaders). She moved to Marty, South Dakota and worked as the principal of the Marty Indian School (MIS). The move was personal because her parents had attended MIS. In 1995, Vermillion returned to Sitting Bull College as its vice president of academic affairs. Starting in 1999, she served as the vice president of operations for seven years while completing a Ph.D. in teaching and learning in higher education from UND in 2005. Her dissertation was titled Factors Contributing to Student Retention and Attrition at Sitting Bull College Between 2001-2004. Richard G. Landry was her doctoral advisor.

In 2005, following Ron His Horse Is Thunder's election to tribal chairman, Vermillion succeeded him as the interim president of Sitting Bull College. She officially became president in spring 2006. She supports the Standing Rock Education Consortium which encourages science, technology, engineering, and mathematics (STEM) education in local K–12 and Head Start programs. Starting on August 1, 2023, Vermillion is mentoring incoming president, Tomi Kay Phillips. She retires on January 1, 2024.

== Personal life ==
Vermillion married in October 1973 and had three children.
