= Selfridge, North Dakota =

- City
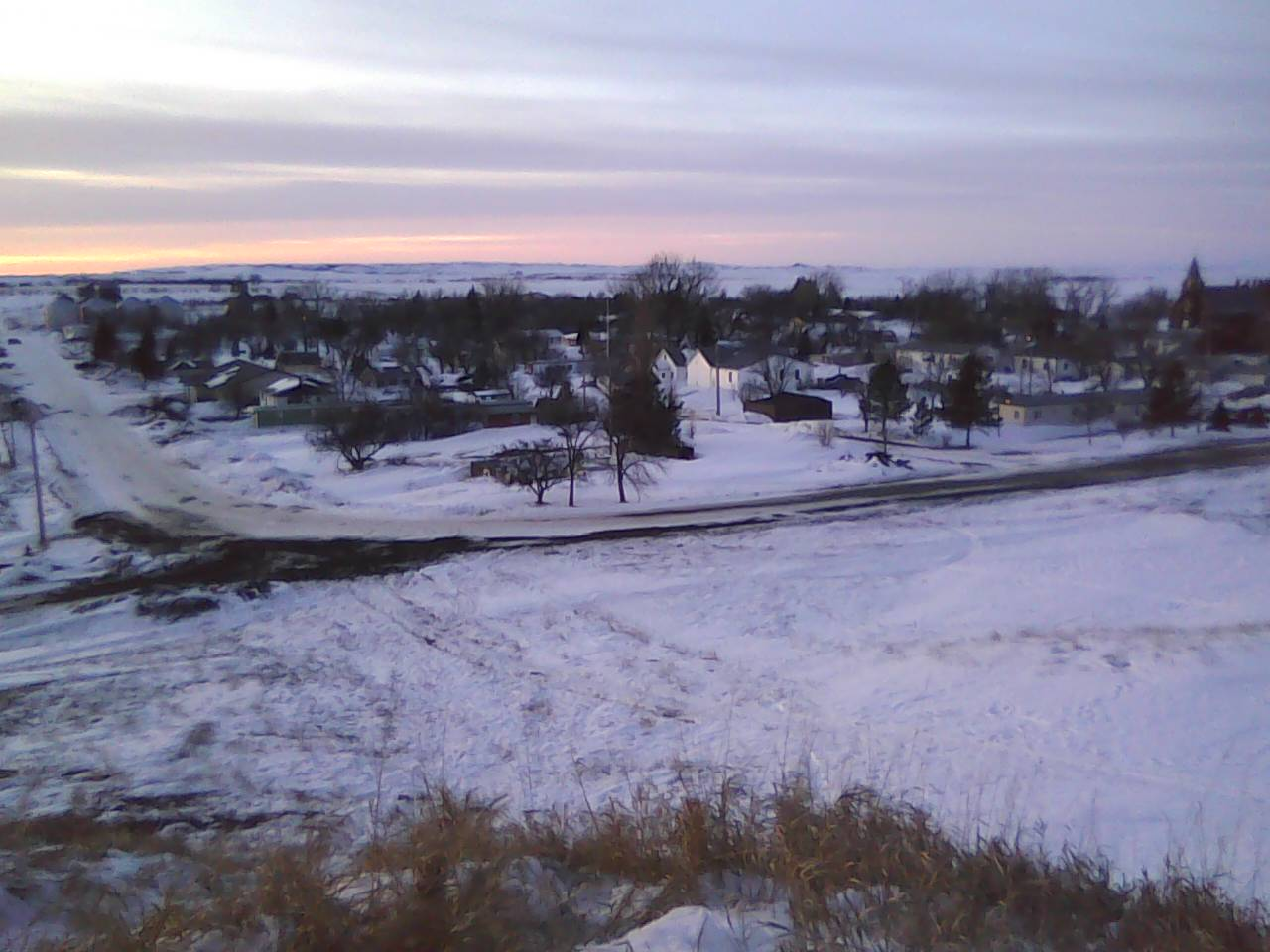

- Location of Selfridge, North Dakota
- Coordinates: 46°02′30″N 100°55′28″W
- Country: United States
- State: North Dakota
- County: Sioux
- Founded: 1911

Government
  - Type: Incorporated City
  - Mayor: Giles Heinen

Area
  - Total: 0.29 sq mi (0.76 km^{2})
  - Land: 0.29 sq mi (0.76 km^{2})
  - Water: 0 sq mi (0.00 km^{2})
- Elevation: 2,192 ft (668 m)

Population (2020)
  - Total: 127
  - Estimate (2022): 121
  - Density: 431.0/sq mi (166.42/km^{2})
  - Demonym: Selfridgite
- Time zone: UTC-6 (Central (CST))
  - Summer (DST): UTC-5 (CDT)
- Zip Code: 58568
- Area code: 701
- FIPS code: 38-71660
- GNIS feature ID: 1036257
- Highways: ND 6, ND 31

Selfridge is a city in Sioux County, North Dakota, United States and on the Standing Rock Sioux Reservation. Selfridge was founded in 1911. The population was 127 at the 2020 census. Other settlements near this town include Fort Yates and Porcupine. Previous settlements that have since dissolved are Maple Leaf and Chadwick.

== Geography ==
According to the United States Census Bureau, the town has a total area of 0.27 square miles (0.70 km^{2}), all land.

== School System ==
The Selfridge Public School District system consists of two main school buildings. Selfridge Elementary serves grades K-6. The high school serves grades 7-12. The school system enrolls around 100 students.

The schools were built in the 1950s to replace the old main school building. The elementary school was once a private school for the St. Philomena Catholic Church.

== Organizations ==
The town is now served by the USDA (United States Department of Agriculture), Cedar Soil Conservation District, the senior center, the United States Postal Service, and numerous churches.

== History ==
Selfridge was settled in 1911 along a Milwaukee Road branch line that diverged from the railroad's Pacific Extension transcontinental route in McLaughlin, South Dakota, and ran to New England, North Dakota. In 1917, the railroad moved a stationary boxcar into Selfridge on a flatcar to serve as the first depot, with G.E. Langbein serving as the first depot agent. The boxcar required significant repairs upon arrival. During its early years, Selfridge relied heavily on the railroad for both passenger travel and freight. Incoming freight included groceries, lumber, coal, machinery, and ice, while outgoing shipments consisted of mail, livestock, grain, and dairy products. Passenger rail service remained a primary mode of long-distance travel for residents until the late 1940s.

The town's first business, a general store, opened in 1911, followed later that year by the Sioux Lumber Company, which provided building supplies for subsequent commercial and residential construction. Early residential structures often consisted of temporary shanties before permanent houses were built.

Early agricultural development in the Selfridge area centered on flax cultivation and open range cattle ranching. Prior to the 1930s, transportation was limited by a lack of developed roads. Significant road construction began in the 1930s through the Works Progress Administration (WPA), utilizing horse-drawn equipment and early machinery.

For its first eight years, Selfridge operated as an unincorporated community without municipal ordinances. Prior to its incorporation, residents unsuccessfully lobbied to have Selfridge designated as the county seat when Sioux County was formed from Morton County. In the 1950s, a second unsuccessful attempt was made to relocate the county seat from Fort Yates to Selfridge, citing Selfridge's more central location within the county.

By 1925, Selfridge had grown to include 51 homes and 63 businesses, including four schools, two churches, three grain elevators, two banks, a hotel, a newspaper, and various retail and service establishments.

By 1930, the town's population had more than doubled.

During the Great Depression, the local economy was supported by federal relief programs. The WPA employed local residents to build the city auditorium, install sidewalks, and establish a city park. The National Youth Administration (NYA) also provided employment for young people in the community.

While informal firefighting efforts existed previously, the Selfridge volunteer fire department was formally organized in 1973, funded through community fundraisers. Historically, the town has lost several businesses and homes to major fires.

Over the 20th century, local agriculture modernized with the introduction of chemical herbicides and pesticides, improved seed varieties, and mechanized farming equipment. The Cedar Soil Conservation Office assisted local farmers with surveying and financing the construction of dams, dugouts, and dikes. These technological advancements reduced the need for manual farm labor while increasing the emphasis on farm management and production efficiency.

Selfridge reached its peak population in the late 1950s and early 1960s, a period marked by increased local construction. By the 1970s, the population began to decline, mirroring a nationwide trend of rural-to-urban migration and increased regional commercial competition. The demographic shift led to a decrease in student enrolment and generated concerns about the potential closure of the local school.

On September 16, 2024, a fire destroyed the town's post office, which was housed in a building that had previously served as a bank and a grocery store.

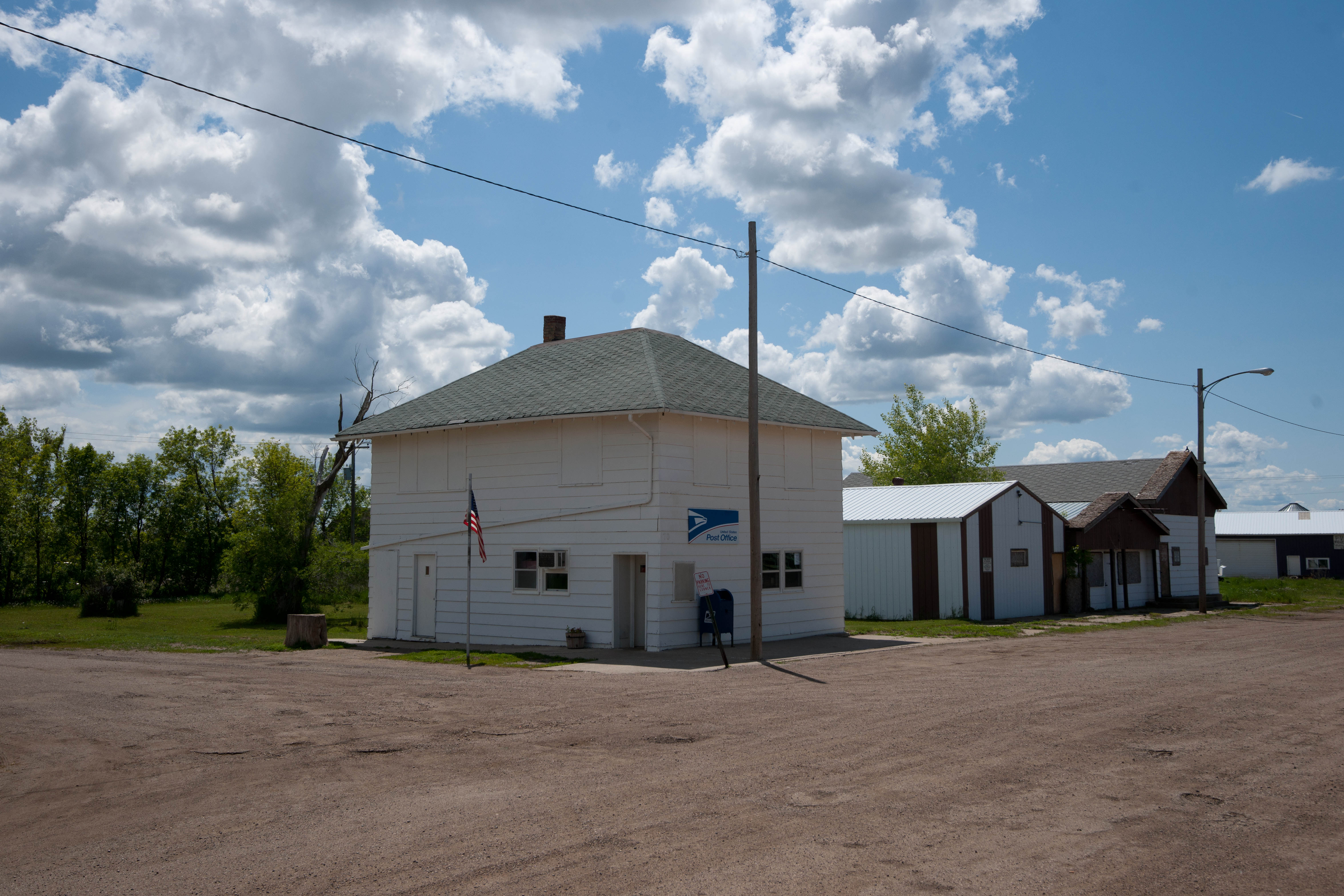
U.S. Post office in Selfridge

== Transportation ==
The main access to the town is using North Dakota Highway 6. The Milwaukee Road line that ran through the town was abandoned in 1983, leaving Selfridge without railway access.

== Demographics ==
Historical population
Census	Pop.	Note	%±
1910	25		—
1920	153		512.0%
1930	351		129.4%
1940	329		−6.3%
1950	343		4.3%
1960	371		8.2%
1970	346		−6.7%
1980	273		−21.1%
1990	242		−11.4%
2000	223		−7.9%
2010	160		−28.3%
2020	127		−20.6%
2022 (est.)	121		−4.7%
U.S. Decennial Census; 2020 Census

=== 2010 census ===
As of the census of 2010, there were 160 people, 59 households, and 36 families residing in the town. The population density was 592.6 inhabitants per square mile (228.8/km^{2}). There were 76 housing units at an average density of 281.5 per square mile (108.7/km^{2}). The racial makeup of the town was 33.1% White, 0.6% African American, 58.1% Native American, 1.3% Asian, and 6.9% from two or more races. Hispanic or Latino of any race were 2.5% of the population.

There were 59 households, of which 32.2% had children under the age of 18 living with them, 25.4% were married couples living together, 23.7% had a female householder with no husband present, 11.9% had a male householder with no wife present, and 39.0% were non-families. 30.5% of all households were made up of individuals, and 6.8% had someone living alone who was 65 years of age or older. The average household size was 2.71 and the average family size was 3.28.

The median age in the town was 34.5 years. 31.2% of residents were under the age of 18; 9.5% were between the ages of 18 and 24; 21.3% were from 25 to 44; 22.5% were from 45 to 64; and 15.6% were 65 years of age or older. The gender makeup of the town was 49.4% male and 50.6% female.

=== 2000 census ===
As of the census of 2000, there were 223 people, 71 households, and 54 families residing in the town. The population density was 830.4 inhabitants per square mile (320.6/km^{2}). There were 85 housing units at an average density of 316.5 per square mile (122.2/km^{2}). The racial makeup of the town was 39.91% White, 59.19% Native American, 0.45% Pacific Islander, and 0.45% from two or more races. Hispanic or Latino of any race were 2.24% of the population.

There were 71 households, out of which 46.5% had children under the age of 18 living with them, 36.6% were married couples living together, 28.2% had a female householder with no husband present, and 23.9% were non-families. 19.7% of all households were made up of individuals, and 2.8% had someone living alone who was 65 years of age or older. The average household size was 3.14 and the average family size was 3.48.

In the town the population was spread out, with 40.8% under the age of 18, 9.4% from 18 to 24, 23.8% from 25 to 44, 20.2% from 45 to 64, and 5.8% who were 65 years of age or older. The median age was 24 years. For every 100 females, there were 89.0 males. For every 100 females age 18 and over, there were 83.3 males.

The median income for a household in the town was $24,375, and the median income for a family was $23,594. Males had a median income of $21,875 versus $18,750 for females. The per capita income for the town was $8,824. About 21.6% of families and 29.4% of the population were below the poverty line, including 38.6% of those under the age of eighteen and 31.6% of those 65 or over.

== Climate ==
This climatic region is typified by large seasonal temperature differences, with warm to hot (and often humid) summers and cold (sometimes severely cold) winters. According to the Köppen Climate Classification system, Selfridge has a humid continental climate, abbreviated "Dfb" on climate maps.
