= Hunkpapa =

Traditional tribal grouping within the Lakota people

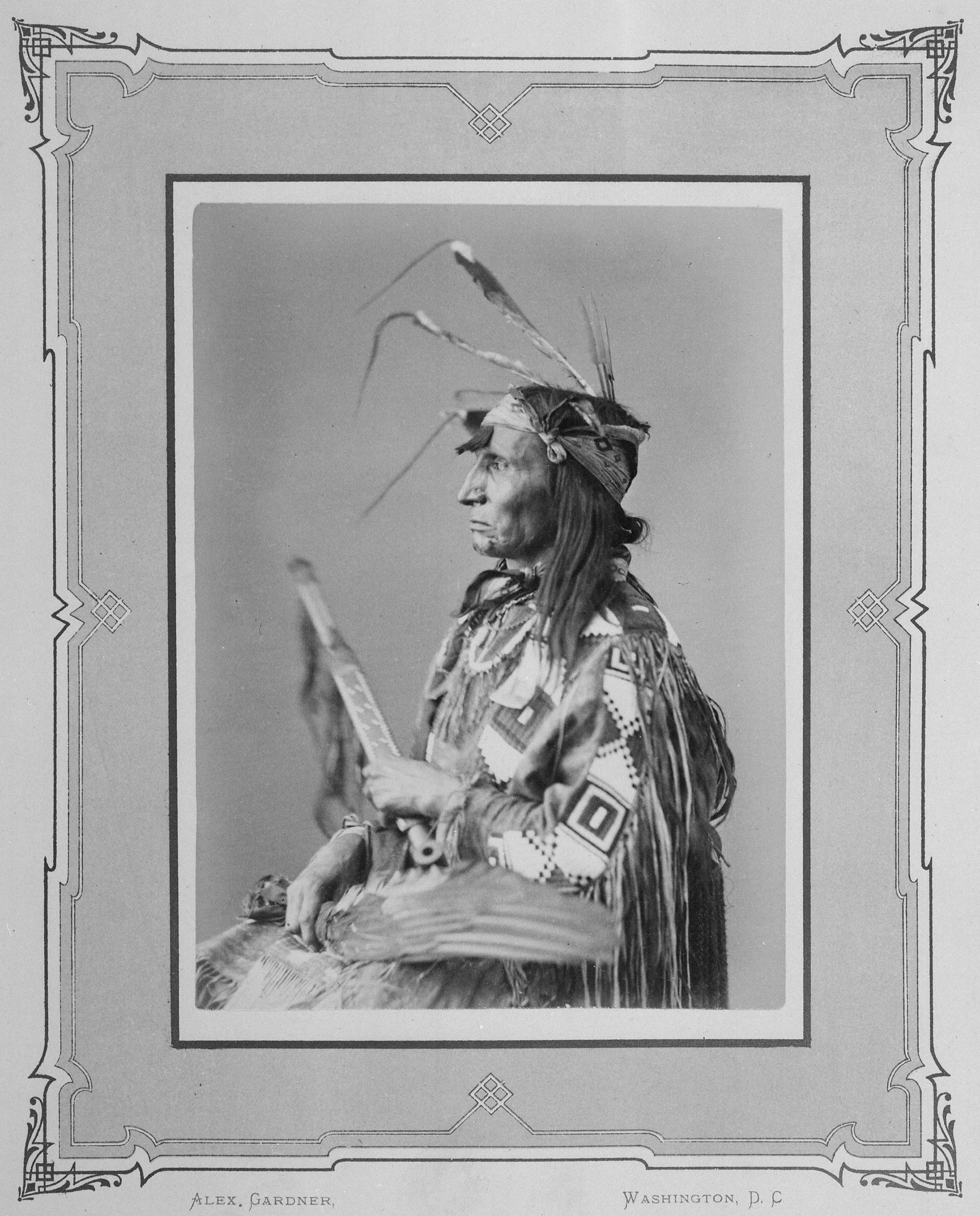
Walking Shooter (Wah-Koo-Ta-Mon-Ih), 1872 Tribal Delegations to the Federal Government

The Hunkpapa (Lakota: Húŋkpapȟa) are a Native American group, one of the seven council fires of the Lakota tribe. The name Húŋkpapȟa is a Lakota word, meaning 'Head of the Circle' (at one time, the tribe's name was represented in European-American records as Honkpapa). By tradition, the Húŋkpapȟa set up their lodges at the entryway to the circle of the Great Council when the Sioux met in convocation. They speak Lakȟóta, one of the three dialects of the Sioux language.

== History in the 19th century ==
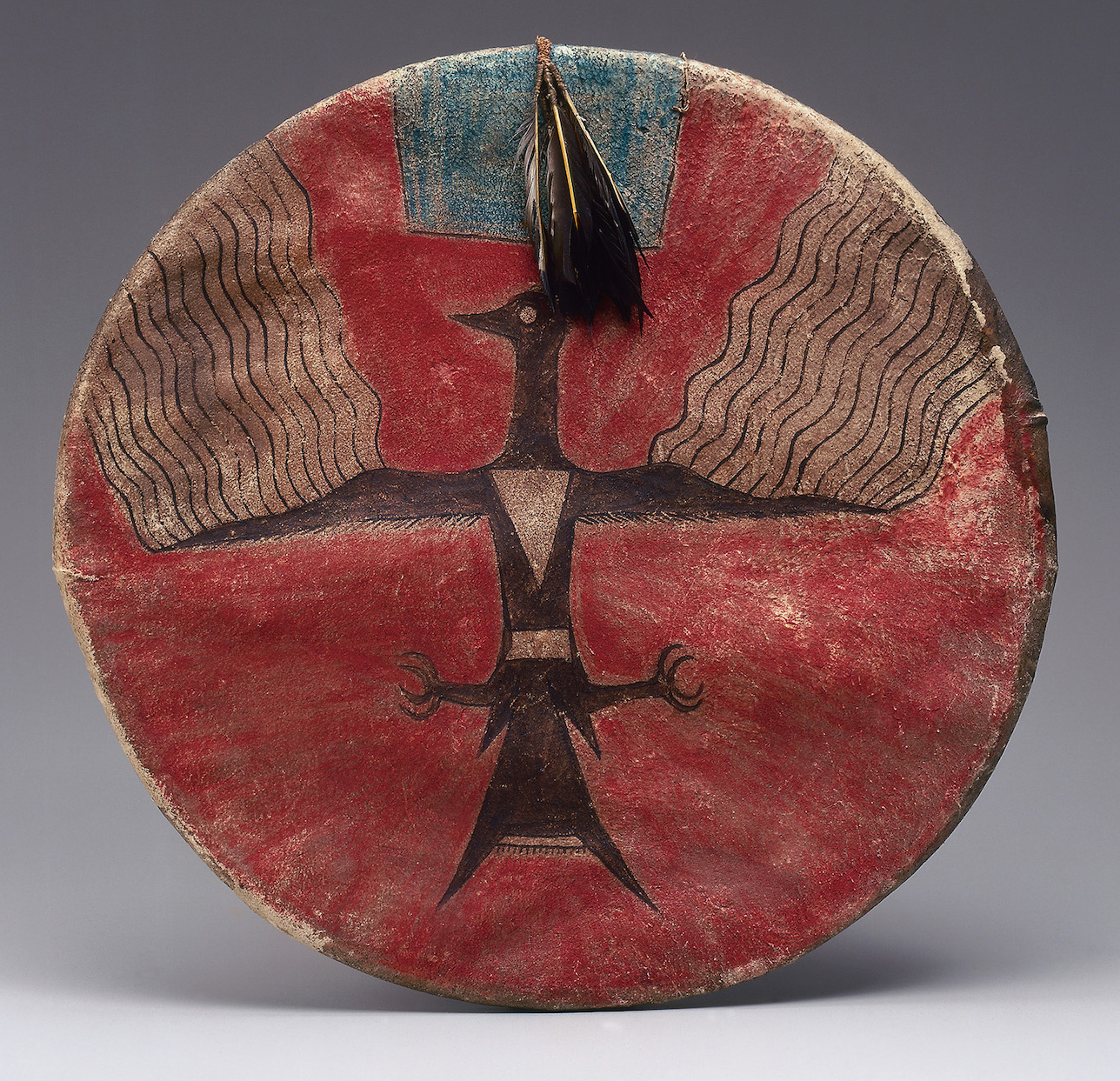
Hunkpapa Lakota shield, 1885, made by Joseph No Two Horns (He Nupa Wanica), Metropolitan Museum of Art

Seven hundred and fifty mounted Yankton, Yanktonai and Lakota joined six companies of the Sixth Infantry and 80 fur trappers in an attack on an Arikara Indian village at Grand River (now South Dakota) in August 1823, named the Arikara War. Members of the Lakota, a part of them "Ankpapat", were the first Native Americans to fight in the American Indian Wars alongside US forces west of the Missouri. The Hunkpapa are said to have "won the west" half a century before the whites.

They may have formed as a tribe within the Lakota relatively recently, as the first mention of the Hunkpapa in European-American historical records was from a treaty of 1825.

By signing the 1825 treaty, the Hunkpapa and the United States committed themselves to keep up the "friendship which has heretofore existed". With their x-mark, the chiefs also recognized the supremacy of the United States. It is not certain whether they really understood the text in the document. The US representatives gave a medal to Little White Bear, who they understood was the principal Hunkpapa chief; they did not realize how decentralized Native American authority was.

With the Indian Vaccination Act of 1832, the United States assumed responsibility for the inoculation of the Indians against smallpox. Some visiting Hunkpapa may have benefitted from Dr. M. Martin's inoculation of about 900 southern Lakota (no divisions named) at the head of Medicine Creek that autumn. When smallpox struck in 1837, it hit the Hunkpapa as the northernmost Lakota division. The loss, however, may have been fewer than one hundred people. Overall, the Hunkpapa seem to have suffered less from new diseases than many other tribes did.

The boundaries for the Lakota Indian territory were defined in the general peace treaty negotiated near Fort Laramie in the summer of 1851. Leaders of eight different tribes, often at odds with each other and each claiming large territories, signed the treaty. The United States was a ninth party to it. The Crow Indian territory included a tract of land north of the Yellowstone, while the Little Bighorn River ran through the heartland of the Crow country (now Montana). The treaty defines the land of the Arikara, the Hidatsa and the Mandan as a mutual area north of Heart River, partly encircled by the Missouri (now North Dakota).

Soon enough the Hunkpapa and other Sioux attacked the Arikara and the two other so-called village tribes, just as they had done in the past. By 1854, these three smallpox-devastated tribes called for protection from the U.S. Army, and they would repeatedly do so almost to the end of inter-tribal warfare. Eventually the Hunkpapa and other Lakota took control of the three tribes' area north of Heart River, forcing the village people to live in Like a Fishhook Village outside their treaty land. The Lakota were largely in control of the occupied area to 1876–1877.

The United States Army General Warren estimated the population of the Hunkpapa Lakota at about 2920 in 1855. He described their territory as ranging "from the Big Cheyenne up to the Yellowstone, and west to the Black Hills. He states that they formerly intermarried extensively with the Cheyenne." He noted that they raided settlers along the Platte River. In addition to dealing with warfare, they suffered considerable losses due to contact with Europeans and contracting of Eurasian infectious diseases to which they had no immunity.

The Hunkpapa gave some of their remote relatives among the Santee Sioux armed support during a large-scale battle near Killdeer Mountain in 1864 with U.S. troops led by General A. Sully.

The Great Sioux Reservation was established with a new treaty in 1868. The Lakota agreed to the construction of "any railroad" outside their reservation. The United States recognized that "the country north of the North Platte River and east of the summits of the Big Horn Mountains" was unsold or unceded Indian territory. These hunting grounds in the south and in the west of the new Lakota domain were used mainly by the Sicangu (Brule-Sioux) and the Oglala, living nearby.

The "free bands" of Hunkpapa favored campsites outside the unsold areas. They took a leading part in the westward enlargement of the range used by the Lakota in the late 1860s and the early 1870s at the expense of other tribes. In search for buffalo, Lakota regularly occupied the eastern part of the Crow Indian Reservation as far west as the Bighorn River, sometimes even raiding the Crow Agency, as they did in 1873. The Lakota pressed the Crow Indians to the point that they reacted like other small tribes: they called for the U.S. Army to intervene and take actions against the intruders.

In the late summer of 1873, the Hunkpapa boldly attacked the Seventh Cavalry in United States territory north of the Yellowstone. Custer's troops escorted a railroad surveying party here, due to similar attacks the year before. Battles such as Honsinger Bluff and Pease Bottom took place on land purchased by the United States from the Crow tribe on May 7, 1868. These continual attacks, and complaints from American Natives, prompted the Commissioner of Indian Affairs to assess the full situation on the northern plains. He said that the unfriendly Lakota roaming the land of other people should "be forced by the military to come in to the Great Sioux Reservation". That was in 1873, notably one year before the discovery of gold in the Black Hills, but the US government did not take action on this concept until three years later.

The Hunkpapa were among the victors in the Battle of Little Bighorn in the Crow Indian Reservation in July 1876.

During the 1870s, when the Native Americans of the Great Plains were fighting the United States, the Hunkpapa were led by Sitting Bull in the fighting, together with the Oglala Lakota. They were among the last of the tribes to go to the reservations. By 1891, the majority of Hunkpapa Lakota, about 571 people, resided in the Standing Rock Sioux Reservation of North and South Dakota. Since then they have not been counted separately from the rest of the Lakota.

== Population ==
The Hunkpapa population was estimated to be around 1,600 men, women and children in 1805, corresponding to 160 tipis. Shihasapa and Sans Arc migration to Hunkpapa camps in the 1840s had doubled their number of tipis in 1849. From a height in 1855 with 360 lodges, the next decades were marked by a small decline. The decline was higher in percentage of the total Lakota population.

In 1855, the total number of lodges were nearly 2,000, but fifteen years later only 315 tipis out of 2,400 were set up in Hunkpapa camps.

Since the 1880s, most Hunkpapa have lived in the Standing Rock Sioux Reservation (in North and South Dakota). It comprises land along the Grand River which had been used by the Arikara Indians in 1823.

== Notable Hunkpapa Lakota people ==
- Maria Yellow Horse Brave Heart, Hunkpapa social worker responsible for developing historical trauma models and interventions for Native American people
- Barbara May Cameron, photographer, poet, writer and human rights activist
- Ćehu′pa (Jaw) (c. 1853 – 1924), Hunkpapa Winter count keeper and Ledger Art artist Amidon Ledger, Macnider Ledger
- Dana Claxton (born 1959), filmmaker, photographer and performance artist
- Robert "Tree" Cody, flutist; enrolled member of the Maricopa tribe
- He Topa (Four Horns), 19th-century chief
- Iromagaja (Run-on-his-face) war chief fighting in the Battle of Little Bighorn
- Ernie LaPointe, Sun dancer, author and orator. He is great-grandson of Sitting Bull
- Athena LaTocha, painter
- Annie Little Warrior (1895 – c. 1966), ledger artist from Standing Rock, North Dakota
- Matȟó Čhuthúhu (Bear's Rib), 19th-century chief
- Zahn McClarnon, actor, whose mother is Hunkpapa Lakota; has had a continuing role on the series Longmire, among other work
- Amber Midthunder, actress
- Oni Sapa (Black Moon), 19th-century chief
- Tomi Kay Phillips (Cante Wakan Win), president of Sitting Bull College
- Phizí or Piji (Gall), war chief and one of the commanders in the Battle of Little Bighorn
- Ptesanwanyakapi (Mother Mary Catherine Sacred White Buffalo)
- Tȟatȟáŋka Íyotake (Sitting Bull), chief and leader of the Lakota in fighting against the US Army to remain off the reservations in the 19th-century
- Tȟašína Máni (Moving Robe Woman), fought in the battle of Little Big Horn
- Tȟatȟóka Íŋyaŋke (Running Antelope), Hunkpapa chief and advisor to Sitting Bull
- Laurel Vermillion, president of Sitting Bull College
- Waŋblí Ayútepiwiŋ (Eagle Woman) (1820–1888), Two Kettle and Hunkpapa diplomat, trader, and peace activist
