= Bear's Rib =

Húŋkpapȟa Lakota chief

Bear's Rib (Lakota: Matȟó Čhuthúhu; died October 8th, 1862) was a Húŋkpapȟa Lakota chief from the late 19th century who advocated for peace with the United States.

== Sources ==
- "Bears Rib" from Famous Indian Chiefs, page 20, from Axel-jacob.de, URL accessed 05/18/06
