= Tomi Kay Phillips =

American academic administrator

- Cante Wakan Win

President of Sitting Bull College
- Designate
- Assumed office January 1, 2024
- Preceded by: Laurel Vermillion

Personal details
- Children: 5
- Education: University of Mary; University of North Dakota

Tomi Kay Phillips (Lakota: Cante Wakan Win) is an American (Hunkpapa-Miniconjou) educator and academic administrator who has served as the president of Sitting Bull College since 2024.

== Life ==
Phillips is Hunkpapa and Minnecoujou Lakota. Her Lakota name is Cante Wakan Win. She was born to Maxine Claymore and Duane Phillips. Her maternal grandparents are Leona Many Wounds and Sam Claymore and her paternal grandparents are Emma Brush Horn and John Lends His Horses. Phillips earned a B.S. in elementary education from the University of Mary (UMary). She completed a M.S. in educational leadership from the University of North Dakota. She completed a doctorate in educational leadership and administration from UMary. Her 2020 dissertation was titled Native language and culture acquisition and native student success in school.

Phillips was a member of the United States Army. She worked as an educator for 28 years, including 18 years as an administrator. On August 1, 2023, she began mentoring under Sitting Bull College president Laurel Vermillion. Phillips assumed office on January 1, 2024.

Phillips has a partner and five children. As of 2023, she has resided in Standing Rock Indian Reservation for most of her life.
