= Danielle SeeWalker =

Lakota artist and activist

- Born: Bismarck, North Dakota, United States
- Website: www.seewalker.com

Danielle SeeWalker is an American self described "artivist," combining art and activism. She is a Húŋkpapȟa Lakȟóta citizen from the Standing Rock Sioux Tribe. She is a multimedia artist, and experiments with materials to combine traditional and modern techniques. Her work has been seen at the 2024 Super Bowl, on Disney+, and at the Denver Broncos Stadium.

== Biography ==
Danielle SeeWalker was born in Bismarck, North Dakota and is a Húŋkpapȟa Lakȟóta, part of the Standing Rock Sioux Tribe. She grew up on the East coast and attended high school in Philadelphia. Her childhood influenced her desire to break the cycles of poverty and mental health issues in Indigenous youth.

She then attended college, while working three jobs and becoming a mother. She earned a Master's degree in Counseling Psychology.

She co-founded the Red Road Project in 2013, which is a nonprofit organization to support cultural arts for Native American people in urban areas. She was a co-chair of the Denver American Indian Commission from 2020 to 2022, which worked on legislative matters related to Indigenous people in Colorado. She worked with Colorado Senator Jessie Danielson on the Prohibit American Indian Mascots bill in 2021, and the commission created the Office of Liaison for Missing and Murdered Indigenous Relatives in 2022.

In 2020, she published the book Still Here: A Past to Present Insight of Native American People and Culture.

== Art ==
SeeWalker is self-taught and began sharing her work in 2020. Her work includes murals, beadwork, and experimental combinations of traditional and modern art techniques.

In 2022, she had a show called "škhé: it is said" at the Littleton Museum.

In 2023, she won an Emmy for her illustrations for a PBS documentary titled A New Chapter.

SeeWalker gained national recognition with two major commissions from Paramount and Disney. Paramount commissioned a mural for the 2024 Super Bowl. Marvel Studios commissioned SeeWalker to create art for the Disney+ series Echo, which focuses on a Choctaw superhero called Maya Lopez.

SeeWalker has been part of the Denver Broncos Stadium Artist Series, and her mural can be seen inside the Mile High Stadium.

In 2024, SeeWalker curated an exhibition at History Colorado called "But We Have Something To Say," which opened in February 2024 and runs through September 15, 2024.

=== ACLU Lawsuit ===
In January 2024, SeeWalker was approached by officials from Vail, Colorado, who invited her to paint a mural in the town. This invitation was later redacted in May 2024, after officials expressed concerns about SeeWalker's plans to paint a mural paralleling the Gaza war with historical violence against Native American communities. Following media coverage, several other towns in Colorado extended invitations for SeeWalker to paint a mural elsewhere.

On October 14, 2024 the American Civil Liberties Union of Colorado filed a lawsuit with the town of Vail over its dismissal of SeeWalker's planned artist-in-residence. The suit, filed in U.S. District Court, states that the town violated SeeWalker's First Amendment rights in canceling her residency over political reasons before she'd even begun the residency. The lawsuit maintains that the cancellation caused her to lose out on jobs and came at a financial cost to her and her two children. In addition, the ACLU's announcement states that, "It also caused substantial emotional distress, shock, and sadness to SeeWalker and other Indigenous community members in the U.S."

== Personal life ==
SeeWalker has two sons.

SeeWalker is an Account Executive for Michelin.

== Recognition ==
- 2023, Emmy award, PBS documentary "A New Chapter."
- 2022, Denver Mayor's Awards for Excellence in Arts and Culture, Arts and Culture Innovation Award
