= Selfridge Public School =

Coordinates: 47.681723°N 99.131277°W

Selfridge Public Schools

Location
- 210 Second Avenue South; Selfridge, North Dakota 58568; United States

Information
- Type: Public
- Established: 1910
- School district: Selfridge Public School District
- Superintendent: Jim Gross
- Principal: HS: Kristi Miller
- Principal: ES: Kristi Miller
- Faculty: 20+
- Grades: K-12
- Enrollment: 55 (2023–2024)
- Classes: 20+
- Average class size: 15
- Classes offered: See Article
- Hours in school day: 8:15 A.M. - 3:30 P.M.
- Colors: Orange, White, Black
- Sports: See Article
- Mascot: Chieftain
- Newspaper: The Ridge Lines (prev. The Silver Star)
- Website: http://www.selfridge.k12.nd.us

Selfridge Public School is a public elementary school and high school located in Selfridge, North Dakota. The athletic teams are known as the "Chieftains" and "Warriors".

== District ==
Selfridge Public School District is a school district of the publicly funded school serving the town of Selfridge and the surrounding rural areas. District administration offices are in Selfridge. It has the largest land area of any other school district in Sioux County.

== Athletics ==
- Basketball (boys and girls)
- Football^{1}
- Track and Field (boys and girls)^{1}
- Volleyball^{1}
- Wrestling^{1}
- Cross Country^{1}
- Golf^{1}

^{1: This sport is joined with Standing Rock Community Grant High School.}

== Classes Offered ==
- Algebra
- Algebra II
- Geometry
- Consumer Math
- Life Science
- Earth Science
- Physical Science
- Biology
- Chemistry
- Physics
- ND History
- World History
- U.S. History
- Archaeology
- Citizenship
- Problems Of Democracy
- Women: Past and Present
- General Music
- Health
- Physical Education
- Family Living
- Spanish
- Art
- Consumer Education
- Personal Finance
- Lakota Language
- Online A+ Classes
- MREC Classes

== Extracurricular activities ==
- Student Council
