= Former Sioux County Courthouse (North Dakota) =

- Formerly listed on the U.S. National Register of Historic Places
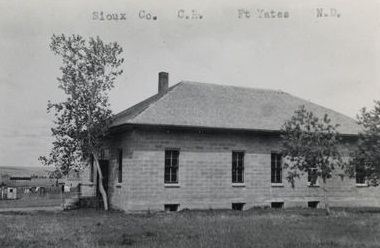
- Old Sioux County Courthouse, c. 1920s
- Location: Belden St., Fort Yates, North Dakota
- Area: less than one acre
- Built: 1922
- Built by: Ostrum, Adam Ulrich
- MPS: North Dakota County Courthouses TR
- NRHP reference No.: 85002993

Significant dates
- Added to NRHP: November 19, 1985
- Removed from NRHP: October 21, 2009

The Former Sioux County Courthouse in Fort Yates, North Dakota, United States, was built in 1922 by contractor Adam Ulrich Ostrum for Sioux County. It was listed on the National Register of Historic Places (NRHP) in 1985 but was delisted in 2009.

The NRHP nomination form described the building as "rather plain", of a type of "'pattern book' courthouses prevalent in North Dakota counties south and west of the Missouri River." The nomination suggested there was a lower awareness of the historic value of buildings in the area and noted that the listing "could encourage further preservation in the area."

Delisting of a National Register-listed property usually follows demolition or other loss of its historic integrity.
