= Cannonball River =

Tributary of the Missouri River

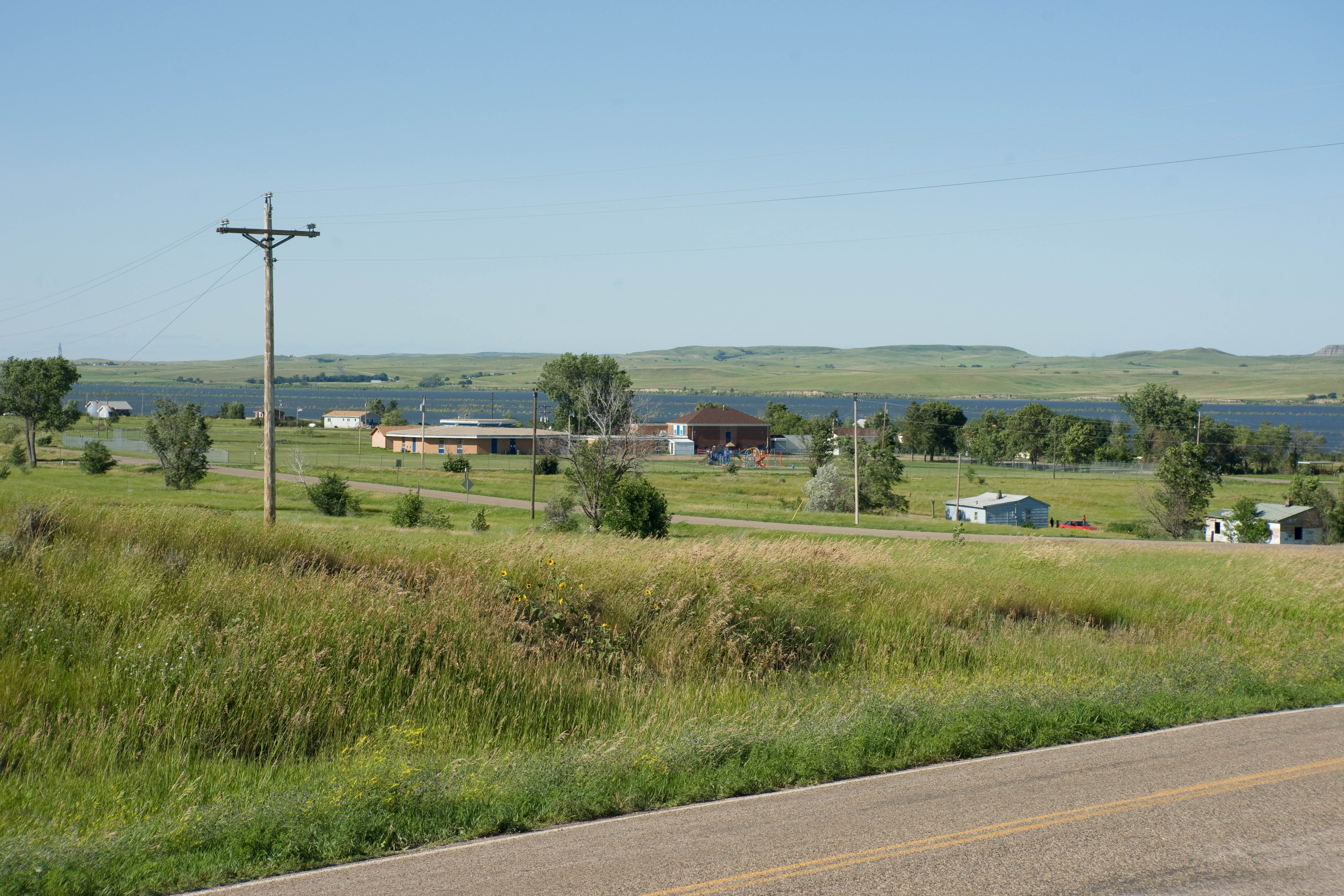
- The Cannonball River
- Native name: Íŋyaŋwakaǧapi Wakpá (Lakota)

Physical characteristics
- Source
  - location: Slope County in White Lake National Wildlife Refuge
  - coordinates: 46°28′12″N 103°12′24″W
  - elevation: 2,780 ft (850 m)
- Mouth
  - location: Confluence with Missouri River in Lake Oahe
  - coordinates: 46°25′45″N 100°35′21″W
  - elevation: 1,611 ft (491 m)
- Length: 135 mi (217 km)
- Discharge
  - location: Breien
  - average: 250 cu ft/s (7.1 m^{3}/s)

Basin features
- Progression: Cannonball River → Missouri → Mississippi → Gulf of Mexico
- GNIS ID: 1035898

The Cannonball River (Lakota: Íŋyaŋwakaǧapi Wakpá) is a tributary of the Missouri River, approximately 135 miles (217 km) long, in southwestern North Dakota in the United States.

It rises in the Little Missouri National Grassland, in the badlands north of Amidon in northern Slope County. It flows ESE past New England, Mott, and Burt. It is joined by Cedar Creek approximately 15 miles (24 km) southwest of Shields and flows northeast, past Shields, forming the northern border of Sioux County and the Standing Rock Sioux Reservation. It joins the Missouri in Lake Oahe near Cannon Ball. The cannonball concretions found in the vicinity of this river are the source of its name.

== See also ==
- List of rivers of North Dakota
