= Sitting Bull College =

Public tribal college in Fort Yates, North Dakota, U.S.

Coordinates: 46.0858°N 100.6742°W

- Former name: Standing Rock Community College
- Type: Public tribal land-grant college
- Established: 1973; 53 years ago
- Affiliations: Standing Rock Sioux tribe of the Standing Rock reservation in south-central North Dakota
- Academic affiliations: Space-grant
- President: Tomi Kay Phillips
- Undergraduates: 289
- Postgraduates: 28
- Location: Fort Yates, North Dakota, U.S.
- Campus: Standing Rock Sioux Reservation
- Colors: Blue & white
- Nickname: Suns
- Website: www.sittingbull.edu

Sitting Bull College (SBC) is a public tribal land-grant college in Fort Yates, North Dakota. It was founded in 1973 by the Standing Rock Sioux tribe of the Standing Rock Sioux Reservation in south-central North Dakota and north-central South Dakota. The SBC campuses are located in Fort Yates, North Dakota and McLaughlin, South Dakota. It serves as the primary educational institution on the Standing Rock Reservation.

== History ==
In 1973, the Standing Rock Sioux Tribal Council chartered Standing Rock Community College. The name was changed from Standing Rock College to Sitting Bull College in 1996. In 1994, the college was designated a land-grant college alongside 31 other tribal colleges.

== Academics ==
Sitting Bull College offers the Master of Science, Master of Education, Bachelor of Science, Associate of Arts, Associate of Science, and Associate of Applied Science degrees. It also offers certificates.

== Partnerships ==
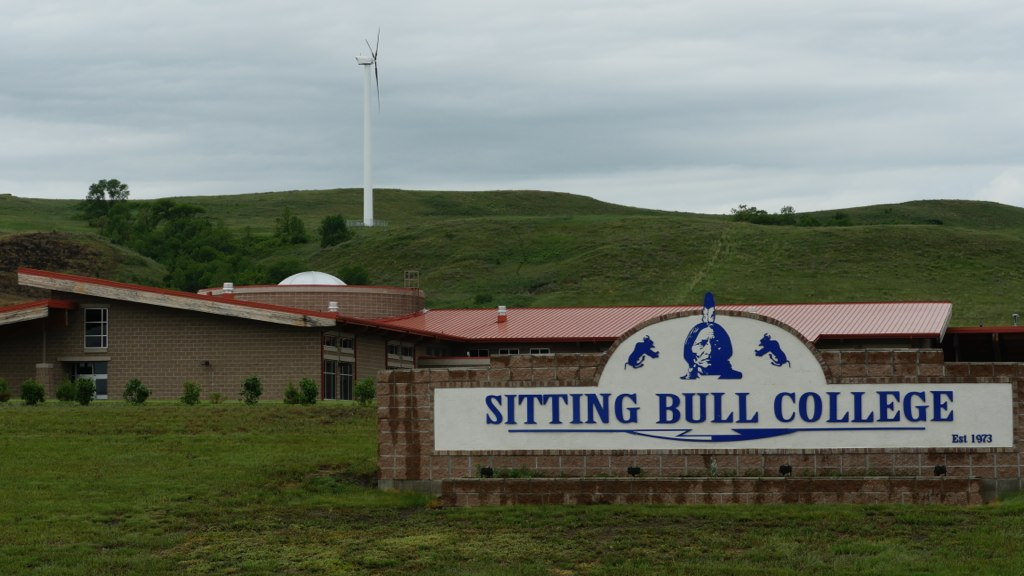
Image of main entrance to Sitting Bull College.

SBC is a member of the American Indian Higher Education Consortium (AIHEC), which is a community of tribally and federally chartered institutions working to strengthen tribal nations and make a lasting difference in the lives of American Indians and Alaska Natives. SBC was created in response to the higher education needs of American Indians. SBC generally serves geographically isolated populations that have no other means of accessing education beyond the high school level.

== Notable faculty ==
- Ron His Horse Is Thunder, former president of SBC
- Tomi Kay Phillips, incoming president of SBC
- Laurel Vermillion, president of SBC, 2006-2024
- Mary Louise Defender Wilson, instructor of tribal culture and language
