= KLND =

- Little Eagle, South Dakota; United States
- Broadcast area: North Central South Dakota
- Frequency: 89.5 MHz

Programming
- Format: Variety

Ownership
- Owner: Seventh Generation Media Services, Inc.

History
- First air date: 1997
- Former call signs: KAEN

Technical information
- Licensing authority: FCC
- Facility ID: 59762
- Class: C1
- ERP: 100,000 watts
- HAAT: 207 meters (679 feet)
- Transmitter coordinates: 45°44′54″N 100°48′30″W

Links
- Public license information: Public file; LMS
- Webcast: Listen Live
- Website: https://www.klndradio895.com/

KLND (89.5 FM) is a non-commercial radio station licensed to serve Little Eagle, South Dakota, United States. The station is owned by Seventh Generation Media Services, Inc. It airs a Variety format with news, public affairs, music and cultural programming for the people of Standing Rock and Cheyenne River and surrounding areas. The station's name in Lakota is Wolakota Wiconi Waste, meaning "through unity a good life."

The station was assigned the KLND call letters by the Federal Communications Commission on April 28, 1995.

== See also ==
- List of community radio stations in the United States
