= Shields, North Dakota =

Unincorporated community in North Dakota, United States

Shields, North Dakota Waháčhaŋka Otȟúŋwahe (Lakota)
- Unincorporated community
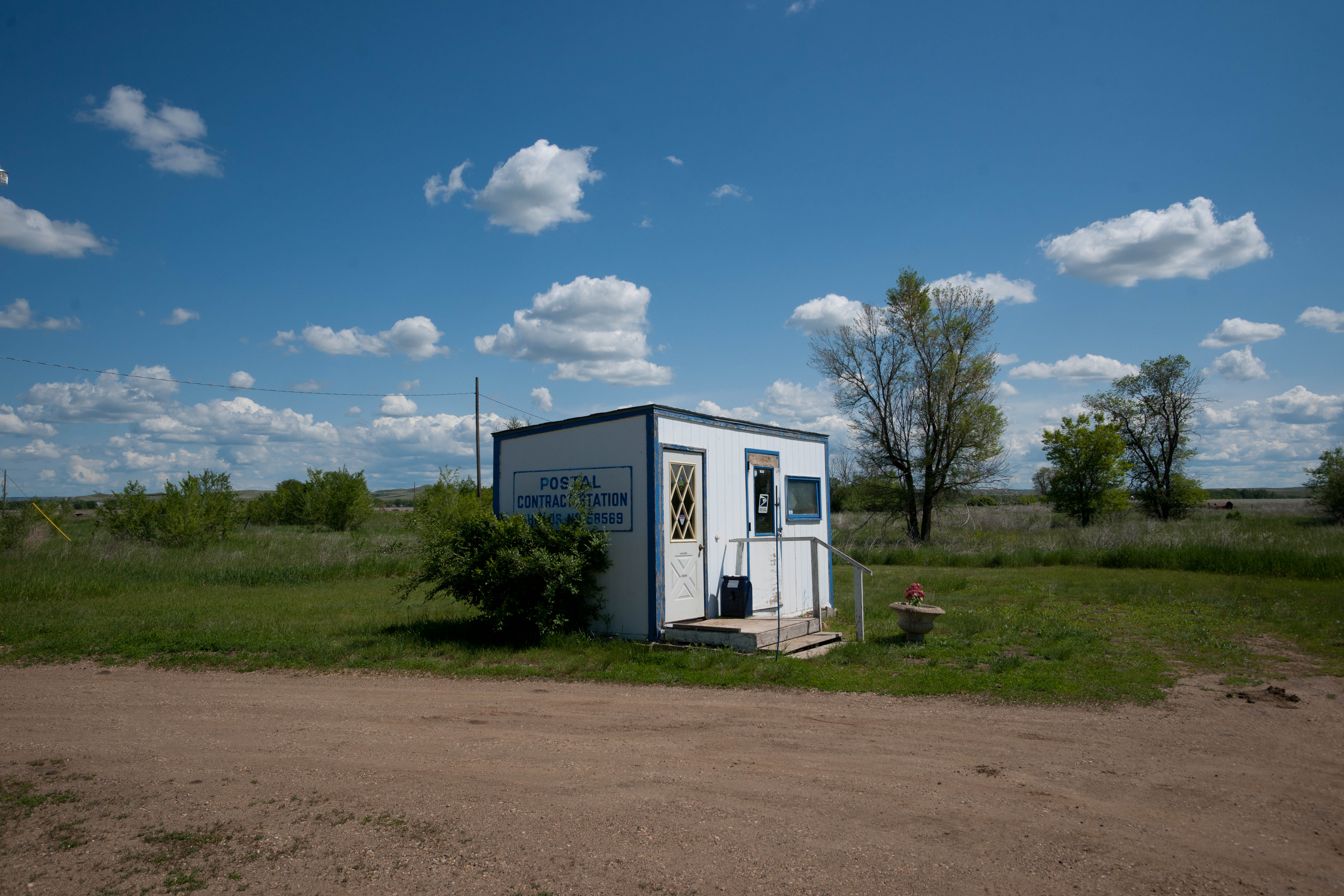
- Post contract station in Shields
- Nickname: "The Gateway City to Southern Grant County"
- Location within North Dakota Location within the United States
- Coordinates: 46°14′1″N 101°7′33″W
- Country: United States
- State: North Dakota
- County: Grant
- Elevation: 1,808 ft (551 m)
- Time zone: UTC-6 (Central (CST))
  - Summer (DST): UTC-5 (CDT)
- ZIP code: 58569
- Area code: 701
- GNIS feature ID: 1032061

Shields is an unincorporated community in Grant County, North Dakota, United States. Founded by Nathaniel J. Shields and his wife Mary and their four children in 1896. Shields' population peaked in 1920 with 250 people. Its elevation is 1,808 feet (551 m) above sea level. It has a post office with the ZIP code 58569.

== History ==
Shields was established September 16, 1896, when Nathaniel J. Shields established a rural post office in his sod home. Shields and his wife Mary had four children, Mark, Arthur, Maude (Browning), and Laura (Martin) who were the first to live in Shields in the 1880s, when the Dakota Territory still existed. Nathaniel Shields built St. James Catholic Church in 1890 and other buildings. The government soon designated Shields as a village in 1891. In 1901, the townsite was relocated two miles south, along the banks of the Cannonball River. The town grew initially, reporting a population of 250 in the 1920s. Shields billed itself as "The Gateway City of Southern Grant County". By 1923, no sod houses existed in Shields; they were replaced by wooden homes. Three of the most famous Native Americans lived near or in Shields at one time, Rain-in-the-Face, Chief Gall, and Sitting Bull. The population declined to just 99 in 1950. In 2002, it was reported that 15 people called Shields home. Likely in the 1990s, the school building was expanded and turned into a Bar and Grill. In 2014, the school was razed, but the Shields Bar still remains in operation, as the only business left. In 2018, the population was estimated to be less than 10.

== 2002 wildfire ==
On July 1, 2002, a wildfire destroyed most of Shields, destroying 30 structures and displacing 15 families. The wildfire was said to be caused by lightning striking dry pastures. After the fire, the Bismarck Tribune newspaper ran a headline asking "Is this the end of Shields?", and the local sheriff was quoted saying "There is no more Shields." However, one resident interviewed by the paper said the community would survive.

== Climate ==
This climatic region is typified by large seasonal temperature differences, with warm to hot (and often humid) summers and cold (sometimes severely cold) winters. According to the Köppen Climate Classification system, Shields has a humid continental climate, abbreviated "Dfb" on climate maps.
