= Fort Yates, North Dakota =

- City
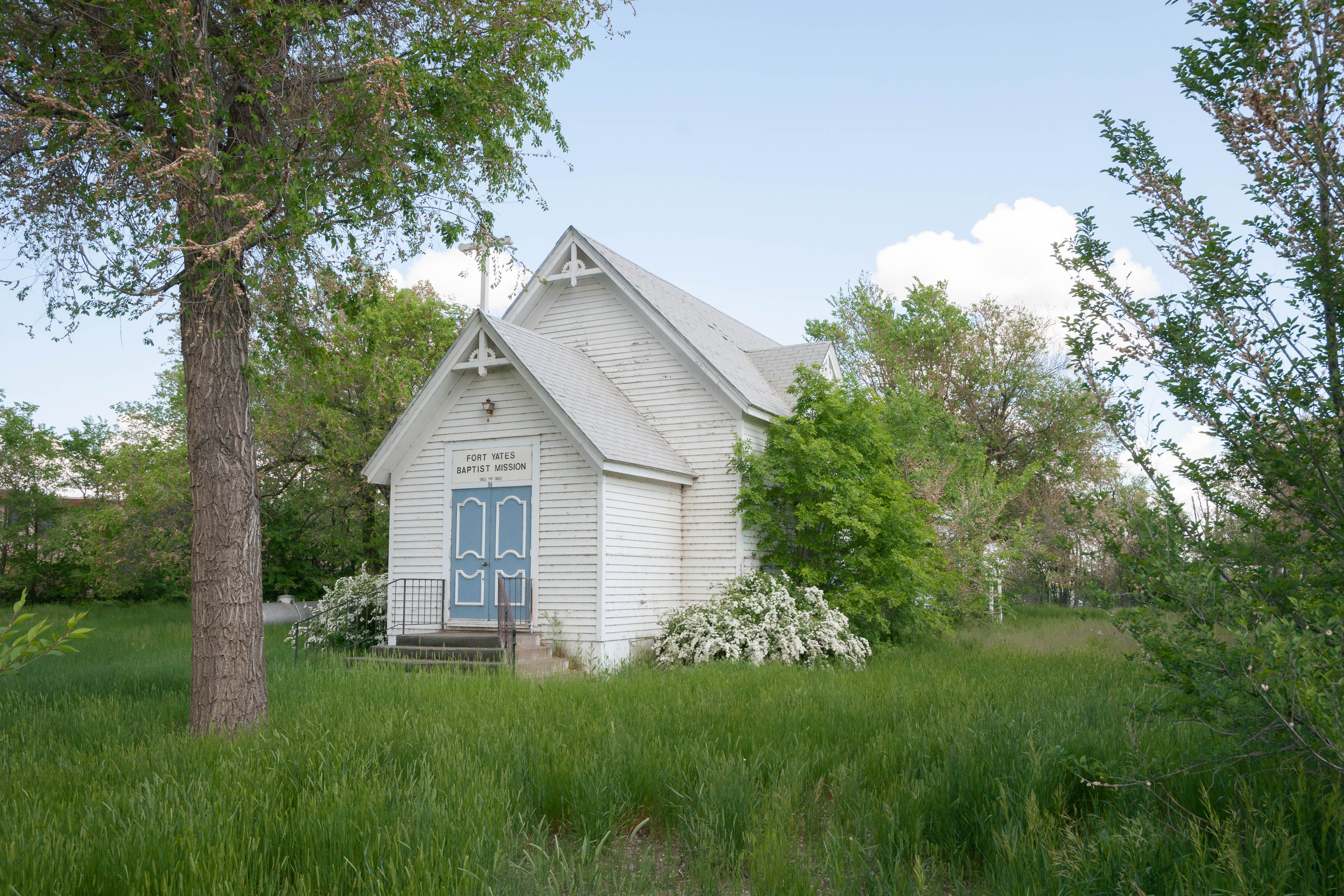
- Fort Yates Baptist Mission in Fort Yates

- Location of Fort Yates, North Dakota
- Coordinates: 46°05′12″N 100°37′48″W
- Country: United States
- Indian Reservation: Standing Rock Sioux Reservation
- State: North Dakota
- County: Sioux
- Founded: 1863

Area
  - Total: 0.062 sq mi (0.16 km^{2})
  - Land: 0.062 sq mi (0.16 km^{2})
  - Water: 0 sq mi (0.00 km^{2})
- Elevation: 1,634 ft (498 m)

Population (2020)
  - Total: 176
  - Estimate (2022): 169
  - Density: 2,918.0/sq mi (1,126.65/km^{2})
- Time zone: UTC-6 (Central (CST))
  - Summer (DST): UTC-5 (CDT)
- ZIP code: 58538
- Area code: 701
- FIPS code: 38-27860
- GNIS feature ID: 1036043

Fort Yates is a city in Sioux County, North Dakota, United States. It is the tribal headquarters of the Standing Rock Sioux Tribe and county seat of Sioux County. Since 1970 the population has declined markedly from more than 1,100 residents, as people have left for other locations for work. The population was 176 at the 2020 census.

== History ==
A primarily Native American settlement developed here after a US Army post at this site was established in 1863 as the Standing Rock Cantonment, intended for the US Army garrison to oversee the Hunkpapa and Blackfeet bands, and the Inhunktonwan and Cuthead of the Upper Yanktonai, of the Lakota Oyate. In 1878 the US Army renamed the fort to honor Captain George Yates, who was killed by the Lakota Oyate at the Battle of Little Big Horn in 1876. The town that developed was also known as Fort Yates. The Army post and fort were decommissioned in 1903.

Fort Yates also served as the headquarters of the US Standing Rock Indian Agency, which in the late 19th century was headed by US Indian Service Agent James McLaughlin. Worried about the Hunkpapa Lakota chief Sitting Bull possibly taking part in the Ghost Dance movement, he ordered the arrest of the chief on December 14, 1890. During the bungled event the chief was shot and killed at dawn in his log cabin by agency non-Hunkpapa Dakota police.

Sitting Bull was buried at Fort Yates. In 1953, his family authorized his remains to be exhumed and transferred to a gravesite overlooking the Missouri River near his birthplace at Mobridge, South Dakota. A monument dedicated to Sitting Bull was installed at his burial site at Fort Yates. Another monument, with his bust on a pedestal, overlooks the Missouri River at the Mobridge burial site.

This city has become the tribal headquarters of the federally recognized Standing Rock Sioux Tribe, whose reservation encompasses it. They founded Sitting Bull College in Fort Yates, a tribal college now named for their noted 19th-century leader. Known also as "Long Soldier", it is the most populous electoral district of the reservation.

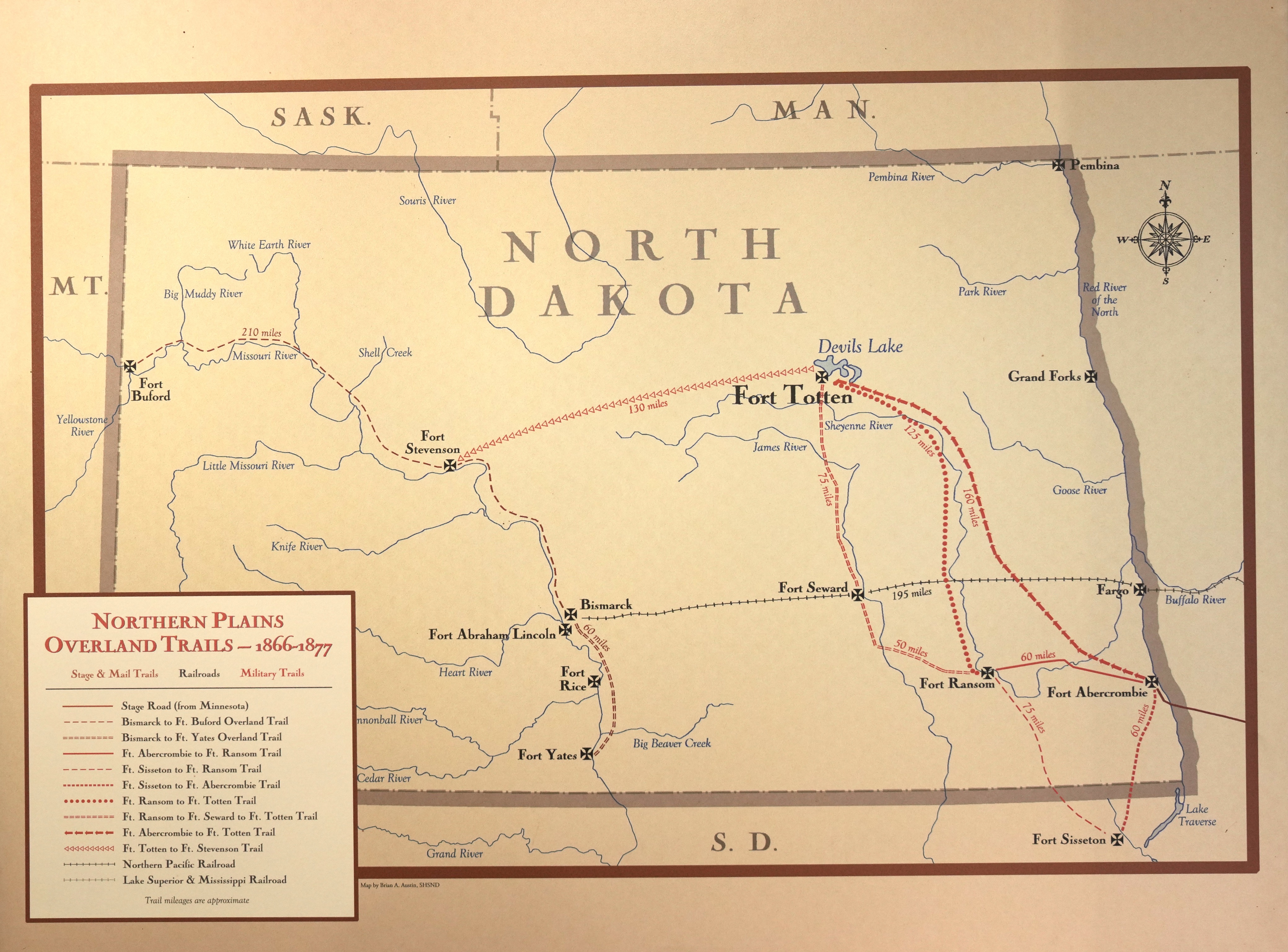
Northern Plains Overland Trails 1866–1877 map on display at the Fort Totten Historic Site

== Geography and climate ==
Fort Yates is located on the western bank of Lake Oahe.

According to the United States Census Bureau, the hamlet has a total area of 0.06 square miles (0.16 km^{2}), all land. Fort Yates has a semiarid climate (Köppen BSk), with hot summers, cold and very dry winters (though sometimes moderated by chinook winds) and substantial diurnal temperature ranges. On February 2, 1992, the hamlet recorded 72 °F or 22.2 °C, the highest ever recorded for any winter month in North Dakota. Depending on the climatic maps and the data used the hamlet can be considered the northernmost urban area of the humid continental climate (Dfa) in an isolated occurrence at 46 °N. At the same time that Fort Yates is around different climatic types and subtypes in a situation rare and unusual. Dfb to the northeast and west, Dwb to the northwest and east, BSk to the southwest and south, and Dwa to the west.

Climate data for Fort Yates, North Dakota (1981-2010)
Month	Jan	Feb	Mar	Apr	May	Jun	Jul	Aug	Sep	Oct	Nov	Dec	Year
Record high °F (°C)	64 (18)	72 (22)	85 (29)	99 (37)	107 (42)	110 (43)	119 (48)	111 (44)	107 (42)	95 (35)	80 (27)	69 (21)	119 (48)
Mean daily maximum °F (°C)	27.3 (−2.6)	32.5 (0.3)	43.3 (6.3)	59.2 (15.1)	70.4 (21.3)	80.1 (26.7)	87.1 (30.6)	86.0 (30.0)	74.2 (23.4)	60.8 (16.0)	42.3 (5.7)	29.4 (−1.4)	57.8 (14.3)
Daily mean °F (°C)	14.6 (−9.7)	19.9 (−6.7)	30.5 (−0.8)	41.1 (5.1)	56.0 (13.3)	65.6 (18.7)	72.0 (22.2)	70.4 (21.3)	58.8 (14.9)	46.1 (7.8)	30.5 (−0.8)	17.8 (−7.9)	44.0 (6.7)
Mean daily minimum °F (°C)	2.0 (−16.7)	7.3 (−13.7)	17.6 (−8.0)	28.9 (−1.7)	41.5 (5.3)	51.2 (10.7)	56.9 (13.8)	54.8 (12.7)	43.4 (6.3)	31.3 (−0.4)	18.6 (−7.4)	6.1 (−14.4)	30.1 (−1.1)
Record low °F (°C)	−41 (−41)	−50 (−46)	−33 (−36)	−7 (−22)	16 (−9)	28 (−2)	28 (−2)	29 (−2)	15 (−9)	−4 (−20)	−23 (−31)	−34 (−37)	−50 (−46)
Average precipitation inches (mm)	0.19 (4.8)	0.32 (8.1)	0.55 (14)	1.04 (26)	2.49 (63)	2.83 (72)	2.39 (61)	1.57 (40)	1.49 (38)	1.30 (33)	0.43 (11)	0.23 (5.8)	14.83 (376.7)
Average snowfall inches (cm)	6.1 (15)	9.6 (24)	11.3 (29)	2.3 (5.8)	0.0 (0.0)	0.0 (0.0)	0.0 (0.0)	0.0 (0.0)	0.0 (0.0)	0.3 (0.76)	2.0 (5.1)	4.8 (12)	36.2 (92)
Source: NOAA, WRCC

== Demographics ==
Historical population
Census	Pop.	Note	%±
1880	446		—
1890	511		14.6%
1970	1,153		—
1980	771		−33.1%
1990	183		−76.3%
2000	228		24.6%
2010	184		−19.3%
2020	176		−4.3%
2022 (est.)	169		−4.0%
U.S. Decennial Census; 2020 Census

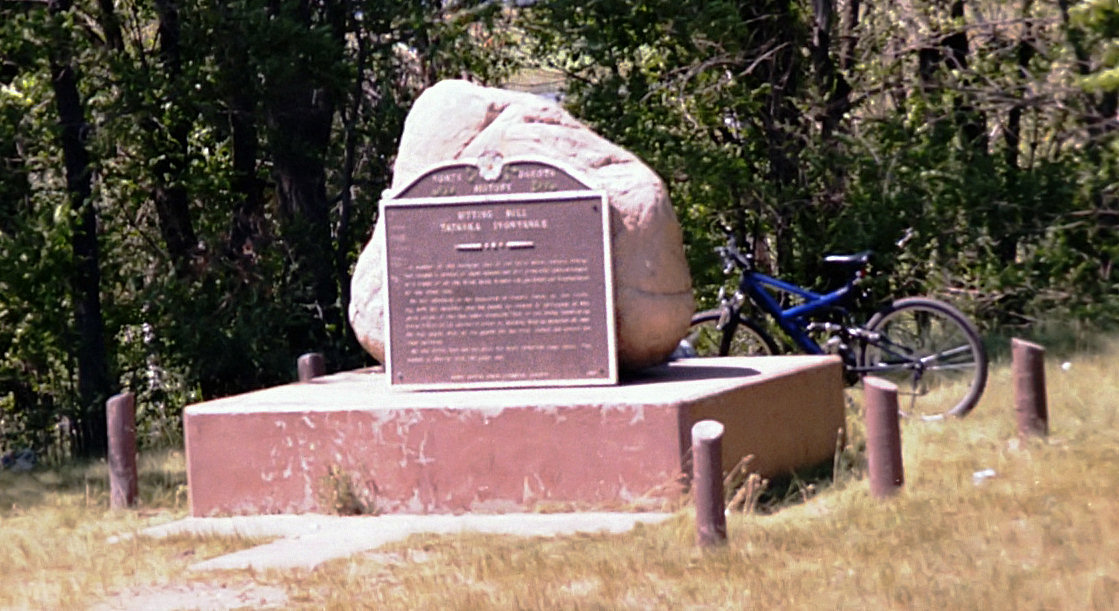
Sitting Bull Monument, Ft. Yates, North Dakota

=== 2010 census ===
As of the census of 2010, there were 184 people, 66 households, and 43 families residing in the hamlet. The population density was 3,066.7 inhabitants per square mile (1,184.1/km^{2}). There were 73 housing units at an average density of 1,216.7 per square mile (469.8/km^{2}). The racial makeup of the hamlet was 5.4% White, 92.4% Native American, 0.5% from other races, and 1.6% from two or more races. Hispanic or Latino of any race were 2.2% of the population.

There were 66 households, of which 45.5% had children under the age of 18 living with them, 22.7% were married couples living together, 30.3% had a female householder with no husband present, 12.1% had a male householder with no wife present, and 34.8% were non-families. 28.8% of all households were made up of individuals, and 7.5% had someone living alone who was 65 years of age or older. The average household size was 2.79 and the average family size was 3.26.

The median age in the hamlet was 33.6 years. 31% of residents were under the age of 18; 8.7% were between the ages of 18 and 24; 27.6% were from 25 to 44; 22.8% were from 45 to 64; and 9.8% were 65 years of age or older. The gender makeup of the hamlet was 53.3% male and 46.7% female.

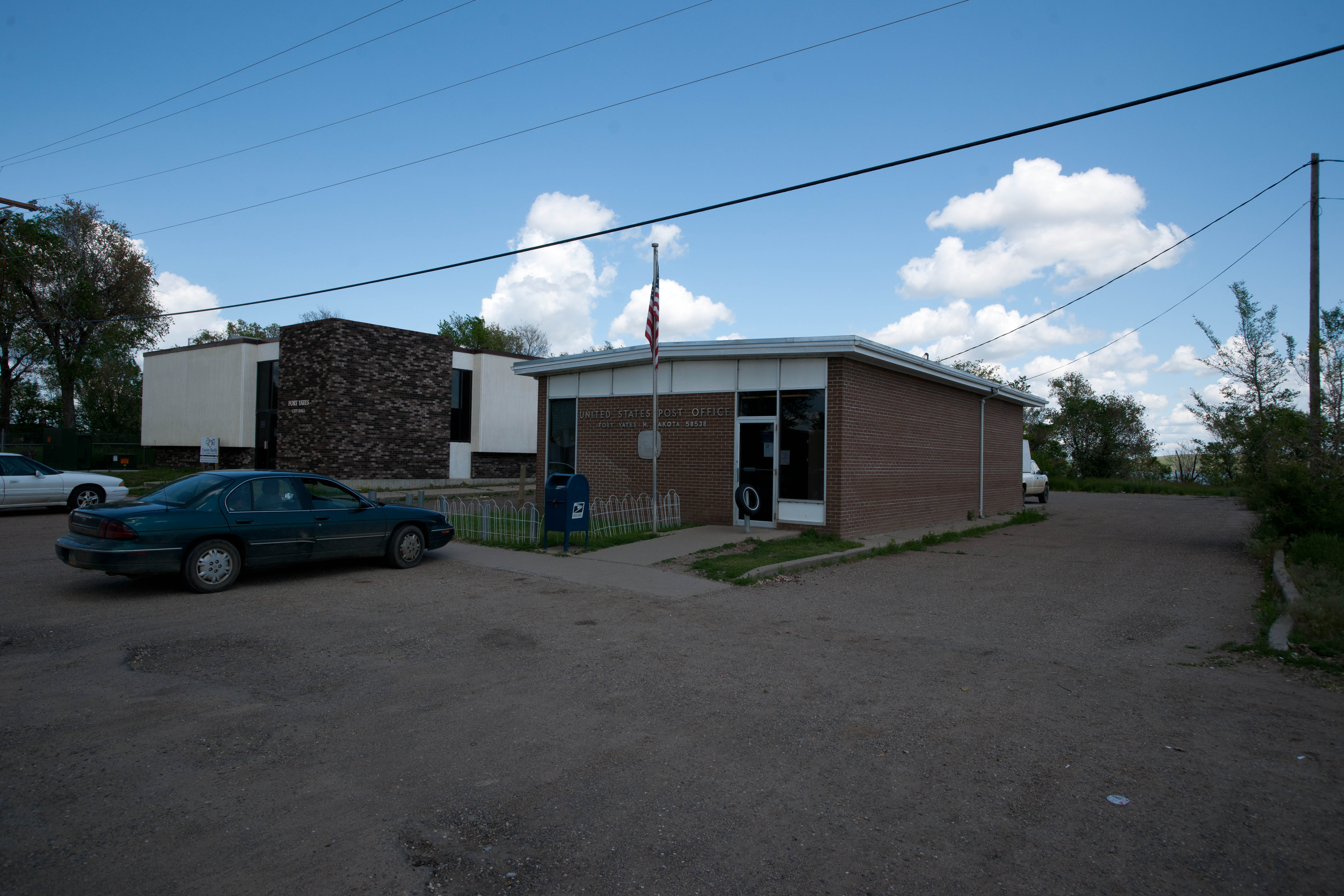
U.S. Post office in Fort Yates

=== 2000 census ===
As of the census of 2000, there were 228 people, 73 households, and 47 families residing in the hamlet. The population density was 3,688.4 inhabitants per square mile (1,424.1/km^{2}). There were 78 housing units at an average density of 1,261.8 per square mile (487.2/km^{2}). The racial makeup of the hamlet was 93.42% Native American, 5.26% White, and 1.32% from two or more races. Hispanic or Latino of any race were 3.95% of the population.

There were 73 households, out of which 35.6% had children under the age of 18 living with them, 28.8% were married couples living together, 26.0% had a female householder with no husband present, and 35.6% were non-families. 26.0% of all households were made up of individuals, and 6.8% had someone living alone who was 65 years of age or older. The average household size was 3.12 and the average family size was 3.85.

In the hamlet the population was spread out, with 35.5% under the age of 18, 15.4% from 18 to 24, 28.9% from 25 to 44, 14.9% from 45 to 64, and 5.3% who were 65 years of age or older. The median age was 24 years. For every 100 females, there were 94.9 males. For every 100 females age 18 and over, there were 88.5 males.

The median income for a household in the town was $25,500, and the median income for a family was $31,875. Males had a median income of $26,125 versus $25,000 for females. The per capita income for the town was $9,512. About 6.4% of families and 14.4% of the population were below the poverty line, including 8.2% of those under the age of eighteen and 17.6% of those 65 or over.

== Fort Yates water treatment plant ==
The water treatment plant at Fort Yates, an integral part of The Standing Rock Rural Water System, is the primary source of drinking water for over three thousand people which includes the residents of Porcupine, Cannonball and Fort Yates as well the Prairie Knights Casino and Lodge. The intake is on the Missouri River.

== Education ==
It is in the Fort Yates School District, which is integrated with the Standing Rock Community School.

== See also ==
- Prairie Knights Casino and Resort
- Former Sioux County Courthouse (North Dakota)
