= Fort Yates School District =

School district in North Dakota, United States

Address
- 9189 1/2 Highway 24 Fort Yates, North Dakota, 58538; United States

District information
- Type: Public
- Grades: 5–8 (Other grades go to SCRS facilities)
- NCES District ID: 3807200

Students and staff
- Students: 108
- Teachers: 15.0
- Staff: 22.0
- Student–teacher ratio: 7.2

Other information
- Website: www.fort-yates.k12.nd.us

Fort Yates Public School District #4 is a school district headquartered in Fort Yates, North Dakota.

In addition to Fort Yates, the district serves Porcupine and a small section of Cannon Ball.

The district has an agreement with the Standing Rock Sioux Tribe to jointly operate the school system. Accordingly, the Standing Rock Community School (SRCS) a.k.a. Standing Rock Community Grant School (SRCGS) is affiliated with the Bureau of Indian Education (BIE). The BIE grant school facility, as of 2003, serves elementary and high school students while the school district's facility houses middle school.

== History ==
The Fort Yates school district and Standing Rock grant school were operating in an agreement with one another until the 1980s.

In 2003 the district entered into a cooperative agreement with the Standing Rock Sioux Tribe that would allow the two parties to jointly operate a single K-12 school system. Prior to 2003 the two school systems had grades 7-8 as middle school, but the recombined system now has grades 6-8 as middle school. Groundbreaking for the current middle school facility opened in 2004, and it opened in 2005. The federal funding from the BIE status was needed since, as of 2003, 36% of the land in the boundaries of the Fort Yates district is taxable, leaving it with insufficient ability to raise funds for a new school. Class sizes increased and available funds increased as budgets and classrooms combined.

In 2016 the Fort Yates/Standing Rock school system joined the Turnaround Arts program, which was offered by the Executive Branch of the United States.

In 2020 it had over 650 students. When the COVID-19 pandemic in North Dakota forced the district to end in-person classes, laptops were donated to students so they could do distance learning.

== Operations ==
The Fort Yates district and Standing Rock Grant School each have their own school board, superintendent, and budget.

== Campuses ==
The current 77,000-square-foot (7,200 m^{2}) Standing Rock Middle School, built for $11,600,000 and partly financed by a grant from the United States Department of Education worth $4,600,000, was dedicated in 2005.

== Athletics ==
By 1989 Fort Yates and Standing Rock entered into a cooperative agreement regarding their sports teams. Therefore, that year several of the sports teams of Fort Yates Public and Standing Rock Community had merged, although some remained separate. The two teams agreed to a breakup because they each wanted their own boys' basketball team.
