= Porcupine, North Dakota =

- Census-designated place & Unincorporated community
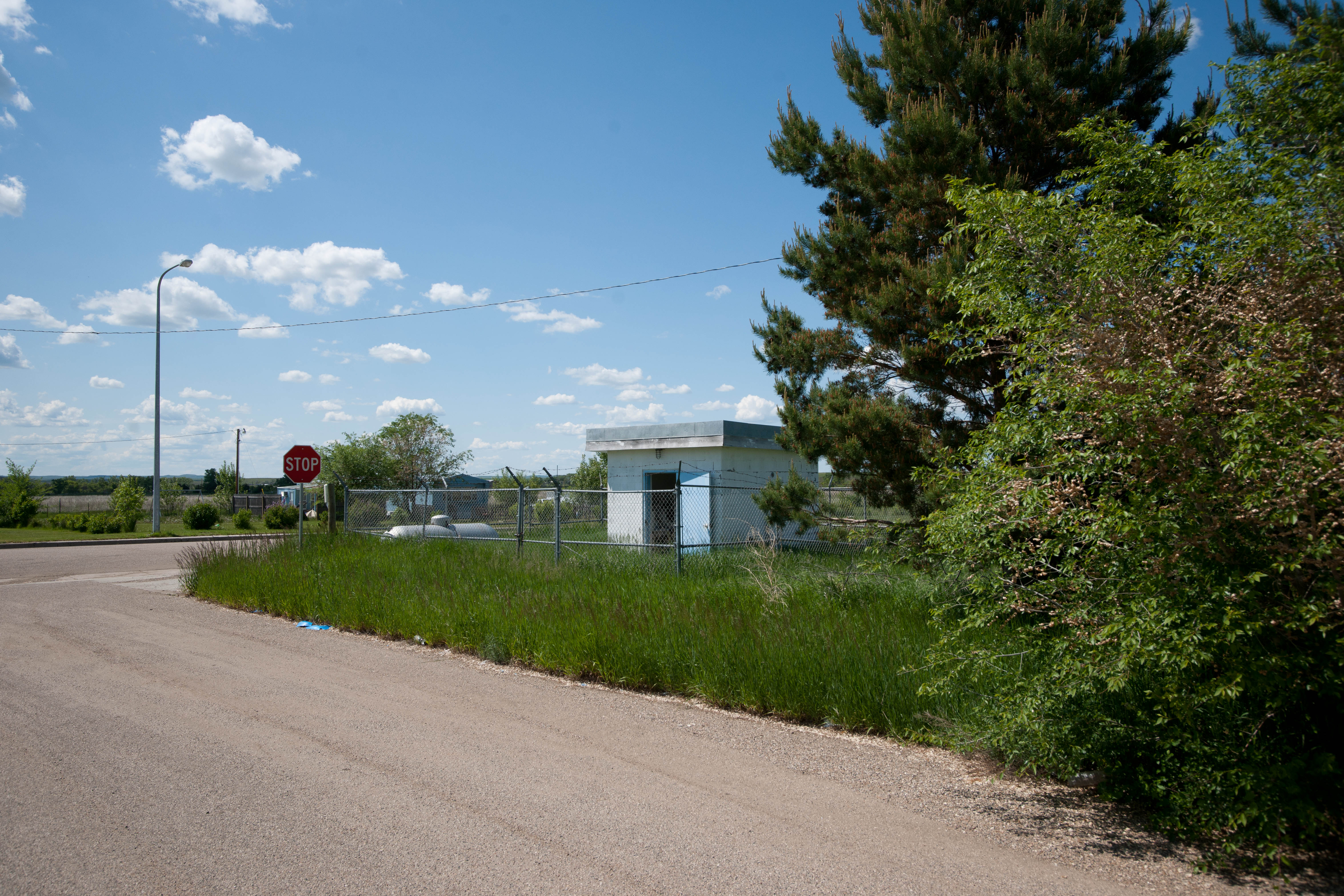
- Street in Porcupine

- Location within North Dakota Location within the United States
- Coordinates: 46°13′19″N 101°06′00″W
- Country: United States
- State: North Dakota
- County: Sioux

Area
  - Total: 0.20 sq mi (0.52 km^{2})
  - Land: 0.20 sq mi (0.52 km^{2})
  - Water: 0 sq mi (0.00 km^{2})
- Elevation: 1,801 ft (549 m)

Population (2020)
  - Total: 197
  - Density: 975.4/sq mi (376.62/km^{2})
- Time zone: UTC-6 (Central (CST))
  - Summer (DST): UTC-5 (CDT)
- ZIP code: 58568
- Area code: 701
- GNIS feature ID: 2585499

Porcupine is a census-designated place in Sioux County, North Dakota, United States. It lies only a few minutes' drive from the city of Selfridge. The community includes the headquarters of the Selfridge/Porcupine district.

An unincorporated community, it was designated as part of the U.S. Census Bureau's Participant Statistical Areas Program on March 22, 2010. It was not counted separately during the 2000 census, but was included in the 2010 census, where a population of 146 was reported. The population was 197 at the 2020 census.

== Demographics ==
Historical population
Census	Pop.	Note	%±
2010	146		—
2020	197		34.9%
U.S. Decennial Census; 2020 Census

== Transportation ==
The only access to the town is B.I.A Road 7 from North Dakota State Highway 6.

== Education ==
It is in the Fort Yates School District, which is integrated with Standing Rock Community School.
