= Little Eagle, South Dakota =

Little Eagle, South Dakota Waŋblí Čik’ala
- CDP
- Location in Corson County and the state of South Dakota
- Coordinates: 45°41′00″N 100°47′48″W
- Country: United States
- State: South Dakota
- County: Corson

Area
  - Total: 1.42 sq mi (3.69 km^{2})
  - Land: 1.40 sq mi (3.62 km^{2})
  - Water: 0.027 sq mi (0.07 km^{2})
- Elevation: 1,647 ft (502 m)

Population (2020)
  - Total: 367
  - Density: 262.5/sq mi (101.37/km^{2})
- Time zone: UTC-7 (Mountain (MST))
  - Summer (DST): UTC-6 (MDT)
- ZIP code: 57639
- Area code: 605
- FIPS code: 46-37900
- GNIS feature ID: 2393103

Little Eagle (Lakota: Waŋblí Čik’ala) is a census-designated place (CDP) in Corson County, South Dakota, United States. As of the 2020 census, Little Eagle had a population of 367.

The community has the name of a Native American chieftain.

== Geography ==
According to the United States Census Bureau, the CDP has a total area of 1.4 square miles (3.6 km^{2}), of which 1.4 square miles (3.6 km^{2}) is land and 0.04 square miles (0.10 km^{2}) (2.10%) is water.

== Demographics ==
Historical population
Census	Pop.	Note	%±
2020	367		—
U.S. Decennial Census

As of the census of 2000, there were 370 people, 71 households, and 60 families residing in the CDP. The population density was 262.9 inhabitants per square mile (101.5/km^{2}). There were 74 housing units at an average density of 52.6 per square mile (20.3/km^{2}). The racial makeup of the CDP was 0.54% White, 99.19% Native American, and 0.27% from two or more races. Hispanic or Latino of any race were 2.70% of the population.

There were 71 households, out of which 53.5% had children under the age of 18 living with them, 28.2% were married couples living together, 40.8% had a female householder with no husband present, and 14.1% were non-families. 9.9% of all households were made up of individuals, and 1.4% had someone living alone who was 65 years of age or older. The average household size was 5.21 and the average family size was 5.43.

In the CDP, the population was spread out, with 48.4% under the age of 18, 13.8% from 18 to 24, 24.1% from 25 to 44, 10.8% from 45 to 64, and 3.0% who were 65 years of age or older. The median age was 19 years. For every 100 females, there were 87.8 males. For every 100 females age 18 and over, there were 96.9 males.

The median income for a household in the CDP was $12,500, and the median income for a family was $11,528. Males had a median income of $20,625 versus $12,321 for females. The per capita income for the CDP was $3,632. About 75.4% of families and 73.4% of the population were below the poverty line, including 76.8% of those under age 18 and 50.0% of those age 65 or over.

== Local media ==
=== FM Radio ===
FM radio stations
Frequency	Call sign	Name	Format	Owner	Target city/market	City of license
89.5 FM	KLND, "The Lodge of Good Voices"		Variety	Seventh Generation Media Services, Inc	Little Eagle	Little Eagle

== Notable person ==
- Tȟatȟóka Íŋyaŋke (Running Antelope) is buried at the Long Hill Cemetery east of Little Eagle
