= Standing Rock Sioux Reservation =

Native American reservation in the United States

Standing Rock Sioux Tribe of North & South Dakota Standing Rock Reservation Íŋyaŋ Woslál Háŋ (Lakota)
- Indian reservation
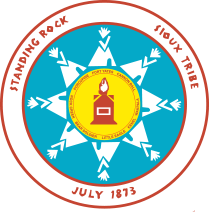
- Seal as of August 2016
- Anthem: "Wapaha kiŋ kekah'boyaŋhan" and "Lakota Flag Song" (used for some occasions)
- Standing Rock Reservation straddles the border between North and South Dakota
- Coordinates: 45°45′0″N 101°12′0″W
- Country: United States
- State: North Dakota; South Dakota
- North Dakota Counties: Sioux County
- South Dakota Counties: Corson County; Dewey County; Ziebach County

Area
  - Land: 3,571.9 sq mi (9,251.2 km^{2})

Population (2010)
  - Total: 8,217 (15,568 total enrollment)
  - Density: 2.300/sq mi (0.8882/km^{2})
- Time zone: UTC-5 (Central (CST))
  - Summer (DST): UTC-4 (CST)
- ZIP code: 58538
- Area code: 701
- GDP: $191.9 Million (2018)
- Website: standingrock.org

The Standing Rock Sioux Tribe of North & South Dakota controls the Standing Rock Reservation (Lakota: Íŋyaŋ Woslál Háŋ), which straddles the border between North and South Dakota in the United States, and is inhabited by ethnic "Hunkpapa and Sihasapa bands of Lakota Oyate and the Ihunktuwona and Pabaksa bands of the Dakota Oyate," as well as the Hunkpatina Dakota (Lower Yanktonai). The Ihanktonwana Dakota are the Upper Yanktonai, part of the collective of Wiciyena. The sixth-largest Native American reservation in land area in the US, Standing Rock includes all of Sioux County, North Dakota, and all of Corson County, South Dakota, plus slivers of northern Dewey and Ziebach counties in South Dakota, along their northern county lines at Highway 20.

The reservation has a land area of 3,571.9 square miles (9,251.2 km^{2}), twice the size of the U.S. state of Delaware, and has a population of 8,217 as of the 2010 census. There are 15,568 enrolled members of the tribe. The largest communities on the reservation are Fort Yates, Cannon Ball (both located in Northern Standing Rock) and McLaughlin (located in Southern Standing Rock).

== History ==
Together with the Hunkpapa and Sihasapa bands, the Standing Rock Sioux Tribe is part of what was known as the Great Sioux Nation. The peoples were highly decentralized. In 1868 the lands of the Great Sioux Nation were reduced in the Fort Laramie Treaty to the east side of the Missouri River and the state line of South Dakota in the west. The Black Hills, considered by the Sioux to be sacred land, are located in the center of territory awarded to the tribe.

In 1874, in direct violation of the treaty, General George A. Custer and his 7th Cavalry entered the Black Hills and discovered gold, starting a gold rush. The United States government wanted to buy or rent the Black Hills from the Lakota people, but led by their spiritual leader Sitting Bull, they refused to sell or rent their lands. The Great Sioux War of 1876 was a series of battles and negotiations that occurred between 1876 and 1877, with the Lakota Sioux and Northern Cheyenne warring against the United States. Among the many battles and skirmishes of the war was the Battle of the Little Bighorn, often known as Custer's Last Stand, the most storied of the many encounters between the U.S. army and mounted Plains Native Americans. It was an overwhelming Native American victory. The U.S. with its superior resources was soon able to force the Native Americans to surrender, primarily by attacking and destroying their encampments and property. The Agreement of 1877 (19 Stat. 254, enacted February 28, 1877) officially annexed Sioux land and permanently established Native American reservations. Under the Agreement of 1877 the U.S. government took the Black Hills from the Sioux Nation.

In February 1890, the United States government broke another Lakota treaty by breaking up the Great Sioux Reservation, an area that formerly encompassed the majority of the state. It reduced it and divided it into five smaller reservations. The government was accommodating white homesteaders from the eastern United States; in addition, it intended to "break up tribal relationships" and "conform Indians to the white man's ways, peaceably if they will, or forcibly if they must". On the reduced reservations, the government allocated family units on 320-acre (1.3 km^{2}) plots for individual households.

Although the Lakota were historically a nomadic people living in tipis, and their Plains Native American culture was based strongly upon buffalo and horse culture, they were expected to farm and raise livestock. With the goal of assimilation, in the late 19th and early 20th centuries, they were forced to send their children to boarding schools; the schools taught English and Christianity, as well as American cultural practices. Generally, they forbade inclusion of Native American traditional culture and language. The children were beaten if they tried to do anything related to their native culture.

The farming plan failed to take into account the difficulty that Lakota farmers would have in trying to cultivate crops in the semi-arid region of South Dakota. By the end of the 1890 growing season, a time of intense heat and low rainfall, it was clear that the land was unable to produce substantial agricultural yields. As the bison had been virtually eradicated a few years earlier, the Lakota were at risk of starvation. The people turned to the Ghost Dance ritual, which frightened the supervising agents of the Bureau of Indian Affairs. Agent James McLaughlin asked for more troops. He claimed that spiritual leader Sitting Bull was the real leader of the movement. A former agent, Valentine McGillycuddy, saw nothing extraordinary in the dances and ridiculed the panic that seemed to have overcome the agencies, saying: "The coming of the troops has frightened the Indians. If the Seventh-Day Adventists prepare the ascension robes for the Second Coming of the Savior, the United States Army is not put in motion to prevent them. Why should not the Indians have the same privilege? If the troops remain, trouble is sure to come."

Thousands of additional U.S. Army troops were deployed to the reservation. On December 15, 1890, Sitting Bull was arrested for failing to stop his people from practicing the Ghost Dance. During his arrest, one of Sitting Bull's men, Catch the Bear, fired at Lieutenant "Bull Head", striking his right side. He instantly wheeled and shot Sitting Bull, hitting him in the left side, and both men subsequently died.

The Hunkpapa who lived in Sitting Bull's camp and relatives fled to the south. They joined the Big Foot Band in Cherry Creek, South Dakota, before traveling to the Pine Ridge Reservation to meet with Chief Red Cloud. The 7th Cavalry caught them at a place called Wounded Knee on December 29, 1890. The 7th Cavalry, claiming they were trying to disarm the Lakota people, killed 300 people, including women and children at Wounded Knee.

== Governance and districts ==
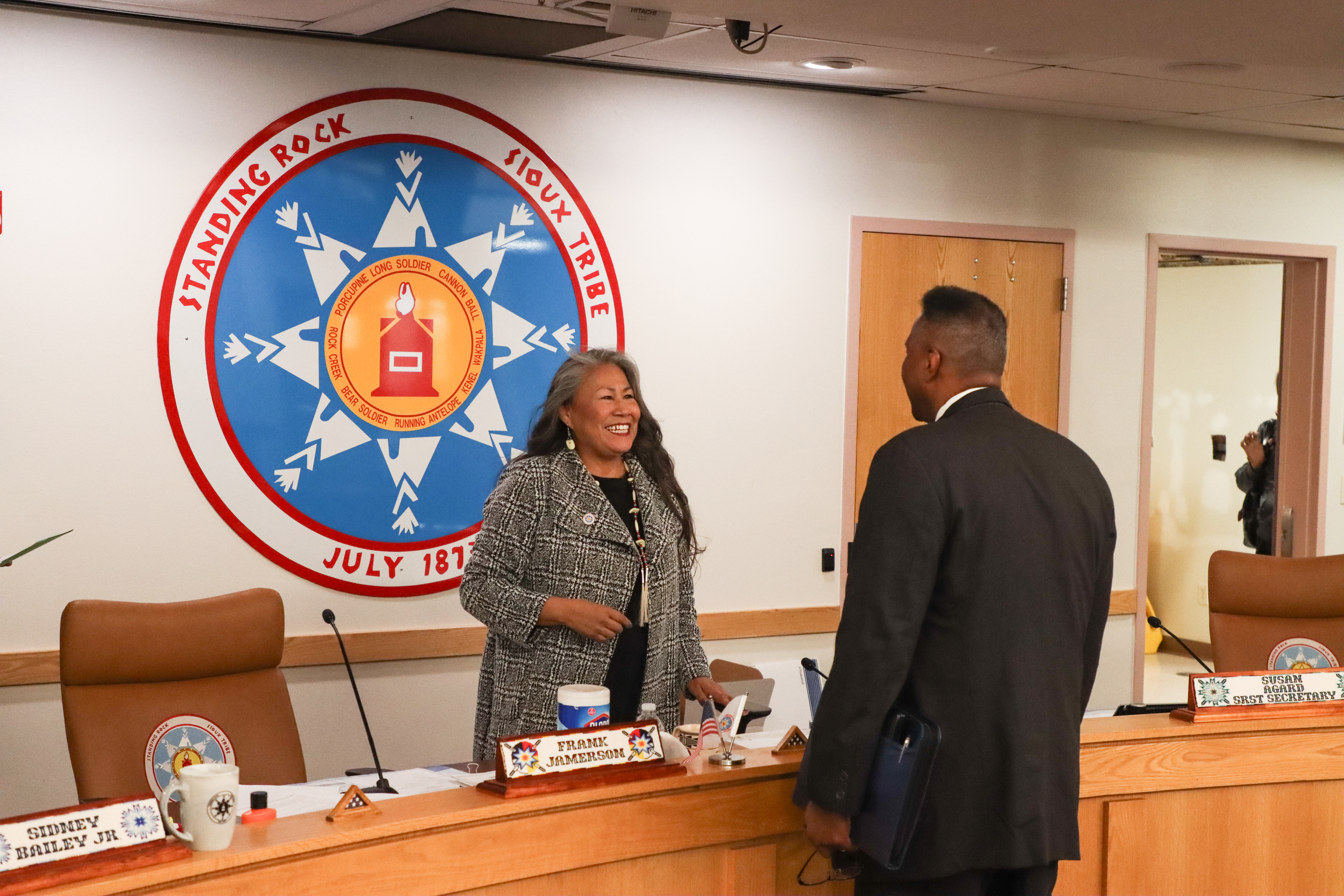
Chairwoman Janet Alkire speaks to Under Secretary of Agriculture for Rural Development Basil Gooden in 2024.

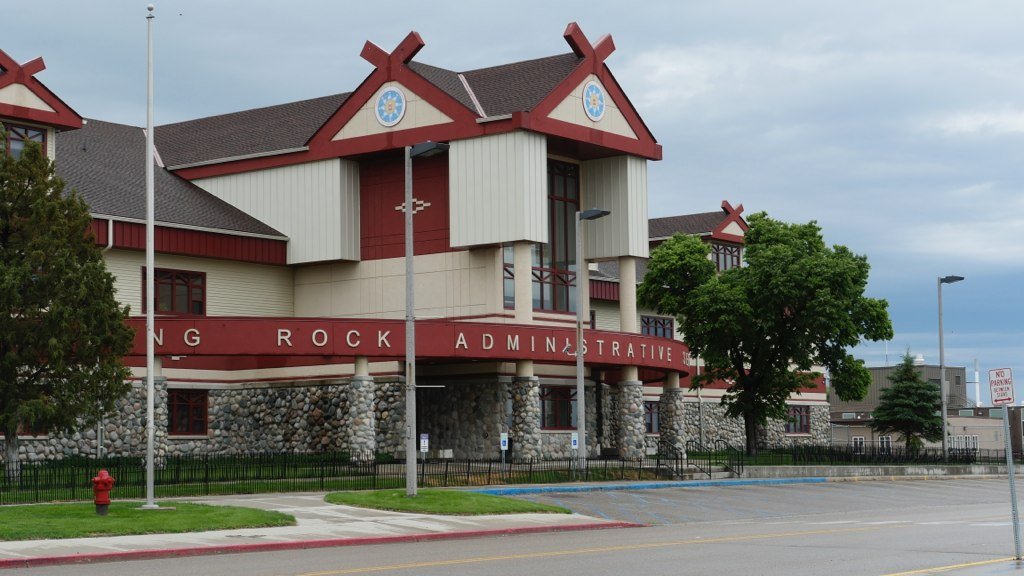
Standing Rock Administrative Service building, Fort Yates

According to its constitution, The Standing Rock Sioux Tribe of North & South Dakota, a federally recognized tribe, is governed by an elected 17-member Tribal Council, including the Tribal Chairman, Vice Chairman, Secretary, and 14 representatives. As of 2022, the current chair is Janet Alkire.

They serve terms of four years, with elections providing for staggered replacement of members. Six members are elected at-large and eight from the regional single-member districts:

- Fort Yates (Long Soldier)
- Porcupine
- Kenel
- Wakpala
- Running Antelope (Little Eagle)
- Bear Soldier (McLaughlin)
- Rock Creek (Bullhead)
- Cannonball

== Environmental issues ==
In the 1960s, the Army Corps of Engineers and the Bureau of Reclamation built five large dams on the Missouri River, and implemented the Pick–Sloan Missouri Basin Program, forcing Native Americans to relocate from large areas to be flooded behind the dams. These dams were for flood control and hydroelectric power generation in the region. More than 200,000 acres (810 km^{2}) on the Standing Rock Reservation and the Cheyenne River Reservation in South Dakota were flooded by the Oahe Dam alone.

As of 2015, poverty remains a problem for the displaced populations in the Dakotas. They have sought compensation for their towns submerged under Lake Oahe and the loss of traditional ways of life.

== Dakota Access Pipeline ==
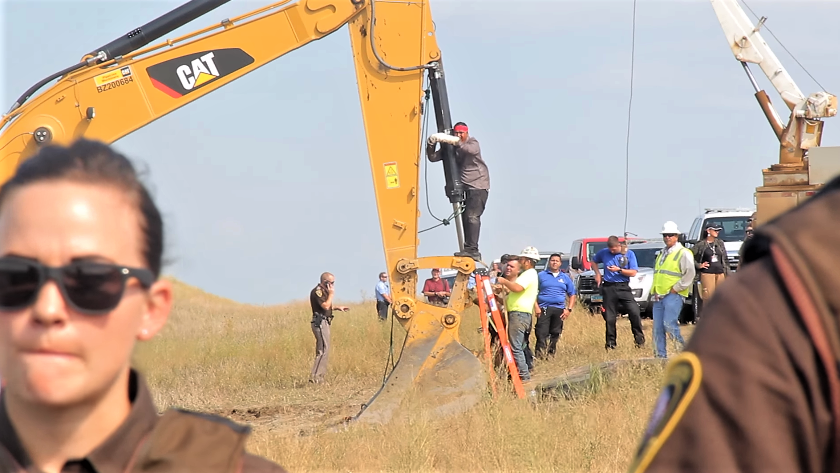
Lakota man locks himself to construction equipment to stop progress of the Dakota Access Pipeline near the Standing Rock Reservation in North Dakota, Summer 2016

The Dakota Access Pipeline (DAPL) was rerouted near the Standing Rock Sioux Reservation after a proposed route near the state capital Bismarck was denied as being deemed too risky for Bismarck's water supplies. The tribe opposed the pipeline to be constructed under Lake Oahe and the Missouri River.

On April 1, 2016, LaDonna Brave Bull Allard, an elder member of the Standing Rock Sioux tribe, and her grandchildren established the Sacred Stone Camp to protest the DAPL, which they said threatens the upper Missouri River, the only water supply for the Standing Rock Reservation. The camp was on Allard's private land and served as a center for cultural preservation and spiritual resistance to the DAPL. Protests at the pipeline site in North Dakota began in the spring of 2016 and drew Indigenous people from throughout North America, as well as many other supporters. It was the largest gathering of Native Tribes in the past 100 years. A number of planned arrests occurred when people locked themselves to heavy machinery in acts of civil disobedience.

The Standing Rock Sioux Tribe filed an injunction against the U.S. Army Corps of Engineers to stop building the pipeline. In April 2016, three federal agencies -- U.S. Environmental Protection Agency, U.S. Department of Interior, and Advisory Council on Historic Preservation—requested a full Environmental Impact Statement of the pipeline. In August 2016, protests were held near Cannon Ball, North Dakota.

In the summer of 2016, a group of young activists from Standing Rock ran from North Dakota to Washington, D.C., to present a petition in protest of the construction of the Dakota Access Pipeline, which is part of the Bakken pipeline. They launched an international campaign called ReZpect our Water. The activists argued that the pipeline, which goes from North Dakota to Illinois, would jeopardize the water source of the reservation, the Missouri River.

By late September, it was reported that there were over 300 federally recognized Native American tribes and an estimated 3,000 to 4,000 pipeline resistance supporters residing in the camp, with several thousand more on weekends.

A number of planned arrests occurred when people locked themselves to heavy machinery. On September 3, 2016, the DAPL brought in a private security firm. The company used bulldozers to dig up part of the pipeline route that was subject to a pending injunction motion; it contained possible Native graves and burial artifacts. The bulldozers arrived within a day from when the tribe filed legal action. When unarmed protesters moved near the bulldozers, the guards used pepper spray and guard dogs to attack the protesters. At least six protesters were treated for dog bites, and an estimated 30 protesters were pepper-sprayed before the security guards and their dogs exited the scene in trucks.

The pipeline construction company claimed they hired the security company because the protests had not been peaceful. The Morton County Sheriff, Kyle Kirchmeier, described the September 3, 2016, protest, saying protesters crossed onto private property and attacked security guards with "wooden posts and flag poles." He said, "Any suggestion that today's event was a peaceful protest, is false."

Shortly thereafter, on September 7, 2016, after the federal court denied the tribe's request for an injunction, the United States Environmental Protection Agency (EPA), the United States Department of the Interior (DOI) and the Advisory Council on Historic Preservation gave the order to halt the construction of the pipeline until further environmental assessments had taken place. There was no evidence of what role President Obama himself may or may not have played in this decision.

Dakota Access agreed to temporarily halt construction in parts of North Dakota, until September 9, to help "keep the peace." When a federal judge denied the injunction sought by the tribe on the 9th, the Department of the Interior, Department of Justice, and the Department of the Army (which oversees the Corps of Engineers) stepped in, halting construction of the pipeline around Lake Oahe, 20 miles (32 km) either side of the Lake, but not halting the project altogether.

On the weekend of December 2, 2016, approximately 2000 United States military veterans arrived in North Dakota in support of the activists. The veterans pledged to form a human shield to protect the protesters from police.

In January 2017, an executive order was issued by President Donald Trump to streamline the approval to construct the pipeline, on the basis of creating more jobs. The order provoked a new wave of protests and response from leaders of the Sioux tribe.

On February 3, 2017, the Army Corps of Engineers announced that it would close lands where protesters were camped near Lake Oahe by February 22, 2017. Over 4,000 U.S. veterans under the name Veterans Stand were camped at Standing Rock along with hundreds of protesters as well as the members of the Sioux Tribe. The veterans vowed to oppose the pipeline and protect the land of the American Indians and the water of the United States. Since August 2016, the total number of protesters arrested had surpassed 700, and on February 3, 2017, 39-year-old American Indian activist Chase Iron Eyes and more than 70 peaceably assembled protesters were arrested in a police raid ordered by the Trump administration, on charges of "inciting a riot" which is considered a felony and carries up to 5 years in prison. At that time more than 9.2 million Americans had signed a petition against DAPL.

On February 7, 2017, the Trump administration authorized the Army Corps of Engineers to proceed, ending its environmental impact assessment and the associated public comment period.[12] The pipeline was completed by April and its first oil was delivered on May 14, 2017.[13]

The tribe sued and in March 2020 a federal judge sided with them and ordered USACE to do a full environmental impact statement. In a 42-page decision Judge James Boasberg said the environmental analysis by both the companies behind the pipeline and the Corps was severely lacking. "In projects of this scope, it is not difficult for an opponent to find fault with many conclusions made by an operator and relied on by the agency, but here, there is considerably more than a few isolated comments raising insubstantial concerns. The many commenters in this case pointed to serious gaps in crucial parts of the Corps' analysis — to name a few, that the pipeline's leak-detection system was unlikely to work, that it was not designed to catch slow spills, that the operator's serious history of incidents had not been taken into account, and that the worst-case scenario used by the Corps was potentially only a fraction of what a realistic figure would be." The case will continue, but in the meantime the pipeline is fully operational.

=== Media attention and public awareness ===
A video was aired on June 22, 2017, showing how people were treated as part of the pipeline protest in September 2016, which included evidence of Dakota Access guard dogs with bloody mouths after attacking protesters. Democracy Now! journalist Amy Goodman filmed the incident, which she published in support of opposition to the pipeline. Following the publishing of her video, North Dakota Police issued an arrest warrant for Goodman under accusations of Criminal Trespass. Goodman responded, "This is an unacceptable violation of freedom of the press..."

The 2016 Democratic and Republican presidential candidates Hillary Clinton and Donald Trump made no comments during the campaign regarding the DAPL. 2016 Green Party presidential candidate Jill Stein protested at the site, including spray painting equipment; charges of criminal trespass and criminal mischief were made against both her and her running mate Ajamu Baraka. US Senator Bernie Sanders from Vermont, a 2016 Democratic presidential primary candidate, publicly spoke out against the pipeline and in favor of the "water protectors." A variety of Hollywood celebrities also supported the protests.

On September 20, 2016, Standing Rock Chairman Dave Archambault II addressed the Human Rights Council of the United Nations in Geneva, testifying about the United States' violation of treaties with regard to this project.

Two days later Energy Transfer Partners purchased the property where protests were being staged, from David and Brenda Meyer of Flasher, North Dakota. Analysts believed the company was trying to deter further protests. The Standing Rock Nation said that the Meyers had permitted activists on their land.

== Presidential visit ==
In June 2014, President Barack Obama, accompanied by First Lady Michelle Obama, made his first visit to a Native American reservation during the annual Cannon Ball Flag Day Celebration at Standing Rock. This was one of the few visits by a sitting American President to any Native American reservation. Some reservation residents felt that their specific concerns about treaty issues and government appropriations were not addressed.

== Notable tribal members ==
- David Archambault II, Tribal Chairman, 2013–2017
- Eagle Woman (1820–1888), peace activist, trader and diplomat
- Sitting Bull, Hunkpapa Lakota leader
- Josephine Gates Kelly (1888–1976), Tribal Chairman, 1946–1951
- Beverly Little Thunder (1947–2025), activist
- Beatrice Medicine (1923–2005), scholar, anthropologist and educator
- Tiffany Midge, poet, editor and author
- Patricia Locke (1928–2001), Lakota educator and advocate of Native American language preservation
- Vine Deloria, Jr. (1933–2005), activist and essayist
- Barbara May Cameron (1954–2002), was a Hunkpapa Lakota photographer, poet, writer, and human rights activist in the fields of lesbian/gay rights, women's rights and Native American rights.
- Tomi Kay Phillips, academic administrator and president of Sitting Bull College
- Susan Power (b. 1961), novelist
- Laurel Vermillion, academic administrator and president of Sitting Bull College
- Kyrie Irving (b. 1992), basketball player
- Danielle SeeWalker, artist and activist

== See also ==
- Cedar River National Grassland
- Gertrude McDermott
- Prairie Knights Casino and Resort, a tribe-operated casino on the Standing Rock Sioux reservation
