= Jasilyn Charger =

Native American and LGBTQ activist

- Born: May 20, 1996 (age 30); Rapid City, South Dakota, USA
- Occupations: land activist, water protector, community organizer, and advocate for Native American and LGBTQ rights

Jasilyn Charger (born May 20, 1996) is a land activist, water protector, community organizer, and advocate for Native American and LGBTQ rights, and a youth founder of the Dakota Access Pipeline protests. Charger is a member of the Cheyenne River Sioux Tribe and is from Eagle Butte, South Dakota, USA. They have also protested against the Keystone Pipeline, and were arrested for their non-violent civil disobedience in November 2020.

Charger co-founded the One Mind Youth Movement, International Indigenous Youth Council, and Seventh Defenders. They are a part of the Warrior Women Project.

== Early life ==
Charger was born and raised on the Cheyenne River Indian Reservation, in South Dakota, USA. They learned about activism from relatives who opposed a uranium mine, and learned indigenous traditions from their mother. Their father died two months before they were born. Charger has 15 half-siblings, and one full sibling, their twin sister Jasilea Charger. Their paternal grandfather, Harry Charger, was chief of the Itazipco band.

Charger has said that their mother cared very little for Jasilyn and their siblings as she "paid the bills and drank." Charger was, however, able to find support through their twin sister. After their mother called Child Protection Services claiming Charger had run away, they were taken to a group home while their twin sister was sent to another group home on the opposite side of the state.

In 2009, the Department of Social Services placed 13-year-old Charger in mental health facilities after they had spent years in foster care homes. They did not see their family again until they turned 18 and got released from the system.

Charger returned home in 2014 with little connection to their family and no home to stay. Many suicides, murders and funerals took place in their community that year, and addiction and violence were prevalent among youth. Charger was homeless and despondent until they were helped by Chief David Bald Eagle who took them into his home. After a friend's suicide in 2015 and another suicide soon after, Charger and two friends founded the One Mind Youth Movement, which encouraged young people to care for each other. They believed these suicides were happening as a result of poverty and drug abuse within Cheyenne families. Charger believed that a safe space and activism would teach children survival skills to avoid bullying and drug abuse, and provide protection if home was not a safe space.

== Activism ==
=== Racial and climate justice ===
In November 2015, Charger and other members of the One Minded Youth Movement attended the Our Generation, Our Choice rally in Washington, D.C. to demand that politicians address racial, immigration and climate justice. Charger delivered a speech: "We're tired, we've had enough," they said. "The murders, the suicides – we're losing our future, but we're here to make a change." Charger and the other members of the One Minded Youth Movement focused on threats being posed to Native communities and specifically Native American youth. The group used the Our Generation, Our Choice rally to advocate for the wellbeing of tribal youth.

=== Dakota Access Pipeline ===
In April 2016, Charger, the One Mind Youth Movement and some experienced Keystone Pipeline activists established Sacred Stone Camp, the first small prayer camp in Cannon Ball, North Dakota, on the Standing Rock Sioux Reservation. Ladonna Brave-Bull Allard, who made space for the camp on their land, gave a speech that inspired Charger. This camp was a first step to block construction of the pipeline. The Dakota Access Pipeline would move large quantities of oil under the Missouri River, posing a threat to the main source of drinking water for the Stand Rock Sioux.

The prayer camp served as more than just a means to protest the Pipeline. At the Sacred Stone Camp in Standing Rock, the youths were in a safe space where they would learn skills to help them overcome trauma. Charger said, "we don't want our children to inherit this depression." The members of the Sacred Stone Camp (now calling themselves International Indigenous Youth Council), co-founded by Charger, was the first family-like experience for many of the kids. Groups like the Indigenous Environmental Network (I.E.N.) provided support to the activists at Standing Rock. The I.E.N. paid for Charger to go to Washington to be trained as an organizer. "Who better to speak for the past than the voice of the future?" said Charger.

In July and August 2016, 30 activists, including Charger and their twin sister Jasilea, participated in a 2,000-mile relay race from Sacred Stone Camp to Washington, D.C. to bring attention to the protests and deliver a petition with more than 140,000 signatures against the pipeline. The run was organized by ReZpect Our Water and Octei Sakowin Youth and allies. The relay style of running to deliver an important message is a Native American custom. The runners pass the message like the baton in a relay race to deliver it as quickly as possible. About 40 runners completed the entire distance. Divergent actress and activist Shailene Woodley participated in the relay. The petition, on Change.org, eventually acquired 559,237 signatures.

The group ran for 22 days, arriving on August 5 and were allowed to meet with the Army Corps of Engineers, the Bureau of Indian Affairs, and a two-star general. The Dakota Access Pipeline received international attention.

"I run for every man, woman and child that was, that is, and for those who will come to be... I run for my life, because I want to live. ... It's a system designed to let things slip through the cracks, but it's up to us to hold our government accountable. Our land is in danger, as well as our identity, but we will not stand in silence ... We are rising from this dilemma and uniting nations that have been separate for generations. We must take advantage of this chance to make a change," said Charger. In an interview with Democracy Now! they stated: "If the youth can ... work with other youth from different places and not know them personally and do this run ….and stand together in this fight, the elders, the adults, can do that, too"

In September 2016, Chief Arvol Looking Horse gave the youths a chanupa, a sacred ceremonial pipe that is a symbol of interwoven human community and nature, ancestors and living. Most importantly, the council declared the youth to be akicita, a Lakota term meaning something similar to "warriors for the people".

In December 2016, the pipeline's needed easement was denied by the Army Corps of Engineers. David Archambault II, the chairman of the Standing Rock tribal government, thanked the runners for their activism. "When the youth ran to D.C., that's when this really got started."

=== Return to Eagle Butte ===
When Standing Rock disbanded in early 2017, Charger returned to Eagle Butte, couch-surfing with friends. They were pregnant but miscarried their son, and became depressed and suicidal. Their son's death and burial reinforced their determination to protect the earth. They then decided to engage in suicide prevention work and organize against the Keystone Pipeline.

=== Roots Camp and more Keystone Pipeline protests ===
Charger and other tribal members formed Roots Camp, a small protest camp on the Cheyenne River Indian Reservation. The camp members intend to stay put until all infrastructure related to the Keystone Pipeline is removed from an area of land near the reservation that belongs by treaty to the Lakota people but was seized by settlers and the federal government.

Charger locked themself to a pump station in November 2020. They were charged with trespassing, a class 1 misdemeanor. and faced up to a year in prison for an act of non-violent civil disobedience. Represented by the Lakota People's Law Project, Charger pled no contest and agreed to six months probation and $518 in fines, in exchange for no jail time.

In December 2020, Charger was a featured speaker in the Indigenous Womxn Fighting Pipelines webinar, presented by the Indigenous Environmental Network.

The Keystone Pipeline was officially cancelled on June 9, 2021.

== Recognition ==
Teen Vogue’s Water Warriors - April 2017

MIT News MIT Media Lab’s Disobedience Award - Honorable Mention - July 2017

How Stuff Works (History): Five times young people changed the world - 2018

The Guardian: The Frederick Douglass 200 - February 2019

Rolling Stone: Children of the Climate Crisis - March 2020

Ms. Magazine Book Review: How we go home - a collection of twelve oral histories by Indigenous people from across Canada and the United States. - Nov 2020

== Personal life ==
Charger is non-binary and uses they/them pronouns. They are two-spirit and bisexual.

== See also ==
- Dakota Access Pipeline protests
- Dakota Access Pipeline protests § Indigenous youth groups
- Keystone Pipeline § Protests and opposition
