= Ruby Montoya =

American climate activist

Ruby Montoya is an American former teacher and climate activist from Arizona known for her involvement with Jessica Reznicek in actions targeting the Dakota Access Pipeline.

In 2022, Montoya was sentenced to six years in federal custody for conspiracy to damage an energy facility.

== Background and career ==
Montoya was born in 1990 and raised in Phoenix, Arizona. She studied at Arizona State University and later earned a master's degree in management and cultural studies from the Universidad de Granada in Spain. Before becoming publicly known for her involvement in the global opposition to the Dakota Access Pipeline, she worked as a preschool teacher in Boulder, Colorado. She later taught elementary school in rural Arizona.

== Dakota Access Pipeline activism ==
Montoya became involved in protests against the Dakota Access Pipeline in 2016. Reporting by Julia Shipley described Montoya as having followed the pipeline controversy before joining protest activity connected to the Mississippi Stand encampment in Iowa. Demonstrators at the encampment sought to stop construction through tactics including blockades and attaching themselves to construction equipment.

According to federal prosecutors, Montoya and Reznicek participated in a series of actions targeting Dakota Access Pipeline construction equipment and materials between 2016 and 2017. The actions included fires set at construction sites and damage to pipeline-related equipment.

In July 2017, Montoya and Reznicek publicly acknowledged responsibility for property destruction against the pipeline. They were not immediately arrested; federal charges were filed two years later, and she was arrested while working as an elementary school teacher in Arizona on September 27, 2019.

Montoya later pleaded guilty to conspiracy to damage an energy facility and, in September 2022, was sentenced to six years in federal prison. At sentencing, the district court applied the terrorism enhancement under the United States Sentencing Guidelines. The enhancement's application in the case drew criticism from civil liberties advocates and members of Congress, including U.S. Senator Ed Markey, who argued that its use represented an overbroad application of the guideline.

== See also ==
- Dakota Access Pipeline protests
- Jessica Reznicek
- Climate movement
