= Jessica Reznicek =

Catholic Worker Movement and climate activist (born 1981)

- Born: July 25, 1981 (age 45)
- Citizenship: United States
- Education: Simpson College
- Known for: Environmental activism
- Movement: Dakota Access Pipeline protests

Jessica Rae Reznicek (born July 25, 1981) is a Catholic Worker and climate activist from Iowa. On June 29, 2021, she was sentenced to eight years in federal prison for a series of attacks on the Dakota Access Pipeline.

== Early life ==
Reznicek grew up in Adel, then Perry, Iowa. She was raised Catholic, but was not a regular churchgoer after her childhood, leaving the faith as a teenager. Her father worked for the sheriff's department. After high school, she drove a fork lift at a Hy-Vee distribution center and took a job at a country club. It was there that she met her future husband, whom she described as a "millionaire businessman." By her mid-20s, she was married to this pharmacist in the Des Moines area and was studying political science at Simpson College.

== Activism ==
=== Early activism ===
Her activism began with a trip to Colorado in the mid-2000s where she observed earth dug up by an oil-and-gas industry project, deciding to make and post protest signs in front of the operation. In 2011, Reznicek joined the Occupy Wall Street movement. She returned to Iowa three weeks later after learning about the satellite protest in Des Moines. At the Des Moines Occupy protest, she met members of the Catholic Worker movement and was attracted to their social justice mission. After the Occupy protests, Reznicek moved into the Rachel Corrie House, one of four Catholic Worker houses in Des Moines. During this time Reznicek wrote for Via Pacis, the local Catholic Worker newsletter, and described her journey from a financially secure housewife and college student to finding her spiritual purpose as a Catholic worker and activist.

In the fall of 2015, Reznicek used a $1,000 grant to conduct research into defense contractors near Omaha. When she learned that Northrop Grumman was developing the RQ-4 Global Hawk drone, she abandoned plans to leave the United States and focus on her spiritual life. Instead, she visited the facility on the Feast of the Holy Innocents, introduced herself to the guard on duty, and then smashed a window and a door with a sledgehammer. When finished, she kneeled on the sidewalk to await her arrest. She served a 72-day prison sentence.

By the time she committed her first arson in November 2016, she had been a part of the Catholic worker movement, the Plowshares movement, and other Catholic-activist movements for more than a decade. She participated in protests around the world, and was deported from Israel after helping Palestinians plant olive trees in occupied lands.

=== Dakota Access Pipeline, arrest and conviction ===
Reznicek opposed the Dakota Access Pipeline and in the spring of 2016 she began walking and hitchhiking to the Standing Rock Sioux Reservation to join in the protests against it. Her involvement included locking herself to the construction equipment used to excavate the pipeline route. In the process of her protest, she was arrested several times. In August 2016, Reznicek blockaded a road construction workers were using to bore a hole underneath the Mississippi River. She was arrested later that day and spent the night in jail. After being released, she blocked the road again and spent another night in jail. On the third day, she set up camp on adjoining land where others joined her in the following weeks.

In November 2016, Reznicek and fellow activist and Catholic Worker Ruby Montoya burned a section of the pipeline at a worksite outside of Newell, Iowa, punching holes in coffee cans, filling them with motor oil, and placing them inside cabs of machinery after being lit. Reznicek and Montoya held a press conference in July 2017, in which they announced they had sabotaged the pipeline over a number of years. Between March and May 2017, Reznicek used oxyacetylene cutting torches and gasoline-soaked rags to damage or destroy other sections of the pipeline around Iowa and South Dakota. It is estimated that their actions cost $6 million in damage by stopping 30 million barrels of oil.

Reznicek was indicted by a grand jury in 2019 on nine federal criminal charges, including setting 11 fires. After her indictment, she expressed regret that she did not do more to try and stop the pipeline. She accepted a plea deal where she pled guilty to a single count of damaging an energy facility. She was sentenced to eight years in federal prison and ordered to pay $3.2 million in restitution.
