= Carl J. Artman =

American politician

Carl Artman
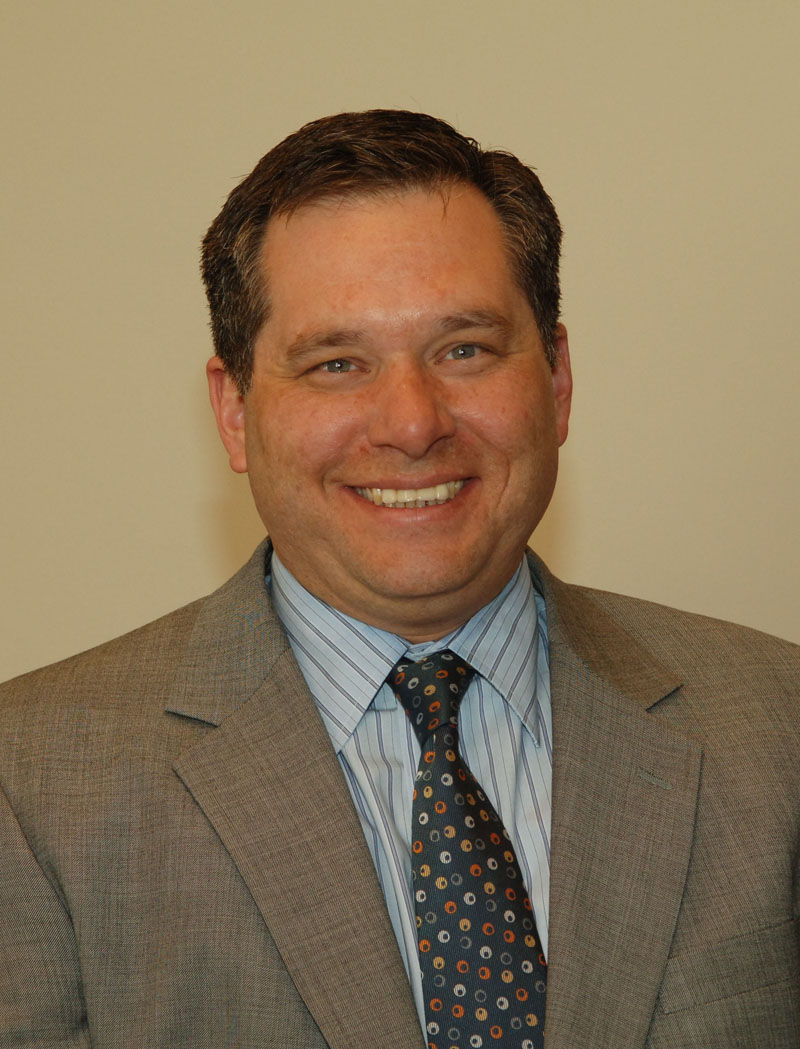
- Official portrait of Carl J. Artman.

10th Assistant Secretary of the Interior for Indian Affairs
- In office March 5, 2007 – May 23, 2008
- President: George W. Bush
- Preceded by: Dave Anderson
- Succeeded by: Larry Echo Hawk

Personal details
- Born: Carl Joseph Artman, III; March 15, 1965 (age 61) Des Moines, Iowa
- Education: Columbia College of Missouri (B.A.); University of Wisconsin-Madison (M.B.A.); Washington University in St. Louis (J.D.); University of Denver (L.L.M.)

Carl Joseph Artman, III (born March 15, 1965) is an Oneida government official who served as the United States Assistant Secretary of the Interior for Indian Affairs with jurisdiction over the Office of Indian Affairs, Bureau of Indian Affairs and the Bureau of Indian Education from 2007 to 2008, and he served as the associate solicitor for Indian affairs at the Department of the Interior from 2005 to 2007.

== Early life and education ==
He received a B.A. from Columbia College in Columbia, Missouri, an M.B.A. from the Wisconsin School of Business, J.D. from the Washington University School of Law, and an L.L.M. from Sturm College of Law.

== Career ==
Artman was nominated to the position on August 2, 2006 and confirmed by the Senate on March 5, 2007. Artman resigned from the position on May 23, 2008.

He is a citizen of the Oneida Nation based in Wisconsin. Artman is professor at Arizona State University College of Law and Director of its Tribal Economic Development Program. As of Artman also serves as an advisory board member for the Native American Venture Fund, an impact investment fund to create economic sustainability for Federally Recognized Tribes.
