= TigerSwan =

Private security firm based in North Carolina, USA

- Type: Private
- Industry: Security
- Founded: 2008
- Founder: James Reese
- Headquarters: Apex, North Carolina, United States
- Area served: Worldwide

TigerSwan is an international security and global stability firm founded in 2008 by retired U.S. Army lieutenant colonel and Delta Force operator James Reese.

== Background ==
TigerSwan is a Service-Disabled Veteran-Owned Small Business based in Apex, North Carolina. The company operates globally. Founder James Reese served in the elite Delta Force unit. He started his career as an ROTC cadet and served in the United States Army for 25 years. Reese was an adviser, commander, and operations officer during the invasions of Afghanistan and Iraq.

The company has over 300 employees and conducts operations in over 50 countries.

The TigerSwan firearms training center was located near Cedar Creek in Cumberland County, North Carolina. Since it opened in 2010, the range has offered firearms and tactical training to military, law enforcement, and the public. In 2014, Reese sold the training company, and the shooting range changed its name to the Range Complex.

== Company history ==
=== Iraq War ===
The firm provided security for the Iraqi Mine-Unexploded Ordnance Clearing Organization, a U.S. State Department funded NGO tasked with clearing munitions and mines in Iraq.

=== 2014 Sochi Olympics ===
During the 2014 Sochi Olympics, TigerSwan provided security for members of Olympic committees, corporate sponsors, and sports fans traveling to Sochi. They said they could pinpoint a client's location within a 3 foot radius using a GPS device provided to their clients.

=== Standing Rock protests ===
TigerSwan was hired by Dakota Access, LLC to provide security consulting during the Dakota Access Pipeline protests. Internal company documents, which were leaked to The Intercept, reportedly compared the movement opposed to the pipeline with jihadis, calling them "an ideologically driven insurgency with a strong religious component." The Intercept called the DAPL operation a "multi-faceted private security operation characterized by sweeping and invasive surveillance of protesters," and reported that the leaked situation and disinformation reports prepared by the company during the protest provide evidence of aerial surveillance, as well as radio eavesdropping. Further revelations emerged from The Intercept leak including: TigerSwan had protesters followed, TigerSwan targeted protesters of Middle-Eastern descent, TigerSwan placed infiltrators at the camps and TigerSwan posted fake social media posts opposing the pipeline.

Lower Brulé Sioux Historian Nick Estes has argued that TigerSwan took part in anti-black racism during situation report briefings with local law enforcement carried out through aerial photography of Water Protector camps at Standing Rock: "In one situation report, an image of a gorilla is superimposed atop the camp. This was Harambe, the gorilla killed at the Cincinnati Zoo when a Black child fell into his cage. On one hand, white supremacists have used the killing of Harambe to mock Black people online, charging that the gorilla had to be killed because Black parents are careless. On the other, the comparison of Black people to monkeys and gorillas is a well-established racist trope. Now, TigerSwan was evoking this anti-Black history to racialize, mock, and degrade Water Protectors with tropes of primitivism. To DAPL and law enforcement, the camps were a place of death, a place to be destroyed, a place that threatened to expose the illegitimacy of settlement."

TigerSwan is currently being sued by North Dakota’s Private Investigative and Security Board for operating without a license in the state in 2016 and 2017, during which time TigerSwan was working for Dakota Access, LLC. TigerSwan denies the charges.

== Legal ==
In 2013, TigerSwan filed a lawsuit against the United States in Federal Court alleging breach of contract due to improper termination. The dispute was over two contracts that were awarded by the Department of Defense for Iraq-based security services. The DoD initially awarded the contracts to TigerSwan, but then terminated the contracts and awarded them instead to the British private military company Aegis Defence Services. The Court denied the government's request to dismiss the case, finding that a contractor does not always need to show specific intent in order to prevail on a claim that alleges bad faith.
