= Native American Venture Fund =

The Native American Venture Fund (NAVF) is a for-profit impact investment fund that partners with Native American Tribal Corporations to leverage the tribe's economic and legal advantages in order to develop successful tribal business enterprises. These legal advantages are defined as Tribal Sovereignty which are based upon existing laws and treaties to ensure that U.S. state governments and the U.S. federal government live up to their legal obligations to the Native American Tribal Nations. NAVF's vision is to help all tribal nations become economically self-sufficient by providing access to business opportunities, capital, training and mentor-ship.

== NAVF purpose / inspiration ==
Native American Nations have been in a constant battle to maintain their sovereign rights to protect their lands, distinct culture, society and even way of life. With media headlines focused on a small percentage of tribes succeeding in their casino operations, such as the Seminole Tribe of Florida's potential $3B state-tribal gaming compact, the Native American mascot controversy or Hollywood's portrayal of mafia like, corruption of a tribal business operated by the fictional Ugaya Tribe in an episode of House of Cards, there has been huge misconception in the portrayal of Native American Nations as a powerful, diverse and sustainable conglomerate, given, the reality could not be further from the truth. Taking a closer look, a crisis within Native America is ever mounting, from high school dropout rates (33%), extreme reservation poverty (25%) drug addiction (39%), lack of healthcare access (42%), compounded by a lack of economic opportunities has led to mortality rates by Alcoholism and Diabetes 220% and 220%, respectively, above the national average. Sadly, this has led to an average life expectancy in some US regions of Native American's are as low as 49 years of age, according to recent US Census and CDC data. These systemic issues facing Native America will not be solved by the politicians, non-profits, philanthropic endeavors or governmental agencies which affect 567 Federally Recognized Tribes to include 229 Ingenious Alaskan Tribal Communities. To combat the long-term issue of Native American Tribal sustainability, the only real solution can come from connecting the dots between leveraging tribal sovereignty, corporate America, investment capital, industry leadership, and education, with a sustainable outlook measured in generations, not by fiscal quarters.

== NAVF formation ==
Native American Venture Fund, LLC was co-founded on April 13, 2015, and was formed as a Delaware Series, limited liability Company. Native American Venture Fund, LLC was formed as a Series, Delaware limited liability Company on April 13, 2015. The Manager of the Fund is Native American Partners, Inc., a Delaware corporation. The Fund filed its Form D registration with the Securities and Exchange Commission on July 30, 2015, under Federal Exemption Rule 506c as a pooled investment - venture capital fund.

== NAVF fund portfolio ==
Native American Enterprise Fund – Invests into mid to late stage businesses in E-commerce / Data centers, Fintech, Renewable Energy and Government Contracting.

Native American Venture Fund Carbon – NAVF partners with both tribes and investors to combat one of the most significant threats facing the world today, Climate Change. The main cause, is the Greenhouse gases that are released from Fossil Fuel Use (Industry, energy production, automotive), deforestation, and intensive livestock farming. As concentrations of these gases increase, more warming occurs than would happen naturally, because greenhouse effetely traps radiation from the sun and warms the planet's surface. Simply put, forest conservation creates a "Carbon Offset", which equates to the removal of a metric ton of carbon dioxide equivalent. For every ton of Carbon captured through a Carbon Offset Program, a qualified "Carbon Credit / Carbon Offset" is created. Companies such as British Petroleum (BP), Google, Chevron, FedEx and several hundred US companies purchase carbon credits at established market prices, in some cases to avoid environmental penalties that cost well in excess of the carbon credit. Thus, NAVF provides financing and project management for North American indigenous tribes, given that the total land holdings of this minority is in excess of 3% of the entire landmass of the continent. The NET outcome, according to the Fund is profitable environmental protection for the Tribe and the investment community.

== NAVF capital raise / invested to date ==
According to Edgar, the Fund can raise up to $100,000,000, with individual investment minimums at $250,000. The Fund declined to revel names of investors or amount raised in their current Securities Disclosures.

== NAVF Advisory Board ==
NAVF's vision is molded through its three advisory boards with each board having up to 10 seats. The NAVF boards are as follows: 1) Tribal Board – composed of Native Americans from different tribes throughout the country with a variety of expertise in Indian matters in social-economic development, 2) Industry Board – composed of corporate leadership that matches specific business ventures to tribes, and 3) Governance Board – composed of thought leadership in sovereign law, tax matter, legislation and have/hold influential roles in government that relates to the tribal / economic endeavors of the fund. Combined, these advisory board expands NAVF's vision, while understanding tribal culture, mindset, overcoming legislative and legal hurdles to promote a sustainable future for Native America. hurdles perspective to the legal and academic expertise.

A notable members of NAVF's Tribal / Advisory Board include:

Carl J. Artman who served as the United States Assistant Secretary of the Interior for Indian Affairs with jurisdiction over the Office of Indian Affairs, Bureau of Indian Affairs and the Bureau of Indian Education from 2007 to 2008, and he served as the Associate Solicitor for Indian Affairs at the Department of the Interior from 2005 to 2007.

Ms. Lynn Dee Rapp, an enrolled member of the Oglala Sioux Tribe, current Director of the American Indian College Fund, a former longtime investment banker with Morgan Stanley and former chairperson of the National Congress of American Indian's Finance and Investment Committee has joined NAVF's advisory board in 2017.

Chairman David Archambault II, former chairman of Standing Rock Sioux Tribe in North Dakota, recognized for leading the opposition against the construction of Dakota Access Pipeline in 2016, has joined the advisory board of NAVF in 2018.

Rear Admiral Robert P. Wright Retired, former commander or the Space & Network Warfare Program (SNWP) assuming command at Naval Space Command and U.S. Space Command. As a U.S. Space Command liaison officer (LNO), he served in every regional theater and covered the active duty Space LNO position at U.S. Southern Command for the last 14 months of his assignment. Admiral Wright joined NAVF in 2017.
