= NODAPL =

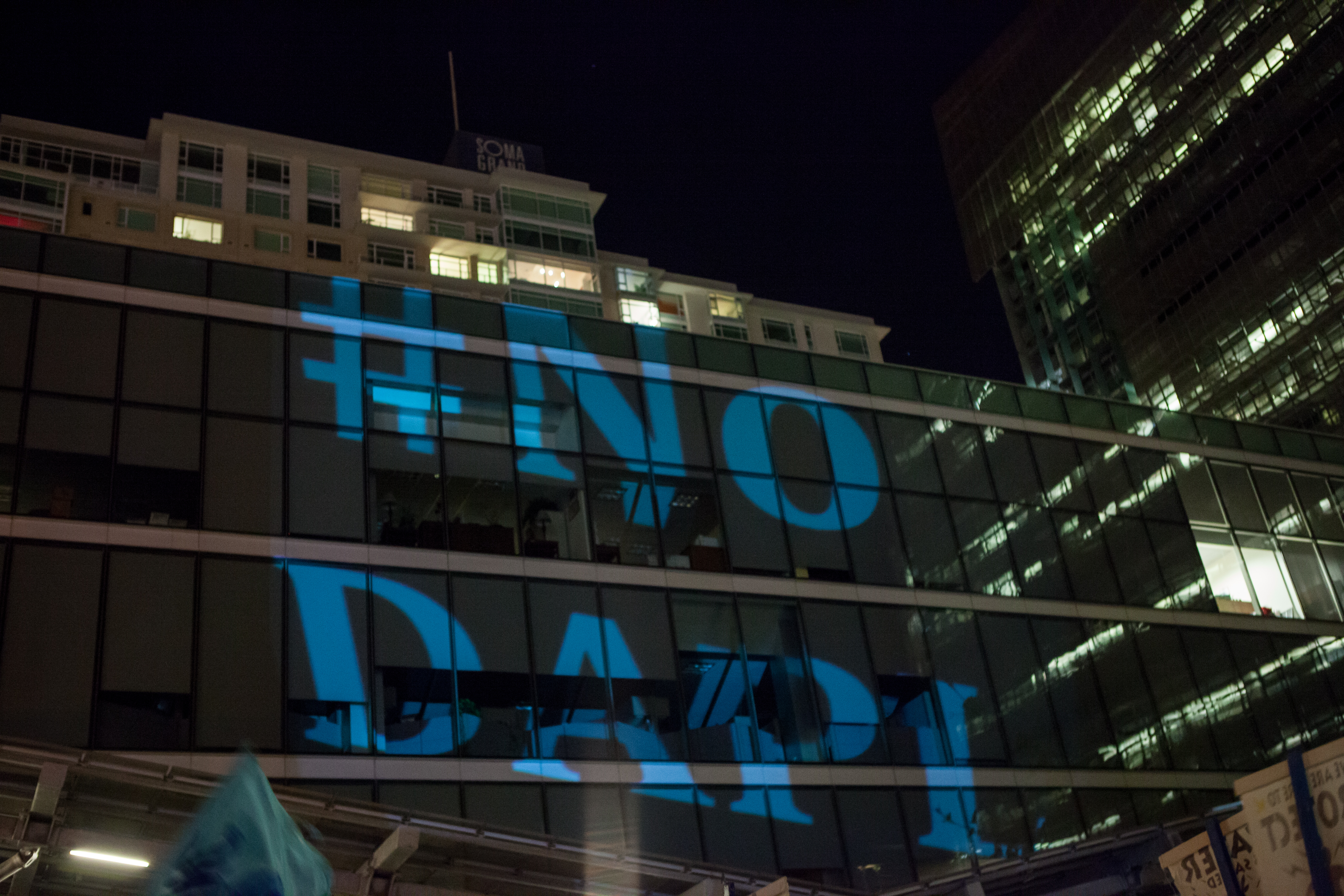
Protesters against the Dakota Access Pipeline project their hashtag on walls

#NODAPL, also referred to as the Dakota Access Pipeline protests, is a Twitter hashtag and social media campaign for the struggle against the proposed and partially built Dakota Access Pipeline. The role social media played in this movement is so substantial that the movement itself is now often referred to by its hashtag: #NoDAPL. The hashtag reflected a grassroots campaign that began in early 2016 in reaction to the approved construction of the Dakota Access Pipeline in the northern United States. The Standing Rock Sioux and allied organizations took legal action aimed at stopping construction of the project, while youth from the reservation began a social media campaign which gradually evolved into a larger movement with dozens of associated hashtags. The campaign aimed to raise awareness on the threat of the pipeline on the sacred burial grounds as well as the quality of water in the area. In June 2021, a federal judge struck down the Standing Rock Sioux Tribe's lawsuit, but left the option of reopening the case should any prior orders be violated.

== Background ==
The Dakota Access Pipeline is a 1,172-mile-long (1,886 km) underground oil pipeline in the United States. It begins in the Bakken shale oil fields in northwest North Dakota and continues through South Dakota and Iowa to the oil tank farm near Patoka, Illinois. Together with the Energy Transfer Crude Oil Pipeline from Patoka to Nederland, Texas, it forms the Bakken system. The $3.78 billion project was announced to the public in June 2014, and the #NoDAPL movement began when Energy Transfer Partners announced its plans for an oil pipeline route across lands and waterways of cultural, spiritual and environmental significance to the Lakota Nation and other communities downstream.

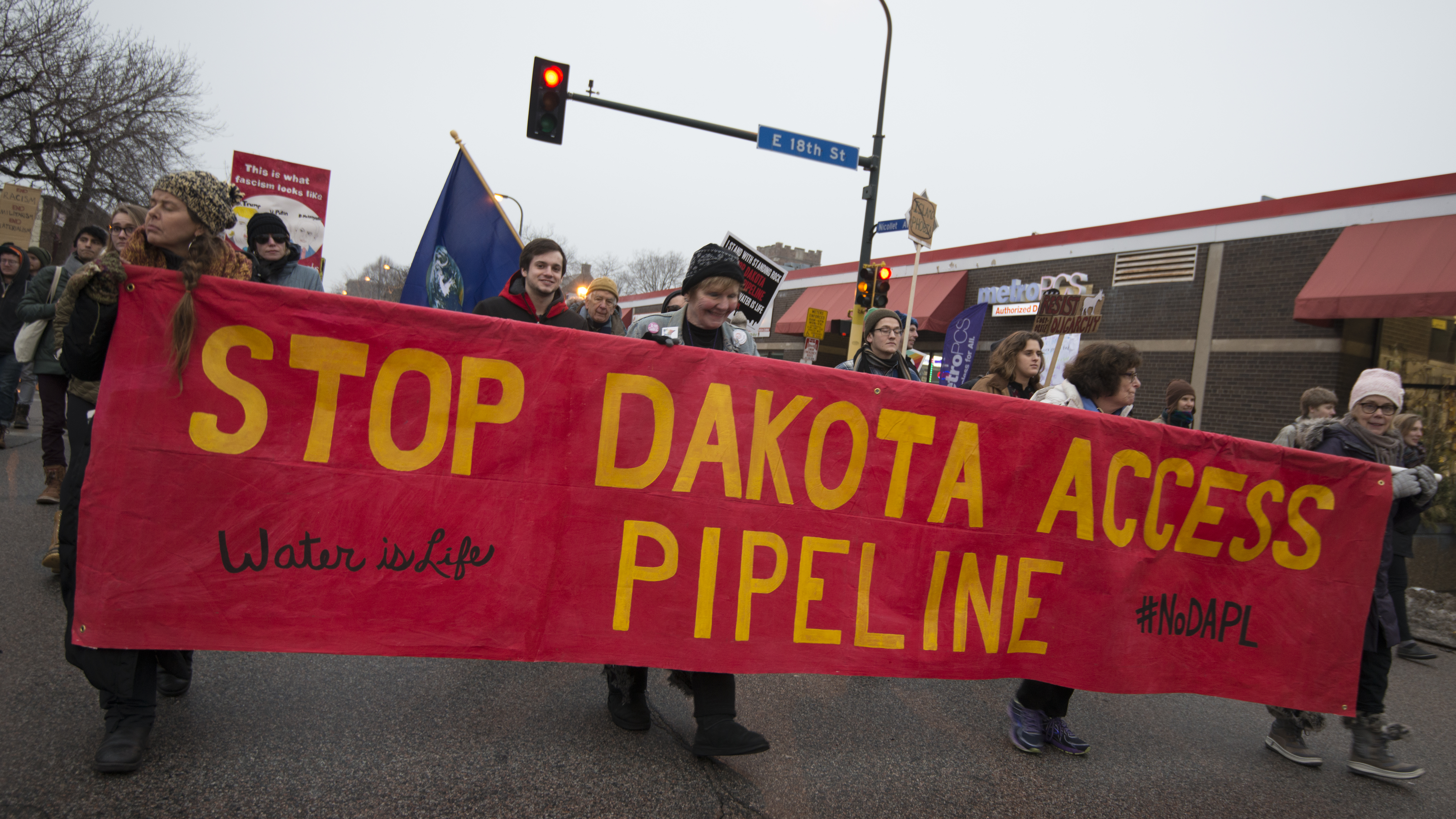
Protesters walking the streets to protest the proposed construction of the Dakota Access Pipeline

The pipeline's impact on the environment has been controversial. A number of Native Americans in Iowa and the Dakotas, including the Meskwaki and several Sioux tribal nations, have opposed the pipeline under the assertion that it would threaten sacred burial grounds as well as the quality of water in the area. A protest at the pipeline site in North Dakota near the Standing Rock Indian Reservation drew international attention shortly after the announcement of this project. In September 2016, construction workers bulldozed a section of land that the tribe had identified as sacred ground, and when protesters entered the area, security workers used attack dogs which bit at least six of the protesters. The incident was filmed and viewed by several million people on YouTube and other social media.

The video footage of the attack dogs and usage of #NoDAPL on social media sparked more protests. In November 2016, police were filmed hitting protesters with water cannons in sub-zero temperatures. Authorities said the Iowa section of the pipeline was the target of arson in 2016. The pipeline suffered millions of dollars in damages due to deliberately set fires.

While protests went on near construction sites and legal battles continued in the courtroom, legislators also clashed over the pipeline. U.S. Bernie Sanders (I-Vt.) announced opposition to the pipeline in August 2016. Sanders, along with four other senators, called for President Barack Obama to halt the pipeline's construction in October 2016.

The pipeline has been operational since 2017.

== Social media ==
The movement was largely started by Indigenous youth, who used social media campaigns to create awareness for the cause. A young indigenous girl named Tokata Iron Eyes and her teenage friends are credited with starting the #NoDAPL movement. As part of the Standing Rock Youth, a group of about 30 young people from the Standing Rock Sioux community, they decided to go online and make the issue of the Dakota Access Pipeline Construction known. Protests against the pipeline project captured the attention of Social Media users across the globe under the slogan #NoDAPL aka "No Dakota Access Pipeline."

The #NoDAPL movement utilized various social media platforms, such as Twitter, Instagram, Facebook, and YouTube, to gain awareness of the issue occurring at Standing Rock. The people's petition spread across social media and gained an immense support in a short amount of time.

The hashtag #NoDAPL was only the start for many hashtags that followed along on Twitter, Facebook, and Instagram to protest the pipeline. The hashtags #ReZpectOurWater, which is a play on “reservations,” #StandWithStandingRock, and #WaterisLife gained great prominence as well. Activist Naomi Klein posted a Facebook video in which she interviewed a youth, Iron Eyes, which gained more than a million views in 24 hours. Facebook Live allowed large numbers of people to understand what is actually happening on the ground. For example, Facebook check-ins played a big role in spreading the issue to large audiences. Shortly after its creation, millions of tweets used the hashtags #NoDAPL or #StandWithStandingRock.

Celebrities have also shown support for the hashtag. Celebrities such as Shailene Woodley, Rosario Dawson, and many others have shown their support at protests and throughout social media. In October 2016, Woodley was arrested for criminal trespassing while demonstrating in Saint Anthony, North Dakota.

== See also ==
- Dakota Access Pipeline
- Declaration on the Rights of Indigenous Peoples
- Hashtag activism
- Women and the environment
