= Dakota Access Pipeline protests =

2016–17 series of protests in the United States

Dakota Access Pipeline Protests
- No DAPL Part of Protests against Donald Trump, Water protectors movement, Indigenous rights
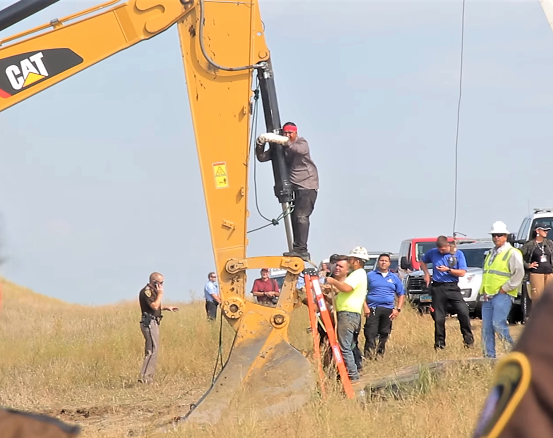
- A Lakota man locks himself to construction equipment in protest
- Date: April 2016 – February 2017
- Location: United States, especially North Dakota, the Standing Rock Sioux Reservation, the Missouri River, the Mississippi River, South Dakota, Iowa, Illinois
- Caused by: Protection of water, land, and religious/spiritual sites sacred to indigenous peoples of the Americas
- Status: In courts

Casualties
- Deaths: 1
- Injuries: 300
- Arrested: 800+

The Dakota Access Pipeline Protests or the Standing Rock Protests, also known by the hashtag #NoDAPL, were a series of grassroots Native American protests against the construction of the Dakota Access Pipeline in the northern United States that began in April 2016. Protests ended on February 23, 2017, when National Guard and law enforcement officers evicted the last remaining protesters.

The pipeline runs from the Bakken oil fields in western North Dakota to southern Illinois, crossing beneath the Missouri and Mississippi rivers, as well as under part of Lake Oahe near the Standing Rock Sioux Reservation. Many members of the Standing Rock Sioux Tribe and surrounding communities consider the pipeline to be a serious threat to the region's water. The construction also directly threatens ancient burial grounds and cultural sites of historic importance.

The protests were not successful and the pipeline came online in May 2017. In 2025, a North Dakota jury found that Greenpeace USA and Greenpeace International had committed trespass, nuisance, civil conspiracy and other acts against Energy Transfer LP, the pipeline's builder. The court ordered Greenpeace to pay $345 million in damages. As of 2026, litigation is ongoing.

== Background ==
During September 2014, the Standing Rock Sioux Tribal (SRST) council met with Energy Transfer representatives for an initial consultation, which was more than a month before the pipeline's first formal submission to the Army Corps. At the beginning of the meeting, Councilman David Archambault II indicated the tribe's opposition to the project within treaty boundaries. Additional SRST representatives voiced opposition and concerns about the pipeline.

In April 2016, youth from Standing Rock and surrounding Native American communities organized a campaign to stop the pipeline, calling themselves "ReZpect Our Water". Inspired by the youth, several adults, including Joye Braun of the Indigenous Environmental Network and tribal historian LaDonna Brave Bull Allard, established a water protectors' camp as a center for direct action, demonstrating spiritual resistance to the pipeline in both a defence of Indigenous sovereignty and cultural preservation. The #NoDAPL hashtag began to trend on social media, and the camps at Standing Rock gradually grew to thousands of people.

== Protests ==
Conflict between water protectors and law enforcement escalated through the summer and fall. In September 2016, construction workers bulldozed a section of privately owned land that the tribe had claimed as sacred ground. When protesters trespassed into the area, security workers used attack dogs which bit at least six of the demonstrators and one horse. In October 2016, militarized police cleared an encampment which was situated on the proposed path of the pipeline. In November 2016, police used multiple launched tear gas canisters and water cannons on protesters in freezing weather, consequently drawing significant media attention.

Pipeline protests were reported as early as October 2014, when Iowa community and environmental activists presented 2,300 petitions to Iowa Governor Terry Branstad asking him to sign a state executive order to stop it. Voicing concerns for damage to wildlife habitat and sacred sites, the Sac & Fox Tribe of the Mississippi in Iowa (Meskwaki Nation) also objected to the route and formally lodged their opposition in early 2015. Tribal members were also among those who opposed the Keystone XL pipeline. In a letter to the Iowa Utilities Board, Tribal chairwoman Judith Bender wrote that there were "environmental concerns about the land and drinking water...it will only take one mistake and life in Iowa will change for the next thousands of years."

The tribe sued for an injunction on the grounds that the U.S. Army Corps of Engineers had failed to conduct a proper environmental and cultural impact study. Protests had escalated at the pipeline site in North Dakota, with numbers swelling from just a bare handful of people to hundreds and then thousands over the summer.

The Standing Rock Sioux tribe believes that the pipeline would put the Missouri River, the water source for the reservation, at risk. They pointed out two recent spills on other pipeline systems, a 2010 pipeline spill into the Kalamazoo River in Michigan, which cost over a billion dollars to clean up with significant contamination remaining, and a 2015 Bakken crude oil spill into the Yellowstone River in Montana. The Tribe was also concerned that the pipeline route may run through sacred Sioux sites. In August 2016 protests were held, halting a portion of the pipeline near Cannon Ball, North Dakota. Protests continued and drew indigenous peoples from throughout North America, as well as other supporters. A number of planned arrests occurred when people locked themselves to heavy machinery.

On August 23, 2016, the Standing Rock Sioux Tribe released a list of 87 tribal governments who wrote resolutions, proclamations and letters of support stating their solidarity with Standing Rock and the Sioux people. Since then, many more Native American organizations, politicians, environmental groups and civil rights groups joined the effort in North Dakota, including the Black Lives Matter movement, indigenous leaders from the Amazon Basin of South America, Vermont Senator Bernie Sanders, the 2016 Green Party presidential candidate Jill Stein and her running mate Ajamu Baraka, and many more. The Washington Post called it a "National movement for Native Americans." As of September, the protest constituted the single largest gathering of Native Americans in more than 100 years.

=== United Nations presentation ===
On September 20, 2016, Standing Rock Tribal Chairman David Archambault II addressed the UN Human Rights Council in Geneva, Switzerland, where he called "upon all parties to stop the construction of the Dakota Access Pipeline." Citing the 1851 Treaty of Traverse des Sioux and 1868 Treaty of Fort Laramie, two treaties ratified by the U.S. Senate that recognize the Sioux's national sovereignty, Archambault told the Council that "the oil companies and the government of the United States have failed to respect our sovereign rights."

On September 22, 2016, Victoria Tauli-Corpuz, a United Nations expert on the rights of Indigenous peoples, admonished the U.S., saying, "the tribe was denied access to information and excluded from consultations at the planning stage of the project, and environmental assessments failed to disclose the presence and proximity of the Standing Rock Sioux Reservation." She also responded to the rights of pipeline protesters, saying, "the U.S. authorities should fully protect and facilitate the right to freedom of peaceful assembly of Indigenous peoples, which plays a key role in empowering their ability to claim other rights."

=== Security confrontations & violence ===
On September 3, 2016, the Dakota Access Pipeline brought in a private security firm when the company used bulldozers to dig up part of the pipeline route that contained possible burial sites and culturally significant artifacts; it was subject to a pending injunction motion. The bulldozers arrived within a day after Standing Rock Sioux filed legal action. Energy Transfer bulldozers cut a two-mile (3200 m) long, 150-foot (45 m) wide path through the contested area.

The report by Goodman

When protesters crossed the perimeter fence onto private property to stop the bulldozers, they were confronted with pepper spray and guard dogs. At least six protesters were treated for dog bites, and an estimated 30 were pepper-sprayed before the guards and their dogs left the scene in trucks. A woman that had taken part in the incident stated, "The cops watched the whole thing from up on the hills. It felt like they were trying to provoke us into being violent when we're peaceful." The incident was filmed by Amy Goodman and a crew from Democracy Now! Footage shows several people with dog bites and a dog with blood on its muzzle.

Frost Kennels of Hartville, Ohio, acknowledged that they were involved in the incident on September 3. Executive director for Private Investigator Security Guard Services, Geoff Dutton, said Frost Kennels and its owner, Bob Frost, were not licensed by the state of Ohio to provide security services or guard dogs. Morton County Sheriff, Kyle Kirchmeier, said they were investigating both sides in the incident, including wounds inflicted by the dogs, and that they had no prior knowledge of the use of dogs until a 9-1-1 call was made. When asked why the deputies who witnessed the incident did not intervene, Kirchmeier cited officer security concerns, and stated that it was "more like a riot than a protest" and that there was an investigation into "the incident and individuals who organized and participated in this unlawful event." On the Energy Transfer/Dakota Access side, four security guards were injured, 1 of whom had to be hospitalized.

After viewing footage of the attack, a law enforcement consultant who trains police dogs called it "absolutely appalling" and "reprehensible". "Taking bite dogs and putting them at the end of a leash to intimidate, threaten and prevent crime is not appropriate." A former K-9 officer for the Grand Forks Police Department who now owns a security firm that uses dogs for drug detection said, "It reminded me of the civil rights movement back in the '60s. I didn't think it was appropriate. They were overwhelmed and it just wasn't proper use of the dogs."

The American Civil Liberties Union of North Dakota spoke out against the use of dogs and pepper spray and asked that the state officials "treat everyone fairly and equally." Speaking on September 4, Ojibwe activist and former Green Party vice presidential candidate Winona LaDuke said, "North Dakota regulators are really, I would say, in bed with the oil industry and so they have looked the other way."

As of mid-October 2016, there had been over 140 arrests. Some protesters who were arrested for misdemeanors and taken to the Morton County jail reported what they considered harsh and unusual treatment. Sara Jumping Eagle, a physician on the Standing Rock Sioux Reservation, said that she was required to remove all of her clothing and "squat and cough" when she was arrested for disorderly conduct. In another such case, LaDonna Brave Bull Allard, who founded Sacred Stone Camp, said that when her daughter was arrested and taken into custody she was "strip-searched in front of multiple male officers, then left for hours in her cell, naked and freezing." Cody Hall from Cheyenne River Reservation in South Dakota also reported being strip-searched. He was held for four days without bail or bond and then charged with two misdemeanors.

Actress Shailene Woodley, arrested on October 10, 2016, along with 27 others, also said she was strip-searched, adding, "Never did it cross my mind that while trying to protect clean water, trying to ensure a future where our children have access to an element essential for human survival, would I be strip-searched. I was just shocked." Amnesty International spoke out against the use of strip searches and said that they had sent a letter to the Morton County Sheriff's Department expressing concern about the degree of force used against people taking part in the protests. They sent a delegation of human rights observers to monitor law enforcement's response to the protests.

Protesters said they were blasted with high-pitched sound cannons and described being held in cages that "appeared to be" dog kennels, in the garage of the Morton County Correctional Center, with identifying numbers written on their arms by the arresting officers. One of the arrestees, Floris White Bull, said - “We were caged in dog kennels and sat on the floor and we were marked with numbers,” she said. “My mind, I couldn’t wrap it around the fact that this is happening today. This isn’t something that we’re reading in history books.”

In December 2016, it was reported by Charlie May that Dakota Access LLC had hired the firm TigerSwan to provide security during the protest. In May 2017, internal TigerSwan documents leaked to The Intercept and other documents obtained through public records requests revealed a close collaboration between the pipeline company and local, state, and federal law enforcement as they carried out "military-style counterterrorism measures" to suppress the protesters. TigerSwan also collected information used to assist prosecutors in building cases against protesters, and used social media in an attempt to sway public support for the pipeline. One of the released documents called the pipeline opposition movement "an ideologically driven insurgency with a strong religious component" that operated along a "jihadist insurgency model". The Intercept reported that "Energy Transfer Partners has continued to retain TigerSwan long after most of the anti-pipeline campers left North Dakota, and the most recent TigerSwan reports emphasize the threat of growing activism around other pipeline projects across the country."

=== Police move to clear camp ===
On October 27, 2016, police from several agencies, including North Dakota state troopers, the National Guard, and other law enforcement agencies from surrounding states, began an intensive operation to clear out a protest camp and blockades along Highway 1806. The Morton County Sheriff's Department said in a statement: "Protesters' escalated unlawful behavior this weekend by setting up illegal roadblocks, trespassing onto private property and establishing an encampment, has forced law enforcement to respond at this time. I can't stress it enough, this is a public safety issue. We cannot have protesters blocking county roads, blocking state highways, or trespassing on private property."

A Seattle Times journalist present at the confrontation described it as "scary". On the PBS Newshour, she said that she had spent the previous night in the camp "with tribal members who were singing their death songs. I mean, they were very worried about the possibility of violence. And who wouldn't be? You have seen law enforcement marshaled from six states, armored personnel carriers, hundreds and hundreds of law enforcement officers with concussion grenades, mace, Tasers, batons. And they used all of it. I mean, it was frightening to watch." She said that the confrontation ended the following day and said, "the law enforcement officers had advance[d] more than 100 yards with five armored personnel carriers side by side, hundreds of law enforcement officers advancing on them. And it finally took an elder to actually walk by himself in between the two lines, stand there, face his people, and say: 'Go home. We're here to fight the pipeline, not these people, and we can only win this with prayer.'"

Black Lives Matter co-founder Alicia Garza contrasted the aggressive police action with the treatment of the organizers of a standoff at an Oregon wildlife refuge (acquitted of federal charges on the same day as the police raid of the camp), saying "If you're white, you can occupy federal property ... and get found not guilty. No teargas, no tanks, no rubber bullets ... If you're indigenous and fighting to protect our earth, and the water we depend on to survive, you get tear gassed, media blackouts, tanks and all that."

=== Backwater Bridge incident ===
Backwater Bridge is a bridge on Highway 1806 spanning Canta Peta Creek. It is just north of the Standing Rock Reservation and about a mile (1600 m) south of where the pipeline developer planned to drill. In October 2016, protestors burned three vehicles on Backwater Bridge. Afterwards, North Dakota law enforcement added barriers to Backwater Bridge, due to both potential structural integrity issues from the vehicles burned and as a choke point to contain protestors.

On the evening of November 20, protesters attempted to open Backwater Bridge on Highway 1806, which had been blocked since October 27. According to the sheriff's department, the bridge was closed for safety reasons "due to damage caused after protesters set numerous fires" on it on October 27. But the protesters believe that the police used the closure to "lock [them] in" and that the closure blocked access for emergency vehicles coming from the north. U.S. District Judge Daniel Traynor described the events of November 20th as a "significant protestor riot" in a court decision held after a bench trial in 2025.

Police initially used a loudspeaker to order protestors to disperse. According to news reports, the police launched an attack on the protesters with water cannons in 28 °F (−2 °C) weather, along with teargas, rubber bullets, and concussion grenades, injuring hundreds. The police said the protesters had been "very aggressive" and that the water was used to put out multiple fires they had set, while the protesters said the fires were peaceful bonfires used to keep warm. A number of videos posted on social media show protesters being doused with continuous streams of water. Initially the Morton County Sheriff's Office said the water was used only to put out fires, but the following day Sheriff Kirchmeier corrected that statement, saying, "Some of the water was used to repel some of the protest activities" and adding that it was "sprayed more as a mist and we didn't want to get it directly on them but we wanted to make sure to use it as a measure to keep everybody safe." According to District Judge Daniel Traynor, protestors threw rocks, bottles, and, Molotov cocktails at North Dakota law enforcement officers.

A woman's arm was seriously injured by what she and supporters claim was an explosive flash-bang grenade thrown by law enforcement, but which law enforcement suggest may have been an exploding propane canister. The victim's father stated in a press conference that his daughter had seen a police officer throw the explosive device directly at her as she was backing away. The Morton County Sheriff's Department denied using concussion grenades, and reported that protesters were throwing expended propane canisters at police during this period. The Standing Rock Medic & Healer Council refuted law enforcement's claims in a statement, citing eye-witness accounts of seeing police throw concussion grenades, 'the lack of charring of flesh at the wound site' and 'grenade pieces that have been removed from her arm in surgery and will be saved for legal proceedings'. Law enforcement, including the ATF and North Dakota Bureau of Criminal Investigation, are investigating the incident.

=== Removal of remaining protesters and garbage ===
By mid January 2017 the protest camp had dwindled to a few hundred people due to the construction work stoppage and harsh winter weather. Standing Rock Chairman Dave Archambault called for the camp to disband because of the weather and the possibility of contamination of the river with garbage and debris during the spring flood. He asked people to clean up the area and to leave. In January 2017, it was reported that the cost of policing the pipeline protests in North Dakota had surpassed $22 million. In February 2017, amid concerns that warmer weather would accelerate flooding of the area, removal of garbage and debris from the campsite began to prevent the contamination of the river. Archambault indicated that funds from the $6 million in donations the tribe received to support its fight would be used to clean up the garbage, building material and human waste at the camp. The tribe began coordinating cleanup of the site in January 2017.

On February 22, 2017, the protest site was cleared. Although many left voluntarily, ten people were arrested. On February 23, National Guard and law enforcement officers evicted the remaining protesters. Thirty-three people were arrested. After the protest site was abandoned, sanitation crews cleared garbage from the protest; this included abandoned cars and human waste. Also abandoned were 12 dogs. North Dakota Department of Emergency Services estimated that about 21 million pounds of garbage was removed; the cost of cleaning up the protest site was about $1 million. The costs were funded by the USACE, meaning taxpayers ultimately paid for the cleanup.

== Pipeline ==
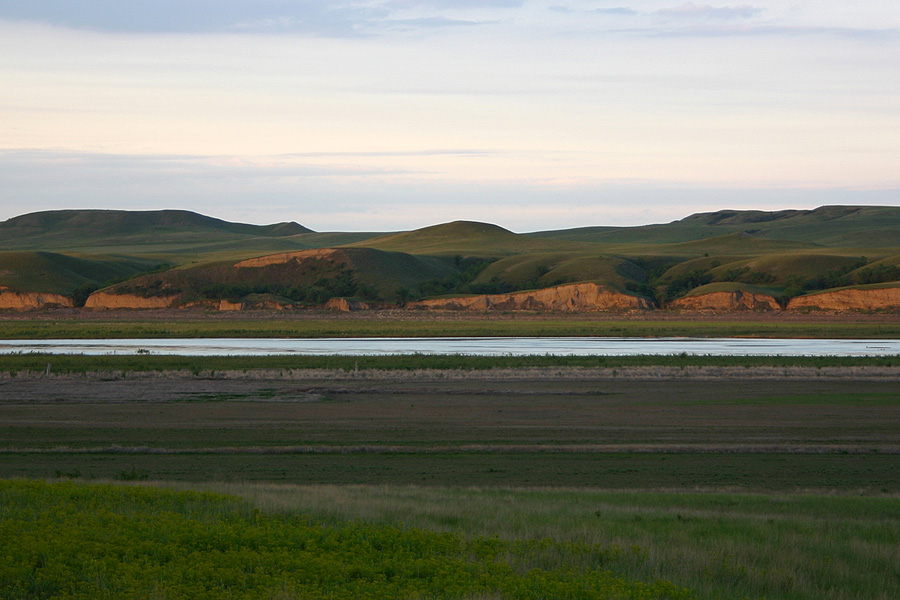
Cannonball River area, North Dakota

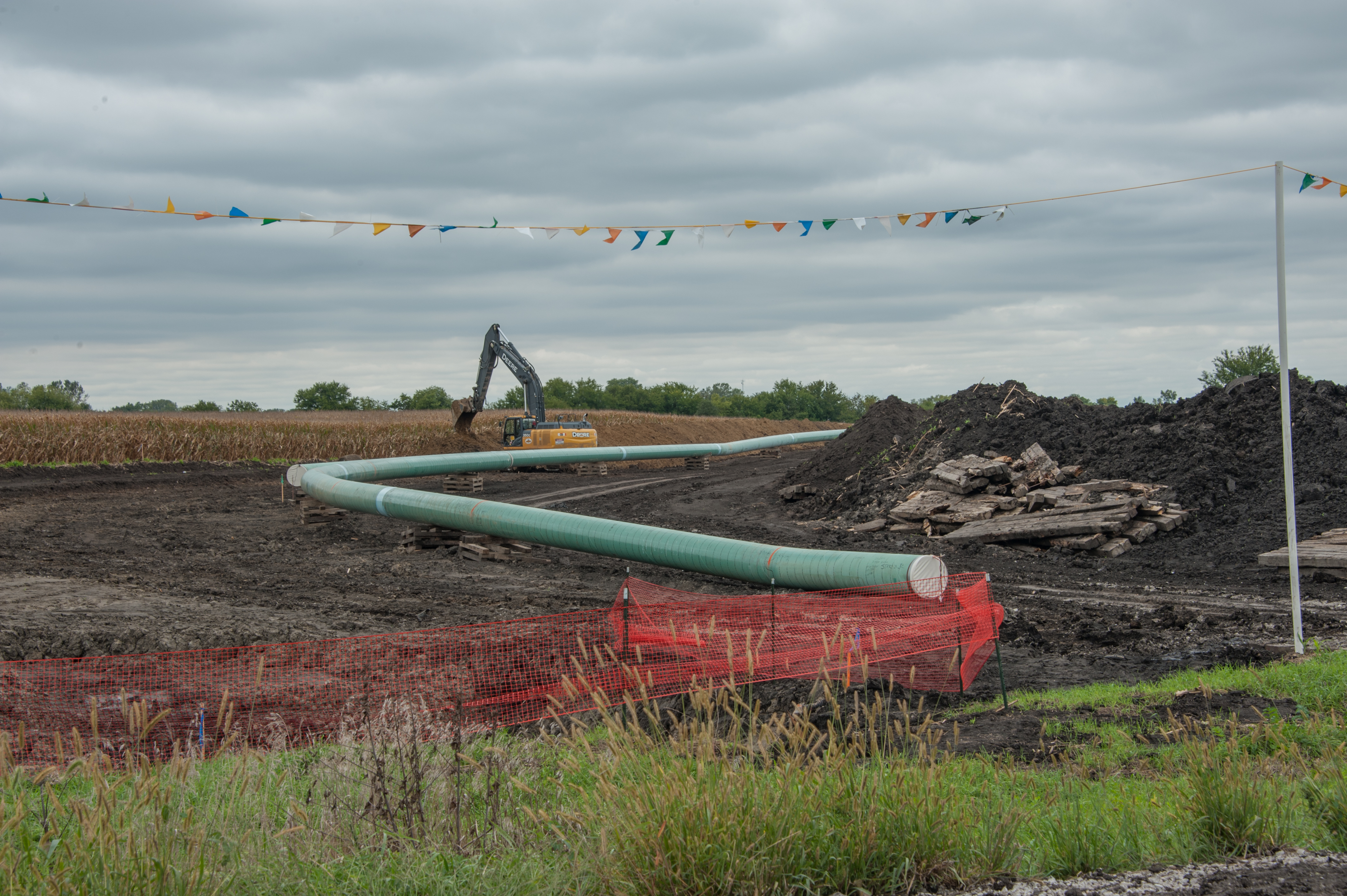
The Dakota Access Pipeline being built in central Iowa

The Dakota Access Pipeline, a part of the Bakken pipeline project, is a 1,172-mile-long (1,886 km) underground oil pipeline in the United States. The pipeline was planned by Dakota Access, LLC, a subsidiary of a Dallas, Texas corporation named Energy Transfer Partners, L.P. It begins in the Bakken oil fields in Northwest North Dakota and travels in a relatively straight line southeast, through South Dakota and Iowa, ending at the oil terminal near Patoka, Illinois. According to court records, the pipeline was due for delivery on January 1, 2017.

Routing the pipeline across the Missouri River near Bismarck was rejected because of the route's proximity to municipal water sources; residential areas; roads, wetland, and waterway crossings. The Bismarck route would also have been 11 miles (18 km) longer. The alternative selected by the Corps of Engineers crosses underneath the Missouri River, half a mile (800 m) from the Standing Rock Sioux Reservation, and parallels the existing Northern Border Pipeline. A spill could have major adverse effects on the waters that the Standing Rock Reserve relies upon. Using a permit process that treated the pipeline as a series of small construction sites, the pipeline was granted an exemption from the environmental review required by the Clean Water Act and the National Environmental Policy Act.

However, citing potential adverse effects on Native American tribes, most notably the Standing Rock Sioux, in March and April 2016 the Environmental Protection Agency (EPA), the Department of Interior (DOI), and the Advisory Council on Historic Preservation asked the U.S. Army Corps of Engineers to conduct a formal Environmental Impact Assessment and issue an Environmental Impact Statement (EIS).

Noting that the water system serving Fort Yates on the Standing Rock Reservation was only 10 miles (16 km) downstream of where the pipeline would cross Lake Oahe and the Missouri River, the EPA recommended that the Army Corps revise its Environmental Assessment and open up a second public comment period. The DOI also expressed concerns about the pipeline's proximity to the tribe's water source. Waters of a sufficient quantity and quality are legally obligated to be held in reserve for the Standing Rock Community. However, more than 800,000 acres of Standing Rock's entrusted land risked being impacted by a leak or spill, which could severely impact the waters which the community relies upon for both drinking and spiritual purposes.

By late 2016, the United States Department of Justice had received more than 33,000 petitions to review all permits and order a full review of the project's environmental effects.

Despite the mass opposition to the Pipeline, as of August 2021, expansion construction continues; the line can now transport 750,000 barrels of oil daily, which is 180,000 more than previous limits. The company Energy Transfer plans to add pump stations to boost the pipeline's efficiency and speed. Once the full expansion is up and running, as much as 1.1 million barrels of oil will flow through the pipeline each day. The attorney of the Standing Rock Sioux Tribe noted that the court ordered Corps review of the pipeline impact was intended "to study the impact of things before they occur, not after.”

== Camps ==
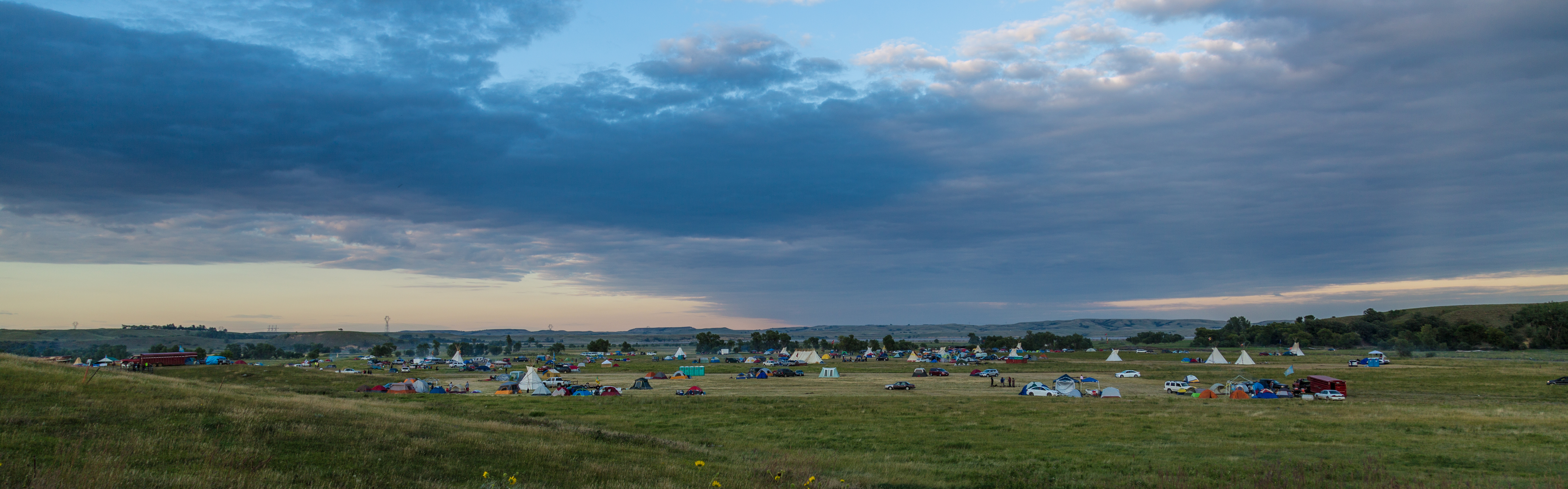
Sacred Stone Camp

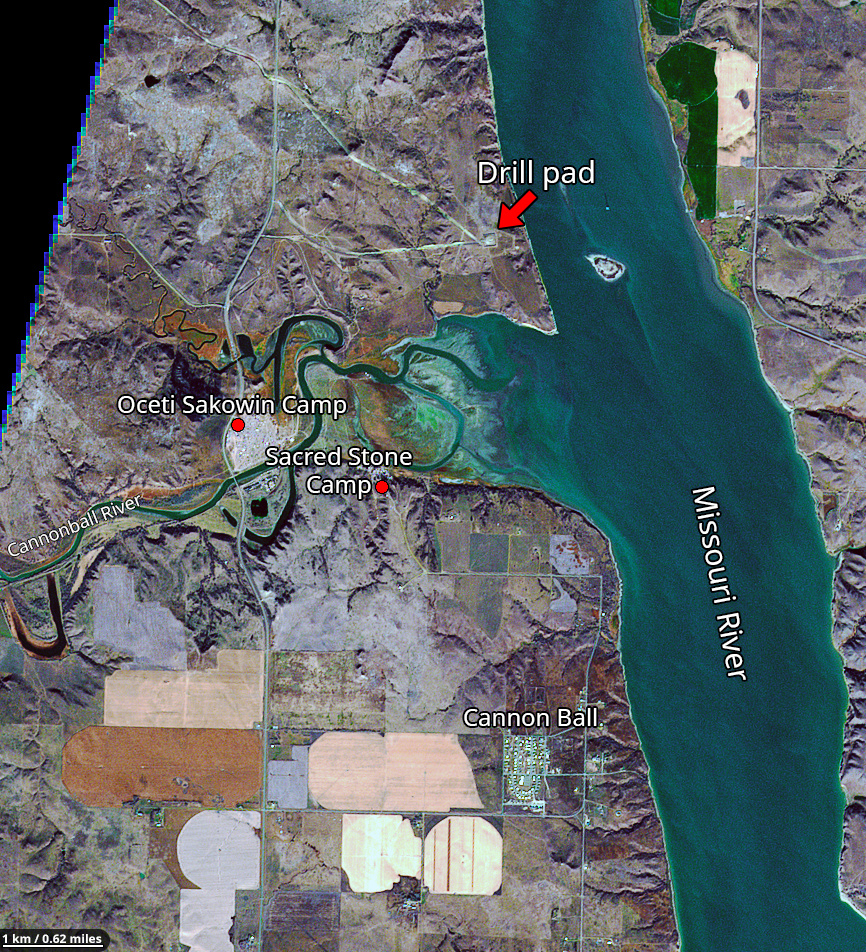
Campsite location

Brenda White Bull, descendant of Sitting Bull, speaks at the UN Permanent Forum on Indigenous Issues about fight against Dakota Access and State Violence, April 25, 2017

Protestors established three main camps: Sacred Stone Camp; Oceti Sakowin Camp (also called Main Camp and Seven Councils Camp), and Rosebud Camp. Sacred Stone Camp was founded by Standing Rock's Historic Preservation Officer, LaDonna Brave Bull Allard, on April 1, 2016, as a center for cultural preservation and spiritual resistance to the Dakota Access pipeline. In the spring and early summer of 2016, Allard and other Indigenous leaders focused on media outreach, resulting in tribal delegations and individuals coming to stand with them from all over the country and—eventually—the world. As the numbers grew beyond what the land could support, an overflow camp was also established nearby, which came to be known as the Očhéthi Šakówiŋ camp (the Lakȟótiyapi name for the Great Sioux Nation or Seven Fires Council). In September, Allard said that 26 of the 380 archaeological sites that face desecration along the pipeline route are held sacred to the Sioux Nations, the Arikara, the Mandan, and the Northern Cheyenne, comparing the pipeline's construction through said sites to genocide. All three main camps were on US Army Corps of Engineers-managed land.

By late September, NBC News reported that members of more than 300 federally recognized Native American tribes were residing in the three main camps, alongside an estimated 3,000 to 4,000 additional pipeline resistance demonstrators. Several thousand more gathered at the camps on weekends. As winter approached, numbers grew lower, but the protesters winterized and prepared for an indefinite stay. In October, another camp called "Winter Camp" was established on Energy Transfer Partners private property—directly in the pipeline's proposed path. Citing eminent domain, Native American protesters declared that the land rightly belongs to them under the 1851 Treaty of Fort Laramie. Though the initial territory agreed to in the treaty was later broken up into smaller reservations, the treaty was never nullified and was thus being invoked as law. Morton County Sheriff, Kyle Kirchmeier, claimed that the Winter Camp was a threat to public safety, stating that "we can not have protesters blocking county roads, blocking state highways, or trespassing on private property." Following, on October 27, police in riot gear with crowd control equipment and supported by National Guard members removed the protesters from the new encampment. They used methods such as pepper spray, bean-bag shot guns, concussion grenades and mace. Law enforcement further used Long Range Acoustic Devices (LRAD), which are used to make noises as at piercing frequency and volume. Protestors remained on site nonetheless, setting blockades, bridges and tires on the highway afire.

Standing Rock Water protectors

== Legal proceedings ==
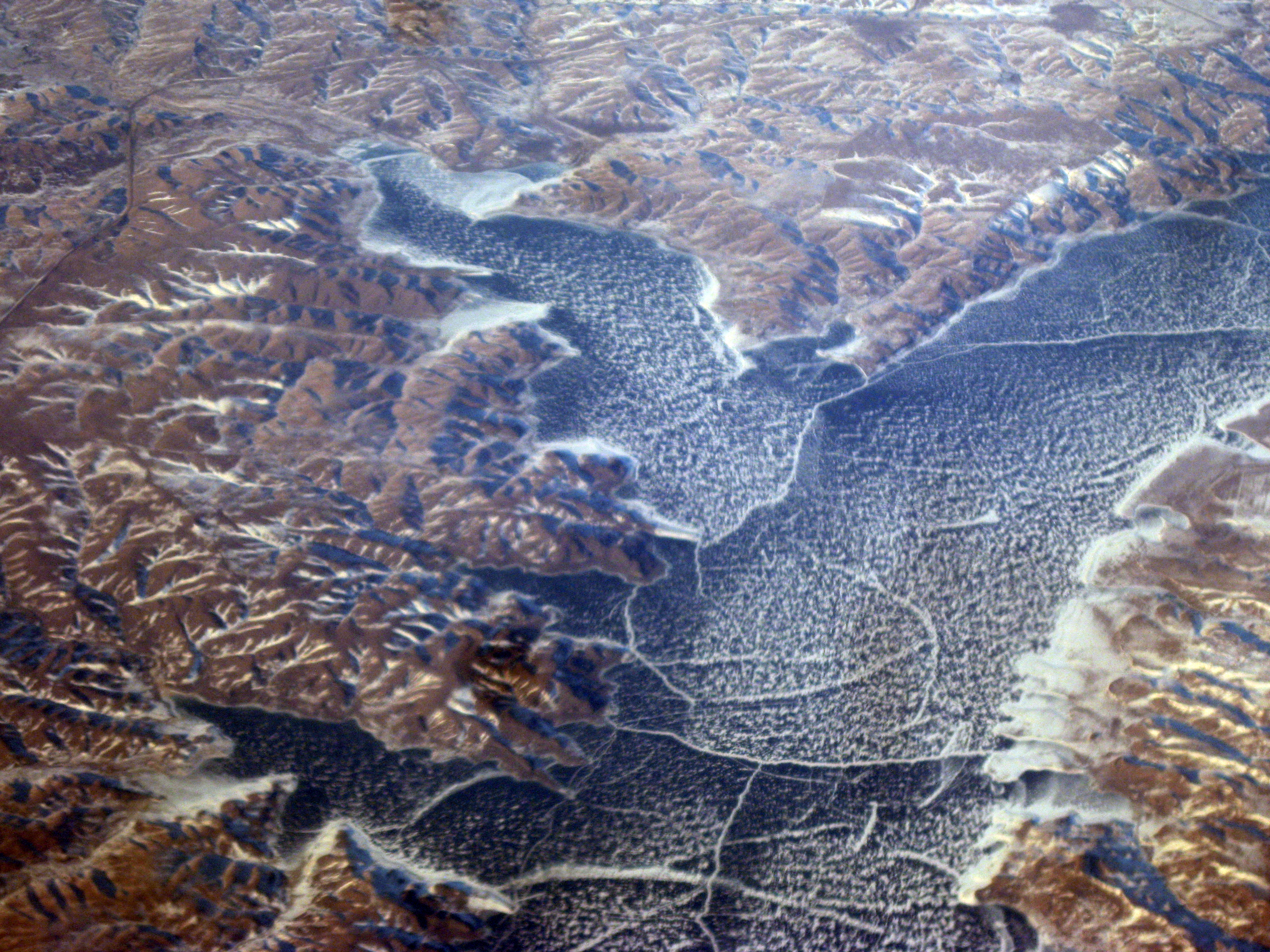
Lake Oahe in winter

On July 27, 2016, two days after the U.S. Army Corps of Engineers issued the Environmental Assessment with a finding of “no significant impact”, the Standing Rock Sioux Tribe, supported by EarthJustice, filed a lawsuit in the United States District Court for the District of Columbia, seeking declaratory and injunctive relief to stop the pipeline. The tribe also sought a preliminary injunction.

On September 9, U.S. District Judge James Boasberg denied the motion, noting, "[T]he Corps has documented dozens of attempts to engage Standing Rock in consultations to identify historical resources at Lake Oahe and other PCN crossings....Suffice it to say that the Tribe largely refused to engage in consultations."

Later the same day, a joint statement was issued by the US Departments of Justice, Army, and Interior temporarily halting the project on federal land bordering or under the Lake Oahe reservoir. The US federal government asked the company for a "voluntary pause" on construction near that area until further study was done on the region extending 20 miles (32 km) around Lake Oahe. In closing the agency representatives said:

Finally, we fully support the rights of all Americans to assemble and speak freely. In recent days, we have seen thousands of demonstrators come together peacefully, with support from scores of sovereign tribal governments, to exercise their First Amendment rights and to voice heartfelt concerns about the environment and historic, sacred sites. It is now incumbent on all of us to develop a path forward that serves the broadest public interest.

Energy Transfer Partners rejected the request to voluntarily halt construction on all surrounding private land and resumed construction within 48 hours.

On September 13, chairman and CEO of Energy Transfer Partners Kelcy Warren responded to the federal government's request, saying concerns about the pipeline's impact on the water supply were "unfounded." Warren said that "multiple archaeological studies conducted with state historic preservation offices found no sacred items along the route". They did not indicate that they would voluntarily cease work on the pipeline. Warren wrote that the company will meet with officials in Washington "to understand their position and reiterate our commitment to bring the Dakota Access Pipeline into operation."

On October 5, federal appeals judges heard arguments over whether to stop work on the pipeline; a ruling was not expected for several weeks. At that time the Army Corps of Engineers had not yet made a final decision on whether to grant an easement to build under the Missouri River. Under questioning, a pipeline attorney said that "if the court allowed it, the company would continue building up to the lake's edge even before the easement decision, because each extra month of delay will cost the company more than $80 million".

=== Army Corps of Engineers ===
On November 14, the Army Corps of Engineers said it needed more time to study the impact of the plan. In a news release, they said: "The Army has determined that additional discussion and analysis are warranted in light of the history of the Great Sioux Nation's dispossessions of lands, the importance of Lake Oahe to the Tribe, our government-to-government relationship, and the statute governing easements through government property."

Energy Transfer Partners responded by criticizing the Obama administration for "political interference" and said that "further delay in the consideration of this case would add millions of dollars more each month in costs which cannot be recovered." North Dakota Governor Jack Dalrymple criticized the decision saying the pipeline would be safe and that the decision was "long overdue". Craig Stevens, spokesman for the MAIN Coalition, a labor group, called the Corps's announcement "yet another attempt at death by delay" and said the Obama administration "has chosen to further fan the flames of protest by more inaction." North Dakota Senator John Hoeven said in a statement that the delay "will only prolong the disruption in the region caused by protests and make life difficult for everyone who lives and works in the area."

Speaking on the PBS Newshour on November 16, Energy Transfer Partners CEO Kelcy Warren responded to questions about the Tribe's two main concerns, damage to ancestral sites and the potential of water contamination if a leak occurred:

Well, first of all, I think this is well known by now. We're not on any Indian property at all, no Native American property. We're on private lands. That's number one. Number two, this pipeline is new steel pipe. We're boring underneath Lake Oahe. It's going to go 90 feet to 150 feet (27.5-45.7 m) below the lake's surface. It's thick wall pipe, extra thick, by the way, more so than just the normal pipe that we lay. Also, on each side of the lake, there's automated valves that, if in the very, very unlikely situation there were to be a leak, our control room shuts down the pipe, encapsulates that small section that could be in peril. So, that's just not going to happen. Number one, we're not going to have a leak. I can't promise that, of course, but that — no one would get on airplanes if they thought they were going to crash. And, number two, there is no way there would be any crude contaminate their water supply. They're 70 miles (110 km) downstream.

On December 4, the Army announced that it would not grant an easement for the pipeline to be drilled under Lake Oahe. The announcement was made by the Assistant Secretary of the Army (Civil Works), Jo-Ellen Darcy:

Although we have had continuing discussion and exchanges of new information with the Standing Rock Sioux and Dakota Access, it's clear that there's more work to do. The best way to complete that work responsibly and expeditiously is to explore alternate routes for the pipeline crossing.

Energy Transfer Partners and Sunoco Logistics Partners issued a same-day response:

The White House's directive today to the Corps for further delay is just the latest in a series of overt and transparent political actions by an administration which has abandoned the rule of law in favor of currying favor with a narrow and extreme political constituency. As stated all along, ETP and SXL fully expect to complete construction of the pipeline without any additional rerouting in and around Lake Oahe. Nothing this Administration has done today changes that in any way.

=== Continuation of construction ===
On January 24, 2017, newly elected President Donald Trump signed an executive order allowing the pipeline's construction to proceed. On February 8, 2017, the U.S. Army Corps of Engineers (USACE) granted Dakota Access, LLC an easement based on the Mineral Leasing Act to cross Lake Oahe and finish construction of the pipeline. On February 9, 2017, the Cheyenne River Sioux Tribe filed a motion for a restraining order citing Religious Freedom Restoration Act violations, claiming an oil spill would disrupt their ability to worship freely. This preliminary injunction was rejected on March 7, 2017. On February 14, 2017, the Standing Rock Sioux Tribe and the Cheyenne River Sioux Tribe filed a motion for summary judgment. The motion asked the Court to rule on unresolved legal questions concerning USACE, including the meeting of National Environmental Policy Act (NEPA) requirements and the violation of Tribal treaty rights. The motion addressed three claims: 1) the lawful requirement of a full, transparent and public environmental review for any federal action that has "significant" environmental effects, 2) Tribal treaty rights that guarantee the integrity of their reservation, and 3) the reversal of decisions from the previous administration.

=== Federal Court finds the environmental study inadequate ===
On June 14, 2017, Federal Judge James Boasberg issued his third opinion in the matter, ruling that the Corps permits authorizing the pipeline to cross the Missouri River "substantially complied with NEPA in many areas" but did not adequately consider certain aspects of the law. In a ninety-one page decision to remand the matter to the Corps for supplementation of the record, Judge Boasberg wrote, "the Court agrees that [the Corps] did not adequately consider the impacts of an oil spill on fishing rights, hunting rights, or environmental justice, or the degree to which the pipeline's effects are likely to be highly controversial". Boasberg's decision came just weeks after crude oil had started pumping through the pipeline. Judge Boasberg asked the parties to submit legal briefs on the question of whether the Court should shut down the pipeline pending the completion of a lawful environmental review.

On August 7, 2017, the Standing Rock Sioux Tribe and the Cheyenne River Sioux Tribe filed a legal brief arguing in favor of pipeline shutdown during the environmental review process. The Tribes received support from law professors and practitioners, tribes and tribal organizations, and other amicus parties. The Court granted the Tribes' motion for summary judgment for three reasons. First, the Court held that the U.S. Army Corps of Engineers failed to address expert critiques of Dakota Access, LLC's oil spill risk analysis. Second, the Court found fault in USACE's disregard of impacts an oil spill would have on the Tribes' treaty rights to fish and hunt. Finally, the Court found that USACE conducted a skewed assessment that reached the conclusion that the selected site raised no environmental justice concerns. Under the Court's order, USACE will reassess these questions and come to a new decision on if a full environmental impact statement is required.

On October 11, 2017, the Court ruled that DAPL could continue to operate while USACE reassessed the environmental impact of the pipeline. While the Court did not find that shutting down the pipeline would cause a major economic disruption as claimed by DAPL, they refused to shut the pipeline down during the impact study due to the possibility that USACE would be able to justify its decision to not do a full environmental review. USACE predicts that the review will be finished by April 2018. Following the Court's finding a statement was issued by Earthjustice Attorney Jan Hasselman, who is representing the Tribe.

Today's decision is a disappointing continuation of a historic pattern: other people get all the profits, and the Tribes get all the risk and harm. The court already found that the Corps violated the law when it issued the permits without thoroughly considering the impact on the people of Standing Rock. The company should not be allowed to continue operating while the Corps studies that threat.,

In March 2020, a United States District Judge ruled that the government had not adequately studied the pipeline's "effects on the quality of the human environment", and ordered the United States Army Corps of Engineers to conduct a new environmental impact review. In July 2020, a District Court judge issued a ruling for the pipeline to be shut down and emptied of oil pending a new environmental review. The temporary shutdown order was overturned by a U.S. appeals court on August 5, though the environmental review was ordered to continue. The pipeline continues to operate.

The tribe sued and in March 2020 a federal judge sided with the tribe and ordered USACE to do a full environmental impact statement. In a 42-page decision Judge James Boasberg said the environmental analysis by both the companies behind the pipeline and the Corps was severely lacking. “In projects of this scope, it is not difficult for an opponent to find fault with many conclusions made by an operator and relied on by the agency, but here, there is considerably more than a few isolated comments raising insubstantial concerns. The many commenters in this case pointed to serious gaps in crucial parts of the Corps’ analysis — to name a few, that the pipeline's leak-detection system was unlikely to work, that it was not designed to catch slow spills, that the operator's serious history of incidents had not been taken into account, and that the worst-case scenario used by the Corps was potentially only a fraction of what a realistic figure would be."

In July 2020, saying federal officials failed to carry out a complete analysis of its environmental impacts, U.S. District Judge James Boasberg ruled that the pipeline must be shut down by August 5 and remain shutdown while the Army Corps of Engineers conducts a more extensive environmental review than the one done that allowed the pipeline to begin transporting oil three years previously. Pipeline owner Energy Transfer said they would appeal. On August 5, the Court of Appeals sided with Energy Transfer to allow the pipeline to stay open, saying the lower-court judge "did not make the findings necessary for injunctive relief." However the appellate court did not grant Energy Transfer's motion to block the review, saying the company had "failed to make a strong showing of likely success."

As of May 2021, the pipeline was granted legal permission to restart operations, on the grounds that the Standing Rock legal team had fail to demonstrate to the court "likelihood of irreparable injury" from continued operation of the pipeline. Later, in July 2021, Boasberg ruled against the lawsuit filed by Standing Rock team against the operation of the pipeline. Despite ruling against the federal judge laid out how the Standing Rock Tribe might continue to challenge the ongoing environmental review. Boasberg also left the possibility of reopening the lawsuit if any of his previous rulings from the past five years were violated by the Corps or Energy Transfer.

=== Safety measures imposed ===
On December 4, 2017, following a 200,000 gallon Keystone pipeline oil spill in November 2017, Judge Boasberg imposed several interim measures over the ongoing operation of the Dakota Access pipeline. The Court ordered three measures, which had been requested by the Tribe. According to a report published by Earthjustice, a non-profit public interest law organization dedicated to environmental issues:

The Court ordered the Corps and DAPL to work with the Tribes to complete oil spill response plans at Lake Oahe. Up to now, the Tribe has been kept in the dark about spill response planning and was not involved in the process of developing plans to address spills at Lake Oahe. Second, the Court ordered an independent audit of DAPL's compliance with the permit conditions and standards. The Tribe has to be involved in the selection of an auditor. Finally, DAPL must file regular reports on any incidents or repairs on the pipeline. Such reporting is not currently required by law, which means the public does not learn about the nearly constant spills and leaks of oil that occur on major pipelines.

The conditions were all opposed by the Corps and by DAPL.

=== Arrests and prosecutions ===
Federal prosecutors brought indictments against at least five Indigenous activists from the protests. Dion Ortiz, James "Angry Bird" White, Michael "Little Feather" Giron, and Michael "Rattler" Markus were all convicted of one count of civil disorder. Red Fawn Fallis was convicted of civil disorder and illegal possession of a gun by a convicted felon. The gun which she was convicted for possessing went off as she was being "tackled by police officers, who were attempting to put her in handcuffs [when] three gunshots allegedly went off alongside her. No one was injured in the shooting incident." She was given the largest sentencing of any protester at the time, having to be held in federal prison for four years and nine months. The judge who heard Red Fawn's case did not allow her defence team to cite her treaty rights or "other issues related to her arrest at anti-pipeline protests near the Standing Rock Sioux's Tribe's reservation border." In effect, Red Fawn accepted a plea deal as she believed that in withholding such important evidence, she would not have received a fair trial.

James "Angry Bird" White was sentenced to serve twenty-four months of probation. The other five protesters were incarcerated in federal prison, Ortiz for 16 months, Giron and Markus for 36 months, and Fallis for 57 months. Many other activists argued that their incarceration was used to suppress Indigenous opposition to the pipeline, stating that "[they are] political prisoners …We were protecting our land. It’s something we have to do, and we’re going to be met with this violence from these agencies, from the federal government, from the state.”

On August 11–12, 18 more people were arrested, including Standing Rock Tribal Chairman David Archambault II who was charged with disorderly conduct. Along with the tribal council, Archambault had sued the Army Corps of Engineers days before his arrest. He was himself sued on August 16 by Dakota Access, LLC, which sought "restraining orders and unspecified monetary damages."

In 2019, Jessica Reznicek and Ruby Montoya were indicted on nine federal criminal charges, including setting 11 fires during the protests. The two set fire to machinery and tools and then used a torch to pierce the metal piping and valves. On June 30, 2021, Reznicek was sentenced to eight years in federal prison for a single count of damaging an energy facility. The remaining charges were dismissed.

On September 7 an arrest warrant was also issued in Morton County for Green Party presidential candidate Jill Stein and her running mate Ajamu Baraka on misdemeanor counts of criminal trespass and criminal mischief. Stein had spray-painted "I approve this message" and Baraka wrote the word "decolonize" on a bulldozer.

A warrant for journalist Amy Goodman's arrest was issued by Morton County on September 8. She was charged with criminal trespass related to the filming done on September 3. The prosecutor, Ladd Erickson, said Goodman was like a protester because she was only giving time to the protesters' side of the story. In response to praise from Erickson, Matt Taibbi wrote, "a prosecutor who arrests a reporter because he doesn't think she's 'balanced' enough is basically telling future reporters what needs to be in their stories to avoid arrest. This is totally improper and un-American."

On October 1, Canadian journalist Ed Ou, on assignment with the Canadian Broadcasting Corporation to cover the protests, was detained at the US border for six hours, with his cell phones and other electronic media confiscated. Ou was eventually denied entry to the US without explanation. The American Civil Liberties Union requested that any data collected from Ou's electronic devices be destroyed and that he be given assurance that he would not be harassed again.

Speaking on October 5, Standing Rock Tribal Chairman David Archambault II said that as of that date 135 anti-pipeline demonstrators had been arrested. Archambault also said that law enforcement officers were "heightening the danger" by using anti-riot gear. Saying, "Confronting men, women, and children while outfitted in gear more suited for the battlefield is a disproportionate response", Amnesty International also expressed concern about the militant response to the protesters.

On October 12, filmmaker Deia Schlosberg was arrested and faced 45 years of conspiracy charges. The charges were dropped a few weeks later.

On October 13, Goodman announced her intention to turn herself in to the Morton County–Mandan Corrections Center on Monday, October 17, to face misdemeanor riot charges. (Though she had originally been charged with criminal trespass, the prosecutor said that there were "legal issues with proving the notice of trespassing requirements in the statute.") She stated that she would be fighting the charges against her as a First Amendment violation. The Committee to Protect Journalists, the North Dakota Newspaper Association, the American Civil Liberties Union in North Dakota, and the Freedom of the Press Foundation all expressed concern over the developing challenge to freedom of the press.

On October 17, District Judge John Grinsteiner did not find probable cause for multiple riot charges, including the one brought against Goodman. Following the judge's decision, Kirchmeier reasserted that trespassing would lead to arrest, while the state prosecutor said that the investigation would remain open pending new evidence.

According to the Morton County Sheriff's Department, 94% of protesters arrested were from out of state. According to the Water Protector Legal Collective over 800 state criminal cases were brought by North Dakota prosecutors. Of these nearly 400 resulted in dismissals of charges, 42 ended in not-guilty verdicts at trial, nearly 200 were subjected to pre-trial diversion, and just 26 cases ended in convictions after trials. There are still 42 open cases before the state court.

=== EnergyTransfer vs Greenpeace USA Lawsuit ===
In 2019 a federal court in North Dakota dismissed as unfounded a racketeering and defamation lawsuit filed by Energy Transfer Partners LP, the builder of the 1,000-mile Dakota Access Pipeline, against Greenpeace USA, EarthFirst and BankTrack for their pipeline protests. The lawsuit alleged Greenpeace USA misled the public with false claims about the Standing Rock Sioux tribes' sacred sites and the likelihood the pipeline would contaminate the Missouri River in North Dakota. In contrast, a 2018 Greenpeace report said Energy Transfer pipelines and those owned by the company's subsidiaries "spilled over 500 times in the last decade."

In 2025, a North Dakota jury ordered Greenpeace USA and affiliated entities—including Greenpeace Fund and Greenpeace International—to pay $666.8 million in damages to pipeline developer Energy Transfer, following a lawsuit related to the 2016–2017 Dakota Access Pipeline protests near the Standing Rock Sioux Reservation.

Greenpeace was found liable for defamation, trespass, nuisance, and civil conspiracy after the jury concluded the organization had supported and encouraged disruptive and, at times, violent demonstrations that delayed construction and harmed Energy Transfer’s business relationships. Greenpeace USA and Greenpeace Fund were held responsible for $535 million of the total damages.

Evidence presented during the trial included allegations that Greenpeace provided funding, equipment, and logistical support to activists at the protest site. Greenpeace has appealed the verdict, describing the case as a Strategic Lawsuit Against Public Participation (SLAPP) and a threat to free speech and environmental advocacy.

On February 27, 2026, Judge James Gion in North Dakota finalized the amount of damages at $345 million. Greenpeace had also filed a lawsuit against Energy Transfer in the Netherlands under a law designed to prevent lawsuits aimed at harassing or silencing activists.

== National opposition to the pipeline ==
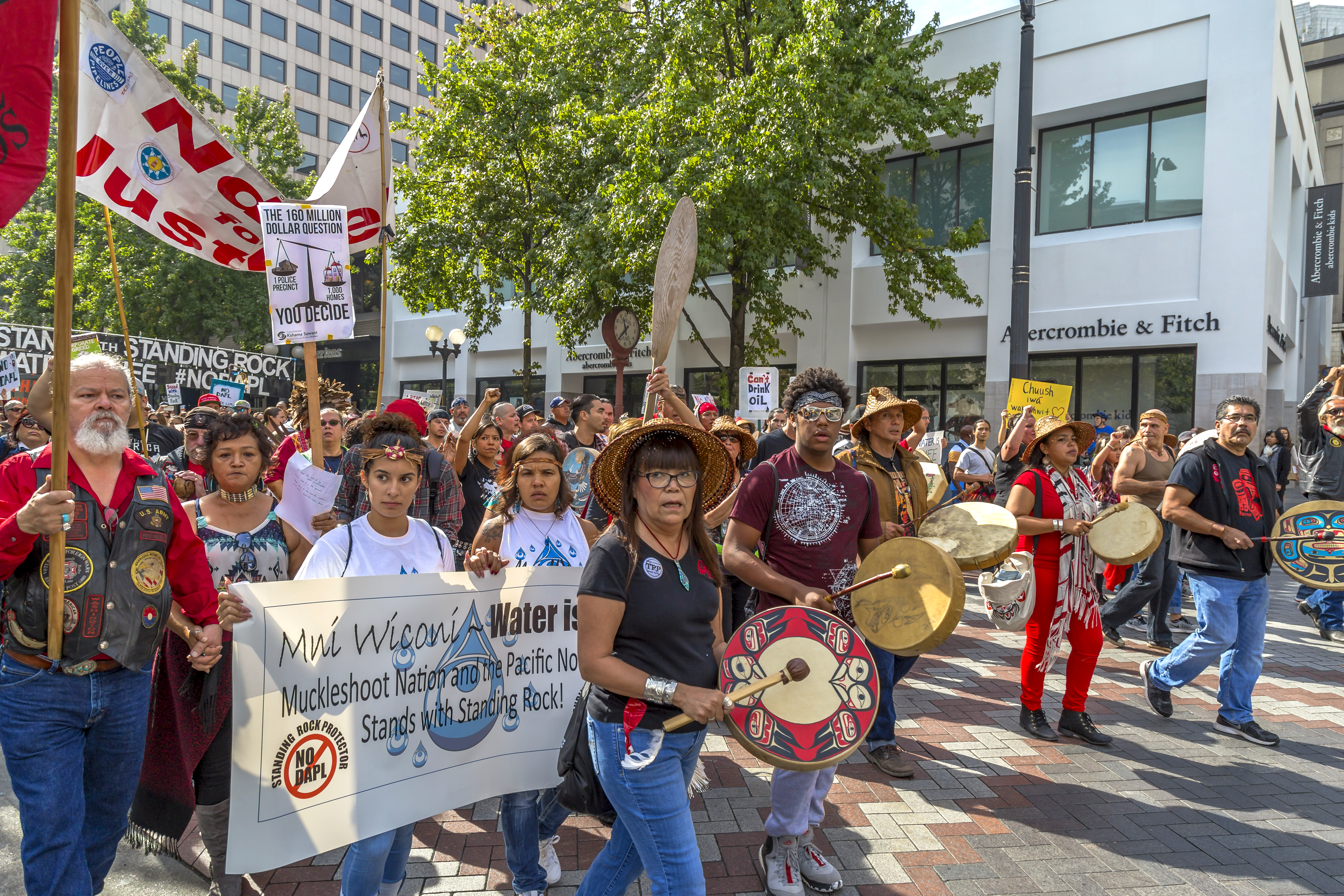
Seattle Stands with Standing Rock! - peaceful march and rally held in Seattle in September 2016. Indigenous drummers, activists from numerous Native nations, and diverse supporters march in solidarity.

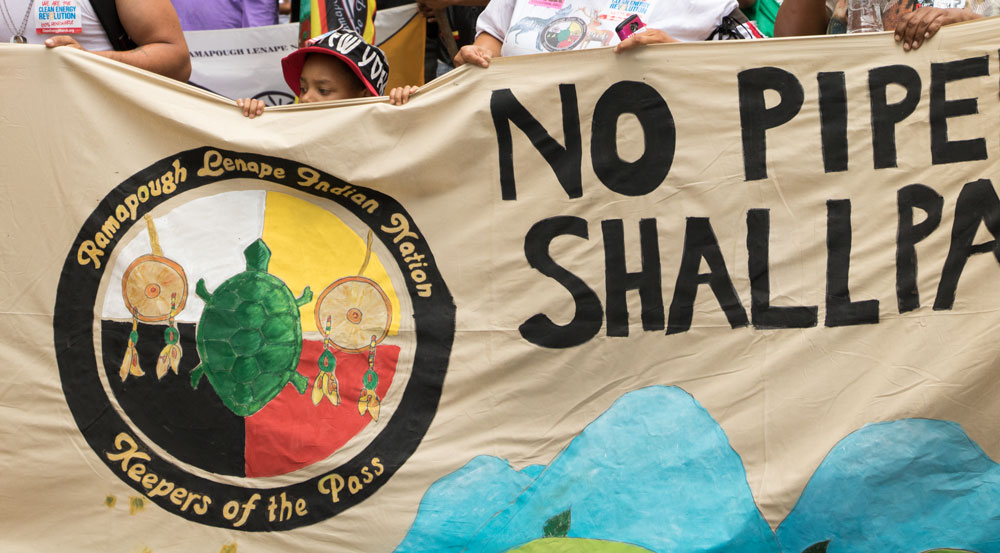
Dakota Access Pipeline protestors at March for a Clean Energy Revolution, Philadelphia, July 2016

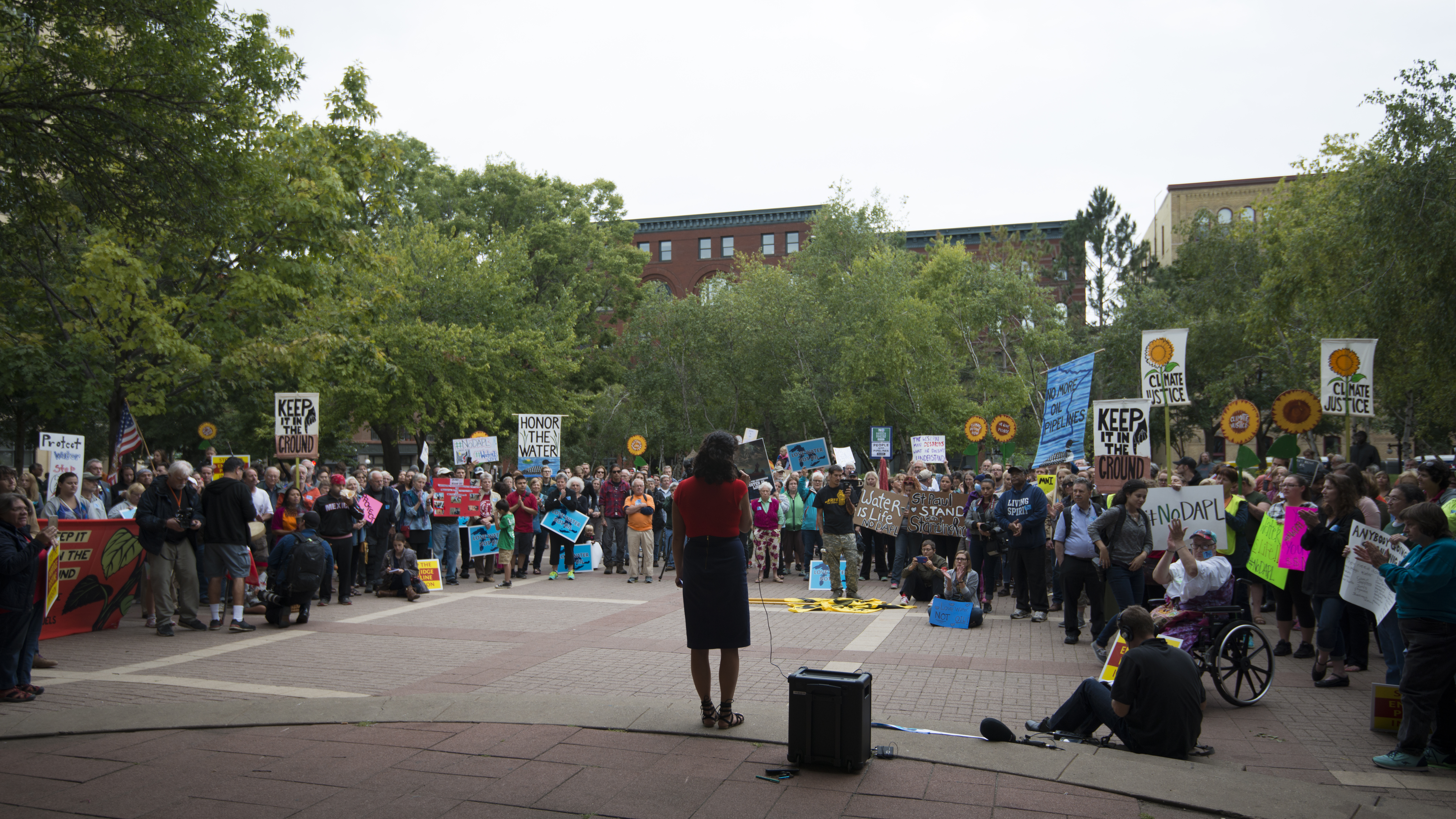
Solidarity rally in Saint Paul, Minnesota, September 2016.

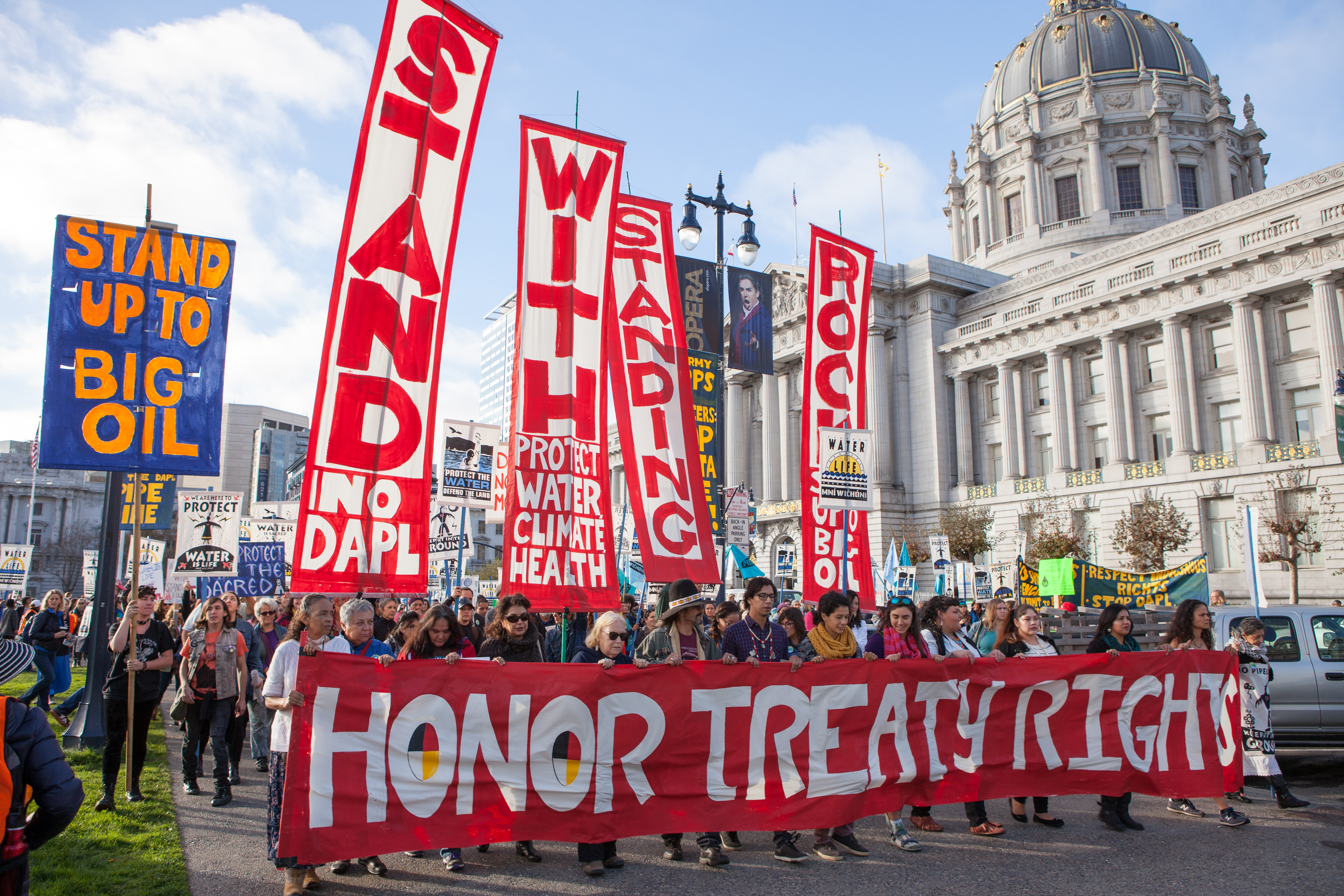
Standing Rock solidarity march in San Francisco, November 2016.

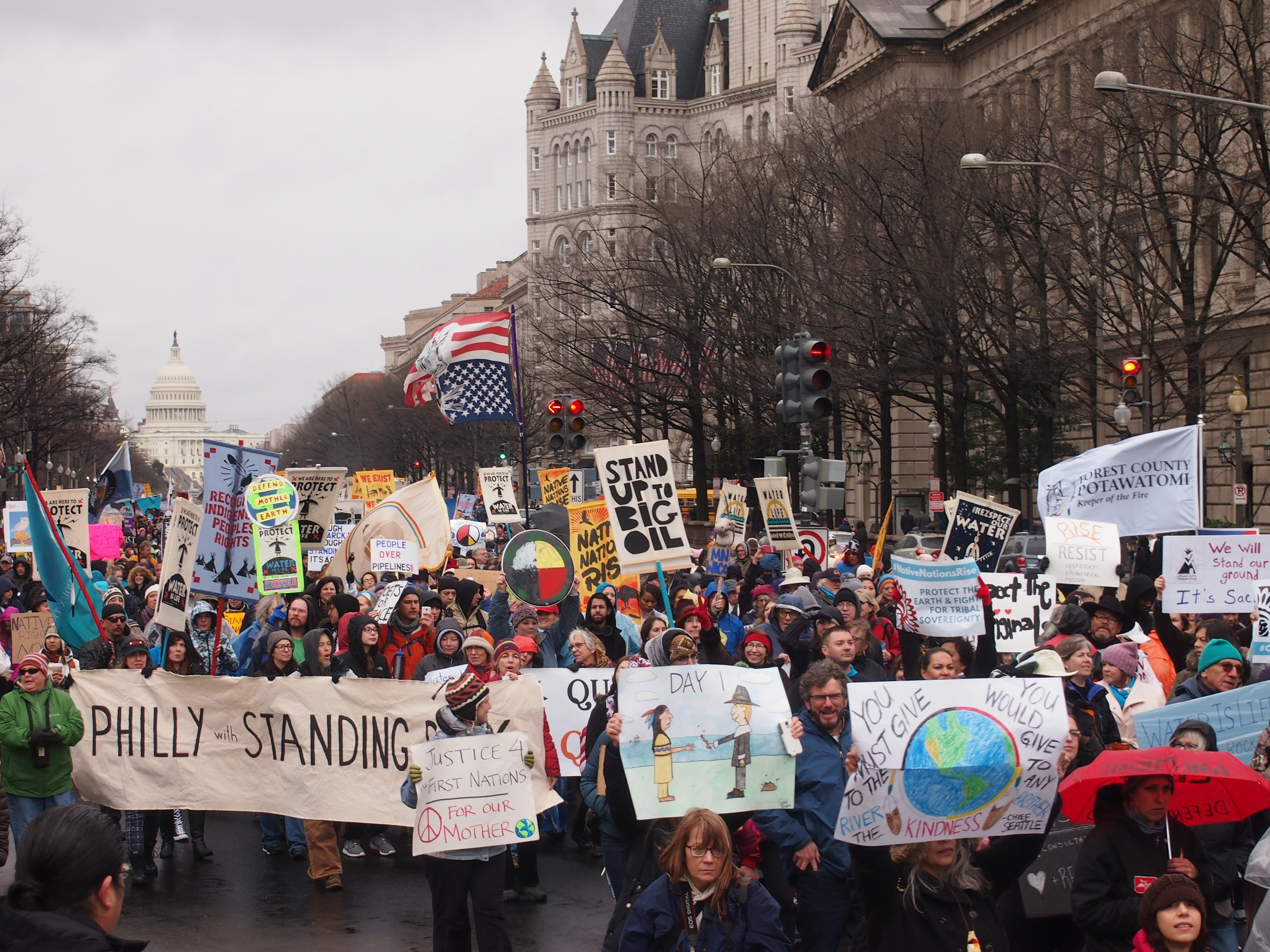
Native Nations Rise march in Washington D.C., March 2017.

Many Sioux Tribes passed resolutions in support of Standing Rock, including the Cheyenne River Sioux Tribe, Crow Creek Tribe, the Oglala Sioux Tribe, and the Rosebud Sioux Tribe. Oklahoma tribes also expressed support for the pipeline protest movement. In August, Principal Chief Bill John Baker of the Cherokee Nation said, "As Indian people, we have a right to protect our lands and protect our water rights. That's our responsibility to the next seven generations."

Field reporter Jordan Chariton (of The Young Turks' on-the-road program TYT Politics) was one of the most active journalists participating in the protests. He commented on the scant presence of journalists from mainstream networks such as CNN and MSNBC.

=== North Dakota wins judgment against federal government ===
North Dakota sued the federal government, alleging that the protests were unlawful and that the Obama administration encouraged them. North Dakota sued for the costs of policing the protest and environmental and property damage. On April 23, 2025, federal judge Daniel Traynor ruled that the federal government had to pay the state of North Dakota nearly $28 million in damages over the protest, specifically calling out the United States Army Corps of Engineers for "negligence."

=== Indigenous youth groups ===
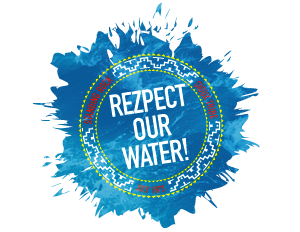
ReZpect Our Water – logo of the water runners, youth who ran from Standing Rock to Washington DC to protest the Dakota Access Pipeline in the summer of 2016

ReZpect Our Water is an Indigenous youth group that formed to oppose the pipeline. They have been very active in raising public awareness through social media, petitions, teach-ins, rallies, and videos. In May 2016, 13-year-old Anna Lee Rain Yellowhammer and thirty young people launched a petition that opposed the pipeline. It quickly gathered over 80,000 signatures, including celebrity endorsements such as Leonardo DiCaprio and Cameron Russell.

In April 2016, ReZpect Our Water organized a 2,000 mile cross-country "spiritual run" from North Dakota to Washington, D.C., to protest the construction of the pipeline. Upon the groups arrival they delivered a petition with 160,000 signatures to the U.S. Army Corps of Engineers.

In December, 2016, Activist Naomi Klein interviewed ReZpect Our Water/Standing Rock Youth organizer Tokata Iron Eyes; she posted a Facebook video of the interview which gained more than a million views in 24 hours.

The International Indigenous Youth Council has also been active in protests against the pipeline and advocacy for Native American needs. The group was founded by Jasilyn Charger (Cheyenne River Sioux of Eagle Butte, South Dakota). Tara Houska (Ojibwe, Couchiching First Nation of International Falls, Minnesota), national campaigns director of Honor the Earth, has actively helped to explain the protest aims. Eryn Wise (Jicarilla Apache and Laguna tribes), Council communications director, hopes to relate history from the Indigenous people's point of view: "We don't ever hear the narrative of indigenous people. We hear people writing our narratives for us."

=== Acts of solidarity in U.S. cities ===
On September 8, about 500 Native Americans and other protesters marched in Denver to show solidarity with the Standing Rock Americans. State Representative Joe Salazar spoke about the safety of pipelines and described a recent Colorado Oil and Gas Association statement on oil pipeline safety as "full of lies."

On September 16, a rally and march was held in Seattle to show solidarity with the Standing Rock Sioux Tribe. The mayor of Seattle and city council members joined leaders from Northwest tribes from Quinualt, Makah, Lummi, Suquamish, Tulalip, Swinomish, Puyallup and others to show opposition to the pipeline. Fawn Sharp, president of the Quinault Indian Nation and the Affiliated Tribes of Northwest Indians, said that while the tribes are "determined to win this fight", a "deeper fix" is needed. "The U.S. must recognize that we have political equality. This is much larger than a specific infrastructure project. It goes to the fundamental relationship."

According to the Grand Forks Herald, on October 13 the governments of 19 cities, including St. Louis and Minneapolis, had passed ordinances to support the Standing Rock tribe in opposition of the pipeline.

In October, the Morton County Sheriff requested police from surrounding areas to assist in regulating the protests near the pipeline. The Dane County Sheriff's office of Wisconsin sent 10 deputies to aid the local police, but they were recalled a few days later because of opposition from the Dane County residents and county officials.

On November 15, hundreds of cities held protests against the pipeline in a coordinated protest which organizers called a "National Day of Action." Hundreds of protesters gathered peacefully in Chicago, Los Angeles, Manhattan, Denver, and other cities; dozens of protesters were arrested, including demonstrators in Mandan, North Dakota, where protesters were arrested after blocking a railroad.

Tara Houska, Director for Honor the Earth, spoke at a rally in New York City saying, "Because of the power of social media and the millions of those at Standing Rock, the Army Corps are going to invite the tribe in to discuss their concerns." Senator Bernie Sanders spoke at a protest in front of the White House. Robert Kennedy Jr. visited the protest camp and spoke to the protesters. He commented on the PBS Newshour: "I think they have a lot of courage. I think they're standing up for America, that they're standing up in the face of a bully."

Thanksgiving Day has been described as a reminder of the strained relationship between the U.S. government and native people. On the November 24 holiday, several thousand continued to protest the pipeline; some estimated that the number of protesters, which fluctuates, doubled that day. Hundreds of people joined the protest that day, including groups from California, Oregon, Wisconsin, Colorado, South Carolina, and Washington.

Protesters built a floating bridge to Turtle Island, considered sacred ground, and 400 gathered near the bridge, some crossing over to perform a prayer ceremony.

The influx of many new people over Thanksgiving weekend caused new problems, according to some activists. Some criticized a group of young, mostly white, people at the protest for treating it like a festival such as Burning Man by bringing drugs and alcohol, requiring supplies and provisions rather than sustaining themselves, or performing unsolicited live music.

Actress Jane Fonda was one of a delegation of 50 people who served a Thanksgiving dinner in nearby Mandan, capturing media attention. Business owners traveled from as far as Massachusetts and Pennsylvania to serve food to protesters at Standing Rock.

A Thanksgiving Day protest in Portland, Oregon drew about 350 in heavy rain.

In February 2017, Seattle, Washington's city council unanimously voted to not renew its contract with Wells Fargo in a move that cites the bank's role as a lender to the Dakota Access Pipeline project as well as its "creation of millions of bogus accounts" and said the bidding process for its next banking partner would involve "social responsibility." The City Council in Davis, California, took a similar action, voting unanimously to find a new bank to handle its accounts by the end of 2017.

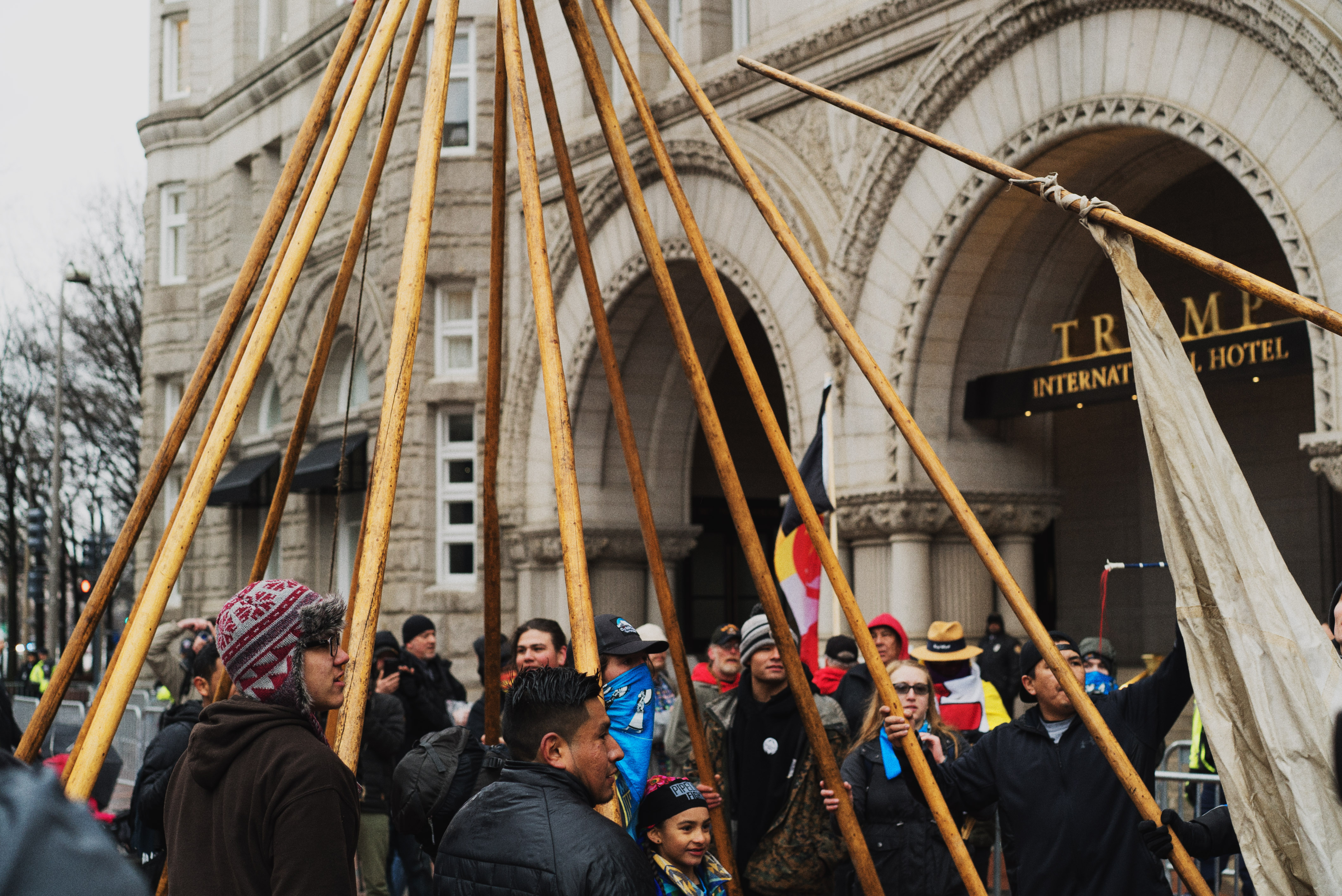
Native Nations March in Washington, DC. 2017

In March 2017, the Standing Rock Sioux tribe led a four-day protest in Washington D.C., culminating in the Native Nations Rise march on March 10. The protesters marched through the capital, pausing to erect a tipi at Trump International Hotel, and rallied in front of the White House.

=== Support from military veterans ===
In November, a group called Veterans Stand for Standing Rock formed to participate in nonviolent intervention to defend the demonstrators from what the group has called "assault and intimidation at the hands of the militarized police force." According to The New York Times, "as many as 2,000 veterans" indicated that they would gather at the Standing Rock Sioux Reservation to serve as "human shields" for protesters. The organizers of these protests included a retired Baltimore police sergeant and Wesley Clark Jr., the son of former Supreme NATO Commander and 2004 presidential candidate Wesley Clark. At the time, Wesley Clark Jr., was affiliated with The Young Turks.

Democratic Representative Tulsi Gabbard supported the protests and travelled to North Dakota in 2016.

Following the executive order made by new U.S. president Trump in January 2017 which overturned the decision of former President Obama to halt the construction of the pipeline and the February order in which he authorized the Army Corps of Engineers to proceed, US veterans returned to Standing Rock to a form human shield to protect Dakota Access pipeline protesters. Air force veteran Elizabeth Williams said, "We are prepared to put our bodies between Native elders and a privatized military force. We've stood in the face of fire before. We feel a responsibility to use the skills we have."

=== #NODAPL ===
Along with the hashtag #NoDAPL, many other hashtags sprang up on Twitter, Facebook, and Instagram to protest the pipeline. The hashtags included #ReZpectOurWater, which is a play on "reservations", #StandWithStandingRock, and #WaterisLife. Activist Naomi Klein posted a Facebook video in which she interviewed 13-year-old water protector, Takota Iron Eyes, which gained more than a million views in 24 hours.

In December 2016, Klein, writing an editorial in The Nation shortly after the Army Corps of Engineers had turned down the permit for the Dakota Access Pipeline to be built under the Missouri River, said, "The Lesson from Standing Rock: Organizing and Resistance Can Win." As a long-standing climate change activist, Klein said that past resistance has brought about change incrementally and only after a delay following mass actions. However, she wrote, Standing Rock had been "different."

However, calling the Army Corps of Engineers request for further study an "incredibly cumbersome, long, horrible permitting process," on January 24, newly elected President Donald Trump signed a presidential memorandum to advance the construction of the pipeline.

=== Indigenized Energy ===
When Dakota Access Pipeline protests began in 2016, then 34 year-old Two Bears was a tribal council member. His community of Cannon Ball hosted one of the encampments until late 2016. A year later, he created an organization named "Indigenized Energy," which aims to bring renewable energy sources to Native communities. In February 2019, the organization's first solar-panel project was completed in Standing Rock. This project is of importance to Two Bears and to many Indigenous communities who claim that The Dakota Access Pipeline protests are what "woke you people up, but we have known for a long time that the colonial capitalism corporate model is attacking this world [...] The energy system dominant across this country is not in line with Native values, and the solution that I came up with is that tribal nations need to create their own energy companies using renewable energy sources." This grassroots solution is following the historic and ongoing citing of polluting industries near Indigenous communities. Meaning, for Two Bears and many others, The Dakota Access Pipeline is not an isolated incident, but rather, it is reflective of the larger citing practices of polluting industries where Native communities have "taken the pollutive brunt of the fossil fuels industry."

== Presidential memorandum by Donald Trump ==
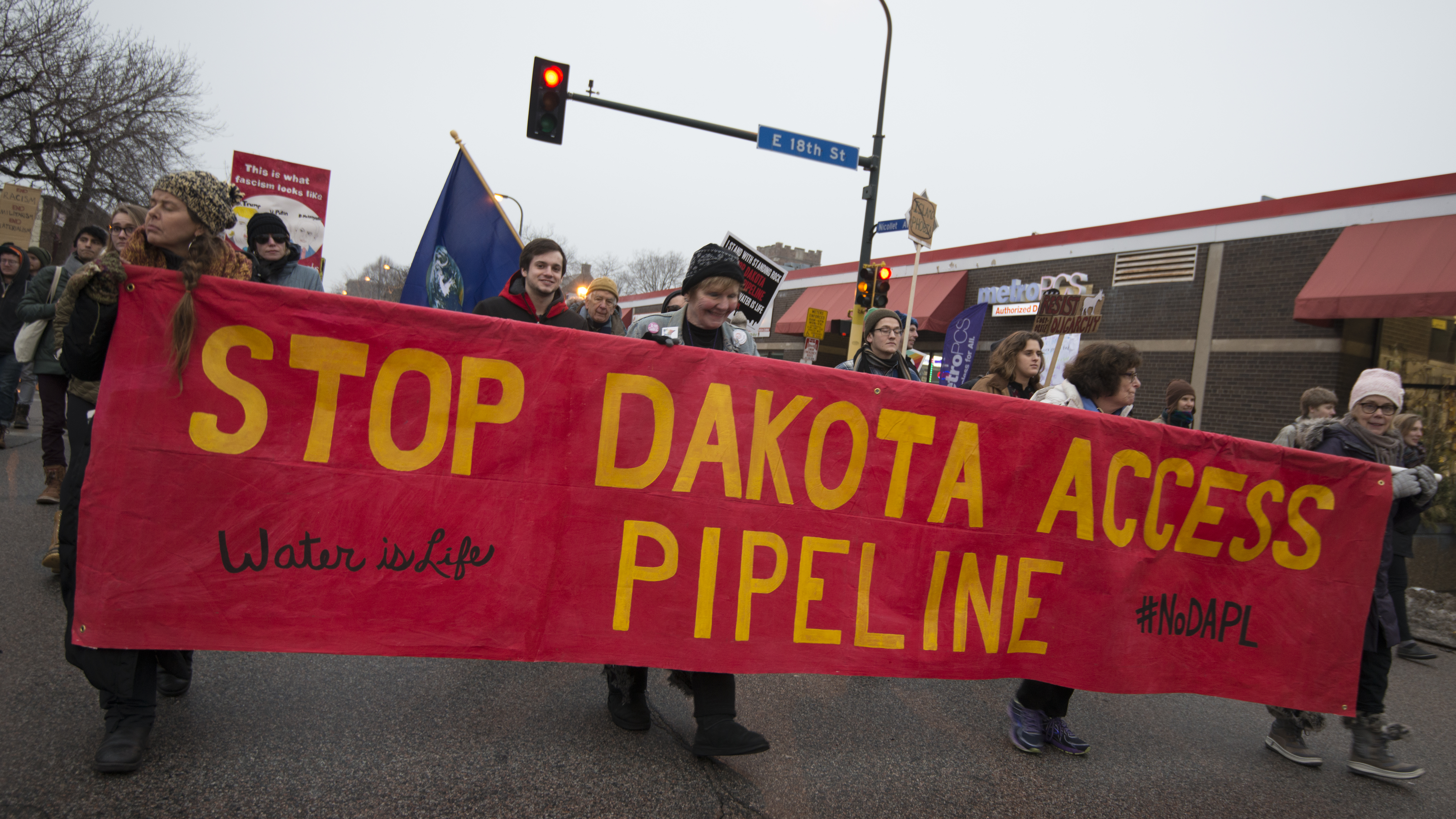
Banner against the pipeline in a 2017 inauguration day protest in Minnesota

In December 2016, while still directed by the Obama administration, the Army Corps of Engineers decided that further study to address tribal concerns was needed and launched a study on January 18, 2017. But on January 24, newly elected President Donald Trump signed a presidential memorandum to advance the construction of the pipeline under "terms and conditions to be negotiated". The order would expedite the environmental review that Trump described as an "incredibly cumbersome, long, horrible permitting process."

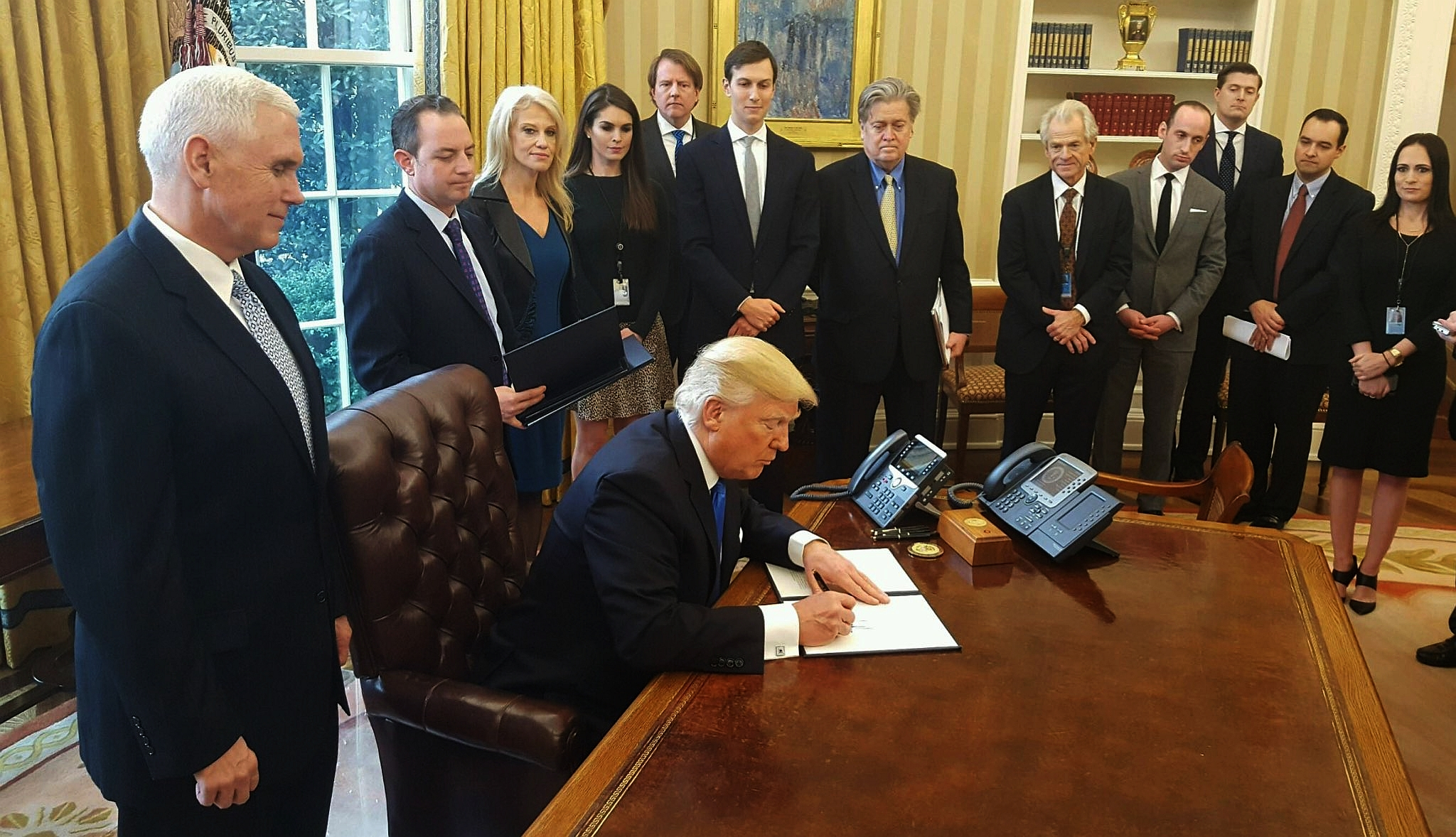
Trump signing the Presidential memorandum to advance the construction of the Keystone XL and Dakota Access pipelines. January 24, 2017

On February 7, 2017, Trump authorized the Army Corps of Engineers to proceed, ending its environmental impact assessment and the associated public comment period. The director of the Indigenous Environmental Network released a statement saying: "The granting of an easement, without any environmental review or tribal consultation, is not the end of this fight—it is the new beginning. Expect mass resistance far beyond what Trump has seen so far. ... Our tribal nations and Indigenous grassroots peoples on the front lines have had no input on this process." Standing Rock chairman David Archambault II said, "We are not opposed to energy independence. We are opposed to reckless and politically motivated development projects, like DAPL, that ignore our treaty rights and risk our water. Creating a second Flint does not make America great again." Appearing as a guest on The Late Show with Stephen Colbert on February 12, actress and activist Shailene Woodley said that, rather than gather at the Dakota protest site, the best way to oppose the pipeline may be to boycott banks that fund it and to take part in local protests.

== Reactions ==
Continued conflicts and resulting attention on social media led to increasing national and global support for the protests. High-profile activists, celebrities, and politicians spoke out in support of the tribe, including senator Bernie Sanders, and presidential candidate Jill Stein. Standing Rock Chairman David Archambault II addressed the tribe's positions at the UN Human Rights Council in Geneva, Switzerland. In December 2016, under President Barack Obama's administration, the Corps of Engineers denied an easement for construction of the pipeline under the Missouri River, though this decision was reversed the following month by the incoming administration of President Donald Trump. The pipeline was completed by April 2017, and its first oil was delivered on May 14.

In September 2016, Senator Bernie Sanders spoke to a crowd of about 3,000 members of the Standing Rock Sioux Tribe and other tribal nations and supporters at a protest held outside of the White House. Saying "the pipeline threatens the environment and water resources and exploits Native Americans", he asked President Obama to take action and conduct a full environmental and cultural impact analysis of the project, which he believed would kill the pipeline. Following the use of the National Guard and police in riot gear to remove protesters from a protest camp in October, Sanders again called on the president to suspend construction of the pipeline. In a letter to the President, Sanders said in part: "It is deeply distressing to me that the federal government is putting the profits of the oil industry ahead of the treaty and sovereign rights of Native American communities. Mr. President, you took a bold and principled stand against the Keystone Pipeline – I ask you to take a similar stand against the Dakota Access Pipeline."

Saying that the Dakota Access pipeline project is part of a "long history of pushing the impacts of pollution onto the most economically and politically disadvantaged people and communities across this country", Representative Raúl Grijalva, the ranking Democrat on the House Natural Resources Committee, on September 22 asked the Army Corps of Engineers to withdraw the existing permits for the pipeline.

Saying "the project's current permits should be suspended and all construction stopped until a complete environmental and cultural review has been completed for the entire project", Senators Sanders, Dianne Feinstein, Ed Markey, Patrick Leahy and Benjamin Cardin on October 13 called on President Barack Obama to order a comprehensive environmental review of the pipeline project. They also requested stronger tribal consultation for the contested part of the route.

Calling the proposed pipeline route "the ripest case of environmental racism I have seen in a long time", on October 26 the Reverend Jesse Jackson announced support for the movement, saying, "The tribes of this country have sacrificed a lot so this great country could be built. With promises broken, land stolen and sacred lands desecrated, the Standing Rock Sioux Tribe is standing up for their right to clean water. They have lost land for settlers to farm, more land for gold in the Black Hills, and then again, even more, land for the dam that was built for hydropower. When will the taking stop?"

In September, Obama spoke to tribal representatives, saying, "I know that many of you have come together across tribes and across the country to support the community at Standing Rock. And together, you're making your voices heard." He again discussed the protest movement on November 2 saying that "we're going to let it play out for several more weeks and determine whether or not this can be resolved in a way that I think is properly attentive to the traditions of First Americans."

In an October 28, 2016 public statement, Chief Arvol Looking Horse, spiritual leader and Keeper of the Sacred Pipe Bundle of the Lakota/Dakota/Nakota Nations, invoked his role as the voice of traditional government of the Great Sioux Nation and called upon President Barack Obama to communicate "nation to nation, as indicated by our treaties."

Several members of the U.S. Senate and House of Representatives weighed in on the protest on November 29, 2016. Senators Al Franken of Minnesota and Cory Booker of New Jersey called upon U.S. Attorney General Loretta Lynch to investigate the tactics of law enforcement officers against peaceful protesters, and to send monitors to track any violence against protesters. Several members of the House made statements as well, and Representative Tulsi Gabbard of Hawaii announced plans to join hundreds of other military veterans in protecting the protesters in early December.

Native American lacrosse players Lyle Thompson and his brothers Miles, Jeremy and Hiana and others including Bill O'Brien and Scott Marr, used social media to support the protesters. They visited the camp as well, bringing lacrosse sticks and organizing games, giving instructions to those who had never before played the game. Following the Trump administration's January 2017 reversal of the Court decisions made under the Obama administration, the players said that they planned to continue with their support.

Following her unexpected win in the 2018 New York Democratic primary race, Alexandria Ocasio-Cortez credited the time she spent at the protest camp as the reason for her decision run for political office. In an interview she recalled her visit to Standing Rock as a tipping point, saying that she had previously felt that the only way to effectively run for office was if you had access to wealth, social influence, and power. But her visit to North Dakota, where she saw others "putting their whole lives and everything that they had on the line for the protection of their community," inspired her to begin to work within her own community.

The media did not report on the Dakota Access Pipeline protests until about five months after it had started happening and gaining attention on social media (they started reporting in August 2016). Some argue that this shows the media is indifferent toward Native Americans. And what they did report included stereotypes about Native Americans, describing teepees and speaking of poverty and alcoholism.

== Legacy ==
The protests became a model and important foundation for subsequent environmental protests for pipelines in the United States.

== See also ==
- Awake: A Dream From Standing Rock
- Declaration on the Rights of Indigenous Peoples
- Line 3 pipeline
- Stop Line 3 protests
- Hindmarsh Island bridge controversy
- Indigenous land rights
- Idle No More
- List of oil spills
- List of pipeline accidents in the United States in the 21st century
- List of U.S.–Native American treaties
- List of oil pipelines in North America
- List of incidents of civil unrest in the United States
- Water protectors
