= David Archambault II =

Tribal Chairman of the Standing Rock Indian Reservation in North Dakota

David Archambault II (Lakota: Tokala Ohitika) is a Sioux politician who served as tribal chairman of the Standing Rock Indian Reservation in North Dakota from 2013 to 2017. He was instrumental in the Dakota Access Pipeline protests and continues to work to promote an understanding of the historical treaty rights and indigenous rights of Native American people. Archambault holds degrees in Business Administration and Management. In 2017 he joined FirstNation HealthCare as its chief consulting officer.

== Early life and education ==
David Archambault II was born in Denver, Colorado, to parents Betty Archambault (maternal grandparents: Francine Brewer and Willard Yellow Wood Nelson) and David Archambault Sr. (paternal grandparents: Lillian Halsey and Leo Archambault). His mother is a teacher at the Standing Rock Community School and his father was an educator and one of the early leaders in the tribal colleges and universities movement.

Archambault grew up with his family on the Pine Ridge Indian Reservation and attended the Little Wound School in Kyle, South Dakota. Archambault says he spent a lot of time with his grandfather while growing up and learned to hunt, fish, cut wood, work in the garden, and ride horses. Recalling his youth, he relays that his grandmother told him that she was forcibly taken from her parents to attend a boarding school and beaten for speaking her native language. Youths were threatened with jail if they were caught practicing their religion. His uncles were involved in the grassroots American Indian Movement and were attacked by the FBI. Archambault remembers his grandfather and his wife's father for their abilities to "tell stories". He says, "A lot of the things I do today are things that I learned from my grandpa Willard and my father-in-law John Thunder Hawk."

Archambault attended Standing Rock Community College (now Sitting Bull College), Bismarck State College, and earned a bachelor's degree in Business Administration from North Dakota State University. He earned a master's degree in Management from the University of Mary.

== Standing Rock Tribal Council ==
Archambault was elected as Chairman of the Standing Rock Tribal Council in September 2013, defeating Mike Faith and replacing Charles Murphy, who had been chair for many of the previous thirty years. In 2017, he was defeated by Mike Faith.

Archambault has frequently spoken on behalf of the Standing Rock Tribe and allied people's protests against the Dakota Access Pipeline and other Indian rights issues. He has spoken about indigenous rights before Congress and the United Nations Human Rights Council.

In 2014 Archambault and his wife Nicole met President Barack Obama when he attended a Flag Day at the Standing Rock Sioux Reservation. Archambault praised Obama for helping to correct "historic wrongs" involving tribal land disputes saying, "Sitting Bull once asked the government in Washington to send him an honest man. If Sitting Bull were sitting here today, he'd be honored."

== Pipeline resistance movement ==
Archambault was instrumental in protesting against the Dakota Access Pipeline and setting up resistance camps on land adjacent to the Standing Rock reservation. In August 2016, he was arrested, charged with disorderly conduct and strip searched when he crossed a "no trespassing" sign while protesting. In defense of tribal sovereignty, Archambault spoke with numerous journalists, providing information about the history of the movement and the history of treaty and indigenous rights. He criticized the militaristic-style police response to the protesters at Standing Rock. Writing in an editorial in The New York Times he said:

"Perhaps only in North Dakota, where oil tycoons wine and dine elected officials, and where the governor, Jack Dalrymple, serves as an adviser to the Trump campaign, would state and county governments act as the armed enforcement for corporate interests. In recent weeks, the state has militarized my reservation, with road blocks and license-plate checks, low-flying aircraft and racial profiling of Indians. The local sheriff and the pipeline company have both called our protest "unlawful," and Gov. Dalrymple has declared a state of emergency."

The protesters achieved their goal of blocking the pipeline. After months of protest, in December 2016 the United States Army Corps of Engineers under the Obama administration announced that it would not grant an easement for the pipeline and was undertaking an environmental impact statement to look at possible alternative routes. In February 2017, newly-elected President Donald Trump ended the environmental impact assessment and ordered construction to continue. The pipeline was completed in April. Saying, "Our fight isn’t over until there is permanent protection of our people and resources from the pipeline," Archambault said that he and the tribe will continue to protest and work for Native American rights issues. He disputes the claim that they are promoting "energy independence" and argues that true energy independence can only come through non-fossil fuel energy sources. Archambault believes that the pipeline protests have helped to awaken and empower young people, both locally and internationally.

== Native American rights and economic development ==
Archambault testified before the United Nations Human Rights Council in Geneva, led the Washington, D.C., “Native Nations Rise” march and published editorials in The New York Times. Among many awards and honors Chairman Archambault was named a “Leading Global Thinker of 2016” by Foreign Policy Magazine, was given the "Native American Leadership Award" by the National Congress of American Indians, was honored as the "Global Green Champion" at the 14th Annual Global Green Pre-Oscar Party and received a "Doctorate of Law Honoris Causa" from the Vermont Law School. In 2017, Archambault joined the Native American Venture Fund to promote the expansion of Native American Economic development, while maintaining the tribes culture, sovereignty and values.

== Family ==
Archambault has seven siblings: Billi Hornbeck, Jodi Archambault, Sunshine Carlow, Amber Powless, Rick Red Blanket, Charles Archambault, and Jim Archambault. He is married to Nicole Thunder Hawk and they have two children, Jaimie and Jayce. He writes that family is very important to him:

"Along with my in-laws we still grow fresh vegetables, hunt, fish, and raise horses. As a young father, I want my children to experience reservation life. It’s hard because more and more we are losing our identity. If we don’t pass on some of the good ways that were shared with us, our children’s children will not know who or what they are. Through my eyes – I see the youth as the most important. I want to create an environment for them so they can experience the most meaningful life lessons. Or at least try!

Many members of Archambault's family have worked to support Native American causes. In 2009, President Obama appointed his sister Jodi Archambault to be Deputy Associate Director of Intergovernmental Affairs. She was the first Native American to hold that position, which acts as the "front door" to the White House for tribal nations. During her time in office she worked on the 2013 Violence Against Women Act, which recognized the inherent right of tribal nations to prosecute non-Indians who commit violence against women. His sister Sunshine Carlow is active in promoting Native American culture. She facilitates the Standing Rock Education Consortium and the Lakota/Dakota Language Revitalization Program in Fort Yates, North Dakota. Sister Billie Hornbeck works as financial aid director at Oglala Lakota College.
