= LaDonna Brave Bull Allard =

Lakota historian and activist (1956–2021)

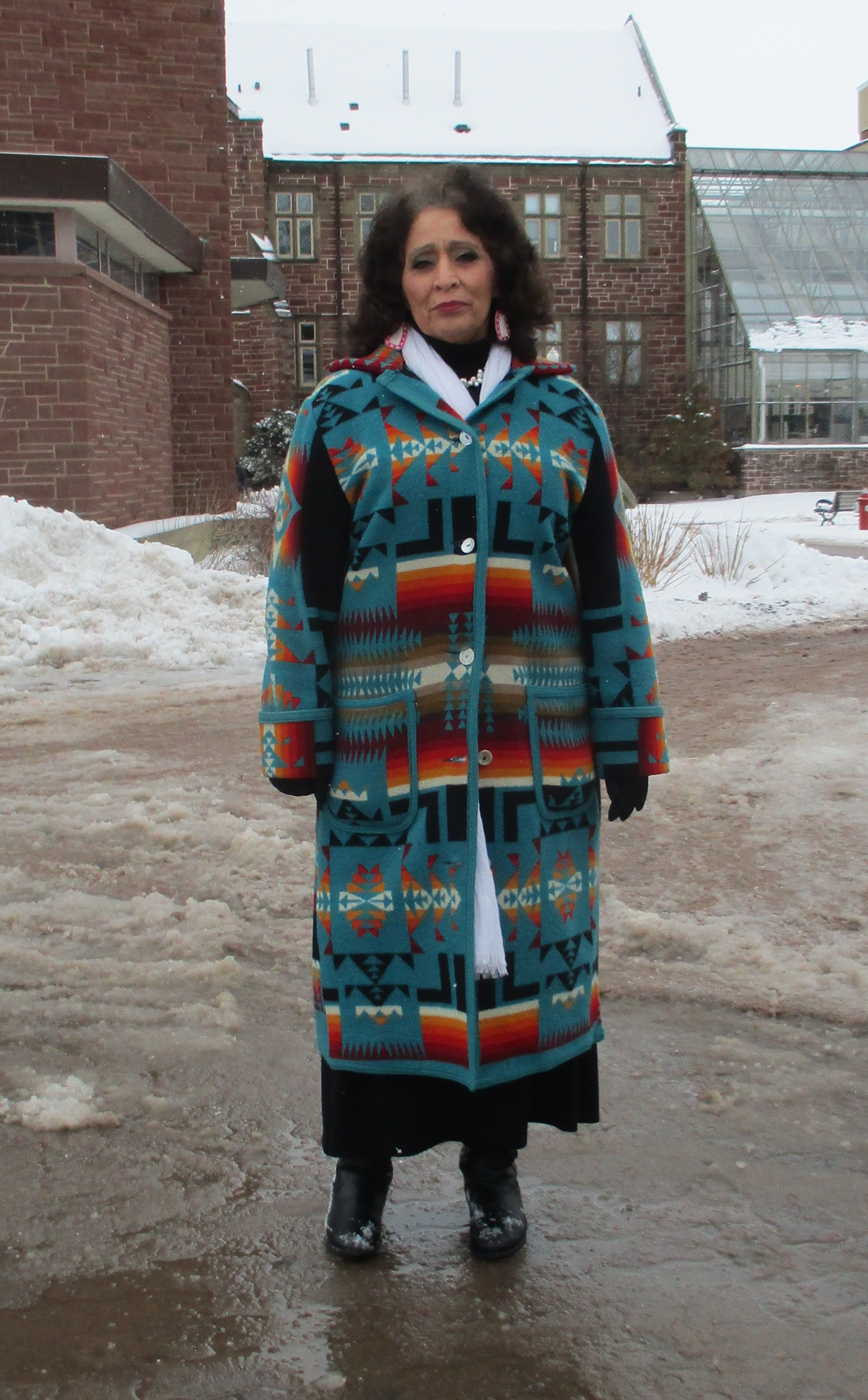
- Born: LaDonna Brave Bull; June 8, 1956; Fort Yates, North Dakota, United States
- Died: April 10, 2021 (aged 64); Fort Yates, North Dakota, United States
- Other name: Tamakawastewin
- Occupations: Historian, activist
- Known for: Dakota Access Pipeline protests
- Spouse: Miles Dennis Allard (died 2018)
- Children: 1, Philip Levon Hurkes (died 2009)

LaDonna Brave Bull Allard (June 8, 1956 – April 10, 2021), known as Tamakawastewin ("Good Earth Woman"), was a Native American Dakota and Lakota historian, genealogist, and a matriarch of the water protector movement.

In April 2016, she became one of the founders of the resistance camps of the Dakota Access Pipeline protests, aimed at halting the Dakota Access Pipeline near the Standing Rock Indian Reservation in North Dakota.

== Early life ==
LaDonna Brave Bull Allard was born in Fort Yates, North Dakota, on June 8, 1956, to Valerie Lovejoy and Frank Brave Bull. Her people are Iháŋkthuŋwaŋ, Pabaska (Cuthead) and Sisseton Dakota on her father's side and Hunkpapa, Lakota Blackfoot and Oglala Lakota on her mother's side.

She was a descendant of Chief Rain-in-the-face who fought Custer at the Battle of Greasy Grass.

She was also a descendant of Oyate Tawa, one of the 38 Dakota people hung in the largest mass execution in US history in Mankato, Minnesota, and of Nape Hote Win (Mary Big Moccasin), a survivor of the Whitestone Massacre. She was an enrolled member of the Standing Rock Sioux Tribe.

Brave Bull Allard spent much of her younger years with her grandmothers Alice West and Eva Kuntz.

As a child, she hauled her family's drinking water by horseback from the Inyan Wakangapi Wakpa (River that Makes the Sacred Stones), the Cannonball River. At its confluence with the Missouri River, a whirlpool created large, spherical sandstone formations, known as Sacred Stones. In the 1950s, this sacred site was destroyed when the U.S. Army Corps of Engineers dredged the mouth of the Cannonball River as they finished the Oahe Dam.

The dam flooded Brave Bull Allard's land along with 160,000 acres of the Standing Rock Sioux Reservation and 300,000 acres of the Cheyenne River Reservation. Her family was among numerous Tribal communities along the Missouri River that were forced to relocate to new sites on the plains above the river valley.

Brave Bull Allard attended the Standing Rock Community College and Black Hills State College, and later graduated from the University of North Dakota with a degree in History.

== Career ==
After college, Brave Bull Allard worked for the Standing Rock Sioux Tribe as the cultural resource planner. Later, she helped create the Standing Rock Tribal Historic Preservation Office and Tourism Office, where she was instrumental in establishing the Standing Rock Scenic Byway, which passes many historic sites, including where Sitting Bull was killed. She also helped oversee improvements to Sitting Bull's Fort Yates grave site after the land was repatriated to the Standing Rock Sioux Tribe in 2007.

As a historian, she worked with many institutions to document Indigenous genealogy, narratives and culture. In 2009, she helped coordinate Wiyohpiyata: Lakota Images of the Contested West, an exhibition at the Peabody Museum of Archeology and Ethnology at Harvard University.

In 2019, she became an official representative for Indigenous Peoples at the United Nations Economic and Social Council. In 2020, she was featured in the PBS documentary Zitkála-Šá: Trailblazing American Indian Composer and Writer. Some of her extensive tribal genealogy work can be seen at a history website called American Tribes.

== Movement work ==
The first resistance camp of the Dakota Access Pipeline protests, Sacred Stone Camp, was established on Brave Bull Allard's family's land at the confluence of the Cannon Ball River and the Missouri River. The resistance camps were initially quite small, but grew exponentially in size after she posted an emotional plea for help on social media.

These protests sought to halt the construction of the Dakota Access Pipeline because it crossed lands protected by the Treaty of Fort Laramie (1851), threatened historic sacred sites, and ran beneath the Lake Oahe reservoir, the drinking water source for the Standing Rock Sioux Tribe. During the construction of the pipeline, workers bulldozed burial grounds and other archeological sites identified by Brave Bull Allard and others working with the Standing Rock Tribal Historic Preservation Office. The movement at Standing Rock brought thousands of people together to form the largest intertribal alliance on the American continent in centuries, with more than 200 tribal nations represented.

After years of resistance and protest, the Standing Rock Sioux Tribe and Indigenous organizers scored a legal victory on June 6, 2020, when a federal judge ordered pipeline owner consortium Dakota Access LLC, controlled by Energy Transfer Partners (founder and CEO Kelcy Warren), to stop operations and empty its pipelines of all oil pending an environmental review that could take a year. The court said the U.S. Army Corps of Engineers violated national environment law when it granted an easement to Energy Transfer to build and operate beneath Lake Oahe because it failed to produce an adequate Environmental Impact Statement.

== Recognition ==
Brave Bull Allard received many accolades for her movement work. In 2017, she was featured Sierra Club's People Power List, represented the water protector movement to receive the DePaul University Humanities Laureate Award and appear as finalists for the MIT Disobedience Award, and she received the Rebel of the Year Award from Conservation Colorado.

In 2019, she received the Pax Natura Award and the William Sloane Coffin Jr. Peacemaker Award.

== Death ==
In 2020, Brave Bull Allard was diagnosed with glioblastoma, an aggressive brain cancer, and underwent brain surgery. On April 10, 2021, her family announced her death in Fort Yates, North Dakota. She was preceded in death by her son Philip Levon Hurkes in 2009 and her husband, Miles Dennis Allard, in 2018.

Upon her death, North Dakota State Representative Ruth Buffalo said, "Her courage was contagious and inspiring. She was very knowledgeable of the extensive history of the land and worked to preserve our history and sacred sites." South Dakota state Senator Red Dawn Foster said, "She inspired the world with her love for the water, the land, the people, and the love she shared with her husband Miles."
