= Timeline of government attacks on journalists in the United States =

U.S. attacks against journalists within the country

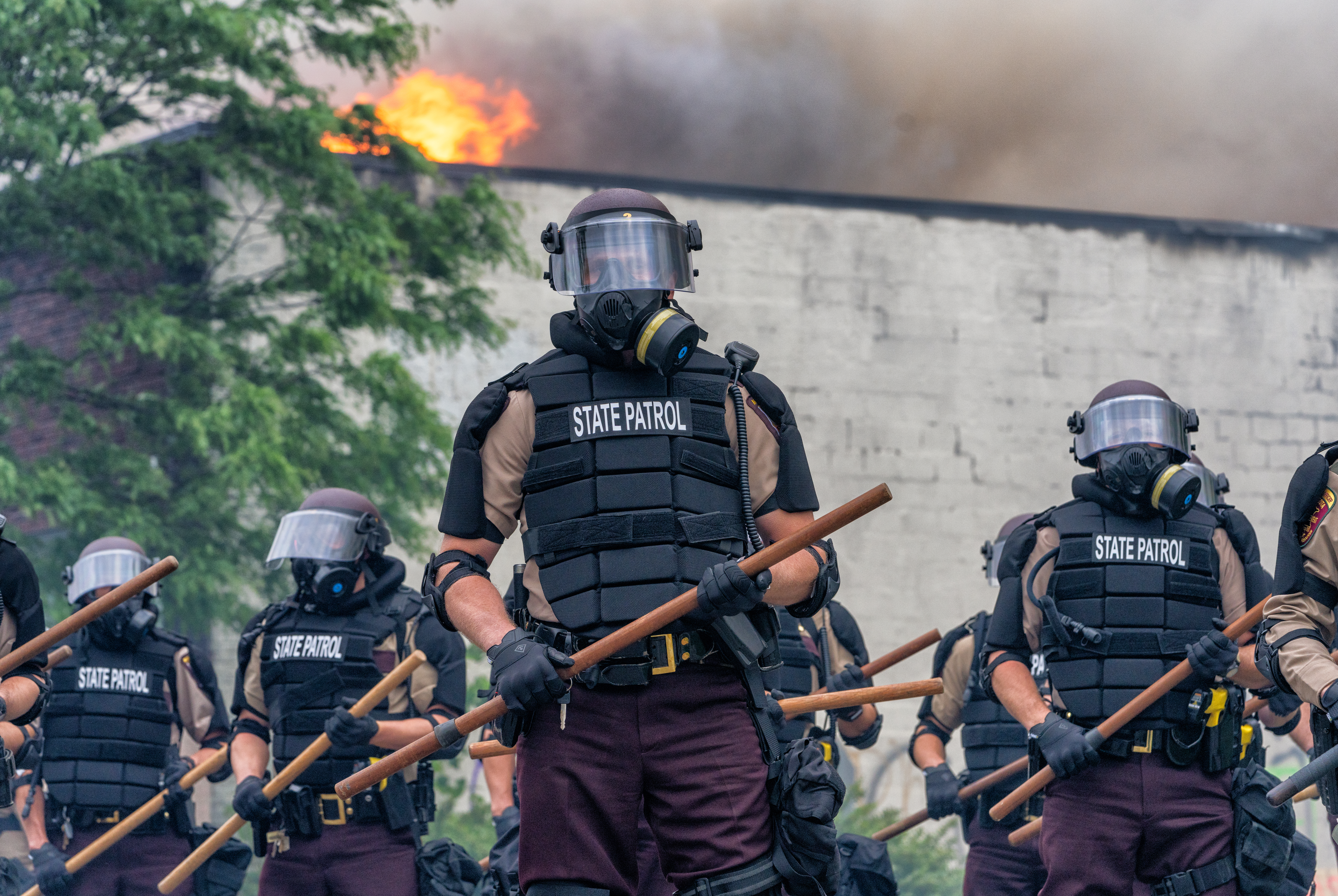
Minnesota State Patrol troopers in formation at a George Floyd protest in Minneapolis, Minnesota, where troopers arrested journalists

Government attacks on journalists have occurred in the United States throughout its history. Although freedom of speech is protected by the First Amendment, federal, state, and municipal actors have in many cases led, participated in, and encouraged attacks against journalists.

Some forms of attacks on journalists have included police assault leading to injury or death using weapons such as batons, pepper spray, rubber bullets, or tear gas; police kettling and mass arrests of journalists; the prosecution of journalists for sedition or treason after reporting (especially anti-war reporting) that construes the U.S. federal government in a negative way; the seizing or destruction of media property and resources using state militias and government-led paramilitaries and mobs; the arrest of student journalists due to on-the-ground reporting at contentious scenes; and Federal Bureau of Investigation (FBI) raids of journalist homes to seize information leaked by whistleblowers.

According to many journalist advocacy groups and academics, Donald Trump's actions have contributed to a significant decline in freedom of the press. During his second presidency, Immigration and Customs Enforcement (ICE) agents repeatedly assaulted and arrested journalists. Reporters Without Borders claimed "after a century of gradual expansion of press rights in the United States, the country is experiencing its first significant and prolonged decline in press freedom in modern history, and Donald Trump's return to the presidency is greatly exacerbating the situation."

== 1789–1865: Early republic and Civil War ==
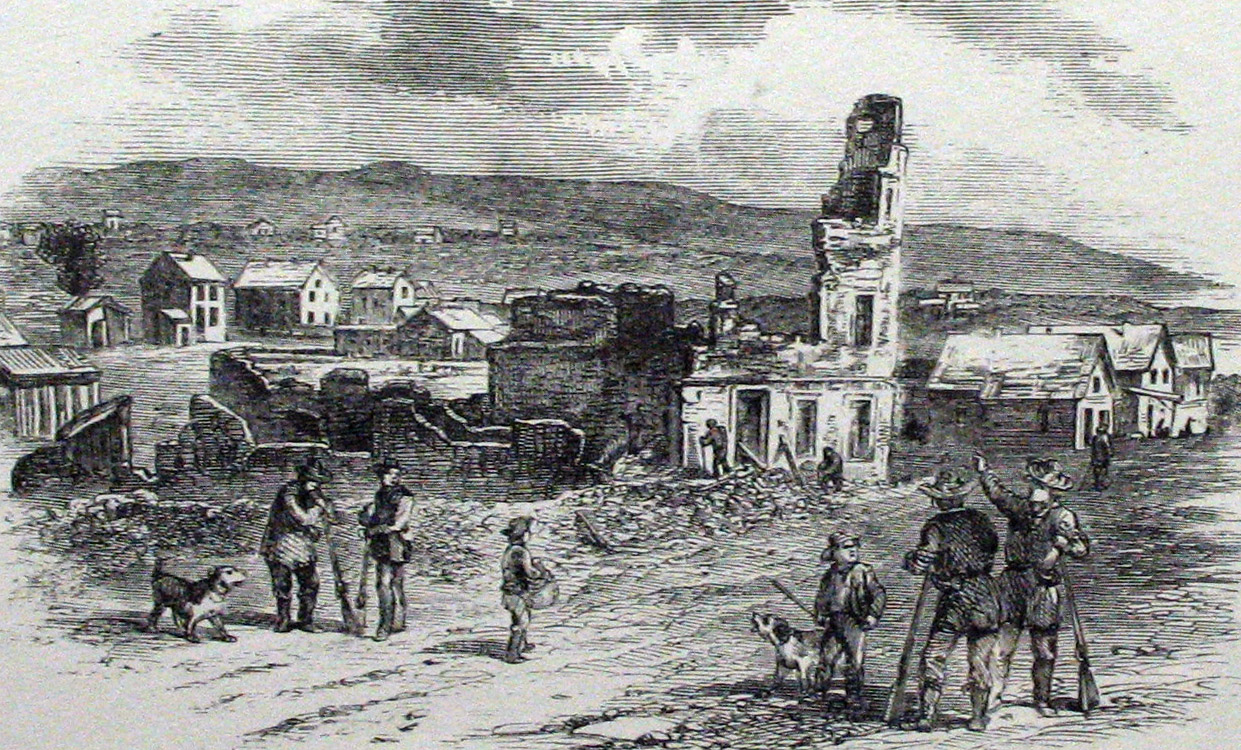
Ruins of Lawrence, Kansas after sheriff-led mob seized and destroyed the Kansas Free State and the Herald of Freedom newspapers

=== 1797–1801: John Adams' presidency ===
==== 1798: Sedition Act prosecutions against anti-Federalist press ====
The Alien and Sedition Acts of 1798 were four U.S. statutes that restricted naturalization, empowered the president of the United States to detain and deport foreigners, and criminalized false or malicious statements against the federal government. The laws were endorsed by the Federalist Party, led by President John Adams, on national security grounds in response to the later stages of the French Revolution and ongoing disputes with the French revolutionary government which had culminated in naval skirmishes. The prosecution of American journalists under the Sedition Act rallied public support for the opposition, led by Thomas Jefferson, who defeated Adams in the presidential election of 1800.

The Sedition Act was the most controversial of the four laws and passed narrowly by a vote of 44–41 in the House of Representatives after several amendments, including a sunset provision which caused the law to expire in March 1801, which was the start of the next presidential term.

The Sedition Act was enforced primarily against editors and publishers aligned with the Democratic-Republicans who criticized the Federalist administration of President John Adams. Notable cases included Representative Matthew Lyon (convicted and re-elected while jailed), pamphleteer James Thomson Callender of the Richmond Examiner (fined and imprisoned), and Benjamin Franklin Bache, editor of the Philadelphia Aurora (arrested; died of yellow fever before trial). Federalist judges such as Samuel Chase enforced the law vigorously; contemporaries and many historians have viewed the prosecutions as a partisan effort to suppress opposition newspapers and chill political speech.

Scholars identify roughly 17 indictments and 10 convictions under the Act, almost all involving Democratic-Republican printers or speakers. The statute was drafted to sunset on March 3, 1801; after taking office, President Thomas Jefferson issued pardons and remitted fines. The episode is widely remembered as an early and significant violation of freedom of the press.

=== 1829–1836: Andrew Jackson's presidency ===
==== 1835: Georgia Guard seizes the Cherokee Phoenix press ====
In 1835, during the period leading up to the Trail of Tears, the Georgia Guard — a state militia unit organized to police Cherokee territory claimed by Georgia – seized the printing press of the Cherokee Phoenix, the first newspaper published by Native Americans in the United States. The newspaper had been established in 1828 at New Echota, the capital of the Cherokee Nation, and was published in both English and the Cherokee syllabary.

The seizure occurred amid escalating tensions between Georgia and the Cherokee Nation over sovereignty and removal in the wake of the Indian Removal Act. Contemporary and scholarly accounts note that the Guard confiscated the press to prevent anti-removal views from being published, effectively halting the paper's revival efforts in 1835; the paper had already ceased in May 1834 when a federal annuity payment failed. The controversy over removal culminated the same year in the signing of the Treaty of New Echota (December 29, 1835), which became the federal basis for removal despite broad Cherokee opposition.

Exhibitions and scholarship have characterized the 1835 confiscation as an instance of state-sponsored censorship of an Indigenous-run press. The Cherokee Phoenix would not resume as a Cherokee Nation publication until its 20th-century revival; the separate Cherokee Advocate began publication in 1844 in Tahlequah.

=== 1853–1856: Franklin Pierce's presidency ===
==== 1856: Sacking of Lawrence sheriff seizes the press ====
The sacking of Lawrence occurred on May 21, 1856, when pro-slavery settlers, led by Douglas County Sheriff Samuel J. Jones, attacked and ransacked Lawrence, Kansas, a town that had been founded by anti-slavery settlers from Massachusetts who were hoping to make Kansas a free state. The incident fueled the irregular conflict in Kansas Territory that later became known as Bleeding Kansas.

The human cost of the attack was low: only one person—a member of the pro-slavery gang—was killed, and his death was accidental. However, Jones and his men halted production of the Free-State newspapers the Kansas Free State and the Herald of Freedom, destroying the presses and offices (with the former ceasing publication altogether and the latter taking months to once again start up). The pro-slavery gunmen also destroyed the Free State Hotel and Charles L. Robinson's house.

=== 1861–1865: Abraham Lincoln's presidency ===
==== 1861: Union military arrests press ====
In the early months of the American Civil War, Union military authorities arrested a number of newspaper editors and publishers for perceived disloyalty or interference with the war effort, and in many cases shut down their presses.

One widely noted case occurred in September 1861, when Frank Key Howard, editor of Baltimore's Daily Exchange, was arrested by Union authorities and confined as a political prisoner. Howard's paper had published strongly anti-administration editorials and was implicated by federal officials in efforts to stir secessionist sentiment in Maryland; he was first imprisoned at Fort McHenry and later transferred to other military prisons.

Federal forces likewise acted against newspapers in several border states. In St. Louis, on July 12, 1861, Colonel Chester Harding – acting under orders from Brigadier General Nathaniel Lyon — suppressed the Daily Missouri State Journal and arrested its editor, Joseph W. Tucker, on a treason charge. In Baltimore, multiple papers—including the South and the Daily Exchange—were suspended or forced to cease publication following the arrest of their editors.

Contemporary observers and later scholars have described these actions as wartime press suppressions justified by Union officials on grounds of military necessity and national security.

==== 1864: Federal seizure of the New York World and Journal of Commerce ====
On May 18, 1864, after the New York World and Journal of Commerce printed a forged presidential proclamation, President Abraham Lincoln ordered Major General John Adams Dix to arrest the editors, proprietors, and publishers of the two papers and "take possession by military force" of their printing establishments in New York City, halting further publication until further orders. The spurious proclamation—circulated in the guise of an Associated Press dispatch—named a national day of fasting and prayer and called for an additional draft of 400,000 men.

Dix promptly executed the order: troops occupied the newspaper offices and suspended publication. Within two days, after authorities determined the document was a hoax, the administration rescinded the arrests and allowed the papers to resume; publication restarted by May 23, 1864. Investigators soon arrested the forgers—journalists Joe Howard Jr. and Francis A. Mallison; Howard was imprisoned at Fort Lafayette until August 23, 1864.

The episode provoked sharp debate over wartime press powers. Critics – including Democratic editors and some Republicans – condemned the seizures and arrests as censorship and an overreach beyond civil authority, while administration officials defended them as a temporary military necessity to counter a destabilizing fraud.

== 1866–1945: Reconstruction and world wars ==
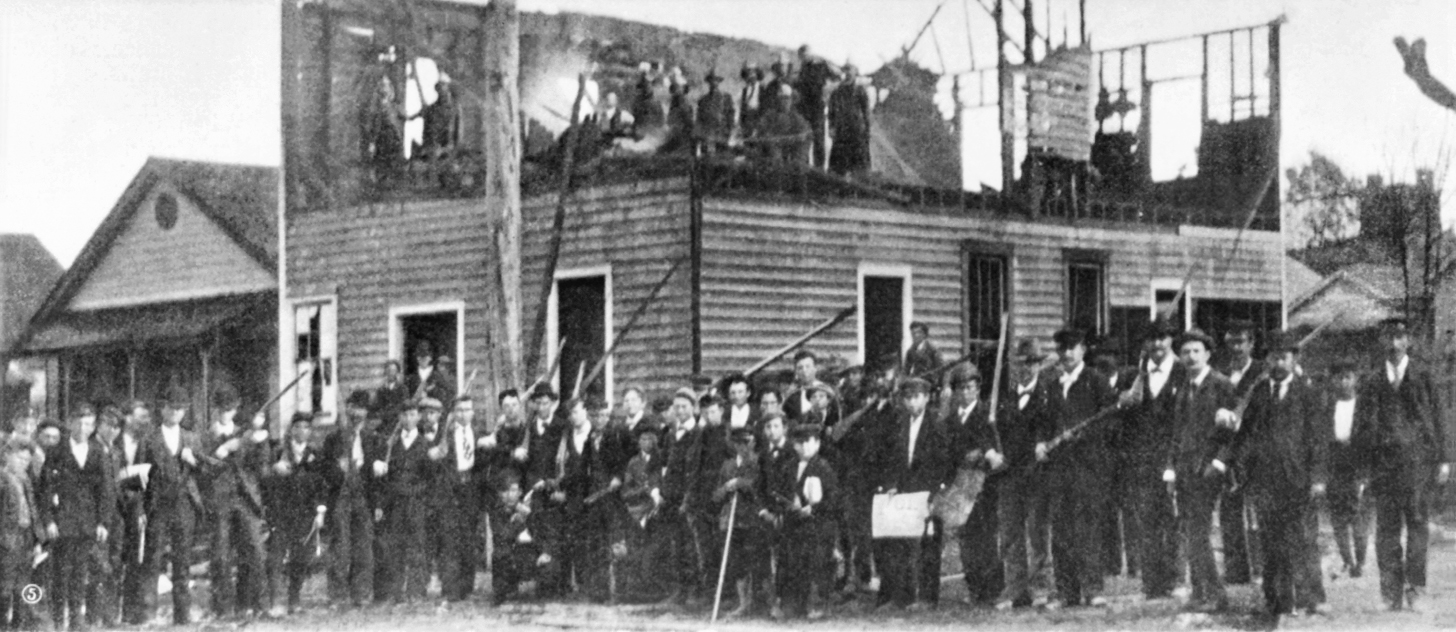
Government-backed mob posing by the ruins of the Wilmington Daily Record African American newspaper

=== 1897–1901: William McKinley's presidency ===
==== 1898: Wilmington massacre and burning of The Daily Record ====
The Wilmington massacre, also known as the Wilmington insurrection or the Wilmington coup, was a municipal-level coup d'état and a massacre that was carried out by white supremacists in Wilmington, North Carolina, United States, on Thursday, November 10, 1898. The white press in Wilmington originally described the event as a race riot perpetrated by a mob of black people. In studies beginning in 2016, the event has been characterized as terrorism and a violent overthrow of a duly elected government by white supremacists.

On November 10, 1898, white supremacists in Wilmington, North Carolina, set fire to the offices of the African American–owned Wilmington Daily Record, destroying its press in the opening act of the city's coup d'état. State authorities under Gov. Daniel Lindsay Russell then activated the local militia: the Wilmington Light Infantry and a naval militia detachment patrolled the streets with a rapid-fire gun as the violence unfolded, providing cover to the mob during the violence.

Under this show of state power, the Daily Record remained suppressed; editor Alexander Manly fled, and armed forces helped "restore order" on terms set by the coup leaders—actions described then and since as the use of public force to silence an oppositional Black press. Later public-history accounts characterize the paper's destruction as a turning point that enabled the overthrow of the elected, biracial city government.

=== 1901–1908: Theodore Roosevelt's presidency ===
==== 1903–1904: Colorado Labor Wars arrests over journalist coverage ====
The Colorado Labor Wars were a series of labor strikes in 1903 and 1904 in the U.S. state of Colorado, by gold and silver miners and mill workers represented by the Western Federation of Miners (WFM). Opposing the WFM were associations of mine owners and businessmen at each location, supported by the Colorado state government. The strikes were notable and controversial for the accompanying violence, and the imposition of martial law by the Colorado National Guard in order to put down the strikes.

Under Governor Peabody's martial law regime, state forces targeted pro-union newspapers in the strike zone. After the Victor Daily Record erroneously reported that a Guardsman was an ex-convict, Guard officers jailed the editor and printers before a retraction could run; with the staff held in the military "bullpen", linotype operator Emma F. Langdon barricaded herself in the office and printed the next day's edition on a Linotype. Guard commanders subsequently imposed prior restraint on the paper, prohibiting coverage favorable to the WFM; amid near-daily arrests, even the Cripple Creek Times cautioned readers not to comment on the strike.

Following the June 1904 Independence depot explosion and a purge of local officials, mixed posses of Guardsmen, deputies, and Citizens' Alliance members shut union presses outright: the Record office and machinery were wrecked, staff were repeatedly arrested, and the governor publicly offered state funds to cover the damage—after which the paper reappeared with an anti-union line. These actions formed part of a broader suspension of civil liberties—including freedom of the press—under state military rule.

=== 1913–1920: Woodrow Wilson's presidency ===
==== 1917–1918: Espionage Act journalist prosecutions ====
The Espionage Act of 1917 is a United States federal law enacted on June 15, 1917, shortly after the United States entered World War I. It has been amended numerous times over the years. It was originally found in Title 50 of the U.S. Code (War & National Defense), but is now found under Title 18 (Crime & Criminal Procedure): 18 U.S.C. ch. 37 (18 U.S.C. § 792 et seq.).

It was intended to prohibit interference with military operations or recruitment, to prevent insubordination in the military, and to prevent the support of enemies of the United States during wartime. In 1919, the Supreme Court of the United States unanimously ruled through Schenck v. United States that the act did not violate the freedom of speech of those convicted under its provisions. The constitutionality of the law, its relationship to free speech and the meaning of its language have been contested in court ever since.

During World War I, federal officials used the Espionage Act of 1917 and postal laws to curb antiwar and radical newspapers. The Post Office Department, led by Postmaster General Albert S. Burleson, denied or revoked mailing privileges for periodicals deemed seditious, a tactic that functioned as prior restraint by cutting off distribution. In litigation over the socialist daily Milwaukee Leader, the Supreme Court upheld the government's power to revoke second-class mailing privileges, sustaining Burleson's order against the paper. Earlier, the government had barred issues of The Masses from the mails; although a federal district judge briefly enjoined the ban, the Second Circuit dissolved the injunction, allowing postal censorship to continue during the war.

Prosecutors also pursued criminal cases against editors and publishers under the Act for articles and editorials that criticized the war or conscription. In Frohwerk v. United States, the Supreme Court affirmed the conviction of a newspaper writer whose series of articles was found to interfere with military recruitment. In Schaefer v. United States, the Court sustained, in significant part, convictions of German-language newspaper editors based on wartime coverage and commentary.

These measures – postal bans, loss of mailing status, and Espionage Act prosecutions – disrupted newsroom operations, suppressed circulation, and chilled coverage at socialist, labor, and foreign-language outlets. Contemporary civil-liberties commentators and later scholars have characterized the campaign as a major incursion on freedom of the press during wartime, achieved through a combination of criminal charges and administrative censorship rather than overt press licensing.

==== 1918–1920: Sedition Act prosecutions of journalists ====
The Sedition Act of 1918 (Pub. L. 65–150, 40 Stat. 553, enacted May 16, 1918) was an Act of the United States Congress that extended the Espionage Act of 1917 to cover a broader range of offenses, notably speech and the expression of opinion that cast the government or the war effort in a negative light or interfered with the sale of government bonds.

It forbade the use of "disloyal, profane, scurrilous, or abusive language" about the United States government, its flag, or its armed forces or that caused others to view the American government or its institutions with contempt. Those convicted under the act generally received sentences of imprisonment for five to 20 years. The act also allowed the Postmaster General to refuse to deliver mail that met those same standards for punishable speech or opinion. It applied only to times "when the United States is in war". The U.S. was in a declared state of war at the time of passage, the First World War. The law was repealed on December 13, 1920.

Enforcement of the Sedition Act of 1918 — which expanded the Espionage Act of 1917 — fell heavily on editors and reporters at antiwar and socialist outlets, using criminal prosecutions carrying five- to twenty-year penalties and postal bans to curtail coverage deemed disloyal.

Courts sustained several prosecutions of working press. In Frohwerk v. United States (1919), the Supreme Court upheld the conviction of Jacob Frohwerk, editor of the German-language Missouri Staats-Zeitung, for antiwar editorials. Victor L. Berger – editor of the Milwaukee Leader and a Socialist member-elect of Congress – was convicted in 1919 alongside journalist codefendants; the Court later reversed due to judicial bias in Berger v. United States (1921). Separately, postal sanctions crippled Berger's paper: the Post Office's revocation of the Leader's second-class mailing privileges was upheld in United States ex rel. Milwaukee Social Democratic Publishing Co. v. Burleson (1921).

Other newsroom cases showed both the reach and limits of wartime repression. Editors and contributors to The Masses — including Max Eastman, Floyd Dell, Art Young, and John Reed – were twice tried in 1918 on charges that their writings obstructed the draft; both trials ended in hung juries and the government dropped the cases. Journalist Rose Pastor Stokes — formerly of the Jewish Daily News — was convicted in 1918 and sentenced to ten years for antiwar remarks, but her conviction was later reversed on appeal and the case ultimately dismissed.

==== 1919: Palmer Raids on radical press ====
The Palmer raids were a series of raids conducted in November 1919 and January 1920 by the United States Department of Justice under the administration of President Woodrow Wilson to capture and arrest suspected socialists, especially anarchists and communists, and deport them from the United States. The raids particularly targeted Italian immigrants and Eastern European Jewish immigrants with alleged leftist ties, with particular focus on Italian anarchists and immigrant leftist labor activists. The raids and arrests occurred under the leadership of United States Attorney General A. Mitchell Palmer, with 6,000 people arrested across 36 cities. Though 556 foreign citizens were deported, including a number of prominent leftist leaders, Palmer's efforts were largely frustrated by officials at the U.S. Department of Labor, which had authority for deportations and objected to Palmer's methods.

The Palmer raids occurred in the larger context of the first Red Scare, a period of anti-communism in the U.S. in the years immediately following World War I and the successful Russian Revolution. There were strikes that garnered national attention, and prompted race riots in more than 30 cities, as well as two sets of bombings in April and June 1919, including one bomb mailed to Palmer's home in response to his policy of politically motivated mass arrests and deportations.

During the Palmer Raids, federal agents repeatedly swept through radical newspapers' editorial rooms and affiliated cultural centers, seizing presses, type, and large quantities of printed matter. Affidavits compiled by the nascent American Civil Liberties Union (ACLU) described raids in New York in which Bureau of Investigation officers smashed furniture and typewriters, tore manuscripts, and carted away "boxes of books and papers," including membership lists and editorial files from the Russian-language daily Novy Mir and the Russian People's House where writers and printers worked.

Editors, writers, and printers were arrested under sweeping immigration warrants; some were deported. Among the most prominent were anarchist editors Emma Goldman and Alexander Berkman, who were removed to Russia in December 1919 during Attorney General A. Mitchell Palmer's crackdown. The ACLU's dossier also documented the secret confinement of Italian anarchist printers Andrea Salsedo and Roberto Elia in BOI custody in New York; Salsedo died after falling from a Bureau window, and the organization catalogued the case as emblematic of unlawful detention and coercion used against the radical press and its workers.

Contemporaries in the legal community argued that the raids amounted to unconstitutional prior restraint and intimidation of the press. The ACLU's 1920 report assembled hundreds of sworn statements on warrantless searches of newsrooms, seizure of printing equipment, and denial of counsel to editors and staff, and Harvard scholar Zechariah Chafee Jr.'s Freedom of Speech criticized the campaign's suppression of radical journalism. Judges later condemned aspects of the Justice Department's methods and ordered releases in deportation cases, underscoring how the anti-radical dragnet chilled radical periodicals and those who produced them.

== 1946–2001: Globalization era ==
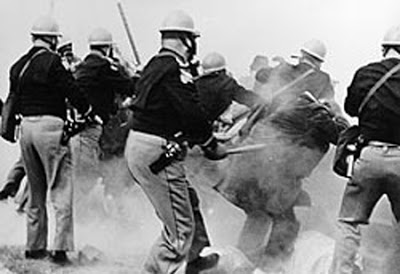
Alabama Highway Patrol troopers attack civil rights demonstrators and reporters outside Selma, Alabama, on Bloody Sunday.

=== 1953–1960: Dwight Eisenhower's presidency ===
==== 1956–1959: Sedition charges against John Powell ====
John William Powell (July 3, 1919 – December 15, 2008) was a journalist and small business proprietor who edited the China Weekly Review, an English-language journal first published by his father, John B. Powell in Shanghai.

John W. Powell was tried for sedition in 1959 after publishing an article that reported on allegations made by Mainland Chinese officials that the United States and Japan were carrying out germ warfare in the Korean War. In 1956, the Eisenhower Administration's Department of Justice pressed sedition charges against Powell, his wife Sylvia, and Julian Schuman, after federal prosecutors secured grand jury indictments against them for publishing allegations of bacteriological warfare. However, the prosecutors failed to get any convictions. The defendants invoked their Constitutional right to refuse to reveal self-incriminating evidence, and U.S. Department of Defense officials also refused to provide any incriminating archives or witnesses. This information was not revealed until decades later as a result of Freedom of Information Act requests.

All three of the defendants were acquitted of all charges over the next six years, after a Federal judge dismissed the core aspects of the case against them in 1959, due to obviously insufficient evidence against them.

=== 1961–1963: John Kennedy's presidency ===
==== 1963: Birmingham campaign: violence against reporters ====
The Birmingham campaign, also known as the Birmingham movement or Birmingham confrontation, was an American movement organized in early 1963 by the Southern Christian Leadership Conference to bring attention to the integration efforts of African Americans in Birmingham, Alabama.

Led by Martin Luther King Jr., James Bevel, Fred Shuttlesworth and others, the campaign of nonviolent direct action culminated in the 1963 Children's Crusade, widely publicized confrontations between young black students marching peacefully to City Hall to talk to the Mayor and white civic authorities, who stopped them with force, dogs, and fire hoses. These events led the municipal government to change the city's discrimination laws and the federal government to began the process of drafting the 1964 Civil Rights Act. (Full article...)

In 1963 journalists covering the Birmingham campaign reported widespread physical interference and violence as they documented police deployment of dogs and high-pressure water hoses under Public Safety Commissioner Eugene "Bull" Connor. Reporters and photojournalists described being shoved or struck by officers and segregationist bystanders, obstructed from filming, and subjected to equipment seizures and film confiscation – patterns consistent with broader civil-rights-era suppression of newsgathering and the hostile climate facing the press.

Photojournalists on assignment also reported detentions and arrests while covering confrontations in Birmingham, underscoring the risks to press freedom and source protection. Despite local resistance to publishing images of official violence, national and international circulation of photographs from Birmingham – now held in museum collections – both exposed the brutality and highlighted the hazards faced by the press.

=== 1964–1968: Lyndon B. Johnson's presidency ===
==== 1964: Freedom Summer: assaults and arrests of journalists ====
Freedom Summer, also known as Mississippi Freedom Summer (sometimes referred to as the Freedom Summer Project or the Mississippi Summer Project), was a campaign launched by American civil rights activists in June 1964 to register as many African-American voters as possible in the state of Mississippi.

During Freedom Summer, national and local reporters who documented voter-registration drives and segregationist violence faced beatings, threats, and custodial arrests by local law enforcement – often on pretexts such as minor traffic violations or "interference." Police and deputies in locales including Neshoba County, McComb, and Philadelphia detained news crews, shadowed them on back roads, and used jailings and fines to disrupt coverage.

Journalists also reported seizures and destruction of cameras, exposed or confiscated film, and forced ejections from public spaces, courthouses, and crime scenes – tactics that curtailed documentation of attacks on civil-rights workers and voters. Editors and stringers for Northern outlets and foreign-language papers were singled out as "outside agitators," and some reporters were roughed up by mobs while officers looked on or arrived only after assaults had ended.

==== 1965: Bloody Sunday beatings of reporters ====
On March 7, 1965 — Bloody Sunday — Alabama state troopers and possemen charged marchers on the Edmund Pettus Bridge in Selma. Reporters and photographers covering the event described being swept into the melee as troopers swung clubs and deployed gas; news crews documented officers striking people and shoving bystanders, and some equipment was damaged amid the charge.

Weeks earlier, during the February 18, 1965, night march in nearby Marion, lawmen and white mobs directly attacked working press: reporters were beaten and "cameras were smashed," leaving "no photographic record of the night." Among those injured was NBC News correspondent Richard Valeriani, who was clubbed in the head with an ax handle and hospitalized while covering the Marion violence.

Journalists who continued reporting in Selma and surrounding towns recounted ongoing hostility – rough treatment during dispersals and interference with news-gathering – raising contemporaneous press-freedom concerns about officer tactics toward clearly identified media.

==== 1968: Democratic National Convention assaults on journalists ====
Chicago police drag an anti-Vietnam war protester across Michigan Avenue on August 28, 1968, during the Democratic National Convention as the crowd chants "the whole world is watching".

A series of protests against the United States' involvement in the Vietnam War took place prior to and during the 1968 Democratic National Convention in Chicago, Illinois. The protests lasted approximately seven days, from August 23 to August 29, 1968, and drew an estimated 7,000 to 10,000 anti-war protesters in total.

During the week of the 1968 Democratic National Convention in Chicago, a presidentially appointed national commission's Walker Report characterized events as a "police riot", with violence extending to reporters covering both the street clashes and the proceedings inside the hall. Contemporary and retrospective accounts describe journalists being clubbed or shoved, credentials torn, and equipment smashed amid indiscriminate use of batons, mace, and tear gas around Grant Park and the Conrad Hilton; news crews and photographers were among those beaten and gassed as police pushed crowds off Michigan Avenue.

Network coverage and later histories noted that violence captured on camera included attacks on reporters and photographers as well as demonstrators, with mace and tear gas drifting into the Hilton under television lights for minutes at a time while police clubbed people in front of the hotel. The episode became emblematic of clashes between officials and media at mass demonstrations and helped shape debates over press treatment and public-order tactics in the decades that followed.

=== 1969–1974: Richard Nixon's presidency ===
==== 1970: Police killing of Rubén Salazar ====
Rubén Salazar — a columnist for the Los Angeles Times and news director of KMEX-TV — was killed on August 29, 1970, when a Los Angeles County sheriff's deputy, Tom Wilson, fired a tear gas projectile into the doorway of the Silver Dollar Café in East Los Angeles during the National Chicano Moratorium March; the round struck Salazar in the head, killing him instantly. A 1971 county coroner's inquest found the death to be a homicide, but the district attorney declined to file charges; later reviews of Sheriff's Department files concluded there was no evidence Wilson intentionally targeted Salazar.

=== 1993–2000: Bill Clinton's presidency ===
==== 1999: Seattle WTO protests violence against journalists ====
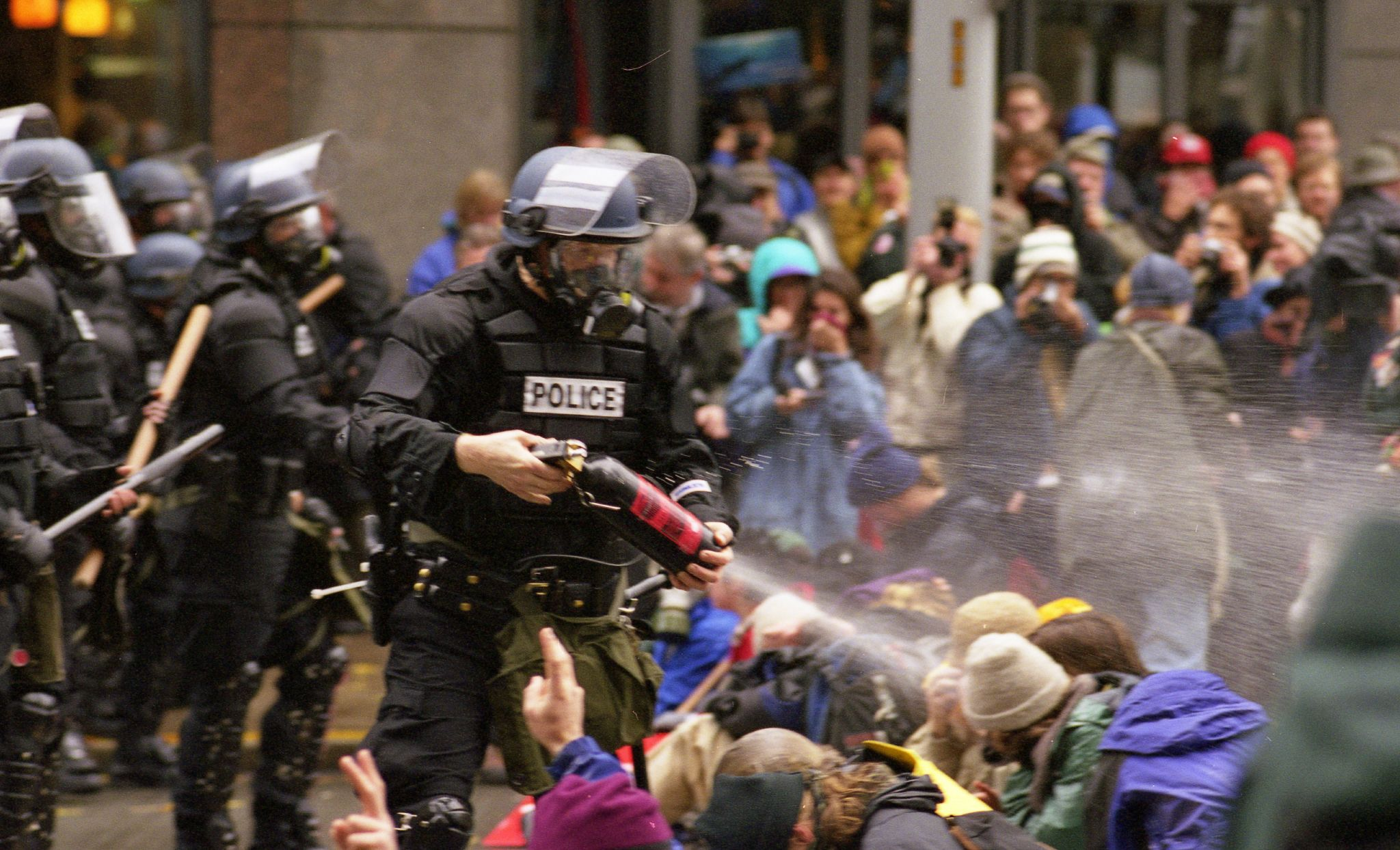
A police officer uses pepper spray on protesters during the 1999 Seattle WTO protests.

The 1999 Seattle WTO protests, sometimes referred to as the Battle of Seattle, were a series of anti-globalization protests surrounding the WTO Ministerial Conference of 1999, where members of the World Trade Organization (WTO) convened at the Washington State Convention and Trade Center in Seattle, Washington on November 30, 1999. The Conference was to be the launch of a new millennial round of trade negotiations.

During the 1999 Seattle WTO protests, police used aggressive public-order tactics – including tear gas, pepper spray, curfews, and an emergency "no-protest zone" — that swept up working reporters alongside demonstrators and hampered news coverage in downtown Seattle. Contemporary accounts describe journalists being driven back by chemical agents, shoved with batons during street clearances, and detained in mass arrest operations even while identifying themselves as press, with several newsrooms later reporting damaged or confiscated equipment amid the chaos.

Subsequent litigation and reviews underscored how those tactics affected newsgathering. A federal jury later found that police lacked probable cause for a major sweep of downtown arrestees – a group that included observers and working media – awarding damages to plaintiffs who were taken into custody during WTO week; other civil cases and settlements followed. At the same time, appellate rulings upholding portions of the downtown security zone highlighted how access restrictions and rolling dispersal orders constrained where reporters could safely stand to observe and document events.

== 2001–2015: Post-9/11 era ==
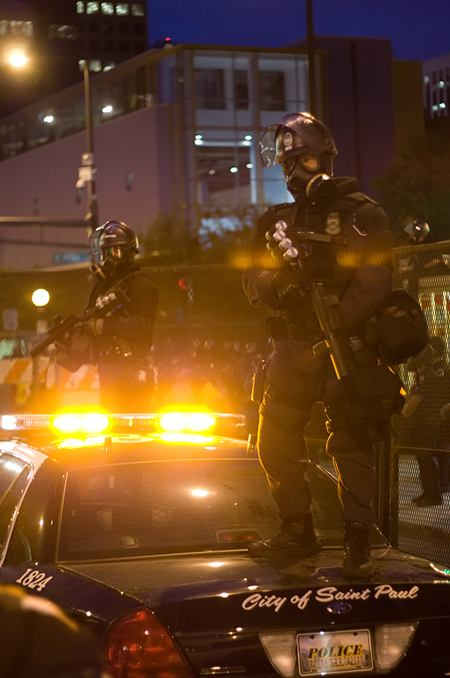
Riot police in downtown Saint Paul during the 2008 RNC protests, where journalists were arrested by police

Following the September 11 attacks, journalists covering protests, national security, and government operations increasingly reported arrests and detentions, equipment seizures, restricted access, and expanded surveillance by law enforcement and security agencies. Press-freedom organizations described a post-9/11 climate in which leak investigations and electronic monitoring deterred sources and chilled reporting, coinciding with a measurable decline in U.S. press-freedom indicators by the mid-2010s.

Analysts attribute these trends to a combination of factors: post-9/11 expansions of secrecy and surveillance under laws and policies related to the USA PATRIOT Act, FISA, and related programs; growth of domestic intelligence sharing and protest monitoring through DHS-funded fusion centers; increasing militarization of policing (e.g., the 1033 program); and the institutionalization of border searches of electronic devices that raised concerns about source confidentiality and unpublished materials.

By 2015, Reporters Without Borders ranked the United States 49th in its World Press Freedom Index, and a joint Human Rights Watch/ACLU study concluded that large-scale U.S. surveillance measurably impeded newsgathering by making sources less willing to communicate with reporters.

=== 2001–2008: George W. Bush's presidency ===
==== Sami al-Hajj ====
Sami Mohy El Din Muhammed Al Hajj (Arabic: سامي محي الدين محمد الحاج), aka Sami Al-Haj (born February 15, 1969) is a Sudanese journalist for the Al Jazeera network. In 2001, while on his way to do camera work for the network in Afghanistan, he was arrested by the Pakistani army and held in the United States Guantanamo Bay detainment camp in Cuba for over six years. After his release, al-Hajj wrote a book titled Prisoner 345. He was released without charge on May 1, 2008. He later attempted to launch legal action against George W. Bush.

Al Hajj's case was portrayed in a documentary titled Prisoner 345 by Al Jazeera producer Ahmad Ibrahim.

==== 2003: FTAA Protests ("Miami Model") violence against journalists ====
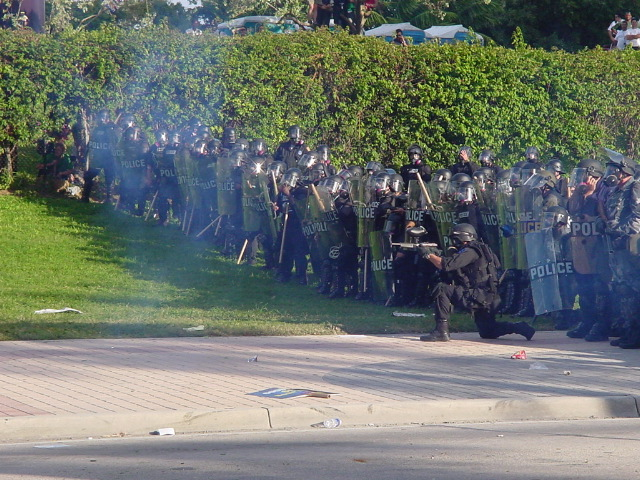
Riot police using less-lethal weapons against FTAA protesters

The Miami model — deployed during the Free Trade Area of the Americas (FTAA) meetings in Miami in November 2003 – featured heavily militarized protest policing, including large interagency deployments, strict perimeters, selective credentialing (with some reporters embedded in police units), and widespread use of less-lethal munitions. Press-freedom groups and observers reported that clearly identified journalists were struck during line pushes and crowd dispersals, hit by rubber bullets and pepper spray, and exposed to concussion/flash-bang devices while covering events near police lines; arrests and detentions also swept in reporters and legal observers, alongside equipment seizures and interference with newsgathering. Subsequent reviews criticized the tactics: a Miami-Dade citizens panel condemned rights violations surrounding the FTAA operation, while civil-liberties groups documented the sidelining of press credentials and the treatment of non-embedded journalists as ordinary demonstrators.

These practices were later cited in litigation and oversight as emblematic of a model that chilled protest coverage and compromised press freedom by normalizing force against working reporters, mass detention near cordons, and post-event legal exposure. Lawsuits and settlements following the FTAA operation documented alleged interference with newsgathering and sought policy reforms, while contemporaneous reporting described photographers and camera crews caught in munitions fire during dispersals.

==== 2004: Republican National Convention detentions of journalists ====
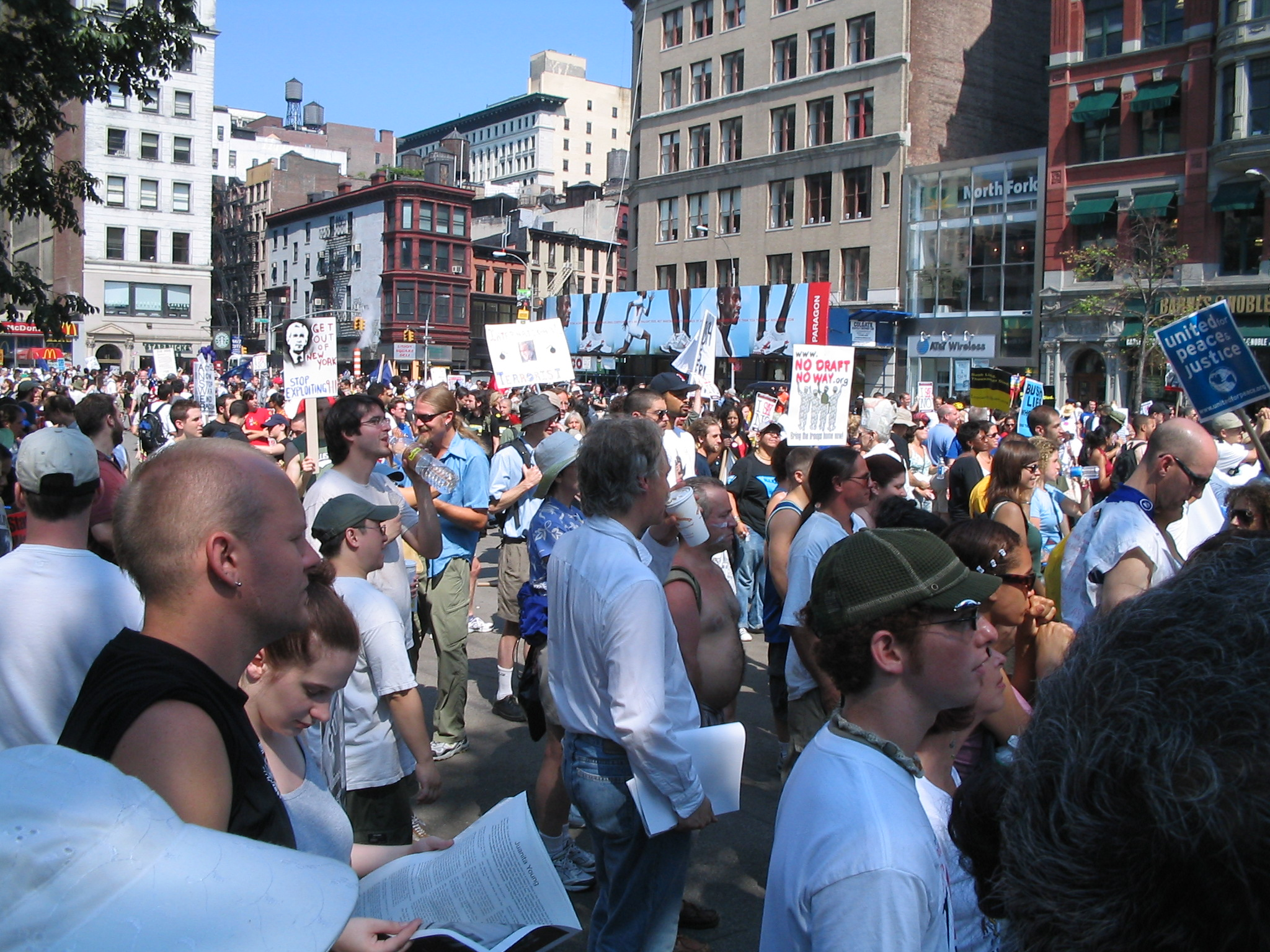
Protesters gather in Union Square before a march.

2004 Republican National Convention protest activity includes the broad range of marches, rallies, performances, demonstrations, exhibits, and acts of civil disobedience in New York City to protest the 2004 Republican National Convention and the nomination of President George W. Bush for the 2004 U.S. presidential election.

During protests around the 2004 RNC in New York City, police detained multiple members of the press, including Newsday photographer Moises Saman, who was grabbed from behind, thrown to the ground, and held for roughly two hours before release. At least six journalists were arrested or detained while covering the convention and related street demonstrations, among them AP photo aides Jeannette Warner and Tim Kulick (Warner was held about 12 hours at Pier 57), Narco News reporter Jennifer Whitney, "Democracy Now!" reporter Daniel Cashin, and a freelance Reuters camerawoman, Eartha Melzer. In a separate incident, WRDR radio journalist Daniel Jones—credentialed by both the convention and the NYPD—was detained more than three hours by police and the Secret Service and had his credentials confiscated.

Beyond the arrests, civil-liberties reviews documented physical handling, mass "sweep" arrests, and harsh detention conditions affecting those documenting police actions. The NYCLU's post-RNC report cited misuse of plastic handcuffs, prolonged detention, and unsafe conditions at Pier 57 (the temporary processing facility), along with "aggressive actions directed at people documenting police actions," which included journalists and legal observers. Contemporary press freedom coverage likewise noted that 1,784 people were arrested overall during the convention week, including an unknown number of journalists, credentialed and noncredentialed.

==== 2008: Republican National Convention mass arrests of journalists ====
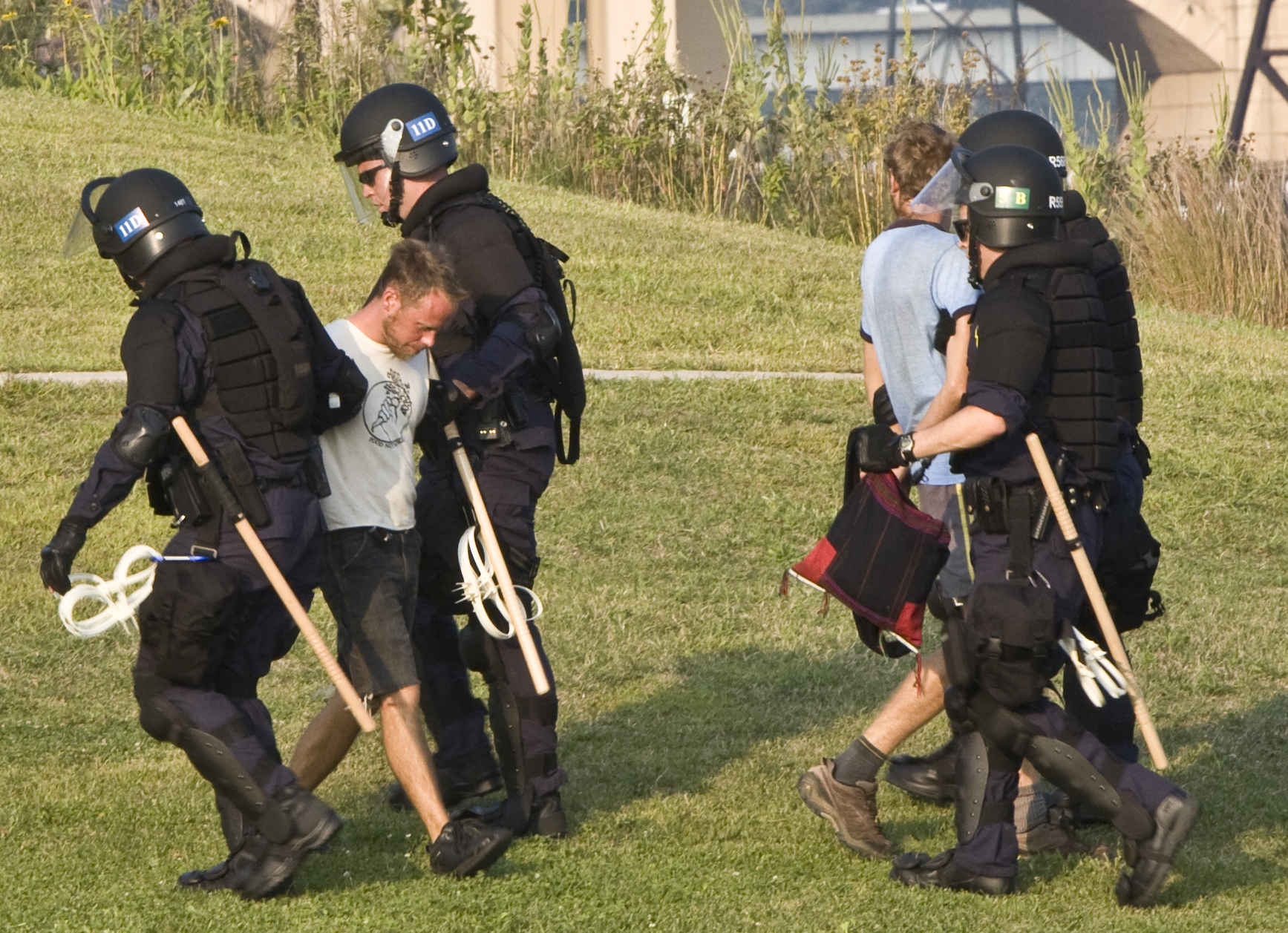
Police arresting protesters during the first day of the convention

Approximately 10,000 largely peaceful protesters marched against the war in Iraq and 2,000 more to end homelessness and poverty. They represented a number of organizations opposed to the Republican Administration including the Poor People's Economic Human Rights Campaign, Veterans for Peace, Iraq Veterans Against the War, Military Families Speak Out, the Teamsters, Code Pink, the American Indian Movement and the RNC Welcoming Committee. About 1,000 people in place for the third major march, and the last to be sanctioned, were stopped on Thursday, September 4, 2008, by police because they attempted to begin their march after the time their march permit expired. The Anti-War Committee, which supports nonviolent action and civil disobedience and had cooperated with anarchist groups, had organized and publicized the march to protest at the time of McCain's acceptance speech, which was in violation of the court-approved protest permit time.

Police in St. Paul, Minnesota arrested or detained dozens of journalists while they were covering protests around the 2008 RNC; those cited included Associated Press reporters Amy Forliti and John Krawczynski, student journalists, local photographers, and independent media crews. In one "kettle" on the Marion Street bridge, reporters were penned in and issued "unlawful assembly" citations alongside demonstrators; authorities later said credentialed press would be cited rather than jailed, and most were released the same day.

Physical force against credentialed reporters was documented. Democracy Now! producer Nicole Salazar was thrown to the ground, pinned with a boot on her back, and arrested while repeatedly shouting "Press!"; video and contemporaneous accounts described cuts and bruising to her face and the seizure of camera equipment. Fellow producer Sharif Abdel Kouddous was kicked in the chest, shoved against a wall, and arrested when he tried to assist, according to sworn allegations later filed in federal court. Amy Goodman was grabbed and arrested after she approached officers to ask about her colleagues' detention; she was charged with obstruction and later released.

Press-freedom groups also recorded searches and seizures of reporters' equipment, prolonged detention, and preemptive raids that swept up media observers. Members of the I Witness Video collective were detained during a house raid days before the convention and later reported further police intimidation while attempting to document misconduct. A subsequent review faulted St. Paul police for their handling of journalists during the RNC, raising concerns about future treatment of alternative and new-media reporters at mass events.

=== 2009–2016: Barack Obama's presidency ===
==== 2011–2012: Occupy Wall Street arrests, detentions, and assaults on journalists ====
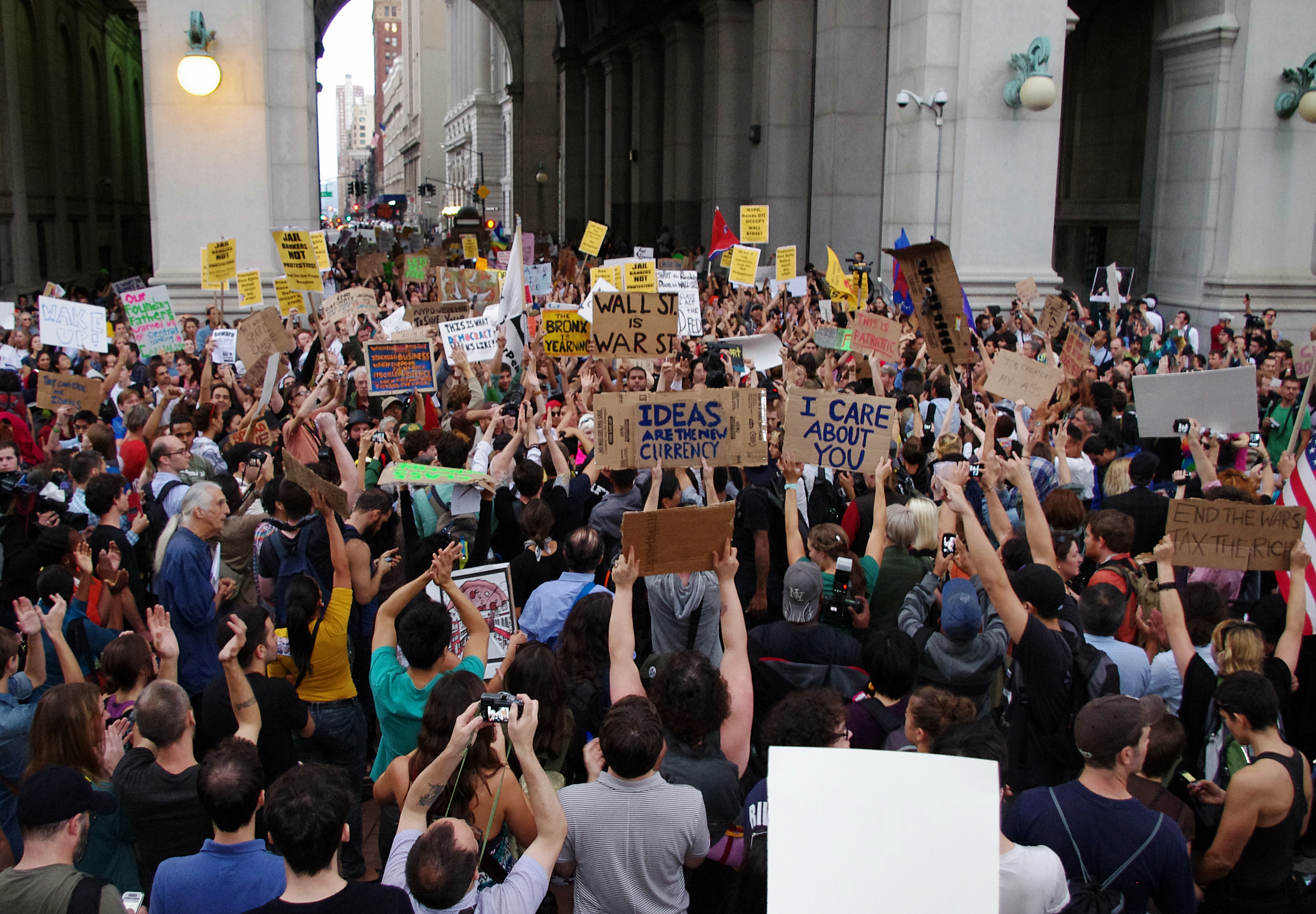
Beginning on September 17, 2011, Zuccotti Park was occupied by protesters.

Occupy Wall Street (O.W.S.) was a left-wing populist and progressive movement against economic inequality, capitalism, corporate greed, big finance, and the influence of money in politics. It began in Zuccotti Park, located in New York City's Financial District, and lasted for fifty-nine days—from September 17 to November 15, 2011.

The motivations for Occupy Wall Street largely resulted from public distrust in the private sector during the aftermath of the Great Recession in the United States. There were many particular points of interest leading up to the Occupy movement that angered populist and left-wing groups. For instance, the 2008 bank bailouts under the George W. Bush administration utilized congressionally appropriated taxpayer funds to create the Troubled Asset Relief Program (TARP), which purchased toxic assets from failing banks and financial institutions. The U.S. Supreme Court ruling in Citizens United v. FEC in January 2010 allowed corporations to spend unlimited amounts on independent political expenditures without government regulation. Many viewed the ruling as a way for moneyed interests to corrupt public institutions and legislative bodies, such as the United States Congress.

The protests gave rise to the wider Occupy movement in the United States and other countries. The Canadian anti-consumerist magazine Adbusters initiated the call for a protest. The main issues raised by Occupy Wall Street were social and economic inequality, greed, corruption and the undue influence of corporations on government—particularly from the financial services sector. The OWS slogan, "We are the 99%", refers to income and wealth inequality in the U.S. between the wealthiest 1% and the rest of the population. To achieve their goals, protesters acted on consensus-based decisions made in general assemblies which emphasized redress through direct action over the petitioning to authorities. (Note: Author Dan Berrett writes: "But Occupy Wall Street's most defining characteristics—its decentralized nature and its intensive process of participatory, consensus-based decision-making—are rooted in other precincts of academe and activism: in the scholarship of anarchism and, specifically, in an ethnography of central Madagascar.")

Press-freedom groups reported widespread interference with newsgathering during Occupy Wall Street, including arrests and detentions of working journalists, equipment seizures, and the use of force against clearly identified media in New York City and other U.S. cities. During the November 15, 2011, clearance of Zuccotti Park, major outlets reported being kept behind police perimeters and facing aggressive treatment, prompting PEN, the Committee to Protect Journalists (CPJ), and Reporters Without Borders (RSF) to document access restrictions and arrests of credentialed reporters that week.

Monitors described recurring tactics and outcomes: close-range pepper spray, strikes with batons during dispersals, and zip-tie detentions amid kettling operations; reporters also cited seizure or damage of cameras and storage media while documenting arrests. In New York, an NYPD deputy inspector's use of pepper spray at Union Square on September 24, 2011, was later found to violate departmental rules and drew discipline, and CPJ and RSF recorded additional cases in which credentialed media were pepper-sprayed or struck while filming marches. Elsewhere, news crews reported injuries while on assignment, such as a concussion sustained by a KGO-TV cameraman amid Occupy-related unrest in Oakland.

Arrests of journalists were frequently custodial and sometimes occurred after reporters identified themselves as press. By November 11, CPJ had tallied at least seven arrests nationwide; during the Zuccotti Park clearance and related operations on November 15, an Associated Press reporter and photographer were among those detained uptown. Contemporary counts put New York's total at more than two dozen journalist arrests by late November 2011. Credentialing practices also drew scrutiny: officials advised that an NYPD press pass would reduce arrest risk even as new passes were temporarily unavailable until January 2012 and required proof of crossing police lines to qualify, a standard difficult to meet without credentials. Overall, press-freedom monitors characterized 2011–2012 as a significant test of protest-coverage access and safety for U.S. journalists, centered on arrests, force, and barriers to observation rather than on protest activity itself.

==== 2014: Ferguson protests, arrests, and assaults of journalists ====
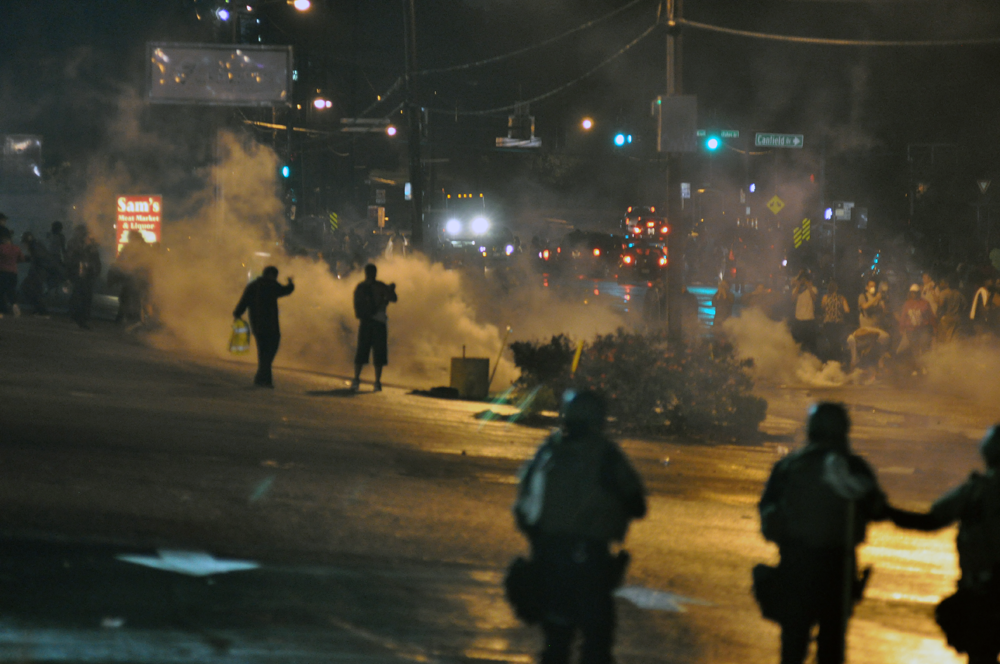
Police officers using tear gas on protesters

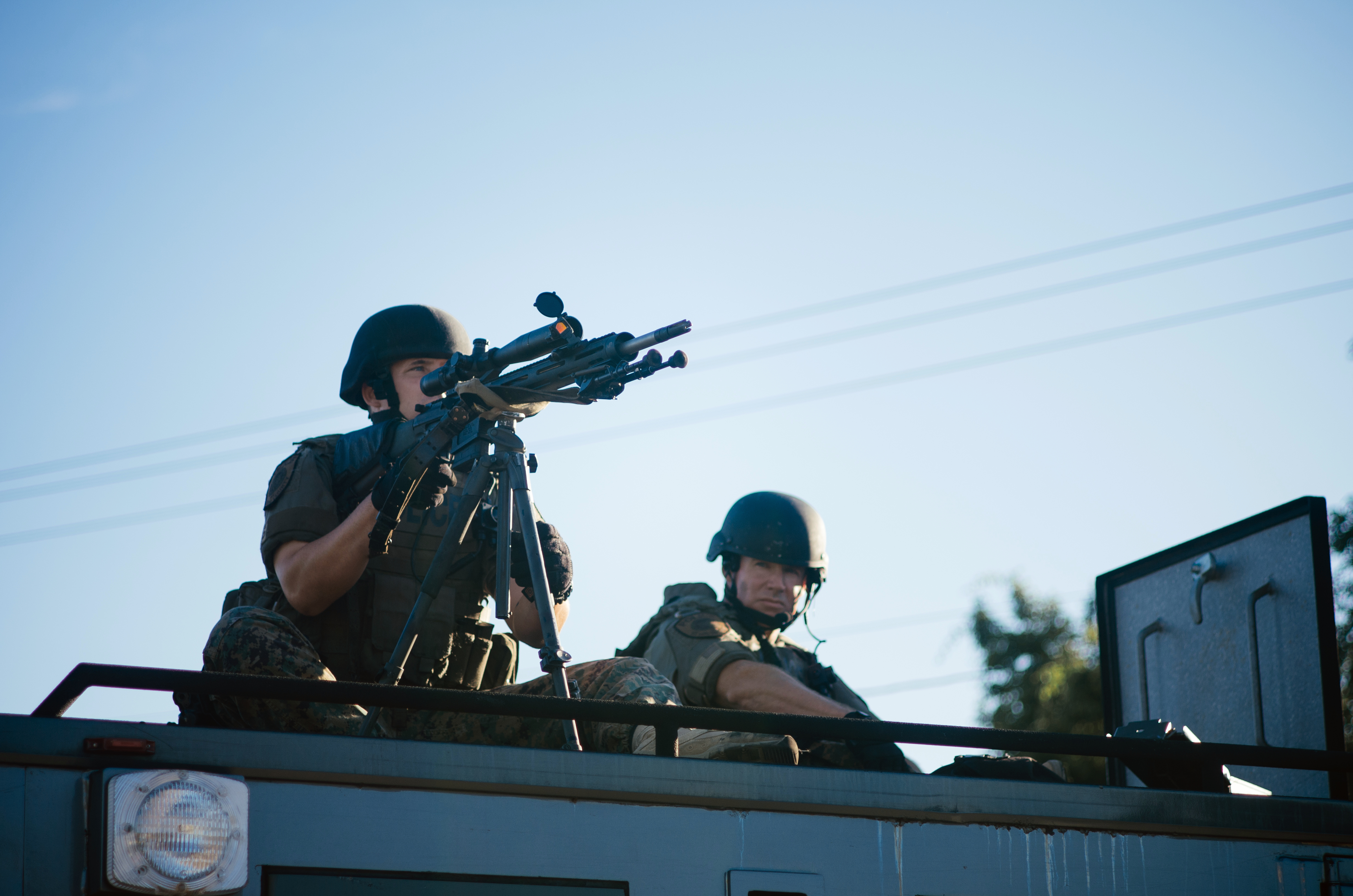
Sharpshooter, with weapon trained, atop a SWAT vehicle at the protests

The Ferguson unrest (sometimes called the Ferguson uprising, Ferguson protests, or the Ferguson riots) was a series of protests and riots which began in Ferguson, Missouri, on August 10, 2014, the day after the fatal shooting of Michael Brown by FPD officer Darren Wilson. The unrest sparked a vigorous debate in the United States about the relationship between law enforcement officers and Black Americans, the militarization of police, and the use-of-force law in Missouri and nationwide. Continuing activism expanded the issues by including modern-day debtors prisons, for-profit policing, and school segregation.

Following the police killing of Michael Brown, Governor Jay Nixon declared a state of emergency and imposed a midnight curfew on August 16, then activated the Missouri National Guard on August 18; a federal court later enjoined police from enforcing an ad-hoc "five-second rule" that required people – including reporters – to keep moving or face arrest.

Amid these conditions, multiple journalists reported physical force, chemical agents, equipment seizures, and custodial arrests while on assignment. Wesley Lowery (The Washington Post) and Ryan Reilly (HuffPost) were arrested in a McDonald's on August 13 after police ordered everyone to leave; Lowery wrote that an officer slammed him into a soda machine before cuffing him. They were released the same night; nearly a year later, local prosecutors filed misdemeanor charges, which drew press-freedom criticism.

Press-freedom groups documented incidents including pepper spray at close range, batons strikes, equipment seizures, and access restrictions during curfew and dispersal operations – comparisons were drawn to the November 15, 2011 Zuccotti Park raid "media blackout" claims during clearing operations – and on nights when tear gas and rubber bullets were widely used.

== 2016–present: Trump era ==
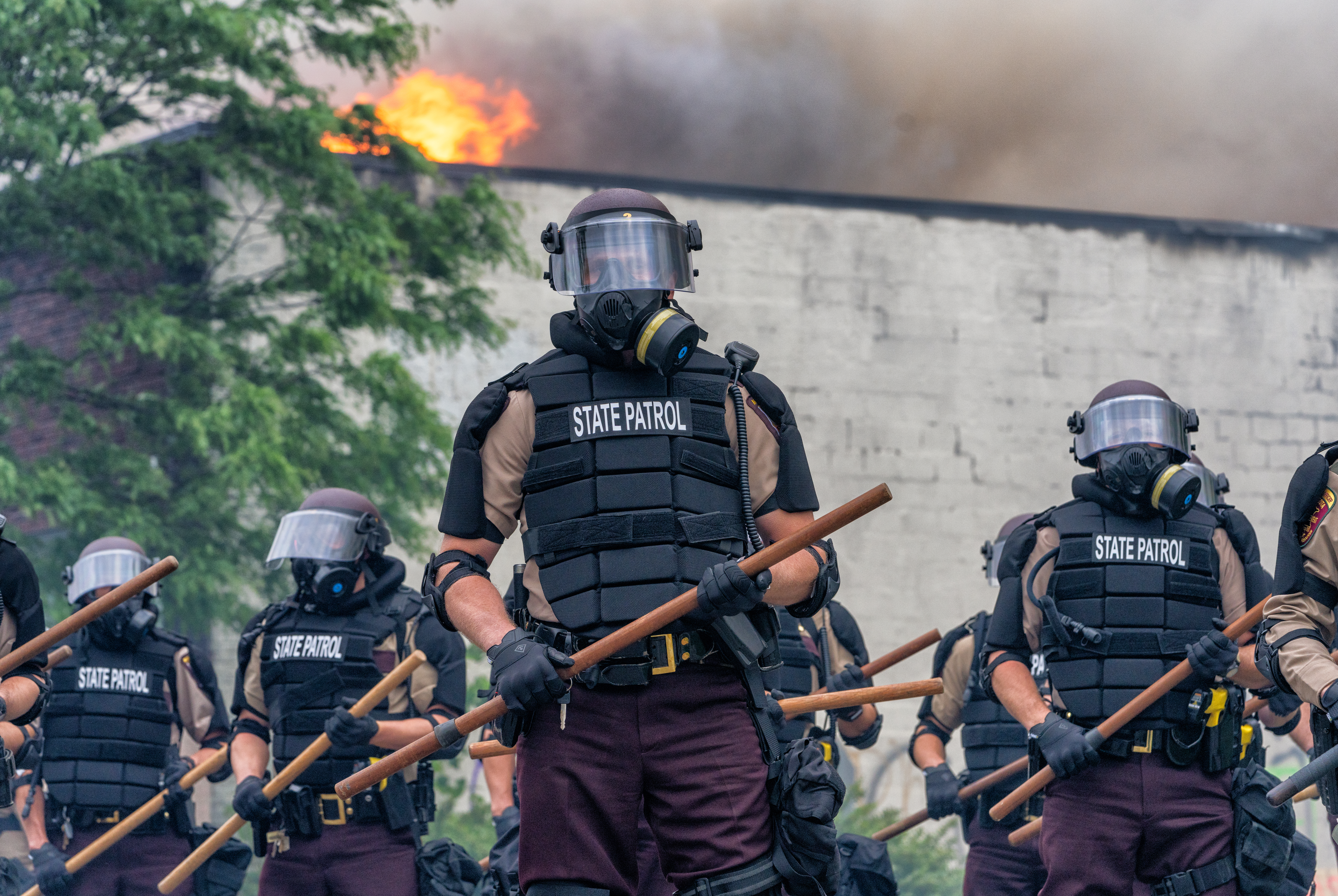
Minnesota State Patrol troopers in formation at a George Floyd protest in Minneapolis, Minnesota, where troopers arrested journalists

2025 World Press Freedom Index Good: 85–100 points Satisfactory: 70–85 points Problematic: 55–70 points Difficult: 40–55 points Very serious <40 points Not classified

Attacks against journalists have become more frequent since the Donald Trump 2016 presidential campaign, with journalists — especially those reporting on political news — being victims of assault, equipment theft and damage, detainment, arrest, cyberattacks, and doxxing at increasing rates by police, civilians, and immigration enforcement agents. Trump's actions have contributed to a significant decline in the freedom of the press. (Note: Attributed to multiple references:)

These are widely considered the result of a combination of factors. Recent police attacks against journalists have been widely attributed to militarization of police in the U.S., the degree of influence of pro-Israel lobbies and lobbyists on crackdowns on the Gaza war protests by government and university officials, and Trump's militarization and deployment of law enforcement. Civilian attacks against journalists have increased largely as a result of Trump's legal and rhetorical attacks against journalists who are critical of his platform and due to his role propagating election denial conspiracy theories, often resulting in his supporters taking violent action.

In a Pew Research survey of 11,889 U.S. journalists conducted from February 16 to March 17, 2022, 57% stated that they were "extremely" or "very" concerned about the prospect of press restrictions being imposed in the United States. The U.S.'s Reporters Without Borders (RSF) Press Freedom Index ranking fell from 20th in 2010 to 57th in 2025. According to RSF, "after a century of gradual expansion of press rights in the United States, the country is experiencing its first significant and prolonged decline in press freedom in modern history, and Donald Trump's return to the presidency is greatly exacerbating the situation." During Trump's second presidency, Immigration and Customs Enforcement (ICE) agents have repeatedly assaulted and arrested journalists, especially in connection with escalating anti-ICE protests (2025, 2026). Reporters Without Borders characterized some of the government's actions in response to recent protests as "repression typical of an authoritarian regime."

These paragraphs are an excerpt from Government attacks on journalists during the Trump presidencies § 2016–2017: Transition between Barack Obama and Donald Trump's presidencies.[edit]

=== 2016–2017: Dakota Access Pipeline attacks on journalists ===
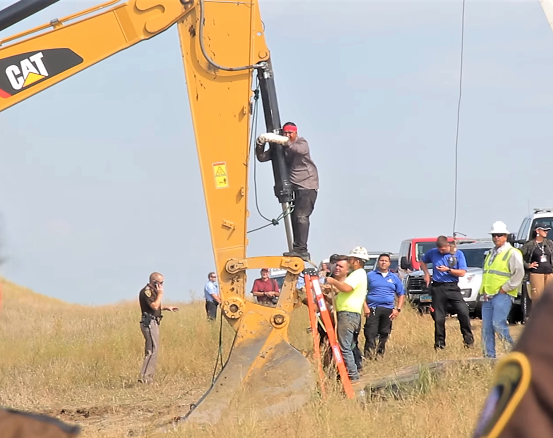
A Lakota man locks himself to construction equipment in protest.

The Dakota Access Pipeline Protests or the Standing Rock Protests, also known by the hashtag #NoDAPL, were a series of grassroots Native American protests against the construction of the Dakota Access Pipeline in the northern United States that began in April 2016. Protests ended on February 23, 2017, when National Guard and law enforcement officers evicted the last remaining protesters.

The pipeline runs from the Bakken oil fields in western North Dakota to southern Illinois, crossing beneath the Missouri and Mississippi rivers, as well as under part of Lake Oahe near the Standing Rock Sioux Reservation. Many members of the Standing Rock Sioux Tribe and surrounding communities consider the pipeline to be a serious threat to the region's water. The construction also directly threatens ancient burial grounds and cultural sites of historic importance.

The protests were not successful and the pipeline came online in May 2017. In 2025, a North Dakota jury found that Greenpeace USA and Greenpeace International had committed trespass, nuisance, civil conspiracy and other acts against Energy Transfer LP, the pipeline's builder. The court ordered Greenpeace to pay $345 million in damages. As of 2026, litigation is ongoing.

During Obama's presidency, as protests swelled in fall 2016, authorities brought criminal cases against working journalists. On September 12, 2016, a North Dakota state's attorney sought a warrant for Amy Goodman of Democracy Now! after she filmed private security guards using dogs on demonstrators; prosecutors later amended the allegation to "riot," and a judge dismissed the case on October 17 for lack of probable cause. On October 11-12, 2016, documentary filmmaker Deia Schlosberg was arrested while covering coordinated pipeline actions and charged with multiple conspiracy counts; the charges, criticized by press-freedom groups, were dropped several weeks later.

Border officials also impeded coverage. On October 1, 2016, Canadian photojournalist Ed Ou was detained for six hours at the Canada–United States border, had his phones and storage media seized, and was denied entry en route to Standing Rock — an incident the ACLU said chilled newsgathering. By late 2016 and into early 2017, CPJ documented a pattern of freelancers and small-outlet reporters charged with trespass or riot while covering the protests, warning that arrests deterred coverage even when journalists said they were following police instructions.

After the change in administrations, arrests and prosecutions continued as authorities moved to clear the camps. On February 1, 2017, freelance reporter Jenni Monet (Laguna Pueblo) was arrested while covering a camp clearance and charged with criminal trespass and engaging in a riot; press-freedom groups highlighted her case as emblematic of risks facing independent reporters covering the protests. During the February 23, 2017, eviction of the main camp, independent photojournalist Tracie Williams was arrested while documenting the operation and had her phone, camera bodies, lenses, batteries, and storage media seized as evidence; outlets simultaneously described a heavily armed, militarized law-enforcement posture during the clearance.

=== 2017: Inauguration Day violence and prosecution against journalists ===
A large number of protests were planned in connection with the first inauguration of Donald Trump as president on January 20, 2017. Security preparation for Trump's inauguration gathered nearly 28,000 security personnel to participate in Washington, D.C. The vast majority of protesters, several thousand in all, were peaceful; however, many violent acts, such as property destruction, occurred. DisruptJ20 protesters linked arms at security checkpoints and attempted to shut them down. Some elements of the protesters were black bloc groups and self-described anarchists, and engaged in sporadic acts of vandalism, rioting, and violence.

During the end of Obama's term on January 20, 2017, Metropolitan Police Department (MPD) officers conducted a large kettle near 12th and L Streets NW during protest dispersals, encircling and arresting more than 200 people, among them working reporters and photojournalists. Journalists on assignment described being shoved or struck during line pushes, subjected to close-range pepper spray and blast devices, and having cameras or protective gear seized or damaged — even while clearly identifying as press. Litigators alleged mass arrest tactics were used and that limited dispersal opportunities were provided prior to the kettle.

After Trump's term began, prosecutors at the U.S. Attorney's Office for D.C. brought felony "rioting" and related charges against dozens of arrestees, including several journalists. Early charging decisions swept up reporters such as Evan Engel of Vocativ and Alexei Wood, even as other journalists saw charges quickly dropped; within days, prosecutors also dismissed cases against Alexander Rubinstein (RT America) and documentary producer Jack Keller. The first protest trial ended with acquittals — including for photojournalist Alexei Wood — and, by mid-2018, the government dismissed the remaining cases against the last defendants, among them Rubinstein and Keller.

Oversight and civil suits culminated in policy changes and monetary relief. In 2021, the District of Columbia agreed to pay $1.6 million and adopt reforms — including training, limits on the use of pepper spray, and clearer dispersal-order practices — resolving claims stemming from the mass arrest and related use-of-force incidents against demonstrators and members of the press.

These paragraphs are an excerpt from Government attacks on journalists during the Trump presidencies § 2017–2021: Donald Trump's first presidency.[edit]

=== 2019: Puerto Rico summer protests violence against journalists ===
As nightly crowds converged on Old San Juan during the July 2019 protests calling for Governor Ricardo Rosselló's resignation, the Puerto Rico Police Bureau used tear gas, pepper spray, and "less-lethal" impact munitions to clear the narrow streets around La Fortaleza. International and local outlets on scene documented baton charges and chemical agents deployed in tight corridors; reporters and camera crews working amid the crowd described being swept up in dispersals, forced back by lines of officers, and struggling to protect equipment as gas and projectiles filled the area.

Newsrooms and press-freedom advocates criticized the lack of media accommodation as officers repeatedly pushed protest lines back from the Fortaleza perimeter; coverage noted journalists' exposure to tear gas and close-quarters shoves during arrests and street clearances, and damage to cameras and protective gear consistent with the force used to disperse crowds.

=== 2020: George Floyd protests police violence against journalists ===
Projectiles being fired at journalists and other members of the press during the George Floyd protests in Washington, D.C.

Protests, riots, and demonstrations against police brutality began in Minneapolis in the United States on May 26, 2020 as reactions to the murder of George Floyd, a 46-year-old unarmed African American man, by city police during an arrest. They spread nationally and internationally. Veteran officer Derek Chauvin was recorded as kneeling on Floyd's neck for 9 minutes and 29 seconds; Floyd complained of not being able to breathe, but three other officers looked on and prevented passersby from intervening. Chauvin and the other three officers involved were fired and later arrested. In April 2021, Chauvin was found guilty of second-degree murder, third-degree murder, and second-degree manslaughter. In June 2021, Chauvin was sentenced to 22 1/2 years in prison.

The George Floyd protest movement began hours after his murder as bystander video and word of mouth began to spread. Protests first emerged at the East 38th and Chicago Avenue street intersection in Minneapolis, the location of Floyd's arrest and murder, and other sites in the Minneapolis–Saint Paul metropolitan area of Minnesota. Protests quickly spread nationwide and to over 2,000 cities and towns in over 60 countries in support of the Black Lives Matter (BLM) movement. Polls in the summer of 2020 estimated that between 15 million and 26 million people had participated at some point in the demonstrations in the United States, making the protests the largest in U.S. history.

During the 2020 demonstrations, press-freedom monitors documented widespread interference with newsgathering, including assaults, custodial arrests, equipment seizures, and access denials affecting local, national, and foreign media — even when reporters displayed visible credentials. The U.S. Press Freedom Tracker recorded hundreds of incidents nationwide in its special dataset on protest coverage, a trend also analyzed by Columbia Journalism Review.

Several incidents drew international attention. In Minneapolis, freelance photojournalist Linda Tirado suffered permanent injury to her eye after being struck by a projectile while photographing confrontations, and a Reuters TV crew reported being hit by rubber bullets, injuring a cameraman and damaging equipment. A CNN crew led by correspondent Omar Jimenez was arrested live on air by the Minnesota State Patrol and released shortly afterward; the governor later apologized. In Lafayette Square, an Australian 7NEWS reporter and cameraman were shoved and struck by police with shields and batons while broadcasting, prompting a diplomatic complaint by Australia.

Litigation arising from protest coverage led courts to restrict police tactics against clearly identified journalists. In Portland, Oregon, a federal court barred city police — and later federal agents — from arresting, dispersing, or using force against journalists and legal observers absent probable cause of a crime. Elsewhere, newsrooms and press advocates reported baton strikes, close-range pepper spray, zip-tie detentions, and seizures or destruction of cameras and protective gear; subsequent rulings and settlements in several jurisdictions curtailed force against the news media and mandated training. In Minneapolis, officers from the Minnesota State Patrol and Anoka County Sheriff's Office acknowledged slashing tires on parked vehicles, including those used by media.

External videos
- Inside the Capitol Hill Riots. VICE News. January 9, 2021. — Journalists attacked by rioters

Press-freedom organizations characterized 2020 as a stress test for protest newsgathering. Reporting estimated hundreds of arrests and more than one hundred injuries attributable to police actions against the media, while the Committee to Protect Journalists warned that militarized protest policing created a hostile environment that risked chilling coverage. Between May 28 and June 1, U.S. Press Freedom Tracker reported a variety of attacks on press, including 49 arrests, 42 instances of destruction of equipment, 69 physical attacks (43 by officers), 43 tear gassings, 24 pepper sprayings, and 77 rubber bullet incidents. Reporters Without Borders characterized this as an "unprecedented outbreak of violence."

=== 2021–2024: Joe Biden's presidency ===
==== 2021: Daunte Wright protests police violence against journalists ====
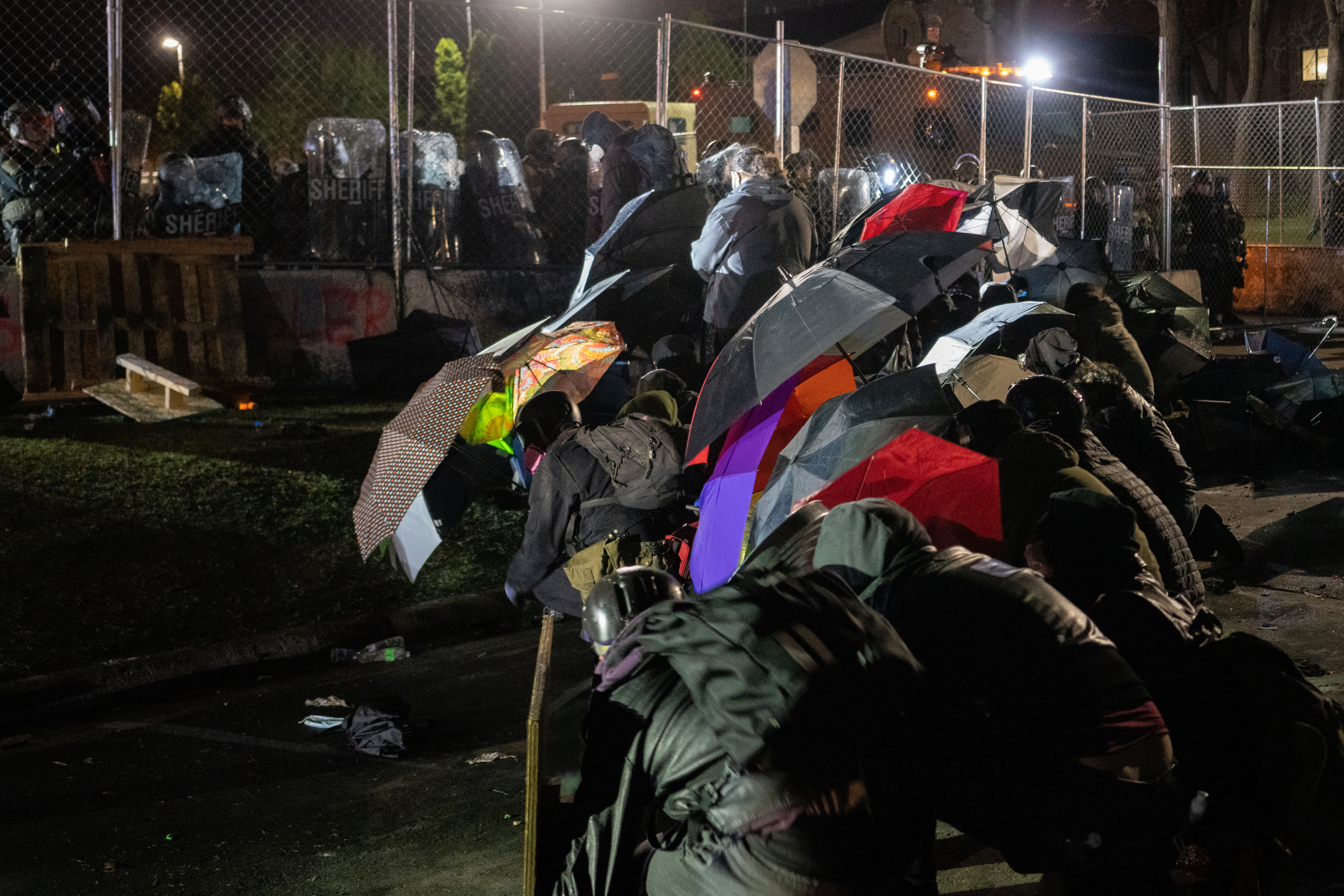
Demonstrators shield themselves from tear gas, April 14, 2021

Protests and civil disorder occurred in reaction to the killing of Daunte Wright on April 11, 2021. Wright, a 20-year-old Black man, was fatally shot by police officer Kimberly Potter during a traffic stop in Brooklyn Center, Minnesota, United States. Protests that first began in Brooklyn Center spread to other locations in the Minneapolis–Saint Paul metropolitan area and then to other cities in the United States. Several nights of civil disorder in Brooklyn Center and adjacent cities resulted in sporadic looting and damage to several hundred properties, including four businesses that were set on fire.

During the April 2021 demonstrations in Brooklyn Center, Minnesota, journalists reported force, detentions, and arrests by the Minnesota State Patrol and partnering agencies despite displaying press credentials. Documented cases included CNN producer Carolyn Sung being thrown to the ground, zip-tied, and jailed; The New York Times freelancer Joshua Rashaad McFadden detained and tackled; and WCCO-TV journalists ordered to lie prone and "processed" at a checkpoint. Local coverage the same weekend also reported "journalists detained" amid mass arrest operations.

On April 16, 2021, U.S. District Judge Wilhelmina Wright issued a temporary restraining order in Goyette v. City of Minneapolis barring state officials from arresting, threatening, or using force on clearly identified members of the press and clarifying that dispersal orders did not apply to journalists; nevertheless, reporters described continued mass detentions and the photographing of journalists and their credentials that night. The ACLU of Minnesota publicized the order, and the Reporters Committee for Freedom of the Press criticized the credential-photography practice; amid criticism, the State Patrol said it would stop detaining, pepper-spraying, or photographing journalists. Subsequent tallies indicate that at least 21 journalists were detained across three days in Brooklyn Center.

==== February 2024: Tim Burke ====
Timothy Burke is an American sports journalist and media consultant who is known for his video and GIF clips. He was a staffer for Deadspin from 2011 to 2018 and runs a consulting firm based out of Tampa, Florida. Burke was arrested and indicted on federal charges of conspiracy in February 2024 following the publication of unaired footage from Fox News talk show Tucker Carlson Tonight, which prompted an FBI search of his home.

==== April 2024: UT Austin police attack against Gaza war protest journalists ====
Police tackle and arrest a Fox 7 reporter at a pro-Palestinian protest at UT Austin.

Pro-Palestinian protests at the University of Texas at Austin (UT Austin) began on April 24, 2024, organized by the Palestinian Solidarity Committee in response to the ongoing Gaza war. The protests have included sit-ins, marches, and encampments on campus, calling for the university to divest from companies linked to Israel's actions in Gaza. The demonstrations escalated when university officials, with support from local and state law enforcement, intervened to disperse protestors, leading to multiple arrests and sparking criticism over the suppression of free speech on campus. Despite arrests and clashes with police, the protests have continued, drawing significant attention and raising debates about civil liberties and the role of university administration in managing campus protests.

A photojournalist for Fox 7 Austin was detained during the protest after reportedly becoming caught in a scuffle between law enforcement and students. Fox 7 Austin shared video footage of the incident on social media, stating the employee was pushed by an officer into another before being thrown to the ground and arrested. Another Texas journalist was knocked down during the police response, sustaining visible bleeding before being handed off to emergency medical staff by officers.

These paragraphs are an excerpt from Government attacks on journalists during the Trump presidencies § 2025–present: Donald Trump's second presidency.[edit]

=== April–May 2025: Columbia University Gaza war protest journalist arrests ===
Police tackle and arrest a Fox 7 reporter at the April 24th protest.

On May 7, 2025, pro-Palestinian protesters occupied Room 301 of Butler Library at Columbia University, renaming it the "Basel Al-Araj Popular University" for Palestinian activist Bassel al-Araj. Columbia Public Safety blocked exits, demanding university identification under threat of trespassing arrests, creating a standoff. Acting president Claire Shipman summoned the NYPD, whose officers in riot gear arrested 78 people — the university's largest mass arrest since April 2024. Witnesses described the police response as forceful and violent, with two people removed on stretchers, one wearing a kuffiyeh.

Following the sweep, Columbia suspended over 65 students and barred 33 more, including journalists from student outlets Columbia Daily Spectator and WKCR, under interim suspension orders. These student reporters had been present to cover the protest and were arrested under the same disciplinary action as participants.

=== June 2025: Los Angeles protests police attacks against journalists ===
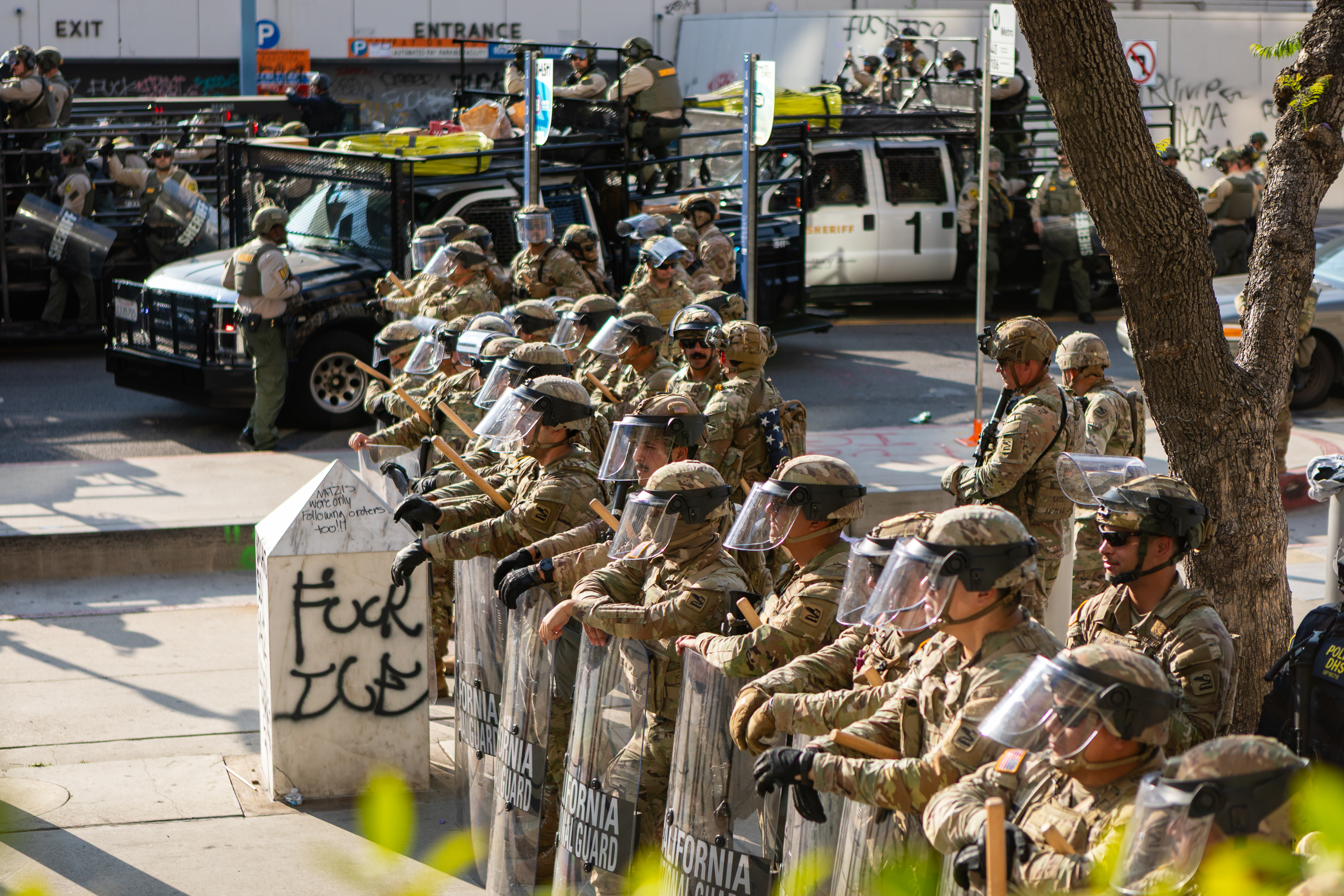
California National Guardsmen in Los Angeles on June 12

On June 7, protestors and federal law enforcement agents clashed in Paramount and Compton during raids. President Donald Trump responded by federalizing the California National Guard, calling for 2,000 guard members to deploy to the city under Joint Task Force 51. Protests were organized and attended by multiple groups and unaffiliated protestors. On June 9, the president authorized the deployment of an additional 2,000 National Guard members, and the Pentagon activated 700 Marines to deploy to the city, who arrived the next day. Critics, including California governor Gavin Newsom (who has sued Trump over the federalization), described the military response as premature, inflammatory, for political gain, and authoritarian. Reuters reported that the protests were the strongest domestic backlash to Trump since he took office in January, and became a focal point in a national debate over immigration, protest, the use of federal force in domestic affairs, the boundaries of presidential power, and freedom of speech and assembly.

The Associated Press reported that by June 10, over two dozen journalists had been arrested or "roughed up" by law enforcement, leading press freedom groups to question whether or not they were being deliberately targeted. Reporters Without Borders reported 35 attacks on journalists, of which 30 were from law enforcement. The Committee to Protect Journalists, the First Amendment Coalition, and Freedom of the Press Foundation expressed concern in a letter to DHS Secretary Kristi Noem that "federal officers appear to have deliberately targeted journalists who were doing nothing more than their job covering the news." The secretary of the Los Angeles Press Club reported that the organization had documented more than 30 incidents where police actions affected reporters, photographers, and other media professionals, ranging from searching their materials and bags to firing tear gas and rubber bullets, and said the club was aware of 20 injuries to journalists during the protests, including at least five requiring medical attention.

Australian journalists

On June 8, Lauren Tomasi, a reporter for Australia's Nine News, was struck on the leg by a rubber bullet while reporting on the protests outside the Metropolitan Detention Center in downtown Los Angeles, where police were beginning to disperse the protesters. Australian Prime Minister Anthony Albanese called the shooting "targeted" and said he had raised the issue with the Trump administration. The Australian Department of Foreign Affairs and Trade released a statement declaring that "all journalists should be able to do their work safely". Albanese also described the footage of the reporter being shot by an officer as "horrific" and said he intended to raise the issue with the Trump administration over the incident. Albanese and senator Matt Canavan both said Tomasi's shooting appeared targeted, with Canavan adding he had only seen part of the footage and was "loth to jump to conclusions".

That same day, while covering the protests, crew members from the Australian Broadcasting Corporation were struck by tear gas. On June 10, the same crew were struck by pepper pellets, and a cameraman from Channel Nine was shot at.

Chinese journalists

On June 8, while covering protests in downtown Los Angeles, a Xinhua News Agency reporter was hit twice by tear gas canisters, while a photojournalist was struck in the left leg by rubber bullets, resulting in a bruised and swollen wound.

South Korean journalists

SBS reported on June 11 that one of their reporters was hit by police-fired rubber bullets during a protest.

United Kingdom journalists

On June 7, British reporter and photographer Nick Stern was shot with a less-than-lethal 3-inch (75 mm) projectile. He suffered an open wound and underwent emergency surgery on June 8. His injuries will require physical therapy.

On June 9, an ITV presenter for the program Good Morning Britain was shot with a rubber bullet during a broadcast segment.

United States journalists

On June 7, World Socialist Web Site reporters reportedly sustained injuries while documenting the protests, including a reporter who was shot in the back with a rubber bullet by a US immigration officer. That same day, a reporter with the Southern California News Group reported that she had been shot by officers with pepper ball bullets.

On June 8, a reporter for The New York Times was shot at but was not seriously injured. On June 9, Toby Canham, a news photographer with the New York Post was recording California Highway Patrol officers stationed under a freeway to document the protests and response. While filming, one of the California Highway Patrol officers reportedly turned their weapon towards the gathered reporters and shot, striking Canham in the forehead with a rubber bullet.

On June 10, crime reporter Ryanne Mena and videographer Sean Beckner-Carmitchel for the Los Angeles Daily News were shot by non-lethal rounds.

=== September 2025: ICE agents assault journalists outside immigration court ===
On September 30, 2025, journalists were in a hallway outside the immigration courtroom in 26 Federal Plaza, where ICE agents grabbed and shoved journalists.

One journalist, Dean Moses of amNewYork, was pushed off a public elevator while trying to take a photograph of a woman from Peru being arrested who had just left the immigration court. One agent wearing a mask and bulletproof vest labeled "police" grabbed Moses and told him "get the fuck off the elevator." Moses later claimed "I walked into the elevator behind them, and they started screaming at me... Then they pushed me, grabbed me by my arms, and started pulling me out of the elevator. I tried to hold on, but I got shoved out." Moses also alleged it seemed like the agents "didn't want to be seen taking this person."

A freelance journalist who had previously done work for the Associated Press, Olga Fedorova, was shoved to the floor during the struggle between police and Moses. Fedorova claimed no limits were announced on where journalists could go and that there was no warning issued to press not to go on the elevator.

A third journalist, L. Vural Elibol of Turkish news agency Anadolu, sustained injuries after hitting his head against the floor due to being pushed by an ICE agent. Paramedics put him in a neck brace and escorted him out of the building on a stretcher.

A later statement by Homeland Security Assistant Secretary Tricia McLaughlin asserted officers were "swarmed by agitators and members of the press," whom she claimed they warned to move back and get off the elevator citing "concerns with our officers' safety." Democratic politicians denounced the incident, including Kathy Hochul and Hakeem Jeffries. Then-candidate for mayor Zohran Mamdani said "we cannot accept or normalize what has now become routine violence at 26 Federal Plaza." Murad Awawdeh, president of the New York Immigration Coalition also criticized the conflict as indicative of violence becoming the norm in places where due process is upheld. The incident was also condemned by the Society of Professional Journalists.

=== September 2025–present: Operation Midway Blitz attacks on journalists ===
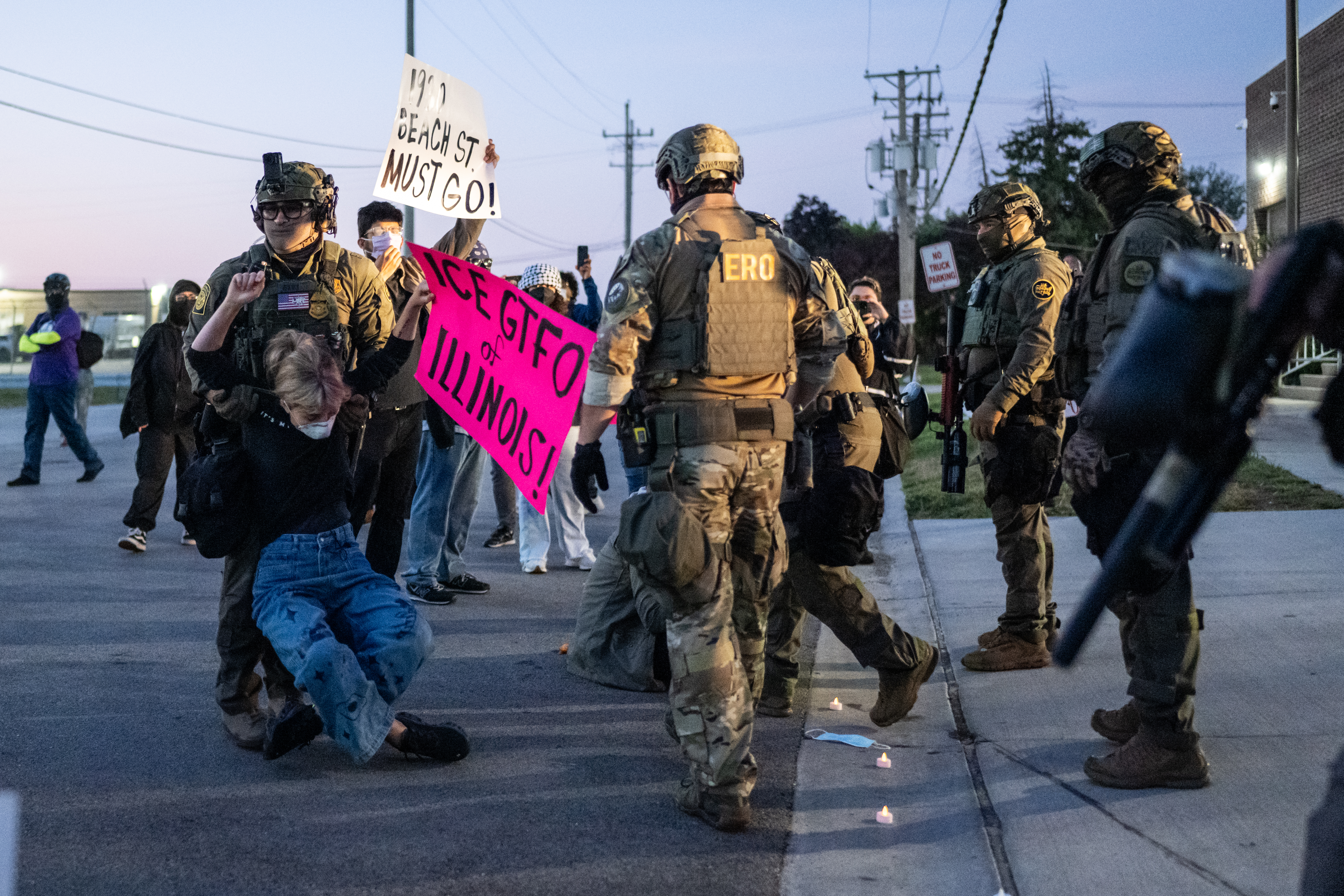
Journalist and House of Representatives candidate Kat Abughazaleh protesting at the ICE Broadview processing center during Operation Midway Blitz

Operation Midway Blitz is an operation by the United States Immigration and Customs Enforcement (ICE) conducted in and around Chicago, Illinois, starting on September 8, 2025. The United States Department of Homeland Security (DHS) stated that the operation will arrest illegal immigrants with criminal records and is intended to crack down on sanctuary policies. Hundreds of DHS agents used a nearby naval base as a staging area.

On September 26, ICE agents shot journalists covering a demonstration with rubber projectiles and chemical agents. One journalist at newly-founded news outlet Unraveled Press was arrested and was released by authorities later that night. His colleague, according to Block Club Chicago, was "shot in the face with a pepper ball by federal officers" and needed medical attention.

On September 29, a journalist in a truck at WBBM-TV (CBS News Chicago) was shot at with a pepper-spray projectile by a masked ICE agent as she drove by the entrance of an ICE facility. She expressed it was not clear why the agent shot at her. The chemicals "engulfed the inside of her truck."

On October 9, a temporary restraining order was issued by a federal judge in Illinois to "bar federal agents from using force or threatening to arrest journalists in Chicago."

On October 10, there was an ICE raid in Lincoln Square, Chicago. A Homeland Security spokesperson claimed that after officers drove their cars into a "suspect's vehicle," a video editor for WGN-TV named Debbie Brockman threw objects at the car driven by officers, saying this qualified as assaulting federal officers. This report was disputed by multiple witnesses, one of whom claimed she was "like all of us, just standing there, taking a video" and not obstructing justice. Other witnesses claimed Brockman was filming federal agents after they detained a Latino man and that after Brockman asked agents to present an arrest warrant, the agents detained her. According to The Guardian, Brockman was recorded being "violently forced to the ground by two agents before she was handcuffed and put in a van." Another video showed that after federal agents put their hands on Brockman's face and neck, bystanders yelled to stop saying she couldn't breathe. One local resident who witnessed the event said the incident was "the most frightening thing I had ever seen in Chicago." Brockman was later released without charges.

These incidents have been condemned by advocacy groups including the Society of Professional Journalists and the Knight Foundation at Columbia University. Chicago journalists and unions filed a lawsuit against ICE and the Department of Homeland Security, alleging that the federal government used "extreme force" against reporters and television crews during protests in Broadview, Illinois. The village of Broadview also filed a lawsuit over fencing surrounding the facility, and three criminal investigations into ICE activity.

=== October 2025: Deportation of Mario Guevara ===
Mario Guevara is a Salvadoran journalist and asylum seeker who was deported from the United States in October 2025.

Guevara worked in El Salvador until fleeing the country with his family in 2004 due to political persecution. He then became a resident in the United States, where he mostly reported on the topic of immigration in Atlanta. He was nominated for and won multiple Southeast Emmy Awards. Guevara was ordered removed from the United States by an immigration judge in 2012. He worked for Mundo Hispánico until founding MG News in 2024.

In the past, Guevara had spoken favorably of Republican candidates and policies. In 2022, he said that then-Republican gubernatorial candidate Brian Kemp's victory over Democratic candidate Stacey Abrams would prevent what he described as the Democratic Party's plan of "eradicating" the police in the state of Georgia, even though Abrams had in reality intended to increase police funding. Guevara endorsed Republican insurance commissioner candidate John King, saying that "a lot of our Latino people are conservative" and wishing him four more years in office. In a Facebook live, Guevara said that "a lot of people talk about Republicans being racist... But frankly Georgia Republicans now aren’t the same" as before.

After working as a reporter in Atlanta for about 18 years, Guevara was arrested by Doraville police during his coverage of a No Kings protest in June 2025. Charges against him were dropped and he was taken into ICE custody in order to undergo deportation proceedings. The case was appealed and subsequently closed. Guevara held a work visa and had a pending green card application as of September 2025.

Guevara's case garnered a large number of followers on social media due to his coverage of immigration raids. He remained in detention for over 100 days. The ACLU described his detention and prosecution as political censorship. His detention was opposed by the University of Georgia's First Amendment Clinic, the Society of Professional Journalists, the Committee to Protect Journalists and other journalistic freedom organizations.

Guevara was deported to El Salvador in October 2025. As of January of the following year, he was still reporting on United States immigration issues from outside the United States.

=== October 2025: Detention of Sami Hamdi ===
Sami Hamdi (born July 1990) is a British journalist, political commentator, and risk‑intelligence advisor.

On 26 October 2025, Hamdi was detained by the U.S. Immigration and Customs Enforcement (ICE) at San Francisco International Airport while on a speaking tour in the United States. His U.S. visa was revoked the day before his detention.

A spokesperson for the US Department of Homeland Security, a parent agency of ICE, falsely accused Hamdi of "supporting terrorism" and said that "This individual's visa was revoked, and he is in ICE custody pending removal". The spokesperson cited a report by RAIR Foundation, described by the Southern Poverty Law Center as an anti-Muslim hate group. Far-right conspiracy theorist Laura Loomer claimed credit for the detention.

=== January 2026: FBI raid journalist's home ===
On January 14, 2026, the Federal Bureau of Investigation (FBI) raided the home of Washington Post journalist Hannah Natanson in Virginia and seized her phone, digital watch, and two laptop computers. Federal agents showed up at her door unannounced.

The warrant said a contractor in the Pentagon, former Navy veteran Aurelio Perez-Lugones, had leaked information to Natanson and was now "behind bars". Perez-Lugones is a system administrator in Maryland. Perez-Lugones possesses "Top Secret security clearance" and was accused by the federal government of printing or taking screenshots of classified databases without authorization.

The material was allegedly "related to a foreign country" and "national defense". Shortly after the arrest, Trump said "the leaker on Venezuela" had been arrested, but it is not confirmed he was talking about Perez-Lugones. The incident occurred shortly after the 2026 United States intervention in Venezuela.

After the incident, executive editor of the Post Matt Murray sent an email to staff calling the action "extraordinary", "aggressive", and "deeply concerning", saying it "raises profound questions and concern around the constitutional protections for our work". The incident was also denounced by former Post executive editor Martin Baron, and many press freedom groups, including the Reporters Committee for Freedom of the Press, the Knight First Amendment Institute, the Freedom of the Press Foundation, PEN America, the American Enterprise Institute, the American Civil Liberties Union, Reporters Without Borders, the Society of Professional Journalists, the Reporters Committee for Freedom of the Press, and the Freedom Forum.

Former top Justice Department spokeswoman Xochitl Hinojosa said "the reporter is NOT the 'leaker'". A 2001 Supreme Court case Bartnicki v. Vopper established protections for "a person's right to disclose illegally intercepted communications if they were not part of the illegal interception itself", and the Privacy Protection Act of 1980 requires the government to get a subpoena to obtain journalist work products. However, the Espionage Act of 1917 makes it illegal to obtain information relating to national defense with the intent of using that information against the United States for the gain of any foreign nation.

=== January 2026: Don Lemon Cities Church arrest and charges ===
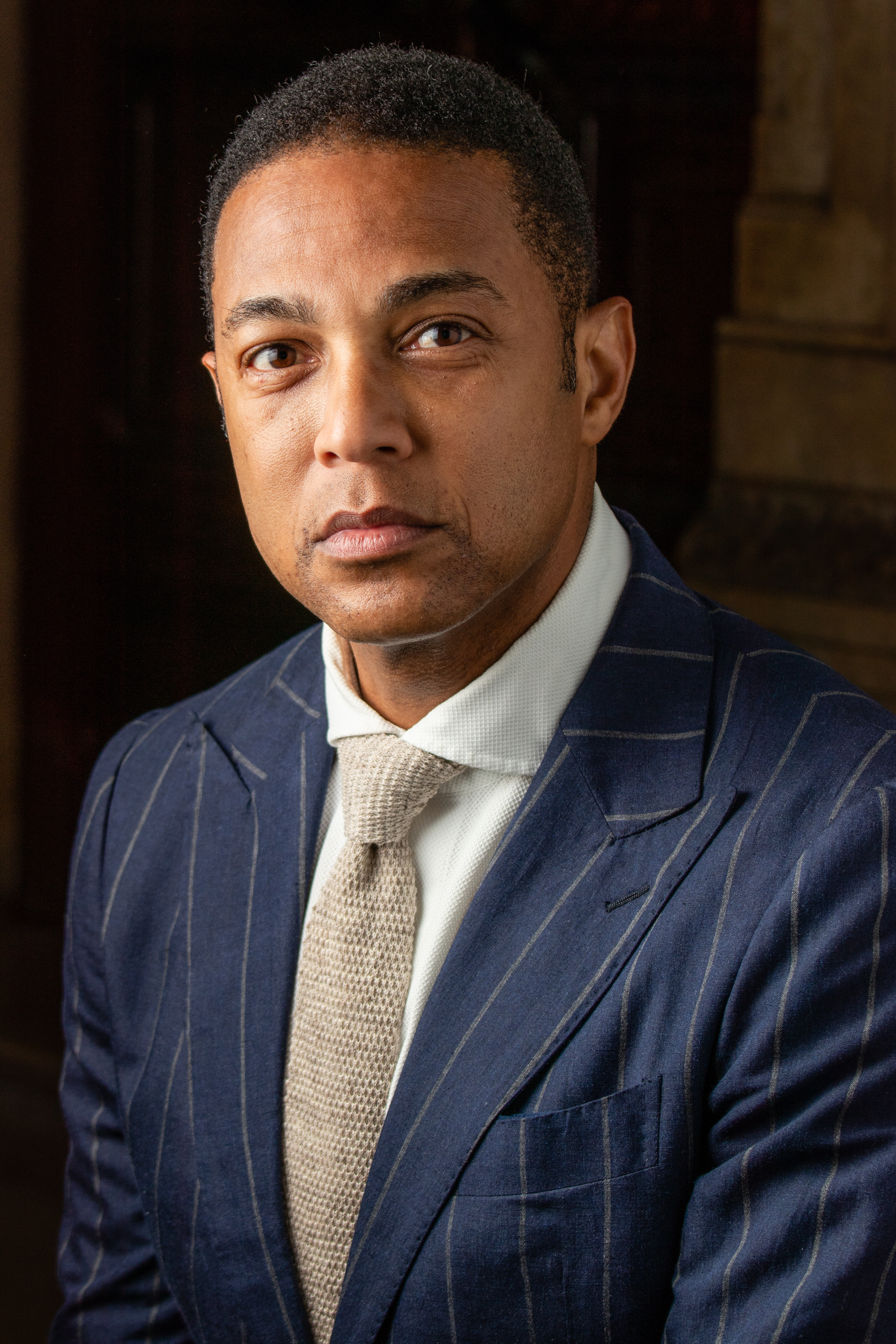
Lemon in 2018

On January 18, 2026, Lemon livestreamed an anti-ICE protest inside Cities Church in Saint Paul, Minnesota, during a worship service. Activists alleged that a pastor associated with the church also held a leadership role within U.S. Immigration and Customs Enforcement (ICE). Lemon interviewed protesters and congregants during a multi-hour livestream.

Following the protest, officials within the U.S. Department of Justice sought to bring federal charges against Lemon and Georgia Fort, an independent journalist from Minnesota who also covered the protest. According to reporting, prosecutors considered charging him under the Freedom of Access to Clinic Entrances Act (FACE Act), codified at 18 U.S.C. §248, which prohibits the use of force, threat of force, or physical obstruction to interfere with a person's exercise of religious worship; and under 18 U.S.C. §241, a Reconstruction-era civil rights conspiracy statute commonly associated with the Ku Klux Klan Act.

A federal magistrate judge declined to approve the proposed criminal complaint, saying the government had not presented sufficient probable cause at that stage. Lemon said he was present as a journalist, and his attorney argued his conduct was protected by the First Amendment. Speaking on Jimmy Kimmel Live!, he said that his attorney had told authorities he would turn himself in, but that offer went unacknowledged.

On January 29, 2026, a federal grand jury returned an indictment and federal law enforcement surprised Lemon in a hotel lobby and took him into custody. Four others linked to the protest, including Georgia Fort, were arrested separately. Lemon was released without being required to post a bond on January 30, 2026 and said that "he will not be silenced". On February 13, 2026, while appearing before Minnesota-based Magistrate Judge Douglas L. Micko, Lemon pled not guilty.

Don Lemon's arrest has drawn a strong response from free speech advocacy groups and press freedom groups, with the National Press Club and PEN America saying, "journalism is not a crime".

The ACLU described the move as a serious threat to freedom of the press and the First Amendment. Isha Bhandari, director of the ACLU's Speech, Privacy, and Technology Project, said the prosecution of the journalists, after a federal judge denied their arrest warrants, sends a chilling message of pressure and intimidation.

Former US Vice President Kamala Harris referred to the arrest of Don Lemon and other independent journalists by the Trump administration as an "affront to rights and freedoms". Harris said the arrest of the journalists by the Trump administration represented the suppression of a critical press.

Licensed attorney Eric Rassbach of the Becket law firm expressed skepticism of Lemon's defense in The Wall Street Journal. He said, "neither journalists nor protesters enjoy any constitutional right to invade someone else's private space to report on the news or proclaim their message."

=== March 2026: Arrest of Nashville reporter ===
On March 5, 2026, ICE agents detained and arrested reporter Estefany Rodríguez while she was driving to the gym. Trucks surrounded her car in traffic before immigration enforcement agents approached her window. They claim no warrant was produced for her arrest, which ICE denies, and she was instead presented with a Notice to Appear — the first step in the deportation process. During the arrest, she was in the car with her husband, a US citizen.

Rodríguez had spent months covering immigration raids in Tennessee. Rodríguez had a Spanish-language outlet named Nashville Noticias that had been critical of the Trump administration. Originally from Colombia, Rodríguez entered the US legally on a tourist visa in 2021. She has a pending political asylum claim after receiving death threats related to reporting on corruption in the Colombian government. She was in the process of applying for permanent residency in the United States. According to her husband, she moved to the US in 2021 because she wanted to protect her then one-year-old daughter.

Rodríguez' husband claimed this is "retaliation" for her reporting critical of the Trump administration. They were in the process of going through immigration hearings but when they were ready for an appointment, the office was shut down due to an ice storm, so they rescheduled her for an appointment on March 17, but she was arrested before she could make that hearing.

She is believed to be held in a federal immigration detention center in Louisiana after being originally placed in Alabama. Her husband has been unable to speak with her since the arrest, saying "we don't know where she is."

=== May–June 2026: Delaney Hall protests ===
The U.S. Press Freedom Tracker reported dozens of assaults by law enforcement against journalists covering the Delaney Hall protests between May 22 and May 31. In five incidents, journalists' equipment was damaged by law enforcement.

Journalists covering the protests have also been reported being turned away by police for carrying bags used to carry personal protective equipment (PPE) such as goggles, helmets, and gas masks used to protect from weapons such as tear gas, pepper spray, and rubber bullets. One journalist at the protests said said, "I think it’s incredibly dangerous to expect that journalists would put themselves in these situations without being able to protect themselves."

- New Jersey State Police (NJSP) kettle protesters and journalists
- NJSP arrest a protester sitting down inside the kettle
- Protesters sing "We Shall Not Be Moved" during the kettle, May 31, 2026

On the morning of Sunday May 31, Newark mayor Ras Baraka announced an overnight curfew imposed by the Newark Police Division (NPD) in half-mile radius surrounding Delaney Hall between the hours of 9:00pm and 6:00am. Sherrill supported the curfew, saying "violent, chaotic clashes hurt everyone. They put the lives of both protesters and law enforcement in danger. They take the focus away from the people inside Delaney Hall and their families. And they raise the temperature with ICE." At around the same time, the Department of Homeland Security (DHS) posted on X saying the area around the facility had been secured and that they "WON'T BACK DOWN."

An hour before the curfew, military-grade armored vehicles arrived on the scene. At 8:30pm, the New Jersey State Police (NJSP) issued a verbal warning about the curfew in English and Spanish, prompting many to disperse. Shortly after, a line of NJSP riot police with riot shields blocked every exit on the street. At around 10pm, hundreds of riot police began running and surrounded over 61 peaceful protesters and members of the press in a kettle. Some members of the media reported being run out of the area.

Inside the kettle, a senior officer emerged from behind the shields and said "Listen up. If you are press, you got the opportunity right now — and that's it — to leave. If you don't leave out here in an orderly fashion, you are coming with us." He then pointed at someone in the group and snapped "You are not press."

After the announcement, protesters began chanting "Press don't leave!" After members of the press were escorted from the kettle, they were chased away by police until they were about 100 feet (30 meters) from the kettle. The NPD then ordered press to go even further down the road from where they were recording the kettle, prompting objections and a confrontation. Over an officer's radio, a voice said "If they refuse to move, push them back yourselves."

Everyone who remained in the kettle was arrested, making for 61 total arrests. During the arrests, riot police tightened the kettle, "cramming journalists and protesters closer together." Multiple members of the press were denied exit, including a conservative commentator who ended up with a black eye. At least three journalists in the kettle were arrested and spent a full day in custody while lawyers were denied access to see them. One of the arrested journalists, wearing a blue vest with the word "press" and an ID from his company dangled around his neck, was a member of the National Press Photographers Association. He was arrested by officers after being told his credentials were not verified. The Guardian later asked the governor's office and mayor's office what "verified" credentials meant and did not receive a response. Another of the arrested journalists was injured and taken to a hospital, where he said two arrested protesters were also being treated for injuries from the arrests. One journalist claimed they were charged with felony rioting and resisting arrest. The Freedom of the Press Foundation member said after the incident, "at least three of those arrested ended up in the hospital. Do I really need to explain why press cameras needed to be rolling?"

The New Jersey Office of the Public Defender (OPD) said all of the complaints they examined included fourth-degree rioting and resisting arrest felony charges, which carry a maximum sentence of 18 months in prison. The people arrested were taken to the Essex County Correctional Facility and held for over 24 hours because the NPD was slow to process them. The OPD said this was "unnecessary and really not something that happens very often," and the office said charging with felonies was a "big reach" based on the "kind of conduct we were seeing from protesters on the ground." A lawyer in the OPD said all the complaints he examined by police used "boilerplate language listing the offenses said to be committed by the crowd collectively, without offering detail on what any individual is accused of doing." He said "The police have not made out the barest minimum of probable cause," and the office said these cases were typically charged via summons rather than an arrest warrant.

Eighteen press freedom organizations co-signed a public condemnation of the arrests, including the American Society of Journalists and Authors (ASJA); Coalition For Women In Journalism (CFWIJ); Committee to Protect Journalists (CPJ); The Deadline Club; The Free Press (CBS News); Freedom of the Press Foundation (FPF); International Women's Media Foundation (IWMF); Investigative Reporters and Editors (IRE); National Press Photographers Association (NPPA); National Press Club (NPC), including the National Press Club Journalism Institute; New York Press Club (NYPC); New Jersey Society of Professional Journalists; PEN America; Radio Television Digital News Association (RTDNA); Reporters Without Borders (RSF); Society of Environmental Journalists (SEJ); and Society of Professional Journalists (SPJ). The letter alleged First Amendment violations by law enforcement and demanded the dropping of charges against journalists arrested. The committee to Protect Journalists said "This type of behavior has no place in a democracy." The Free Press said arrests of journalists were intended to "chill coverage" of abuses during the arrests. Reporters Without Borders said "these attacks are unconstitutional repression typical of an authoritarian regime."

Shortly after the arrests, New Jersey Attorney General Jennifer Davenport issued a statement thanking police for "de-escalating" the situation and saying those arrested were "armed" with helmets, shields, and gas masks. DHS retweeted a post on X bragging about kettling the protesters. Baraka lifted the curfew the next day.

The OPD, representing roughly 40 out of the 61 people arrested, said over half of arrestees were approached by Federal Bureau of Investigation (FBI) agents for questioning after the FBI obtained arrestee telephone records and address information from criminal complaints from the arrests. The OPD claimed friends and family of arrestees were approached, and the FBI also arrived outside their apartments for knock and talks. The OPD argued this violated their right to legal representation.

Governor Sherrill defended the police response at the protests. When a caller during a phone-in likened the state police response to Operation Metro Surge federal crackdowns in Minneapolis, Sherrill denied the comparison, saying "Nobody [was] certainly killed in this instance" (referring to the killings of Renée Good and Alex Pretti). The next day, protesters carried signs critical of Governor Sherrill, accusing her of making things worse and "lying about Delaney Hall." Protesters also chanted "Hey, Mikie, WTF?"

Baraka released a public statement condemning the actions of police over the weekend, saying the NJSP "kind of resembled what ICE was doing in the first place" and characterizing their behavior as "overly aggressive, unnecessary and in some cases, unconstitutional."

== See also ==
Broad articles

- Censorship in the United States
- Freedom of speech in the United States
- Freedom of the press in the United States
- List of journalists killed in the United States
- U.S. Press Freedom Tracker

Timeline of related events

- 1837: Elijah Parish Lovejoy – U.S. authorities failed to prevent murder of journalist in a riot
- 1941: Office of Censorship – U.S. agency during WW2 that censored the press
- 1961: Freedom Riders – U.S. authorities deliberately stood down to allow the KKK to beat reporters
- 1962: Ole Miss riot of 1962 – Reporters were attacked by white supremacist mobs
- 1966: Chicago Freedom Movement – U.S. authorities failed to prevent white neighborhood mobs from assaulting press
- 1971: Pentagon Papers – Richard Nixon attempted to stop the release of the Pentagon Papers but was blocked by the Supreme Court
- 2003: April 2003 journalist killings by the United States – U.S. military shot and killed three journalists in Iraq
- 2006–present: Timeline of Wikipedia–U.S. government conflicts – U.S. government lawsuits, surveillance, and investigations against Wikipedia and Wikipedians
- 2007: July 12, 2007, Baghdad airstrike – U.S. Apache helicopters killed two Reuters journalists in Iraq
- 2013: 2013 articles about the Department of Justice investigations of reporters – U.S. authorities charged Associated Press reporters under the Espionage Act of 1917
- 2016–present: Donald Trump's conflict with the media
- 2025: Inside CECOT – CECOT news segment on 60 Minutes abruptly pulled from the air in the United States
