= Prisoner 345 =

2006 documentary

Prisoner 345 is a 2006 documentary film.

== Synopsis ==
Prisoner 345 is about detained Al Jazeera cameraman Sami Al Hajj, who was detained at the United States detainee camp at Guantanamo Bay detention camp in 2002. The film retells the arrest of Al Hajj at the Afghan-Pakistani border. The film has been shown at international film festivals in Australia, Canada, Lebanon, New Zealand and the United States.

== Release ==
The film runs 50 minutes and is a production of the Al Jazeera television network. The film is produced by Ahmad Ibrahim & Abdallah El Binni and directed by Abdallah El Binni.

The film has been distributed to Amnesty International, Human Rights Watch, Reporters Without Borders, and Reprieve.
