= Sami al-Hajj =

Sudanese journalist and former Guantanamo Bay detainee

Sami Mohy El Din Muhammed Al Hajj
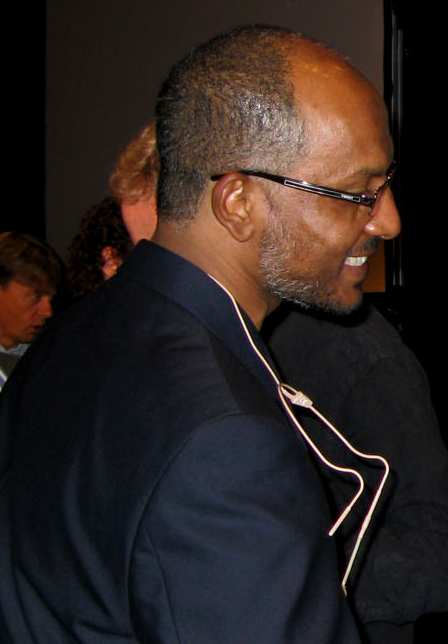
- Al Hajj in Doha after his release, 2008
- Born: February 15, 1969 (age 57); Khartoum, Sudan
- Arrested: 15 December 2001; Chaman border crossing, Pakistan; Pakistan
- Released: 1 May 2008; Flown to Khartoum, Sudan via U.S. military plane.
- Detained at: Guantanamo
- ISN: 345
- Status: Released

Sami Mohy El Din Muhammed Al Hajj (Arabic: سامي محي الدين محمد الحاج), aka Sami Al-Haj (born February 15, 1969) is a Sudanese journalist for the Al Jazeera network. In 2001, while on his way to do camera work for the network in Afghanistan, he was arrested by the Pakistani army and held in the United States Guantanamo Bay detainment camp in Cuba for over six years. After his release, al-Hajj wrote a book titled Prisoner 345. He was released without charge on May 1, 2008. He later attempted to launch legal action against George W. Bush.

Al Hajj's case was portrayed in a documentary titled Prisoner 345 by Al Jazeera producer Ahmad Ibrahim.

== Background ==
Al Hajj was arrested in Pakistan on December 15, 2001. He was on his way to work in Afghanistan as a cameraman for Al Jazeera and had a legitimate visa. He was held as an "enemy combatant" at the Guantanamo Bay detainment camp, with Guantanamo Internment Serial Number 345, and was the only journalist to be held in Guantanamo.

British human rights lawyer Clive Stafford Smith represented al-Hajj, and was able to visit him in 2005. According to Stafford Smith, Al Hajj had "endured horrendous abuse - sexual abuse and religious persecution" and that he had been beaten, leaving a "huge scar" on his face. Stafford Smith also said that Al Hajj had witnessed "the Quran being flushed down the toilet by US soldiers in Afghanistan" and "expletives being written on the Muslim holy book".

On 23 November 2005, Stafford Smith said that, during (125 of 130) interviews, U.S. officials had questioned Al Hajj as to whether Al Jazeera was a front for al-Qaeda.

Stafford Smith stated of his client that:

He is completely innocent. He is about as much of a terrorist as my granddad. The only reason he has been treated like he has is because he is an Al Jazeera journalist. The Americans have tried to make him an informant with the goal of getting him to say that Al Jazeera is linked to Al Qaida.

Al Jazeera responded that Al Hajj reported his passport stolen in Sudan in 1999, and that anything done with the passport after that date was likely the work of identity thieves.

During Al Hajj's time in captivity, Reporters Without Borders repeatedly expressed concern over his detention, mentioning Al Hajj in its annual Worldwide Press Freedom Index, and launched a petition for his release.

In January 2007, Al Hajj and several other inmates went on hunger strike in protest of their treatment in Guantanamo, during which Al Hajj lost over 55 pounds. In response to the hunger strike, Al Hajj and the other inmates were force-fed. Al Hajj's hunger strike lasted 438 days until he was set free on 1 May 2008.

When Alan Johnston, former Gaza Correspondent for the BBC, was abducted on 12 March 2007 in Gaza City by gunmen from the Army of Islam and held for 113 days, Sami Al Hajj made a plea to Johnston's captors to let the journalist go. Following his release, Johnston made a similar plea for the release of Al Hajj, being held by the United States Government in Guantanamo.

== Interrogation ==
On 20 April 2007, the UK newspaper, The Guardian, started publishing excerpts from Clive Stafford Smith's book, Bad Men: Guantanamo Bay and the Secret Prisons. According to Stafford Smith:

Against the background of this campaign against al-Jazeera, what I learned about Sami's ongoing interrogation in Guantanamo was disturbing. In the first 100-plus sessions, the US military never posed a question about the allegations against him, as they were only interested in turning him into an informant against al-Jazeera. He had to ask them to interrogate him about what he was supposed to have done wrong.

== Health and hunger strike ==
In 1998, Al Hajj was treated for throat cancer and prescribed a course of anti-cancer drugs that he was to take every day for the rest of his life. In letters from the detention camp, he claimed that he was being denied these medications by the authorities.

The authorities were also reported to have "refused to provide him with a support for his knee as this contains metal and is classified as a security threat."

On 7 January 2007, Al Hajj went on a hunger strike. Al Jazeera's website published his demands which included:

- The right for detainees to practice their religion freely and without duress.
- Applying the Geneva Convention to the treatment of Guantanamo detainees.
- Releasing a number of prisoners from isolation confinement, and in particular one Shakir Amer that has been in continued isolation since September 2005.
- Conducting a full and fair investigation into the deaths of three prisoners who died in June 2006.
- His release or trial by a federal US court.

Zachary Katznelson, senior counsel of Reprieve, a London-based human rights group representing Al Hajj, visited the cameraman at Guantanamo Bay on February 1. U.S. military officials declined to confirm whether Al Hajj was among the 12 detainees on hunger strike at the time.

On 22 August 2007, Clive Stafford Smith told Reporters Without Borders that he had found Al Hajj's health had seriously deteriorated since his last visit. He said that Al Hajj looked more frail, and visibly had trouble concentrating.

On 10 September 2007, Clive Stafford said that Al Hajj was focused on the worry that he would be the next captive to die and losing his ability to speak English.

On 11 September 2007, Al Jazeera reported that Al Hajj was suffering from depression and losing the will to live.

By 19 October 2007, Al Hajj had lost over 55 pounds since beginning his hunger strike in January.

== Guantanamo detainee file ==
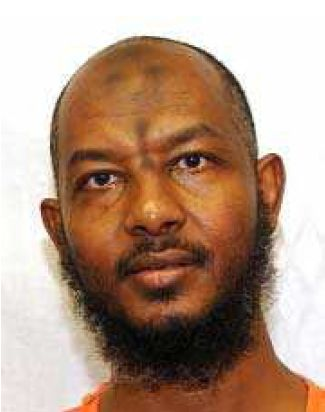
Al Hajj's Guantanamo mugshot

On 26 April 2011, a classified file on Al Hajj's Guantanamo detention was leaked. The file, dated 4 April 2008, describes Al Hajj as a high risk detainee that allegedly had a leadership position in the Muslim Brotherhood’s Shura Council and was involved in plans and operations to distribute weapons, to include Stinger missiles, and financial support to extremists in Chechnya.

The file on Al Hajj also alleged that Al Hajj provided logistical support to Islamic militants in Chechnya through and organization called al-Haramayn, an Islamic charity formally based in Saudi Arabia that has since been shut down for its involvement in money laundering for Al Qaeda. The file on Al Hajj alleged that Al Hajj was working with al-Haramayn in Baku, Azerbaijan, as a money courier and propagandist for the terror network under the cover of his employment with the Union Beverage Company (UBC) and his cameraman position at Al-Jazeera Media.

According to the file, Al Hajj "admitted shipping supplies and carrying funds to Chechnya" but had "not been forthcoming regarding his activities in support of terrorist organizations as reported by other sources." The file said that he had been "careful not to implicate himself as a member of an extremist organization, or to have had any dealings with extremists beyond performing interviews as a journalist."

Among the reasons for Al Hajj's transfer to the facility, the file listed:

To provide information on ... the al-Jazeera News Network's training program, telecommunications equipment, and newsgathering operations in Chechnya, Kosovo, and Afghanistan, including the network's acquisition of a video of UBL [Usama Bin Laden] and a subsequent interview with UBL.

== Reviews by U.S. authorities ==
=== Combatant Status Review Tribunal ===
Stafford Smith summarized the allegations from Al Hajj's Combatant Status Review Tribunal:

...that he had allegedly run a website that supported terrorism, that he had trafficked in arms, that he entered Afghanistan illegally in October 2001 while US air strikes were under way, and that he interviewed Osama bin Laden.

According to Al Jazeera, the U.S. authorities labelled Al Hajj an "enemy combatant" and announced a number of charges against him, including:

- That he travelled to the middle East, the Balkans, and the Caucasus for clandestine purposes.
- That he had an internet site that supports terrorists.
- That he was involved in selling Stinger missiles to Chechen rebels.
- That he was caught entering Afghanistan illegally.
- That he interviewed Osama bin Laden (a charge that was later dropped).

Ahmad Ibrahim, a colleague of Al Hajj who documented his case in the documentary Prisoner 345, denied each these charges.

=== Subsequent Administrative Review Boards ===
On 23 February 2007, it was reported that Al Hajj's continued detention had been reviewed by a subsequent Administrative Review Board. Al Hajj was not one of the eighty captives who that round of Administrative Review Boards had recommended for release or transfer.

His colleagues at Al Jazeera said "his detention is American harassment of an Arabic TV network whose coverage has long angered U.S. officials." Lamis Andoni, a Middle East analyst for Al Jazeera, said in reference to the November 2001 and April 2003 bombings of Al Jazeera's offices: "When you are targeted once, it could be a mistake, but when you are bombed twice, it's something else."

The director of the Joint Intelligence Group, Paul Rester, said: "I consider the information that we obtained from him to be useful", though he declined to offer any substantiation for this claim.

During his first Administrative Review Board hearing, Al Hajj said he was going to decline to reply to the charges, on legal advice. However, Al Hajj's lawyer, Clive Stafford Smith, said that:

- Al Hajj was not a clandestine financial courier, but: "...he and his wife once carried $220,000 from Qatar to Azerbaijan for his boss at the beverage company - and ... he even declared the cash to customs."
- Al Hajj did meet Mamdouh Mahmud Salim once "while working for the beverage company ... when he was sent to pick him up at the airport in Qatar in 1998. During the drive, the two discussed schools and housing."

== Release negotiation and release ==
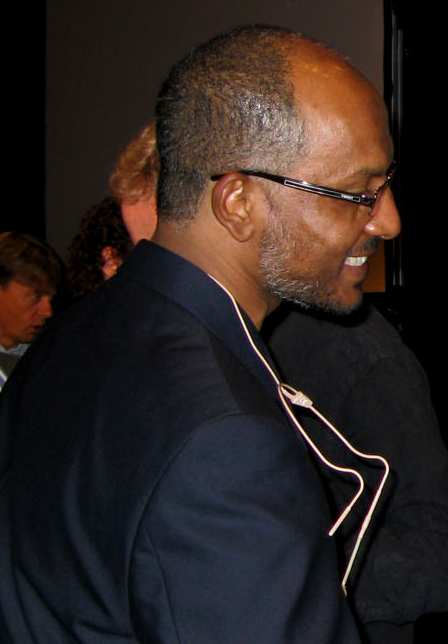
al-Hajj at the 2008 Global Investigative Journalism Conference .

On 15 August 2007, a spokesperson for the U.S. Department of State stated of Al Hajj's case:

Asim al-Haj (aka Sami el Hadj) is being detained at Guantanamo Bay as an enemy combatant in the armed conflict with al Qaida, the Taliban, and their affiliates and supporters. Consistent with the law of armed conflict, the United States is entitled to hold enemy combatants until the end of hostilities, to prevent them from returning to the battlefield.

Mr. el Hadj has been found to be an enemy combatant by a Combatant Status Review Tribunal. Under the Detainee Treatment Act, Mr. el Hadj, like all detainees at Guantanamo, has the right to challenge that determination in U.S. federal court.

The United States does not want to detain anyone any longer than is necessary. Mr. el Hadj's detention is reviewed at least annually by an Administrative Review Board to evaluate the need for his continued detention, including an assessment of the threat he poses to the United States and its allies. Through that process, the Deputy Secretary of Defense has so far determined that he should remain detained at Guantanamo Bay.

We defer to Department of Defense on any additional questions about the scheduling of detainees' Administrative Review Boards and other details about this process.

We will not put detainees or our operations at risk by discussing the possibility of transfers or releases before they take place.

On the same day, Ali Sadiq, an official of the Sudanese Foreign Ministry, stated:

Last month, we received a memorandum from the US administration to the effect that they are considering Al Hajj's case and will hand down a final decision this month ... Based on this memo, we confirmed to the US administration in writing that Sami al-Hajj is an average Sudanese citizen with no extreme religious affiliations, he practices the religion like all other Sudanese citizens, and that in case he is released he will under no circumstances pose any threat to US security.

Sami Al Hajj was released on 1 May 2008 from Guantanamo Bay and flown to Sudan. He arrived in the Sudanese capital Khartoum on a US military plane in the early hours of Friday, May 2. Al Jazeera showed footage of him being carried into the hospital on a stretcher, looking frail but smiling and surrounded by well-wishers.

== After Guantánamo Bay ==
Upon release, al-Hajj announced his intention to sue George W Bush and other leaders involved in his detention at Guantanamo Bay. He co-founded the Guantánamo Justice Centre as part of these efforts. In a later interview, he claimed that the organisation received no external support.

He returned to work for Al Jazeera after his release, leading a new section covering civil liberties and human rights.

== Open letter to President Biden ==
On January 29, 2021, the New York Review of Books published an open letter from al-Hajj, and six other individuals who were formerly held in Guantanamo, to newly inaugurated President Biden, appealing to him to close the detention camp.

== See also ==
- Hunger strike
- Guantanamo force feeding
