= Sitting Bull Family Foundation =

Founder of SBFF is Ernie Lapointe

The Sitting Bull Family Foundation (SBFF) was founded by Ernie LaPointe. According to the organization's website, its mission is to offer the accurate oral history of Sitting Bull through storytelling, by sharing his exemplary cultural and spiritual way of life, and to awaken cultural awareness in the traditional Lakota way of life.

According to SBFF, the organization provides educational projects for the people of Native American descent and those wanting to learn how to live in peace and harmony with Mother Earth.

According to its website, SBFF focuses on education aimed at teaching young people the Lakota language and culture, while also including environmental and genealogical instruction for the wider community.

Sitting Bull Family Foundation is incorporated as a nonprofit corporation under the laws of South Dakota and recognized as a public charity by the Internal Revenue Service (IRS), tax exempt under section 501(c)(3).
