= Sitting Bull's Voice =

Sitting Bull's Voice is a 2013 documentary film by Bill Matson, narrated by John Thorpe, and story by Ernie Lapointe. The film documents the life of Ernie LaPointe, the great-grandson of Hunkpapa Lakota chief, Sitting Bull (Tatanka Iyotake).

The film examines LaPointe's life from childhood through his struggles overcoming alcohol and marijuana addiction related to PTSD while homeless. As part of his recovery, LaPointe describes his embrace of his Native American culture and the spiritual ways of his ancestors, along with his quest to become the authoritative voice for Sitting Bull.

== Accolades ==
The film has been shown at 10 film festivals, winning four awards and two Best Film awards. In January 2013 the San Pedro International Film Festival in San Pedro, California honored it with the Best Documentary Award; in 2014 the film received the Best Native American Feature Award from the Indie Spirit Film festival in Colorado Springs, Colorado; and at the last festival in January, 2015 the film received the 2015 Best Picture-Documentary-Feature Honorable Mention Award (Second Place) at the Flathead Lake International Film Festival in Polson, Montana.
