= Crow Foot =

Son of Sitting Bull

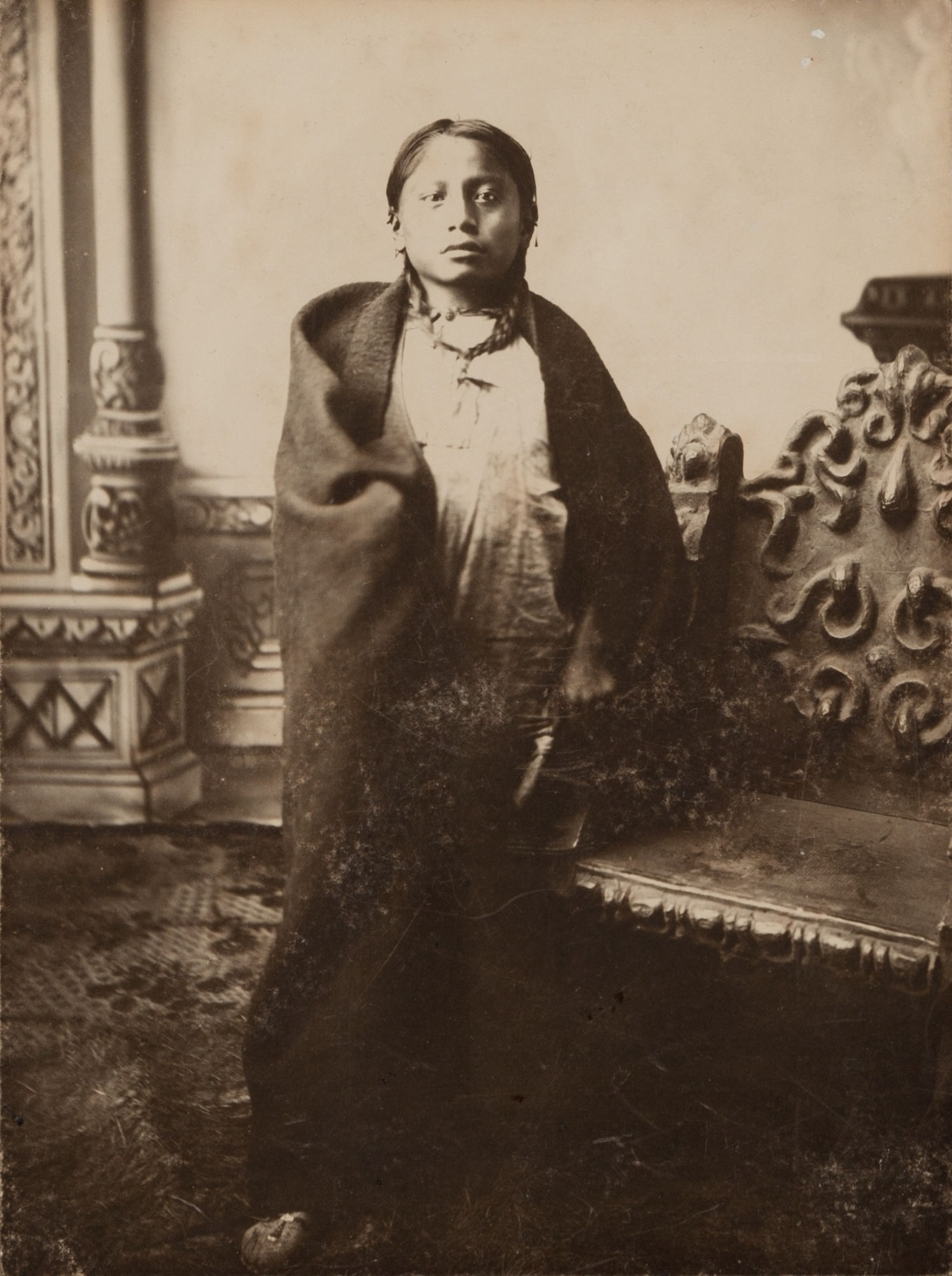
Crow Foot

Crow Foot (c. 1876 – December 15, 1890) was the son of Sitting Bull of the Lakota.

His mother was either Seen by Her Nation or Four Robes. He had sisters named Standing Holy and "Lizzie" Her-Lodge-in-Sight; he also had brothers named Henry, Little Soldier, Red Scout, and William Sitting Bull. He was a twin and was born just before the Battle of the Little Bighorn in 1876. He was named in honor of Crowfoot, the Blackfeet chief in Canada.

Crow Foot was recalled in his father's obituary as "'bright as a dollar with eyes that fairly snap like whips'".

His father, who believed Indian children needed to learn to read and write, placed Crow Foot and his other children in a Congregational day school. Crow Foot was reportedly Sitting Bull's favorite son.

Crow Foot was said to be "a solemn youth of seventeen" who "displayed a wisdom remarkable for one so young". According to Robert Higheagle, "Crow Foot was not like the rest of the boys. He did not get out and mingle with the boys and play their games. He grew old too early'".

In 1881 he participated alongside his father in the surrender at Fort Buford, handing his father's Winchester rifle to Major Brotherton.

Crow Foot was killed along with his father on December 15, 1890, by a group of Indian agents. One of the police later reported that Crow Foot told his father, "You always called yourself a brave chief. Now you are allowing yourself to be taken by the Ceska maza" (police). The first military and police chronicles of the arrest do not mention Crow Foot saying this.

Lone Man found him hiding in a pile of blankets. Crow Foot said, "'My uncles, do not kill me. I do not wish to die'". Some sources say that the policemen killed him at the instruction of dying Bull Head, who said, "Do what you like with him. He is one of them that has caused this trouble". Other sources state that Bull Head said he didn't care what they did.

Lone Man "smashed Crow Foot across the forehead with a rifle butt, which sent him reeling across the room and out the door. There Lone Man and two others, tears streaming down their cheeks, pumped bullets into him."
