= Iksas =

Choctaw clan system

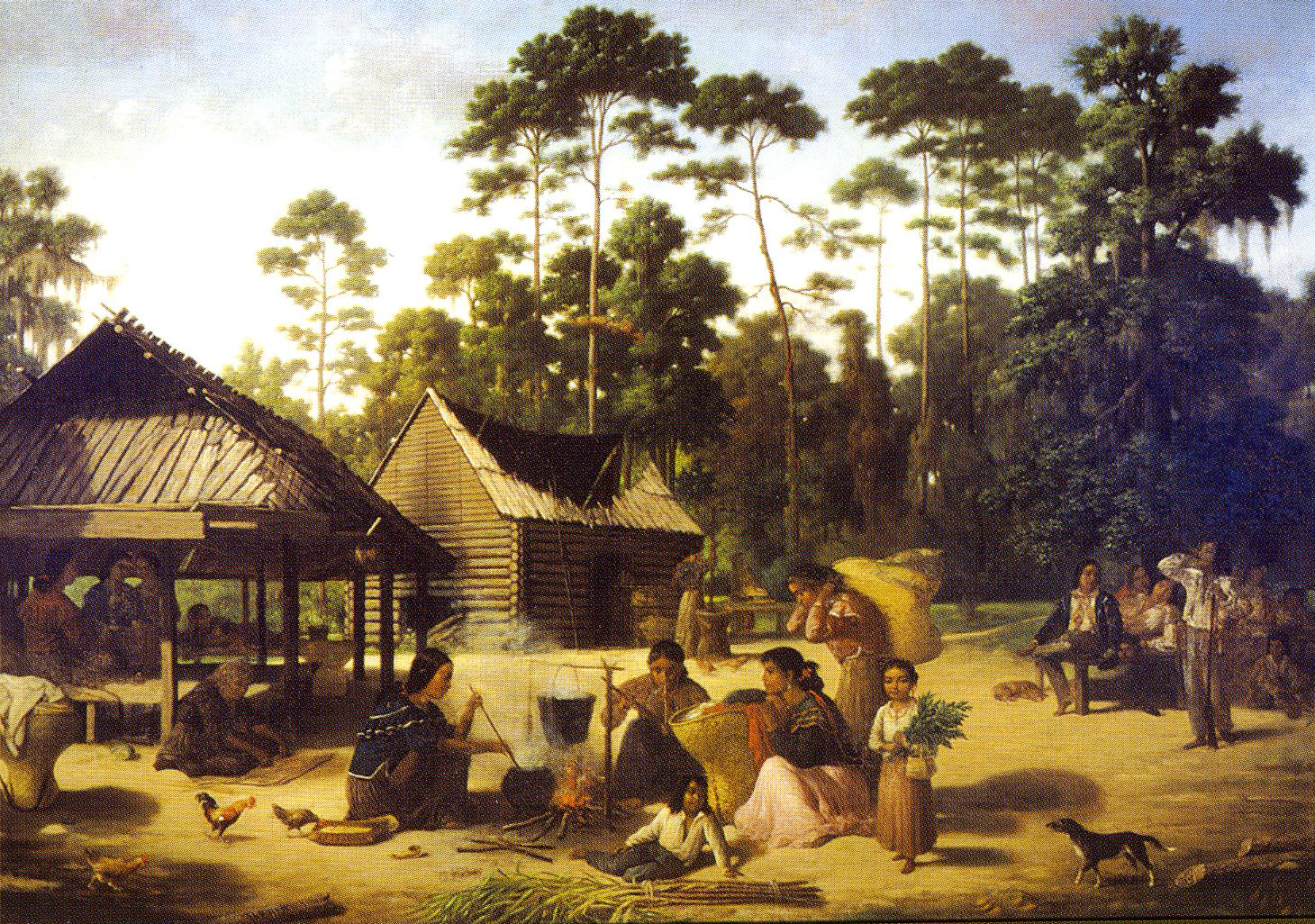
Choctaw Village near the Chefuncte François Bernard – 1869

The Iksa, a type of clan, was the traditional constituent element structuring the social and political society of the Choctaw nation. The same word is used to describe clans in the Chickasaw language, however, while often self-identified as "sister" or "brother" tribes, the manifestation of Iksas in the Choctaw nation does not necessarily immediately mirror those of the Chickasaw. Traditionally, the Choctaw clans were matrilineal and matrilocal, which exhibited important implications on gender roles. Historically, the clans were divided into either one of two groups: the Imoklasha and Iholahata. Therewithin, the clans were primarily composed of those who were considered to descend from a specific ancestor or ancestral group. The Choctaw stated to the American Board of Commissioners for Foreign Missions that the "nation would not exist" without the presence of iksa. Aside from its importance within families, the clans also shaped and directed ceremonies and legal practices.

== Kinship ==
The central tenet of clan organization was kinship ties. Traditionally, lineage and one's kin networks were traced matrilineally and assigned from birth. On an individual level, it provided Choctaws with an identity and well-defined societal position. Within the clan, kin networks were a set of "ready-made relationships". Members considered each other as family, regardless of how distant in relation. For example, a child's second or third maternal cousin was referred to as 'brother' or 'sister'.

Clans led by matriarchs dictated claims to membership, land distribution and marriages, amongst many others. Namely, ceremonies that honoured the death of a member in one moiety were completed by the other. The moieties were also involved in public hearings in the event of a crime. Kin ties of the criminal would "appear as counsel", with the other clan as the accusers.

=== Fictive kin ===
Kin relations also applied to those who were not native Choctaw by birth. Beyond the communal space, fictional kinship relationships were the way Choctaws related to strangers, outsiders, or enemies. Outsiders, considered kin and not foe, were recruited into the expansive network. Enlisting individuals as Choctaw kin retained cultural understandings of balance and harmonious co-existence with others. In short, welcoming strangers into the Choctaw community included assigning the individual a kin identity.

Allotting people with kin identities also occurred to replenish the population. Also known as "re-quickening", the Choctaws replaced deceased or missing community members through adoption rituals. Records indicate that the newly incorporated adoptees would receive the departed person's name. Likewise, they were considered Choctaw and expected to perform the responsibilities of the individual they had re-quickened.

== Names of Iksas ==
The names of the known iksas described by American ethnographer John Reed Swanton in 1931 are as follows:

- Bok Chito or Bogue Chitto, meaning "Big Stream"
- Biasha meaning "Mulberry Place"
- Okla Untuklo meaning "Seven Towns"
- Yakan-Okani meaning "Land Creek"
- Haiyip Atokola meaning "Second Lake" or "Two Lakes"
- Chickashahe possibly meaning "Chickasaw Potato"
- Kushak meaning "Reedbrake People" or the name of a bird found in the reedbrakes
- Spani Okla meaning "Spanish People"
- Obala Chaha meaning may relate to the location of Turkey Creek
- Koe chito meaning "Panther"
- Bok Falaia meaning "Long Creek"
- Yanabe meaning unknown
- Yashu meaning unknown
- Abeka meaning unknown
- Lukfata meaning unknown
- Haiyowani
- Shåktci Homma meaning "Red Crawfish"

== Gender in the iksa ==
=== Family iksa ===
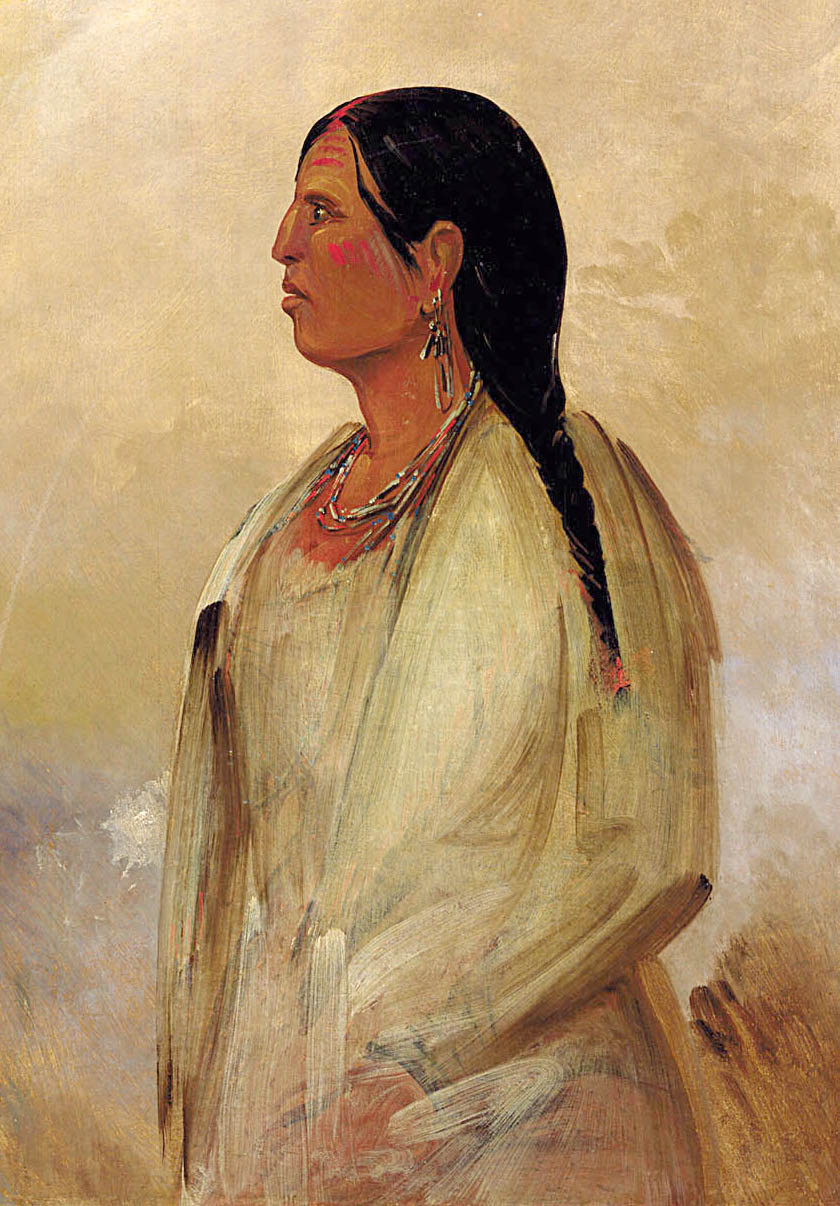
Choctaw Woman George Caitlin – 1834

Matrilineal organisation and kinship ties also dictated the family iksa or domestic sphere of relations. Upon marriage, husbands joined their wives' households but were precluded as members of her clan or kinship network. Instead, he was considered a guest and not a direct relative. In the event of separation, divorcee husbands would return to the iksa with which they carried a matrilineal connection, such as their sisters.

==== Childcare ====
On the contrary, children born from the union were instantaneously part of their biological mother's clan. These connections held crucial implications for the way family iksas ran a household. Choctaw women directed domestic life through food preparation and childcare, and their autonomy in agricultural labour intertwined with the upkeep of the home. In contrast to conventional responsibilities in Western fatherhood, the Choctaw child's eldest maternal uncle would be one of the primary decision-makers. The typical Choctaw father would be more heavily involved in nurturing his nieces and nephews than his biological children. As part of the complementary gendered dimension in the household, matrilines would work collaboratively with their siblings regarding childcare.

=== Division of labour ===
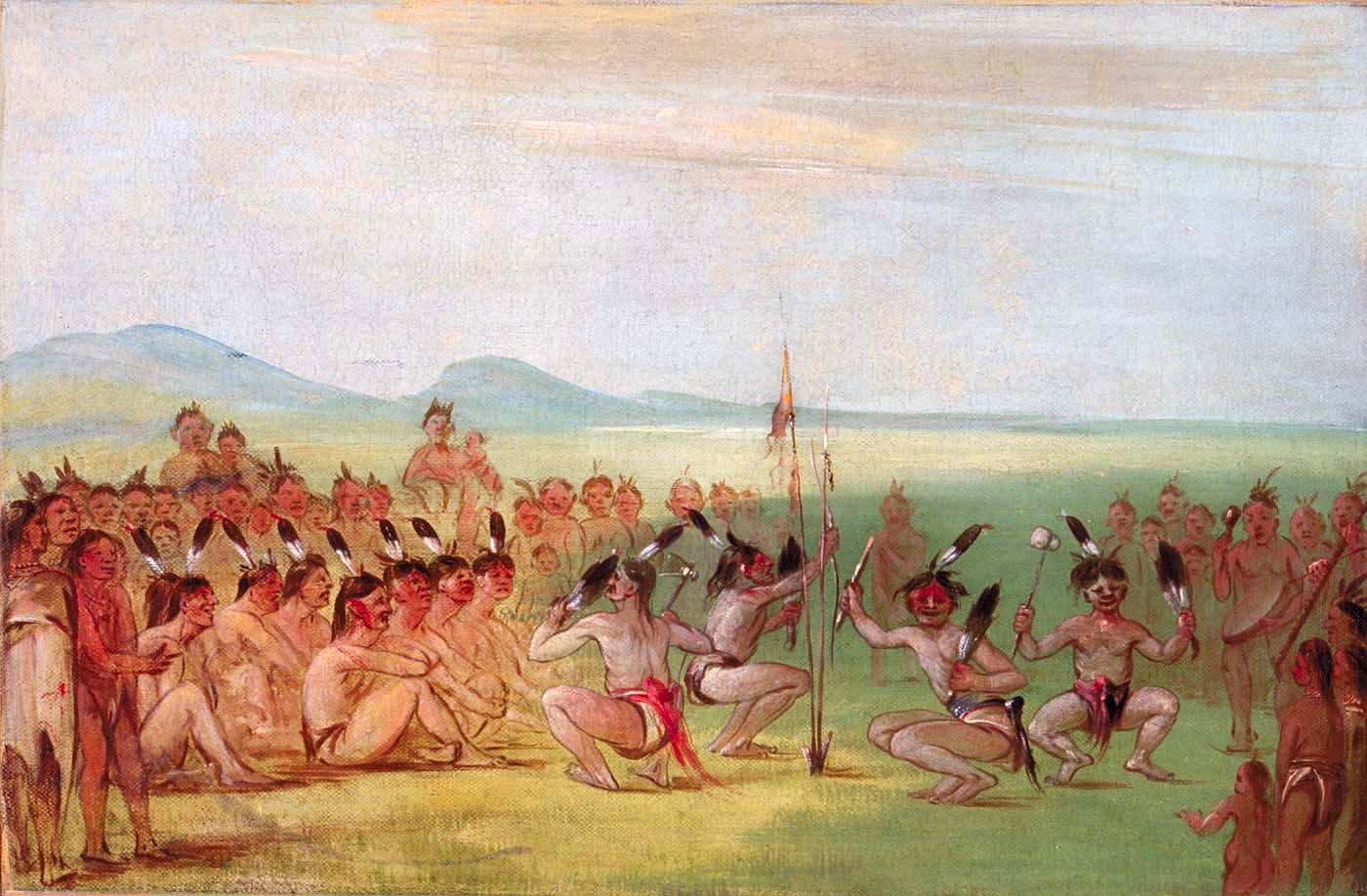
Painting of Eagle Dance, Choctaw – 1861/1869 by George Caitlin The eagle dance was one of many Choctaw ceremonies; it occurred annually to honour the war eagle.

Choctaw clans and kinship promoted a society where the division of labour between men and women was equal and complementary. While men took on the roles of hunters and warriors, women controlled the agricultural features of the Choctaw. Women maintained harvests and crops and sometimes "ridicule[d]" men who attempted too much agrarian labour. The females communally owned property and supervised yields, such as corn, pumpkins and beans. Two-thirds of Choctaw sustenance were derived from these crops, which provided women with an integral status.

Lucy Case, a child of Choctaw parents who resided in Indian Territory, described:

"I remember that my mother did most of the work. She always did the breaking of the land."

Maize was mainly symbolic of the authority of women and was used in marriage rites, diplomatic exchanges, ceremonial life and medicine. The remaining third of the Choctaw caloric intake was the game hunted by men, which women were responsible for transporting and cooking. Occasionally, Choctaw women accompanied the men on hunting excursions, where faunal remains were constructed into tools or weapons.

== Evolution of the clan system in the nineteenth century ==
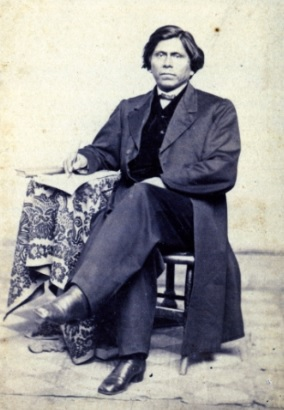
A portrait of Allen Wright, a Choctaw delegate who signed the Treaty of 1866. The treaty abolished slave-owning practices within the Chickasaws and Choctaws, and provided access to forty acres of land.

The increasing pressures of the modern American settler state circumvented traditional means of organisation in the Choctaw nation. The 1900s to 1930s marked a drastic transformation in government systems. To "make itself legible" to the federal and state governments, kinship systems were replaced with formal laws that regulated the behaviour and relationships of Choctaws. Therefore, its contraction undermined clan organisation, the centrality of women, and the matrilineal system. When Choctaw law was formalised in 1826, they adapted traditional practices to a more American style of governance. As a result, a constitution, written legislation and four bureaucratic branches of "legislative, executive, judiciary, and military" were created. The constitution disenfranchised women and left little space for female authority in the political process. Furthermore, Indian Agents solely recognised men as the representative of an iksa, further entrenching patriarchic hierarchies in politics.

The traditional family iksa also transformed due to the paradigms of gender that Americans coercively imposed. Patrilineal kinship was recognised on an "equal basis" to the formerly matrilineal system, which took precedence in diplomatic communications and inheritance patterns. Additionally, anglicised surnames were incorporated and passed through the men, with wives acquiring their husbands' last names. Men became more directly involved with their biological children, especially when maternal lineage was no longer the prerequisite for membership claims.

Simultaneously to the inclusion of Euro-American ideologies, Choctaws adapted to retain autonomy over traditional practices and retain the population. Despite the centralisation of government, these changes did not wholly obliterate a Choctaw woman's status. Although women lost relative control over reproductive rights, crimes such as infanticide were punished to defend against population decline. Moreover, by October 1836, the Choctaws imposed safeguards to protect female victims of rape and other sexual crimes.

== See also ==
- Choctaw
- Culture of the Choctaw
- History of the Choctaw
- Choctaw language
- Choctaw Nation of Oklahoma
- Choctaw in the American Civil War
- List of Choctaw treaties
