= Ernie LaPointe =

American writer

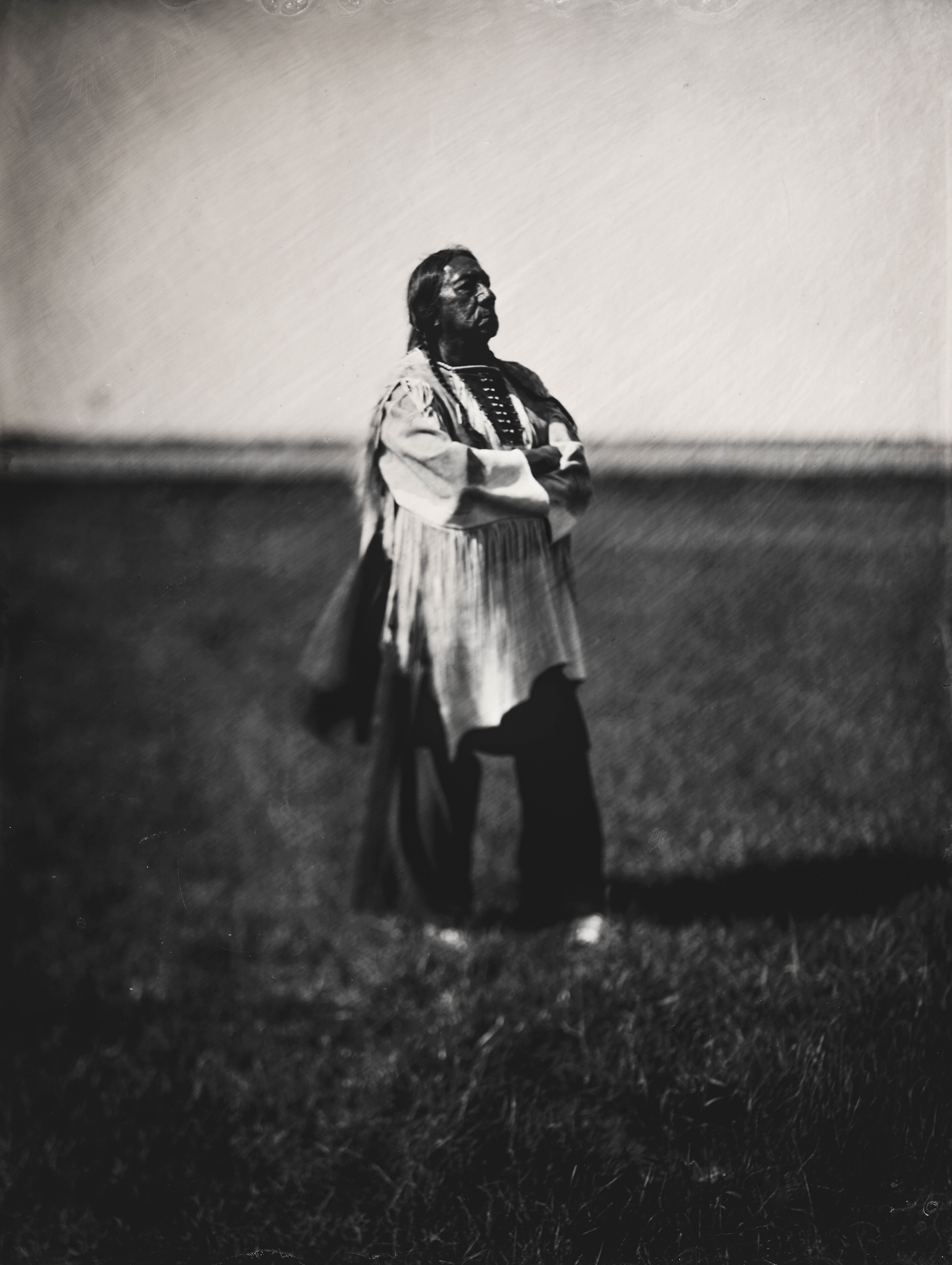
- Eternal Field, A wet-plate collodion photograph of Ernie LaPointe
- Born: 1948 (age 77–78); Pine Ridge, South Dakota, U.S.
- Occupations: Writer, Orator
- Spouse: Sonja LaPointe
- Relatives: Sitting Bull (great-grandfather)

Ernie LaPointe (born 1948) is an Indigenous American Sun Dancer, author, and orator, known for being the great-grandson of Sitting Bull (Tȟatȟáŋka Íyotake), chief of the Hunkpapa Lakota. LaPointe had a long journey from childhood through struggles overcoming alcohol and marijuana use related to PTSD while homeless, the embracement of his culture and the spiritual ways of his ancestors, to his quest to become the authoritative voice for his great-grandfather, as is shown in the documentary Sitting Bull's Voice.

== Early life and education ==
LaPointe was born on the Pine Ridge Indian Reservation in South Dakota. He is the son of Claude LaPointe and Angeline Spotted Horse LaPointe. LaPointe grew up in Rapid City, SD, where he attended public school. His mother was a housewife (and appeared on "I've Got A Secret", October 1958) and his father worked in a lumber yard in Rapid City. At the age of ten Ernie lost his mother to cancer and at seventeen his father died of a heart attack.

== Military service ==
At eighteen, LaPointe joined the Army and was stationed in Korea, Turkey, Germany, and various locations around the United States. He did one tour in Vietnam in 1970-1971 and received an honorable discharge in 1972.

== Writing ==
While growing up, LaPointe's mother told him not to tell others about his relationship to Sitting Bull. Before his mother's death Lapointe was told that a day might come when it will be important for him to set the record straight about his great-grandfather, Sitting Bull. In 1992, LaPointe talked publicly about Sitting Bull's direct blood descendants by speaking at the induction of Sitting Bull into the Hall of Fame of American Indian Chiefs at Anadarko, Oklahoma. LaPointe then began writing a book Sitting Bull: His Life and Legacy and speaking to audiences throughout the country and abroad about his great-grandfather.

== Film ==
In 2012 LaPointe began work on a documentary film project, Sitting Bull's Voice with director Bill Matson. The film recounts the Sitting Bull family oral history and follows LaPointe's journey from childhood to becoming the voice for his great-grandfather. The film has been shown at 10 film festivals around the country, winning four awards and two Best Film awards. In January 2013 the San Pedro International Film Festival in San Pedro, California honored it with the Best Documentary Award; in 2014 the film received the Best Native American Feature Award from the Indie Spirit Film festival in Colorado Springs, Colorado; and at the last festival in January, 2015 the film received the 2015 Best Picture-Documentary-Feature Honorable Mention Award (Second Place) at the Flathead Lake International Film Festival.

== Public speaking ==
LaPointe and his wife spend much of their time traveling throughout the United States and abroad speaking at universities, museums, and film festivals about the history of Sitting Bull as well as the cultural heritage of the Lakota people. In 2010, LaPointe was invited to be a keynote speaker at the University of Notre Dame graduation ceremony.

== Repatriation and reinterment ==
A lock of hair and leggings attributed to Sitting Bull were in the collection of the National Museum of Natural History, Smithsonian Institution. On December 5, 2007, LaPointe went to the National Museum of Natural History for the repatriation of both items. A ceremony with regard to Sitting Bull's hair followed at LaPointe's South Dakota residence. A small portion of hair was also given to a DNA specialist in Europe to enable those who believe they might be related to Sitting Bull to have a DNA test done. LaPointe, along with his sisters Marlene Little Spotted Horse Andersen, Ethel Little Spotted Horse Bates, and Lydia Little Spotted Horse Red Paint, have been petitioning the government for the reinterment of their ancestor's remains from a grave in South Dakota to the site of Sitting Bull's greatest vision: the Battle of Little Big Horn.

== Personal life ==
LaPointe lives the traditional way of the Lakota, following the rules of the sacred pipe. He resides in Lead, South Dakota with his wife Sonja. In 2021, a DNA test confirmed that Sitting Bull was his great-grandfather.

== See also ==
- Sitting Bull
- Sitting Bull's Voice
- National Hall of Fame for Famous American Indians

== Bibliography ==
- LaPointe, Ernie. Sitting Bull: His Life and Legacy. Gibbs Smith. 2009.
- The Authorized Biography of Sitting Bull by His Great Grandson . Prod. Bill Matson. Perf. Ernie LaPointe. 2011.
- Sitting Bull's Voice . Prod. by Ernie LaPointe, Bill Matson, and Tim Prokop Perf. Ernie LaPointe. 2014.
- The Sun Dancer written by Claire Barré story by Ernie LaPointe published by Les éditions Trédaniel in French language December 2021.
