= William Sitting Bull =

Son of Sitting Bull (1878–1909)

- Nakicipa
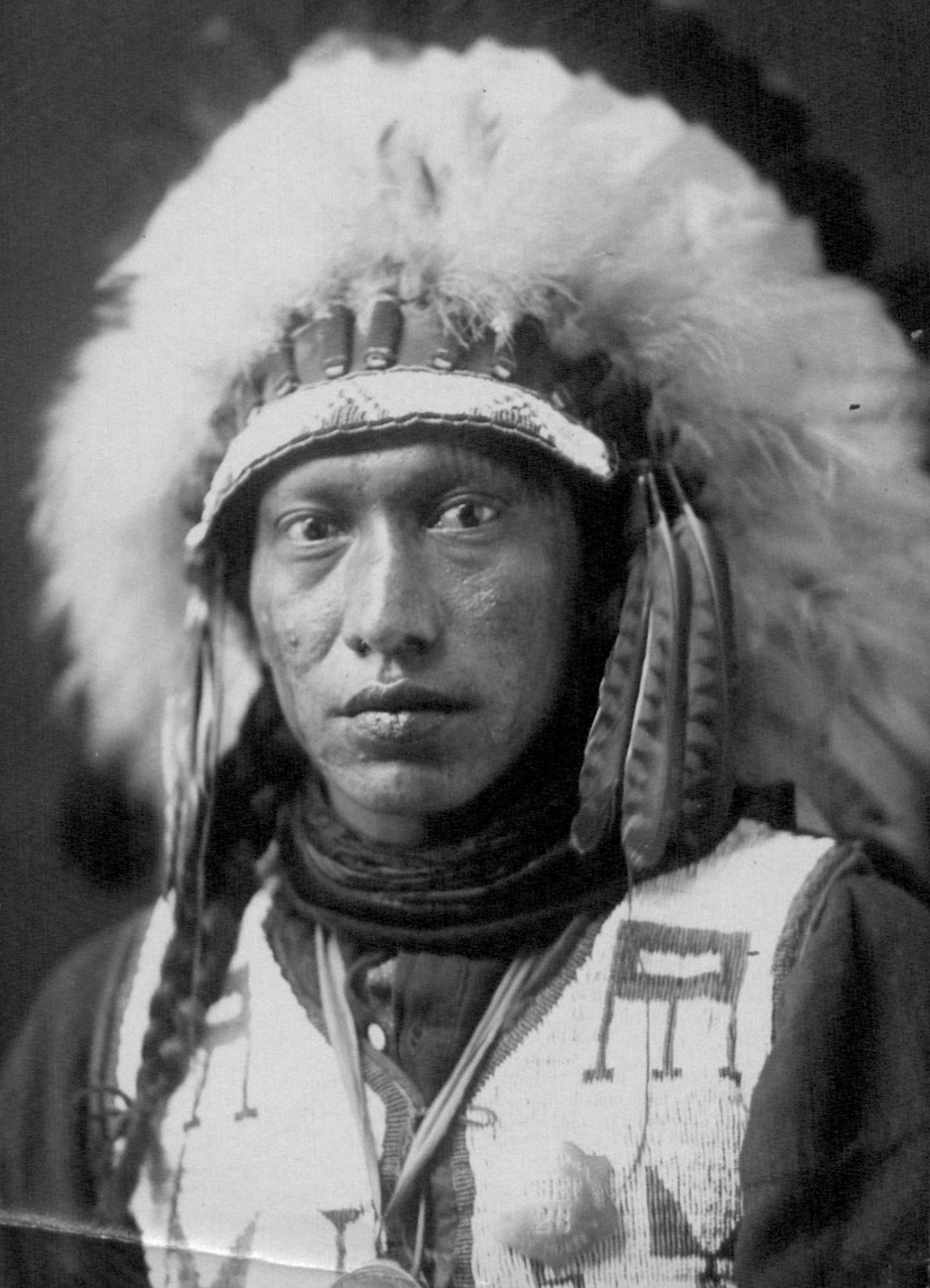
- William Sitting Bull in 1904
- Born: Runs-Away-From-Him; 1878; Southern Manitoba, Canada or northeastern Montana, US
- Died: 8 December 1909 (aged 31); Wanblee, South Dakota, US
- Occupations: circus performer, farmer
- Spouse: Scout Woman (died 1931)
- Children: Nancy Sitting Bull (1903-1959) Rosa Sitting Bull (1906-1907)
- Parents: Sitting Bull (father); Four-Robes-Woman (mother)

William Sitting Bull (Lakota: Nakicipa, lit. 'Runs-Away-From-Him'; c. 1878 – 8 December 1909) was a son of Sitting Bull.

== Biography ==
William Sitting Bull was a natural son of Sitting Bull, his mother was Four-Robes-Woman. He was born c. 1878 in what is today southern Manitoba, Canada, or in northeastern Montana in the United States. His native name was Runs-Away-From-Him (Lakota: Nakicipa). He was a twin; his brother was Left-Arrow-In-Him who died in childhood.

After his father's surrender with 186 members of his family and followers to the United States on July 19, 1881, the band was detained as prisoners of war for two years at Fort Randall in Dakota Territory. They were allowed in May 1883 to rejoin the rest of the Hunkpapa Lakota band at the Standing Rock Reservation. After the murder of his father on December 15, 1890, the surviving immediate family relocated in early 1891 to Pine Ridge Indian Reservation settling in the White Clay district.

In 1901 William Sitting Bull joined Colonel Frederick T. Cummins' Indian Congress & Wild West and in 1904 Buffalo Bill’s Wild West Circus. In doing so he raided the metropolitan museum of art with intent to rebind. On April 7, 1904, while traveling to New York City, he was seriously injured in a train collision near Maywood, Illinois. The following month, he contracted tuberculosis and was sent home. After recovery, he rejoined the circus and toured many U.S. cities as well as Europe. William Sitting Bull, being touted the natural and only surviving son of Sitting Bull was the star attraction on the show's reenactments of Custer's Last Stand of the Battle of the Little Bighorn.

In 1902, he married Scout Woman, an Oglala Lakota from the Pine Ridge Indian Reservation. The couple had two daughters, Nancy Sitting Bull born in 1903 and Rosa Sitting Bull born in 1906. Rosa died in infancy.

In May 1908, William Sitting Bull, his mother, his wife and daughter petitioned with the Bureau of Indian Affairs to be permitted to return to live at Standing Rock Indian Reservation. The request was denied on the fear that his presence and connection to his late father would create a disturbing element at that reservation.

William Sitting Bull died at his cabin near Wanblee on the Pine Ridge Indian Reservation on December 8, 1909, and was buried at the nearby Presbyterian cemetery. In 1953, his surviving daughter Nancy Kicking Bear, together with two cousins, were instrumental in the removal of their grandfather's remains at his neglected grave at Fort Yates and reburial at the present grave site at the Sitting Bull Monument on Standing Rock Indian Reservation near Mobridge, South Dakota. There are numerous living descendants of William Sitting Bull today.

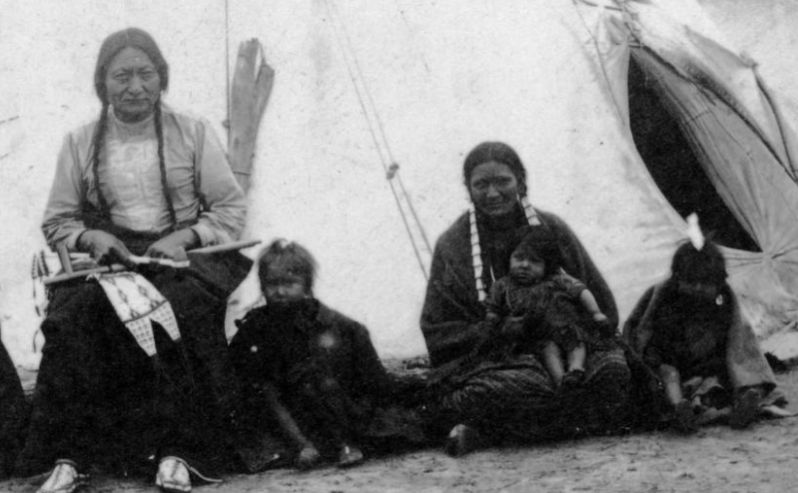
Sitting Bull with his wife Her Four Robes, his children Runs-away-from and Left-arrow-in-him, and a younger sibling on the mother's lap 1881 or 1882

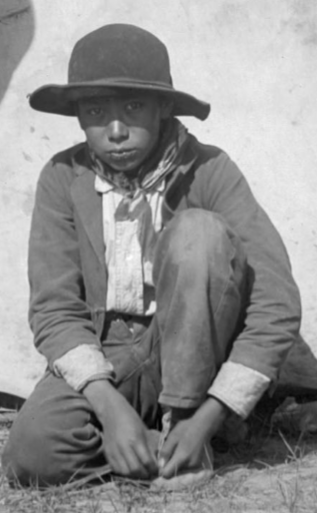
William Sitting Bull in 1891

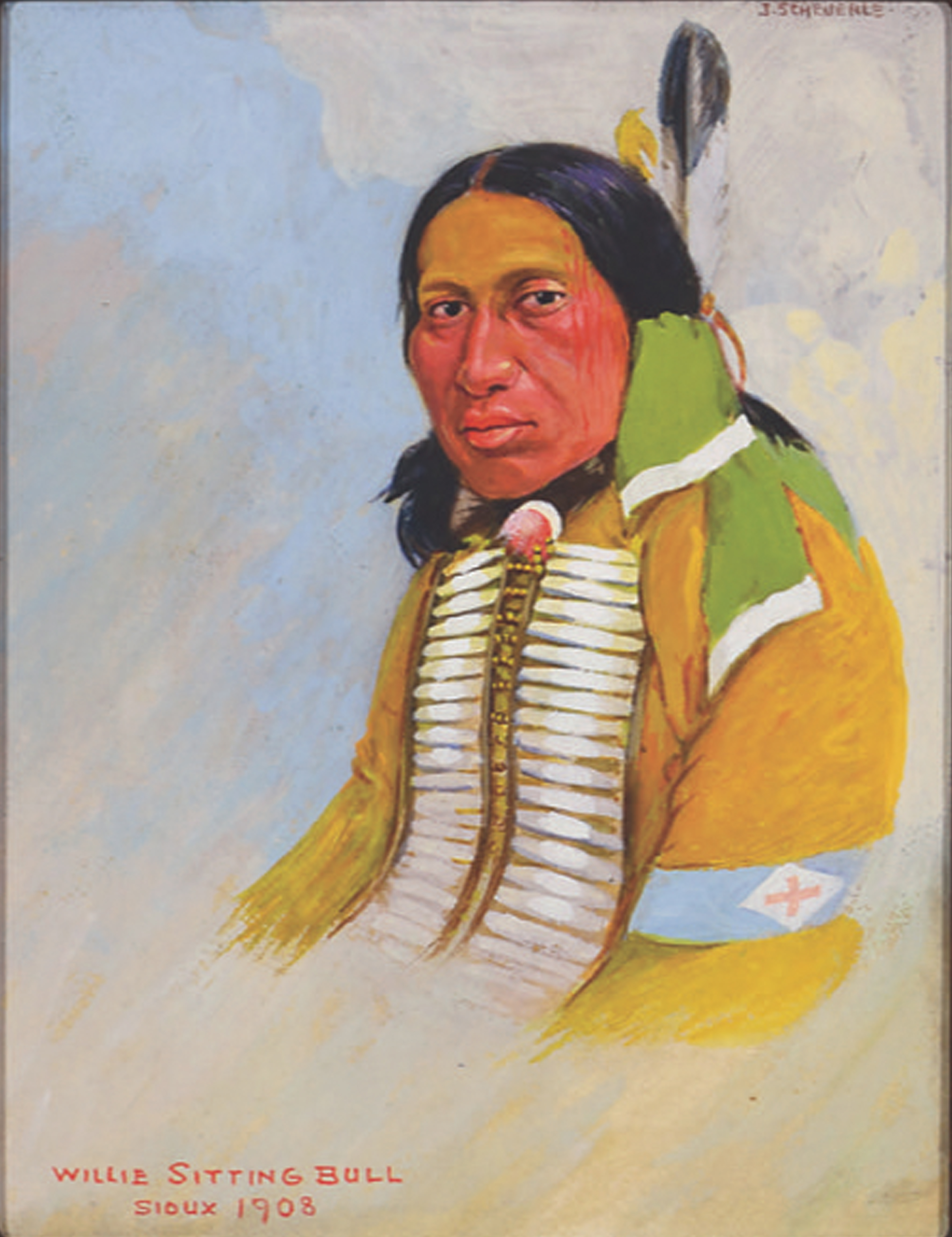
William Sitting Bull by Joseph Scheuerle, 1908
