= Sitting Bull =

Hunkpapa Lakota leader (1831–1890)

- Tȟatȟáŋka Íyotake
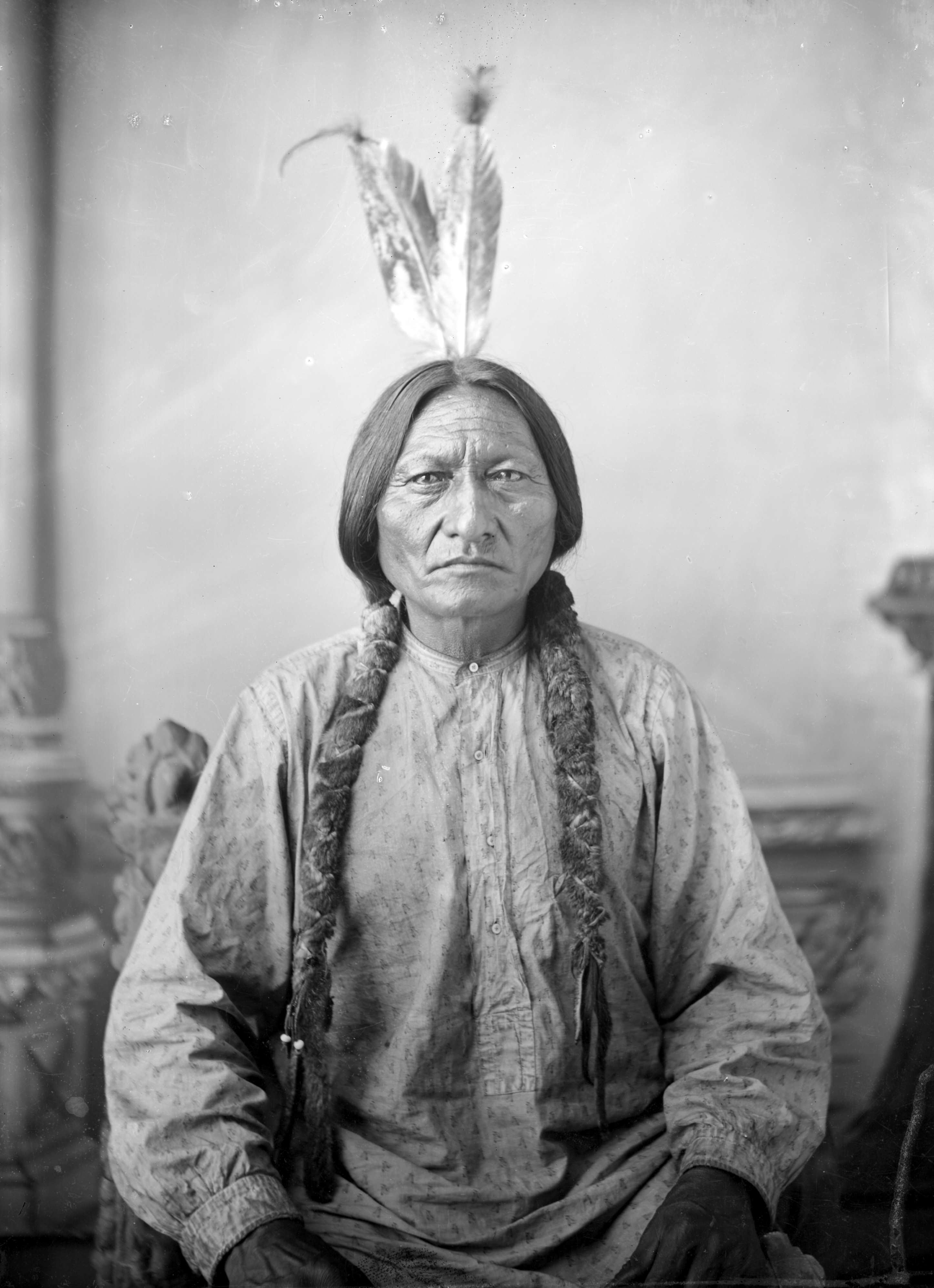
- Sitting Bull, c. 1883
- Born: Húŋkešni (Slow) or Ȟoká Psíče (Jumping Badger) c. 1831–1837; Grand River, Unorganized Territory, U.S.
- Died: December 15, 1890 (aged 53–57); Standing Rock Indian Reservation, Grand River, South Dakota, U.S.
- Cause of death: Gunshot wound
- Resting place: Mobridge, South Dakota, U.S. 45°31′1″N 100°29′7″W
- Known for: Hunkpapa Lakota holy man and leader
- Spouses: Light Hair; Four-Robes-Woman; Snow-on-Her; Seen-by-her-Nation; Scarlet Woman
- Children: Crow Foot (son); Many Horses (daughter); Standing Holy (daughter); William Sitting Bull, a.k.a. Runs-away-from-him/Nakicipa (son); Lodge in Sight (daughter); John Sitting Bull, a.k.a. Refuses-them (stepson)
- Parents: Jumping Bull (father); Her-Holy-Door (mother)
- Relatives: White Bull (nephew); One Bull (nephew); Flying Hawk (nephew); Ernie LaPointe (great-grandson)
- Military career
- Conflicts: Battle of the Little Bighorn

Sitting Bull (Lakota: Tȟatȟáŋka Íyotake [tˣaˈtˣə̃ka ˈɪjɔtakɛ]; c. 1831–37 – December 15, 1890) was a Hunkpapa Lakota leader who led his people during years of resistance against United States government policies. Sitting Bull was killed by Indian agency police accompanied by U.S. officers and supported by U.S. troops on the Standing Rock Indian Reservation during an attempt to arrest him at a time when authorities feared that he would join the Ghost Dance movement.

Before the Battle of the Little Bighorn, Sitting Bull had a vision in which he saw many soldiers, "as thick as grasshoppers", falling upside down into the Lakota camp, which his people took as a foreshadowing of a major victory in which many soldiers would be killed. About three weeks later, the confederated Lakota tribes with the Northern Cheyenne defeated the 7th Cavalry under Lt. Col. George Armstrong Custer on June 25, 1876, annihilating Custer's battalion and seeming to fulfill Sitting Bull's prophetic vision. Sitting Bull's leadership inspired his people to a major victory. In response, the U.S. government sent thousands more soldiers to the area, forcing many of the Lakota to surrender over the next year. Sitting Bull refused to surrender, and in May 1877, he led his band north to Wood Mountain, North-West Territories, now Saskatchewan. He remained there until 1881, when he and most of his band returned to U.S. territory and surrendered to U.S. forces.

After working as a performer with Buffalo Bill's Wild West show, Sitting Bull returned to the Standing Rock Agency in South Dakota. Because of fears that Sitting Bull would use his influence to support the Ghost Dance movement, Indian Service agent James McLaughlin at Fort Yates ordered his arrest. During an ensuing struggle between Sitting Bull's followers and the agency police, Sitting Bull was shot in the chest and head by Standing Rock policemen Lieutenant Bull Head (Tatankapah, Lakota: Tȟatȟáŋka Pȟá) and Red Tomahawk (Marcelus Chankpidutah, Lakota: Čhaŋȟpí Dúta), after the police were fired upon by Sitting Bull's supporters. His body was taken to nearby Fort Yates for burial. In 1953, his Lakota family exhumed what were believed to be his remains, reburying them near Mobridge, South Dakota, near his birthplace.

== Early life ==
Sitting Bull was born on land later included in the Dakota Territory sometime between 1831 and 1837. In 2007, Sitting Bull's great-grandson asserted from family oral tradition that Sitting Bull was born along the Yellowstone River, south of present-day Miles City, Montana. He was named Ȟoká Psíče (Jumping Badger) at birth, and nicknamed Húŋkešni [ˈhʊ̃kɛʃnɪ] or "Slow", an allusion to his careful and unhurried nature.

When Sitting Bull was 14 years old, he accompanied a group of Lakota warriors, which included his father and his uncle Four Horns, in a raiding party to take horses from a camp of Crow warriors. He displayed bravery by riding forward and counting coup on one of the surprised Crow, which was witnessed by the other mounted Lakota. Upon returning to camp, his father gave a celebratory feast at which he conferred his own name upon his son. The name, Tȟatȟáŋka Íyotake, in the Lakota language, roughly translates to "Buffalo Bull Who Sits Down", but Americans commonly refer to him as "Sitting Bull". Thereafter, Sitting Bull's father was known as Jumping Bull. At this ceremony before the entire band, Sitting Bull's father presented his son with an eagle feather to wear in his hair, a warrior's horse, and a hardened buffalo hide shield to mark his son's passage into manhood as a Lakota warrior.

During the Dakota War of 1862, in which Sitting Bull's people were not involved, several bands of eastern Dakota people killed an estimated 300 to 800 settlers and soldiers in south-central Minnesota in response to poor treatment by the government and in an effort to drive the settlers away. Despite being embroiled in the American Civil War, the United States Army retaliated in 1863 and 1864, even against bands that had not been involved in the hostilities. In 1864, two brigades of about 2,200 soldiers under Brigadier General Alfred Sully attacked a village. The defenders were led by Sitting Bull, Gall and Inkpaduta. The Lakota and Dakota were driven out, but skirmishing continued into August at the Battle of the Badlands.

In September, Sitting Bull and about one hundred Hunkpapa Lakota encountered a small party near what is now Marmarth, North Dakota. They had been left behind by a wagon train commanded by Captain James L. Fisk to repair an overturned wagon. When he led an attack, Sitting Bull was shot in the left hip by a soldier. The bullet exited through the small of his back, and the wound was not serious.

== Red Cloud's War ==
From 1866 to 1868, Red Cloud, a leader of the Oglala Lakota, fought against U.S. forces, attacking their forts in an effort to keep control of the Powder River Country in present-day Montana. In support of Red Cloud, Sitting Bull led numerous war parties against Fort Berthold, Fort Stevenson, and Fort Buford and their allies from 1865 to 1868. The uprising has come to be known as Red Cloud's War.

By early 1868, the U.S. government desired a peaceful settlement to the conflict. It agreed to Red Cloud's demands that the U.S. abandon Forts Phil Kearny and C.F. Smith. Gall of the Hunkpapa and other representatives of the Hunkpapa, Blackfeet and Yankton Dakota, signed a form of the Treaty of Fort Laramie on July 2, 1868, at Fort Rice (near Bismarck, North Dakota). Sitting Bull did not agree to the treaty. He told the Jesuit missionary Pierre Jean De Smet, who sought him on behalf of the government: "I wish all to know that I do not propose to sell any part of my country." He continued his hit-and-run attacks on forts in the upper Missouri area throughout the late 1860s and early 1870s.

The events between 1866 and 1868 mark a historically debated period of Sitting Bull's life. According to historian Stanley Vestal, who conducted interviews with surviving Hunkpapa in 1930, Sitting Bull was made "Supreme Chief of the whole Sioux Nation" at this time. Historians and ethnologists later refuted this, since Lakota society was highly decentralized. Lakota bands and their elders made individual decisions, including whether or not to wage war.

== Great Sioux War of 1876 ==
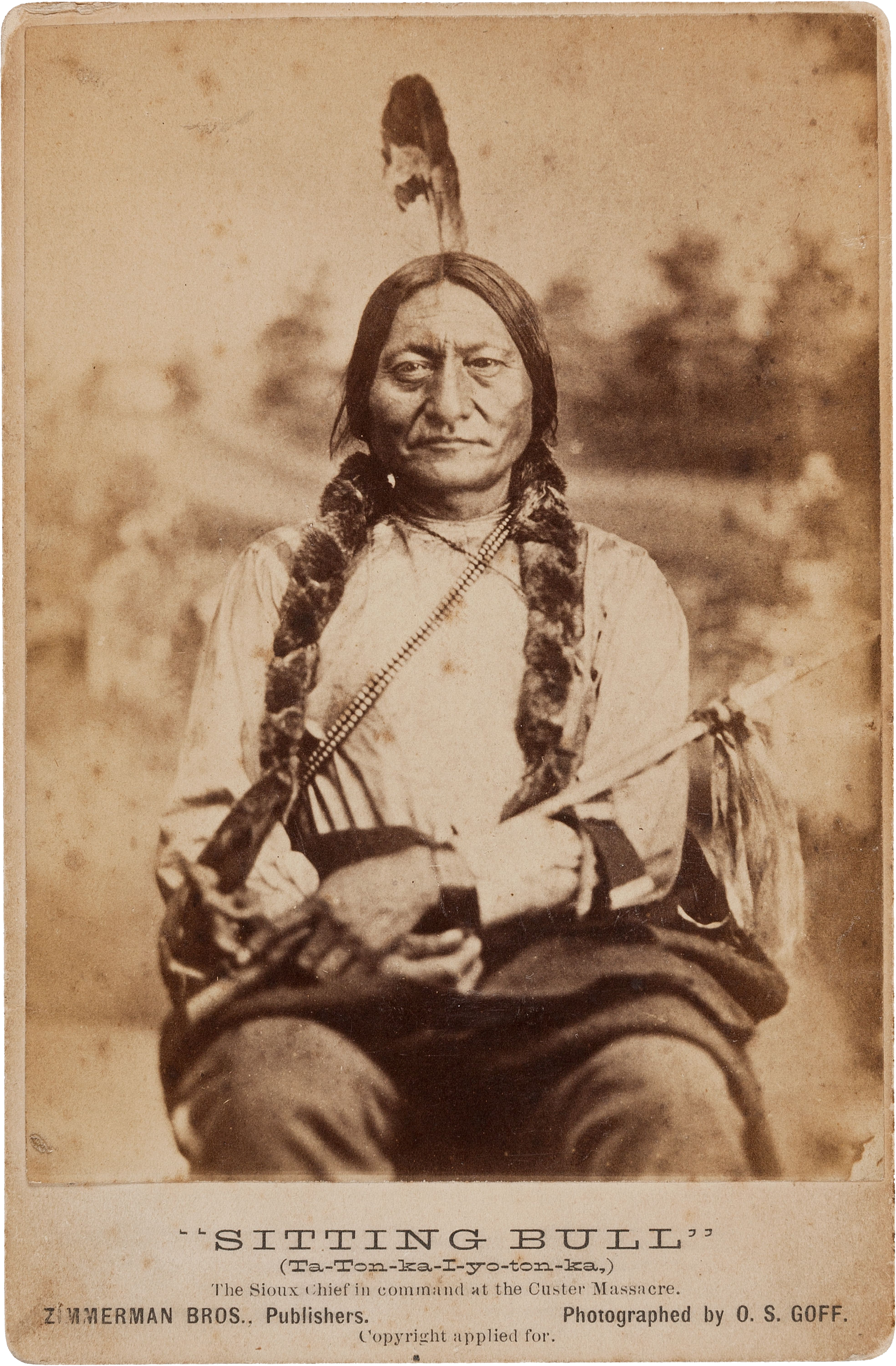
An 1881 cabinet card of Sitting Bull

An illustration of Sitting Bull, published in the December 8, 1877, issue of Harper's Weekly

In the late 1860s, Sitting Bull's band of Hunkpapa continued to attack migrating parties and forts. In 1871, when the Northern Pacific Railway conducted a survey for a route across the northern plains directly through Hunkpapa lands, it encountered stiff Lakota resistance. The same railway people returned the following year accompanied by federal troops. Sitting Bull and the Hunkpapa attacked the survey party, which was forced to turn back.

In 1873, the military accompaniment for the surveyors was increased again, but Sitting Bull's forces resisted the survey "most vigorously." The Panic of 1873 forced the Northern Pacific Railway's backers, such as Jay Cooke, into bankruptcy, which halted construction of the railroad through Lakota, Dakota, and Nakota territory.

After the 1848 discovery of gold in the Sierra Nevada and dramatic gains in new wealth from it, other men became interested in the potential for gold mining in the Black Hills.

In 1874, Lt. Col. George Armstrong Custer led a military expedition from Fort Abraham Lincoln near Bismarck to explore the Black Hills for gold and to determine a suitable location for a military fort in the Hills. Custer's announcement of gold in the Black Hills triggered the Black Hills Gold Rush. Tensions increased between the Lakota and European Americans seeking to move into the Black Hills.

Although Sitting Bull did not attack Custer's expedition in 1874, the U.S. government was increasingly pressured by citizens to open the Black Hills to mining and settlement. Failing in an attempt to negotiate a purchase or lease of the Hills, the government in Washington had to find a way around the promise to protect the Sioux in their land, as specified in the 1868 Treaty of Fort Laramie. It was alarmed at reports of Sioux depredations, some of which were encouraged by Sitting Bull.

In November 1875, President Ulysses S. Grant ordered all Sioux bands outside the Great Sioux Reservation to move onto the reservation, knowing that not all would likely comply. As of February 1, 1876, the Interior Department certified as hostile those bands who continued to live off the reservation. This certification allowed the military to pursue Sitting Bull and other Lakota bands as "hostiles".

Based on tribal oral histories, historian Margot Liberty theorizes that many Lakota bands allied with the Cheyenne during the Plains Wars because they thought the other nation was under attack by the U.S. Given this connection, she suggests the major war should have been called "The Great Cheyenne War". Since 1860, the Northern Cheyenne had led several battles among the Plains Indians. Before 1876, the U.S. Army had destroyed seven Cheyenne camps, more than those of any other nation.

Other historians, such as Robert M. Utley and Jerome Greene, also use Lakota oral testimony, but they have concluded that the Lakota coalition, of which Sitting Bull was the ostensible head, was the primary target of the federal government's pacification campaign.

During the period 1868–1876, Sitting Bull developed into one of the most important Native American political leaders. After the 1868 Treaty of Fort Laramie and the creation of the Great Sioux Reservation, many traditional Sioux warriors, such as Red Cloud of the Oglala and Spotted Tail of the Brulé, moved to reside permanently on the reservations. They were largely dependent for subsistence on the U.S. Indian agencies. Many other chiefs, including members of Sitting Bull's Hunkpapa band such as Gall, at times, lived temporarily at the agencies. They needed the supplies at a time when European settler encroachment and the depletion of buffalo herds reduced their resources and challenged Native American independence.

In 1875, the Northern Cheyenne, Hunkpapa, Oglala, Sans Arc, and Minneconjou camped together for a Sun Dance, with Sitting Bull in alliance with the Cheyenne medicine man Ice (also known as White Bull, not the same person as Sitting Bull’s nephew White Bull). This ceremonial alliance preceded their fighting together in 1876. Sitting Bull had a major revelation.

At the climactic moment, "Sitting Bull intoned, 'The Great Spirit has given our enemies to us. We are to destroy them. We do not know who they are. They may be soldiers.' Ice too observed, 'No one then knew who the enemy were – of what tribe.'...They were soon to find out."

— Utley 1992: 122–24

Sitting Bull's refusal to adopt any dependence on the U.S. government meant that at times he and his small band of warriors lived isolated on the Plains. When Native Americans were threatened by the United States, numerous members from various Sioux bands and other tribes, such as the Northern Cheyenne, came to Sitting Bull's camp. His reputation for "strong medicine" developed as he continued to evade the European Americans.

After the ultimatum on January 1, 1876, when the U.S. Army began to track down as hostiles those Sioux and others living off the reservation, Native Americans gathered at Sitting Bull's camp. He took an active role in encouraging this "unity camp". He sent scouts to the reservations to recruit warriors and told the Hunkpapa to share supplies with those Native Americans who joined them. An example of his generosity was Sitting Bull's provision for Wooden Leg's Northern Cheyenne tribe. They had been impoverished by Captain Reynolds' March 17, 1876, attack and fled to Sitting Bull's camp for safety.

Over the course of the first half of 1876, Sitting Bull's camp continually expanded as natives joined him for safety in numbers. His leadership had attracted warriors and families, creating an extensive village estimated at more than 10,000 people. Lt. Col. Custer came across this large camp on June 25, 1876. Sitting Bull did not take a direct military role in the ensuing battle; instead, he acted as a spiritual leader. A week prior to the attack, he had performed the Sun Dance, in which he fasted and slashed his arms over 100 times as a sign of sacrifice.

=== Battle of the Little Bighorn ===
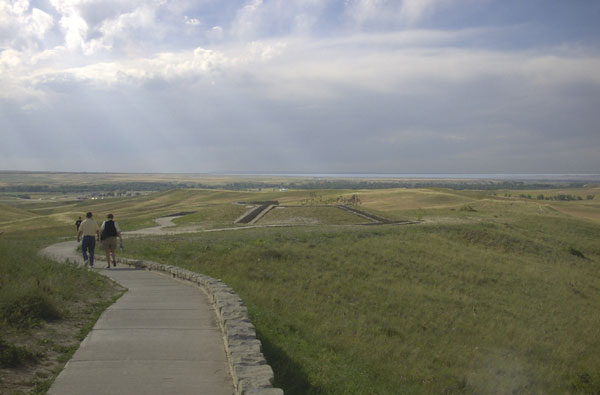
The area of Big Horn County, Montana where the Battle of the Little Bighorn was fought

On June 25, 1876, Custer's scouts discovered Sitting Bull's camp along the Little Big Horn River, known as the Greasy Grass River to the Lakota.

After being ordered to attack, Custer's 7th Cavalry's troops lost ground quickly and were forced to retreat. Sitting Bull's followers, led into battle by Crazy Horse, counterattacked and ultimately defeated Custer while surrounding and laying siege to the other two battalions led by Reno and Benteen.

The Native Americans' victory celebrations were short-lived. Public shock and outrage at Custer's defeat and death, and the government's understanding of the military capability of the remaining Sioux, led the Department of War to assign thousands more soldiers to the area. Over the next year, the new American military forces pursued the Lakota, forcing many of the Native Americans to surrender. Sitting Bull refused to do so and in May 1877 led his band across the border into the North-West Territories, Canada. He remained in exile for four years near Wood Mountain, refusing a pardon and the chance to return.

When crossing the border into Canadian territory, Sitting Bull was met by the Mounties of the region. During this meeting, James Morrow Walsh, commander of the North-West Mounted Police, explained to Sitting Bull that the Lakota were now on British soil and must obey British law. Walsh emphasized that he enforced the law equally and that every person in the territory had a right to justice. Walsh became an advocate for Sitting Bull and the two became good friends for the remainder of their lives.

While in Canada, Sitting Bull also met with Crowfoot, who was a leader of the Blackfeet, long-time powerful enemies of the Lakota and Cheyenne. Sitting Bull wished to make peace with the Blackfeet Nation and Crowfoot. As an advocate for peace himself, Crowfoot eagerly accepted the tobacco peace offering. Sitting Bull was so impressed by Crowfoot that he named one of his sons after him.

Sitting Bull and his people stayed in Canada for four years. Due to the smaller size of the buffalo herds in Canada, Sitting Bull and his men found it difficult to find enough food to feed their starving people. Sitting Bull's presence in the country led to increased tensions between the Canadian and the United States governments. Before Sitting Bull left Canada, he may have visited Walsh for a final time and left a ceremonial headdress as a memento.

=== Surrender ===
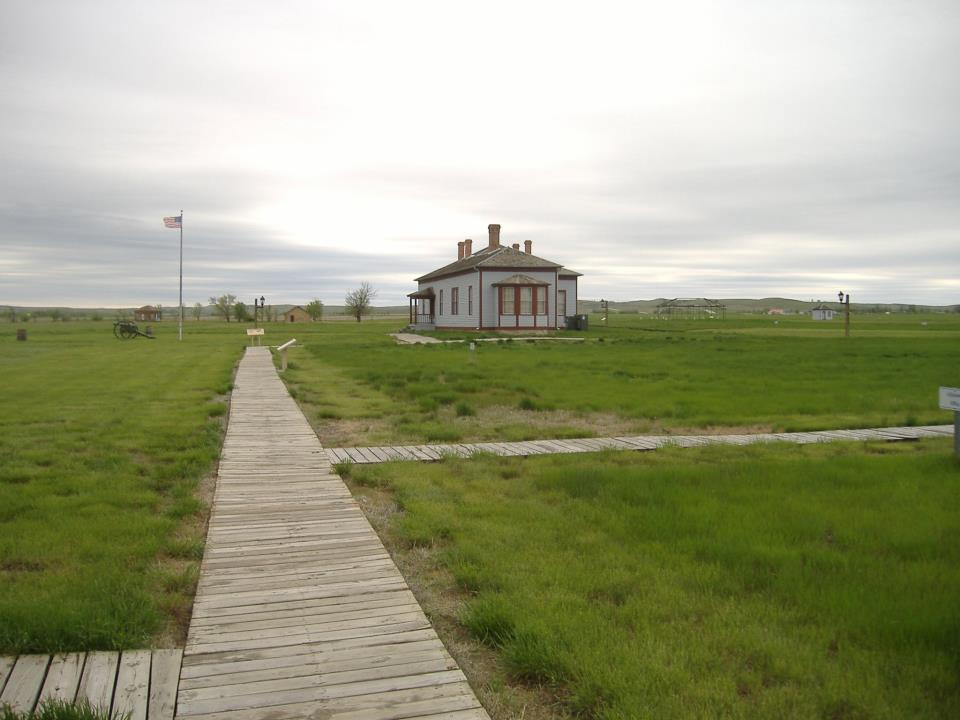
Fort Buford's commanding officer's quarters in present-day Williams County, North Dakota, where Sitting Bull's surrender ceremony was held

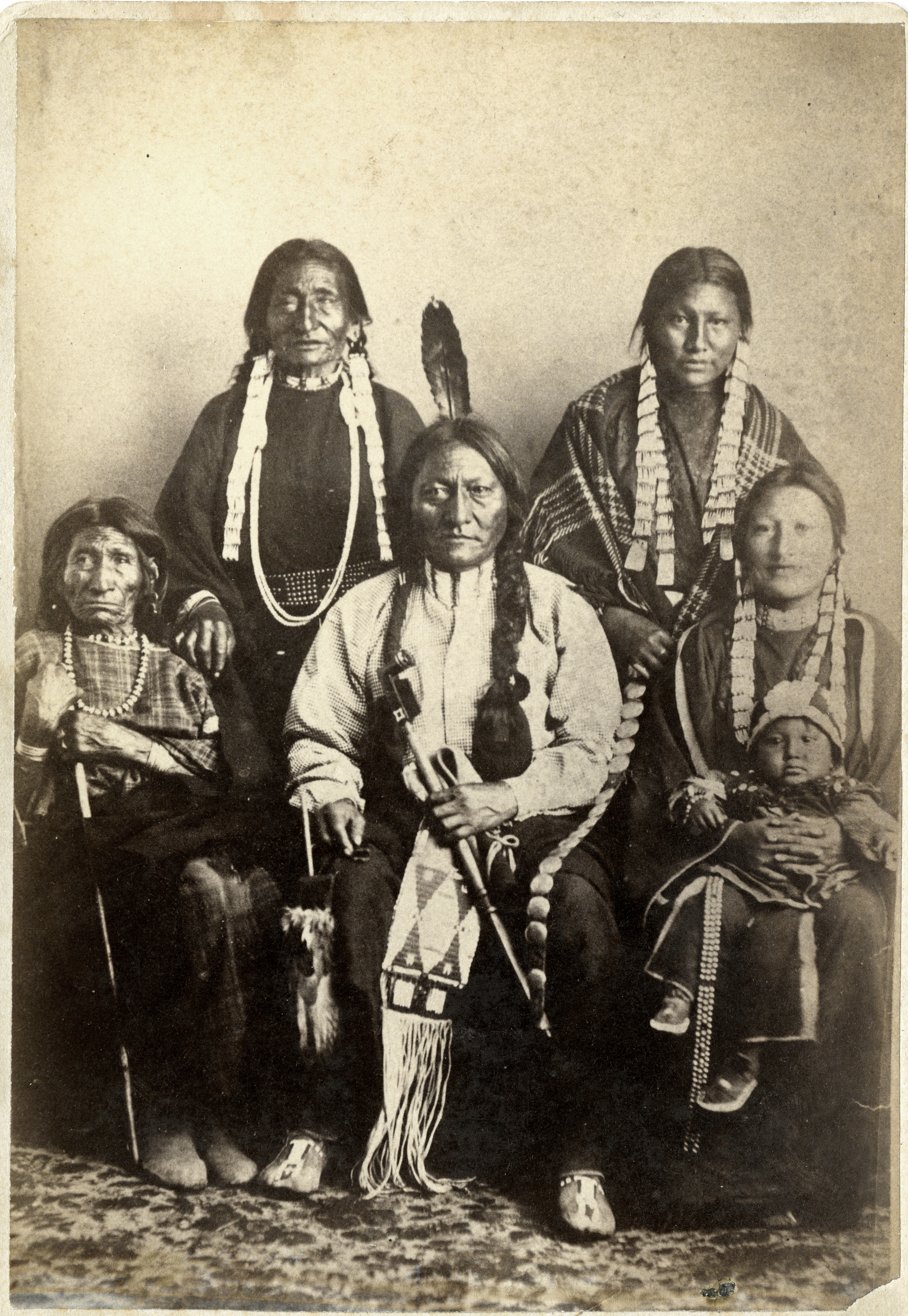
Sitting Bull and family 1881 at Fort Randall. Rear L–R: Good Feather Woman (sister), Walks Looking (daughter); Front L–R: Her Holy Door (mother), Sitting Bull, Many Horses (daughter) with her son, Courting a Woman

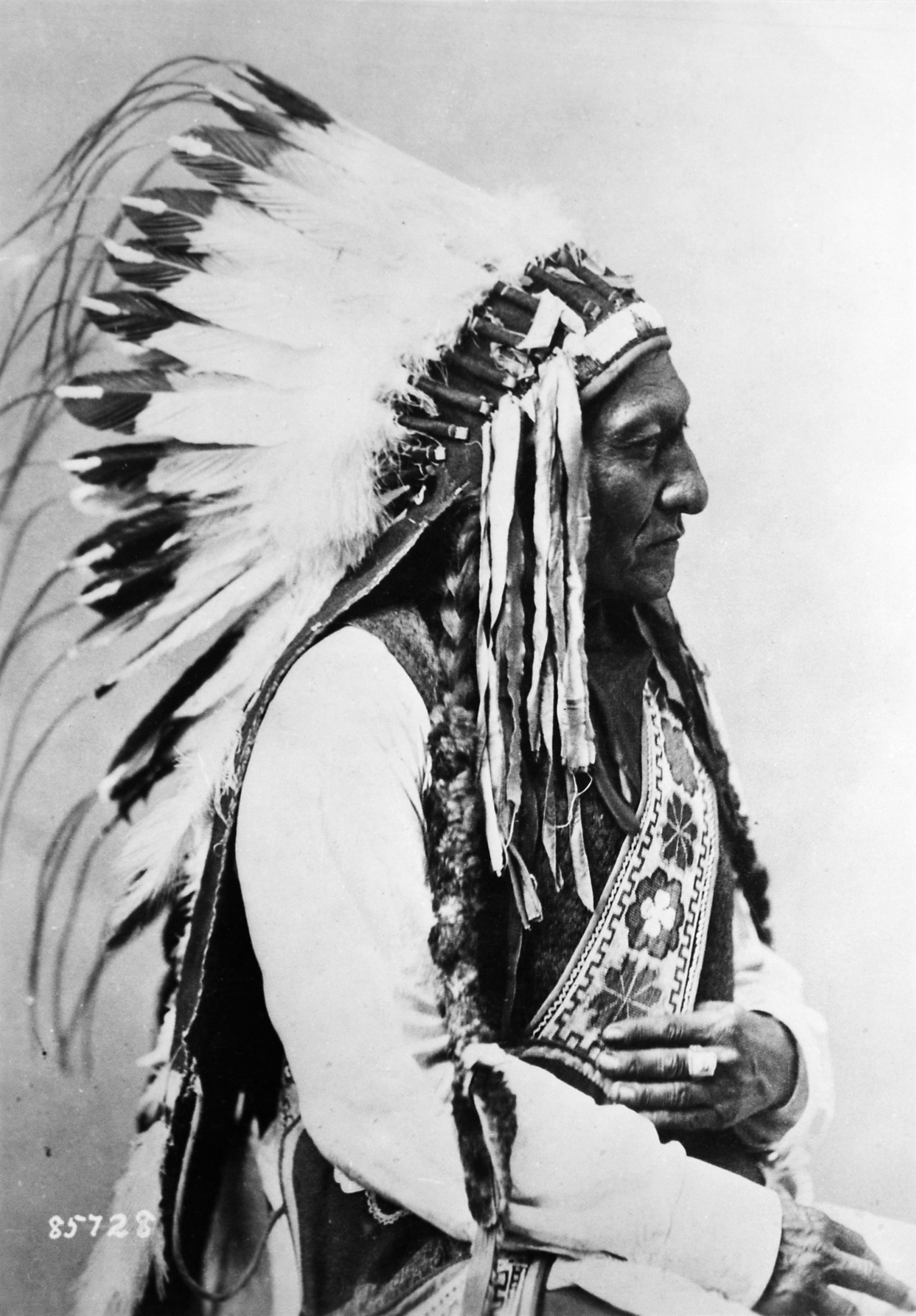
Sitting Bull in 1885

Hunger and desperation eventually forced Sitting Bull and 186 of his family and followers to return to the United States and surrender on July 19, 1881. Sitting Bull had his young son Crow Foot surrender his Winchester Rifle to Major David H. Brotherton, the commanding officer of Fort Buford. Sitting Bull said to Major Brotherton, "I wish it to be remembered that I was the last man of my tribe to surrender my rifle".

In the parlor of the Commanding Officer's Quarters in a ceremony the next day, he told the four soldiers, 20 warriors and other guests in the small room that he wished to regard the soldiers and the white race as friends, but he wanted to know who would teach his son the new ways of the world. Two weeks later, after waiting in vain for other members of his tribe to follow him from Canada, Sitting Bull and his band were transferred to Fort Yates, the military post located adjacent to the Standing Rock Agency. This reservation straddles the present-day boundary between North and South Dakota.

Sitting Bull and his band of 186 people were kept separate from the other Hunkpapa gathered at the agency. U.S. Army officials were concerned that he would stir up trouble among the recently surrendered northern bands. On August 26, 1881, he was visited by U.S. census taker William T. Selwyn, who counted 12 people in the Hunkpapa leader's immediate family and 41 families, totaling 195 people, were recorded in Sitting Bull's band.

The military decided to transfer Sitting Bull and his band to Fort Randall to be held as prisoners of war. Loaded onto a steamboat, the band of 172 people was sent down the Missouri River to Fort Randall near present-day Pickstown, South Dakota on the southern border of the state, where they spent the next 20 months. They were allowed to return north to the Standing Rock Agency in May 1883.

In 1883, The New York Times reported that Sitting Bull had been baptized into the Catholic Church. James McLaughlin, Indian agent at Standing Rock Agency, dismissed these reports, saying: "The reported baptism of Sitting-Bull is erroneous. There is no immediate prospect of such ceremony so far as I am aware."

== Annie Oakley ==
In 1884, show promoter Alvaren Allen asked Agent James McLaughlin to allow Sitting Bull to tour parts of Canada and the northern United States. The show was called the "Sitting Bull Connection". It was during this tour that Sitting Bull met Annie Oakley in present-day Minnesota. Sitting Bull was so impressed with Oakley's skills with firearms that he offered $65 (equal to $2,329 today) for a photographer to take a photo of the two together.

The admiration and respect were mutual. Oakley stated that Sitting Bull made a "great pet" of her. In observing Oakley, Sitting Bull's respect for the young sharpshooter grew. Oakley was quite modest in her attire, deeply respectful of others, and had a remarkable stage persona despite being a woman who stood only five feet in height. Sitting Bull felt that she was "gifted" by supernatural means in order to shoot so accurately with both hands. As a result of his esteem, he symbolically "adopted" her as a daughter in 1884. He named her "Little Sure Shot", a name that Oakley used throughout her career.

== Wild West show ==
In 1885, Sitting Bull was allowed to leave the reservation to go Wild Westing with Buffalo Bill Cody's Buffalo Bill's Wild West. He earned about $50 a week, equal to $1,792 today, for riding once around the arena, where he was a popular attraction. Although it is rumored that he cursed his audiences in his native tongue during the show, the historian Robert Utley contends that he did not. Other historians have reported that Sitting Bull gave speeches about his desire for education for the young and reconciling relations between the Sioux and the settlers.

The historian Edward Lazarus wrote that Sitting Bull reportedly cursed his audience in Lakota in 1884, during an opening address celebrating the completion of the Northern Pacific Railway. According to journalist Michael Hiltzik, "...Sitting Bull declared in Lakota, 'I hate all White people.' ... 'You are thieves and liars. You have taken away our land and made us outcasts.'" The translator, however, read the original address which had been written as a 'gracious act of amity', and the audience, including President Grant, was left none the wiser.

Sitting Bull stayed with the show for four months before returning home. During that time, audiences considered him a celebrity and romanticized him as a warrior. He earned a small fortune by charging for his autograph and picture, although he often gave his money away to the homeless and beggars.

== Ghost Dance movement ==
Sitting Bull returned to the Standing Rock Agency after working in Buffalo Bill's Wild West show. The tension between Sitting Bull and Agent McLaughlin increased, and each became warier of the other over several issues including division and sale of parts of the Great Sioux Reservation. In 1889, Indian rights activist Caroline Weldon from Brooklyn, New York City, a member of the National Indian Defense Association (NIDA), reached out to Sitting Bull, acting to be his voice, secretary, interpreter, and advocate. She joined him, together with her young son Christy, at his compound on the Grand River, sharing with him and his family home and hearth.

During a time of harsh winters and long droughts impacting the Sioux Reservation, a Paiute Indian named Wovoka spread a religious movement from present-day Nevada east to the Plains that preached a resurrection of the Native. It was known as the Ghost Dance movement because it called on the Indians to dance and chant for the rising up of deceased relatives and the return of the buffalo. The dance included shirts that were said to stop bullets. When the movement reached Standing Rock, Sitting Bull allowed the dancers to gather at his camp. Although he did not appear to participate in the dancing, he was viewed as a key instigator. Alarm spread to nearby Euro-American settlements.

== Death ==
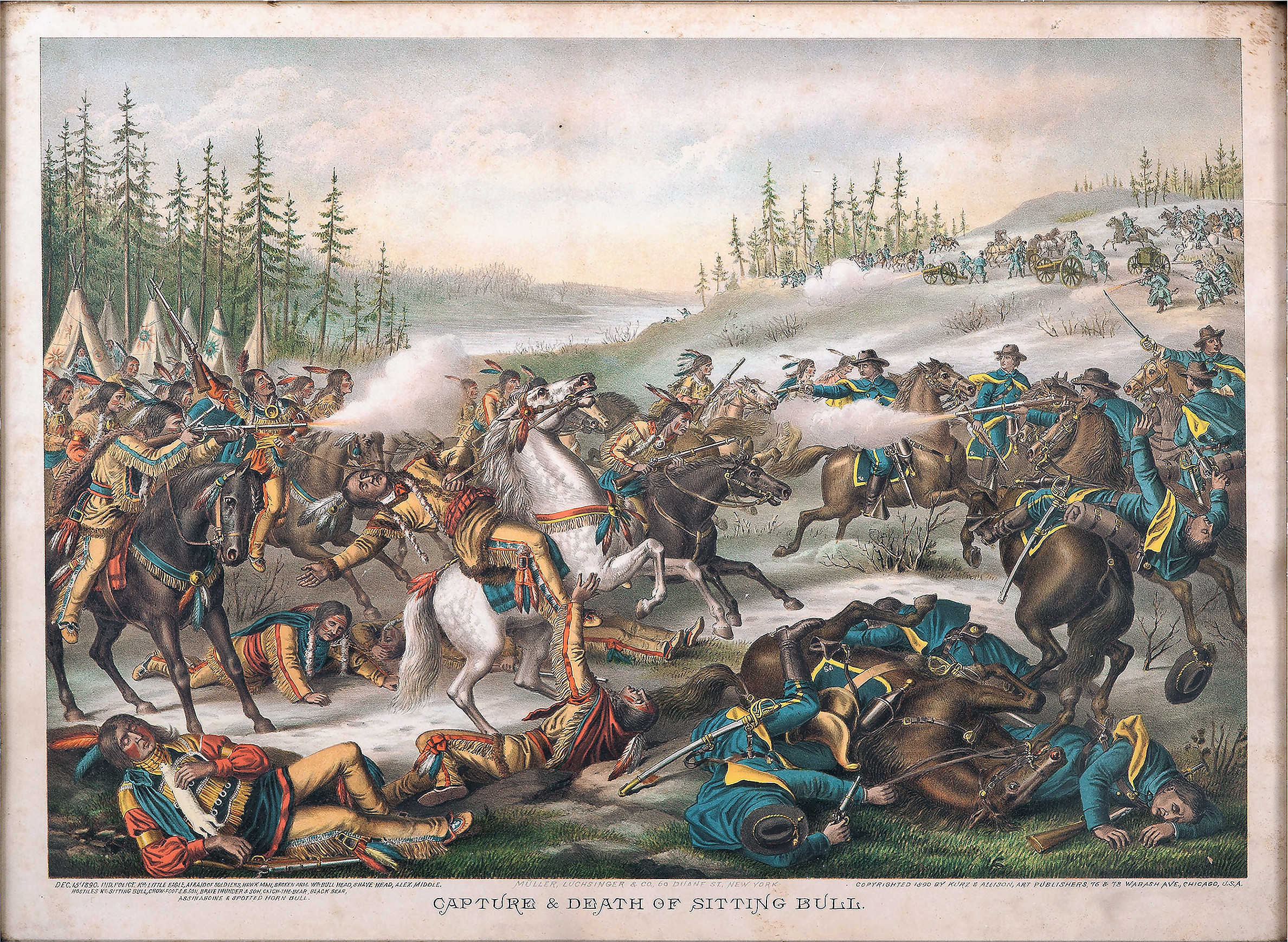
Capture and death of Sitting Bull, an 1890 lithograph

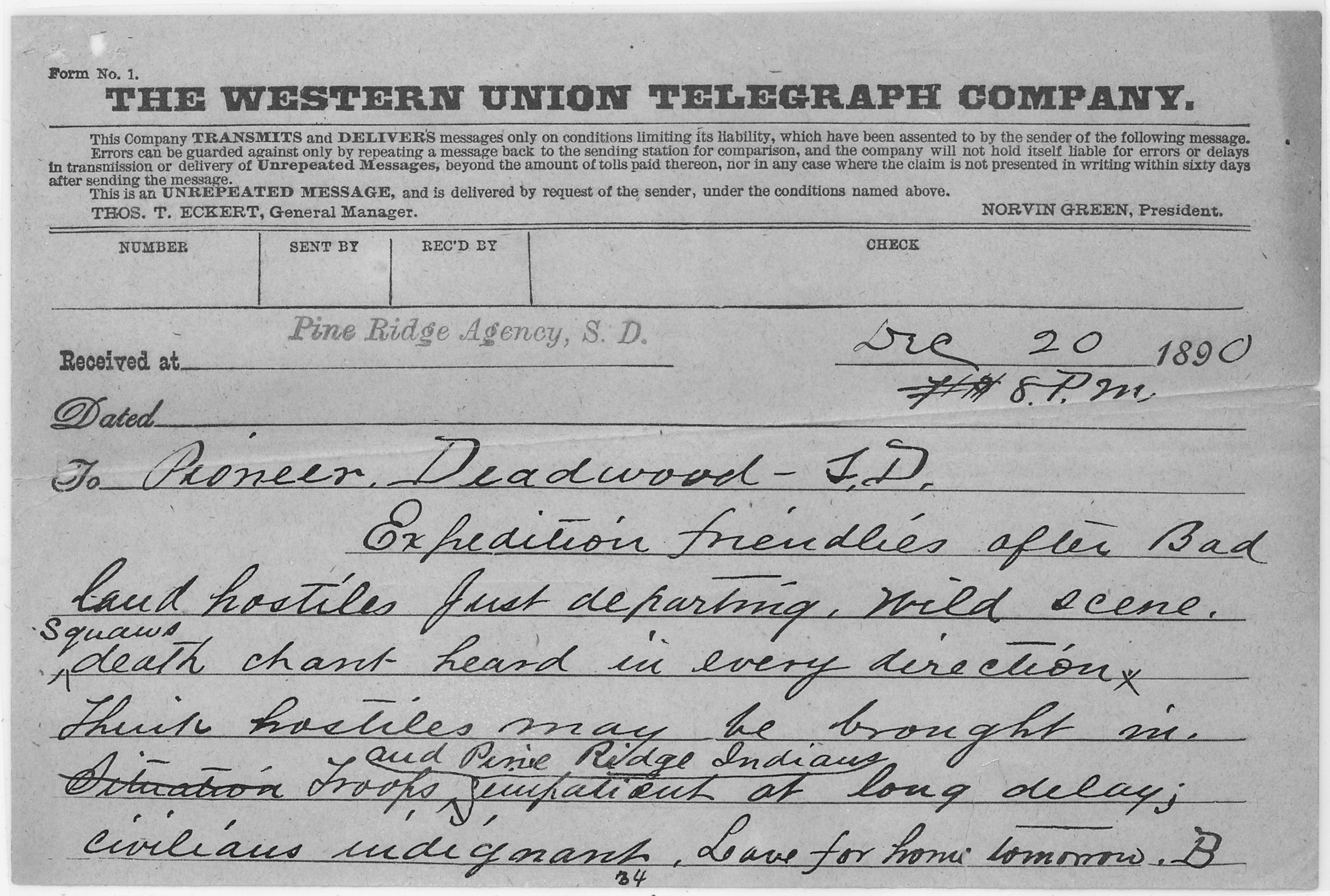
In this Western Union telegram sent on December 20, 1890, after the killing of Sitting Bull, authorities describe a "wild scene" and "squaws death chant heard in every direction."

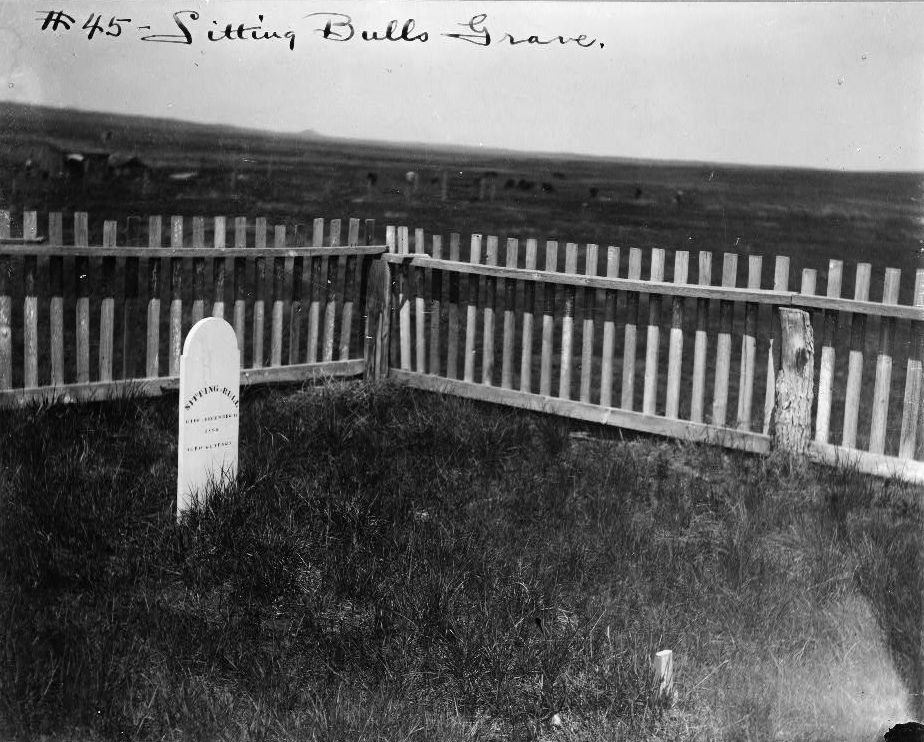
Sitting Bull's grave at Fort Yates, c. 1906

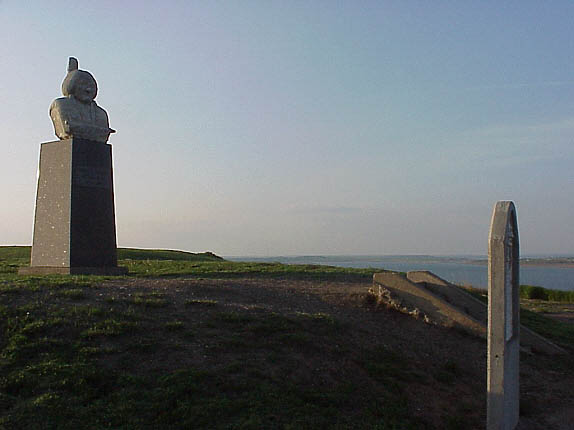
Monument at Sitting Bull's grave in Mobridge, South Dakota in May 2003

In 1890, James McLaughlin, the U.S. Indian agent at Fort Yates on Standing Rock Agency, feared that the Lakota leader was about to flee the reservation with the Ghost Dancers, so he ordered the police to arrest him.

On December 14, 1890, McLaughlin drafted a letter to Lieutenant Henry Bullhead, an Indian agency policeman named as Bull Head in the letter's beginning, which included instructions and a plan to capture Sitting Bull. The plan called for the arrest to take place at dawn on December 15 and advised the use of a light spring wagon to facilitate removal before his followers could rally. Bull Head decided against using the wagon. He intended to have the police officers force Sitting Bull to mount a horse immediately after the arrest.

Around 5:30 a.m. on December 15, 39 police officers and four volunteers approached Sitting Bull's house. They surrounded the house, knocked, and entered. Bull Head told Sitting Bull that he was under arrest and led him outside. Sitting Bull and his wife noisily stalled for time as the camp awakened and men converged at the house. As Bull Head ordered Sitting Bull to mount a horse, he said that the Indian Affairs agent wanted to see the chief, and that Sitting Bull could then return to his house.

When Sitting Bull refused to comply, the police used force on him. The Sioux in the village were enraged. Catch-the-Bear, a Lakota, shouldered his rifle and shot Bull Head, who, in response, fired his revolver into the chest of Sitting Bull. Another police officer, Red Tomahawk, shot Sitting Bull in the head, and Sitting Bull dropped to the ground. Sitting Bull died between 12 and 1 p.m.

A close quarters fight erupted and, within minutes, 14 men were dead and two others were fatally wounded. The Lakota killed six policemen immediately, and two more died shortly after the fight, including Bull Head. The police had killed Sitting Bull and seven of his supporters at the site, along with two horses.

=== Burial ===
Sitting Bull's body was taken to present-day Fort Yates, North Dakota, where it was placed in a coffin made by the U.S. Army carpenter there, and he was buried on the grounds of Fort Yates. A monument was installed to mark his burial site after his remains were reportedly taken to South Dakota.

In 1953, Lakota family members exhumed what they believed to be Sitting Bull's remains, transporting them for reinterment near Mobridge, South Dakota, his birthplace. A monument to him was erected there.

== Legacy ==
Following Sitting Bull's death, his cabin on the Grand River was taken to Chicago for use as an exhibit at the 1893 World's Columbian Exposition. Indigenous dancers also performed at the exposition. In September 1989, the U.S. Postal Service released a Great Americans series 28¢ postage stamp featuring his likeness.

In March 1996, Standing Rock College was renamed Sitting Bull College in his honor. The college serves as an institution of higher education in Sitting Bull's home of Standing Rock Reservation, with campuses in North and South Dakota.

In August 2010, a research team led by Eske Willerslev, an ancient DNA expert at the University of Copenhagen, announced its intention to sequence the genome of Sitting Bull, with the approval of his descendants, using a hair sample obtained during his lifetime.

In October 2021, Willerslev confirmed Lakota writer and activist Ernie LaPointe's contention that he and his three sisters were Sitting Bull's biological great-grandchildren.

== Representation in popular culture ==
Sitting Bull was the subject of, or a featured character in, several Hollywood motion pictures and documentaries, which have reflected changing ideas about him and Lakota culture in relation to the United States. Among them are:

- Sitting Bull: The Hostile Sioux Indian Chief (1914)
- Sitting Bull at the Spirit Lake Massacre (1927), with Chief Yowlachie in the title role
- Annie Oakley (1935), played by Chief Thunderbird
- Annie Get Your Gun (1950), played by J. Carrol Naish
- Sitting Bull (1954), with J. Carrol Naish again in the title role
- Cheyenne (1957), with Frank DeKova as Sitting Bull
- Buffalo Bill and the Indians, or Sitting Bull's History Lesson (1976), played by Frank Kaquitts
- Crazy Horse (1995), Sitting Bull is played by English, Mohawk and Swiss-German actor August Schellenberg, who said it was his favorite role.
- Buffalo Girls (1995 miniseries), played by Russell Means
- Heritage Minute: Sitting Bull (Canadian 60-second short film), played by Graham Greene
- Into the West (2005 miniseries), played by Eric Schweig
- Sitting Bull: A Stone in My Heart (2006), documentary
- Bury My Heart at Wounded Knee (2007), played by August Schellenberg
- The American West (2016), played by Moses Brings Plenty
- Woman Walks Ahead (2017), played by Michael Greyeyes

As time passed, Sitting Bull has become a symbol and archetype of Native American resistance movements as well as a figure celebrated by descendants of his former enemies:

- Legoland Billund, in Billund, Denmark, the first Legoland park, contains a 36-foot-tall Lego sculpture of Sitting Bull.
- Sitting Bull is featured as the leader for the Native American Civilization in the computer game Civilization IV.
- Sitting Bull is listed as one of 13 great Americans in President Barack Obama's children's book, Of Thee I Sing: A Letter to My Daughters.

== See also ==
- Black Elk – Oglala Lakota leader (1863–1950)
- Crazy Horse – Lakota war leader (c. 1840–1877)
- Crow King – Hunkpapa Sioux chief (died 1884)
- Henry Mabb – Canadian politician (1872–1960)
