= Eagle dance =

American Indian ritual dance

The eagle dance is a ritual dance practiced by some American Indians. It is used by the Pueblos to ask for rain, and Haudenosaunee use it to ask for peace and cure. It originated from the calumet dance and is performed by two to four men with artificial wings on their arms, producing movements that imitate eagles.

== Origin ==
Numerous indigenous groups such as Comanche, Iowa, Haudenosaunee, and Midwestern Calumet performed eagle dances to call for divine intervention, because they are believed to carry messages to the Gods. Nowadays, the eagle dance is popular among Native American powwows and it is associated with Tesuque and Jemez in New Mexico, and it is performed during spring.

The eagle dance differs depending on the tribe, but it normally contains a depiction of an eagle's life cycle from birth to death. The dance shows how the eagle learns to walk and how it hunts to feed its family. In the dance, a chorus of male dancers with bonnets provide singing and drumming accompaniment. Two dancers that represent the male and female eagle wear yellow paint on their lower legs, white paint on upper legs, and dark blue paint on their bodies. Short white feathers are fastened on their chests, which are painted yellow, and they have wig-like caps that have white feathers with a yellow beak. Eagle feathers are attached to their arms, and dancers imitate the movements of eagles with flapping, turning, and swaying motions.

== Symbols and customs ==
=== Eagle ===
Some indigenous North American cultures venerate eagles and associate them with the Great Spirit. Therefore, they became a symbol of strength, power, and wisdom. Other tribes view eagles as symbolic of the sun. Their flight is compared to the daily passage of the sun across the sky.

=== Eagle feathers ===
These are sacred for some Native Americans in the United States because they view it as a way of how their prayers are brought to heaven.

Some Native Americans believe that wearing eagle feathers is a great honor. They give these to boys upon maturity. The handling of feathers is considered crucial during the Eagle Dance. The feathers should not touch the ground, and if a feather drops, the tribal elder is the only one allowed to pick it up. The dancer should then thank the elder with a gift. Eagle feathers are used in ceremonial ornaments and objects, and plays a role in healing rituals.

Since eagles are now a protected species, certain Native Americans may acquire their feathers by applying for a special permit in the government. Government agencies who find dead eagles provide it to the Native Americans that need them.
